= New Hampshire's congressional delegations =

These are tables of congressional delegations from New Hampshire to the United States Senate and United States House of Representatives.

The current dean of the New Hampshire delegation is Senator Jeanne Shaheen, having served in the Senate since 2009.

== United States Senate ==
Current U.S. senators from New Hampshire
New Hampshire CPVI (2025): D+2	Class II senator	Class III senator
New Hampshire CPVI (2025): D+2	Jeanne Shaheen (Senior senator) (Madbury)	Maggie Hassan (Junior senator) (Newfields)
Party	Democratic	Democratic
Incumbent since	January 3, 2009	January 3, 2017

Class II senator	Congress	Class III senator
Paine Wingate (AA)	1st (1789–1791)	John Langdon (PA)
Paine Wingate (AA)	2nd (1791–1793)	John Langdon (PA)
Samuel Livermore (PA)	3rd (1793–1795)	John Langdon (AA)
Samuel Livermore (F)	4th (1795–1797)	John Langdon (DR)
Samuel Livermore (F)	5th (1797–1799)	John Langdon (DR)
Samuel Livermore (F)	6th (1799–1801)	John Langdon (DR)
Samuel Livermore (F)	7th (1801–1803)	James Sheafe (F)
Simeon Olcott (F)	7th (1801–1803)	William Plumer (F)
Simeon Olcott (F)	8th (1803–1805)	William Plumer (F)
Nicholas Gilman (DR)	9th (1805–1807)	William Plumer (F)
Nicholas Gilman (DR)	10th (1807–1809)	Nahum Parker (DR)
Nicholas Gilman (DR)	11th (1809–1811)	Nahum Parker (DR)
Nicholas Gilman (DR)	11th (1809–1811)	Charles Cutts (F)
Nicholas Gilman (DR)	12th (1811–1813)	Charles Cutts (F)
Nicholas Gilman (DR)	13th (1813–1815)	Charles Cutts (F)
Thomas W. Thompson (F)	13th (1813–1815)	Jeremiah Mason (F)
Thomas W. Thompson (F)	14th (1815–1817)	Jeremiah Mason (F)
David L. Morril (DR)	15th (1817–1819)	Jeremiah Mason (F)
David L. Morril (DR)	15th (1817–1819)	Clement Storer (DR)
David L. Morril (DR)	16th (1819–1821)	John F. Parrott (DR)
David L. Morril (DR)	17th (1821–1823)	John F. Parrott (DR)
Samuel Bell (DR)	18th (1823–1825)	John F. Parrott (DR)
Samuel Bell (NR)	19th (1825–1827)	Levi Woodbury (J)
Samuel Bell (NR)	20th (1827–1829)	Levi Woodbury (J)
Samuel Bell (NR)	21st (1829–1831)	Levi Woodbury (J)
Samuel Bell (NR)	22nd (1831–1833)	Isaac Hill (J)
Samuel Bell (NR)	23rd (1833–1835)	Isaac Hill (J)
Henry Hubbard (J)	24th (1835–1837)	Isaac Hill (J)
Henry Hubbard (J)	24th (1835–1837)	John Page (J)
Henry Hubbard (D)	25th (1837–1839)	Franklin Pierce (D)
Henry Hubbard (D)	26th (1839–1841)	Franklin Pierce (D)
Levi Woodbury (D)	27th (1841–1843)	Franklin Pierce (D)
Levi Woodbury (D)	27th (1841–1843)	Leonard Wilcox (D)
Levi Woodbury (D)	28th (1843–1845)	Charles G. Atherton (D)
Levi Woodbury (D)	29th (1845–1847)	Charles G. Atherton (D)
Benning W. Jenness (D)	29th (1845–1847)	Charles G. Atherton (D)
Joseph Cilley (Lty)	29th (1845–1847)	Charles G. Atherton (D)
John P. Hale (ID)	30th (1847–1849)	Charles G. Atherton (D)
John P. Hale (FS)	31st (1849–1851)	Moses Norris Jr. (D)
John P. Hale (FS)	32nd (1851–1853)	Moses Norris Jr. (D)
Charles G. Atherton (D)	33rd (1853–1855)	Moses Norris Jr. (D)
Jared W. Williams (D)	33rd (1853–1855)	John S. Wells (D)
John P. Hale (R)	34th (1855–1857)	James Bell (R)
John P. Hale (R)	35th (1857–1859)	James Bell (R)
John P. Hale (R)	35th (1857–1859)	Daniel Clark (R)
John P. Hale (R)	36th (1859–1861)	Daniel Clark (R)
John P. Hale (R)	37th (1861–1863)	Daniel Clark (R)
John P. Hale (R)	38th (1863–1865)	Daniel Clark (R)
Aaron H. Cragin (R)	39th (1865–1867)	Daniel Clark (R)
Aaron H. Cragin (R)	39th (1865–1867)	George G. Fogg (R)
Aaron H. Cragin (R)	40th (1867–1869)	James W. Patterson (R)
Aaron H. Cragin (R)	41st (1869–1871)	James W. Patterson (R)
Aaron H. Cragin (R)	42nd (1871–1873)	James W. Patterson (R)
Aaron H. Cragin (R)	43rd (1873–1875)	Bainbridge Wadleigh (R)
Aaron H. Cragin (R)	44th (1875–1877)	Bainbridge Wadleigh (R)
Edward H. Rollins (R)	45th (1877–1879)	Bainbridge Wadleigh (R)
Edward H. Rollins (R)	46th (1879–1881)	Charles H. Bell (R)
Edward H. Rollins (R)	46th (1879–1881)	Henry W. Blair (R)
Edward H. Rollins (R)	47th (1881–1883)	Henry W. Blair (R)
Austin F. Pike (R)	48th (1883–1885)	Henry W. Blair (R)
Austin F. Pike (R)	49th (1885–1887)	Henry W. Blair (R)
Person Colby Cheney (R)	49th (1885–1887)	Henry W. Blair (R)
Person Colby Cheney (R)	50th (1887–1889)	Henry W. Blair (R)
William E. Chandler (R)	50th (1887–1889)	Henry W. Blair (R)
Gilman Marston (R)	51st (1889–1891)	Henry W. Blair (R)
William E. Chandler (R)	51st (1889–1891)	Henry W. Blair (R)
William E. Chandler (R)	52nd (1891–1893)	Jacob H. Gallinger (R)
William E. Chandler (R)	53rd (1893–1895)	Jacob H. Gallinger (R)
William E. Chandler (R)	54th (1895–1897)	Jacob H. Gallinger (R)
William E. Chandler (R)	55th (1897–1899)	Jacob H. Gallinger (R)
William E. Chandler (R)	56th (1899–1901)	Jacob H. Gallinger (R)
Henry E. Burnham (R)	57th (1901–1903)	Jacob H. Gallinger (R)
Henry E. Burnham (R)	58th (1903–1905)	Jacob H. Gallinger (R)
Henry E. Burnham (R)	59th (1905–1907)	Jacob H. Gallinger (R)
Henry E. Burnham (R)	60th (1907–1909)	Jacob H. Gallinger (R)
Henry E. Burnham (R)	61st (1909–1911)	Jacob H. Gallinger (R)
Henry E. Burnham (R)	62nd (1911–1913)	Jacob H. Gallinger (R)
Henry F. Hollis (D)	63rd (1913–1915)	Jacob H. Gallinger (R)
Henry F. Hollis (D)	64th (1915–1917)	Jacob H. Gallinger (R)
Henry F. Hollis (D)	65th (1917–1919)	Jacob H. Gallinger (R)
Henry F. Hollis (D)	65th (1917–1919)	Irving W. Drew (R)
Henry F. Hollis (D)	65th (1917–1919)	George H. Moses (R)
Henry W. Keyes (R)	66th (1919–1921)	George H. Moses (R)
Henry W. Keyes (R)	67th (1921–1923)	George H. Moses (R)
Henry W. Keyes (R)	68th (1923–1925)	George H. Moses (R)
Henry W. Keyes (R)	69th (1925–1927)	George H. Moses (R)
Henry W. Keyes (R)	70th (1927–1929)	George H. Moses (R)
Henry W. Keyes (R)	71st (1929–1931)	George H. Moses (R)
Henry W. Keyes (R)	72nd (1931–1933)	George H. Moses (R)
Henry W. Keyes (R)	73rd (1933–1935)	Fred H. Brown (D)
Henry W. Keyes (R)	74th (1935–1937)	Fred H. Brown (D)
Styles Bridges (R)	75th (1937–1939)	Fred H. Brown (D)
Styles Bridges (R)	76th (1939–1941)	Charles W. Tobey (R)
Styles Bridges (R)	77th (1941–1943)	Charles W. Tobey (R)
Styles Bridges (R)	78th (1943–1945)	Charles W. Tobey (R)
Styles Bridges (R)	79th (1945–1947)	Charles W. Tobey (R)
Styles Bridges (R)	80th (1947–1949)	Charles W. Tobey (R)
Styles Bridges (R)	81st (1949–1951)	Charles W. Tobey (R)
Styles Bridges (R)	82nd (1951–1953)	Charles W. Tobey (R)
Styles Bridges (R)	83rd (1953–1955)	Charles W. Tobey (R)
Styles Bridges (R)	83rd (1953–1955)	Robert W. Upton (R)
Styles Bridges (R)	83rd (1953–1955)	Norris Cotton (R)
Styles Bridges (R)	84th (1955–1957)	Norris Cotton (R)
Styles Bridges (R)	85th (1957–1959)	Norris Cotton (R)
Styles Bridges (R)	86th (1959–1961)	Norris Cotton (R)
Styles Bridges (R)	87th (1961–1963)	Norris Cotton (R)
Maurice J. Murphy Jr. (R)	87th (1961–1963)	Norris Cotton (R)
Thomas J. McIntyre (D)	87th (1961–1963)	Norris Cotton (R)
Thomas J. McIntyre (D)	88th (1963–1965)	Norris Cotton (R)
Thomas J. McIntyre (D)	89th (1965–1967)	Norris Cotton (R)
Thomas J. McIntyre (D)	90th (1967–1969)	Norris Cotton (R)
Thomas J. McIntyre (D)	91st (1969–1971)	Norris Cotton (R)
Thomas J. McIntyre (D)	92nd (1971–1973)	Norris Cotton (R)
Thomas J. McIntyre (D)	93rd (1973–1975)	Norris Cotton (R)
Thomas J. McIntyre (D)	93rd (1973–1975)	Louis C. Wyman (R)
Thomas J. McIntyre (D)	94th (1975–1977)	Norris Cotton (R)
Thomas J. McIntyre (D)	94th (1975–1977)	John A. Durkin (D)
Thomas J. McIntyre (D)	95th (1977–1979)	John A. Durkin (D)
Gordon J. Humphrey (R)	96th (1979–1981)	John A. Durkin (D)
Gordon J. Humphrey (R)	96th (1979–1981)	Warren Rudman (R)
Gordon J. Humphrey (R)	97th (1981–1983)	Warren Rudman (R)
Gordon J. Humphrey (R)	98th (1983–1985)	Warren Rudman (R)
Gordon J. Humphrey (R)	99th (1985–1987)	Warren Rudman (R)
Gordon J. Humphrey (R)	100th (1987–1989)	Warren Rudman (R)
Gordon J. Humphrey (R)	101st (1989–1991)	Warren Rudman (R)
Bob Smith (R)	101st (1989–1991)	Warren Rudman (R)
Bob Smith (R)	102nd (1991–1993)	Warren Rudman (R)
Bob Smith (R)	103rd (1993–1995)	Judd Gregg (R)
Bob Smith (R)	104th (1995–1997)	Judd Gregg (R)
Bob Smith (R)	105th (1997–1999)	Judd Gregg (R)
Bob Smith (R)	106th (1999–2001)	Judd Gregg (R)
Bob Smith (R)	107th (2001–2003)	Judd Gregg (R)
John E. Sununu (R)	108th (2003–2005)	Judd Gregg (R)
John E. Sununu (R)	109th (2005–2007)	Judd Gregg (R)
John E. Sununu (R)	110th (2007–2009)	Judd Gregg (R)
Jeanne Shaheen (D)	111th (2009–2011)	Judd Gregg (R)
Jeanne Shaheen (D)	112th (2011–2013)	Kelly Ayotte (R)
Jeanne Shaheen (D)	113th (2013–2015)	Kelly Ayotte (R)
Jeanne Shaheen (D)	114th (2015–2017)	Kelly Ayotte (R)
Jeanne Shaheen (D)	115th (2017–2019)	Maggie Hassan (D)
Jeanne Shaheen (D)	116th (2019–2021)	Maggie Hassan (D)
Jeanne Shaheen (D)	117th (2021–2023)	Maggie Hassan (D)
Jeanne Shaheen (D)	118th (2023–2025)	Maggie Hassan (D)
Jeanne Shaheen (D)	119th (2025–2027)	Maggie Hassan (D)
Chris Pappas (D)	120th (2027–2029)	Maggie Hassan (D)

== United States House of Representatives ==
=== Current representatives ===
Current U.S. representatives from New Hampshire
District	Member (residence)	Party	Incumbent since	CPVI (2025)	District map
1st	Chris Pappas (Manchester)	Democratic	January 3, 2019	D+2	
2nd	Maggie Goodlander (Nashua)	Democratic	January 3, 2025	D+2	

=== 1789–1793: three at-large seats ===
Congress	At-large seat A	At-large seat B	At-large seat C
1st (1789–1791)	Abiel Foster (PA)	Nicholas Gilman (PA)	Samuel Livermore (AA)
2nd (1791–1793)	Jeremiah Smith (PA)	Nicholas Gilman (PA)	Samuel Livermore (PA)

=== 1793–1803: four at-large seats ===
Congress	At-large seat A	At-large seat B	At-large seat C	At-large seat D
3rd (1793–1795)	Jeremiah Smith (PA)	Nicholas Gilman (PA)	John S. Sherburne (AA)	Paine Wingate (PA)
4th (1795–1797)	Jeremiah Smith (F)	Nicholas Gilman (F)	John S. Sherburne (DR)	Abiel Foster (F)
5th (1797–1799)	Jeremiah Smith (F)	Jonathan Freeman (F)	William Gordon (F)	Abiel Foster (F)
5th (1797–1799)	Peleg Sprague (F)	Jonathan Freeman (F)	William Gordon (F)	Abiel Foster (F)
6th (1799–1801)	James Sheafe (F)	Jonathan Freeman (F)	William Gordon (F)	Abiel Foster (F)
6th (1799–1801)	James Sheafe (F)	Jonathan Freeman (F)	Samuel Tenney (F)	Abiel Foster (F)
7th (1801–1803)	George B. Upham (F)	Joseph Peirce (F)	Samuel Tenney (F)	Abiel Foster (F)
7th (1801–1803)	George B. Upham (F)	Samuel Hunt (F)	Samuel Tenney (F)	Abiel Foster (F)

=== 1803–1813: five at-large seats ===
Congress	At-large seat A	At-large seat B	At-large seat C	At-large seat D	At-large seat E
8th (1803–1805)	Silas Betton (F)	Samuel Hunt (F)	Samuel Tenney (F)	David Hough (F)	Clifton Clagett (F)
9th (1805–1807)	Silas Betton (F)	Thomas W. Thompson (F)	Samuel Tenney (F)	David Hough (F)	Caleb Ellis (F)
10th (1807–1809)	Peter Carleton (DR)	Daniel M. Durell (DR)	Francis Gardner (DR)	Jedediah K. Smith (DR)	Clement Storer (DR)
11th (1809–1811)	Daniel Blaisdell (F)	John Curtis; Chamberlain (F)	William Hale (F)	Nathaniel Appleton; Haven (F)	James Wilson (F)
12th (1811–1813)	Josiah Bartlett Jr. (DR)	Samuel Dinsmoor (DR)	Obed Hall (DR)	John Adams Harper (DR)	George Sullivan (F)

=== 1813–1833: six at-large seats ===
Congress	At-large seat A	At-large seat B	At-large seat C	At-large seat D	At-large seat E	At-large seat F
13th (1813–1815)	Bradbury Cilley (F)	Samuel Smith (F)	William Hale (F)	Roger Vose (F)	Daniel Webster (F)	Jeduthun Wilcox (F)
14th (1815–1817)	Bradbury Cilley (F)	Charles Humphrey; Atherton (F)	William Hale (F)	Roger Vose (F)	Daniel Webster (F)	Jeduthun Wilcox (F)
15th (1817–1819)	Josiah Butler (DR)	Nathaniel; Upham (DR)	Clifton Clagett (DR)	Salma Hale (DR)	Arthur; Livermore (DR)	John F. Parrott (DR)
16th (1819–1821)	Josiah Butler (DR)	Nathaniel; Upham (DR)	Clifton Clagett (DR)	Joseph Buffum Jr. (DR)	Arthur; Livermore (DR)	William; Plumer Jr. (DR) (Note: Supported the Adams-Clay ticket in the 1824 United States presidential election.)
17th (1821–1823)	Josiah Butler (DR)	Nathaniel; Upham (DR)	Matthew; Harvey (DR)	Aaron Matson (DR)	Thomas; Whipple Jr. (DR)	William; Plumer Jr. (DR)
18th (1823–1825)	Ichabod; Bartlett (DR)	Arthur; Livermore (DR)	Matthew; Harvey (DR)	Aaron Matson (DR)	Thomas; Whipple Jr. (DR)	William; Plumer Jr. (DR)
19th (1825–1827)	Ichabod; Bartlett (NR)	Titus Brown (NR)	Jonathan Harvey (J)	Joseph Healy (NR)	Thomas; Whipple Jr. (NR)	Nehemiah; Eastman (NR)
20th (1827–1829)	Ichabod; Bartlett (NR)	Titus Brown (NR)	Jonathan Harvey (J)	Joseph Healy (NR)	Thomas; Whipple Jr. (NR)	David Barker Jr. (NR)
21st (1829–1831)	John Brodhead (J)	Thomas Chandler (J)	Jonathan Harvey (J)	Joseph Hammons (J)	Henry Hubbard (J)	John W. Weeks (J)
22nd (1831–1833)	John Brodhead (J)	Thomas Chandler (J)	Joseph M. Harper (J)	Joseph Hammons (J)	Henry Hubbard (J)	John W. Weeks (J)

=== 1833–1843: five at-large seats ===
Congress	At-large seat A	At-large seat B	At-large seat C	At-large seat D	At-large seat E
23rd (1833–1835)	Benning M. Bean (J)	Robert Burns (J)	Franklin Pierce (J)	Joseph M. Harper (J)	Henry Hubbard (J)
24th (1835–1837)	Benning M. Bean (J)	Robert Burns (J)	Franklin Pierce (J)	Samuel Cushman (J)	Joseph Weeks (J)
25th (1837–1839)	Charles G. Atherton (D)	James Farrington (D)	Jared W. Williams (D)	Samuel Cushman (D)	Joseph Weeks (D)
26th (1839–1841)	Charles G. Atherton (D)	Edmund Burke (D)	Jared W. Williams (D)	Ira Allen Eastman (D)	Tristram Shaw (D)
27th (1841–1843)	Charles G. Atherton (D)	Edmund Burke (D)	John R. Reding (D)	Ira Allen Eastman (D)	Tristram Shaw (D)

=== 1843–1847: four seats ===
From 1843, four seats were allocated at-large. Starting in 1847, however, these seats were represented in districts.

Congress	At-large seat A	At-large seat B	At-large seat C	At-large seat D
28th (1843–1845)	Moses Norris Jr. (D)	Edmund Burke (D)	John R. Reding (D)	John P. Hale (D)
29th (1845–1847)	Moses Norris Jr. (D)	Mace Moulton (D)	James Hutchins; Johnson (D)	vacant
Congress	1st district	2nd district	3rd district	4th district
30th (1847–1849)	Amos Tuck (I)	Charles H. Peaslee (D)	James Hutchins; Johnson (D)	James Wilson II (W)
31st (1849–1851)	Amos Tuck (FS)	Charles H. Peaslee (D)	Harry Hibbard (D)	James Wilson II (W)
31st (1849–1851)	Amos Tuck (FS)	Charles H. Peaslee (D)	Harry Hibbard (D)	George W. Morrison (D)
32nd (1851–1853)	Amos Tuck (W)	Charles H. Peaslee (D)	Harry Hibbard (D)	Jared Perkins (W)

=== 1853–1883: three districts ===
Congress	1st district	2nd district	3rd district
33rd (1853–1855)	George W. Kittredge (D)	George W. Morrison (D)	Harry Hibbard (D)
34th (1855–1857)	James Pike (KN)	Mason Tappan (KN)	Aaron H. Cragin (KN)
35th (1857–1859)	James Pike (R)	Mason Tappan (R)	Aaron H. Cragin (R)
36th (1859–1861)	Gilman Marston (R)	Mason Tappan (R)	Thomas M. Edwards (R)
37th (1861–1863)	Gilman Marston (R)	Edward H. Rollins (R)	Thomas M. Edwards (R)
38th (1863–1865)	Daniel Marcy (D)	Edward H. Rollins (R)	James W. Patterson (R)
39th (1865–1867)	Gilman Marston (R)	Edward H. Rollins (R)	James W. Patterson (R)
40th (1867–1869)	Jacob Hart Ela (R)	Aaron Fletcher; Stevens (R)	Jacob Benton (R)
41st (1869–1871)	Jacob Hart Ela (R)	Aaron Fletcher; Stevens (R)	Jacob Benton (R)
42nd (1871–1873)	Ellery Albee Hibbard (D)	Samuel Newell Bell (D)	Hosea W. Parker (D)
43rd (1873–1875)	William B. Small (R)	Austin F. Pike (R)	Hosea W. Parker (D)
44th (1875–1877)	Frank Jones (D)	Samuel Newell Bell (D)	Henry W. Blair (R)
45th (1877–1879)	Frank Jones (D)	James F. Briggs (R)	Henry W. Blair (R)
46th (1879–1881)	Joshua G. Hall (R)	James F. Briggs (R)	Evarts Worcester Farr (R)
46th (1879–1881)	Joshua G. Hall (R)	James F. Briggs (R)	Ossian Ray (R)
47th (1881–1883)	Joshua G. Hall (R)	James F. Briggs (R)	Ossian Ray (R)

=== 1883–present: two districts ===
Congress	1st district	2nd district
48th (1883–1885)	Martin A. Haynes (R)	Ossian Ray (R)
49th (1885–1887)	Martin A. Haynes (R)	Jacob H. Gallinger (R)
50th (1887–1889)	Luther F. McKinney (D)	Jacob H. Gallinger (R)
51st (1889–1891)	Alonzo Nute (R)	Orren C. Moore (R)
52nd (1891–1893)	Luther F. McKinney (D)	Warren F. Daniell (D)
53rd (1893–1895)	Henry W. Blair (R)	Henry M. Baker (R)
54th (1895–1897)	Cyrus A. Sulloway (R)	Henry M. Baker (R)
55th (1897–1899)	Cyrus A. Sulloway (R)	Frank G. Clarke (R)
56th (1899–1901)	Cyrus A. Sulloway (R)	Frank G. Clarke (R)
57th (1901–1903)	Cyrus A. Sulloway (R)	Frank D. Currier (R)
58th (1903–1905)	Cyrus A. Sulloway (R)	Frank D. Currier (R)
59th (1905–1907)	Cyrus A. Sulloway (R)	Frank D. Currier (R)
60th (1907–1909)	Cyrus A. Sulloway (R)	Frank D. Currier (R)
61st (1909–1911)	Cyrus A. Sulloway (R)	Frank D. Currier (R)
62nd (1911–1913)	Cyrus A. Sulloway (R)	Frank D. Currier (R)
63rd (1913–1915)	Eugene E. Reed (D)	Raymond B. Stevens (D)
64th (1915–1917)	Cyrus A. Sulloway (R)	Edward Hills; Wason (R)
65th (1917–1919)	Sherman Everett; Burroughs (R)	Edward Hills; Wason (R)
66th (1919–1921)	Sherman Everett; Burroughs (R)	Edward Hills; Wason (R)
67th (1921–1923)	Sherman Everett; Burroughs (R)	Edward Hills; Wason (R)
68th (1923–1925)	William N. Rogers (D)	Edward Hills; Wason (R)
69th (1925–1927)	Fletcher Hale (R)	Edward Hills; Wason (R)
70th (1927–1929)	Fletcher Hale (R)	Edward Hills; Wason (R)
71st (1929–1931)	Fletcher Hale (R)	Edward Hills; Wason (R)
72nd (1931–1933)	William N. Rogers (D)	Edward Hills; Wason (R)
73rd (1933–1935)	William N. Rogers (D)	Charles W. Tobey (R)
74th (1935–1937)	William N. Rogers (D)	Charles W. Tobey (R)
75th (1937–1939)	Arthur B. Jenks (R)	Charles W. Tobey (R)
75th (1937–1939)	Alphonse Roy (D)	Charles W. Tobey (R)
76th (1939–1941)	Arthur B. Jenks (R)	Foster W. Stearns (R)
77th (1941–1943)	Arthur B. Jenks (R)	Foster W. Stearns (R)
78th (1943–1945)	Chester E. Merrow (R)	Foster W. Stearns (R)
79th (1945–1947)	Chester E. Merrow (R)	Sherman Adams (R)
80th (1947–1949)	Chester E. Merrow (R)	Norris Cotton (R)
81st (1949–1951)	Chester E. Merrow (R)	Norris Cotton (R)
82nd (1951–1953)	Chester E. Merrow (R)	Norris Cotton (R)
83rd (1953–1955)	Chester E. Merrow (R)	Norris Cotton (R)
84th (1955–1957)	Chester E. Merrow (R)	Perkins Bass (R)
85th (1957–1959)	Chester E. Merrow (R)	Perkins Bass (R)
86th (1959–1961)	Chester E. Merrow (R)	Perkins Bass (R)
87th (1961–1963)	Chester E. Merrow (R)	Perkins Bass (R)
88th (1963–1965)	Louis C. Wyman (R)	James Colgate; Cleveland (R)
89th (1965–1967)	J. Oliva Huot (D)	James Colgate; Cleveland (R)
90th (1967–1969)	Louis C. Wyman (R)	James Colgate; Cleveland (R)
91st (1969–1971)	Louis C. Wyman (R)	James Colgate; Cleveland (R)
92nd (1971–1973)	Louis C. Wyman (R)	James Colgate; Cleveland (R)
93rd (1973–1975)	Louis C. Wyman (R)	James Colgate; Cleveland (R)
94th (1975–1977)	Norman D'Amours (D)	James Colgate; Cleveland (R)
95th (1977–1979)	Norman D'Amours (D)	James Colgate; Cleveland (R)
96th (1979–1981)	Norman D'Amours (D)	James Colgate; Cleveland (R)
97th (1981–1983)	Norman D'Amours (D)	Judd Gregg (R)
98th (1983–1985)	Norman D'Amours (D)	Judd Gregg (R)
99th (1985–1987)	Bob Smith (R)	Judd Gregg (R)
100th (1987–1989)	Bob Smith (R)	Judd Gregg (R)
101st (1989–1991)	Bob Smith (R)	Chuck Douglas (R)
102nd (1991–1993)	Bill Zeliff (R)	Richard N. Swett (D)
103rd (1993–1995)	Bill Zeliff (R)	Richard N. Swett (D)
104th (1995–1997)	Bill Zeliff (R)	Charles Bass (R)
105th (1997–1999)	John E. Sununu (R)	Charles Bass (R)
106th (1999–2001)	John E. Sununu (R)	Charles Bass (R)
107th (2001–2003)	John E. Sununu (R)	Charles Bass (R)
108th (2003–2005)	Jeb Bradley (R)	Charles Bass (R)
109th (2005–2007)	Jeb Bradley (R)	Charles Bass (R)
110th (2007–2009)	Carol Shea-Porter (D)	Paul Hodes (D)
111th (2009–2011)	Carol Shea-Porter (D)	Paul Hodes (D)
112th (2011–2013)	Frank Guinta (R)	Charles Bass (R)
113th (2013–2015)	Carol Shea-Porter (D)	Annie Kuster (D)
114th (2015–2017)	Frank Guinta (R)	Annie Kuster (D)
115th (2017–2019)	Carol Shea-Porter (D)	Annie Kuster (D)
116th (2019–2021)	Chris Pappas (D)	Annie Kuster (D)
117th (2021–2023)	Chris Pappas (D)	Annie Kuster (D)
118th (2023–2025)	Chris Pappas (D)	Annie Kuster (D)
119th (2025–2027)	Chris Pappas (D)	Maggie Goodlander (D)
120th (2025–2027)	Stefany Shaheen (D)	Maggie Goodlander (D)

== Key ==
Anti-Administration (AA)
Democratic (D)
Democratic-Republican (DR)
Federalist (F)
Pro-Administration (PA)
Free Soil (FS)
Jacksonian (J)
Liberty (Lty)
National Republican (NR)
Opposition Northern (O)
Republican (R)
Whig (W)

== See also ==
- List of United States congressional districts
- New Hampshire's congressional districts
- Political party strength in New Hampshire
