= List of United States representatives from New Hampshire =

The following is an alphabetical list of United States representatives from the state of New Hampshire. For chronological tables of members of both houses of the United States Congress from the state (through the present day), see New Hampshire's congressional delegations. The list of names should be complete, but other data may be incomplete.

== Current representatives ==
As of January 2025

- 1st district: Chris Pappas (D) (since 2019)
- 2nd district: Maggie Goodlander (D) (since 2025)

== List of members ==
Member	Party	Years	District	Electoral history
Sherman Adams	Republican	January 3, 1945 – January 3, 1947	2nd	Elected in 1944. Retired to run for governor.
Charles G. Atherton	Democratic	March 4, 1837 – March 3, 1843	At-large	Elected in 1837. Retired to run for U.S. senator.
Charles Humphrey Atherton	Federalist	March 4, 1815 – March 3, 1817	At-large	Elected in 1814. Retired.
Henry Moore Baker	Republican	March 4, 1893 – March 3, 1897	2nd	Elected in 1892. Retired.
David Barker Jr.	Anti-Jacksonian	March 4, 1827 – March 3, 1829	At-large	Elected in 1827. Lost re-election to Hammons.
Ichabod Bartlett	Democratic-Republican (Adams-Clay)	March 4, 1823 – March 3, 1825	At-large	Elected in 1822. Switched parties.
Ichabod Bartlett	Anti-Jacksonian	March 4, 1825 – March 3, 1829	At-large	Re-elected in 1824 as an Anti-Jacksonian. Retired.
Josiah Bartlett Jr.	Democratic-Republican	March 4, 1811 – March 3, 1813	At-large	Elected in 1810. Retired.
Charlie Bass	Republican	January 3, 1995 – January 3, 2007	2nd	Elected in 1994. Lost re-election to Hodes.
Charlie Bass	Republican	January 3, 2011 – January 3, 2013	2nd	Elected in 2010. Lost re-election to Kuster.
Perkins Bass	Republican	January 3, 1955 – January 3, 1963	2nd	Elected in 1954. Retired to run for U.S. senator.
Benning M. Bean	Jacksonian	March 4, 1833 – March 3, 1837	At-large	Elected in 1833. Retired.
Samuel Newell Bell	Democratic	March 4, 1871 – March 3, 1873	2nd	Elected in 1871. Lost re-election to A. Pike.
Samuel Newell Bell	Democratic	March 4, 1875 – March 3, 1877	2nd	Elected in 1875. Retired.
Jacob Benton	Republican	March 4, 1867 – March 3, 1871	3rd	Elected in 1867. Retired.
Silas Betton	Federalist	March 4, 1803 – March 3, 1807	At-large	Elected in 1802. Lost re-election to Carleton.
Henry William Blair	Republican	March 4, 1875 – March 3, 1879	3rd	Elected in 1875. Retired to run for U.S. senator.
Henry William Blair	Republican	March 4, 1893 – March 3, 1895	1st	Elected in 1892. Retired.
Daniel Blaisdell	Federalist	March 4, 1809 – March 3, 1811	At-large	Elected in 1808. Lost re-election to Bartlett.
Jeb Bradley	Republican	January 3, 2003 – January 3, 2007	1st	Elected in 2002. Lost re-election to Shea-Porter.
James F. Briggs	Republican	March 4, 1877 – March 3, 1883	2nd	Elected in 1877. Retired.
John Brodhead	Jacksonian	March 4, 1829 – March 3, 1833	At-large	Elected in 1829. Retired.
Titus Brown	Anti-Jacksonian	March 8, 1825 – March 3, 1829	At-large	Elected to finish representative-elect Miller's term. Retired.
Joseph Buffum Jr.	Democratic-Republican	March 4, 1819 – March 3, 1821	At-large	Elected in 1819. Retired.
Edmund Burke	Democratic	March 4, 1839 – March 3, 1845	At-large	Elected in 1839. Retired.
Robert Burns	Jacksonian	March 4, 1833 – March 3, 1837	At-large	Elected in 1833. Retired.
Sherman Everett Burroughs	Republican	March 4, 1917 – January 27, 1923	1st	Elected to finish Sulloway's term. Retired and died before next term began.
Josiah Butler	Democratic-Republican	March 4, 1817 – March 3, 1823	At-large	Elected in 1816. Retired.
Peter Carleton	Democratic-Republican	March 4, 1807 – March 3, 1809	At-large	Elected in 1806. Retired.
John Curtis Chamberlain	Federalist	March 4, 1809 – March 3, 1811	At-large	Elected in 1808. Retired.
Thomas Chandler	Jacksonian	March 4, 1829 – March 3, 1833	At-large	Elected in 1829. Retired.
Bradbury Cilley	Federalist	March 4, 1813 – March 3, 1817	At-large	Elected in 1812. Lost re-election to Butler.
Clifton Clagett	Federalist	March 4, 1803 – March 3, 1805	At-large	Elected in 1802. Retired.
Clifton Clagett	Democratic-Republican	March 4, 1817 – March 3, 1821	At-large	Elected in 1816. Lost re-election to M. Harvey.
Frank Gay Clarke	Republican	March 4, 1897 – January 9, 1901	2nd	Elected in 1896. Retired and died before next term began.
James Colgate Cleveland	Republican	January 3, 1963 – January 3, 1981	2nd	Elected in 1962. Retired.
Norris H. Cotton	Republican	January 3, 1947 – November 7, 1954	2nd	Elected in 1946. Retired to run for U.S. senator and resigned when elected.
Aaron H. Cragin	American	March 4, 1855 – March 3, 1857	3rd	Elected in 1855. Switched parties.
Aaron H. Cragin	Republican	March 4, 1857 – March 3, 1859	3rd	Re-elected in 1857 as a Republican. Retired.
Frank Dunklee Currier	Republican	March 4, 1901 – March 3, 1913	2nd	Elected in 1900. Lost re-election to R. Stevens.
Samuel Cushman	Jacksonian	March 4, 1835 – March 3, 1837	At-large	Elected in 1835. Switched parties.
Samuel Cushman	Democratic	March 4, 1837 – March 3, 1839	At-large	Re-elected in 1837 as a Democrat. Retired.
Norman D'Amours	Democratic	January 3, 1975 – January 3, 1985	1st	Elected in 1974. Retired to run for U.S. Senator.
Warren F. Daniell	Democratic	March 4, 1891 – March 3, 1893	2nd	Elected in 1890. Retired.
Samuel Dinsmoor	Democratic-Republican	March 4, 1811 – March 3, 1813	At-large	Elected in 1810. Lost re-election to S. Smith.
Charles Douglas III	Republican	January 3, 1989 – January 3, 1991	2nd	Elected in 1988. Lost re-election to Swett.
Daniel Meserve Durell	Democratic-Republican	March 4, 1807 – March 3, 1809	At-large	Elected in 1806. Lost re-election to Chamberlain.
Ira Allen Eastman	Democratic	March 4, 1839 – March 3, 1843	At-large	Elected in 1839. Retired.
Nehemiah Eastman	Anti-Jacksonian	March 4, 1825 – March 3, 1827	At-large	Elected in 1824. Lost re-election to Barker.
Thomas M. Edwards	Republican	March 4, 1859 – March 3, 1863	3rd	Elected in 1859. Retired.
Jacob Hart Ela	Republican	March 4, 1867 – March 3, 1871	1st	Elected in 1867. Retired.
Caleb Ellis	Federalist	March 4, 1805 – March 3, 1807	At-large	Elected in 1804. Lost re-election to Storer.
Evarts Worcester Farr	Republican	March 4, 1879 – November 30, 1880	3rd	Elected in 1878. Died.
James Farrington	Democratic	March 4, 1837 – March 3, 1839	At-large	Elected in 1837. Retired.
Abiel Foster	Pro-Administration	June 23, 1789 – March 3, 1791	At-large	Elected to finish representative-elect Benjamin West's term.. Lost re-election to J. Smith.
Abiel Foster	Federalist	March 4, 1795 – March 3, 1803	At-large	Elected in 1794. Retired.
Jonathan Freeman	Federalist	March 4, 1797 – March 3, 1801	At-large	Elected in 1796. Retired.
Jacob H. Gallinger	Republican	March 4, 1885 – March 3, 1889	2nd	Elected in 1884. Retired.
Francis Gardner	Democratic-Republican	March 4, 1807 – March 3, 1809	At-large	Elected in 1806. Lost re-election to W. Hale.
Nicholas Gilman	Pro-Administration	March 4, 1789 – March 3, 1795	At-large	Elected in 1789. Switched parties.
Nicholas Gilman	Federalist	March 4, 1795 – March 3, 1797	At-large	Re-elected in 1794 as a Federalist. Retired.
Maggie Goodlander	Democratic	January 3, 2025 – present	2nd	Elected in 2024. Incumbent.
William Gordon	Federalist	March 4, 1797 – June 12, 1800	At-large	Elected in 1796. Resigned to become New Hampshire Attorney General.
Judd Gregg	Republican	January 3, 1981 – January 3, 1989	2nd	Elected in 1980. Retired to run for governor.
Frank Guinta	Republican	January 3, 2011 – January 3, 2013	1st	Elected in 2010. Lost re-election to Shea-Porter.
Frank Guinta	Republican	January 3, 2015 – January 3, 2017	1st	Elected in 2012. Lost re-election to Shea-Porter.
Fletcher Hale	Republican	March 4, 1925 – October 22, 1931	1st	Elected in 1924. Died.
John P. Hale	Democratic	March 4, 1843 – March 3, 1845	At-large	Elected in 1843. Lost re-election but seat remained vacant as no candidate received a majority of votes.
Salma Hale	Democratic-Republican	March 4, 1817 – March 3, 1819	At-large	Elected in 1816. Retired.
William Hale	Federalist	March 4, 1809 – March 3, 1811	At-large	Elected in 1808. Lost re-election to O. Hall.
William Hale	Federalist	March 4, 1813 – March 3, 1817	At-large	Elected in 1812. Lost re-election to Clagett.
Joshua G. Hall	Republican	March 4, 1879 – March 3, 1883	1st	Elected in 1878. Retired.
Obed Hall	Democratic-Republican	March 4, 1811 – March 3, 1813	At-large	Elected in 1811. Retired.
Joseph Hammons	Jacksonian	March 4, 1829 – March 3, 1833	At-large	Elected in 1829. Retired.
John Adams Harper	Democratic-Republican	March 4, 1811 – March 3, 1813	At-large	Elected in 1811. Lost re-election to Vose.
Joseph M. Harper	Jacksonian	March 4, 1831 – March 3, 1835	At-large	Elected in 1831. Retired.
Jonathan Harvey	Jacksonian	March 4, 1825 – March 3, 1831	At-large	Elected in 1824. Retired.
Matthew Harvey	Democratic-Republican	March 4, 1821 – March 3, 1823	At-large	Elected in 1820. Switched parties.
Matthew Harvey	Democratic-Republican (Adams-Clay)	March 4, 1823 – March 3, 1825	At-large	Re-elected in 1822 as a Democratic-Republican. Retired.
Nathaniel Appleton Haven	Federalist	March 4, 1809 – March 3, 1811	At-large	Elected in 1808. Retired.
Martin Alonzo Haynes	Republican	March 4, 1883 – March 3, 1887	1st	Elected in 1882. Lost re-election to McKinney.
Joseph Healy	Anti-Jacksonian	March 4, 1825 – March 3, 1829	At-large	Elected in 1824. Retired.
Ellery Albee Hibbard	Democratic	March 4, 1871 – March 3, 1873	1st	Elected in 1871. Lost re-election to Small.
Harry Hibbard	Democratic	March 4, 1849 – March 3, 1853	4th	Elected in 1849. Redistricted to the 3rd district.
Harry Hibbard	Democratic	March 4, 1853 – March 3, 1855	3rd	Redistricted from the 4th district and re-elected in 1853. Retired.
Paul Hodes	Democratic	January 3, 2007 – January 3, 2011	2nd	Elected in 2006. Retired to run for U.S. senator.
David Hough	Federalist	March 4, 1803 – March 3, 1807	At-large	Elected in 1802. Lost re-election to J.K. Smith.
Henry Hubbard	Jacksonian	March 4, 1829 – March 3, 1835	At-large	Elected in 1829. Retired to run for U.S. senator.
Samuel Hunt	Federalist	December 6, 1802 – March 3, 1805	At-large	Elected to finish Peirce's term. Retired.
Joseph Oliva Huot	Democratic	January 3, 1965 – January 3, 1967	1st	Elected in 1964. Lost re-election to Wyman.
Arthur B. Jenks	Republican	January 3, 1937 – June 9, 1938	1st	Elected in 1936. Lost contested election to Roy.
Arthur B. Jenks	Republican	January 3, 1939 – January 3, 1943	1st	Elected in 1938. Lost renomination to Merrow.
James Hutchins Johnson	Democratic	March 4, 1845 – March 3, 1847	At-large	Elected in 1845. Redistricted to the 4th district.
James Hutchins Johnson	Democratic	March 4, 1847 – March 3, 1849	4th	Redistricted from the at-large district and re-elected in 1847. Retired.
Frank Jones	Democratic	March 4, 1875 – March 3, 1879	1st	Elected in 1875. Retired.
George W. Kittredge	Democratic	March 4, 1853 – March 3, 1855	1st	Elected in 1853. Lost re-election to J. Pike.
Ann McLane Kuster	Democratic	January 3, 2013 – January 3, 2025	2nd	Elected in 2012. Retired.
Arthur Livermore	Democratic-Republican	March 4, 1817 – March 3, 1821	At-large	Elected in 1816. Retired.
Arthur Livermore	Democratic-Republican (Adams-Clay)	March 4, 1823 – March 3, 1825	At-large	Elected in 1823. Lost re-election to James Miller.
Samuel Livermore	Federalist	March 4, 1789 – March 3, 1793	At-large	Elected in 1789. Retired.
Daniel Marcy	Democratic	March 4, 1863 – March 3, 1865	1st	Elected in 1863. Lost re-election to Marston.
Gilman Marston	Republican	March 4, 1859 – March 3, 1863	1st	Elected in 1859. Retired to serve in the Union Army.
Gilman Marston	Republican	March 4, 1865 – March 3, 1867	1st	Elected in 1865. Lost re-election to Ela.
Aaron Matson	Democratic-Republican	March 4, 1821 – March 3, 1823	At-large	Elected in 1820. Switched parties.
Aaron Matson	Democratic-Republican (Adams-Clay)	March 4, 1823 –March 4, 1825	At-large	Re-elected in 1822 as a Democratic-Republican. Retired.
Luther F. McKinney	Democratic	March 4, 1887 – March 3, 1889	1st	Elected in 1886. Lost re-election to Nute.
Luther F. McKinney	Democratic	March 4, 1891 – March 3, 1893	1st	Elected in 1890. Retired to run for governor.
Charles Earl Merrow	Republican	January 3, 1943 – January 3, 1963	1st	First elected in 1942. Retired to run for U.S. Senator.
Orren C. Moore	Republican	March 4, 1889 – March 3, 1891	2nd	Elected in 1888. Lost re-election to Daniell.
George W. Morrison	Democratic	October 8, 1850 – March 3, 1851	3rd	Elected to finish Wilson's term. Lost re-election to Perkins.
George W. Morrison	Democratic	March 4, 1853 – March 3, 1855	2nd	Elected to 1853. Lost re-election to Tappan.
Mace Moulton	Democratic	March 4, 1845 – March 3, 1847	At-large	Elected in 1845. Redistricted to the 3rd district and lost re-election to J. Wilson II.
Moses Norris Jr.	Democratic	March 4, 1843 – March 3, 1847	At-large	Elected in 1843. Retired.
Alonzo Nute	Republican	March 4, 1889 – March 3, 1891	1st	Elected in 1888. Retired to run for governor.
Chris Pappas	Democratic	January 3, 2019 – present	1st	Elected in 2018. Incumbent. Retiring to run for U.S. senator.
Hosea Washington Parker	Democratic	March 4, 1871 – March 3, 1875	3rd	Elected in 1871. Lost re-election to Blair.
John Parrott	Democratic-Republican	March 4, 1817 – March 3, 1819	At-large	Elected in 1816. Retired to run for U.S. senator.
James W. Patterson	Republican	March 4, 1863 – March 3, 1867	3rd	Elected in 1863. Retired to run for U.S. senator.
Charles H. Peaslee	Democratic	March 4, 1847 – March 3, 1853	2nd	Elected in 1847. Retired.
Joseph Peirce	Federalist	March 4, 1801 – ????, 1802	At-large	Elected in 1800. Resigned.
Jared Perkins	Whig	March 4, 1851 – March 3, 1853	3rd	Elected in 1851. Lost re-election to H. Hibbard.
Franklin Pierce	Jacksonian	March 4, 1833 – March 3, 1837	At-large	Elected in 1833. Retired to run for U.S. Senator.
Austin F. Pike	Republican	March 4, 1873 – March 3, 1875	2nd	Elected in 1873. Retired.
James Pike	Know Nothing	March 4, 1855 – March 3, 1857	1st	Elected in 1855. Switched parties.
James Pike	Republican	March 4, 1857 – March 3, 1859	1st	Re-elected in 1857 as a Republican. Retired.
William Plumer Jr.	Democratic-Republican	March 4, 1819 – March 3, 1823	At-large	Elected in 1819. Switched parties.
William Plumer Jr.	Democratic-Republican (Adams-Clay)	March 4, 1823 – March 3, 1825	At-large	Re-elected in 1822 as a Democratic-Republican. Retired.
Ossian Ray	Republican	March 4, 1881 – March 3, 1883	3rd	Elected to finish Farr's term. Redistricted to the 2nd district.
Ossian Ray	Republican	March 4, 1883 – March 3, 1885	2nd	Redistricted from the 3rd district and re-elected in 1882. Retired.
John Randall Reding	Democratic	March 4, 1841 – March 3, 1845	At-large	Elected in 1841. Retired.
Eugene Elliott Reed	Democratic	March 4, 1913 – March 3, 1915	1st	Elected in 1912. Lost re-election to Sulloway.
William Nathaniel Rogers	Democratic	March 4, 1923 – March 3, 1925	1st	Elected in 1922. Lost re-election to F. Hale.
William Nathaniel Rogers	Democratic	January 5, 1932 – January 3, 1937	1st	Elected to finish Hale's term. Retired to run for U.S. senator.
Edward H. Rollins	Republican	March 4, 1861 – March 3, 1867	2nd	Elected in 1861. Retired.
Alphonse Roy	Democratic	June 9, 1938 – January 3, 1939	1st	Won contested election. Lost re-election to Jenks.
Tristram Shaw	Democratic	March 4, 1839 – March 3, 1843	At-large	Elected in 1839. Retired.
James Sheafe	Federalist	March 4, 1799 – March 3, 1801	At-large	Elected to finish Sprague's term. Retired.
Carol Shea-Porter	Democratic	January 3, 2007 – January 3, 2011	1st	Elected in 2006. Lost re-election to Guinta.
Carol Shea-Porter	Democratic	January 3, 2013 – January 3, 2015	1st	Elected in 2012. Lost re-election to Guinta.
Carol Shea-Porter	Democratic	January 3, 2017 – January 3, 2019	1st	Elected in 2016. Retired.
John Samuel Sherburne	Anti-Administration	March 4, 1793 – March 3, 1795	At-large	Elected in 1792. Retired.
John Samuel Sherburne	Democratic-Republican	March 4, 1795 – March 3, 1797	At-large	[data missing]
William B. Small	Republican	March 4, 1873 – March 3, 1875	1st	Elected in 1873. Retired.
Jedediah K. Smith	Democratic-Republican	March 4, 1807 – March 3, 1809	At-large	Elected in 1806. Lost re-election to Haven.
Jeremiah Smith	Pro-Administration	March 4, 1791 – March 3, 1795	At-large	Elected in 1790. Switched parties.
Jeremiah Smith	Federalist	March 4, 1795 – July 26, 1797	At-large	Re-elected in 1794 as a Federalist. Resigned.
Bob Smith	Republican	January 3, 1985 – December 7, 1990	1st	Elected in 1984. Resigned when appointed U.S. Senator.
Samuel Smith	Federalist	March 4, 1813 – March 3, 1815	At-large	Elected in 1812. Resigned. (Note: Samuel Smith's resignation is not mentioned in the Congressional Biography.)
Peleg Sprague	Federalist	December 15, 1797 – March 3, 1799	At-large	Elected to finish J. Smith's term. Re-elected but declined to serve.
Foster Waterman Stearns	Republican	January 3, 1939 – January 3, 1945	2nd	Elected in 1938. Retired to run for U.S. Senator.
Aaron Fletcher Stevens	Republican	March 4, 1867 – March 3, 1871	2nd	Elected in 1867. Lost re-election to Bell.
Raymond Bartlett Stevens	Democratic	March 4, 1913 – March 3, 1915	2nd	Elected in 1912. Retired to run for U.S. Senator.
Clement Storer	Democratic-Republican	March 4, 1807 – March 3, 1809	At-large	Elected in 1806. Lost re-election to J. Wilson I.
George Sullivan	Federalist	March 4, 1811 – March 3, 1813	At-large	Elected in 1811. Retired.
Cyrus Adams Sulloway	Republican	March 4, 1895 – March 3, 1913	1st	Elected in 1894. Lost re-election to Reed.
Cyrus Adams Sulloway	Republican	March 4, 1915 – March 11, 1917	1st	Elected in 1914. Died.
John E. Sununu	Republican	January 3, 1997 – January 3, 2003	1st	Elected in 1996. Retired to run for U.S. Senator.
Richard Swett	Democratic	January 3, 1991 – January 3, 1995	2nd	Elected in 1990. Lost re-election to Bass.
Mason W. Tappan	Know Nothing	March 4, 1855 – March 3, 1857	2nd	Elected in 1855. Switched parties.
Mason W. Tappan	Republican	March 4, 1857 – March 3, 1861	2nd	Re-elected in 1857 as a Republican. Retired.
Samuel Tenney	Federalist	December 8, 1800 – March 3, 1807	At-large	Elected in 1800. Lost re-election to Gardner.
Thomas W. Thompson	Federalist	March 4, 1805 – March 3, 1807	At-large	Elected in 1804. Lost re-election to Durell.
Charles William Tobey	Republican	March 4, 1933 – January 3, 1939	2nd	Elected in 1932. Retired to run for U.S. Senator.
Amos Tuck	Independent	March 4, 1847 – March 3, 1849	1st	Elected in 1847. Joined Free Soil party.
Amos Tuck	Free Soil	March 4, 1849 – March 3, 1851	1st	Re-elected in 1849 as a Free Soil candidate. Switched parties.
Amos Tuck	Whig	March 4, 1851 – March 3, 1853	1st	Re-elected in 1851 as a Whig. Lost re-election to Kittredge.
George B. Upham	Federalist	March 4, 1801 – March 3, 1803	At-large	Elected in 1800. Retired.
Nathaniel Upham	Democratic-Republican	March 4, 1817 – March 3, 1823	At-large	Elected in 1816. Retired.
Roger Vose	Federalist	March 4, 1813 – March 3, 1817	At-large	Elected in 1812. Lost re-election to S. Hale.
Edward Hills Wason	Republican	March 4, 1915 – March 3, 1933	2nd	Elected in 1914. Retired.
Daniel Webster	Federalist	March 4, 1813 – March 3, 1817	At-large	Elected in 1812. Retired.
John W. Weeks	Jacksonian	March 4, 1829 – March 3, 1833	At-large	Lost re-election.Elected in 1829. Retired.
Joseph Weeks	Jacksonian	March 4, 1835 – March 3, 1837	At-large	Elected in 1835. Switched parties.
Joseph Weeks	Democratic	March 4, 1837 – March 3, 1839	At-large	Re-elected in 1837 as a Democrat. Retired.
Thomas Whipple Jr.	Democratic-Republican	March 4, 1821 – March 3, 1823	At-large	Elected in 1820. Switched parties.
Thomas Whipple Jr.	Democratic-Republican (Adams-Clay)	March 4, 1823 – March 3, 1825	At-large	Re-elected in 1822 as a Democratic-Republican. Switched parties.
Thomas Whipple Jr.	Anti-Jacksonian	March 4, 1825 – March 3, 1829	At-large	Re-elected in 1824 as an Anti-Jacksonian. Retired.
Jeduthun Wilcox	Federalist	March 4, 1813 – March 3, 1817	At-large	Elected in 1812. Lost re-election to Parrott.
Jared W. Williams	Democratic	March 4, 1837 – March 3, 1841	At-large	Elected in 1837. Retired.
James Wilson I	Federalist	March 4, 1809 – March 3, 1811	At-large	Elected in 1808. Lost re-election to Sullivan.
James Wilson II	Whig	March 4, 1847 – September 9, 1850	3rd	Elected in 1847. Resigned.
Paine Wingate	Pro-Administration	March 4, 1793 – March 3, 1795	At-large	Elected in 1792. Lost re-election to Foster.
Louis C. Wyman	Republican	January 3, 1963 – January 3, 1965	1st	Elected in 1962. Lost re-election to Huot.
Louis C. Wyman	Republican	January 3, 1967 – December 31, 1974	1st	Elected in 1966. Retired to run for U.S. senator and resigned when appointed. (Note: The previous senator Norris Cotton resigned after election and governor Meldrim Thomson appointed him to the vacant term. Wyman lost the special election.)
Bill Zeliff	Republican	January 3, 1991 – January 3, 1997	1st	Elected in 1990. Retired to run for governor.

== See also ==
- List of United States senators from New Hampshire
- New Hampshire's congressional delegations
- New Hampshire's congressional districts
