= 1800 New Hampshire's at-large congressional district special election =

A special election was held in New Hampshire's at-large congressional district on August 25, 1800, to fill a vacancy left by William Gordon (F) resigning to accept an appointment as New Hampshire Attorney General on June 12, 1800.

== Election results ==
New Hampshire electoral law required a majority for election, which was not met on the first ballot, requiring a run-off election on October 27, 1800

Candidate	Party	First ballot		Runoff	
Candidate	Party	Votes	Percent	Votes	Percent
Samuel Tenney	Federalist	2,921	45.6%	1,818	70.8%
George Upham	Federalist	1,377	21.5%	750	29.2%
John Goddard	Democratic-Republican	835	13.0%		
Joseph Badger	Democratic-Republican	699	10.9%		
Thomas Cogswell	Democratic-Republican	296	4.6%		
Joseph Peirce	Federalist	278	4.3%		

Tenney took his seat on December 8, 1800.

== See also ==
- List of special elections to the United States House of Representatives
- United States House of Representatives election in New Hampshire, 1800
- United States House of Representatives elections, 1800 and 1801
