= Samuel Tenney House =

Historic house in New Hampshire, United States

- U.S. National Register of Historic Places
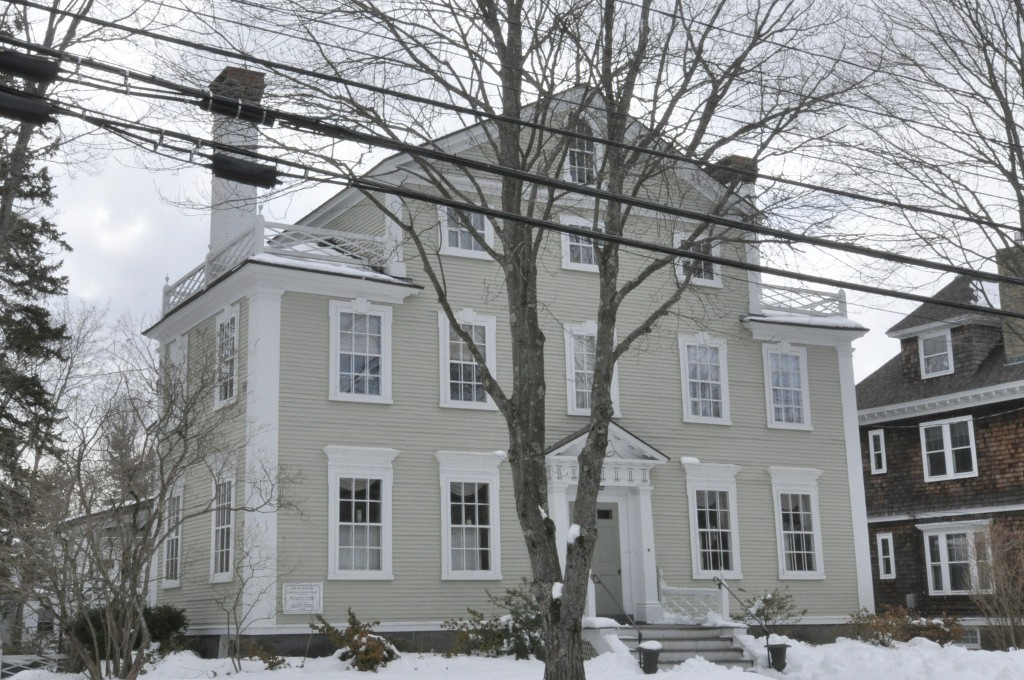

- Location within New Hampshire Location within the United States
- Location: Exeter, New Hampshire
- Coordinates: 42°58′49″N 70°56′23″W
- Architect: Ebenezer Clifford with Bradbury Johnson
- NRHP reference No.: 80000306
- Added to NRHP: November 25, 1980

The Samuel Tenney House is an historic house at 65 High Street in Exeter, New Hampshire. This mansion was built circa 1800 as the primary residence of Samuel Tenney, a noted scholar, scientist, physician, American Revolutionary War surgeon, patriot, judge, and member of Congress, and his wife Tabitha Gilman Tenney, the noted early American author.

The master carpenter for the house was Ebenezer Clifford working with Bradbury Johnson. At the time, Clifford lived in the Gilman Garrison House, now owned by Historic New England. They also built the First Church, Exeter; the second Phillips Exeter Academy main building; and the Atkinson Academy building.

Mrs. Tenney died in 1837, and the house was later occupied by Tristram Shaw, who was a member of the U.S. House of Representatives, representing New Hampshire from 1830 until his death in 1843. In January 1892, Dr. George W. Dearborn purchased the Samuel Tenney House from Frank H. Hervey.

Today the house is located at 65 High Street, having been relocated there in 1893 from its original location in the center of Exeter, next to and north of the First Church on Front Street, to accommodate construction of the Rockingham County Courthouse. On November 25, 1980, the building was added to the National Register of Historic Places.

== See also ==
- National Register of Historic Places listings in Rockingham County, New Hampshire

== Sources ==
- Postcards from Exeter by Carol Walker Aten. Arcadia Publishing, 2003. Tenney House, Page 90.
- New Hampshire Architecture: an illustrated guide by Bryant Franklin Tolles, Carolyn K. Tolles. New Hampshire Historical Society. UPNE, 1979. Dr. Samuel Tenney House, Page 53.
