= 6th United States Congress =

Meeting of the U.S. federal legislature from 1799 to 1801

←	5th	7th	→
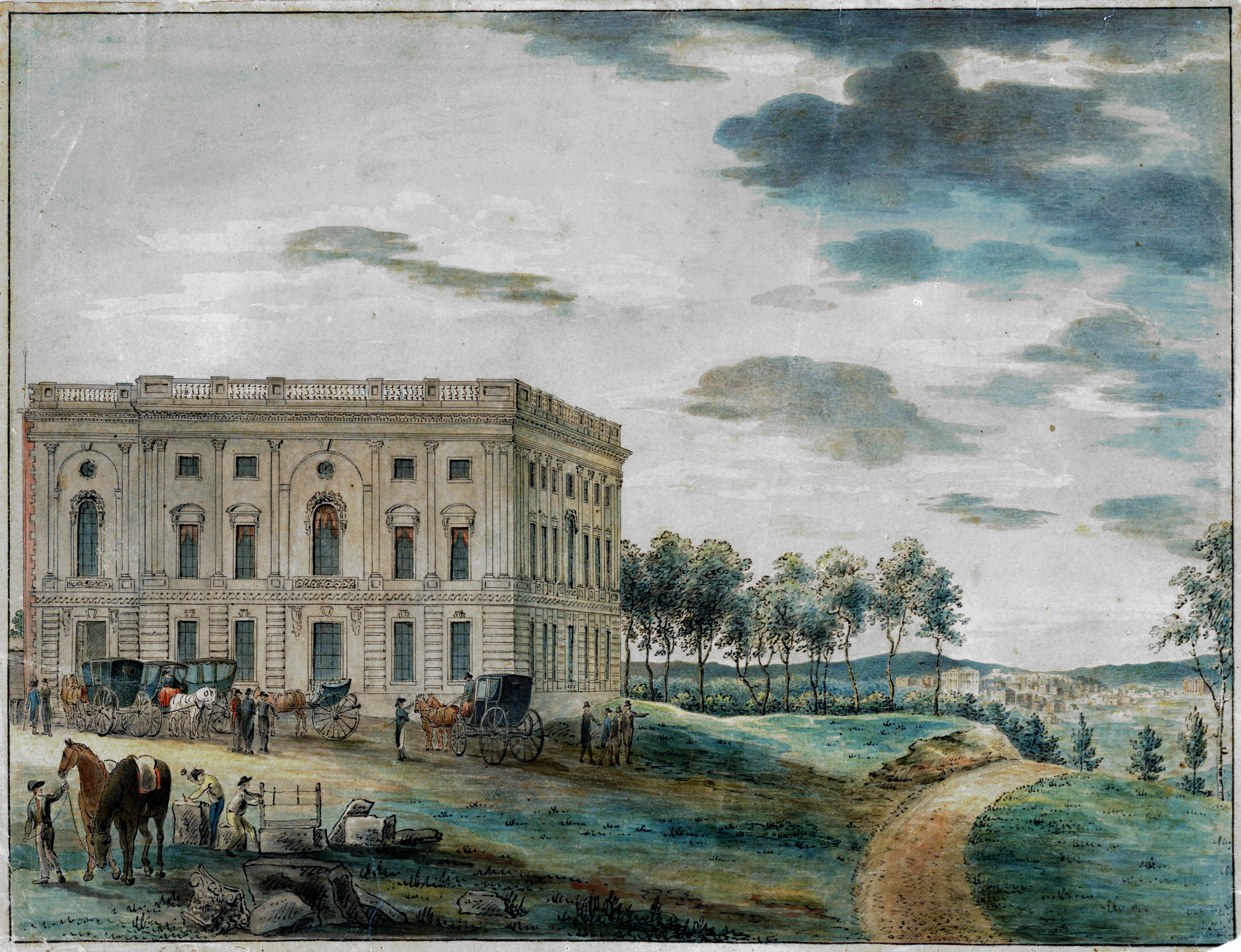
- United States Capitol (1800)

Overview
- Legislative body: United States Congress
- Jurisdiction: United States
- Term: March 4, 1799 – March 3, 1801

Senate
- Members: 32
- President: Thomas Jefferson (DR)
- President pro tempore: Samuel Livermore (F); Uriah Tracy (F); John E. Howard (F); James Hillhouse (F)
- Party control: Federalist

House of Representatives
- Members: 106 representatives 1 non-voting delegates
- Speaker: Theodore Sedgwick (F)
- Party control: Federalist

Sessions
- 1st: December 2, 1799 – May 14, 1800
- 2nd: November 17, 1800 – March 3, 1801

The 6th United States Congress was the 6th meeting of the legislative branch of the United States federal government, consisting of the Senate and the House of Representatives. It initially met at Congress Hall in Philadelphia, Pennsylvania and then was the first congress to meet in the new Capitol Building in Washington, D.C.. Its term was from March 4, 1799, to March 4, 1801, during the last two years of John Adams's presidency. It was the last Congress of the 18th century and the first to convene in the 19th. The apportionment of seats in House of Representatives was based on the 1790 United States census. Both chambers had a Federalist majority. This was the last Congress in which the Federalist Party controlled the presidency or either chamber of Congress.

== Major events ==
- December 14, 1799: Former President George Washington died
- February 24, 1800: Library of Congress founded
- November 17, 1800: Congress held its first session in Washington, D.C.
- January 20, 1801: John Marshall was appointed Chief Justice of the United States
- February 17, 1801: 1800 United States presidential election: Thomas Jefferson became the first President of the United States elected by the House of Representatives as no candidate received a majority of the electoral votes cast in the 1800 presidential election. The House was required to choose between Jefferson and Aaron Burr, with each of the 16 states having a single vote. Jefferson was elected on the 36th ballot by 10 to 4 (with 2 abstentions).

States for Jefferson	States for Burr	States casting blank ballots
Georgia; Kentucky; Maryland; New Jersey; New York; North Carolina; Pennsylvania; Tennessee; Vermont; Virginia	Connecticut; Massachusetts; New Hampshire; Rhode Island	Delaware; South Carolina
Total: 10 (63%)	Total: 4 (25%)	Total: 2 (12%)

== Major legislation ==
- April 4, 1800: Bankruptcy Act of 1800, Sess. 1, ch. 19, 2 Stat. 19
- May 7, 1800: Indiana Organic Act, Sess. 1, ch. 41, 2 Stat. 58; effective July 4, 1800
- May 10, 1800: Slave Trade Act of 1800, Sess. 2, ch. 51, 2 Stat. 70
- February 13, 1801: Judiciary Act of 1801, Sess. 2, ch. 4, 2 Stat. 89
- February 27, 1801: District of Columbia Organic Act of 1801, Sess.2, ch. 15, 2 Stat. 103

== Party summary ==
The count below identifies party affiliations at the beginning of the first session of this Congress, and includes members from vacancies and newly admitted states, when they were first seated. Changes resulting from subsequent replacements are shown below in the "Changes in membership" section.

=== Senate ===
	Party (shading shows control)		Total	Vacant
	Democratic- Republican (DR)	Federalist (F)	Total	Vacant
End of previous congress	9	22	31	1
Begin	9	22	31	1
End	11	21	32	0
Final voting share	34.4%	65.6%		
Beginning of next congress	17	15	32	0

=== House of Representatives ===

	Party (shading shows control)		Total	Vacant
	Democratic- Republican (DR)	Federalist (F)	Total	Vacant
End of previous congress	50	56	106	0
Begin	46	60	106	0
End	49	56	105	1
Final voting share	46.7%	53.3%		
Beginning of next congress	72	33	105	1

== Leadership ==
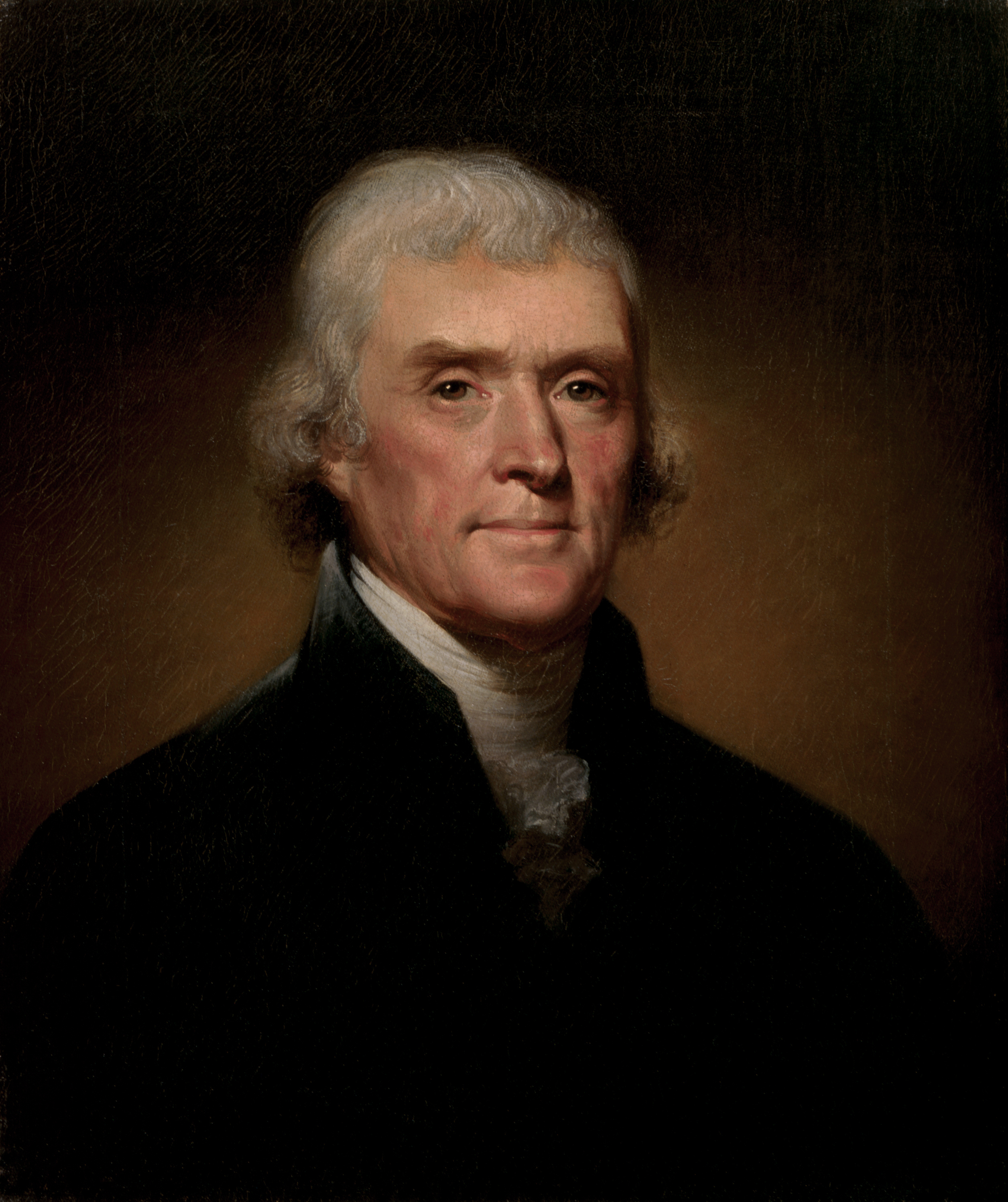
President of the Senate Thomas Jefferson

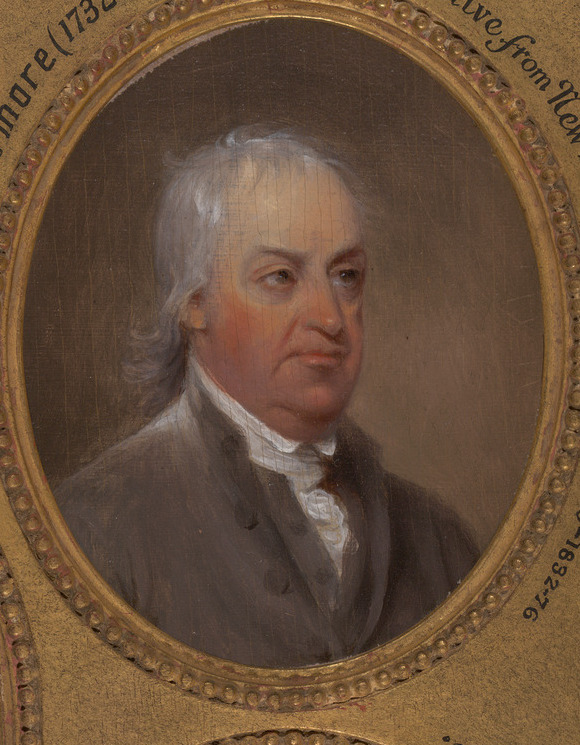
President pro tempore Samuel Livermore

=== Senate ===
- President: Thomas Jefferson (DR)
- President pro tempore: Samuel Livermore (F), elected December 2, 1799
  - Uriah Tracy (F), elected May 14, 1800
  - John E. Howard, (F), elected November 21, 1800
  - James Hillhouse, (F), elected February 28, 1801

=== House of Representatives ===
- Speaker: Theodore Sedgwick (F)

== Members ==
This list is arranged by chamber, then by state. Senators are listed by class, and representatives are listed by district.

Skip to House of Representatives, below

=== Senate ===
Senators were elected by the state legislatures every two years, with one-third beginning new six-year terms with each Congress. Preceding the names in the list below are Senate class numbers, which indicate the cycle of their election. In this Congress, Class 1 meant their term began in the last Congress, requiring re-election in 1802; Class 2 meant their term began in this Congress, requiring re-election in 1804; and Class 3 meant their term ended with this Congress, requiring re-election in 1800.

==== Connecticut ====
▌1. James Hillhouse (F)
▌3. Uriah Tracy (F)

==== Delaware ====
▌1. Henry Latimer (F), until February 28, 1801

▌ Samuel White (F), from February 28, 1801

▌2. William H. Wells (F)

==== Georgia ====
▌2. Abraham Baldwin (DR)
▌3. James Gunn (F)

==== Kentucky ====
▌2. John Brown (DR)
▌3. Humphrey Marshall (F)

==== Maryland ====
▌1. John Eager Howard (F)
▌3. James Lloyd (F), until December 1, 1800

▌ William Hindman (F), from December 12, 1800

==== Massachusetts ====
▌1. Benjamin Goodhue (F), until November 8, 1800

▌ Jonathan Mason (F), from November 14, 1800

▌2. Samuel Dexter (F), until May 30, 1800

▌ Dwight Foster (F), from June 6, 1800

==== New Hampshire ====
▌2. Samuel Livermore (F)
▌3. John Langdon (DR)

==== New Jersey ====
▌1. James Schureman (F), until February 16, 1801

▌ Aaron Ogden (F), from February 28, 1801

▌2. Jonathan Dayton (F)

==== New York ====
▌1. James Watson (F), until March 19, 1800

▌ Gouverneur Morris (F), from April 3, 1800

▌3. John Laurance (F), until August 1800

▌ John Armstrong Jr. (DR), from November 6, 1800

==== North Carolina ====
▌2. Jesse Franklin (DR)
▌3. Timothy Bloodworth (DR)

==== Pennsylvania ====
▌1. James Ross (F)
▌3. William Bingham (F)

==== Rhode Island ====
▌1. Theodore Foster (F)
▌2. Ray Greene (F)

==== South Carolina ====
▌2. Charles Pinckney (DR)
▌3. Jacob Read (F)

==== Tennessee ====
▌1. Joseph Anderson (DR)
▌2. William Cocke (DR)

==== Vermont ====
▌1. Nathaniel Chipman (F)
▌3. Elijah Paine (F)

==== Virginia ====
▌1. Stevens Mason (DR)
▌2. Wilson C. Nicholas (DR), from December 5, 1799

Senators' party membership by state at the opening of the 6th Congress in March 1799. 2 Democratic-Republicans 1 Democratic-Republican and 1 Federalist 2 Federalists

=== House of Representatives ===
The names of representatives elected statewide on the general ticket or otherwise at-large, are preceded by an "At-large," and the names of those elected from districts, whether plural or single member, are preceded by their district numbers.

==== Connecticut ====
All representatives were elected statewide on a general ticket.

▌At-large. Jonathan Brace (F), until May 1800

▌ John Cotton Smith (F), from November 17, 1800

▌At-large. Samuel W. Dana (F)
▌At-large. John Davenport (F)
▌At-large. William Edmond (F)
▌At-large. Chauncey Goodrich (F)
▌At-large. Elizur Goodrich (F)
▌At-large. Roger Griswold (F)

==== Delaware ====
▌At-large. James A. Bayard (F)

==== Georgia ====
Both representatives were elected statewide on a general ticket.

▌At-large. James Jones (F), until January 11, 1801, vacant thereafter
▌At-large. Benjamin Taliaferro (F)

==== Kentucky ====
▌1. Thomas T. Davis (DR)
▌2. John Fowler (DR)

==== Maryland ====
▌1. George Dent (F)
▌2. John C. Thomas (F)
▌3. William Craik (F)
▌4. George Baer Jr. (F)
▌5. Samuel Smith (DR)
▌6. Gabriel Christie (DR)
▌7. Joseph H. Nicholson (DR)
▌8. John Dennis (F)

==== Massachusetts ====
▌1. Theodore Sedgwick (F)
▌2. William Shepard (F)
▌3. Samuel Lyman (F), until November 6, 1800

▌ Ebenezer Mattoon (F), from February 2, 1801

▌4. Dwight Foster (F), until June 6, 1800

▌ Levi Lincoln Sr. (DR), from December 15, 1800

▌5. Lemuel Williams (F)
▌6. John Reed Sr. (F)
▌7. Phanuel Bishop (DR)
▌8. Harrison Gray Otis (F)
▌9. Joseph Bradley Varnum (DR)
▌10. Samuel Sewall (F), until January 10, 1800

▌ Nathan Read (F), from November 25, 1800

▌11. Bailey Bartlett (F)
▌12. Silas Lee (F)
▌13. Peleg Wadsworth (F)
▌14. George Thatcher (F)

==== New Hampshire ====
All representatives were elected statewide on a general ticket.

▌At-large. Abiel Foster (F)
▌At-large. Jonathan Freeman (F)
▌At-large. William Gordon (F), until June 12, 1800

▌ Samuel Tenney (F), from December 8, 1800

▌At-large. James Sheafe (F)

==== New Jersey ====
▌1. John Condit (DR)
▌2. Aaron Kitchell (DR)
▌3. James Linn (DR)
▌4. James H. Imlay (F)
▌5. Franklin Davenport (F)

==== New York ====
▌1. Jonathan N. Havens (DR), until October 25, 1799

▌ John Smith (DR), from February 27, 1800

▌2. Edward Livingston (DR)
▌3. Philip Van Cortlandt (DR)
▌4. Lucas C. Elmendorf (DR)
▌5. Theodorus Bailey (DR)
▌6. John Bird (F)
▌7. John Thompson (DR)
▌8. Henry Glen (F)
▌9. Jonas Platt (F)
▌10. William Cooper (F)

==== North Carolina ====
▌1. Joseph Dickson (F)
▌2. Archibald Henderson (F)
▌3. Robert Williams (DR)
▌4. Richard Stanford (DR)
▌5. Nathaniel Macon (DR)
▌6. William H. Hill (F)
▌7. William Barry Grove (F)
▌8. David Stone (DR)
▌9. Willis Alston (F)
▌10. Richard Dobbs Spaight (DR)

==== Pennsylvania ====
The 4th district was a plural district with two representatives.

▌1. Robert Waln (F)
▌2. Michael Leib (DR)
▌3. Richard Thomas (F)
▌4. Robert Brown (DR)
▌4. John Peter G. Muhlenberg (DR)
▌5. Joseph Hiester (DR)
▌6. John A. Hanna (DR)
▌7. John Wilkes Kittera (F)
▌8. Thomas Hartley (F), until December 21, 1800

▌ John Stewart (DR), from January 15, 1801

▌9. Andrew Gregg (DR)
▌10. Henry Woods (F)
▌11. John Smilie (DR)
▌12. Albert Gallatin (DR)

==== Rhode Island ====
Both representatives were elected statewide on a general ticket.

▌At-large. John Brown (F)
▌At-large. Christopher G. Champlin (F)

==== South Carolina ====
▌1. Thomas Pinckney (F)
▌2. John Rutledge Jr. (F)
▌3. Benjamin Huger (F)
▌4. Thomas Sumter (DR)
▌5. Robert Goodloe Harper (F)
▌6. Abraham Nott (F)

==== Tennessee ====
▌At-large. William C. C. Claiborne (DR)

==== Vermont ====
▌1. Matthew Lyon (DR)
▌2. Lewis R. Morris (F)

==== Virginia ====
▌1. Robert Page (F)
▌2. David Holmes (DR)
▌3. George Jackson (DR)
▌4. Abram Trigg (DR)
▌5. John J. Trigg (DR)
▌6. Matthew Clay (DR)
▌7. John Randolph (DR)
▌8. Samuel Goode (DR)
▌9. Joseph Eggleston (DR)
▌10. Edwin Gray (DR)
▌11. Josiah Parker (F)
▌12. Thomas Evans (F)
▌13. John Marshall (F), until June 7, 1800

▌ Littleton W. Tazewell (DR), from November 26, 1800

▌14. Samuel J. Cabell (DR)
▌15. John Dawson (DR)
▌16. Anthony New (DR)
▌17. Leven Powell (F)
▌18. John Nicholas (DR)
▌19. Henry Lee (F)

==== Non-voting members ====
Northwest Territory. William Henry Harrison, until May 14, 1800

▌William McMillan (F), from November 24, 1800

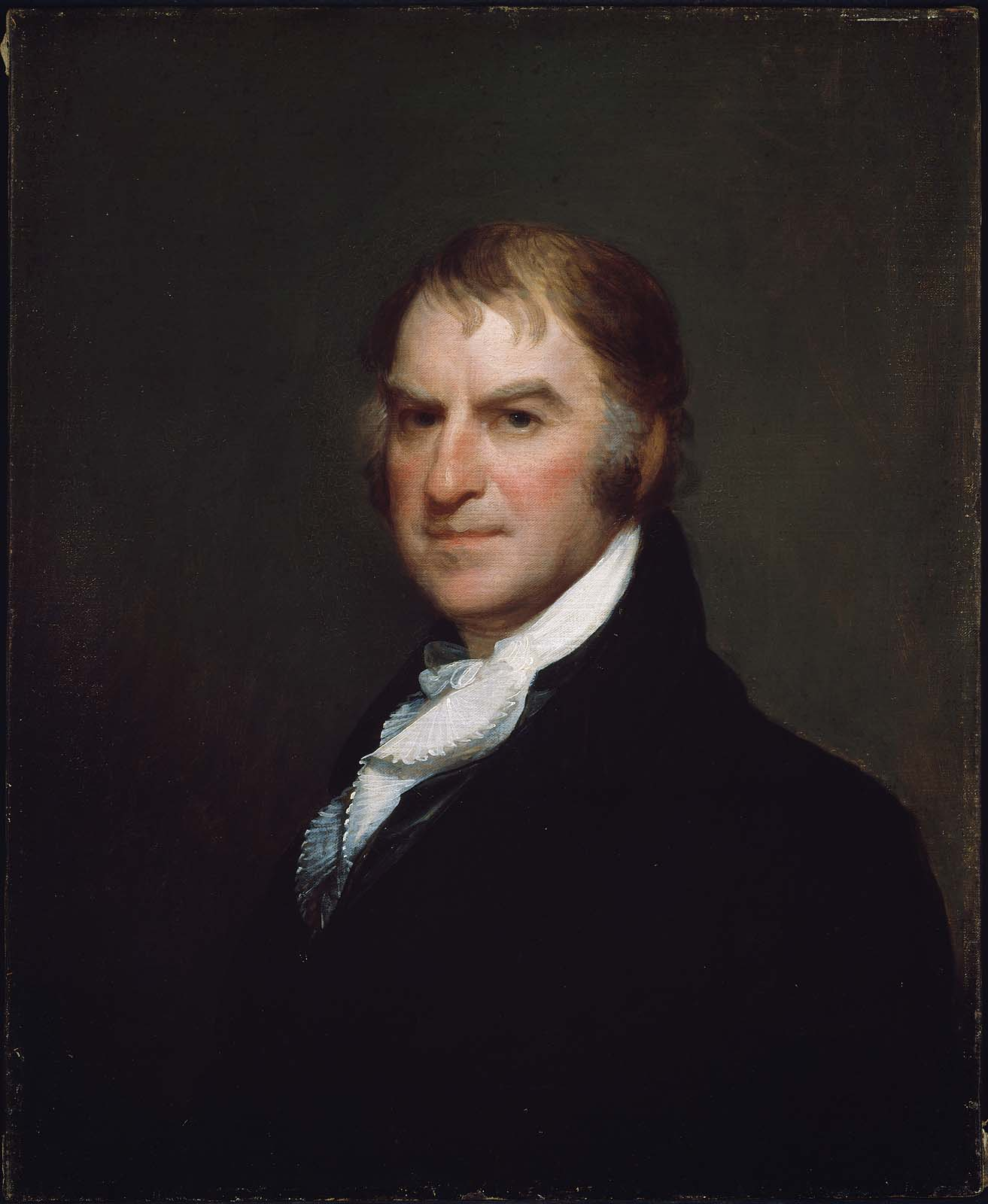
Speaker of the House Theodore Sedgwick

== Changes in membership ==
The count below reflects changes from the beginning of the first session of this Congress

=== Senate ===
There were 7 resignations and 1 vacancy at the beginning of Congress. The Federalists had a 1-seat net loss and the Democratic-Republicans had a 2-seat net gain.

Senate changes
State (class)	Vacated by	Reason for change	Successor	Date of successor's formal installation (Note: When seated or oath administered, not necessarily when service began.)
Virginia (2)	Vacant	Henry Tazewell (DR) died before the beginning of this Congress	Wilson C. Nicholas (DR)	Elected December 5, 1799
New York (1)	James Watson (F)	Resigned March 19, 1800	Gouverneur Morris (F)	Elected April 3, 1800
Massachusetts (2)	Samuel Dexter (F)	Resigned May 30, 1800	Dwight Foster (F)	Elected June 6, 1800
New York (3)	John Laurance (F)	Resigned sometime in August, 1800	John Armstrong (DR)	Elected November 6, 1800
Massachusetts (1)	Benjamin Goodhue (F)	Resigned November 8, 1800	Jonathan Mason (F)	Elected November 14, 1800
Maryland (3)	James Lloyd (F)	Resigned December 1, 1800	William Hindman (F)	Elected December 12, 1800
New Jersey (1)	James Schureman (F)	Resigned February 16, 1801	Aaron Ogden (F)	Elected February 28, 1801
Delaware (1)	Henry Latimer (F)	Resigned February 28, 1801	Samuel White (F)	Appointed February 28, 1801

=== House of Representatives ===
There were 6 resignations and 3 deaths. The Federalists had a 4-seat net loss and the Democratic-Republicans had a 3-seat net gain.

House changes
District	Vacated by	Reason for change	Successor	Date of successor's formal installation
New York; 1st	Jonathan Havens (DR)	Died October 25, 1799	John Smith (DR)	February 27, 1800
Northwest Territory at-large	William Henry Harrison	Resigned May 14, 1800, to become Territorial Governor of Indiana	William McMillan (F)	November 24, 1800
Connecticut at-large	Jonathan Brace (F)	Resigned sometime in 1800	John Cotton Smith (F)	November 17, 1800
Massachusetts; 10th	Samuel Sewall (F)	Resigned January 10, 1800, to become a justice of the Massachusetts Supreme Judicial Court	Nathan Read (F)	November 25, 1800
Massachusetts; 4th	Dwight Foster (F)	Resigned June 6, 1800, having been elected U.S. Senator	Levi Lincoln (DR)	December 15, 1800
Virginia; 13th	John Marshall (F)	Resigned June 7, 1800, to become Secretary of State	Littleton W. Tazewell (DR)	November 26, 1800
New Hampshire at-large	William Gordon (F)	Resigned June 12, 1800, to become New Hampshire Attorney General	Samuel Tenney (F)	December 8, 1800
Massachusetts; 3rd	Samuel Lyman (F)	Resigned November 6, 1800	Ebenezer Mattoon (F)	February 2, 1801
Pennsylvania; 8th	Thomas Hartley (F)	Died December 21, 1800	John Stewart (DR)	February 3, 1801
Georgia at-large	James Jones (F)	Died January 11, 1801	Vacant until next Congress	

== Committees ==
Lists of committees and their party leaders.

=== Senate ===
- Whole

=== House of Representatives ===
- Claims (Chairman: Dwight Foster then Nathaniel Macon)
- Commerce and Manufactures (Chairman: Samuel Smith)
- Elections (Chairman: Samuel W. Dana then George Dent)
- Revisal and Unfinished Business (Chairman: Roger Griswold then Jonas Platt)
- Rules (Select)
- Standards of Official Conduct
- Ways and Means (Chairman: Robert Goodloe Harper then Roger Griswold)
- Whole

=== Joint committees ===
- Enrolled Bills (Chairman: Dwight Foster)

== Administrative officers ==
- Architect of the Capitol: William Thornton

=== Senate ===
- Chaplain: William White, Episcopalian, until November 27, 1800
  - Thomas J. Claggett, Episcopalian, elected November 27, 1800
- Doorkeeper: James Mathers
- Secretary: Samuel Otis

=== House of Representatives ===
- Chaplain: Ashbel Green, Presbyterian, until November 27, 1800
  - Thomas Lyell, Methodist, elected November 27, 1800
- Clerk: Jonathan W. Condy, resigned December 4, 1800
  - John H. Oswald, elected December 9, 1800
- Doorkeeper: Thomas Claxton
- Sergeant at Arms: Joseph Wheaton

== See also ==
- 1798 United States elections (elections leading to this Congress)
  - 1798–99 United States Senate elections
  - 1798–99 United States House of Representatives elections
- 1800 United States elections (elections during this Congress, leading to the next Congress)
  - 1800 United States presidential election
  - 1800–01 United States Senate elections
  - 1800–01 United States House of Representatives elections
