= Daniel Newcomb =

American judge (1747–1818)

Daniel Newcomb (or Newcome; April 17, 1747 – July 14, 1818) was a New Hampshire politician and judge who served as a justice of the New Hampshire Supreme Court from 1796 to 1798.

Born in Norton, Massachusetts, to Jonathan and Elizabeth (Copeland) Newcomb, Newcomb graduated from Harvard College in 1768 and studied law in Boston to gain admission to the bar there in October 1778. He moved to Keene, New Hampshire, the same year to enter the practice of law.

In 1783 his practice was large and he "became a man of note and influence". In 1789 he was appointed solicitor of the county of Cheshire, and in 1790 a judge of the court of common pleas, from which he resigned October 2, 1793. He was a member of the convention to revise the constitution of the state in 1791 and 1792. In 1796 he was commissioned a justice of the Superior Court and served until his resignation in 1798. In 1795, 1800 and 1805 he was a member of the New Hampshire Senate.

He died at Keene at the age of 71.

Political offices
Preceded by Ebenezer Thompson	Justice of the New Hampshire Supreme Court; 1796–1798	Succeeded by Paine Wingate
