= Jedediah K. Smith =

American politician (1770–1828)

Member of the U.S. House of Representatives from New Hampshire's at-large district
- In office March 4, 1807 – March 3, 1809
- Preceded by: David Hough
- Succeeded by: Nathaniel Appleton Haven

Member of the New Hampshire Senate
- In office 1804–1806
- In office 1809

Member of the New Hampshire House of Representatives
- In office 1803

Personal details
- Born: Jedediah Kilburn Smith; November 7, 1770 Amherst, Province of New Hampshire
- Died: December 17, 1828 (aged 58) Amherst, New Hampshire, U.S.
- Party: Democratic-Republican
- Occupation: Politician, lawyer

Jedediah Kilburn Smith (November 7, 1770 – December 17, 1828) was a U.S. representative from New Hampshire.

Born in Amherst, New Hampshire, Smith completed preparatory studies, then studied law. He was admitted to the bar and commenced practice at Amherst in 1800. He served as member of the New Hampshire House of Representatives in 1803, and served as member of the New Hampshire Senate, 1804–1806 and 1809.

Smith was elected as a Democratic-Republican to the Tenth Congress (March 4, 1807 – March 3, 1809). He was an unsuccessful candidate for the United States Senate in 1810. He was a Councilor, 1810–1815, and was Postmaster at Amherst from May 19, 1819, until his successor was appointed on March 15, 1826. He served as associate justice of the court of common pleas, 1816–1821, and of the court of sessions, 1821-1823. He was chief justice of the court of sessions, 1823-1825.

He died in Amherst on December 17, 1828.

U.S. House of Representatives
Preceded by David Hough	Member of the U.S. House of Representatives from New Hampshire's at-large congressional district 1807-1809	Succeeded by Nathaniel A. Haven
