= David Hough (politician) =

American politician

Member of the U.S. House of Representatives from New Hampshire's at-large district (Seat 3)
- In office March 4, 1805 – March 3, 1807
- Preceded by: Samuel Tenney
- Succeeded by: Francis Gardner

Member of the U.S. House of Representatives from New Hampshire's at-large district (Seat 4)
- In office March 4, 1803 – March 3, 1805
- Preceded by: Abiel Foster
- Succeeded by: Samuel Tenney

Member of the New Hampshire House of Representatives
- In office 1788-1789; 1794

Personal details
- Born: March 13, 1753 Norwich, Connecticut Colony, British America
- Died: April 18, 1831 (aged 78) Lebanon, New Hampshire, U.S.
- Resting place: Cole Cemetery, Lebanon, New Hampshire
- Party: Federalist
- Spouse: Abigail Huntington
- Children: Lucinda Hough Ela; Philera Hough; Nancy Hough; Charlotte Hough; Nabba Hough; Lydia Hough; David Hough; John Hough; John Hough 2nd Lydia Hough 2nd
- Parent(s): David Hough; Desire Hough
- Profession: Carpenter; Farmer; Politician

David Hough (March 13, 1753 – April 18, 1831) was an American politician, a farmer, and a United States Representative from New Hampshire.

== Early life ==
Born in Norwich in the Connecticut Colony, Hough attended the common schools and worked for a while as a ship carpenter.

== Career ==
Hough moved to Lebanon, Grafton County, New Hampshire, in 1778, and served as member of the New Hampshire House of Representatives in 1788, 1789, and 1794. He was also a Justice of the Peace and a colonel of the militia. He served as delegate to the State constitutional convention in 1783 and was a commissioner of valuation in 1798.

Elected as a Federalist to the Eighth and Ninth Congresses, Hough served as United States Representative for the state of New Hampshire from (March 4, 1803 – March 3, 1807). Subsequently, he engaged in agricultural pursuits.

== Death ==
Hough died in Lebanon, New Hampshire, April 18, 1831 (aged 78 years). He is interred at Cole Cemetery, Lebanon, New Hampshire.

== Family life ==
Son of David and Desire, Hough married Abigail Huntington on July 2, 1775, and they had a daughter, Lucinda, who married Jacob Ela. They also had Philera, Nancy, Charlotte, Nabba, Lydia, David, John, John 2nd, and Lydia 2nd. David Hough is a descendant of William Brewster

U.S. House of Representatives
Preceded by Abiel Foster	Member of the U.S. House of Representatives from New Hampshire; 1803–1805	Succeeded by Samuel Tenney
Preceded by Samuel Tenney	Member of the U.S. House of Representatives from New Hampshire; 1805–1807	Succeeded by Francis Gardner
