= Tabitha Gilman Tenney =

American author

- Born: Tabitha Gilman; 1762
- Died: 1837 (aged 74–75)
- Citizenship: United States of America
- Occupation: Author
- Spouse: Samuel Tenney
- Children: 0
- Relatives: Nicholas Gilman, second cousin
- Writing career
- Language: English
- Genre: Early American fiction
- Notable works: Female Quixotism, Exhibited in the Romantic Opinions and Extravagant Adventures of Dorcasina Sheldon
- Movement: Anti-romance

Tabitha Gilman Tenney (1762–1837) was an American writer from Exeter, New Hampshire. She is most noted for her work, Female Quixotism, that was published in 1801.

== Early life ==
Tabitha was a teenager during the American Revolution. Exeter was the Revolutionary capitol of New Hampshire. She was the second cousin of Nicholas Gilman, NH State Treasurer during the American Revolution. Her uncle Peter Gilman was a Brigadier. Her parents were Samuel and Lydia.

== Career ==
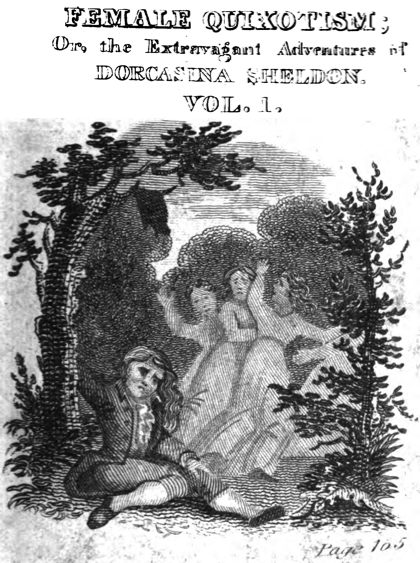
Illustration from Tenney's Female Quixotism (Boston: J.P. Peaslee, 1825)

Tenney's novel Female Quixotism, Exhibited in the Romantic Opinions and Extravagant Adventures of Dorcasina Sheldon, which followed Cervantes and Charlotte Lennox in attacking the delusions encouraged by romantic literature, was first published in two volumes in 1801.

=== Legacy ===
Literary historian F. L. Patee has described Female Quixotism (1801) as the most popular novel written in America prior to the publication of Uncle Tom's Cabin in 1852. Female Quixotism went through at least five editions and was still in print when Harriet Beecher Stowe wrote her landmark book.

A quote from page 23 of her book shows signs of an early feminist attitude: "Those enemies to female improvement thought a woman had no business with any book but the bible, or perhaps the art of cookery; believing that everything beyond these served only to disqualify her for the duties of domestic life."

== Personal life ==
In 1788, she married Samuel Tenney, a former army surgeon. They had no children. He was elected to Congress in 1788. He became a long-time judge in Exeter. Their house originally stood next door to the town hall and courthouse, but was moved, and currently stands at 65 High Street.

== See also ==
- Quixotism
