= James Farrington =

American politician

Member of the U.S. House of Representatives from New Hampshire's At-Large district
- In office March 4, 1837 – March 3, 1839
- Preceded by: Robert Burns
- Succeeded by: Edmund Burke

Member of the New Hampshire Senate
- In office 1836–1837

Member of the New Hampshire House of Representatives
- In office 1828–1831

Personal details
- Born: October 1, 1791 Conway, New Hampshire, U.S.
- Died: October 29, 1859 (aged 68) Rochester, New Hampshire, U.S.
- Resting place: Old Cemetery; Rochester, New Hampshire
- Party: Democratic Party
- Spouse: Mary D. Hansen Farrington
- Children: James Bonaparte Farrington; Mary Farrington; Joseph Farrington; Walter Farrington
- Education: Fryeburg Academy
- Profession: Physician; Banker; Politician

James Farrington (October 1, 1791 – October 29, 1859) was an American medical doctor, banker and politician from New Hampshire. He served as a member of the United States House of Representatives, the New Hampshire Senate and the New Hampshire House of Representatives in the early 1800s.

== Early life ==
Born in Conway, New Hampshire, Farrington was the son of Jeremiah and Molly (Swan) Farrington. He attended the common schools in Conway and graduated from Fryeburg Academy in 1814. He studied medicine and then began to practice medicine in Rochester, New Hampshire in 1818. He was a member of the New Hampshire Medical Society.

In 1834, Farrington and Nehemiah Eastman organized the Rochester Bank. Farrington served as president of the bank until his death.

== Political career ==
Farrington served as a member of the New Hampshire House of Representatives from 1828 to 1831, and as a member of the New Hampshire Senate in 1836. Elected as a Democrat to the Twenty-fifth Congress, he served as a United States representative for New Hampshire from March 4, 1837, to March 3, 1839.

After leaving Congress, Farrington was appointed one of the trustees of the New Hampshire Insane Asylum in 1845. He resumed the practice of medicine after 1845.

== Death ==
Farrington died in Rochester, Strafford County, New Hampshire on October 29, 1859. He is interred at Old Cemetery in Rochester.

== Personal life ==
He married Mary D. Hansen, daughter of Joseph and Charity Dame Hansen, on March 8, 1827. They had four children: James Bonaparte, Mary, Joseph, and Walter.

U.S. House of Representatives
Preceded by Robert Burns	Member of the U.S. House of Representatives from New Hampshire's at-large congressional district 1837–1839	Succeeded by Edmund Burke
