= New Hampshire's at-large congressional district =

1789–1847 US congressional district

Coordinates: 44°N 71.5°W

- Obsolete district
- Created: 1789
- Eliminated: 1847
- Years active: 1789–1847

The New Hampshire at-large congressional district is obsolete, with representation having since been divided into districts.

However, from 1789 to 1847, New Hampshire elected members to the United States House of Representatives at-large:

- From 1789 to 1793, three members represented the state at-large.
- From 1793 to 1803, four members represented the state at-large.
- From 1803 to 1813, five members represented the state at-large.
- From 1813 to 1833, six members represented the state at-large.
- From 1833 to 1843, five members represented the state at-large.
- From 1843 to 1847, four members represented the state at-large.
- In 1847 at-large representation was replaced by four congressional districts.

== List of members representing the district ==
Years & Congresses		Seat A			Seat B			Seat C			Seat D			Seat E			Seat F		
Years & Congresses		Rep.	Party	Electoral history	Rep.	Party	Electoral history	Rep.	Party	Electoral history	Rep.	Party	Electoral history	Rep.	Party	Electoral history	Rep.	Party	Electoral history
March 4, 1789 – June 22, 1789	1st	Representative-elect Benjamin West chose not to serve.			Nicholas Gilman (Exeter)	Pro-Admin	Elected in 1789. Re-elected in 1790. Re-elected in 1792. Re-elected in 1794. Retired.	Samuel Livermore (Holderness)	Anti-Admin	Elected in 1789. Re-elected in 1790. Retired.									
June 23, 1789 – March 3, 1791	1st	Abiel Foster (Canterbury)	Pro-Admin	Elected to finish West's term. Lost re-election.	Nicholas Gilman (Exeter)	Pro-Admin	Elected in 1789. Re-elected in 1790. Re-elected in 1792. Re-elected in 1794. Retired.	Samuel Livermore (Holderness)	Anti-Admin	Elected in 1789. Re-elected in 1790. Retired.									
March 4, 1791 – March 3, 1793	2nd	Jeremiah Smith (Peterborough)	Pro-Admin	Elected in 1790. Re-elected in 1792. Re-elected in 1794. Re-elected in 1796. Resigned.	Nicholas Gilman (Exeter)	Pro-Admin	Elected in 1789. Re-elected in 1790. Re-elected in 1792. Re-elected in 1794. Retired.	Samuel Livermore (Holderness)	Pro-Admin	Elected in 1789. Re-elected in 1790. Retired.									
March 4, 1793 – March 3, 1795	3rd	Jeremiah Smith (Peterborough)	Pro-Admin	Elected in 1790. Re-elected in 1792. Re-elected in 1794. Re-elected in 1796. Resigned.	Nicholas Gilman (Exeter)	Pro-Admin	Elected in 1789. Re-elected in 1790. Re-elected in 1792. Re-elected in 1794. Retired.	John Samuel Sherburne (Portsmouth)	Anti-Admin	Elected in 1792. Re-elected in 1794. Retired.	Paine Wingate (Hampton Falls)	Pro-Admin	Elected in 1792. Lost re-election.						
March 4, 1795 – March 3, 1797	4th	Jeremiah Smith (Peterborough)	Fed	Elected in 1790. Re-elected in 1792. Re-elected in 1794. Re-elected in 1796. Resigned.	Nicholas Gilman (Exeter)	Fed	Elected in 1789. Re-elected in 1790. Re-elected in 1792. Re-elected in 1794. Retired.	John Samuel Sherburne (Portsmouth)	Dem-Rep	Elected in 1792. Re-elected in 1794. Retired.	Abiel Foster (Canterbury)	Fed	Elected in 1794. Re-elected in 1796. Re-elected in 1798. Re-elected in 1800. Retired.						
March 4, 1797 – July 26, 1797	5th	Jeremiah Smith (Peterborough)	Fed	Elected in 1790. Re-elected in 1792. Re-elected in 1794. Re-elected in 1796. Resigned.	Jonathan Freeman (Hanover)	Fed	Elected in 1796. Re-elected in 1798. Retired.	William Gordon (Amherst)	Fed	Elected in 1796. Re-elected in 1798. Resigned to become New Hampshire Attorney General.	Abiel Foster (Canterbury)	Fed	Elected in 1794. Re-elected in 1796. Re-elected in 1798. Re-elected in 1800. Retired.						
July 26, 1797 – December 15, 1797	5th	Vacant			Jonathan Freeman (Hanover)	Fed	Elected in 1796. Re-elected in 1798. Retired.	William Gordon (Amherst)	Fed	Elected in 1796. Re-elected in 1798. Resigned to become New Hampshire Attorney General.	Abiel Foster (Canterbury)	Fed	Elected in 1794. Re-elected in 1796. Re-elected in 1798. Re-elected in 1800. Retired.						
December 15, 1797 – March 3, 1799	5th	Peleg Sprague (Keene)	Fed	Elected to finish Smith's term. Re-elected in 1798, but declined to serve.	Jonathan Freeman (Hanover)	Fed	Elected in 1796. Re-elected in 1798. Retired.	William Gordon (Amherst)	Fed	Elected in 1796. Re-elected in 1798. Resigned to become New Hampshire Attorney General.	Abiel Foster (Canterbury)	Fed	Elected in 1794. Re-elected in 1796. Re-elected in 1798. Re-elected in 1800. Retired.						
March 4, 1799 – June 12, 1800	6th	James Sheafe (Portsmouth)	Fed	Elected to finish Sprague's term. Retired.	Jonathan Freeman (Hanover)	Fed	Elected in 1796. Re-elected in 1798. Retired.	William Gordon (Amherst)	Fed	Elected in 1796. Re-elected in 1798. Resigned to become New Hampshire Attorney General.	Abiel Foster (Canterbury)	Fed	Elected in 1794. Re-elected in 1796. Re-elected in 1798. Re-elected in 1800. Retired.						
June 12, 1800 – December 8, 1800	6th	James Sheafe (Portsmouth)	Fed	Elected to finish Sprague's term. Retired.	Jonathan Freeman (Hanover)	Fed	Elected in 1796. Re-elected in 1798. Retired.	Vacant			Abiel Foster (Canterbury)	Fed	Elected in 1794. Re-elected in 1796. Re-elected in 1798. Re-elected in 1800. Retired.						
December 8, 1800 – March 3, 1801	6th	James Sheafe (Portsmouth)	Fed	Elected to finish Sprague's term. Retired.	Jonathan Freeman (Hanover)	Fed	Elected in 1796. Re-elected in 1798. Retired.	Samuel Tenney (Exeter)	Fed	Elected August 25, 1800 to the next term. Elected October 27, 1800 to finish Gordon's term. Re-elected in 1802. Re-elected in 1804. Lost re-election.	Abiel Foster (Canterbury)	Fed	Elected in 1794. Re-elected in 1796. Re-elected in 1798. Re-elected in 1800. Retired.						
March 4, 1801 – ?, 1802	7th	George B. Upham (Claremont)	Fed	Elected in 1800. Retired.	Joseph Peirce (Alton)	Fed	Elected in 1800. Resigned.	Samuel Tenney (Exeter)	Fed	Elected August 25, 1800 to the next term. Elected October 27, 1800 to finish Gordon's term. Re-elected in 1802. Re-elected in 1804. Lost re-election.	Abiel Foster (Canterbury)	Fed	Elected in 1794. Re-elected in 1796. Re-elected in 1798. Re-elected in 1800. Retired.						
?, 1802 – December 6, 1802	7th	George B. Upham (Claremont)	Fed	Elected in 1800. Retired.	Vacant			Samuel Tenney (Exeter)	Fed	Elected August 25, 1800 to the next term. Elected October 27, 1800 to finish Gordon's term. Re-elected in 1802. Re-elected in 1804. Lost re-election.	Abiel Foster (Canterbury)	Fed	Elected in 1794. Re-elected in 1796. Re-elected in 1798. Re-elected in 1800. Retired.						
December 6, 1802 – March 3, 1803	7th	George B. Upham (Claremont)	Fed	Elected in 1800. Retired.	Samuel Hunt (Keene)	Fed	Elected August 30, 1802 to finish Peirce's term. Elected August 30, 1802 to the next term. Retired.	Samuel Tenney (Exeter)	Fed	Elected August 25, 1800 to the next term. Elected October 27, 1800 to finish Gordon's term. Re-elected in 1802. Re-elected in 1804. Lost re-election.	Abiel Foster (Canterbury)	Fed	Elected in 1794. Re-elected in 1796. Re-elected in 1798. Re-elected in 1800. Retired.						
March 4, 1803 – March 3, 1805	8th	Silas Betton (Salem)	Fed	Elected in 1802. Re-elected in 1804. Lost re-election.	Samuel Hunt (Keene)	Fed	Elected August 30, 1802 to finish Peirce's term. Elected August 30, 1802 to the next term. Retired.	Samuel Tenney (Exeter)	Fed	Elected August 25, 1800 to the next term. Elected October 27, 1800 to finish Gordon's term. Re-elected in 1802. Re-elected in 1804. Lost re-election.	David Hough (Lebanon)	Fed	Elected in 1802. Re-elected in 1804. Lost re-election.	Clifton Clagett (Amherst)	Fed	Elected in 1802. Retired.			
March 4, 1805 – March 3, 1807	9th	Silas Betton (Salem)	Fed	Elected in 1802. Re-elected in 1804. Lost re-election.	Thomas W. Thompson (Concord)	Fed	Elected in 1804. Lost re-election.	Samuel Tenney (Exeter)	Fed	Elected August 25, 1800 to the next term. Elected October 27, 1800 to finish Gordon's term. Re-elected in 1802. Re-elected in 1804. Lost re-election.	David Hough (Lebanon)	Fed	Elected in 1802. Re-elected in 1804. Lost re-election.	Caleb Ellis (Claremont)	Fed	Elected in 1804. Lost re-election.			
March 4, 1807 – March 3, 1809	10th	Peter Carleton (Landaff)	Dem-Rep	Elected in 1806. Retired.	Daniel Meserve Durell (Dover)	Dem-Rep	Elected in 1806. Lost re-election.	Francis Gardner (Keene)	Dem-Rep	Elected in 1806. Lost re-election.	Jedediah K. Smith (Amherst)	Dem-Rep	Elected in 1806. Lost re-election.	Clement Storer (Portsmouth)	Dem-Rep	Elected in 1806. Lost re-election.			
March 4, 1809 – March 3, 1811	11th	Daniel Blaisdell (Canaan)	Fed	Elected in 1808. Lost re-election.	John Curtis Chamberlain (Charlestown)	Fed	Elected in 1808. Retired.	William Hale (Dover)	Fed	Elected in 1808. Lost re-election.	Nathaniel Appleton Haven(Portsmouth)	Fed	Elected in 1808. Retired.	James Wilson (Peterborough)	Fed	Elected in 1808. Lost re-election.			
March 4, 1811 – March 3, 1813	12th	Josiah Bartlett Jr. (Straham)	Dem-Rep	Elected in 1810. Retired.	Samuel Dinsmoor (Keene)	Dem-Rep	Elected in 1810. Lost re-election.	Obed Hall (Bartlett)	Dem-Rep	Elected in 1811. Retired.	John Adams Harper(Meredith Bridge)	Dem-Rep	Elected in 1811. Lost re-election.	George Sullivan (Exeter)	Fed	Elected in 1811. Retired.			
March 4, 1813 – May 21, 1814	13th	Bradbury Cilley (Nottingham)	Fed	Elected in 1812. Re-elected in 1814. Lost re-election.	Samuel Smith (Peterborough)	Fed	Elected in 1812. Resigned. (Note: Samuel Smith's resignation is not mentioned in the Congressional Biography.)	William Hale (Dover)	Fed	Elected in 1812. Re-elected in 1814. Lost re-election.	Roger Vose (Walpole)	Fed	Elected in 1812. Re-elected in 1814. Lost re-election.	Daniel Webster (Portsmouth)	Fed	Elected in 1812. Re-elected in 1814. Retired.	Jeduthun Wilcox (Orford)	Fed	Elected in 1812. Re-elected in 1814. Lost re-election.
May 21, 1814 – March 3, 1815	13th	Bradbury Cilley (Nottingham)	Fed	Elected in 1812. Re-elected in 1814. Lost re-election.	Vacant			William Hale (Dover)	Fed	Elected in 1812. Re-elected in 1814. Lost re-election.	Roger Vose (Walpole)	Fed	Elected in 1812. Re-elected in 1814. Lost re-election.	Daniel Webster (Portsmouth)	Fed	Elected in 1812. Re-elected in 1814. Retired.	Jeduthun Wilcox (Orford)	Fed	Elected in 1812. Re-elected in 1814. Lost re-election.
March 4, 1815 – March 3, 1817	14th	Bradbury Cilley (Nottingham)	Fed	Elected in 1812. Re-elected in 1814. Lost re-election.	Charles Humphrey Atherton (Amherst)	Fed	Elected in 1814. Retired.	William Hale (Dover)	Fed	Elected in 1812. Re-elected in 1814. Lost re-election.	Roger Vose (Walpole)	Fed	Elected in 1812. Re-elected in 1814. Lost re-election.	Daniel Webster (Portsmouth)	Fed	Elected in 1812. Re-elected in 1814. Retired.	Jeduthun Wilcox (Orford)	Fed	Elected in 1812. Re-elected in 1814. Lost re-election.
March 4, 1817 – March 3, 1819	15th	Josiah Butler (Deerfield)	Dem-Rep	Elected in 1816. Re-elected in 1819. Re-elected in 1820. Retired.	Nathaniel Upham (Rochester)	Dem-Rep	Elected in 1816. Re-elected in 1819. Re-elected in 1820. Retired.	Clifton Clagett (Amherst)	Dem-Rep	Elected in 1816. Re-elected in 1819. Lost re-election.	Salma Hale (Keene)	Dem-Rep	Elected in 1816. Retired.	Arthur Livermore (Plymouth)	Dem-Rep	Elected in 1816. Re-elected in 1819. Lost re-election.	John Parrott (Portsmouth)	Dem-Rep	Elected in 1816. Retired to run for U.S. senator.
March 4, 1819 – March 3, 1821	16th	Josiah Butler (Deerfield)	Dem-Rep	Elected in 1816. Re-elected in 1819. Re-elected in 1820. Retired.	Nathaniel Upham (Rochester)	Dem-Rep	Elected in 1816. Re-elected in 1819. Re-elected in 1820. Retired.	Clifton Clagett (Amherst)	Dem-Rep	Elected in 1816. Re-elected in 1819. Lost re-election.	Joseph Buffum Jr. (Westmoreland)	Dem-Rep	Elected in 1819. Retired.	Arthur Livermore (Plymouth)	Dem-Rep	Elected in 1816. Re-elected in 1819. Lost re-election.	William Plumer Jr. (Epping)	Dem-Rep (Note: Supported the Adams-Clay faction in the 1824 United States presidential election.)	Elected in 1819. Re-elected in 1820. Re-elected in 1822. Retired.
March 4, 1821 – March 3, 1823	17th	Josiah Butler (Deerfield)	Dem-Rep	Elected in 1816. Re-elected in 1819. Re-elected in 1820. Retired.	Nathaniel Upham (Rochester)	Dem-Rep	Elected in 1816. Re-elected in 1819. Re-elected in 1820. Retired.	Matthew Harvey (Hopkinton)	Dem-Rep	Elected in 1820. Re-elected in 1822. Retired.	Aaron Matson (Stoddard)	Dem-Rep	Elected in 1820. Re-elected in 1822. Retired.	Thomas Whipple Jr. (Wentworth)	Dem-Rep	Elected in 1820. Re-elected in 1822. Re-elected in 1824. Re-elected in 1827. Retired.	William Plumer Jr. (Epping)	Dem-Rep	Elected in 1819. Re-elected in 1820. Re-elected in 1822. Retired.
March 4, 1823 – March 3, 1825	18th	Ichabod Bartlett (Portsmouth)	Dem-Rep	Elected in 1822. Re-elected in 1824. Re-elected in 1827. Retired.	Arthur Livermore (Plymouth)	Dem-Rep	Elected on the second ballot in 1823. Lost re-election.	Matthew Harvey (Hopkinton)	Dem-Rep	Elected in 1820. Re-elected in 1822. Retired.	Aaron Matson (Stoddard)	Dem-Rep	Elected in 1820. Re-elected in 1822. Retired.	Thomas Whipple Jr. (Wentworth)	Dem-Rep	Elected in 1820. Re-elected in 1822. Re-elected in 1824. Re-elected in 1827. Retired.	William Plumer Jr. (Epping)	Dem-Rep	Elected in 1819. Re-elected in 1820. Re-elected in 1822. Retired.
March 4, 1825 – March 8, 1825	19th	Ichabod Bartlett (Portsmouth)	Anti-J	Elected in 1822. Re-elected in 1824. Re-elected in 1827. Retired.	James Miller was elected in 1824 but declined to serve.			Nehemiah Eastman (Farmington)	Anti-J	Elected in 1824. Lost re-election.	Jonathan Harvey (Sutton)	Jack	Elected in 1824. Re-elected in 1827. Re-elected in 1829. Retired.	Thomas Whipple Jr. (Wentworth)	Anti-J	Elected in 1820. Re-elected in 1822. Re-elected in 1824. Re-elected in 1827. Retired.	Late run-off election.		
March 8, 1825 – March 3, 1827	19th	Ichabod Bartlett (Portsmouth)	Anti-J	Elected in 1822. Re-elected in 1824. Re-elected in 1827. Retired.	Titus Brown (Francestown)	Anti-J	Elected March 8, 1825 to finish Miller's term. Re-elected in 1827. Retired.	Nehemiah Eastman (Farmington)	Anti-J	Elected in 1824. Lost re-election.	Jonathan Harvey (Sutton)	Jack	Elected in 1824. Re-elected in 1827. Re-elected in 1829. Retired.	Thomas Whipple Jr. (Wentworth)	Anti-J	Elected in 1820. Re-elected in 1822. Re-elected in 1824. Re-elected in 1827. Retired.	Joseph Healy (Washington)	Anti-J	Elected late on the second ballot in 1825. Re-elected in 1827. Retired.
March 4, 1827 – March 3, 1829	20th	Ichabod Bartlett (Portsmouth)	Anti-J	Elected in 1822. Re-elected in 1824. Re-elected in 1827. Retired.	Titus Brown (Francestown)	Anti-J	Elected March 8, 1825 to finish Miller's term. Re-elected in 1827. Retired.	David Barker Jr. (Rochester)	Anti-J	Elected in 1827. Lost re-election.	Jonathan Harvey (Sutton)	Jack	Elected in 1824. Re-elected in 1827. Re-elected in 1829. Retired.	Thomas Whipple Jr. (Wentworth)	Anti-J	Elected in 1820. Re-elected in 1822. Re-elected in 1824. Re-elected in 1827. Retired.	Joseph Healy (Washington)	Anti-J	Elected late on the second ballot in 1825. Re-elected in 1827. Retired.
March 4, 1829 – March 3, 1831	21st	John Brodhead (Newmarket)	Jack	Elected in 1829. Re-elected in 1831. Retired.	Thomas Chandler (Hillsborough)	Jack	Elected in 1829. Re-elected in 1831. Retired.	Joseph Hammons (Farmington)	Jack	Elected in 1829. Re-elected in 1831. Retired.	Jonathan Harvey (Sutton)	Jack	Elected in 1824. Re-elected in 1827. Re-elected in 1829. Retired.	Henry Hubbard (Charlestown)	Jack	Elected in 1829. Re-elected in 1831. Re-elected in 1833. Retired to run for U.S. senator.	John W. Weeks (Lancaster)	Jack	Elected in 1829. Re-elected in 1831. Retired.
March 4, 1831 – March 3, 1833	22nd	John Brodhead (Newmarket)	Jack	Elected in 1829. Re-elected in 1831. Retired.	Thomas Chandler (Hillsborough)	Jack	Elected in 1829. Re-elected in 1831. Retired.	Joseph Hammons (Farmington)	Jack	Elected in 1829. Re-elected in 1831. Retired.	Joseph M. Harper (Canterbury)	Jack	Elected in 1831. Re-elected in 1833. Retired.	Henry Hubbard (Charlestown)	Jack	Elected in 1829. Re-elected in 1831. Re-elected in 1833. Retired to run for U.S. senator.	John W. Weeks (Lancaster)	Jack	Elected in 1829. Re-elected in 1831. Retired.
March 4, 1833 – March 3, 1835	23rd	Benning M. Bean (Moultonborough)	Jack	Elected in 1833. Re-elected in 1835. Retired.	Robert Burns (Plymouth)	Jack	Elected in 1833. Re-elected in 1835. Retired.	Franklin Pierce (Hillsborough)	Jack	Elected in 1833. Re-elected in 1835. Retired to run for U.S. Senator.	Joseph M. Harper (Canterbury)	Jack	Elected in 1831. Re-elected in 1833. Retired.	Henry Hubbard (Charlestown)	Jack	Elected in 1829. Re-elected in 1831. Re-elected in 1833. Retired to run for U.S. senator.	Seat eliminated		
March 4, 1835 – March 3, 1837	24th	Benning M. Bean (Moultonborough)	Jack	Elected in 1833. Re-elected in 1835. Retired.	Robert Burns (Plymouth)	Jack	Elected in 1833. Re-elected in 1835. Retired.	Franklin Pierce (Hillsborough)	Jack	Elected in 1833. Re-elected in 1835. Retired to run for U.S. Senator.	Samuel Cushman (Portsmouth)	Jack	Elected in 1835. Re-elected in 1837. Retired.	Joseph Weeks (Richmond)	Jack	Elected in 1835. Re-elected in 1837. Retired.	Seat eliminated		
March 4, 1837 – March 3, 1839	25th	Charles G. Atherton (Nashua)	Dem	Elected in 1837. Re-elected in 1839. Re-elected in 1841. Retired to run for U.S. senator.	James Farrington (Rochester)	Dem	Elected in 1837. Retired.	Jared W. Williams (Lancaster)	Dem	Elected in 1837. Re-elected in 1839. Retired.	Samuel Cushman (Portsmouth)	Dem	Elected in 1835. Re-elected in 1837. Retired.	Joseph Weeks (Richmond)	Dem	Elected in 1835. Re-elected in 1837. Retired.	Seat eliminated		
March 4, 1839 – March 3, 1841	26th	Charles G. Atherton (Nashua)	Dem	Elected in 1837. Re-elected in 1839. Re-elected in 1841. Retired to run for U.S. senator.	Edmund Burke (Newport)	Dem	Elected in 1839. Re-elected in 1841. Re-elected in 1843. Retired.	Jared W. Williams (Lancaster)	Dem	Elected in 1837. Re-elected in 1839. Retired.	Ira Allen Eastman (Gilmanton)	Dem	Elected in 1839. Re-elected in 1841. Retired.	Tristram Shaw (Exeter)	Dem	Elected in 1839. Re-elected in 1841. Retired.	Seat eliminated		
March 4, 1841 – March 3, 1843	27th	Charles G. Atherton (Nashua)	Dem	Elected in 1837. Re-elected in 1839. Re-elected in 1841. Retired to run for U.S. senator.	Edmund Burke (Newport)	Dem	Elected in 1839. Re-elected in 1841. Re-elected in 1843. Retired.	John Randall Reding (Haverhill)	Dem	Elected in 1841. Re-elected in 1843. Retired.	Ira Allen Eastman (Gilmanton)	Dem	Elected in 1839. Re-elected in 1841. Retired.	Tristram Shaw (Exeter)	Dem	Elected in 1839. Re-elected in 1841. Retired.	Seat eliminated		
March 4, 1843 – March 3, 1845	28th	Moses Norris Jr. (Pittsfield)	Dem	Elected in 1843. Re-elected in 1845. Retired.	Edmund Burke (Newport)	Dem	Elected in 1839. Re-elected in 1841. Re-elected in 1843. Retired.	John Randall Reding (Haverhill)	Dem	Elected in 1841. Re-elected in 1843. Retired.	John P. Hale (Dover)	Dem	Elected in 1843. Lost re-election.	Seat eliminated.			Seat eliminated		
March 4, 1845 – March 3, 1847	29th	Moses Norris Jr. (Pittsfield)	Dem	Elected in 1843. Re-elected in 1845. Retired.	Mace Moulton (Manchester)	Dem	Elected in 1845. Redistricted to the 3rd district and lost re-election.	James Hutchins Johnson (Bath)	Dem	Elected in 1845. Redistricted to the 4th district.	Vacant. No candidate received a majority of votes.			Seat eliminated.			Seat eliminated		
Years & Cong ress		Rep.	Party	Electoral history	Rep.	Party	Electoral history	Rep.	Party	Electoral history	Rep.	Party	Electoral history	Rep.	Party	Electoral history	Rep.	Party	Electoral history
Years & Cong ress		Seat A			Seat B			Seat C			Seat D			Seat E			Seat F		
