= Joseph Buffum Jr. =

American politician (1784–1874)

Member of the U.S. House of Representatives from New Hampshire's 4th district
- In office March 4, 1819 – March 3, 1821
- Preceded by: Clement Storer
- Succeeded by: Josiah Butler

Personal details
- Born: September 23, 1784 Fitchburg, Worcester County; Massachusetts, USA
- Died: February 24, 1874 (aged 89) Westmoreland, Cheshire County; New Hampshire, USA
- Resting place: South Village Cemetery; Westmoreland, Cheshire County; New Hampshire, USA
- Party: Democratic-Republican
- Education: Dartmouth College
- Profession: Lawyer; Politician; Farmer

Joseph Buffum Jr. (September 23, 1784 – February 24, 1874) was an American politician and a U.S. Representative from New Hampshire.

== Early life ==
Born in Fitchburg, Worcester County, Massachusetts, Buffum attended the public schools and the local academy. He graduated from Dartmouth College in 1806, and studied law.

== Career ==
Buffum practiced in Westmoreland and Keene, New Hampshire.

Elected as a Democratic-Republican to the Sixteenth Congress, Buffum was United States Representative for the fourth district of New Hampshire from (March 4, 1819 – March 3, 1821). After leaving the House, he was appointed judge of the court of common pleas on January 21, 1825.

== Death ==
Buffum never married; engaged in agricultural pursuits and died in Westmoreland, Cheshire County, New Hampshire on February 24, 1874. He is interred in South Village Cemetery.

U.S. House of Representatives
Preceded by Clement Storer	Member of the U.S. House of Representatives from New Hampshire's 4th congressional district 1819-1821	Succeeded by Josiah Butler
