= Thomas Chandler (New Hampshire politician) =

American politician

Member of the U.S. House of Representatives from New Hampshire's at-large district
- In office March 4, 1829 – March 4, 1833
- Preceded by: Ichabod Bartlett
- Succeeded by: Robert Burns

Member of the New Hampshire Senate
- In office 1817-1819; 1825-1828

Member of the New Hampshire House of Representatives
- In office 1828

Personal details
- Born: August 10, 1772 Bedford, Province of New Hampshire, British America
- Died: January 28, 1866 (aged 93) Bedford, New Hampshire, U.S.
- Resting place: Bedford Cemetery; Bedford, Hillsborough County; New Hampshire
- Party: Jacksonian
- Spouse: Susanna McAfee Chandler
- Children: Asenath Chandler Kendrick; Sally Chandler Kendrick; Hannah Chandler Kendrick; Adam Chandler
- Profession: farmer innkeeper politician

Thomas Chandler (August 10, 1772 – January 28, 1866), was an American politician, farmer, and innkeeper who served as United States Representative for New Hampshire.

== Early life ==
Chandler was born on August 10, 1772, in Bedford in the Province of New Hampshire where he attended the public schools, then became a farmer and an innkeeper.

== Career ==
Justice of the peace in 1808 and captain of militia in 1815, Chandler was elected in 1816 as a member of the New Hampshire Senate from the 3rd district, serving from 1817 to 1819. He was again elected to the state senate in 1824, serving from 1825 to 1828. In 1828, he served in the New Hampshire House of Representatives.

Elected as a Jacksonian Democrat to the Twenty-first and Twenty-second Congresses, Chandler served from March 4, 1829, to March 3, 1833, as United States Representative for the state of New Hampshire.

== Death ==
Chandler died in Bedford, Hillsborough County, New Hampshire, on January 28, 1866 (age 93 years, 171 days). He is interred at Bedford Cemetery, Bedford, New Hampshire.

== Family life ==
Son of Zachariah and Sarah, Chandler was the uncle of Zachariah Chandler. He married Susanna McAfee and they had three daughters, Asenath, Sally, Hannah, and a son, Adam.

U.S. House of Representatives
Preceded by Ichabod Bartlett	Member of the U.S. House of Representatives from New Hampshire; 1829-1833	Succeeded by Robert Burns
