= Paine Wingate =

American judge (1739–1838)

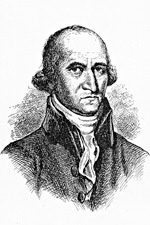

United States Senator from New Hampshire
- In office March 4, 1789 – March 3, 1793
- Preceded by: Position Established
- Succeeded by: Samuel Livermore

Member of the U.S. House of Representatives from New Hampshire's at-large district (Seat 4)
- In office March 4, 1793 – March 3, 1795
- Preceded by: Position Established
- Succeeded by: Abiel Foster

Personal details
- Born: May 14, 1739 Amesbury, Province of Massachusetts Bay
- Died: March 7, 1838 (aged 98) Stratham, New Hampshire
- Resting place: Stratham Cemetery
- Party: Federalist
- Education: Harvard University

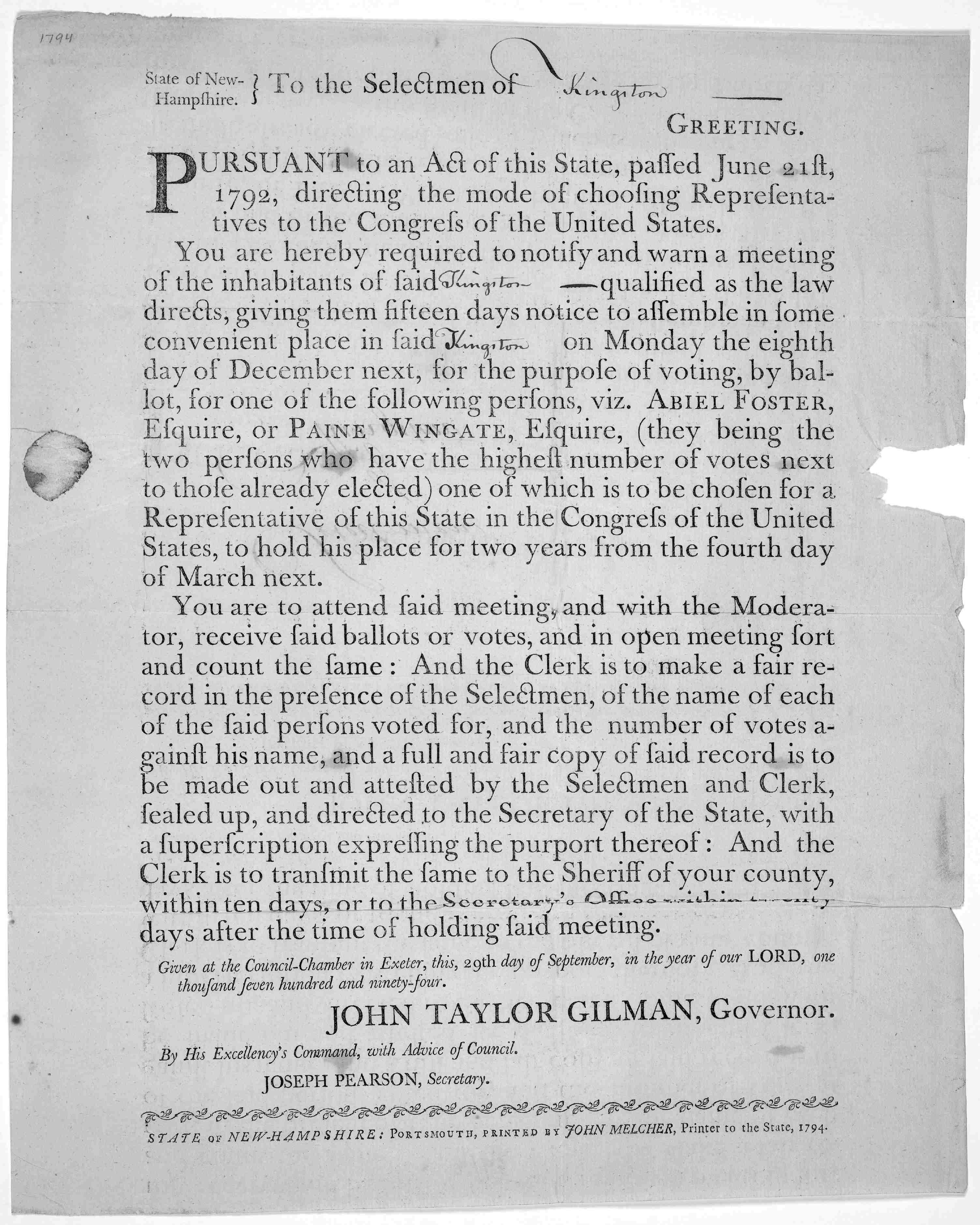
Order by Governor John Taylor Gilman for meeting to vote for member of Congress. Paine Wingate and Abiel Foster candidates

Paine Wingate (May 14, 1739 – March 7, 1838) was an American preacher, farmer, and statesman from Stratham, New Hampshire. He served New Hampshire in the Continental Congress and both the United States Senate and House of Representatives.

== Early life, education, ministry, and farming ==
Wingate was born the sixth of twelve children, in Amesbury, Province of Massachusetts Bay, in 1739. His father (also Paine) was a minister there. He graduated from Harvard College in 1759.

Wingate was ordained a minister of the Congregational Church in 1763. He became a pastor in Hampton Falls, New Hampshire. In 1776, Wingate gave up his ministry and moved to Stratham, where he took up farming.

== Political career ==
Wingate was elected to several terms in the New Hampshire House of Representatives, and was a delegate to their state constitutional convention in 1781.

In 1788, he served as a delegate to the Continental Congress. Despite his own background as a preacher, Wingate successfully proposed that the salaries for the two chaplains of the Continental Congress be cut by 25% probably due at least partly to the Confederation's untenable financial problems. Wingate was a strong advocate for ratification of the United States Constitution, writing as follows in March 1788:

[T]hose who are well-wishers to their country, and best know the situation we are in, are most sensible of the necessity of its adoption, and great pains are taken to obtain the end.

New Hampshire appointed him to the first United States Senate, in which he served from 4 March 1789 until 3 March 1793. He was then elected to the United States House of Representatives, where he served from 4 March 1793 to 3 March 1795.

Between 1789 and 1794, the U.S. Senate's deliberations were conducted in secret, which Wingate supported: "How would all the little domestic transactions of even the best regulated family appear if exposed to the world; and may not this apply to a larger body?" He believed that secrecy promoted respect for the Senate: "to be a little more out of view would conduce to its respectability in the opinion of the country."

While in the Senate, Wingate served on the committee that drafted the Judiciary Act of 1789, which set up the federal court system. He was disappointed that the bill "will not extend to a tenth part of the causes which might by the Constitution have come into the federal court". The remaining nine-tenths of cases arising under the Constitution and laws of the United States were left for the state courts to decide. Wingate voted against the bill, but it passed.

== Judicial career, retirement, and longevity ==
After his national service, Wingate succeeded Daniel Newcomb as an associate justice of the New Hampshire Supreme Court, serving from 1798 to 1808. Once he made up his mind, a change of mind was unlikely. According to Theophilus Parsons, "it was of great importance, that your Judge Wingate should form a correct opinion before he pronounces it—for after that, law, reason, and authority will be unavailing."

With the death of James Madison in 1836, Wingate drew some attention for surviving so long. Before he died at age 98 in 1838, Wingate was one of two surviving delegates to the Continental Congress (along with John Armstrong Jr.), and the last surviving member of the first United States Congress. For several years he had been the oldest graduate of Harvard. Wingate's wife, Eunice, was the sister of United States Secretary of State Timothy Pickering, and she died in 1843, having passed the century mark. The Wingates are buried in the Stratham Cemetery.

== Footnotes ==
U.S. House of Representatives
Preceded by Seat established	Member of the House of Representatives from New Hampshire's at-large (Seat 4) congressional district 1793–1795	Succeeded by Abiel Foster
U.S. Senate
Preceded by None	U.S. senator (Class 2) from New Hampshire; 1789–1793; Served alongside: John Langdon	Succeeded by Samuel Livermore
Honorary titles
Preceded by tied with 1st Senate	Most senior living U.S. senator (Sitting or former); November 14, 1832 – March 7, 1838	Succeeded by John Rutherfurd
Preceded by Charles Carroll	Oldest living U.S. senator November 14, 1832 – March 7, 1838	Succeeded by Samuel Smith
