= Joseph Weeks =

American politician (1773–1845)

Joseph Weeks (February 13, 1773 – August 4, 1845) was a United States representative from New Hampshire. He was the grandfather of Joseph Weeks Babcock who represented Wisconsin in the United States Congress from 1893 to 1907. He was born in Warwick, Massachusetts, where he attended the common schools. Later, he moved to Richmond, New Hampshire, where he engaged in agricultural pursuits.

Weeks served as the town clerk of Richmond, New Hampshire 1802–1822. He also served as a member of the New Hampshire House of Representatives 1807–1809, 1812, 1813, 1821–1826, 1830, and 1832–1834 and as an associate judge of the court of common pleas 1823 and 1827. He was elected as a Jacksonian to the Twenty-fourth Congress and reelected as a Democrat to the Twenty-fifth Congress (March 4, 1835 – March 3, 1839). He died in Winchester, New Hampshire in 1845.

U.S. House of Representatives
Preceded by Henry Hubbard	Member of the U.S. House of Representatives from New Hampshire's at-large congressional district 1835–1839	Succeeded by Tristram Shaw
