= 1799 New Hampshire's at-large congressional district special election =

A special election was held in New Hampshire's at-large congressional district on November 18, 1799, to replace a vacancy caused by Peleg Sprague (F) declining to serve in the 6th Congress.

== Election result ==
Candidate	Party	Votes	Percent
James Sheafe	Federalist	3,605	69.3%
Woodbury Langdon	Democratic-Republican	723	13.9%
Jeremiah Mason	Federalist	131	2.5%
John Prentice	Federalist	105	2.0%
Others		641	12.3%

Sheafe took his seat with the rest of the 6th Congress when the 1st session began on December 2, 1799

== See also ==
- List of special elections to the United States House of Representatives
