= 1825 New Hampshire's at-large congressional district special election =

A special election was held in New Hampshire's at-large congressional district on March 8, 1825, to fill a vacancy caused by Representative-elect James Miller declining to serve. The special election was held at the same time as the run-off election held to fill the 6th seat in New Hampshire's delegation.

== Election results ==
Candidate	Party	Votes	Percent
Titus Brown	Anti-Jacksonian	18,258	100%

== See also ==
- List of special elections to the United States House of Representatives
