= 1802 New Hampshire's at-large congressional district special election =

A special election was held in New Hampshire's at-large congressional district on August 30, 1802, to fill a vacancy left by the resignation of Joseph Peirce (F) earlier that year.

== Election results ==
Candidate	Party	Votes	Percent
Samuel Hunt	Federalist	5,322	55.8%
Nahum Parker	Democratic-Republican	3,912	41.1%
Others		297	3.1%

Hunt took office on December 6, 1802

== See also ==
- List of special elections to the United States House of Representatives
