= Abiel Foster =

American clergyman and politician (1735–1806)

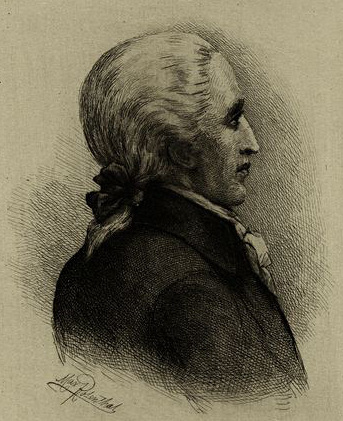
- Etching of Abiel Foster by Max Rosenthal

Member of the U.S. House of Representatives from New Hampshire's at-large district
- In office December 7, 1795 – March 3, 1803
- Preceded by: Paine Wingate
- Succeeded by: David Hough
- In office June 23, 1789 – March 3, 1791
- Preceded by: Seat vacant
- Succeeded by: Jeremiah Smith

Member of the Congress of the Confederation from New Hampshire
- In office July 29, 1783 – November 6, 1785

President of the New Hampshire Senate
- In office June 9, 1794 – January 16, 1795

Member of the New Hampshire Senate
- In office June 7, 1791 – January 16, 1795

Judge of the Court of Common Pleas from Rockingham County
- In office 1784–1788

Personal details
- Born: August 8, 1735 Andover, Province of Massachusetts Bay
- Died: February 6, 1806 (aged 70) Canterbury, New Hampshire, U.S.
- Party: Federalist
- Spouse(s): Hannah Badger Foster; Mary Wise Rogers Foster
- Children: 8
- Education: Harvard University
- Profession: Pastor; politician

Abiel Foster (August 8, 1735 – February 6, 1806) was an American clergyman and politician from Canterbury, Province of New Hampshire. He represented New Hampshire in the Continental Congress and the U.S. Congress. He was the first person in United States history elected to Congress in a special election.

== Biography ==
Foster was born in Andover, Massachusetts, in 1735, the son of Captain Asa Foster of Colonel Ebenezer Colonial Regiment and Elizabeth Abbot. A relative of Jedediah Foster, a judge, American Revolutionary and Harvard Law graduate (1744), the first member of the Foster family in America to receive a "liberal education". Abiel Foster was inspired to follow in the footsteps of Jedediah and entered Harvard College, receiving a bachelor's degree in 1756. After studying in theology, he was ordained as a pastor in Canterbury, January 26, 1761, he married Hanna Badger in that year. He served as pastor in Canterbury until 1779. At that time Abiel Foster retired to private life but would not be long before he returned to public service. During his 18 years as Minister of Canterbury he built trust with the people and he was appointed to the General Court. During his life, Abiel Foster held "various offices of trust and honour with reputation to himself and usefulness to the community.

Abiel Foster served in Congress under first President of the United States George Washington and 2nd President John Adams, while working with the Founding Fathers of the United States, to help build a functioning federal government.

While a member of the Continental Congress, Abiel Foster left an impression on a young Daniel Webster, after a meeting one summer afternoon. Webster's father, Ebenezer Webster told his son that he could have had Abiel Foster's place in the Congress if he had more votes. Ebenezer extolled the virtues of an education to his son, explaining that it was an education that made the difference between him and Foster. He said that "It is education that has made Foster what he is and the lack of it has made your father what he is".

Abiel Foster's first wife Hanna died in 1768. His second wife, Mary Wise Rogers, was the granddaughter of John Rogers (Harvard); they had eight children. Martha, who married Jeremiah Clough, Mary who married Henry Gerrish, Abiel Jr. who married Susanna Moore, Elizabeth who married Enoch Gerrish and Nancy who married John Greenough.

== Career ==
In 1775, Foster was Deputy to the Provincial Congress at Exeter. From 1783 to 1785, Foster was a delegate for New Hampshire to the Continental Congress. Between 1784 and 1788, he was a Judge of the Court of Common Pleas in Rockingham County N.H. On March 3, 1789, he became a member of the First United States Congress, under the first Constitution of the United States of America, as a Representative from New Hampshire until March 3, 1791. He returned to the New Hampshire Senate in 1791 and served there until 1794. He unsuccessfully ran for the U.S. House of Representatives in 1792, but was successfully elected again in 1794, serving there from December 7, 1795, to March 3, 1803.

On July 14, 1798, Foster voted in favor of the Alien and Sedition Acts.

== Death ==
Foster died in Canterbury on February 6, 1806. He is interred at the Center Cemetery, Canterbury, New Hampshire.

== Memorial ==
March 22, 1942, the California Shipbuilding Company launches its 16th Liberty type, 10,500-ton freighter, S.S. Abiel Foster. The day before, the S.S. Benjamin Franklin, launched November 16, 1941, completed its test run. The S.S. Abiel Foster took part as a troop supply ship during World War II and contributed to the Invasion of Normandy.

U.S. House of Representatives
Preceded by (none)	Member of the U.S. House of Representatives from New Hampshire's at-large congressional district June 23, 1789 – March 3, 1791	Succeeded by Jeremiah Smith
Preceded by Paine Wingate	Member of the U.S. House of Representatives from New Hampshire's at-large congressional district March 4, 1795 – March 3, 1803	Succeeded by David Hough
