= William Gordon (New Hampshire politician) =

American politician

Member of the U.S. House of Representatives from New Hampshire's at-large district
- In office March 4, 1797 – June 12, 1800
- Preceded by: Nicholas Gilman
- Succeeded by: Samuel Tenney

New Hampshire Attorney General
- In office June 12, 1800 – May 8, 1802 (death)

New Hampshire State Senator
- In office 1794–1795

Personal details
- Born: April 12, 1763 near Boston, Province of Massachusetts Bay, British America
- Died: May 8, 1802 (aged 39) Boston, Massachusetts, U.S.
- Resting place: Amherst Town Hall Burying Ground; Amherst, Hillsborough County; New Hampshire, U.S.
- Party: Federalist
- Spouse: Mary Frances Atherton Gordon
- Children: William Gordon
- Education: Harvard University
- Profession: Lawyer; Politician

William Gordon (April 12, 1763 – May 8, 1802) was an American politician and a United States representative from the state of New Hampshire.

== Early life ==
Born near Boston in the Province of Massachusetts Bay, Gordon graduated from Harvard College in 1779, studied law with Joshua Atherton, admitted to the bar in 1787 and commenced practice in Amherst, New Hampshire.

== Career ==
Gordon was appointed register of probate in 1793 and was a member of the New Hampshire Senate for the seventh district in 1794 and 1795. He was also solicitor of Hillsborough County from 1794 to 1801.

Elected as a Federalist to the Fifth and Sixth Congresses, Gordon served as a United States representative of the state of New Hampshire from March 4, 1797, until June 12, 1800. He was one of the impeachment managers appointed by the House of Representatives in 1798 to conduct the impeachment proceedings against William Blount, a United States Senator from Tennessee. He resigned to accept the office of New Hampshire Attorney General, which he held until his death.

== Death ==
Gordon died in Boston on May 8, 1802 (age 39 years, 26 days). He was interred at Amherst Town Hall Burying Ground, Amherst, Hillsborough County, New Hampshire.

== Family life ==
Gordon is one of many New Hampshire notables who descends from New Hampshire Pioneer Alexander Gordon. He married Mary Frances Atherton, daughter of Joshua Atherton, and they had one son, William.

U.S. House of Representatives
Preceded by Nicholas Gilman	Member of the U.S. House of Representatives from New Hampshire's at-large congressional district 1797-1800	Succeeded by Samuel Tenney
