= Tristram Shaw =

American politician

Tristram Shaw (May 23, 1786 – March 14, 1843) was a United States representative from New Hampshire. He was born in Hampton, New Hampshire in 1786. He completed preparatory studies there.

Shaw held several local offices in Exeter, New Hampshire before he was elected as a Democrat to the Twenty-sixth and Twenty-seventh Congresses (March 4, 1839 – March 3, 1843). He died in Exeter in 1843, shortly after leaving Congress, and was buried in Bride Hill Cemetery in Hampton.

U.S. House of Representatives
Preceded by Joseph Weeks	Member of the U.S. House of Representatives from New Hampshire's at-large congressional district 1839–1843	Succeeded by Seat inactive
