= Francis Gardner =

American politician (1771–1835)

Frank Gardner

Member of the U.S. House of Representatives from New Hampshire's at-large district
- In office March 4, 1807 – March 3, 1809
- Preceded by: Samuel Tenney
- Succeeded by: William Hale

Personal details
- Born: December 27, 1771 Leominster, Worcester County, Massachusetts, British America
- Died: June 25, 1835 (aged 63) Roxbury, Suffolk County; Massachusetts, USA
- Party: Democratic-Republican
- Spouse: Margaret Leonard Gardner
- Children: 5
- Education: Harvard University
- Profession: Lawyer; Politician

Francis Gardner (December 27, 1771 – June 25, 1835) was an American politician and a United States representative from New Hampshire.

== Early life ==
Gardner was born in Leominster, Massachusetts, Worcester County, Massachusetts, and graduated from Harvard University in 1793. He then studied law, was admitted to the bar in 1796 and commenced practice at Walpole, New Hampshire before moving to Keene in 1806.

== Career ==
Elected as a Democratic-Republican to the Tenth Congress, Gardner served as United States Representative for the state of New Hampshire from (March 4, 1807 – March 3, 1809). He was not a candidate for reelection in 1808 and resumed his practice as well as serving as solicitor of Cheshire County.

Gardner was appointed solicitor of Cheshire County, New Hampshire on June 30, 1806, and served from 1807 to 1820.

== Death ==
Gardner died in Roxbury (now part of Boston), Suffolk County, Massachusetts on June 25, 1835 (age 63 years, 180 days). His burial location is unknown.

== Family life ==
Gardner was the son of the Rev. Francis Gardner (1736–1814), he married Margaret Leonard on Nov 1, 1804, and they had five children, Susan, Francis, Margaret Helen, Delia Leonard, and Sarah Gibson. His sister Hannah was the wife of Congressman Abijah Bigelow, who served in the U.S. House of Representatives from 1810 to 1815.

U.S. House of Representatives
| Preceded by Samuel Tenney | Member of the U.S. House of Representatives from New Hampshire; 1807-1809 | Succeeded by William Hale |
