= New Hampshire's 4th congressional district =

Former U.S. House district in New Hampshire

- Obsolete district
- Created: 1847
- Eliminated: 1853
- Years active: 1847-1853

New Hampshire's 4th congressional district is an obsolete district. This short-lived district was organized in 1847. It was eliminated after the 1850 census. The last member serving the district was Harry Hibbard.

== List of members representing the district ==
Member (Residence)	Party	Years	Cong ress	Electoral history
District established March 4, 1847
James Hutchins Johnson (Bath)	Democratic	March 4, 1847 – March 3, 1849	30th	Redistricted from the at-large district and re-elected in 1847. Retired.
Harry Hibbard (Bath)	Democratic	March 4, 1849 – March 3, 1853	31st 32nd	Elected in 1849. Re-elected in 1851. Redistricted to the 3rd district.
District dissolved March 3, 1853
