= Samuel Tenney =

American politician

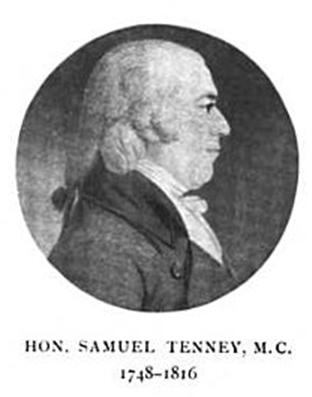

Member of the U.S. House of Representatives from New Hampshire's at-large district
- In office December 8, 1800 – March 3, 1807
- Preceded by: William Gordon
- Succeeded by: Francis Gardner

Personal details
- Born: November 27, 1748 Byfield, Province of Massachusetts Bay, British America
- Died: February 6, 1816 (aged 67) Exeter, New Hampshire, U.S.
- Party: Federalist
- Spouse: Tabitha Gilman Tenney (1788–1816)
- Education: Harvard College
- Occupation: physician, scholar, scientist, judge, politician, statesman

Samuel Tenney (November 27, 1748 – February 6, 1816) was a United States representative from New Hampshire. Born in Byfield in the Province of Massachusetts Bay, he attended Governor Dummer Academy and graduated from Harvard College in 1772. He taught school at Andover and studied medicine, beginning practice in Exeter, New Hampshire. He was a surgeon in the Revolutionary War. He tended the wounded patriots following the Battle of Bunker Hill then for the next year served as Surgeon's Mate alongside Massachusetts troops. For the balance of the war he was a surgeon attached primarily to the 1st Rhode Island Regiment. He was present at the surrenders of Burgoyne and Cornwallis; encamped at Valley Forge, Pennsylvania, during that fierce Winter 1777/78; was designated Acting Surgeon General of the Army upon general orders of General George Washington; and then returned to Exeter at the close of the war where he took up politics and other scholarly pursuits. He was a delegate to the State constitutional convention in 1788 and a judge of probate for Rockingham County from 1793 to 1800. He was secretary of the New Hampshire Medical Society and commissioned Paul Revere to produce the first engraving of that organization's seal. Used the pseudonym "Alfredus" to publish commentary as part of public debate over the design and ratification of the U.S. Constitution. He was elected a Fellow of the American Academy of Arts and Sciences in 1791, and was elected a member of the American Antiquarian Society in 1815.

Circa 1800 he commissioned a home which was built in the center of Exeter on Front Street next to the First Church, now part of the Front Street Historic District. It would be his primary residence in New Hampshire. In 1893, long after Samuel's death, the home was relocated to 65 High Street to make way for construction of a new County Courthouse. On November 25, 1980, the Samuel Tenney House was placed on the National Register of Historic Places listings in Rockingham County, New Hampshire.

Tenney was elected as a Federalist to the 6th U.S. Congress to fill the vacancy caused by the resignation of William Gordon; he was reelected to the 7th, 8th, and 9th Congresses and served from December 8, 1800, to March 3, 1807. While in the House, he was chairman of the Committee on Revisal and Unfinished Business (Eighth and Ninth Congresses). Upon retiring from Congress, he continued to pursue literary, historical, and scientific studies and died in Exeter in 1816.

In 1788, Tenney married Tabitha Gilman (1762–1837). Tabitha, born in Exeter, was descended from one of New England's mainline families. Tabitha's father Samuel Gilman died in 1778 and it is believed she stayed at home helping to raise her six younger siblings. Tabitha Gilman Tenney is a notable author in early American literature. In 1801, while living with Samuel in Washington D.C., Tabitha wrote and published her most recognized work, Female Quixotism: Exhibited in the Romantic Opinions and Extravagant Adventure of Dorcasina Sheldon. Samuel and Tabitha Tenney had no children.

== Sources ==
- United States Congress. "Samuel Tenney (id: T000127)". Biographical Directory of the United States Congress.. accessed 2010.07.08
- Tenney, Jonathan and Tenney, M.J. The Tenney family, or, The Descendants of Thomas Tenney of Rowley, Massachusetts, Pages 86–87. Rumford Press, 1904. accessed 2010.07.10
- Bell, Charles Henry. History of the town of Exeter, New Hampshire, Pages 382 & 383. Press of J. E. Farwell & Co., Boston, 1888. accessed 2010.07.07
- Ewell, John Louis. The story of Byfield: a New England Parish. G.E. Littlefield, 1904. accessed 2010.07.10

U.S. House of Representatives
Preceded by William Gordon	Member of the U.S. House of Representatives from New Hampshire's at-large congressional district 1800-1807	Succeeded by Francis Gardner
