= Alfred Bennison Atherton =

Canadian physician

Alfred Bennison Atherton (January 22, 1843 – March 7, 1921) was a Canadian surgeon, gynaecologist, obstetrician and educator who made historical contributions to the pathology and surgery of hernia.

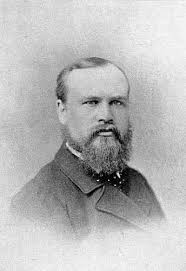
Alfred Bennison Atherton

== Early life ==
Atherton was born in Queensbury Parish, New Brunswick, the son of John Atherton (1800-1881) and Charlotte Bennison (1811-1900).

His early education was received at public schools. He chose medicine and pursued his studies under the direction of Hiram Dow of Fredericton. He graduated with a B.A. from the University of New Brunswick in 1862, and subsequently studied in the United States, where he earned his MD from Harvard Medical School, graduating in 1866.

He travelled to the United Kingdom for further studies Royal College of Physicians of Edinburgh in Edinburgh. He received a diploma of the Royal College of Surgeons of Edinburgh in May 1867, also visiting hospitals in London.

He returned to Canada and became a member of the senate of the University of New Brunswick from 1867 to 1884, and a member of the Medical Council of New Brunswick from 1881 to 1884.

== Career ==
Atherton was a medical practitioner in Canada and the United States, initially at Victoria Cottage Hospital in Fredericton, New Brunswick, followed by Ontario from 1884.

He initially conducted his medical practice from a house in York Street, on the corner with Brunswick Street, then known as “Doctor’s Corner”. His neighbor was Dr. Zebulon Currie who performed the first operation at Victoria Public Hospital. A number of historical records from Fredericton reveal that he practiced from the York St location between 1875 and 1900. However this is likely to have been seasonal activity, since Atherton relocated to Ontario during the 1880s. Atherton’s registered practice was located at 509 Church St, Toronto. Atherton was elected to membership at the fourteenth annual meeting of the American Public Health Association in 1886. At the time of his brother George’s death in April 1895, The Gleaner, a Fredericton newspaper described him as formerly of the city and now practicing in Toronto.

Atherton became a lecturer on the principles of surgery at the Women's College Hospital, Toronto, and surgeon to St. John's Hospital for Women, Toronto.

He also held the positions of vice president of the Canadian Medical Association and president of the Toronto Medical Society which was founded in 1878. He attended the Medical Faculty of Trinity College, Toronto in 1891.

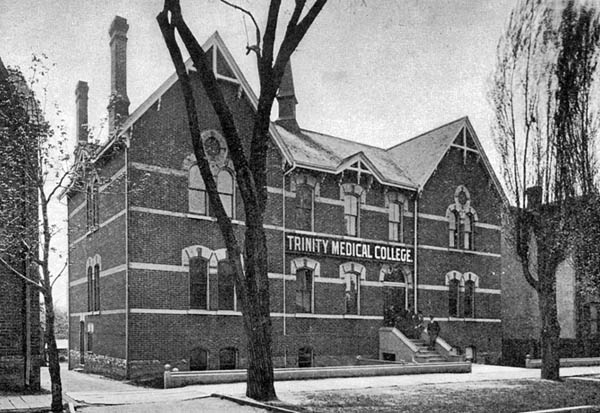
Trinity Medical College, Toronto

The United States National Library of Medicine holds a large element of his research under “Atherton (A.B.)”.

Atherton participated in the Seventy-Fourth Annual Meeting Of The British Medical Association, which took place in Toronto in August 1906.

By 1906 he was active in his practice in Fredericton.

At the age of 73, he travelled to California, accompanied by his wife in 1916. He settled permanently and received his Californian medical practitioner licence in 1918 and was a member of the California Medical Association.

Atherton is listed in the Directory of Deceased American Physicians (1804-1929).

== Medical publications and other writing ==
During his medical career, Atherton wrote a number of papers for the Canadian Medical Association. His specialism; the abdominal section of the uterine myomata.

In 1903, whilst surgeon at Victoria Public Hospital, Fredericton, he published a report on Retroperitoneal Hernia and acute strangulation of a knuckle of ileum in a pericael pouch.

Atherton was a contributor to American Medical Biographies edited by Howard Atwood Kelly and Walter Lincoln Burrage. Articles on notable and eminent physicians included Le Baron Botsford (1812 – 1888) and William Bayard (1814 – 1907). He also wrote a number of articles for The New England Journal of Medicine and was a visiting lecturer to Harvard Medical School.

== Canadian Politics ==
Atherton took an interest in politics. He was an unsuccessful candidate in the 1911 Canadian federal election, running against Oswald Smith Crocket in the York electoral district.

== Personal ==
Atherton was born into a Methodist family. Both Atherton, his parents and siblings are recorded as native in the census of 1851 and 1861.

He married Sarah Wiley (1845 – 1934) in Fredericton on May 20, 1868. In the 1891 census they were both living at St James Ward, Toronto. They had no children.

He continued working into his senior years and is mentioned in the New York Medical Journal having attended a function one month before he died.

He died on March 7, 1921, at the age of 78, in San Diego, California. He was buried at Greenwood Memorial Park in San Diego. His wife, Sarah continued to reside in San Diego until her death on December 18, 1934.

== Ancestry ==
He is a direct descendant of James Atherton, one of the First Settlers of New England; who arrived in Dorchester, Massachusetts, in the 1630s. His direct ancestor, Benjamin Atherton (1736-1816) was from Colonial Massachusetts and settled in Maugerville, New Brunswick, in 1765. His notable relatives include:

- Lizzie Aiken, a Union Army Civil War nurse
- Alfred Atherton (1921–2002), former U.S. Ambassador to Egypt
- Blaylock Atherton, 20th century New Hampshire politician
- Charles G. Atherton, an American politician and lawyer from New Hampshire
- Charles Humphrey Atherton, an American Federalist politician, banker and a distinguished attorney from New Hampshire.
- Cornelius Atherton, an iron manufacturer, gunmaker for the American Revolutionary War and an inventor
- Faxon Atherton, businessman, trader and landowner in Chile; and then in San Mateo County, California
- George W. Atherton, president of the Pennsylvania State University from 1882 until his death in 1906
- Henry B. Atherton, a soldier in the American Civil War from Vermont, a lawyer and state legislator for New Hampshire during the late 19th century.
- Henry F. Atherton, American business executive
- John Carlton Atherton, 20th century artist (third cousin)
- Joshua Atherton, a lawyer and early anti-slavery campaigner in Massachusetts and New Hampshire.
- Peter Atherton (Massachusetts politician), 18th century leader in Massachusetts, and uncle and surrogate father to his ancestor Benjamin Atherton.
- Simon Atherton, an American Shaker, who became highly successful on behalf of his own community, in selling herbs in Boston
- Thomas H. Atherton, an American architect. He studied at Princeton and MIT. He co-designed the Pennsylvania WWI war memorial in France
- Seth Boyden, inventor
- Uriah Atherton Boyden, inventor from Foxborough, Massachusetts best known for the development of the Boyden Turbine

== Biography ==
- Irvine, W H (1926) “Alfred Bennison Atherton”
- The Canadian Album Volume 1: Men of Canada. Edn. 1891. Author: Rev. William Cochrane.
