= Henry L. Atherton =

American businessman (1815–1896)

Henry Lee Atherton (June 12, 1815 – October 23, 1896) was a 19th-century American businessman and diplomat. He was responsible for a number of residential developments in vicinity of the Hudson River and Manhattan.

== Early life ==
Atherton was born into a maritime trading family from Castine, Maine. His father, Colonel Abel Willard Atherton (1777–1821) was born in Lancaster, Massachusetts, and served under General James Irish III. His mother was Margaret Weeks (1786–1869), the daughter of Lemuel Weeks, a wholesale merchant and importer from Portland, Maine.

== Career ==
Intent on making his fortune, he left Maine for New York City, where he specialized in the import of silk and dry goods along the Hudson River, setting up a location at 48 Broad Street, prior to 1847. He became a wealthy merchant and importer, changing his location to Reade St, prior to 1861. His business interests eventually diversified away from trading in merchandise, and into printing, and fire and life insurance, along with a number of realty projects in New York City from the 1850s onwards. He was a large shareholder of the Yonkers and New York Fire Insurance Company. Records from 1863 to 1865 illustrate that Atherton held 10% of the capital stock in this company. He also held 10% capital stock in the Widows and Orphans Benefit Life Insurance Company.

He was a founding member of a syndicate of wealthy gentlemen, including Samuel D. Babcock, William W. Woodworth, Charles W. Foster, and William D. Cromwell, who purchased 100-acres of land in 1852 in the Hudson valley, which thereafter became Riverdale Park. Atherton and this wealthy syndicate had been inspired by the recently deceased landscape architect, Andrew Jackson Downing, and set about planning a suburban residential development in Hudson Hill, as a utopia in the style and tradition of Llewellyn Park in New Jersey. Atherton and his syndicate designated a large area of land that descended in the direction of the Hudson River as a green area, free from future development. Intent on having a fine Riverdale estate, Atherton appointed the architect, Thomas S. Wall to design his new residence. A Gothic Revival style home built to Atherton's specifications, which later included with some Colonial Revival modifications after his death. His neighbors included his business partners, Samuel D. Babcock, William W. Woodworth and Charles W. Foster. He was subsequently joined in 1856 by Henry Foster Spaulding, followed by the financier and politician, Levi P. Morton.

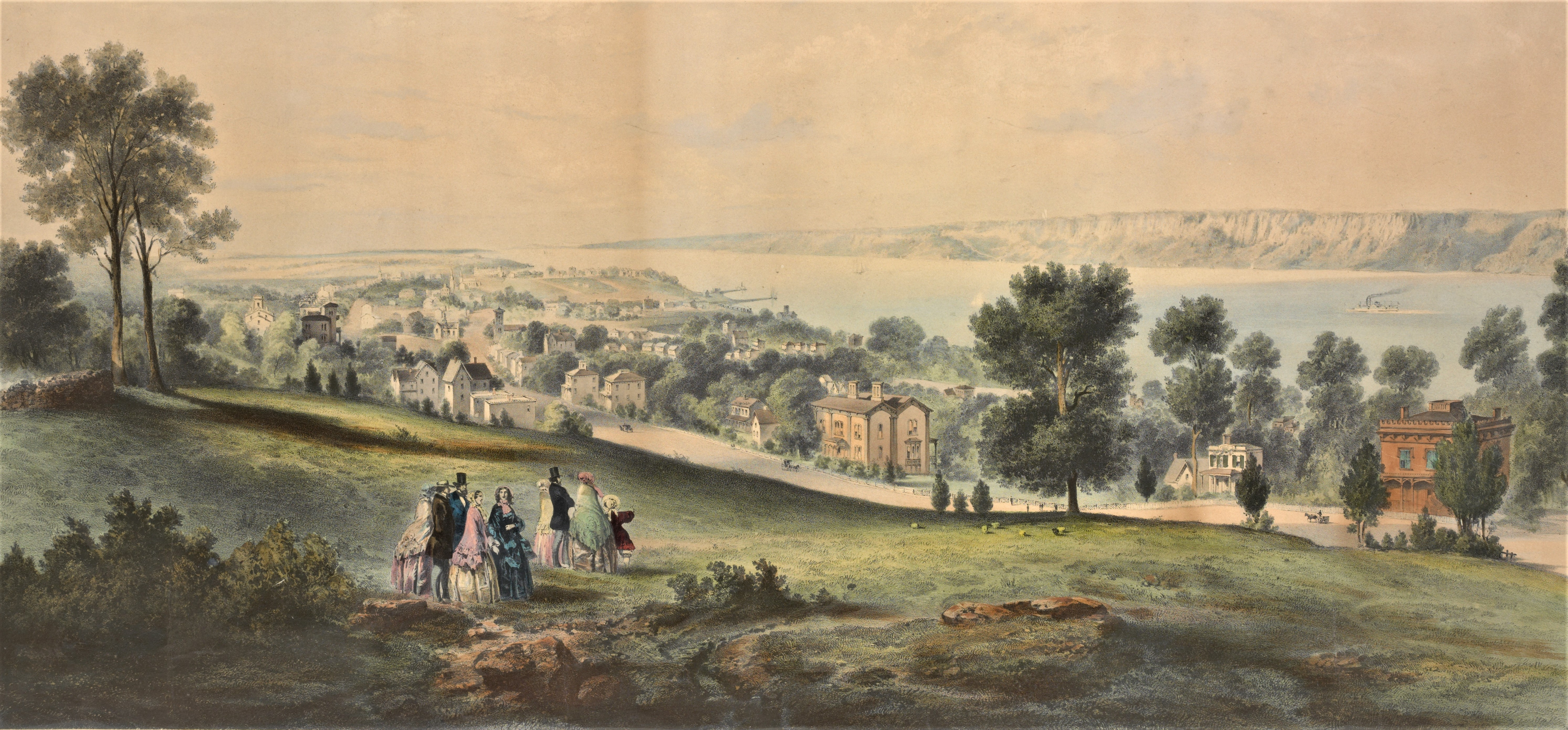
Riverdale and Yonkers, New York, c. 1860s

In 1853, he applied with for land grants at the time underwater adjacent to the Hudson Valley Railroad. This involved land reclamation. This area of Yonkers, New York was incorporated during the 1860s, and includes Atherton Street, named in his honor.

Leading up to the death of his wife in 1869, Atherton retired as a New York merchant. According to the 1870 census the value of his real estate was $75,000; and his personal wealth was in excess of $50,000.

Although Atherton retired from private enterprise as a merchant and importer, he continued as an investor for the next ten years, holding stock in numerous companies. In the 1870s, he entered into partnership with E. Brooks, forming the stationery and printing company, Atherton & Brooks; an enterprise that his son assumed daily management and oversight. This company was responsible for inventing a method of binding newspapers and music sheets.

At the age of sixty-five, he entered into public service as a diplomat, replacing Andrew Cone as consul of the United States in Pernambuco, Brazil from 1880.

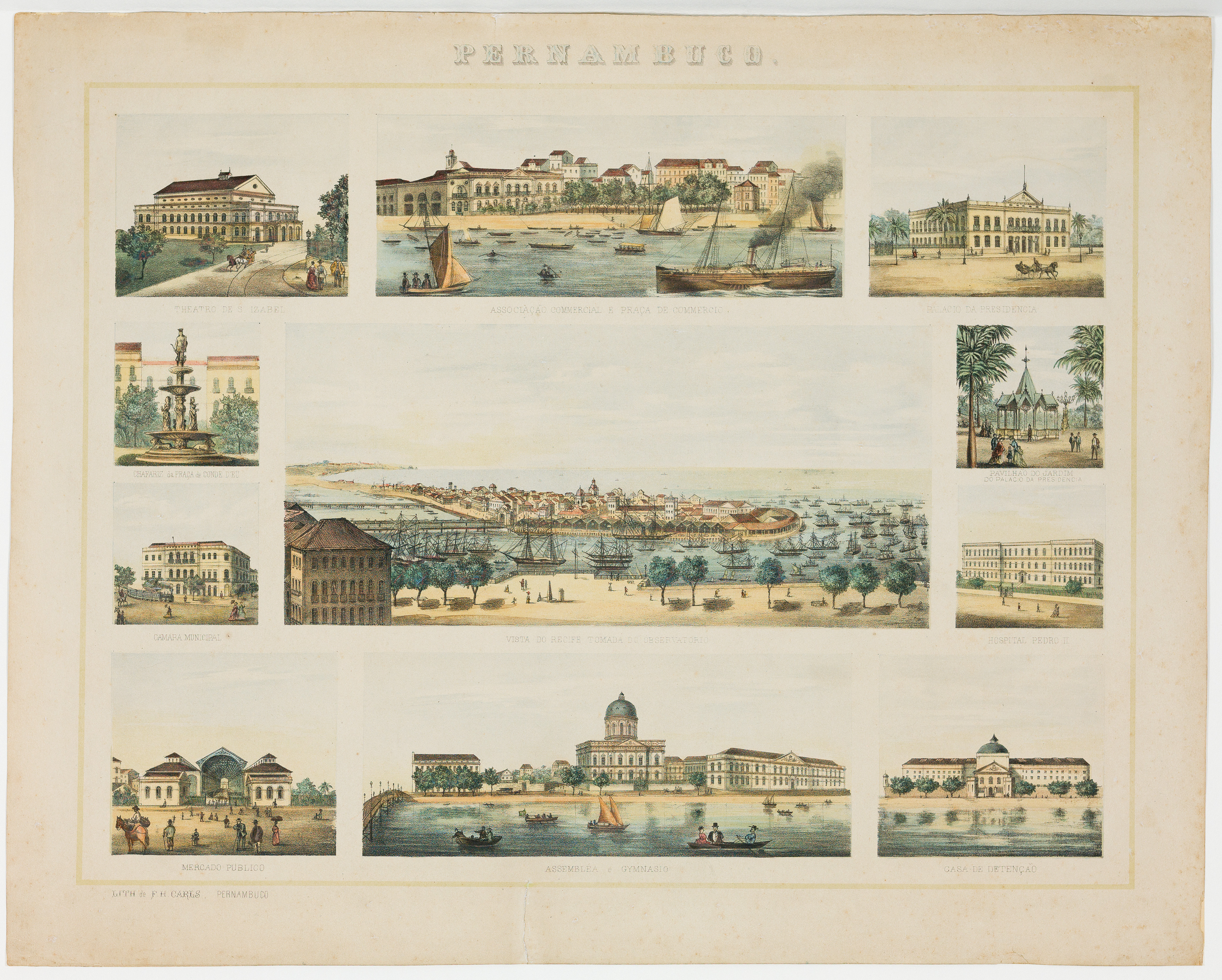
Views of Pernambuco, Brazil during Atherton's lifetime

His diplomatic posting to Pernambuco was his only overseas appointment for the United States Government. Brazil–United States relations had been established in 1815 and the United States were the first country to open a consulate in Recife, Pernambuco. Records show that he had been on the US Treasury payroll from the 1870s. His consular report relating to an alleged Brazilian cancer cure was dispatched to Washington, D.C. during 1884, and was presented to the United States Congress the following year. He is likely to have remained in this diplomatic role for nearly 9 years. His consular reports continued to 1887.

== Legacy ==
Atherton and William D. Cromwell had initially conceived the Riverdale development as a summer retreat from Manhattan. However, it is now contemporarily recognized as the earliest known suburban railroad development in New York City.

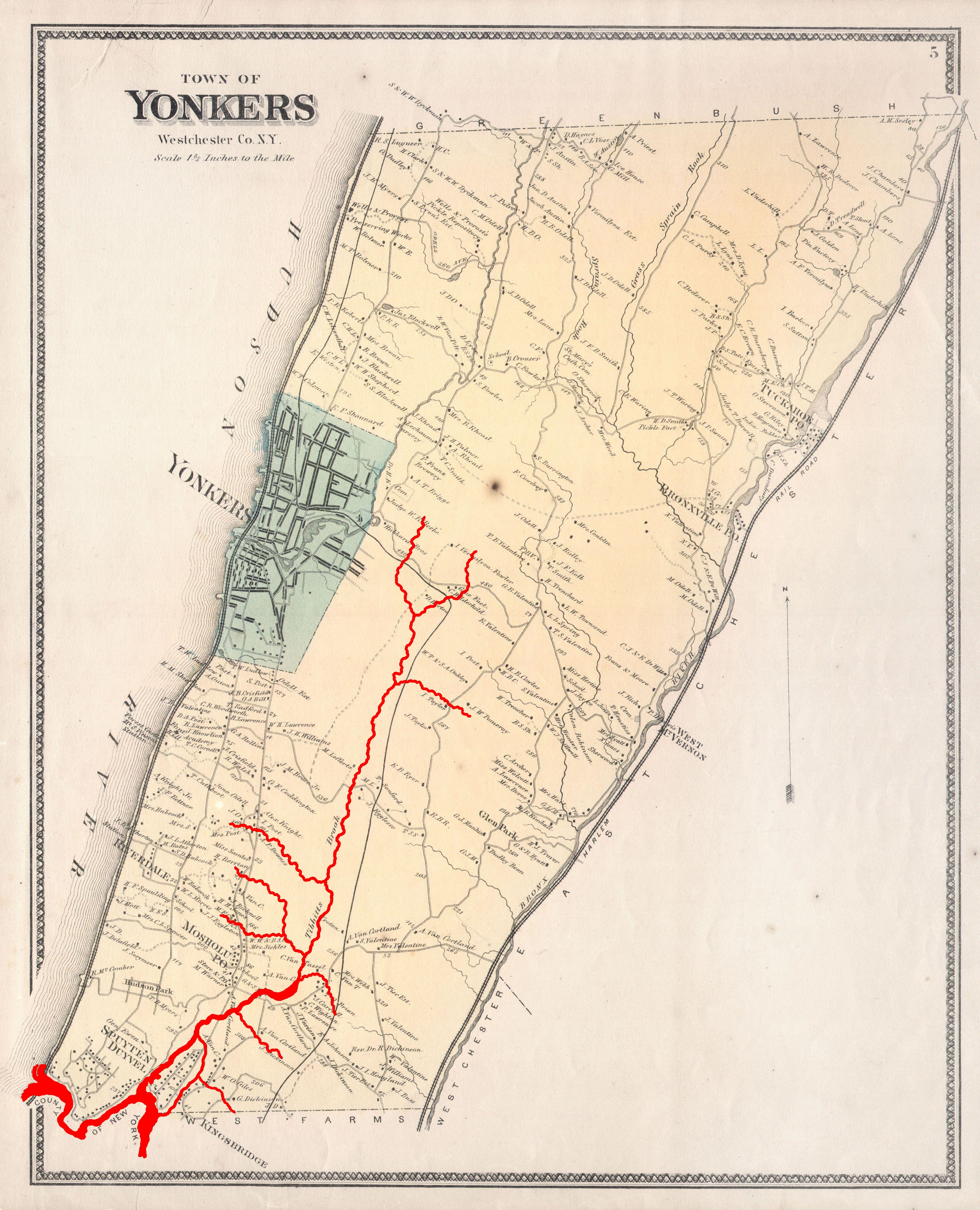
Map of Riverdale and Yonkers. Atherton's properties are featured

The H.L. Atherton residence forms part of an extremely rare collection of lithographs from 1860, within the New York Public Library.

In 1990, the New York City Landmarks Preservation Commission voted to create the Riverdale Historic District, bound roughly by 252nd and 254th Streets and Palisade and Independence Avenues. As of 2022, the Henry L. Atherton Villa, located at West 252 Street is the private residence of renowned poet and art collector, Stanley Moss.

Atherton St, Yonkers is named in his honor.

== Personal ==
Atherton married Almira Stuart Woodworth (1815–1869), from Hudson, New York, the daughter of William Gershom Woodworth (1776–1855) and Clarissa Heath on December 1, 1836.

Atherton was father to at least one son and three daughters. His eldest daughter Eliza married Emile Guyon de Pontblanc in 1858.

His son Henry L Atherton Jr. was proprietor of Atherton & Coles of New York, a law printers and stationers, and was married to Helen Plumb, granddaughter of merchant William Yale of the Yale family. Their daughter Jeannette Yale Hughes was adopted by her aunt Jeannette Yale (1872) and uncle, artist George H. Hughes.

In 1867, his daughter Constance, married Senator George Henry Forster. His new son-in-law was an attorney and a partner in the law firm, Weeks, DeForest & Forster.

His wife, Almira died after a long illness on October 21, 1869, in New York City at the age of 54.

His grandson was Henry Atherton Forster (1868–1932), a lawyer and historian from New York City.

Atherton died in Los Angeles, California on October 23, 1896, and is buried at Hillside Memorial Park Cemetery; at the time a private cemetery in Redlands, California. His entire estate remained in dispute for almost thirteen years, and his will was proven at the Surrogate's Courthouse in New York City, on February 9, 1909, with Henry Atherton Forster as the primary beneficiary.

== Ancestry ==
Atherton was a New England descendant of Puritan heritage, whose ancestors had settled in Massachusetts Colony. He a direct descendant of James Atherton, one of the First Settlers of New England; who arrived in Dorchester, Massachusetts in the 1630s. His great-grandfather was Colonel Peter Atherton. His relatives include Joshua Atherton, Charles Humphrey Atherton, Henry B. Atherton, Thomas H. Atherton, Charles G. Atherton, Cornelius Atherton, Joseph Ballard Atherton, and Uriah A. Boyden.
