= Henry Atherton =

Henry Atherton may refer to:

- Henry B. Atherton (1835–1906), US Civil War veteran, and lawyer
- Henry F. Atherton (1883–1949), American business executive, and lawyer
- Henry H. Atherton (1833–1904), American politician and merchant
- Henry L. Atherton (1815–1896), American businessman and diplomat
- Henry Valpey Atherton (1911–1967), American lawyer, part of the Nuremberg Trials
- Henry Vernon Atherton (1923–2016), American professor, and pioneer in the dairy industry

== See also ==
- Henry Atherton Frost (1883–1952), American architect
