= Oswald Smith Crocket =

Canadian Supreme Court judge (1868–1945)

The Honourable Oswald Smith Crocket
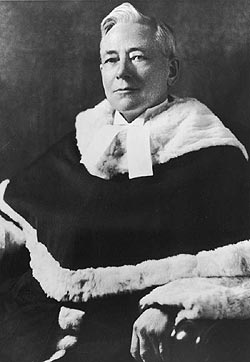

Puisne Justice of the Supreme Court of Canada
- In office September 21, 1932 – April 13, 1943
- Nominated by: Richard Bedford Bennett
- Preceded by: Edmund Leslie Newcombe
- Succeeded by: Ivan Rand

Member of the Canadian Parliament for York, New Brunswick
- In office November 3, 1904 – December 10, 1913
- Preceded by: Alex Gibson, Jr.
- Succeeded by: Harry Fulton McLeod

Personal details
- Born: April 13, 1868 Chatham, New Brunswick
- Died: March 2, 1945 (aged 76) Ottawa, Ontario
- Party: Conservative
- Spouse: Clarine Stevenson
- Children: 3
- Education: University of New Brunswick (BA)

Oswald Smith Crocket (April 13, 1868 – March 2, 1945) was a Canadian lawyer, politician, and Puisne Justice of the Supreme Court of Canada.

== Early life ==
Crocket was born in Chatham, New Brunswick on April 13, 1868, to William Crocket and Marion Caldwell. In 1886 he received a Bachelor of Arts from the University of New Brunswick. He was a correspondent for the Saint John Globe and was called to the New Brunswick Bar in 1892 and began practising law.

Oswald's older brother James Harvie Crocket became a journalist and newspaper publisher. James was a staunch conservative who played a significant role in the election of Douglas Hazen in 1903, and had significant influence in New Brunswick conservative circles.

In 1904, he was elected to the House of Commons of Canada in the riding of York, New Brunswick as a Conservative, defeating Liberal incumbent Alexander Gibson, Jr. He was re-elected in 1908, defeating Liberal candidate Nelson W. Brown, and re-elected again in 1911 defeating physician Alfred Bennison Atherton.

On December 11, 1913, Crocket was appointed a puisne judge of the Supreme Court of New Brunswick, King's Bench. On September 20, 1916, he was concurrently appointed a judge of the Court of Divorce and Matrimonial Cases of New Brunswick.

== Justice of the Supreme Court of Canada ==
On September 21, 1932, Prime Minister R.B. Bennett appointed Crocket to the Supreme Court at the age of 64, filling the vacancy left by the death of Edmund Leslie Newcombe on December 9, 1931. Bennett had struggled to identify a suitable candidate from New Brunswick, even writing to Premier Charles Dow Richards that there was "no one in New Brunswick fitted by training and experience to become a member of the Court." Although Bennett thought of Crocket as a friend, he worried that Crocket's judicial experience was limited to the trial level, with no service on an appellate court. Crocket had lobbied to Bennett for his appointment. During the appointment process, future justice Ivan Rand agreed to the appointment, but Conservative politicians objected to Bennett.

In the Reference concerning a statute abolishing the appeal to the Judicial Committee of the Privy Council, the Court in a 4–2 decision held that Parliament had the authority to abolish the appeal. Crocket in dissent, found the bill was unconstitutional as it interfered with the provincial administration of justice and effected the relationship between the provinces and the Crown. (Note: Reference as to the Legislative Competence of the Parliament of Canada to Enact Bill No. 9 of the Fourth Session, Eighteenth Parliament of Canada, Entitled "An Act to Amend the Supreme Court Act", 1940 CanLII 64, (1940) SCR 49, Supreme Court (Canada)) The Second World War delayed the appeal to the Privy Council until 1946, which held Parliament had the authority to terminate the appeal.

Crocket served on the Court until he reached the mandatory retirement age of 75 in 1943.

== Later life ==
He died in 1945, at home.

== Appraisal ==
Historians Snell and Vaughan describe Crocket as a weak appointment to the Court. He was regarded as inflexible, deeply traditionalist in his outlook, and that approach created friction with future Chief Justice Lyman Duff. Duff had a poor relationship and described as having little respect for Crocket's legal knowledge or abilities. A surviving anecdote describes Duff stated he would change his decision after Crocket, in hoping to please Duff, told him he would write a concurring decision. Justice Ivan Rand described Crocket as "the stupidest man in New Brunswick."
