= Samuel Abbot =

American lawyer

- Born: March 30, 1786; Wilton, New Hampshire
- Died: January 2, 1839 (aged 52); Wilton
- Occupation: lawyer
- Known for: starch manufacture

Samuel Abbot (March 30, 1786, Wilton, New Hampshire – January 2, 1839, Wilton) was an American lawyer and the inventor of a process which made starch from potatoes.

== Biography ==
=== Origins ===
Samuel Abbot was the 11th of the 12 children of Abiel Abbot, a farmer and an early settler of Wilton, New Hampshire. His father was a staunch Whig, an officer of the militia during the Revolutionary War, often the representative from Wilton in the New Hampshire General Court, and much entrusted with the business of the town. He formed an excellent farm out of the wilderness. Of his 12 children, 10 lived to be adults. All of them were well educated, and three went to Harvard College: Abiel (a D.D., later of Peterborough), Jacob (later of Windham) and Samuel. Abiel Abbot Sr., was the son of Captain John Abbot of Andover, Massachusetts, who was descended, in the fifth generation, from George Abbot, who emigrated from Yorkshire, England, and settled in Andover in 1643.

=== Education ===
Samuel Abbot pursued his preparatory studies in part under his brother Abiel, but was chiefly fitted for college at the public school at Andover, Massachusetts, which was known for the accuracy of its instruction and the scholars it offered for admission to universities. Samuel graduated from Harvard in 1808.

Soon after his graduation, Samuel Abbot entered the law office of C. H. Atherton, Esq., of Amherst, New Hampshire, as a student at law. Atherton availed himself of Samuel's classical knowledge to prepare his son, C. G. Atherton, later a United States senator, for college. For this purpose, Samuel resided for a time with the Atherton family. Samuel Abbot was admitted to the bar in 1812, and practiced his profession, first at Wilton, and then at Dunstable (now Nashua, New Hampshire).

=== Law practice ===
In 1817, Abbot opened his law office at Ipswich, Massachusetts. Here his professional efforts were favorably noticed by the judges of the Supreme Judicial Court as indicating a well disciplined and argumentative mind. He would undoubtedly have met with success at the bar if his tastes had corresponded with the duties of his profession. It much better accorded with Abbot's feelings to pay the debt of a poor man, than to pocket the fee of a suit against him. His profession was no favorite with him, and he surrendered the prospects it offered to the natural bent of his mind in following a course of general reading.

=== Starch factory ===
In his course of reading, Abbot was particularly attentive to chemistry and mechanics, which had long been favorite pursuits with him. His aim was to apply them to the useful purposes of life. The qualities and uses of that most common of vegetables, the potato, with the machinery by which its flour might be extracted on a large scale by horse or water power, early attracted his attention. A starch factory at Wilton, under the care of his brother Ezra, was the result of his genius.

In 1818, Samuel returned to Wilton for the purpose of superintending and improving the starch manufacturing concern. Here, and occasionally in the nearby town of Jaffrey, where a branch of the business had been established, he spent the remainder of his life, devoting his time principally to literary and scientific pursuits, and for relaxation to business and mechanical labor.

The flour of the potato recommended itself to the proprietors of the cotton cloth factories in New England for use as sizing, in preference to starch made from wheat flour. The demand for potato flour became general, and its manufacture a source of profit. The farmers of the neighborhood were also much benefitted in their agriculture by this manufacturer, as it afforded them a home market and ready pay for one of their most abundant and safest crops.

=== Scientific pursuits ===
In his continuing studies, Abbot informed himself on most of the discoveries of the modern science of that time, so that it was difficult to touch on any subject, however abstruse, with which he had not made himself acquainted, and on which he could not throw light and give information. The peculiar characteristics of his mind were accuracy, caution, and clearness. With a quickness almost like intuition, he detected the weakness or fallacy of an argument, and no man saw more clearly its legitimate application or the point at which its force ceased.

In experimental philosophy, such was his caution that he was seldom if ever misled by his facts to form an erroneous theory. In 1828, when the "pneumatic paradox," as it was called, was attracting the attention of scholars, he first suggested a true theory, which was afterwards experimentally proved by his nephew, Jos. H. Abbot, and an article thereon published in the American Journal of Science and Arts.

In 1837-1838, he detected the fallacy of the instrument called the geometer, to which the attention of Congress was then called. The instrument supposedly applied an alleged discovery in magnetism by which, in addition to the direction of the North Pole, latitude could be ascertained.

=== Religious and civic pursuits ===
Theology was a favorite pursuit of Samuel Abbot. Without being a religious disputant, he was well versed in the history of Christianity and its various sects. Very few among the clergy were better skilled in Biblical criticism, or better acquainted with the religious controversies of the day. Tolerant and kind to all Christian sects, he embraced the Unitarian as distinguished from the Trinitarian faith.

In establishing and sustaining a Lyceum for Wilton, as well as in creating libraries for the town, for the parish, for the Sunday school, and for the Sabbath reading room, Samuel Abbot was a leading agent and liberal contributor. He represented the town in the state legislature for five years. He was a member of the school committee. He was a superintendent of the Sunday school and a lecturer before the Lyceum.

He took a lively interest in the morals and education of the young and conferred benefits on the rising generation, the extent and magnitude of which cannot be calculated. If he did not create, he at least did much to sustain and perpetuate that standard of morals and taste for reading and education by which Wilton was distinguished in the men and scholars which proceeded from her loins.

His life was guided by the dictates of an enlightened conscience. While he felt and exhibited strong and decided marks of disapprobation, like his father he was never known to be in a passion. He was a man of uncommon meekness and modesty. No ambition for professional or political distinction beset him. Retiring in his feelings, averse to all ostentation, he abandoned the law, a profession regarded as the common highway to distinction; instead, he took a course of life which best agreed with his peaceful disposition: the acquirement of knowledge. The consciousness that he was useful satisfied all his worldly aspirations.

=== Death ===
Samuel Abbot died at the age of 53. While superintending the manufacture of starch at Jaffrey, the interior of the building caught fire. He entered it for the purpose of rescuing a trunk containing his accounts and securities. His retreat was arrested by a sudden outbreak of smoke and flame. He fell suffocated and was consumed. Such was the combustible state of the building, and so rapid the spread of the fire, that no relief could reach him. The remains of his body were found amidst the ashes of the building.
