= Clayton Compromise =

The Clayton Compromise was a plan drawn up in 1848 by a bipartisan United States Senate committee headed by John M. Clayton of Delaware for organizing the Oregon Territory and the Southwest. Clayton first attempted to form a special committee of eight members, equally divided by region and party, two northern and two Southern men from each of the two major parties (Democrats and Whigs), with Clayton himself acting as chairman, to consider the questions relating to the extension of slavery. It recognized the validity of Oregon's existing antislavery laws, prohibited the territorial legislatures of New Mexico and California from acting on slavery, and provided for appeal of all slavery cases from the territorial courts to the Supreme Court of the United States.

The bill passed the Senate on July 27, 1848, but it was tabled in the United States House of Representatives by a coalition of Southern Whigs led by future Confederate Vice President Alexander H. Stephens. Stephens believed that the compromise would completely surrender Constitutional rights in the territories, as he was certain that the Supreme Court would rule against slavery in the territories.

== Background ==
In the 19th century, manifest destiny was a widely held belief in the United States. It held that settlers from the U.S. were destined to expand westward across North America to the Pacific Ocean.

The Mexican–American War was fought between United States and Mexico from 1846 to 1848. In the Treaty of Guadalupe Hidalgo in 1848, Mexico ceded parts of the modern day American Southwest to the United States. This led to debate over whether slavery would be allowed in this Mexican Cession once it was organized into territories and states. The Wilmot Proviso in 1848 was another attempt to settle the question other than the Clayton Compromise, by banning slavery throughout the Cession.

With the settlement of the Oregon boundary dispute in 1846, the U.S. gained territory south of the 49th parallel line. The acquisition of Oregon territory in 1848 led to debate over slavery there as well. When established, the territory encompassed an area that included the current states of Oregon, Washington, and Idaho, as well as parts of Wyoming and Montana.

== In the compromise ==
The Clayton compromise was a bill the committee reported out on July 18, 1848. It created a territorial government for Oregon, which allowed the unofficial provisional government's antislavery ban to continue in effect until the new territorial legislature ruled for or against slavery. But the Compromise explicitly banned the territorial governments for New Mexico and California from taking any action either establishing or prohibiting slavery. The decision was left to the federal judiciary and, ultimately, to the Supreme Court of the United States. Because of this, Senator Thomas Corwin of Ohio said that the Clayton Compromise proposed to enact a lawsuit rather than a law.

The Compromise passed the Senate but it failed in the House, which refused to abandon the Wilmot Proviso.

Southern Democrats and Whigs supported the compromise while Northerners from both parties generally opposed it. Charles G. Atherton and Samuel S. Phelps were the only New England Democratic and Whig Senators, respectively, to vote in favor of the Clayton Compromise bill. If Georgia's Alexander H. Stephens and seven other southern Whigs had voted along with other Southerners, the Clayton Compromise would have survived and passed.

== Compromise of 1850 ==
The Clayton Compromise of 1848 failed, which led eventually to the Compromise of 1850, which directly borrowed some language from the earlier proposal; the language - which assigned adjudication of the slavery issue to the courts - was again used in the Kansas-Nebraska Act of 1854.

The 1850 Compromise added California as a free state and allowed popular sovereignty to decide the slavery issue in the Mexican Cession. It also created a stricter fugitive slave act and abolished the slave trade in Washington D.C.. Other questions were left unsettled; nevertheless, the Compromise of 1850 helped to hold off for a decade a complete break between the free states of the North and the slave states of the South.

== See also ==
- Compromise of 1850
