= Samuel Smith (New Hampshire politician) =

American politician

Member of the U.S. House of Representatives from New Hampshire's At-Large district
- In office March 4, 1813 – March 3, 1815
- Preceded by: Samuel Dinsmoor
- Succeeded by: Charles Humphrey Atherton

Personal details
- Born: November 11, 1765 Peterborough, Province of New Hampshire, British America
- Died: April 25, 1842 (aged 76) Peterborough, New Hampshire, U.S.
- Resting place: Village Cemetery; Peterborough, New Hampshire
- Citizenship: U.S.
- Party: Federalist
- Spouse: Sally Garfield
- Relations: Jeremiah Smith; Robert Smith
- Profession: Merchant; Manufacturer; Politician

Samuel Smith (November 11, 1765 – April 25, 1842) was an American politician, and a U.S. Representative from New Hampshire.

== Early life ==
Born in Peterborough in the Province of New Hampshire, Smith attended Phillips Exeter Academy, Exeter, New Hampshire, and Phillips Academy, Andover, Massachusetts.

== Career ==
Smith engaged in mercantile pursuits and served as moderator in town meetings, 1794-1811.

Elected as a Federalist to the Thirteenth Congress, Smith was United States Representative for the state of New Hampshire from March 4, 1813 – March 3, 1815. He was not a candidate for renomination in 1814 and resumed his former business pursuits. In 1828, he engaged in the manufacture of paper and cotton goods.

== Death ==
Smith died in Peterborough, Hillsborough County, New Hampshire, on April 25, 1842 (age 76 years, 165 days). He is interred at Village Cemetery, Peterborough, New Hampshire.

== Family life ==
Smith was brother of Jeremiah Smith and uncle of Robert Smith. He married Sally Garfield on November 10, 1793 and they had twelve children: Jeremiah, Frederick A., Maria, Samuel Garfield, Albert, William Sidney, Alexander Hamilton, Elizabeth Morison, Sarah Jane, Maria, Mary Soley, and Ellen.

U.S. House of Representatives
| Preceded by Samuel Dinsmoor | Member of the U.S. House of Representatives from New Hampshire's at-large congressional district 1813 – 1815 | Succeeded by Charles Humphrey Atherton |
