= York (federal electoral district) =

Former federal electoral district in New Brunswick, Canada

New Brunswick electoral district

Defunct federal electoral district
- Legislature: House of Commons
- District created: 1867
- District abolished: 1914
- First contested: 1867
- Last contested: 1913 by-election

Demographics
- Census division(s): York

York was a federal electoral district in New Brunswick, Canada, that was represented in the House of Commons of Canada from 1867 to 1917.

It was created as part of the British North America Act 1867. It consisted of the County of York. It was abolished in 1914 when it was merged into York—Sunbury riding.

== Members of Parliament ==
This riding elected the following members of Parliament:

Parliament	Years	Member	Party
York
1st	1867–1868	Charles Fisher	Liberal
1st	1868–1872	John Pickard	Independent Liberal
2nd	1872–1874	John Pickard	Independent Liberal
3rd	1874–1878	John Pickard	Independent Liberal
4th	1878–1882	John Pickard	Independent Liberal
5th	1882–1883	John Pickard	Independent Liberal
5th	1884–1887	Thomas Temple	Conservative
6th	1887–1891	Thomas Temple	Conservative
7th	1891–1896	Thomas Temple	Conservative
8th	1896–1900	George Eulas Foster	Conservative
9th	1900–1901	Alexander Gibson	Liberal
9th	1901–1904	Alexander Gibson	Liberal
10th	1904–1908	Oswald Smith Crocket	Conservative
11th	1908–1911	Oswald Smith Crocket	Conservative
12th	1911–1913	Oswald Smith Crocket	Conservative
12th	1913–1917	Harry Fulton McLeod	Conservative
Riding dissolved into York—Sunbury

== Election results ==
1867 Canadian federal election
Party	Candidate	Votes
Liberal	Charles Fisher	acclaimed

By-election: On Mr. Fisher's resignation, 3 October 1868 to become Judge of the Supreme Court of New Brunswick

By-election on 1868/10/28
Party	Candidate	Votes
Independent Liberal	John Pickard	acclaimed

1872 Canadian federal election
Party	Candidate	Votes
Independent Liberal	John Pickard	acclaimed

1874 Canadian federal election
Party	Candidate	Votes
Independent Liberal	John Pickard	acclaimed

1878 Canadian federal election
Party	Candidate	Votes
Independent Liberal	John Pickard	1,490
Unknown	C.H.B. Fisher	834

1882 Canadian federal election
Party	Candidate	Votes
Independent Liberal	John Pickard	2,359
Unknown	John James Fraser	1,442

By-election: On Mr. Pickard's death, 17 December 1883

By-election on 29 June 1884
Party	Candidate	Votes
Conservative	Thomas Temple	2,012
Liberal	G.F. Gregory	1,834

1887 Canadian federal election
Party	Candidate	Votes
Conservative	Thomas Temple	2,172
Liberal	G.F. Gregory	1,768

1891 Canadian federal election
Party	Candidate	Votes
Conservative	Thomas Temple	2,048
Liberal	Frederick Pemberton Thompson	1,821

1896 Canadian federal election
Party	Candidate	Votes
Conservative	George Eulas Foster	3,306
Liberal	Edmond N. Allen	1,764

1900 Canadian federal election
Party	Candidate	Votes
Liberal	Alexander Gibson, Jr.	2,937
Independent Conservative	Joseph McLeod	2,861

By-election: On election being declared void by a Court decision, 11 June 1901

By-election on 28 December 1901
Party	Candidate	Votes
Liberal	Alexander Gibson, Jr.	2,800
Independent Liberal	Joseph McLeod	1,976

1904 Canadian federal election
Party	Candidate	Votes
Conservative	Oswald Smith Crocket	3,096
Liberal	Alexander Gibson, Jr.	2,934

1908 Canadian federal election
Party	Candidate	Votes
Conservative	Oswald Smith Crocket	3,653
Liberal	Nelson W. Brown	2,784

1911 Canadian federal election
Party	Candidate	Votes
Conservative	Oswald Smith Crocket	4,143
Unknown	Alfred Bennison Atherton	2,474

By-election: On Mr. Crocket being appointed judge, 11 December 1913

By-election on 31 December 1913
Party	Candidate	Votes
Conservative	Harry Fulton McLeod	acclaimed

== See also ==
- List of Canadian electoral districts
- Historical federal electoral districts of Canada
