= Ella Blaylock Atherton =

British-American physician (1860–1933)

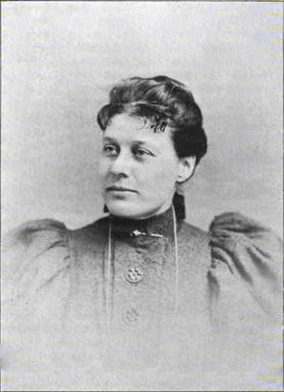
- Born: Ella Blaylock; January 4, 1860; Ulverston, Lancashire, England
- Died: September 4, 1933 (aged 73); Nashua, New Hampshire, U.S.
- Citizenship: British
- Education: Queen's University
- Occupation: Physician

Ella Blaylock Atherton (January 4, 1860 – September 4, 1933) was a British-born American physician. Atherton was the first woman in the province of Quebec to earn a diploma in medicine from a Canadian institution. She was the first woman admitted to a medical society in the U.S. state of Vermont, the first to be president of a local medical society in New Hampshire, and the first woman to perform abdominal surgery in New Hampshire.

== Early years and education ==
Ella Blaylock was born January 4, 1860, in Ulverston, Lancashire, England. She was the daughter of William and Margaret Blaylock (née Schollick), and granddaughter of Thomas Blaylock.

Atherton was educated by private tutors, and also at Georgeville Academy and McGill Normal School in Montreal. She graduated with honors from McGill Normal School in 1881.

Atherton's desire to study medicine was reportedly met with opposition from all of her friends except her mother. She therefore decided to educate herself, serving for two years as principal of Mansonville Academy in Quebec, and tutoring during her whole college course. While there, she studied medicine with Dr. J. McMillan, of Mansonville.

The following year, Atherton entered a medical school at Kingston, Ontario. Her first course of lectures was at the Royal College of Physicians and Surgeons, where she studied alongside male students. Much friction resulted, leading to the founding of the Woman's Medical College, affiliated with Queen's University, Kingston. At the women's college, Atherton attended three courses of lectures, and earned diplomas in medicine and surgery from Queen's University in 1887. (Margaret Amelia Corlis had graduated in 1885.)

While in college, Atherton served assistant demonstrator of anatomy for one year, and later for one year had led the practical anatomy class. Atherton was the first woman in the province of Quebec, and the eighth in Canada, to earn a diploma in medicine from a Canadian institution.

== Career ==
In 1887, Atherton was refused a license to practise in Quebec due to her gender. Her experience is of interest from the fact that three years later, 1890, the census gave 3,555 women physicians in the United States. She was also physician in charge, for six months, to the Kingston City Dispensary.

During the year following her graduation, Atherton moved to Newport, Vermont to practice medicine. She later practiced in Nashua, New Hampshire. Her papers from 1898 onwards are held at Dartmouth College.

Beginning in 1889, Atherton served as physician to the Home for Aged Women in Nashua, and in 1894, Atherton joined the staff of the Nashua Emergency Hospital. Atherton focused her work on diseases affecting women and children, and performed all the minor and some of the capital gynecological operations.

Atherton was the first woman admitted to a medical society in the state of Vermont, first to serve as president of a local medical society in New Hampshire; and the first woman to perform abdominal surgery in New Hampshire.

During the summer of 1926, Atherton toured the hospitals of Europe with a group of other American physicians.

== Affiliations ==
Atherton was a member of the Orleans County (Vermont) Medical Society; the New Hampshire Medical Society; the Nashua Medical Association, secretary from 1892; the American Medical Association; the Congress of Medico-Climatology; and the Nashua Fortnightly Club. She was also a member of the New Hampshire Surgical Club, the Hillsborough County Medical Society, the Nashua Emergency Hospital Association, and the Nashua Home for Aged Women.

== Personal life ==
In 1898, in Concord, New Hampshire, Atherton married the widower, Capt. Henry B. Atherton, a lawyer, newspaper editor and Civil War veteran; she was his second wife. The couple had two children: Blaylock Atherton (b. 1900) and Ives (b. 1903).

Atherton traveled extensively with her husband to Newfoundland and Labrador and other parts of Canada.

Atherton was a member of the Woman's Auxiliary and the Young Women's Christian Association. She supported women's suffrage and was a member of the New Hampshire Woman Suffrage Society. She was also a charter member of the Woman's Auxiliary of the YMCA and the Fortnightly Club. In religion, she was Episcopalian, and attended the Church of the Good Shepherd in Nashua.

She was widowed when Capt. Atherton died in 1906. Atherton died in New Hampshire, September 4, 1933, and was buried at Edgewood Cemetery in Nashua Her son Blaylock Atherton presided over the New Hampshire state senate from 1951 to 1952, and was acting governor briefly in 1952.
