= McGill Faculty of Education =

Education school of McGill University

Coordinates: 45.5045°N 73.5801°W

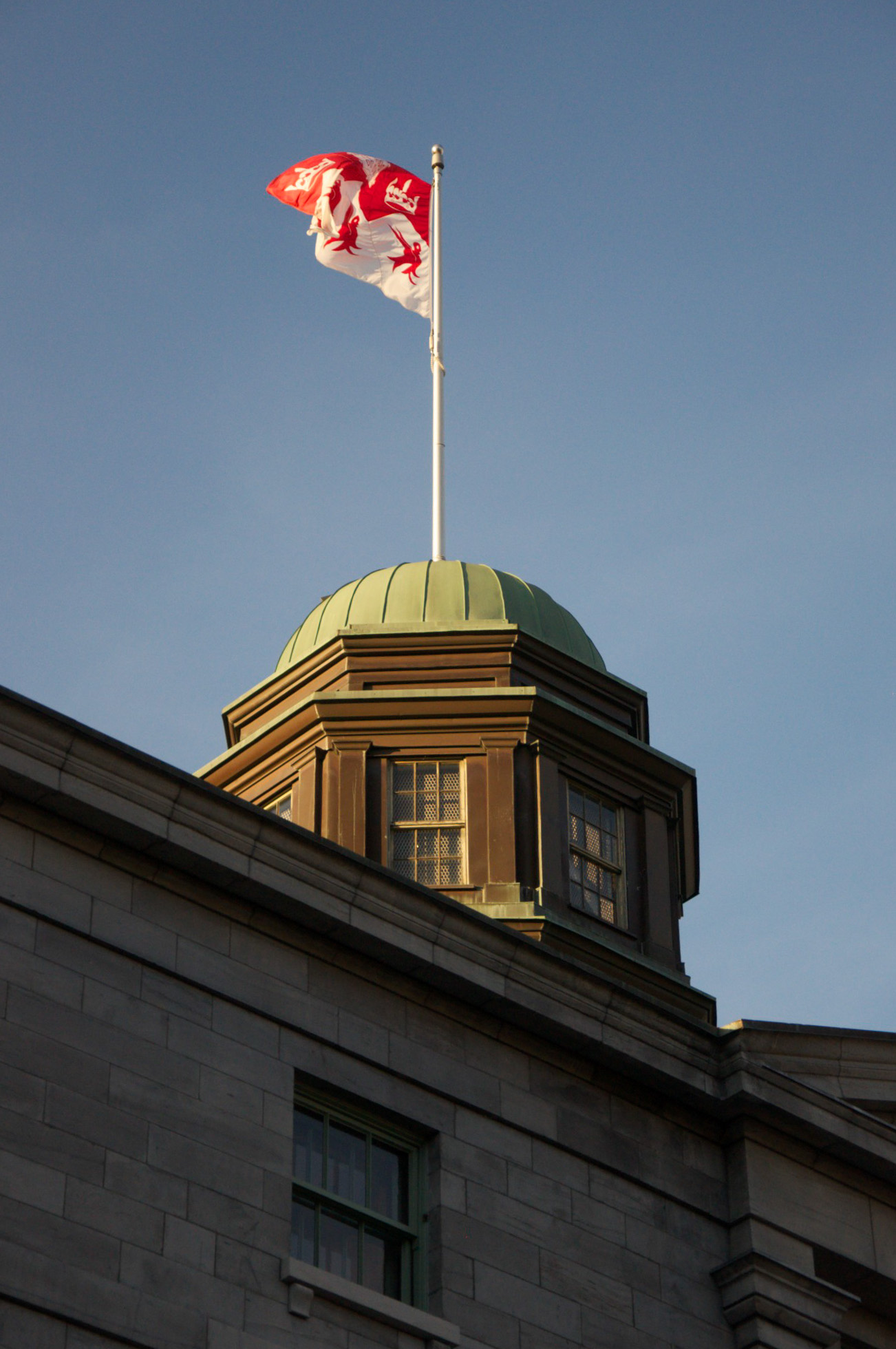
- Type: Public education school
- Parent institution: McGill University
- Dean: Dr. Vivek Venkatesh
- Location: Montreal, Quebec, Canada
- Website: mcgill.ca/education

The McGill Faculty of Education is a constituent faculty of McGill University, offering undergraduate and graduate degrees and professional development in education.

== History ==
The faculty traces its beginnings to the McGill Normal School, established in 1857. In 1907, the school was moved to Macdonald College in Sainte-Anne-de-Bellevue, Quebec, where it became the School for Teachers. In the 1950s, the School for Teachers was combined with the Department of Education (which had been established within the Faculty of Arts and Science) and the McGill School of Physical Education to become the Institute of Education. It was renamed to the Faculty of Education in 1965. In 1971, it moved to McGill's downtown Montreal main campus located at 3700 McTavish Street.

== Degrees ==
The undergraduate degrees offered are the Bachelor of Education and the Bachelor of Science (Kinesiology). Students can specialize in specific programs including secondary education, physical and health education, teaching English as a second language, teaching French as a second language (i.e., pédagogie de l'immersion française), and kindergarten/elementary education. The kindergarten/elementary education program requires 3–5 years of full-time study to complete depending on an applicant's prior level of education. If an applicant has a Cégep degree, they can complete the degree in 4 years rather than 5 and if an applicant already has a Bachelor's degree, the program can be completed in 3 years. In addition, the Faculty offers community-specific programs such as a Greek Language and Culture program and a Jewish Education program (in conjunction with the Department of Jewish Studies), one of the few Jewish teacher training programs in Canada. The Faculty has specific programs for teacher teaching in Indigenous Communities. The Faculty of Education also has an accelerated program (MATL) for students who have already attained a Bachelor's degree in a specific field and are now looking to teach.

Students enrolled in the Education program (Kindergarten/Elementary, Secondary, Physical and Health Education) must embark on four field practicums. The field experiences are offered in either English and French. With the help of an experienced teacher, students are expected to apply the theory learned at McGill into the classrooms.

Graduate degrees offered include the Master of Education, Master of Arts, and the Doctor of Philosophy. For instance students can be part of school/applied child psychology program.

The Faculty also offers professional development programs such as Certificate and Diploma programs offered by the Department of Educational and Counselling Psychology.

== Programs ==
- Kindergarten and Elementary
- Secondary
- Physical and Health Education
- Teaching English as a Second Language (TESL)
- Pédagogie de l'immersion Française (PIF)
- Concurrent BSc/BEd
- Concurrent BEd/BMusic
- Kinesiology BSc/BEd
- Counselling Psychology
- School/Applied Child Psychology
- Educational Psychology

== Notable people ==
- Ella Blaylock Atherton (1860–1933), physician
