= Academy of Medicine of Toronto =

Professional and social organisation for medical doctors

The Toronto Academy of Medicine
- Established: 1907
- Address: 13 Queen's Park
- Location: Toronto, Ontario, Canada

The Academy of Medicine of Toronto was a professional and social organisation for medical doctors founded in the 19th century. It was formed in March 1907 by the amalgamation of four Toronto medical societies. The academy published its own journal, Bulletin of the Academy of Medicine, as well as speeches, articles, essays and other work by Academy members writing on medical and non-medical subjects. The academy's renowned library facility closed in 1991.

== Organisation ==
The Academy of Medicine of Toronto served as a regional library service and continuing education resource for academics and physicians in Ontario, the second most extensive in Canada after McGill's. It was maintained by its members, at no cost to the public or government. It regularly published the Bulletin of the Academy of Medicine, Toronto. In 1972, the academy housed some 60,000 monographs and 600 journals which it made available to any of its members, either locally or remotely, through an extensive inter-library loan network. The academy also accommodated educational visits from many school groups around the year.

== History ==
During the second half of the 19th century, Toronto had been home to "three independent and very antagonistic medical schools". In 1904, a stable medical faculty was established and the University of Toronto opened the Medical Building, and this allowed for the reorganization of the hospital medical staffs. At this point in time, Toronto had three medical societies: the Toronto Medical Society, founded in 1878; the Toronto Pathological Society, founded in 1889; and the Toronto Clinical Society, founded in 1892. In 1907, these three medical societies merged with the Ontario Medical Library Association to form the Academy of Medicine. It was the same year that London saw the unification of several medical societies under the Royal Society of Medicine.

The institution was first housed at 9 Queen's Park, home of the Ontario Medical Library Association. The Ontario Medical Library Association voted to dissolve on 4 June 1907, and now became the nucleus of the new academy. It contributed 117 members out of the 186 charter fellows at the founding of the academy and extended the legacy of its provincial service by providing that medical practitioners throughout Ontario had access to the academy's its facilities. The academy expanded in the subsequent decades through a series of moves and building acquisitions that allowed for further development of its educational activities.

The Academy of Medicine of Toronto thrived for many decades. However, survival became increasingly difficult for medical clubs and libraries not affiliated with larger institutions (such as universities).

In 1977, the Ontario Labour Relations Board ordered the Academy of Medicine to compensate a union and its former striking employees for its union-busting activities, closing its telephone answering service for doctors rather than deal with the Communication Workers of Canada.

In the 1980s, the Academy of Medicine ran into debt troubles. In 1981, The Globe and Mail reported that the academy may have to sell its collection of rare books. In 1984, it was further reported that the academy was obliged to sell Osler Hall, which housed its auditorium.

The academy published its Bulletin between 1927 (v.1) and 1990 (v.58). It took a hiatus between the years 1980–1989.

After closure of the library facility in 1991, its collections were donated to the Toronto Hospital in June 1992. A sizeable collection from the Academy of Medicine was also acquired by the Thomas Fisher Rare Book Library at the University of Toronto. On 5 July 1996, ownership of the collection passed from the academy to the hospital. The hospital retained part of the collection, donated yet other parts, and disposed of the remainders. As of 2007, the academy existed only virtually and offered occasional lectures.
