= Blaylock Atherton =

American politician

President of the New Hampshire Senate
- In office 1951–1952

Member of the New Hampshire House of Representatives
- In office 1937–1939, 1939–1943, 1945–1948

Member of the New Hampshire Senate
- Constituency: 12th district

Personal details
- Born: October 6, 1900 Nashua, New Hampshire, U.S.
- Died: March 16, 1963 (aged 62) Nashua, New Hampshire, U.S.
- Resting place: Edgewood Cemetery, Nashua
- Party: Republican
- Spouse: Katherine E. Bremner (m. 1924)
- Children: 3
- Education: Dartmouth College (attended); Massachusetts Institute of Technology (BS)
- Occupation: Politician; insurance agent

Blaylock Atherton (1900–1963) was an American politician from Nashua, New Hampshire. He was elected to the New Hampshire House of Representatives in 1937 and 1939. He then served as a state senator for the twelfth district in the New Hampshire Senate, returning to the House of Representatives for two more terms.

== Early life ==
Atherton was born on October 6, 1900, in Nashua, the son of Captain Henry B. Atherton (1835-1906) and Ella Blaylock Atherton M.D. (1860-1933. He is a direct descendant of James Atherton, one of the First Settlers of New England; who arrived in Dorchester, Massachusetts, in the 1630s.

His father was 65 years old at the time of his birth, and had been severely wounded in the Peninsula campaign of the American Civil War. Although his father was an attorney, he was also editor-in-chief of The Telegraph of Nashua. His father died when Blaylock was just six years old.

He had one full sibling, Ives Atherton, and four half siblings, including Henry F. Atherton. He grew up in the Atherton family home on Fairmount Street in Nashua.

Atherton was educated in Nashua public schools. He attended Dartmouth College (class of 1922), as did his father. He graduated from the Massachusetts Institute of Technology in 1924 with a degree in engineering administration.

== Career ==
Atherton was a Republican politician who served as a member of New Hampshire State House of Representatives, representing Nashua's 1st Ward, between 1937 and 1943. He served an additional term from 1945 to 1948. Between those two terms he was a member of New Hampshire's state senate. He was chairman of the house appropriations committee in 1949, and a member of the senate ways and means committee.

In 1949 Atherton was a candidate for the 1950 senate for New Hampshire's 12th State Senate district. He went on to serve as president of the state senate from 1951 to 1952; and as acting governor for New Hampshire for several months during that same term in office, whilst Governor Sherman Adams campaigned for Dwight D. Eisenhower across the country in a leave of absence, following a successful Eisenhower campaign in the New Hampshire primary. He had been a GOP candidate during 1951 for the gubernatorial race, but withdrew in July the following year. During his time as Acting Governor, he implemented a ban on smoking in woodland.

Atherton also served on the Public Utilities Commission and Nashua Board of Education.

Atherton owned and operated an insurance agency at 142 Main Street, Nashua, from 1926 until his death in 1963. He had been inspired by his father's legacy of legislating insurance in New Hampshire.

== Memberships ==
He was a member of the Scottish Rite masons, the Nashua Country Club, and a former president and Vice President of the NH State Society and the Sons of the American Revolution.

== Personal ==
He married Katherine E. Bremner (1901-1980) in Wilton, New Hampshire, on September 6, 1924. His wife was a graduate of Gibbs College of Boston and became a director of the Women's Insurance League. They had three daughters.

He was a Mason and a past commander in Nashua, New Hampshire and a director of the Nashua Rotary Club.

Atherton died on March 16, 1963, and is buried in Edgewood Cemetery, Nashua.
