= Henry Valpey Atherton =

American lawyer

Henry Valpey Atherton (May 6, 1911 – July 31, 1967), was an American lawyer, and part of the prosecution counsel at the Nuremberg Trials in 1946. He was a member of the Massachusetts Bar Association and the Boston Bar Association.

== Early life ==
Atherton was born into a wealthy and influential Boston family on May 6, 1911, the son of Percy Arad Atherton (1877–1940) and Louise Newhall Valpey. He followed the same profession as his father, who had engaged in a law practice for 37 years specializing in cases before the federal courts.

Atherton was a graduate of Harvard University and Harvard Law School.

== Career ==
Atherton worked for Federal Judge Hugh Dean McLellan who had been nominated by President Herbert Hoover on January 18, 1932, to a seat on the United States District Court for the District of Massachusetts vacated by Judge James Madison Morton Jr. McLellan was confirmed by the United States Senate on February 3, 1932. McLellan resigned on September 30, 1941. Thereafter, Atherton went onto become an associate of the Boston law firm “Herrick, Smith, Donald, Farley and Ketchum” in 1941.

During World War II, he served with the Judge Advocate General's Corps of the U.S. Army, with the rank of Lieutenant.

He served as a prosecutor at the Nuremberg war crimes trial under Justice Robert H. Jackson between September 30 and October 1, 1946.

At the Nuremberg trials, Arthur Seyss-Inquart was found guilty of war crimes and crimes against humanity, sentenced to death, and executed.

At the end of World War II, Atherton returned to law firm of Herrick, Smith, Donald, Farley and Ketchum, and worked as an associate, until his untimely death in 1967.

== Other interests ==
Atherton was clerk of the Arlington Street Church of Boston and its Prudential Committee. He was president of the Young People's Religious League; treasurer of the Unitarian Service Pension Society, and a member of the board of the Star Island Corporation.

He was also a member of the Harvard Musical Association.

== Personal ==
He married Barbara Beach (1917–2007). They had a son, Charles; two daughters, Margaret and Frances.

== Death ==
Atherton died at Massachusetts General Hospital, at the age of 56, on July 31, 1967. A memorial service was held on Aug 3, 1967 at Arlington Street Church in Boston. His wife Barbara died in 2007.

== Ancestry ==
Atherton is a direct descendant of James Atherton, one of the First Settlers of New England; who arrived in Dorchester, Massachusetts in the 1630s. His paternal great-great-great-great-grandfather was born c. 1624 in Lancashire, England, emigrated to America in the 1630s and was one of the founders of Lancaster, Massachusetts. He was buried in Sherborn, Massachusetts in 1710.
