= Henry F. Atherton =

American businessman

Henry Francis Atherton (August 3, 1883 – February 10, 1949) was an American business executive, lawyer and Harvard alumnus. He was a member of the New York State Bar Association from 1909.

== Early life and education ==
Atherton was born on August 3, 1883, in Nashua, New Hampshire, the son of Captain Henry B. Atherton (1835–1906) and Abbie Louise Armington (1840–1896) of Ludlow, Vermont. His father was 48 years old at the time of his birth, and had been severely wounded in the Peninsula campaign of the American Civil War. Although his father was an attorney, he was also editor-in-chief of The Telegraph of Nashua.

Atherton lost his parents whilst young. His mother died when he was just 12 years old. By the age of 23 his father had died. His widowed father remarried in 1898 to a celebrated British born physician, Ella Blaylock Atherton M. D. (1860–1933). Atherton had two half siblings, Blaycock and Ives.

He was educated in local schools in Nashua. His correspondence with his father whilst attending Harvard (1902–1906), forms part of the Henry B Atherton papers in Dartmouth College.

He received an A.B. degree from Harvard in 1905. Whilst he was studying law at Harvard, his father died of pneumonia at the family home in Fairmount Heights, Nashua. In 1908 he received his LL. B. degree from Harvard Law School. He practiced law until 1919.

== Career ==
Atherton went to work for Jacob F. Schoellkopf Jr., an American business executive and industrialist, as a legal representative.

After a period of war service in the United States Army (1917–1919), he joined the National Aniline & Chemical Company (est. 1917) and became a Secretary within the company in 1919. The 1920 merger with four other chemical companies: Barrett Paving Materials (est. 1852), General Chemical Company (est. 1899), Semet-Solvay Company (est. 1895), and the Solvay Process Company (est. 1881) led to the formation of the Allied Chemical and Dye Corporation. He served as its president from 1934 to 1946. He was elected as chairman of the Board of Allied Chemical & Dye Corporation in 1935; a position he held right up to his untimely death whilst on vacation in Florida in 1949.

== Awards and recognition ==
He was a member of the chemistry visiting committee of the Board of Overseers of Harvard University.

Atherton received a certificate of appreciation from the US Secretary of War in 1945 for his contributory role

“in the establishment of important policies leading to an adequate supply of military chemicals”

== Personal ==
He married Madeline Bicker Wesson, the daughter of Walter Herbert Wesson (1850–1921), at her parents home in Crescent Hill, Springfield, Massachusetts on February 9, 1913. The Boston Globe reported that the wedding, which was held inside the Wesson's home was attended by over 400 people. Madeline was the granddaughter of Daniel B. Wesson, a co-founder of the firearms manufacturer Smith & Wesson.

He traveled to Liverpool with work in 1914 and his recorded address was listed as Syosset on Long Island. He served in the United States Army during World War I as a captain, part of the time on an overseas assignment working in ordinance (1917–1919).

Upon his return to New York, he appointed the New York architect, James O’Connor to design a home on land he owned near Laurel Hollow, in the vicinity of Oyster Bay, Long Island. His home became known as the Henry Francis Atherton Estate, and is located in Upper Brookville, New York.

Atherton was a successful businessman, and very much part of New York High Society. The New York Times reported on November 20, 1938, that

“the popularity of Chase on Foot Grows on Long Island; Buckram Beagles Will Hold Three-Hour Run Today; Field to Start From Henry F. Atherton Estate in Brookville to Follow Pack Led by Marion Dillon”

The Henry F. Atherton Estate and the neighboring landowners also hosted the annual steeplechase hunt.

As a member of Long Island Society, he entertained the rich and powerful of New York. Among his guests were exiled European royals such as Charlotte, Grand Duchess of Luxembourg, during World War II. He was a member of the Harvard Club of New York, the Knickerbocker Club, the Down Town Association of New York, the Racquet and Tennis Club and the Piping Rock Club in Locust Valley, Long Island.

Atherton died of a heart attack at the age of 65 in Boca Grande, Florida, on February 10, 1949. He is buried at the Memorial Cemetery of Saint John's Church, Laurel Hollow in Nassau County, New York. His widow, Madeline died in 1962.

=== Children of Henry F Atherton and Madeline Wesson ===
- Henry F. Atherton Jr. (1914–1970) was initially engaged to wed Elizabeth Clark Rochester. However the wedding was called off and he went on to marry Eileen Chalmers. His second wife was Elizabeth R. Vickers, whom he married at the age of 46 in 1960. He resided in Warrenton, Virginia, and Greenville, Maine.
- Walter H Atherton (1916–1937) was a Harvard senior at the time of his death at the age of 21. He was found shot in the head in his bedroom the day before he was to return to Harvard for his final year of school in an apparent suicide. None of the staff present in the home during the tragedy heard the gunshot.

=== Notable relatives ===
Atherton Avenue, Nashua is named in honor of his stepmother Ella Blayclock Atherton; the first woman to perform abdominal surgery in New Hampshire. She was a member of the New Hampshire woman's suffrage movement, and according to “Woman's Who's Who in America 1915 by John W. Leonard, her recreational hobby was motoring.

His half-brother, Blaylock Atherton (1900–1963), was elected to the New Hampshire State House of Representatives: Nashua 1st Ward (1937–43) and (1945–1948), representing the Republican Party. He was a member of New Hampshire State Senate (1943–1945).

== Ancestry ==
Atherton is a direct descendant of James Atherton, one of the First Settlers of New England; who arrived in Dorchester, Massachusetts in the 1630s. His paternal great-great-great-great-grandfather was born c. 1624 in Lancashire, England, emigrated to America in the 1630s and was one of the founders of Lancaster, Massachusetts. He was buried in Sherborn, Massachusetts, in 1710.

His paternal mother was a cousin of Bishop Levi Silliman Ives and U.S. District Judge Nathan K. Hall. He was also a distant relative, through his paternal grandmother, of Samuel Morse, inventor of the Morse code, and Chancellor James Kent.
