= Harry Fulton McLeod =

Canadian politician (1871–1921)

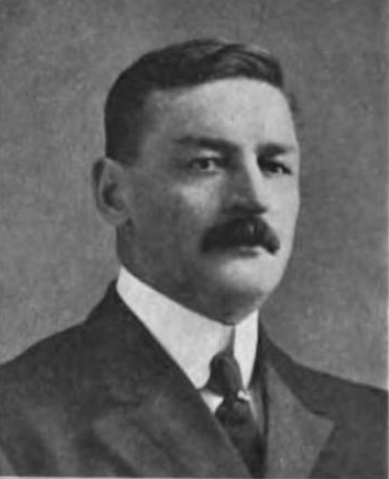

Member of the House of Commons of Canada
- In office 1913 – January 7, 1921
- Constituency: York—Sunbury

Member of the Legislative Assembly of New Brunswick
- In office 1908–1913
- Constituency: York County

Mayor of Fredericton
- In office 1907–1908

Personal details
- Born: September 14, 1871; Fredericton, New Brunswick
- Died: January 7, 1921 (aged 49); Fredericton, New Brunswick
- Political party: Conservative; Unionist
- Spouse: Ina F. Mercereau (m. 1908)
- Occupation: Lawyer, politician

Harry Fulton McLeod (September 14, 1871 – January 7, 1921) was a Canadian lawyer and political figure in New Brunswick, Canada. He represented York County in the Legislative Assembly of New Brunswick from 1908 to 1913. Then he represented York and York—Sunbury in the House of Commons of Canada from 1913 to 1921 as a Conservative and later as a Unionist member.

== Biography ==
McLeod was born in Fredericton, New Brunswick on September 14, 1871. He served as mayor of Fredericton from 1907 to 1908. He was a lieutenant colonel in the Canadian Expeditionary Force during World War I.

He married Ina F. Mercereau in December 1908.

He died in office, at his home in Fredericton, on January 7, 1921.

== Electoral history ==
1917 Canadian federal election: Fredericton
Party	Candidate	Votes	%
Government (Unionist)	Harry Fulton McLeod	6,957	69.22
Liberal	Nelson Brown	3,093	30.78
Total valid votes		10,050	100.00
