= James Atherton (settler) =

Early settler in New England

- Born: 1624; Wigan, Lancashire, Kingdom of England
- Died: August 6, 1710 (aged 85–86); Sherborn, Massachusetts Bay Colony
- Occupation: planter
- Spouse: Hannah
- Children: James, Hannah, Joshua, Hannah (2nd), Mary, Elizabeth, Deborah, and Joseph
- Relatives: Humphrey Atherton

James Atherton (c. 1624–1710) was an early settler and one of the founders of Lancaster, Massachusetts. He emigrated to the New England Colonies from the parish of Wigan, Lancashire, England, in 1635.

== Emigration ==
The Massachusetts Bay Colony had been founded by the owners of the Massachusetts Bay Company, which included investors in the failed Dorchester Company which had established a short-lived settlement on Cape Ann in 1623. The colony began in 1628 and was the company's second attempt at colonization. It was successful, with about 20,000 people migrating to New England in the 1630s. Atherton was part of this first wave of Puritan migration to New England (1620–1640). Atherton was a child emigrant.

Biographers agree that he travelled from Lancashire to Bristol and then sailed on the James, in the company of the Reverend Richard Mather; a minister from his home town and Humphrey Atherton, an elder relative (but not a sibling). The latter would later become the mayor general of the Massachusetts Bay Colony troops.

On June 4, 1635, he set sail for the New World aboard the ship James. However, quoting another source, it sailed days earlier;

“...the James left King's Road in Bristol on 23 May 1635 with her master, John Taylor, along with the Angel Gabriel, the Elizabeth (the Bess), the Mary and the Diligence. The James and the Angel Gabriel stayed together while the three faster and smaller boats went on to Newfoundland. The Angel was wrecked off the coast of Maine, but the James made it into Boston, torn and shredded”.

As the ship James approached New England, a hurricane struck and it was forced to ride it out just off the coast of modern-day Hampton, New Hampshire. According to the ship's log and the Journal of Richard Mather. 1635: His life and death. 1670, the following was recorded;

At this moment,... their lives were given up for lost; but then, in an instant of time, God turned the wind about, which carried them from the rocks of death before their eyes. ...her sails rent in sunder, and split in pieces, as if they had been rotten ragges... (ibid, p.29.)

They tried to stand down during the storm just outside the Isles of Shoals, but lost all three anchors, as no canvas or rope would hold, but on August 17, 1635, torn to pieces, and with not one death, all one hundred plus passengers of the James managed to make it to Boston Harbor. (ibid, p.34.)

Atherton arrived in Boston on August 17, 1635, after weathering the Great Colonial Hurricane of 1635.

== Arrival in Massachusetts Bay Colony ==
He and his elder kinsman Humphrey Atherton, resided in Dorchester. He worked as a tanner.

=== Move to Lancaster ===
Atherton having become of age in Dorchester, was one of the earliest settlers of Lancaster, Massachusetts, accompanying John Prescott, who had obtained rights to settle in an area then known as Nashaway Plantation.

Atherton's lot was situated on Neck Road. The precise time of early settlers arriving in Lancaster is not known. Initial lots of land had been allocated to Richard Linton, Lawrence Waters and John Ball, prior to the arrival c.1643 of Atherton and his peers; the Prescott's and the Sawyer's. Over the next seven years very little was done to advance the settlement of the Nashaway plantation.

Atherton went on to become one of the founders of Lancaster at the time of its incorporation. He is listed as an official planter as of January 1653.

Once more than nine families had settled, the planters petitioned the general court to be incorporated as a town, which was subsequently granted on May 18, 1653. The settlement was named Lancaster. It was likely chosen because of the ancestral connection Atherton shared with his neighbors, the Prescott's and Houghton's.

The first town meeting on record was held in the summer of 1654, once the petition was granted. At the next meeting it was voted not to take into the town above thirty-five families, and the names of the following 22 townsmen that approved this, were:

Edward Breek, Mr. Joseph Rowlandson (minister), John Prescott, William Kerley, Ralph Houghton, Thomas Sawyer, John Whitcomb, John Whitcomb, jr., Richard Linton, John Johnson, John Moore, William Lewis, John Lewis, Thomas James, Edmund Parker, James Atherton, Henry Kerley, Richard Smith, William Kerley, jr., John Smith, Lawrence Waters and John White

In 1659 the town of Lancaster revoked the order limiting the settlers to 35, which followed a rapid increase in the population.

== Lancaster raid ==
It is unknown when Atherton left Lancaster for Milton, which at the time was part of Dorchester. Lancaster was still an isolated village on February 10, 1676, when a force of 1,500 Wampanoag, Nipmuc, and Narragansett Indians carried out a dawn attack, in what would become known as the Lancaster raid.

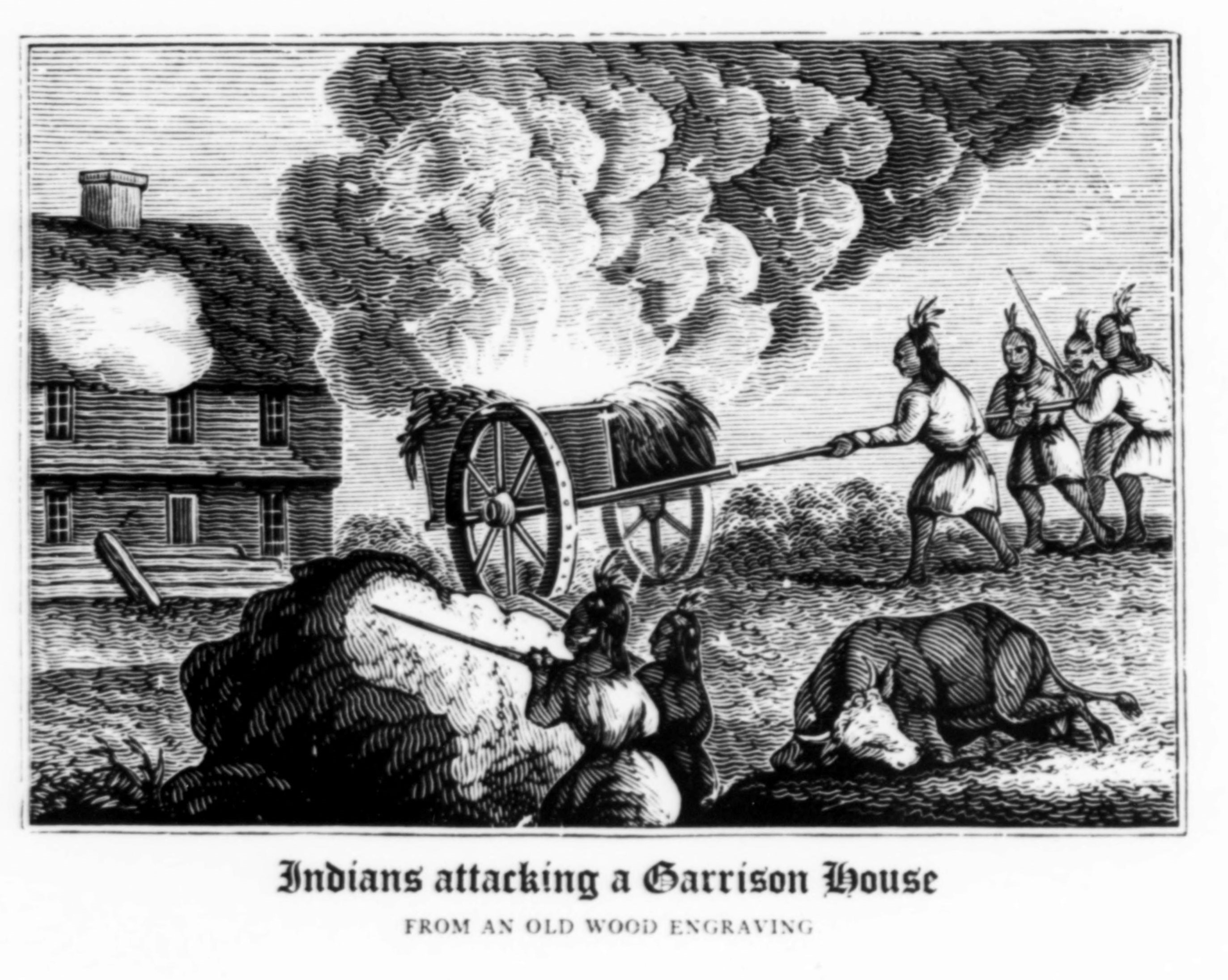

Fortified garrison houses were set on fire, including the home of Rev. Joseph Rowlandson and 30 people killed. Most houses were destroyed and Mary Rowlandson and some of her children were taken hostage. This resulted in the abandonment of the settlement by most of the inhabitants who left by way of carts sent by the General Court during March 1676.

== Personal life ==
He married Hannah (died 1713) in Lancaster c.1653. They had eight children: James, Hannah, Joshua, Hannah (2nd), Mary, Elizabeth, Deborah and Joseph.

His youngest son Joseph, served in Sir William Phips’ unsuccessful expedition against the French in Quebec. In 1690 he was a member of Captain John Withington's Company of Dorchester, along with his neighbor, Benjamin Willard, as part of a 2000 strong militia. After a victory in the Battle of Port Royal during May 1690, they departed Boston in August for Quebec. Joseph died during, or in the aftermath of Battle of Quebec.

According to some sources he chose to convey his lands in Lancaster to his eldest son, James (a weaver) in 1698.

However, in 1704, both he and his two surviving sons, James and Joshua were ordered to strengthen their garrisons in Lancaster.

== Ancestry ==
He was related to Major General Humphrey Atherton, who up until his death in 1661 was the most powerful military leader in the colony. It was Humphrey's father who owned land in the parish of Wigan. Humphrey sat on the General Court of the Massachusetts Bay Colony and was instrumental in getting the settlement of Lancaster incorporated as a town in 1652.

=== Atherton Bridge, Massachusetts ===
The sign commemorating Atherton Bridge states:

ATHERTON BRIDGE There has been a bridge at this location since early settlement. It is named for James Atherton, one of the signers of the petition for incorporation of the town in 1652. The 1794 map lists the bridge as 90 feet long on a county way Lancaster’s first iron bridge was placed here in 1870.

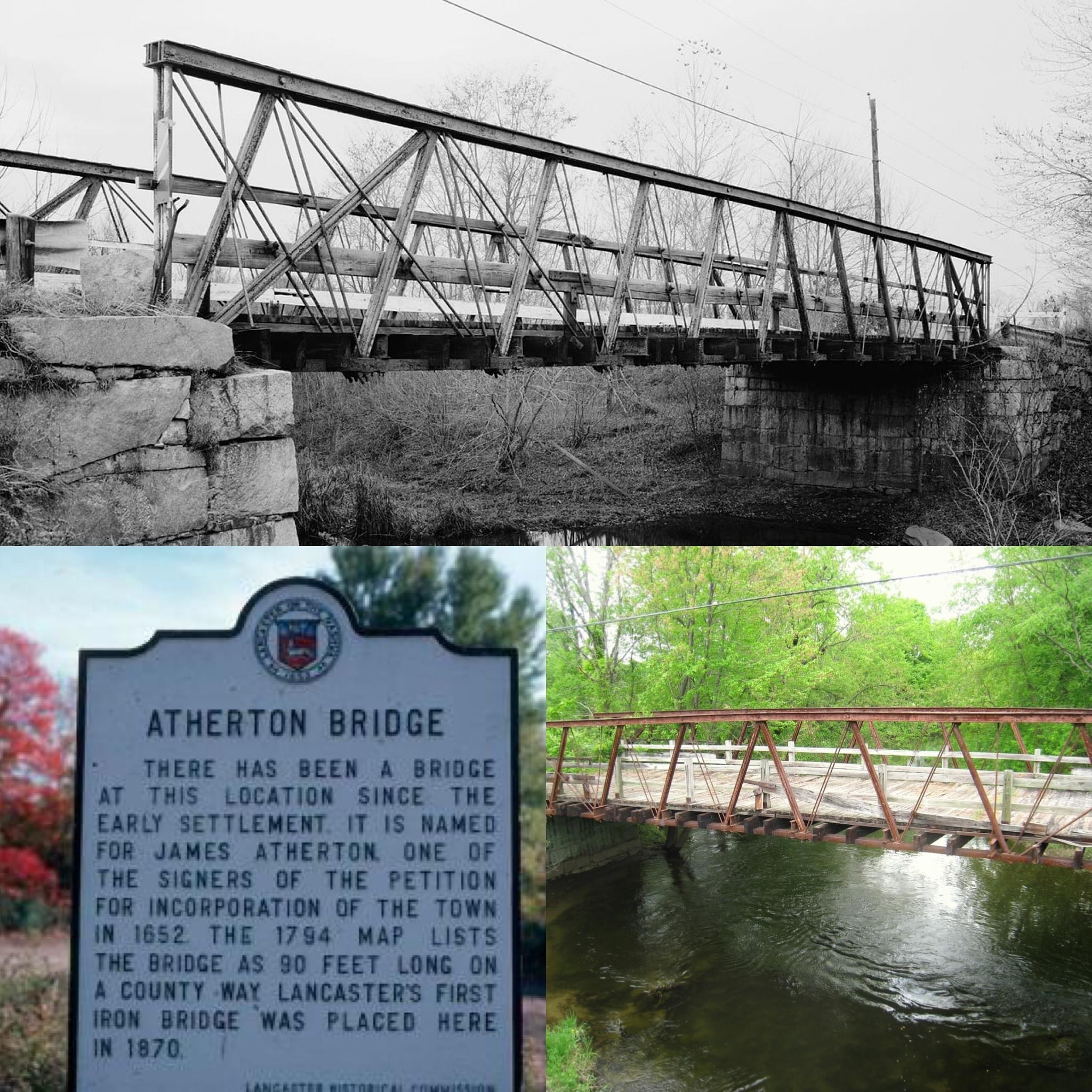

== Death ==
Atherton died in Sherborn, Massachusetts, on August 6, 1710, at the home of his only surviving daughter, Deborah, wife of Captain Samuel Bullard.

He is buried at the Old South Cemetery in Sherborn. Probate occurred a few months after. His wife died three years later.

== Notable descendants ==
- Lizzie Aiken (1817–1906), a Union Army Civil War nurse
- Alfred Atherton (1921–2002), former U.S. Ambassador to Egypt
- Alfred Bennison Atherton (1843–1921), Canadian physician
- Blaylock Atherton (1900–1963), a 20th-century politician from New Hampshire
- Charles G. Atherton (1804–1853), an American politician and lawyer from New Hampshire
- Charles Henry Atherton (1932–2005), FAIA, was an American architect and former secretary of the U.S. Commission of Fine Arts from 1960 to 2004
- Charles Humphrey Atherton (1773–1853), an American Federalist politician, banker and a distinguished attorney from New Hampshire.
- Charlie Atherton (1874–1935), a Major League Baseball third baseman. Nicknamed "Prexy"
- Cornelius Atherton (1737–1809), an iron manufacturer, gunmaker for the American Revolutionary War and an inventor
- Faxon Atherton (1815–1877), businessman, trader and landowner in Chile; and then in San Mateo County, California
- Frank Peabody Atherton (1868-1911), composer and music instructor
- George Washington Atherton (1837–1906), soldier and educator. He was president of the Pennsylvania State University
- Henry B. Atherton (1835–1906), a soldier in the American Civil War from Vermont, a lawyer and state legislator for New Hampshire during the late 19th century.
- Henry F. Atherton (1883–1949), American business executive, Lawyer and Harvard Alumni. Member of the New York State Bar Association from 1909.
- Henry Valpey Atherton (1911–1967), a prosecutor at the Nuremberg Trials
- Joshua Atherton (1737–1809), a lawyer and early anti-slavery campaigner in Massachusetts and New Hampshire.
- Joseph Ballard Atherton (1837–1903), 19th century businessman
- Peter Atherton (1704–1764), an 18th-century colonial leader from Massachusetts
- Simon Atherton (1803–1888), was an early American Shaker, who became highly successful on behalf of his own community, in selling herbs in Boston
- Thomas H. Atherton (1884–1978), an American architect. He studied at Princeton and MIT. He co-designed the Pennsylvania WWI war memorial in France
- Warren Atherton (1891 – 1976), an American attorney who served as the National Commander of The American Legion from 1943 to 1944
- William Atherton (born 1947), actor
- Seth Boyden (1788–1870), inventor
- Uriah Atherton Boyden (1804–1879), inventor from Foxborough, Massachusetts best known for the development of the Boyden Turbine
- Henry Atherton Frost (1883–1952), an architect and instructor at Harvard University
- Alfred S. Hartwell (1836–1912), lawyer and American Civil War soldier, who then had another career as cabinet minister and judge in the Kingdom of Hawaii
- Charles Atherton Hartwell, mustered as a private in he 7th New York State Militia regiment, He was brevetted Brigadier General, US Volunteers on December 2, 1865, for "gallant and meritorious services during the war". He remained in the Regular Army after the end of the conflict, dying while on active duty in Castroville, Texas in 1876 while at the rank of captain.
