= Margaret Amelia Corlis =

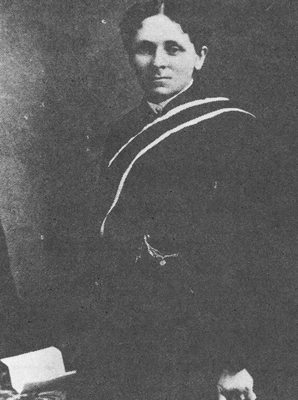
- Dr Corlis
- Born: Margaret Amelia Walker c. 1840; Townsend
- Died: January 6, 1925; Grafton
- Education: Queens University, Kingston
- Occupation: doctor
- Known for: early female medical graduate
- Spouse: Josiah Corlis
- Children: a daughter and three sons.

Margaret Amelia Corlis (c., 1840 – January 6, 1925) was a Canadian-born Australian medical practitioner. She was one of the first women to graduate as a doctor at Queens University, Kingston and she was considered the first woman doctor to practice in Western Australia - travelling on a bitey camel.

== Life ==
Margaret Amelia Walker was born in Ontario in about 1840 at Townsend. In 1862 she and Josiah Corlis were married. He came from the same town as her and he was a Baptist minister. However, he wanted to be a doctor so they took in medical students in Montreal and the rents enabled him to study again. In 1869, he became a qualified physician at McGill University.

They moved to Ontario where they had a chemist shop; Josiah practised at the hospital, and they raised four children. Sadly, their only daughter died from diphtheria. In 1881, she decided to be one of the first women to study medicine in Canada. She and her husband hired a housekeeper and in 1881 she enrolled in the medical school at Queens University, Kingston, Ontario. She graduated in 1885 as one of their first five female graduates.

In 1891, they moved to Australia where two of her sons followed their parents example and became qualified doctors. The other son joined them later as he qualified as a vet in Canada. She was the second woman to practise in Sydney when she had a medical practise in Elizabeth Street, before she joined her husband to practise in Bellingen.

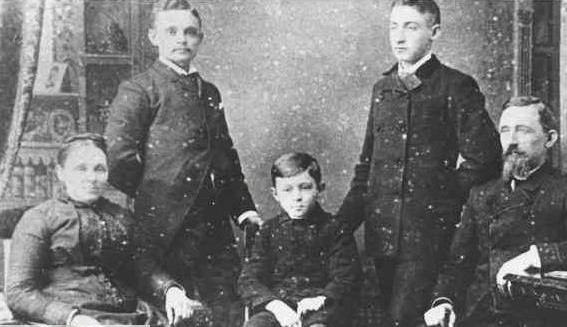
Five doctors - a vet and four physicians - Dr Margaret Corlis, her sons and husband

In 1895 she moved to Coolgardie to join her husband. He was there after he helped to deal with a typhoid epidemic. She was the first woman doctor to register in Western Australia. They were both employed at the canvas hospital there and she gained bite marks from her camel. which She and the camel used to perform house visits that took her away from home for a week accompanied by the camel's Afghan attendant.

She and her husband started to retire in 1903 when they returned to New South Wales from where they went to Canada on holiday. She lived with her son, Dr. Charles C. Corlis, in Bangalow in 1922 after her husband died. She was blind. She was buried there after she died on 6 January 1925 at Grafton where her son Dr. Philip E. Corlis lived. Her third son Dr. W. S. Corlis was in New York.
