= Alexander Gibson (politician) =

Canadian politician

Alexander Gibson, Jr. (December 15, 1852 – April 19, 1920) was a businessman and political figure in New Brunswick, Canada. He represented York County in the Legislative Assembly of New Brunswick from 1899 to 1900 as a Liberal and represented York in the House of Commons of Canada from 1900 to 1904 as a Liberal member.

He was born in Fredericton, New Brunswick, the son of Alexander Gibson and Mary Ann Robinson. He resigned his seat in the provincial assembly to run for a federal seat in 1900. Gibson was unsuccessful in a bid for reelection to the federal parliament in 1904, and again in 1907. He served as mayor of Marysville, a town founded by his father and now part of Fredericton.
