= Joshua Atherton =

American anti-slavery campaigner

Joshua Atherton (June 20, 1737 – April 3, 1809), was an American lawyer, politician, and anti-slavery advocate who served as Attorney General of New Hampshire. A prominent Anti-Federalist during the ratification debates over the United States Constitution, he is best known for his opposition to constitutional provisions protecting the Atlantic slave trade and for his early public criticism of slavery. He served as Attorney General of New Hampshire. In later years he was also commissioner for the United States direct tax.

Born in Massachusetts and educated at Harvard College, Atherton practiced law in both Massachusetts and New Hampshire before entering public service. During and after the American Revolution, he held a number of local and state offices, including Register of Probate, state senator, justice of the peace, and attorney general. He also participated in several New Hampshire constitutional conventions and was active in debates concerning civil liberties, state government, and constitutional reform.

As a delegate to New Hampshire’s ratifying convention in 1788, Atherton argued against adoption of the proposed federal Constitution without amendments. His most notable speech condemned the continuation of the slave trade under Article I, Section 9, describing slavery as a moral wrong and objecting to any constitutional recognition of the practice. Although New Hampshire ultimately ratified the Constitution, Atherton’s remarks have been cited by historians as an early anti-slavery statement in the founding era.

Atherton remained active in public affairs throughout the 1790s, serving in the New Hampshire Senate and as the state’s attorney general. He retired from public life in the early nineteenth century and died in Amherst, New Hampshire, in 1809.

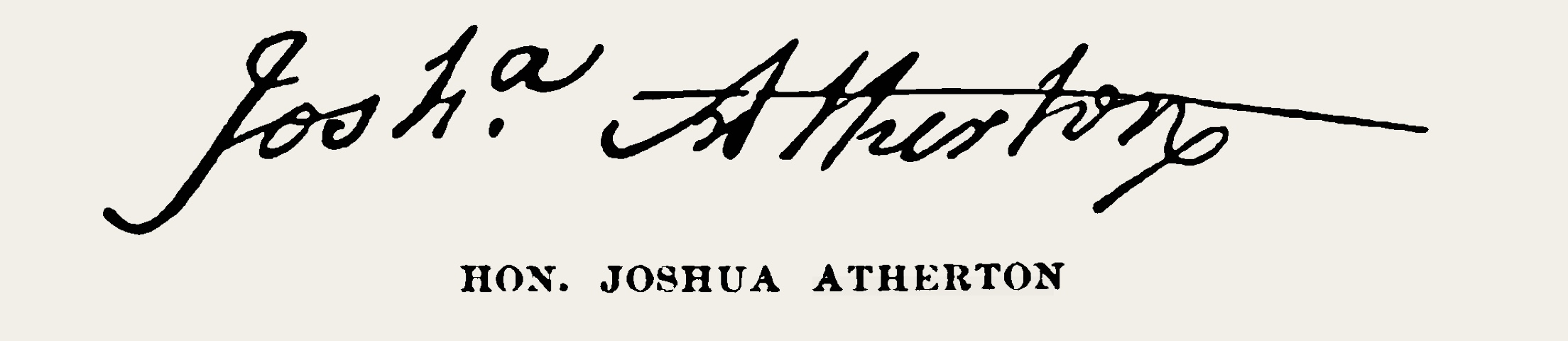
Signature of Joshua Atherton, lawyer and politician

== Early life and education ==
Joshua Atherton was the son of Colonel Peter Atherton and Experience Wright. Family and local historical sources trace the family to his grandfather Joshua Atherton (1656–1721), who reportedly served in King Philip's War and later settled in the Lancaster–Still River area of Massachusetts.

He was raised in Worcester County, Massachusetts, the son of Colonel Peter Atherton, a farmer, blacksmith, magistrate, and local political figure. He received a local education before attending Harvard College, where he graduated in 1762. He was a contemporary of Francis Dana and Elbridge Gerry. He subsequently studied law under James Putnam. His brother, Israel Atherton, also attended Harvard and later pursued a medical career.

== Career ==
After completing his legal training under James Putnam and gaining admission to the Massachusetts bar, Atherton practiced law in Petersham, before relocating to the Province of New Hampshire. He established a practice in Merrimack and later settled in Amherst, where he combined legal work with farming. In 1773 he was appointed Register of Probate for Hillsborough County. Contemporary and later sources indicate that several future lawyers and public figures, including William Gordon, his future son in law, William Coleman and William Plumer, received legal instruction under his supervision.

=== The onset of the American Revolution ===
Atherton became a target of suspicion because of his loyalist sympathies, although his support for the British cause appears to have been limited. He was known to associate with prominent Loyalists and often faced hostility from local patriots. According to his memoirs, he initially doubted that the colonial resistance movement could succeed. Having developed close relationships with British officials and serving in legal and public offices, he favored maintaining the existing political order.

Atherton viewed many revolutionary actions as unlawful and declined to participate in Patriot activities, fearing that civil unrest would undermine the rule of law. Like many colonists with Loyalist leanings, he faced the difficult choice of whether to remain in his community or leave. He appears to have stayed, at least in part, for economic reasons. As revolutionary sentiment intensified, both he and his family were subjected to public scrutiny and periodic harassment. He was disarmed, had his rifle confiscated, and was detained on several occasions by the local committee of safety because of his political views. Crowds frequently gathered outside his home, urging him to leave town and at times forcing their way onto his property.

Despite these pressures, Atherton believed that order would eventually be restored. Throughout his adult life he remained politically active, though his views often placed him at odds with many of his neighbors. Opposition to his positions became so intense that his barns were reportedly burned and his effigy publicly destroyed.

New Hampshire was one of the thirteen colonies that rebelled against British rule during the American Revolution. Although Atherton initially opposed certain British policies, he refused to join the local Sons of Liberty, a secret organization formed to advance colonial rights and resist British taxation. He subsequently attempted to remain neutral, believing that the colonies were unlikely to prevail in a war against Great Britain. His stance proved unpopular, and in 1777 he was arrested and imprisoned in nearby Exeter, New Hampshire. He was removed from his positions as register of probate and justice of the peace and returned to farming. (Note: According to the Bar Association of the State of New Hampshire c.(1905), "a writ was issued, in 1777, for his arrest, but it appears he was not arrested.")

After taking an oath of allegiance to the state of New Hampshire in 1779, Atherton resumed practicing law. In 1782, he chaired the Amherst committee responsible for helping draft a state constitution. The following year, as a delegate to the New Hampshire constitutional convention, he participated in revising state laws, advocated for a bill of rights, and worked to resolve disputes involving former Loyalist land claims. He later served as a state senator in 1793.

=== Opposition to the Constitution and Anti-Slavery Speech ===
In 1787, Atherton was elected as a delegate to the New Hampshire convention convened to consider ratification of the proposed United States Constitution. He opposed ratification unless amendments were adopted, arguing that the document was inadequately drafted and lacked sufficient protections for individual liberties. Atherton strongly advocated for a bill of rights to safeguard personal freedoms and also defended the authority of local and state governments against what he viewed as excessive centralization of power.

In February 1788, Atherton delivered one of the most notable speeches of the New Hampshire ratifying convention, focusing on Article I, Section 9, Clause 1 of the proposed Constitution, which restricted Congress from prohibiting the importation of enslaved persons before 1808.

Condemning the slave trade in moral terms, he argued that the provision implicated all Americans in what he described as an "abominable" practice and failed to provide for its immediate abolition. He declared that New Hampshire should not support ratification while the Constitution permitted the continuation of such a trade.

Atherton went on to denounce slavery itself, offering a vivid account of the suffering endured by enslaved people and criticizing the institution as incompatible with the principles of liberty for which the American Revolution had been fought. His remarks below reflected some of the strongest anti-slavery sentiments expressed during the New Hampshire ratification debates and underscored the tension between the Constitution’s compromises and the ideals of individual rights and human freedom:

Parents are taken, and children left; or possibly they may be so fortunate as to have a whole family taken and carried off together by these relentless robbers. What must be their feelings in the hands of their new and arbitrary masters? Dragged at once from every thing they held dear to them—stripped of every comfort of life, like beasts of prey—they are hurried on a loathsome and distressing voyage to the coast of Africa, or some other quarter of the globe, where the greatest price may await them; and here, if any thing can be added to their miseries, comes on the heart-breaking scene! A parent is sold to one, a son to another, and a daughter to a third! Brother is cleft from brother, sister from sister, and parents from their darling offspring! Broken with every distress that human nature can feel, and bedewed with tears of anguish, they are dragged into the last stage of depression and slavery, never, never to behold the faces of one another again!

He voted against ratification of the Constitution under instructions from his town. New Hampshire ultimately ratified the Constitution on June 21, 1788, by a vote of 57–47, becoming the ninth state to do so. John Langdon subsequently informed George Washington that New Hampshire had become the "Key Stone in the Great Arch".

Although Atherton had campaigned against ratification, he accepted the outcome, reportedly stating, "It’s adopted. Let’s try it". As a prominent anti-federalist, he later wrote to John Lamb on June 23, 1788, continuing to express his opposition to aspects of the new federal system.

=== Congressional Campaigns ===
Atherton was a candidate for election to the United States House of Representatives on several occasions. He ran in New Hampshire's 1788 and 1789 congressional elections and was also a candidate in the 1789 special election for the state's at-large congressional district. That contest was the first special election held in the history of the United States House of Representatives.

Despite his prominence in New Hampshire politics, Atherton was unsuccessful in each of these campaigns. He later sought election to the House again in 1792 and 1793 but was likewise defeated.

=== Later Public Service and Retirement ===
In 1791, Atherton was reappointed as a justice of the peace and served as a delegate to the convention in Concord that drafted a new state constitution, replacing the state’s 1783 constitution.

From 1792 to 1793, he served in the state senate. After resigning from the senate in 1793, he was elected state attorney general later that same year.

Atherton continued his public service when he was elected a commissioner of Hillsborough County in 1798. He remained active in civic affairs until 1803, when he retired because of a heart condition.

== Personal life ==
His father, Col. Peter Atherton served in the Massachusetts Colonial Militia, then seen as a political position, rising to the rank of Colonel. The law in Massachusetts required all able men to keep a firearm and volunteer in the citizen army known as the militia. His father was a Minutemen. However the militia was also mustered to fight alongside the British soldiers engaging the threats resulting from the French and Indian War during the mid-1700s. His father went onto serve in a civic role for a number of years as a member of the General Court.

Atherton married Abigail Goss, the daughter of a Congregational minister in 1765. His son, Charles Humphrey Atherton, continued his legacy practicing law, and as a politician, served as a United States representative from New Hampshire, and as a member of the New Hampshire House of Representatives during the early 1800s. His daughter Mary Frances Atherton married William Gordon, a New Hampshire politician. His daughter Catherine married David MacGregor Means (1841-1931), a lawyer and former assistant editor of The Nation. He was survived by 4 other daughters.

After his retirement, he helped establish the Franklin Society in Amherst, a library dedicated to historical events that changed the state. It was not associated with Societas Domi Pacificae which was founded several decades later.

Atherton died of heart disease on April 3, 1809 and is buried in Amherst Cemetery. Few of his personal papers survive, however his son published his memoirs.

== Descendants ==
His grandson Charles Gordon Atherton also became politically active and went on to service as a Democratic Representative and Senator from New Hampshire, and was responsible for the gag rule of December 1838, known as the "Atherton Gag", which stifled any petitions relating to slavery. His grandson's reasons were likely to have been to placate southern interests, however Atherton, as an early ardent anti-slavery campaigner would have objected to his grandson's gag rule.

His granddaughter Abby Kent-Means was an American society hostess who acted as the White House hostess during the presidency of Franklin Pierce, as Pierce's wife Jane Pierce was not well enough to carry out official duties. Abby Kent-Means was Jane Pierce's maternal aunt.

== Ancestry ==
Atherton has been incorrectly attributed as a descendant of Humphrey Atherton within certain notable sources. His great-grandfather James Atherton had arrived from England in the 1630s, and went on to serve under Captain John Whiting's Company, eventually becoming one of the founders of Lancaster. His great-grandfather on his maternal line was Samuel Wardwell, a carpenter, who was charged with witchcraft in 1692, and was hanged at Witch Hill, in Andover, Massachusetts.
