= Peter Atherton (Massachusetts politician) =

Colonial leader of 18th-century Massachusetts

- Born: 12 April 1704; Still River, Province of Massachusetts Bay
- Died: 13 June 1764 (aged 60)
- Children: Joshua and 13 others

Colonel Peter Atherton (April 12, 1704 – June 13, 1764) was a farmer, soldier and office holder with an extensive record of public service as a magistrate and as a representative for Harvard, Massachusetts, at the Great and General Court (1740–1747 and 1764).

== Early life ==
Atherton was born in 1705 at Still River in the Province of Massachusetts Bay, the youngest son of Joshua Atherton (1656–1721) and Mary Gulliver (1659–1754). His grandfather, James Atherton, arrived from England in the 1630s, and went to serve under Captain John Whiting's Company, and went on to become one of the founders of Lancaster, Massachusetts.

His father was a soldier in King Philip's War, under Captain Daniel Henchman (1623–1685) of Boston, who returned to Lancaster, Massachusetts in 1687, settling at Still River, then part of Lancaster, where he became a farmer. He built a large two-storied farm house painted red.

Atherton attended local schools in Worcester County and was tutored by the clergy. He was brought up to be a farmer and followed his father's lucrative trade as a blacksmith.

== Career ==
Atherton was a colonial leader of 18th-century Massachusetts. A blacksmith by trade, he became a successful farmer and landowner. The History of Harvard (1732–1893) by Henry S. Nourse refers to Atherton and his brothers, Benjamin, James, John, Joseph, and his cousin Simon, as the first petitioners for 11,430 acres (4,630 ha) of land west of the river in 1731. His other siblings are not listed.

He was elected as the first town clerk in Harvard's initial town meeting of July 11, 1732. It was not his skill, and he remained in that role for just eight months. He was chosen to be one of the assessors of the town of Harvard, at the same time as Eleazar Davis.

In 1740, Atherton was elected as the first representative from Harvard to the Great and General Court. He was not the first choice of the town and was selected after Deacon Joseph Fairbank declined to accept the role. Atherton went on to serve his town for seven years. He was fined twice for neglecting his duty and left office following the election of Daniel Peirce. His earlier actions did not hinder his selection again by the town two decades later, in 1764.

He also served as a Justice of the Peace from 1745 and as a magistrate in 1756.

Atherton served in the Massachusetts Colonial Militia, then seen as a political position, rising to the rank of colonel. The law in Massachusetts required all able men to keep a firearm and volunteer in the citizen army known as the militia, which would fight alongside the British soldiers engaging the threats resulting from the French and Indian War during the mid-1700s. He commanded the 1st Company of the Town of Harvard, part of the Second Regiment of the Militia of Worcester County, known as the Lancaster Regiment. During this period, it was practice for soldiers to quarter with families, a practice that was unpopular to colonists as well as within the legislative assembly. Atherton's position on this is unknown. Non-compliance eventually led to passage by the British Parliament of the Quartering Act, in order to enforce the practice in the interest of the Crown.

In the final year of his life, Atherton became a member again of the Great and General Court, representing Harvard, only to die while in office in 1764.

== Personal life ==
He married Experience Wright on June 13, 1728, the granddaughter of Samuel Wardwell, a carpenter, who was charged with witchcraft in 1692, and was hanged at Witch Hill in Andover. His mother-in-law, Mercy Wright (1673–1754), had been imprisoned at the same time as her father for witchcraft, but was later released and married John Wright.

Atherton took on his brother Benjamin's children when they were orphaned in 1740. His nephew, also Benjamin, enlisted as a lieutenant in 1755 and took part in the expulsion of the Acadians from what are now the Canadian Maritime provinces during the French and Indian War. He settled in New Brunswick.

Two of his sons attended Harvard College and were educated in law and medicine. Ten of his fourteen children preceded him in death.

His mother, Mary Gulliver, lived to the age of 95, dying in 1754. Ten years later, Atherton died on June 13, 1764, at the age of sixty, of bilious colic in Concord, Massachusetts, while a representative for his hometown at the General Court. He is buried in Harvard Center Cemetery. In 1921, a descendant transcribed his eulogy from his tombstone, which once read:

"Peter Atherton, Esquire, closed the scene of life in Concord during the sitting of the General Court of which he was a member, the thirteenth of June, seventeen sixty-four, in the sixtieth year of his age. Experience, the partner of his life, closed the scene the fourteenth of November, seventeen seventy-five, in the sixty-fourth year of her age. One solitary mansion encloses their remains. Companions in life, they have the consolation of not being separated in death, if indeed, consolation be found in the grave. This monument is erected to their memory which will ever be dear to the sons and daughters of virtue and religion."

The gravestone is likely to have been restored within the last 120 years; and as of 2021 it is still legible.

== Legacy ==
Atherton's success in his trade brought prosperity to the family. The family homestead, built by his father descended from him and onto his eldest son, Peter (1734–1784) who served as Deputy Sheriff for Harvard between 1774–1784 and married a cousin. His other two surviving sons building their homes away from Harvard. His third son, Joshua Atherton (1737–1809), studied law at Harvard College, built upon the political foundations set out by his father in the 1740s. His son, Joshua Atherton, gave input to the U.S. Bill of Rights. His tenth son, Israel Atherton (1741–1822), studied medicine at Harvard College, and built an honorable reputation as a doctor, and his daughter Mary (1753–1788), known as Mercy, married Dr Ephraim Monroe. His eldest surviving daughter, Azurbah (1730–1798), married Ephraim Willard.

Atherton's home is no longer in existence, having been destroyed by a fire in 1852.

His grandson Charles Humphrey Atherton became a widely respected politician on both a state and a federal level. His great-grandson was elected to the United States House of Representatives and the Senate. This political dynasty which lasted over 110 years ended in 1853, upon the death of his great-grandson Charles G. Atherton.

== See also ==
- List of members of the colonial Massachusetts House of Representatives
- Seven Years' War
