= Charles G. Atherton =

American politician

Charles Gordon Atherton
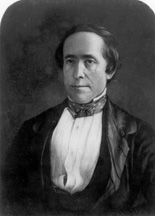

United States Senator from New Hampshire
- In office March 4, 1843 – March 3, 1849
- Preceded by: Leonard Wilcox
- Succeeded by: Moses Norris Jr.
- In office March 4, 1853 – November 15, 1853
- Preceded by: John P. Hale
- Succeeded by: Jared W. Williams

Member of the U.S. House of Representatives from New Hampshire's At-large district
- In office (seat 1); March 4, 1837 – March 3, 1843
- Preceded by: Benning M. Bean
- Succeeded by: Moses Norris Jr.

Member of the New Hampshire House of Representatives
- In office 1830
- In office 1833–1835

Personal details
- Born: July 4, 1804 Amherst, New Hampshire, U.S.
- Died: November 15, 1853 (aged 49) Manchester, New Hampshire, U.S.
- Party: Democratic
- Spouse: Ann Clark Atherton
- Profession: Politician, Lawyer

Charles Gordon Atherton (July 4, 1804 – November 15, 1853) was an American politician and lawyer from New Hampshire. He was elected to the United States House of Representatives from 1837 to 1843. He was elected to the United States Senate from 1843 to 1849 and then again in 1853. He was a Democrat.

== Early life and education ==
He was the son of Charles Humphrey Atherton and Mary Ann Toppan, the daughter of Christopher Toppan, of Hampton, New Hampshire. His mother taught him at home. Atherton received a classical education, learning Latin from a young age. He went to the academy in Lancaster, Massachusetts, under the charge of Jared Sparks from 1815 to 1817, returning home upon the death of his mother, completing his preparation for college in his father's office, under the direction of Joseph Willard. He was tutored in the classics by the inventor Samuel Abbot, and went on to study law under the tutelage of his father, a former Federalist politician and one of the most distinguished attorneys in the state. In 1818 he entered Harvard University, where he studied law, and graduated in 1822. After graduation, he was admitted to the bar in 1825 and commenced practice in Dunstable, New Hampshire.

His grandfather was Joshua Atherton, an early anti-slavery campaigner in Massachusetts. His middle name Gordon was in memory of his parents' and grandparents' family friend William Gordon. His mother, Mary, died when he was thirteen years old. He had six other siblings, many did not reach adulthood.

Like all males in New Hampshire between the ages of 18 and 45, Atherton was a member of the state militia serving in the Lafayette Riflemen 5th Regiment as a lieutenant in 1827, and as captain in 1828.

== Career ==
Atherton was a States-rights Democrat from a northern state of New England. He engaged early on in politics and identified himself with the Democratic Party, which he remained loyal to all his life.

Atherton's view on slavery was that it was constitutionally permissible and the federal government had no authority to regulate it. His grandfather had been of the opposite view, and had argued against ratifying the United States Constitution because it permitted slavery.

=== New Hampshire House of Representatives ===
Atherton was elected at the age of 26, as a member of the State House of Representatives in 1830. He was Speaker of the House from 1833 to 1835.

=== U.S House ===
Atherton is best known for his staunch stance in favor of states rights.

He was elected as a Democrat to the Twenty-fifth United States Congress and the two succeeding Congresses (March 4, 1837 – March 3, 1843) and did not seek reelection in 1842, having become a candidate for senator.

His circle of friends included Congressman Jonathan Cilley, who died in a duel in Bladensburg, Maryland in February 1838. Atherton wore a crape (a black band worn on his sleeve) for thirty days in his memory. Atherton was appointed to a committee by President Martin Van Buren to investigate the causes which led to his death. One of the committee's recommendations resulted in a law signed by President Van Buren on February 20, 1839, prohibiting the giving or accepting of challenges to duel within the District of Columbia.

==== Atherton Gag ====
He was responsible for composing the gag rule in 1838, known as the "Atherton Gag", which stifled any petitions relating to bringing an end to slavery, at the behest of slave barons. A curious position for the grandson of Joshua Atherton who, so many years earlier had been ready to oppose the Ratification of the Federal Constitution because of its acknowledgment of slavery. From that moment he became known as Gag Law Atherton.

During his first term in Congress in 1838 he presented five resolutions which were adopted, and which created a new resolution that barred Congress from discussing petitions which mentioned bringing slavery to an end. He presented his five resolutions on December 11, 1838. Congress approved them on December 12, 1838.

Several similar resolutions and eventually a standing House rule were approved by Congress from 1835 to 1840, but the "Atherton Gag" was the only one of them to be named after its creator.

Of the five resolutions, the last one is most indicative of his desires since it contains the vital stipulations. Atherton wrote:

5. Resolved, therefore, That all attempts, on the part of Congress, to abolish slavery in the District of Columbia or the Territories, or to prohibit the removal of slaves from State to State, or to discriminate between the institutions of one portion of the country and another, with the views aforesaid, are in violation of the constitution, destructive of the fundamental principles on which the Union of these States rests, and beyond the jurisdiction of Congress; and that every petition, memorial, resolution, proposition, or paper, touching or relating in any way or to any extent whatever to slavery, as aforesaid, or the abolition thereof, shall, on the presentation thereof, without any further action thereon, be laid on the table without being debated, printed, or referred.

Atherton was responsible for composing the gag rule of December 1838, which stifled any petitions relating to slavery. The previous year abolitionists mainly from northern states sent thousands of petitions to Congress for the abolition of slavery.

John Greenleaf Whittier, poet and advocate of the abolition of slavery in the United States referred to him as vile and shifty and wrote poems making reference to both Atherton and the gag, which frustrated Whittier and all the other abolitionists, as it curtailed any open debate in Congress on the subject.

Atherton delivered a speech on the twelve million loan bill in the House of Representatives, on Monday, July 12, 1841.

During the third session of the twenty-fifth United States Congress, Atherton lodged with a Mrs S.A. Hill in Alexandria, Virginia which was almost opposite to the Gadsby's Tavern, which housed ten representatives, all from pro-slavery states, who would have looked for any opportunity to lobby their cause. The gag rule was deeply controversial as it curtailed progressive debate and was extremely unpopular in northern states and frustrated the abolitionists cause; however it still won enough votes in Congress; and this rule remained in place for over 8 years, due to heavy pressure and lobbying from Southern pro-slavery states. It was not until 1844 the House rescinded this gag rule on a motion made by John Quincy Adams. A brave act rescind and recommence debate, however this polarisation proved to be one of the building blocks taking the country towards breaking point and civil war.

In 1844, the House rescinded this gag rule on a motion made by John Quincy Adams. Whatever Atherton's reasons, his late grandfather, Joshua Atherton, as an early ardent anti-slavery campaigner, would have vehemently objected to the creation of a gag rule.

=== United States Senate ===
After winning his election bid, Atherton was elected to the United States Senate as a Democrat in 1843, replacing Leonard Wilcox, and served from March 4, 1843, to March 3, 1849.

While in the Senate, Atherton served as chairman of the Committee on Printing (Twenty-ninth Congress), the Committee on Roads and Canals (Twenty-ninth United States Congress), and the Committee on Finance (Thirtieth United States Congress).

Atherton and Samuel S. Phelps were the only New England Democratic and Whig Senators, respectively, to vote in favor of the Clayton Compromise bill.

Atherton remained active politically for the Democratic Party, even when not serving in office. As an example of his political influence, a regional newspaper, The Boston Pilot of August 28, 1852 reported: "At the Democratic Barbecue in Hillsborough, the Hon. Charles G Atherton presided. Spirited speeches were made by Colonel John Houston Savage of Tennessee, John Van Buren of New York, John B. Weller of California, Maj. Stevens of the U.S Army, Jeremiah Clemens of Alabama, General Dix of New York, Willis A. Gorman of Indiana, Capt. Rynders, and others. The same gentlemen addressed the Democratic Meeting in Faneuil Hall on Friday night, which was kept up until after midnight. It was a spirited affair; and the speakers were all in good tune."

After serving out his term Atherton was not then re-elected, resuming the practice of law in Nashua. However, in November 1852, he was chosen to take the seat left vacant by John P. Hale and returned to the Senate after he took the oath of office for the term beginning March 4, 1853.

Atherton was in the inner circle of Franklin Pierce, at the time he was elected as the 14th president in 1853. Pierce had anticipated making Atherton his spokesman in the Senate at the start of his presidency, however Atherton had died unexpectedly.

Atherton was known to be a heavy whiskey drinker, and he did not attend the Presidential Inauguration of Franklin Pierce, most likely for health reasons, since he had traveled nationwide, campaigning heavily for Franklin Pierce to report first hand on his virtues, his sobriety, his affinity for immigrants, and his valor on the field of battle.

== Personal life ==
He married Ann (Nancy) Barnard Clark, a granddaughter of the Reverend Jeremiah Barnard, Minister for Amherst in 1828. They had no children. Atherton was a close friend to the novelist, Nathaniel Hawthorne.

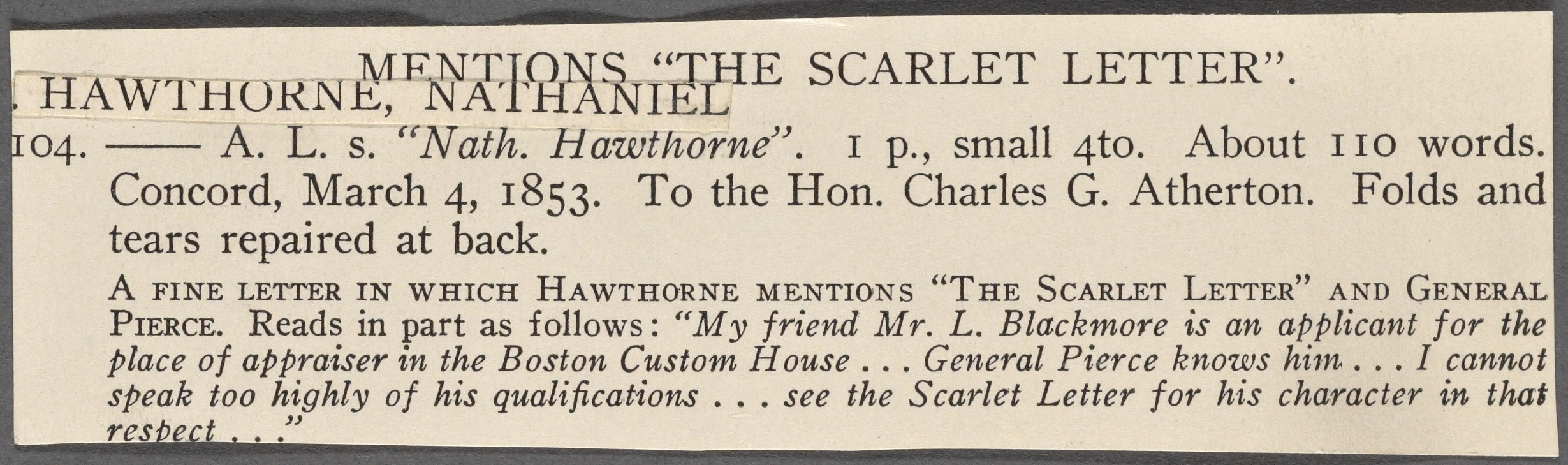

Atherton died suddenly from pulmonary tuberculosis in Manchester, New Hampshire, on November 15, 1853. His unexpected death left a serious vacuum in the Senate.

He was buried in Nashua Cemetery, New Hampshire on November 20, 1853. To mark the occasion of his death, as a senator from the State of New Hampshire, an obituary was delivered in the United States Senate and in the House of Representatives, December 19, 1853.

== Ancestry ==
He is a direct descendant of James Atherton, one of the First Settlers of New England; who arrived in Dorchester, Massachusetts in the 1630s. His great-grandfather was Colonel Peter Atherton, who served in the French and Indian War of the 18th century.

His maternal first cousin was Nathaniel Thayer Jr.

== See also ==
- List of members of the United States Congress who died in office (1790–1899)

U.S. House of Representatives
Preceded by Benning M. Bean; Robert Burns; Samuel Cushman; Franklin Pierce; Joseph Weeks	Member of the U.S. House of Representatives from New Hampshire's at-large congressional district March 4, 1837 – March 3, 1843; Served alongside: Samuel Cushman, James Farrington, Joseph Weeks, Jared W. Williams, Edmund Burke, Ira A. Eastman, Tristram Shaw and John R. Reding	Succeeded by Edmund Burke; John P. Hale; Moses Norris Jr. John R. Reding
U.S. Senate
Preceded by Leonard Wilcox	U.S. senator (Class 3) from New Hampshire; March 4, 1843 – March 3, 1849; Served alongside: Levi Woodbury, Benning W. Jenness, Joseph Cilley and John P. Hale	Succeeded by Moses Norris Jr.
Preceded by John P. Hale	U.S. senator (Class 2) from New Hampshire; March 4, 1853 – November 15, 1853; Served alongside: Moses Norris Jr.	Succeeded by Jared W. Williams
Political offices
Preceded by Dixon Lewis; Alabama	Chairman of the U.S. Senate Committee on Finance; 1847–1849	Succeeded by Daniel Dickinson; New York
