= Henry B. Atherton =

US civil war veteran and lawyer

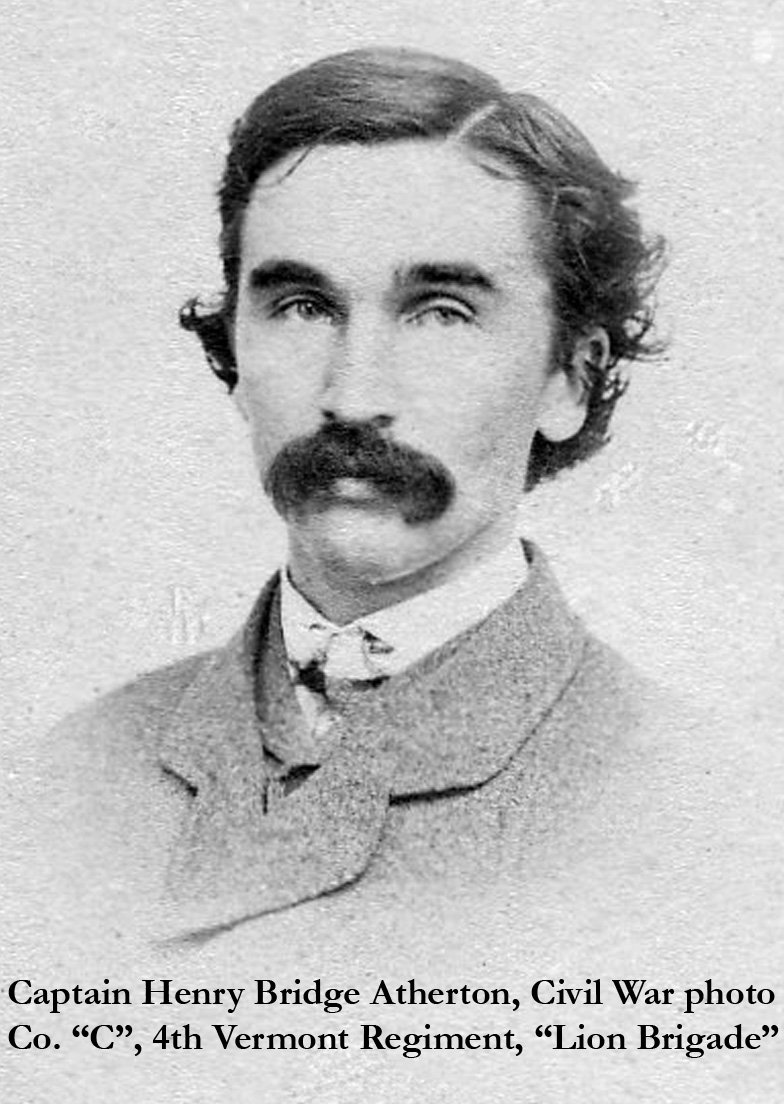
- Henry B. Atherton
- Born: Henry Bridge Atherton; September 21, 1835; Cavendish, Vermont, U.S.
- Died: February 6, 1906 (aged 70); Nashua, New Hampshire, U.S.
- Education: Dartmouth College; Albany Law School
- Occupations: Attorney, State legislator, Newspaper editor and writer
- Spouse: Ella Blaylock Atherton (m. 1898) Abbie Louise Armington (m. 1861)
- Children: 6

Henry Bridge Atherton (21 September 1835 – 6 February 1906) was a soldier in the American Civil War from Vermont, a lawyer and state legislator for New Hampshire during the late 19th century.

== Early life and education ==
Atherton was born in Cavendish, Vermont, on September 21, 1835. The youngest son of a successful farmer and lawyer, Jonathan Atherton (1787–1875) and Roxanna Ives (1797–1891). His ancestors had settled in the area as part of the New Hampshire Grants.

He was educated at Duttonsville School and then at Black River Academy from 1851 to 1855, Leland Seminary in Townsend, Massachusetts, where he excelled. Poetry, rather than farming was his passion, however he went on to pursue a career in law.

Atherton was a staunch abolitionist, and was likely to have been influenced by his teacher, John Leland. Nevertheless, support for abolition was strong amongst the citizens of Vermont; to the extent that the leading abolitionist of the day, John Brown was invited in 1856 to address the community of Proctorsville, Vermont during his travels across the Northern United States. Brown was seeking monetary donations, as well as armaments for the Free-Staters. Atherton, who had yet to graduate, advocated his support by inviting Brown to use his office, whilst he was Secretary to the Vermont Senate. Atherton studied the legal position of the supply of guns to the recent arrivals in Kansas Territory, settled by the New England Emigrant Aid Company. The confrontation had commenced in 1854 and had become known as Bleeding Kansas, a prelude to the civil war. On March 9, 1882, Atherton wrote to Brown's biographer, John Redparth of his personal involvement, and that of the former Governor, Ryland Fletcher. Atherton's letter, described not only his role in aiding Brown (who was later tried and executed in West Virginia), but the endorsement of Brown by the town elders, who were willing to provide old guns. Atherton also described Vermont's direct aid of $20,000, which assisted in creating a shift in the balance of political power in Kansas Territory.

Atherton graduated from Dartmouth College in 1858. Prior to joining the law offices of John F Dean, he served under Joseph Sawyer of Alton, New Hampshire. He was admitted to the bar, and entered into partnership with Deane. In 1860 he received a law degree from Albany Law School. He was admitted and sworn as an attorney of the court in Montpelier, Vermont.

== American Civil War ==
During August 1861, Atherton entered the service of the Union Army and was commissioned to serve under Colonel Edwin H. Stoughton, as Captain of Company C, 4th Vermont Infantry Regiment in Brattleboro, Vermont, having first offered his services to Governor Erastus Fairbanks to raise at least thirty recruits. His list of recruits has been preserved by historians.

His contribution to the war effort was curtailed in Virginia after being severely wounded in battle on April 16, 1862, during the Peninsula campaign, in the Battle of Lee's Mill, by a bullet in the groin, and a shrapnel wound to the head. His injuries were so severe that he was considered disabled and discharged from active duty.

== Career ==
Atherton did not allow his disability to impede. He had married immediately prior to going to war. In October 1862 he went into journalism, by accepting the editorial management of The Telegraph of Nashua. He remained as editor until 1864, returning to practice law. He entered into politics and was an elected member of the New Hampshire General Court and first served in the state legislature from 1867 to 1868.

Among the many positions of trust and honor that he held were those of treasurer of Hillsborough County; and the postmaster of Nashua (1872 to 1876).

He was a delegate to the Republican National Convention in 1884 which took place in Chicago. He returned to the state legislature, serving from 1885 to 1887. The General Railroad Legislation of New Hampshire (1883) was known as the "Atherton Bill".

In 1890, he was elected member of the New Hampshire Board of Education, becoming its president in 1893.

Atherton was also offered, a high-profile role of governorship of Alaska, but politely declined. He had been nominated to fill the position of land commissioner for American Samoa by President Benjamin Harrison, under the Treaty of Berlin (1889) where Germany ceded this territory to the United States of America.

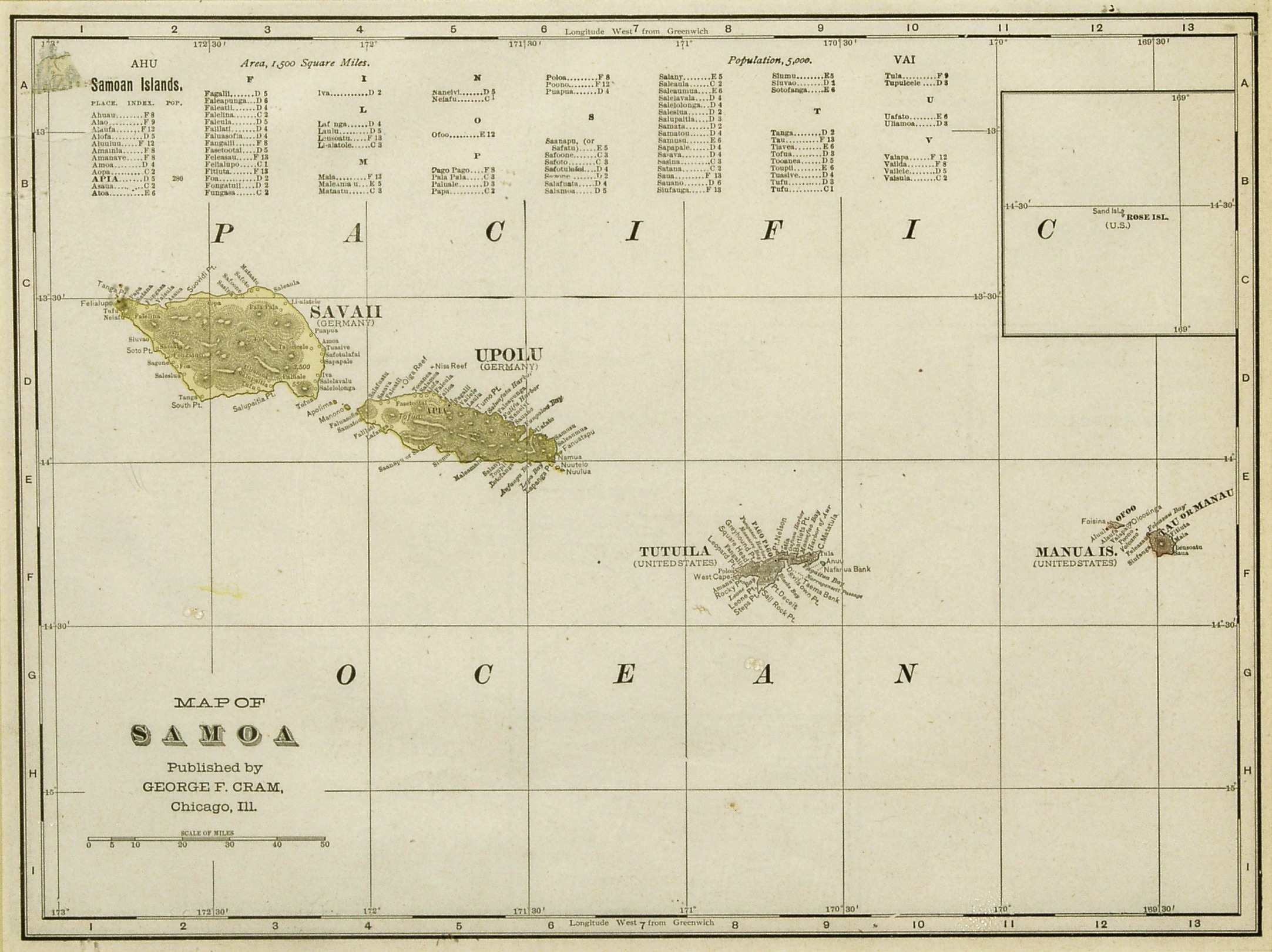
The Samoan Archipelago (1900–1914)

He returned to practice law when not in public office. Records of pension claims prepared by Atherton and received by the Adjutant General for Civil War veterans and their heirs have survived.

Atherton served as a director of the Provident Mutual Relief Association of Concord, New Hampshire.

== Literary works and arts ==
Atherton enjoyed poetry and the arts. In 1851, the age of 16, he wrote "Beware of the Widow," which would take on a tragic meaning just ten years later, with the advent of war:

Beware of The Widow

The widow is a dangerous thing. With soft, black shinning curls, And looketh more bewitching Than an host of romping girls;

Her laugh is so delicious- So, knowing, clear, beside. You’d never dream she’s thinking Soon to become a bride.

Her dress, though made of sables, Gives roundness to her form- A touch of something thoughtful, A witching, winning charm.

And when she sits down by you, With quiet, easy grace- A tear may fall unbidden, Or a smile light up her face.

Her voice is soft melodious- And lute-like in its tone.

She sometimes sighs: “it’s dreadful To pass through life alone.” And she’d tell you, you remind her Of the loved one dead and gone.

Your step, your form, your features; Thus the widow will run on.

Oh! Listen, yet be careful, For well she plays her part-

Her lips distill the nectar That doth enslave the heart.

Be barded or she’ll win you, With smiles, and sighs, and tears;

I’l saith she’ll wear the breeches, too,

And box your silly ears!

His poem appears unsigned in various sources; however, they form part of his collection of poems identified by the Cavendish Historical Society.

As well as poetry, Atherton enjoyed making sketches, both scenic as well as of people. A notable sketch is of Henry Turner, an African-American, whom he described in a letter to his wife dated March 13, 1862, as "a contraband 16 years old, bright and active". He went on to describe him as "an acquisition". Union Officers were permitted to have servants and Atherton hired Henry, whom he referred to as "Vort". By the time of Atherton's discharge from the Union Army, Vort was fully literate and went on to reside with Atherton in Nashua. Letters of Vort's request for pay increases survive. A sketch of Vort by Atherton forms part of the Rauner Special Collections Library, of Dartmouth College. "The papers of Henry B. Atherton", contain a range of personal and business documents, as well as other memorabilia, such as sketches from the civil war.

Atherton was the author of many articles, both political or historical. Of particular note from a foreign policy perspective was "Which : American unity, or British domination?". His historical articles included "The Old Indian Road", covering the history of Vermont, and the Crown Point Military Road and the captivity of Mrs. Johns, mother of the first European child born in Vermont.

In 1895 he wrote "Topography and Surface Geology, from the History of Nashua".

== Personal life ==
Atherton married Abbie Louise Armington (1840–1896) of Ludlow on January 7, 1861. They had four children.

He was a Mason and a past commander of the Grand Army of the Republic, a fraternity organization for veteran union soldiers.

Following the death of his first wife, he married Ella Blaylock Atherton M. D. (1860–1933), a physician in Nashua. an American physician who was the first woman to perform abdominal surgery in New Hampshire. They married in 1898 and had two children. Atherton resided in Nashua the remainder of his life.

Atherton took an avid interest in his own genealogy, particularly during they time he held the position of postmaster of Nashua. He corresponded with Thomas H. Atherton and other Atherton’s who were postmasters within the United States. His personal papers relating to the origins of various branches of his family tree have been preserved by local historical societies, in both Vermont (his place of birth) and New Hampshire (his adoptive state).

Atherton died at his home in Fairmount Heights, Nashua, of pneumonia, on February 6, 1906, aged 71. He is buried at Edgewood Cemetery in Nashua, New Hampshire.

== Ancestry ==
His mother was a cousin of Bishop Levi Silliman Ives and U.S. District Judge Nathan K. Hall. He was also a distant relative, through his mother, of Samuel Morse, inventor of the Morse code, and Chancellor James Kent. His Atherton lineage descends from James Atherton, an early settler to New England; who arrived in Dorchester, Massachusetts in the 1630s. His grandfather was Jonathan Atherton, who was one of the first families to settle on Cavendish in the 1780s; and by 1785 was the first elected representative for the town of Cavendish, and prior to that, a veteran of the Revolutionary War and the Battles of Lexington and Concord.

== Notable descendants ==
- Henry Francis Atherton (1883–1949) of Long Island. Lawyer and Harvard Alumni. Chairman of the board of Allied Chemical and Dye and Secretary of the National Aniline and Chemical Company.
- Blaylock Atherton (1900–1963) of Nashua, New Hampshire. Republican member of New Hampshire State House of Representatives: Nashua 1st Ward (1937–43) and (1945–1948); member of New Hampshire State Senate (1943–1945). Married on September 6, 1924, to Katherine E. Bremner.
