= Charles Humphrey Atherton =

American politician

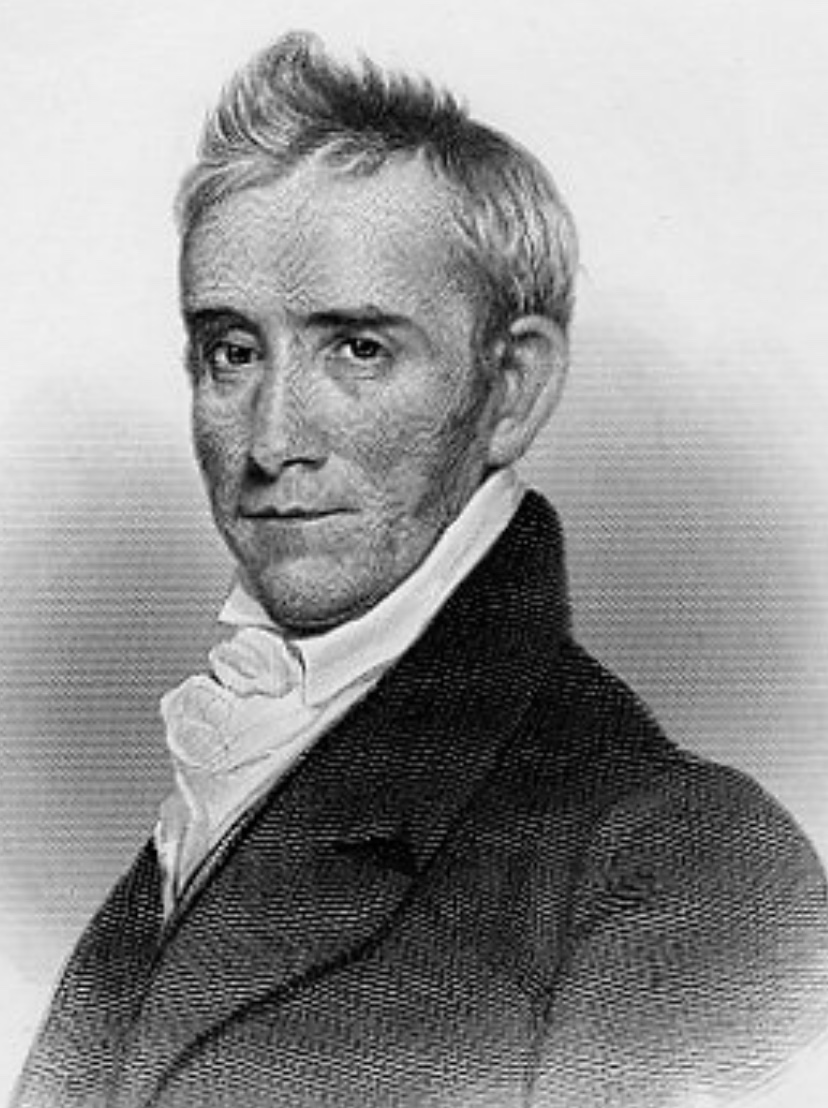

Member of the U.S. House of Representatives from New Hampshire's at-large Congressional district
- In office March 4, 1815 – March 3, 1817
- Preceded by: Samuel Smith
- Succeeded by: Nathaniel Upham

Member of the New Hampshire House of Representatives
- In office 1823–1839

Personal details
- Born: August 14, 1773 Amherst, Province of New Hampshire, British America
- Died: January 8, 1853 (aged 79) Amherst, New Hampshire
- Resting place: Old Cemetery; Amherst, New Hampshire
- Citizenship: U.S.
- Party: Federalist
- Spouse: Mary Ann Toppan Atherton
- Relations: William Gordon
- Children: Charles G. Atherton
- Education: Harvard University
- Profession: Lawyer; Politician; Farmer; Banker; Historian

Charles Humphrey Atherton (August 14, 1773 – January 8, 1853), an American Federalist politician, banker and a distinguished attorney from New Hampshire.

Atherton served once as a United States representative from New Hampshire from 1815 to 1817, but did not seek re-election. He was thrice elected to the state legislature and was a member of the New Hampshire House of Representatives in 1823, 1838 and 1839.

== Early life ==
He was the son of Joshua Atherton and Abigail (Goss) Atherton. His grandfather was Colonel Peter Atherton, and a direct descendant of James Atherton, one of the First Settlers of New England; who arrived in Dorchester, Massachusetts in 1630s. He studied alongside Elijah Dunbar, the son of Revered Samuel Dunbar at Harvard University. He graduated from Harvard in 1794, and was a member of Phi Beta Kappa.

== Career ==
Atherton had a law practice in Amherst, New Hampshire, having been admitted to the bar in 1797.

He served as register of probate for Hillsborough County from 1798 to 1807. During this period he delivered a eulogy on George Washington, who died on December 14, 1799; at Amherst. He sent a copy to Martha Washington on Mar 23, 1800.

Atherton was elected as a Federalist candidate to the United States House of Representatives in the Fourteenth United States Congress, he served in Congress from March 4, 1815, to March 3, 1817. He declined to run for reelection in 1816 and instead served as a member of the New Hampshire House of Representatives from 1823 to 1839.

After leaving the State House, he resumed the practice of law and was one of the founders of the Hillsborough County Agricultural Society in 1819.

He was president of the board of directors of the Farmers' Bank when it was formed in 1825 and served during the existence of the corporation.

== Other interests ==
Atherton was a prominent figure in the local Unitarian movement, he later helped establish The Christian Society in Amherst.

He gave an oration on the anniversary of American independence in 1798 at his local church in Amherst.

He was a member of the New Hampshire Historical Society, and was elected a member of the American Antiquarian Society in 1815. He prepared various papers for the New Hampshire Historical Society. He delivered an address in Concord at their annual meeting on June 8, 1831.

Atherton also wrote about Wyseman Clagett, the father of Clifton Clagett, who had moved to his substantial estates to Litchfield, New Hampshire shortly before the Revolution, and was involved in the temporary government serving as the only Solicitor General, the post being abolished shortly before Clagett's death in 1784.

In his final years, Atherton published his father's memoirs titled "Memoir of the Hon Joshua Atherton", published in 1852, by Crosby, Nichol and Company of Boston.

Memoir of the Hon. Joshua Atherton

== Personal life ==
On October 30, 1803, Atherton married Mary Ann Toppan. They had seven children, and their son Charles G. Atherton was a United States Senator. Atherton's brother-in-law William Gordon was also a U.S. Representative from New Hampshire.

He became a widower after the passing of his wife Mary, who died on October 15, 1817, just five months after childbirth and left four surviving children: James (aged 4), Mary (aged 7), George (aged 9) and Charles (aged 13).

Atherton who had not sought re-election in 1816, is likely to have focused on his family's needs. He was painted by Raphaelle Peale in 1819. He returned to politics, albeit at State level in 1823. That same year he was painted by another renowned artist; Gilbert Stuart in Boston.

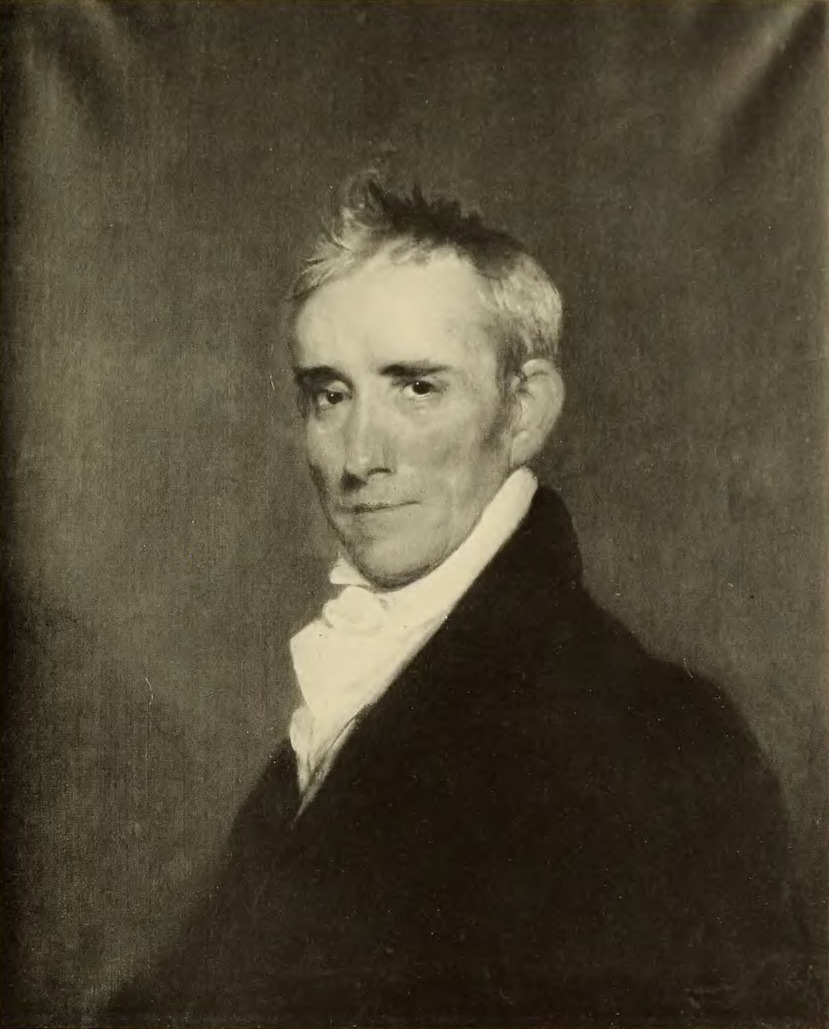
Charles H. Atherton by Gilbert Stuart

In 1837, his recently deceased son, James was painted from memory by the acclaimed artist and historian, John Trumbull who had up until the year prior had served as president of the American Academy of the Fine Arts. The artists painting skills in his senior ages had declined, and the perceived likeness of his son was not appreciated by his eldest daughter Mary.

== Death ==
Atherton died in Amherst, Hillsborough County, New Hampshire, on January 8, 1853 (age 79 years, 147 days). He is interred at the Old Cemetery in Amherst, New Hampshire, along with his wife Mary (died on October 15, 1817) and five of their children. He had accumulated one of the largest estates ever left in Amherst.

== Descendants ==
The following five children died young:

- Mary Anne Atherton (July 11, 1806 - September 24, 1807, aged 14 months).
- Christopher Atherton (Aug 6, 1815 - May 3, 1816, aged nine months).
- Henry Atherton (May 19, 1817 - May 19, 1817, aged 1 day).
- George Atherton (September 25, 1808 - April 10, 1825, aged 16). He was a member of the Junior Class of Harvard College.

All 4 were laid to rest in the family grave at Old Cemetery, Amherst, NH.

- James Humphrey Atherton (1813–1837, a broker, died in New York, aged 24) He was painted by memory by John Trumbull.

The following children died after the death of Charles Humphrey Atherton:

- Mary Ann Toppan Atherton (December 18, 1810 - January 26, 1853, aged 42). She survived her father by just 18 days.
- Charles Gordon Atherton (July 4, 1804 – November 15, 1853, aged 49)

U.S. House of Representatives
Preceded by Samuel Smith	United States House of Representatives Seat 2 Of New Hampshire's at-large congressional district 1815—1817	Succeeded by Nathaniel Upham
