= Jared W. Williams =

American politician (1796–1864)

Jared Warner Williams
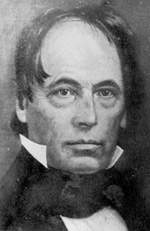

United States Senator from New Hampshire
- In office November 29, 1853 – August 4, 1854
- Appointed by: Noah Martin
- Preceded by: Charles G. Atherton
- Succeeded by: John P. Hale

21st Governor of New Hampshire
- In office June 3, 1847 – June 7, 1849
- Preceded by: Anthony Colby
- Succeeded by: Samuel Dinsmoor, Jr.

Member of the U.S. House of Representatives from New Hampshire's at-large district (Seat 3)
- In office March 4, 1837 – March 3, 1841
- Preceded by: Franklin Pierce
- Succeeded by: John Randall Reding

Member of the New Hampshire Senate
- In office 1832–1834

Member of the New Hampshire House of Representatives
- In office 1830–1831; 1835–1836

Personal details
- Born: December 22, 1796 West Woodstock, Connecticut, U.S.
- Died: September 29, 1864 (aged 67) Lancaster, New Hampshire, U.S.
- Party: Democratic
- Profession: Politician, Lawyer

Jared Warner Williams (December 22, 1796 – September 29, 1864) was an American lawyer and politician from Lancaster, New Hampshire, who was a U.S. representative, the 21st governor of New Hampshire 1847 to 1849 and a United States senator.

== Biography ==
Williams was born in West Woodstock, Connecticut, on December 22, 1796. He graduated from Brown University in 1818, studied at the Litchfield Law School, and became an attorney in Lancaster, New Hampshire.

A Democrat, he sat in the New Hampshire House of Representatives from 1830 to 1831, the New Hampshire State Senate from 1832 to 1834 and the New Hampshire House again from 1835 to 1836.

In 1836, he won election to the U.S. House of Representatives and he sat two terms, March 4, 1837, to March 3, 1841. In 1847, he was elected governor and served two one-year terms, June 3, 1847, to June 7, 1849.

After leaving the governorship, Williams was appointed Coos County Judge of Probate, a position he held until 1852. In 1853, he was appointed to the U.S. Senate, temporarily filling the vacancy caused by Charles G. Atherton's death, and he served from November 29, 1853, to August 4, 1854.

Williams died in Lancaster on September 29, 1864, and is buried in the Summer Street Cemetery there.

Party political offices
Preceded by John Hardy Steele	Democratic nominee for Governor of New Hampshire; 1846, 1847, 1848	Succeeded by Samuel Dinsmoor Jr.
U.S. House of Representatives
Preceded by Benning M. Bean; Robert Burns; Samuel Cushman; Franklin Pierce; Joseph Weeks	Member of the U.S. House of Representatives from New Hampshire's at-large congressional district March 4, 1837 – March 4, 1841; Served alongside: Charles G. Atherton, Samuel Cushman, James Farrington, Joseph Weeks, Edmund Burke, Ira A. Eastman and Tristram Shaw	Succeeded by Charles G. Atherton; Edmund Burke; Ira A. Eastman; John R. Reding; Tristram Shaw
Political offices
Preceded by Anthony Colby	Governor of New Hampshire; 1847 – 1849	Succeeded by Samuel Dinsmoor, Jr.
U.S. Senate
Preceded by Charles G. Atherton	U.S. senator (Class 2) from New Hampshire; November 29, 1853 – August 4, 1854; Served alongside: Moses Norris, Jr.	Succeeded by John P. Hale
