= Governor Dinsmoor =

Governor Dinsmoor may refer to:

- Samuel Dinsmoor (1766–1835), 14th Governor of New Hampshire
- Samuel Dinsmoor Jr. (1799–1869), 22nd Governor of New Hampshire
