= 1852 New Hampshire gubernatorial election =

- March 9, 1852
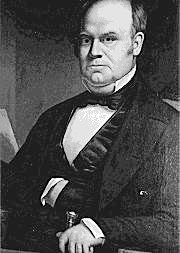

| Nominee | Noah Martin | Thomas E. Sawyer | John Atwood |
| Party | Democratic | Whig | Free Soil |
| Popular vote | 31,177 | 20,252 | 9,683 |
| Percentage | 50.79% | 32.99% | 15.78% |
- County results Martin: 40–50% 50–60% 60–70% Sawyer: 40–50%
Governor before election
Samuel Dinsmoor Jr.
Democratic
Elected Governor
Noah Martin
Democratic

The 1852 New Hampshire gubernatorial election was held on March 9, 1852, in order to elect the Governor of New Hampshire. Democratic nominee and former member of the New Hampshire House of Representatives Noah Martin defeated Whig nominee Thomas E. Sawyer and Free Soil Party nominee John Atwood.

== General election ==
On election day, March 9, 1852, Democratic nominee Noah Martin won the election by a margin of 10,925 votes against his foremost opponent Whig nominee Thomas E. Sawyer, thereby retaining Democratic control over the office of Governor. Martin was sworn in as the 23rd Governor of New Hampshire on June 3, 1852.

=== Results ===
New Hampshire gubernatorial election, 1852
| Party | Candidate | Votes | % |
|---|---|---|---|
| Democratic | Noah Martin | 31,177 | 50.79 |
| Whig | Thomas E. Sawyer | 20,252 | 32.99 |
| Free Soil | John Atwood | 9,683 | 15.78 |
| | Scattering | 269 | 0.44 |
| Total votes | | 61,381 | 100.00 |
| Democratic hold | | | |
