= David Barker Jr. =

American politician

Member of the U.S. House of Representatives from New Hampshire's New Hampshire district
- In office March 4, 1827 – March 3, 1829
- Preceded by: Nehemiah Eastman
- Succeeded by: Joseph Hammons

Member of the New Hampshire House of Representatives
- In office 1823; 1825-1826

Personal details
- Born: January 8, 1797 Stratham, New Hampshire
- Died: April 1, 1834 (aged 37) Rochester, New Hampshire
- Citizenship: United States
- Party: Adams Party
- Spouse: Mary Upham Barker
- Children: David Barker; Mary Barker
- Parent: Col. David Barker
- Education: Harvard University
- Profession: Attorney; politician

David Barker Jr. (January 8, 1797 – April 1, 1834) was an American politician and a U.S. representative from New Hampshire.

== Early life ==
Born in Stratham, New Hampshire, Barker was the eldest son of Col. David Barker and at age eleven attended Phillips Exeter Academy, Exeter. He began attending Harvard University at the age of fourteen and earned a degree in 1815. He began the study of law with John P. Hale, Esq.; earned a second degree and was admitted to the bar in 1819.

== Career ==
Upon his admission to the bar, Barker began his law practice in Rochester, New Hampshire. He served as member of the New Hampshire House of Representatives in 1823, 1825, and 1826.

Elected as an Adams candidate to the Twentieth Congress, Barker served as a United States representative for New Hampshire from March 4, 1827, to March 3, 1829. He resumed the practice of law after his term in Congress and was an original member of the New Hampshire Historical Society.

== Death ==
Barker died in Rochester, Strafford County, New Hampshire, on April 1, 1834 (age 37 years, 83 days). He is interred at Old Rochester Cemetery, Rochester, New Hampshire.

== Family life ==
Barker married Mary Upham on October 2, 1823, and they had two children, David and Mary.

U.S. House of Representatives
Preceded by Henry Moore Baker	U.S. Representative from New Hampshire; 1827—1829	Succeeded by Ichabod Bartlett
