= Nehemiah Eastman =

American politician

Member of the U.S. House of Representatives from New Hampshire's At-Large district
- In office March 4, 1825 – March 3, 1827
- Preceded by: Matthew Harvey
- Succeeded by: David Barker Jr.

Member of the New Hampshire Senate
- In office 1820–1825

Member of the New Hampshire House of Representatives
- In office 1813–1814

Personal details
- Born: June 16, 1782 Gilmanton, New Hampshire, U.S.
- Died: January 11, 1856 (aged 73) Farmington, New Hampshire, U.S.
- Resting place: Farmington Cemetery; Farmington, New Hampshire
- Party: Adams Party
- Spouse: Anstriss Barker Woodbury Eastman
- Relations: Ira Allen Eastman; Levi Woodbury
- Children: Charles Eastman; Martha Ann Eastman; George Nehemiah Eastman; Henry Patrick Eastman
- Profession: Lawyer; Banker; Politician

Nehemiah Eastman (June 16, 1782 – January 11, 1856) was an American lawyer, banker and politician from New Hampshire. He served as a member of the United States House of Representatives, the New Hampshire Senate and the New Hampshire House of Representatives in the early 1800s.

== Early life ==
Born in Gilmanton, New Hampshire, Eastman was the son of Ebenezer and Mary (Butler) Eastman. He attended the local academy in Gilmanton and then read law with John Curtis Chamberlain, future member of the United States House of Representatives. He was admitted to the bar in 1807 and began the practice of law in Farmington, New Hampshire.

== Political career ==
Eastman began his political career as a member of the New Hampshire House of Representatives in 1813. He served in the New Hampshire Senate from 1820 to 1825. Elected as an Adams candidate to the Nineteenth Congress, Eastman served as United States Representative for the state of New Hampshire from March 4, 1825 to March 3, 1827. After leaving Congress, he resumed the practice of law. In 1834, Eastman and James Farrington organized the Rochester Bank in Rochester, New Hampshire.

== Death ==
Eastman died in Farmington, Strafford County, New Hampshire, on January 11, 1856. He is interred at Farmington Cemetery in Farmington, New Hampshire.

== Personal life ==
On October 24, 1813, Eastman married Anstriss Barker Woodbury in Francestown, New Hampshire and they had four children: Charles, Martha Ann, George Nehemiah, and Henry Patrick. His brother-in-law was Levi Woodbury, an Associate Justice of the Supreme Court of the United States and 9th Governor of New Hampshire.

Eastman was the uncle of Ira Allen Eastman, a United States Representative from New Hampshire.

U.S. House of Representatives
Preceded by Matthew Harvey	Member of the U.S. House of Representatives from New Hampshire's at-large congressional district March 4, 1825 – March 3, 1827	Succeeded by David Barker Jr.
