= Joseph Hammons =

American politician

Member of the U.S. House of Representatives from New Hampshire's at-large district
- In office March 4, 1829 – March 3, 1833
- Preceded by: Titus Brown
- Succeeded by: Joseph M. Harper

Personal details
- Born: March 3, 1787 Alstead, Cheshire County; New Hampshire, USA
- Died: March 29, 1836 (aged 49) Farmington, Strafford County; New Hampshire, USA
- Resting place: Hammons Family Cemetery; Farmington, Strafford County; New Hampshire, USA
- Party: Jacksonian
- Occupation: Physician; Politician

Joseph Hammons (March 3, 1787 – March 29, 1836) was an American politician and a United States representative from New Hampshire.

== Early life ==
Hammons was born in Cornish, York County, Maine, and educated by private tutors and in the common schools. In addition, he studied medicine in Ossipee, Carroll County, New Hampshire and commenced practice in Farmington, Strafford County, New Hampshire in 1817. He was the only physician in town for many years.

== Career ==
Elected as a Jacksonian to the Twenty-first and Twenty-second Congresses, Hammons served as United States Representative for the state of New Hampshire from (March 4, 1829 – March 3, 1833). After leaving Congress, he continued his practice and was postmaster at Dover, Strafford County, New Hampshire from June 1833 until his death.

== Death ==
Hammons died in Farmington, Strafford County, New Hampshire, on March 29, 1836 (age 49 years, 26 days). He is interred at the Hammons Family Cemetery, Farmington, Strafford County, New Hampshire.

U.S. House of Representatives
Preceded by Titus Brown	Member of the U.S. House of Representatives from New Hampshire; 1829-1833	Succeeded by Joseph M. Harper
