= 1832 New Hampshire gubernatorial election =

- March 13, 1832
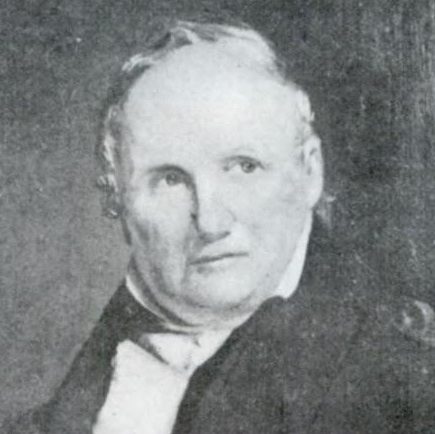

Nominee	Samuel Dinsmoor	Ichabod Bartlett
Party	Democratic	National Republican
Popular vote	24,167	14,920
Percentage	61.60%	38.03%
- County results Dinsmoor: 50–60% 60–70% 80–90% Bartlett: 50–60%
Governor before election
Samuel Dinsmoor
Democratic
Elected Governor
Samuel Dinsmoor
Democratic

The 1832 New Hampshire gubernatorial election was held on March 13, 1832.

Incumbent Democratic Governor Samuel Dinsmoor defeated National Republican nominee Ichabod Bartlett with 61.60% of the vote in a re-match of the previous year's election.

== General election ==
=== Candidates ===
- Ichabod Bartlett, National Republican, former U.S. Representative, unsuccessful candidate for Governor in 1831
- Samuel Dinsmoor, Democratic, incumbent Governor

=== Results ===
1832 New Hampshire gubernatorial election (Note: Some sources give slightly different results. The result given is taken from the New Hampshire Senate Journal.)
Party	Candidate	Votes	%	±%
Democratic	Samuel Dinsmoor (incumbent)	24,167	61.60%	
National Republican	Ichabod Bartlett	14,920	38.03%	
Scattering		146	0.37%	
Majority		9,247	23.57%	
Turnout		39,233		
Democratic hold		Swing		
