= 1831 New Hampshire gubernatorial election =

- March 8, 1831
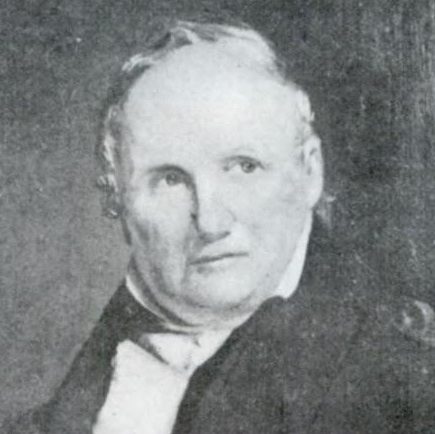

Nominee	Samuel Dinsmoor	Ichabod Bartlett
Party	Democratic	National Republican
Popular vote	23,503	18,681
Percentage	55.57%	44.17%
- County results Dinsmoor: 50–60% 60–70% 70–80% Bartlett: 60–70%
Governor before election
Joseph M. Harper (acting)
Democratic
Elected Governor
Samuel Dinsmoor
Democratic

The 1831 New Hampshire gubernatorial election was held on March 8, 1831.

Incumbent Democratic Governor Matthew Harvey resigned on February 28, 1831, to take up a seat on the United States District Court for the District of New Hampshire. President of the New Hampshire Senate Joseph M. Harper served as acting Governor for the remainder of Harvey's term.

Democratic nominee Samuel Dinsmoor defeated National Republican nominee Ichabod Bartlett with 55.57% of the vote.

== General election ==
=== Candidates ===
- Ichabod Bartlett, National Republican, member of the New Hampshire House of Representatives
- Samuel Dinsmoor, Democratic, judge of probate of Cheshire County, former U.S. Representative, unsuccessful candidate for Governor in 1823

=== Results ===
1831 New Hampshire gubernatorial election (Note: Some sources give slightly different results. The result given is taken from the New Hampshire Senate Journal.)
Party	Candidate	Votes	%	±%
Democratic	Samuel Dinsmoor	23,503	55.57%	
National Republican	Ichabod Bartlett	18,681	44.17%	
Scattering		110	0.26%	
Majority		4,822	11.40%	
Turnout		42,294		
Democratic hold		Swing		
