= Corrina Sephora Mensoff =

Corrina Sephora
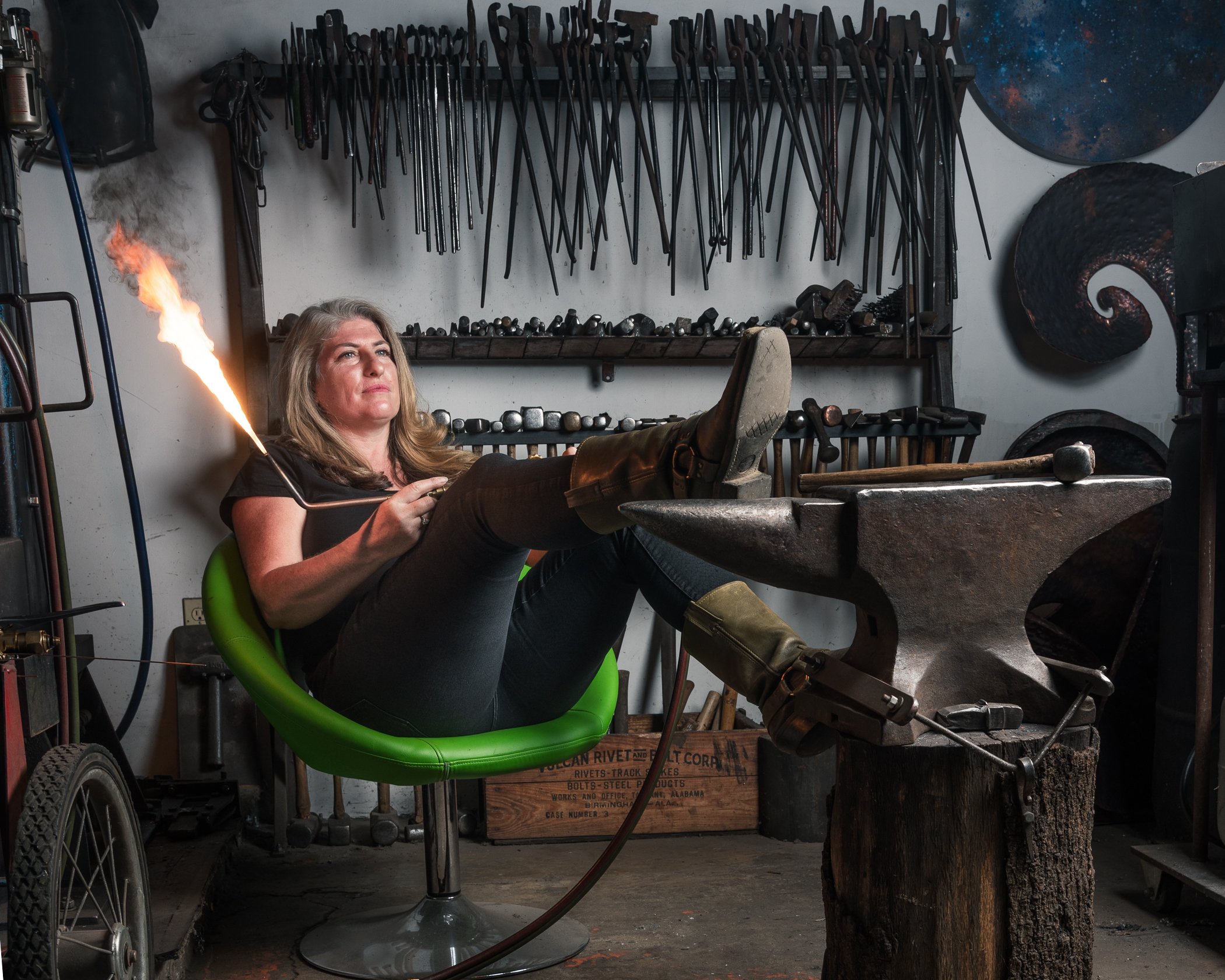
- Corrina Sephora Mensoff

Background information
- Born: Corrina Sephora Mensoff; November 4, 1971 (age 54)
- Occupation: Visual Artist
- Years active: 1996–present
- Website: http://www.corrinasephora.com

Corrina Sephora Mensoff (born November 4, 1971, in Alstead, New Hampshire) is a visual artist who specializes in metal work, sculpture, painting, installation, and mixed media in Atlanta, Georgia, in the United States. Corrina works with universal and personal themes of loss and transformation, within the context of contemporary society. In Corrina’s most recent bodies of work she is exploring lunar images, cells, and the universe as “a meditation in the making.” In a concurrent body of work she has delved into the physical transformation of guns, altering their molecular structure into flowers and garden tools through hot forging the materials. Her work has led her to community involvement with the conversation of guns in our society.

== Education ==
Mensoff received her BFA in Sculpture and Metalsmithing at the Massachusetts College of Art in Boston in 1995. She received her MFA in Sculpture at Georgia State University in 2005.

She created a self-guided journeyman's apprenticeship in Atlanta. She founded Phoenix Metalworks, specializing in sculpture, furniture and architectural works. She taught at the University of Georgia in Athens, the Savannah College of Art and Design (SCAD), and Georgia State University. She has conducted research on architecture and environment in Croatia and Romania. She has won the City of Atlanta Arts for Services Grant three times.

== Awards ==
- 2023 Honorable Mention, City of North Charleston Sculpture Exhibition / Competition, Charleston, SC
- 2021 Awarded the National Competition to create a public piece at the Freeport Art Museum
- 2020 Fulton County Council for the Arts, Creative Arts and Culture Grant
- 2020 Judith Alexander Award
- 2019 Small Arts Project Grant, Fulton County Arts & Culture, Fulton County, Georgia
- 2018 - 2019 Contracts for Arts Services Grant, Mayor’s Office of Cultural Affairs, Atlanta, Georgia
- 2018 Hambidge Creative Residency Program, The Hambidge Center, Rabun Gap, Georgia
- 2016 Artists in Residence Program, Mendocino Art Center, Mendocino, California
- 2015 First Place Award, City of North Charleston Outdoor Sculpture Exhibition & Competition, North Charleston, South Carolina
- 2014 Contracts for Arts Services Grant, Mayor’s Office of Cultural Affairs, Atlanta, Georgia
- 2012 Hambidge Creative Residency Program, The Hambidge Center, Rabun Gap, Georgia
- 2012 Second Place Award, City of North Charleston Outdoor Sculpture Exhibition & Competition,
- 2009 Honorable Mention Award, City of North Charleston Outdoor Sculpture Exhibition Competition, North Charleston, South Carolina
- 2008 Sculptural Architectural Installation at the Martin Luther King Natatorium
- 2007 Artist In Residence in Vermont Studio Center
- 2006 Artist In Residence in Hungarian Multicultural Center
- 2005 Sculptural Architectural Installation at Temple Sinai, Atlanta
- 2004 Scottish Sculpture Workshop
- 2003 Sculptural Architectural Installation at the Atlanta Botanical Gardens
- 2003 "Best in Show" from Annette Cone Skeleton at Museum of Contemporary Art Georgia
- 2003 "Silver Award" from Icarus International
- 2002 "Silver Sculpture Award" from National Ornamental Miscellaneous Metals Associations
- 2002 Artist In Residence in Hambidge, Georgia
- 2001 Artist Blacksmith Association of North America Grant to France & Germany
- 1996 Artist In Residence in Penland School of Craft, North Carolina

== Solo/ duo exhibitions ==
- 2024 Dwelling in the Sea of Time and Space, Palazzo Bembo, Venice, Italy (Forthcoming)
- 2023 Uncharted Waters, Spalding Nix Fine Art, Atlanta GA (Forthcoming)
- 2023 On the Waters of Time, 30 Year Retrospective, Aviation Contemporary Art Gallery, Atlanta, GA
- 2023 Echos of Ecology, Prayers & Rituals, Reeves House Gallery, Woodstock, GA
- 2021 Out of the Ordinary Flotilla, Spalding Nix Fine Art, Atlanta, GA
- 2020 Blood of the Earth II, Sewell Mill Library & Cultural Center, Marietta, GA
- 2019 Alchemical Divide, Madison-Morgan Cultural Center, Madison, Georgia
- 2019 Blood of the Earth, Sinclair Gallery, ArtsXChange, East Point, Georgia
- 2019 Between the Deep Blue Sea and the Universe, Mason Fine Arts, Atlanta, Georgia
- 2017 On Waters of Time, Callanwolde Fine Arts Gallery, Atlanta, Georgia
- 2017 Voyages Unforeseen, Kibbee Gallery, Atlanta, Georgia (Duo)
- 2015 Emergence from the Waters, Gallery 72, Mayor’s Office of Cultural Affairs, Atlanta, Georgia
- 2014 Nautical Observations, Art Partners, High Museum of Art, Atlanta, Georgia
- 2013 Soaring on the Surface of the Waters, Norcross Cultural Arts Center, Norcross, Georgia
- 2012 Flowing as Water, Rodriguez Room, Goat Farm Arts Center, Atlanta, Georgia
- 2008 Rescue Vehicles and Souls of the South, House of Colors, Atlanta, Georgia

== Group exhibitions ==
- The 8th International Tour Show, Espacio Gallery, London, England
- 2023 Journeys, P. Fine Art, Suwanee, GA
- 2022 Coterie, Gallery 378, Atlanta, GA
- 2021 Elemental, Select Group Show, Marietta Cobb Museum, Marietta, GA
- 2020 Voices and Visions, The Highland Art Center, Chicago, IL
- Ensemble II, Spalding Nix Fine Art, Gallery Residences, Atlanta, GA
- 2019 Flicker, South River Art Studios, Atlanta, Georgia
- 2019 Ensemble, Spalding Nix Fine Art, Atlanta, Georgia
- 2019 Losing Control: Guns, Government, and Group-Think, ATHICA: Athens Institute for Contemporary Art, Athens, Georgia, (Curator Arlette Hernandez)
- 2019 America Is…, National Juried Show, Touchstone Gallery, Washington, D.C.
- 2019 Sculpture on the Lawn, Outdoor Sculpture Exhibition, Aviation Community Cultural Center, Atlanta, Georgia
- 2019 Fine Arts Exhibition, Decatur Arts Alliance, The Dalton Gallery, Decatur, Georgia
- 2019 ArtFields, Exhibition and Competition, Lakeshore, South Carolina
- 2018 Women of Fire, Switzer Gallery, Pensacola State College, Pensacola, Florida
- 2018 Members Exhibition, Mid-South Sculpture Alliance, The Emporium Gallery, Knoxville, Tennessee
- 2018 Georgia Juried Arts Exhibition, Abernathy Arts Center, Atlanta, Georgia
- 2017 Metro Montage XV Show, Marietta Cobb Museum of Art, Marietta, Georgia
- 2015 North Charleston National Outdoor Sculpture Competition & Exhibition, North Charleston, South Carolina
- 2014 SPRING, Terminus Gallery, Atlanta, Georgia
- 2014 Metal Extinction: Using Metal to Honor and Make Permanent our Vanishing World, Saddleback College Gallery, Mission Viejo, California
- 2013 Coast to Coast by Post, Visual Arts Gallery, Department of Art, University of Wyoming, Laramie, Wyoming
- 2012 From The Fields, Il, Chiostro, Painting in Italy, Garda, Italy
- 2012 On the Land, Mid-South Sculpture Alliance, Outdoor Sculpture Exhibition, Chattanooga, Tennessee
- 2011 ELEVATE, Downtown Revitalizing Sculpture Exhibition, Atlanta, Georgia
- 2010 Recurrence, Art on the BeltLine, Atlanta, Georgia
- 2010 - Icarus International Kinetic Sculpture
- 2009 Abundance, DUMBO, Public Art Exhibition, Brooklyn, New York (Collaborative)
- 2009 - City of North Charleston Outdoor Sculpture
- 2009 The FriendSHIP Project, MOCA GA Project Space, Atlanta, Georgia (Collaborative)
- 2009 Movers and Shakers, MOCA GA, Atlanta, Georgia
- 2008 Entr'acte, Bush Contemporary Arts, Prospect 1, New Orleans, Louisiana
- 2008 Le Flash, Light, Performance, and Video, Castleberry Hill, Atlanta, Georgia
- 2008 Biennial, Madison-Morgan Cultural Center, Madison, Georgia (Juror: Sylvie Fortin)
- 2007 Sculptureyedrum, The Sequel to Breadth, Eyedrum, Atlanta, Georgia
- 2006 Ten Year Retrospective, Hungarian Multicultural Center, Eu Gallery, Budapest, Hungary
- 2006 Southeastern Juried Exhibition, Mobile Museum of Art, Mobile, Alabama
- 2006 The Bridge Show, The B Complex, Atlanta, Georgia
