= Marion Nicholl Rawson =

American artist (1878–1956)

- Born: Edna Marion Nicholl; June 24, 1878; Plainfield, New Jersey
- Died: December 4, 1956 (aged 78); Providence, Rhode Island
- Resting place: East Alstead Cemetery, East Alstead, New Hampshire; 43°7′49.18″N 72°16′49.48″W
- Citizenship: United States
- Education: Swarthmore College
- Occupations: Author and illustrator
- Spouse(s): Jonathan Ansel Rawson, Jr.

Marion Nicholl Rawson (June 24, 1878 – December 4, 1956) was an author, illustrator, artist and lecturer.

== Personal life ==
She was born Edna Marion Nicholl on June 24, 1878, and grew up in Scotch Plains, New Jersey. She first started sewing blocks for quilts at two years of age, carefully making two squares a day. She graduated from Swarthmore College in 1898 (Note: Edna Marion Nicholl was listed in the Class of 1897 in an 1898 publication by Swarthmore. But shown to have graduated in 1898 in a 1902 catalogue and the 1920 Register of Swarthmore College.) and then taught drawing in New York City.

On June 15, 1907, Edna Marion Nicholl married Jonathan Ansel Rawson, Jr., the son of Jonathan Ansel Rawson and Charlotte Fletcher Rawson. Jonathan was an Amherst College graduate and journalist. (Note: Jonathan Ansel Rawson, Jr. worked for the New York Tribune from 1895 to 1898. After working for the Business Publishing Company for one year, he worked for The Mining and Metallurgical Journal starting in 1899. He was the manager of the foreign department of New York Commercial.) From 1907 to 1910, Jonathan was in the export business. Then, he worked in publishing and journalism. During World War II, he did YMCA war work and was a member of the home defense organization, Riverside Reserves.

The couple had two children, Jonathan, who was born in 1910, and Priscilla.

In 1917, Marion Nicholl Rawson served on the Executive Committee of the National Birth Control League. She was on the Connecticut Women Suffrage Association's Executive Board in 1918. By 1920, the Rawsons lived in Sound Beach, Connecticut. They purchased an early 19th-century house in East Alstead, New Hampshire, a small town north of Keene and called it "the Little House." They maintained it in its original state, without electricity or running water, and she used it as a site of her historical researches and paintings. Throughout her life, Rawson spent the summers there. The Rawson homestead in the center of East Alstead had been in the family since 1782 but went to another branch of the family.

Rawson was left a widow when her husband died suddenly in Hamilton, New York on April 29, 1928. She died on December 4, 1956, and was buried in the East Alstead Cemetery, East Alstead, Cheshire County, New Hampshire.

== Career ==
After having married, Rawson worked as an author, historian, lecturer, watercolor painter and sketch artist. She sketched and painted all her life, holding frequent sales of her work in Bellows Falls, Vermont, Alstead, Providence and other places in New England. She was a long-time member of the Providence Art Club.

Rawson wrote and illustrated books on the homemade arts and crafts of the early American home, farm, shop and countryside, which she spent years researching. As a result, "she has rendered an invaluable service to those who are interested in the development of our early arts and have a hearty respect for the beautiful old treasures produced by craftsmen who loved their product and held in mind beauty of line and form as well as suitability of purpose."

One of her books, Sing, Old House, published in 1934, was written about old houses, some of which were built in the 1600s. In From Here to Yender and New Hampshire Borns a Town, Rawson captured New England phrases, like "always astern of the lighter" (dead last), "has no more suavity than a swine", "I just ate chagrin" (embarrassment over a faux pas), "I wish I had a neck as long as a cartrut" (good drink!) and "mud time" (very wet spring periods).

She later wrote the town history of Plainfield, New Jersey, Under the Blue Hills, and in one passage she reminisces of her early years at Tier's Pond: "Today there may be places as cool and inviting, but I doubt it ... a place where the heavy white dishes curled thickly about the edges; where the chairbacks curled in a well-remembered design; where the chocolate, strawberry and vanilla ice cream mounded itself up inches high ... it was simply our idea of Heaven." She left in manuscript at her death but published as part of the town's bicentennial celebration in 1974.

In 1947 Rawson gave a lecture on "Art of the Quakers" at the Friends Historical Association Annual Meeting.

== Published works ==
=== Books ===
Rawson authored and often illustrated her books:

- The Antiquer's Picture Book. Illustrations by the author. Dutton. 1940.
- Candle Days: The Story of Early American Arts and Implements. D. Appleton Century Company. 1940.
- Candleday Art. E.P. Dutton & Co., Inc. 1938.
- Country Auction. E.P. Dutton. 1929.
- Handwrought Ancestors. The Story of Early American Shops and Those who Worked Therein. Illustration by the author. New York. 1936.
- Forever the Farm. Illustration by the author. E. P. Dutton & Company, Incorporated. 1939.
- From Here to Yender: Early Trails and Highway Life. E.P. Dutton & Co., Inc. 1932.
- Little Old Mills. Johnson Reprint Corporation. 1970 [1935].
- New Hampshire Borns a Town (a history of Alstead, NH, called simply The Town, 1763-1883). Illustration by the author. E.P. Dutton and Company, Inc. 1942.
- The Old House Picture Book. Illustrations by the author. Dutton. 1941.
- Of the Earth Earthy: How our fathers, dwelt upon and wooed the earth. Illustration by the author. E. P. Dutton & Company, Inc. 1937.
- Sing, Old House: Hallmarks of True Restoration. Illustration by the author. E.P. Dutton & Company, Inc. 1934.
- Under the Blue Hills--Scotch Plains, New Jersey. Illustration by the author, left in manuscript at her death but published as part of the town's bicentennial celebration. Historical Society of Scotch Plains and Fanwood, in cooperation with the Scotch Plains American Revolution Bicentennial Committee. 1974.
- When Antiques Were Young: A Story of Early American Social Customs. E. P. Dutton & Co., Inc. 1931.

=== Articles ===
- "American Textile Designs", Review of Reviews and World's Work. Review of Reviews Corporation, 1919.
- "Ancient Peru in Textiles and Pottery," International Studio, New York Offices of the International Studio, 1919
