= George Washington Nesmith =

American judge (1800–1890)

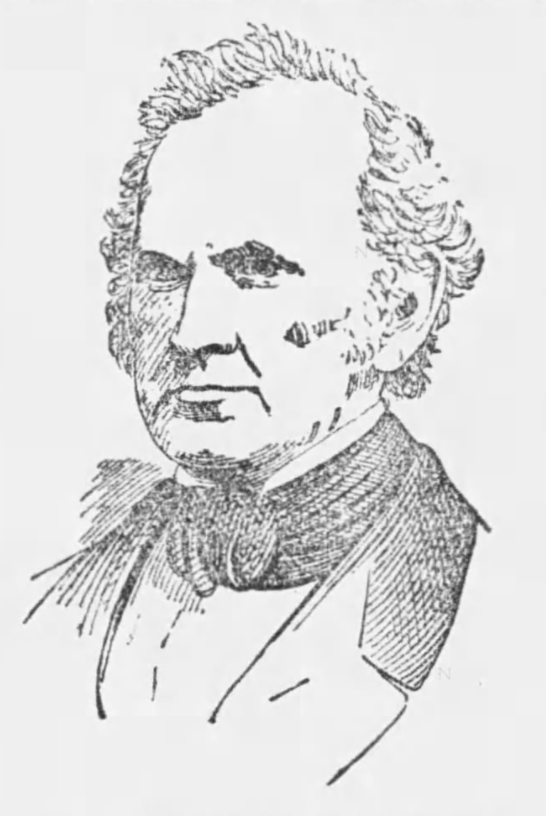
Drawing of Nesmith from The Boston Globe, January 1889.

George Washington Nesmith (October 1800 – May 2, 1890) was a justice of the New Hampshire Supreme Court from 1859 to 1870, and was later involved in the administration of the New Hampshire Agricultural College. He was described as being "an intimate friend of Daniel Webster", and as "one of New Hampshire's most noted jurists".

== Early life, education, and career ==
Nesmith graduated from Dartmouth College in 1820.

In the 1840 United States presidential election, he was selected as a presidential elector for William Henry Harrison, but although Harrison won the election, his opponent Martin Van Buren won the state of New Hampshire, and Nesmith was therefore not able to cast his vote as an elector.

His close friendship with Daniel Webster was "one of his most pleasant recollections", and he has long been quoted in matters relating to the history of the great expounder. He was noted as having "resembled Webster somewhat in personal appearance". Nesmith first saw Webster speak in 1818, while Nesmith was still a student at Dartmouth. He became personally acquainted with Webster around 1824, when brothers Daniel and Ezekiel Webster visited a farm that had been their childhood haunt, and over the following years, Nesmith and Webster became very close friends. In 1858, Nesmith wrote a well-received biography of Webster's father, Ebenezer Webster.

== Judicial service and academia ==
In 1859 he was appointed one of the judges of the supreme court to a seat vacated by the resignation of Ira A. Eastman. Nesmith remained on the court until October, 1870, when, having reached the age of 70, he was retired.

He was a trustee and afterward president of the New Hampshire Agricultural College, having been selected in 1893 by the Board of Trustees of Dartmouth College to participate in that effort. His political career was devoted to the Whig and Republican parties. His presence on "commencement day" at Dartmouth was one of the notable features of that occasion in his later years. His activity on the verge of 90 years was surprising.

In 1889, Nesmith was again selected as a presidential elector, for Benjamin Harrison in the 1888 United States presidential election. This time, Nesmith's candidate won both the national election and the state of New Hampshire, and Nesmith was selected to chair the gathering of electors for the state in casting their votes for Harrison.

Only a few weeks before his death, Nesmith contributed an article on "Oratory" to The Dartmouth. He died in the hamlet of Franklin Falls, New York, after a short illness. He was nearly 90 years old.

Political offices
Preceded by Ira Allen Eastman	Justice of the New Hampshire Supreme Court; 1859–1870	Succeeded by William S. Ladd
