= Daniel M. Durell =

American politician

Daniel Meserve Durell

Member of the U.S. House of Representatives from New Hampshire's at-large district
- In office March 4, 1807 – March 3, 1809
- Preceded by: Thomas W. Thompson
- Succeeded by: John Curtis Chamberlain

Member of the New Hampshire House of Representatives
- In office 1816–1817

Personal details
- Born: July 20, 1769 Lee, Province of New Hampshire, British America
- Died: April 29, 1841 (aged 71) Dover, New Hampshire, U.S.
- Resting place: Pine Hill Cemetery
- Party: Democratic-Republican
- Spouse: Elizabeth Wentworth
- Profession: Attorney; Politician

Daniel Meserve Durell (July 20, 1769 – April 29, 1841) was an American attorney and Democratic-Republican politician in the U.S. state of New Hampshire. He served as a member of the United States House of Representatives and as a member of the New Hampshire House of Representatives in the early 1800s.

== Early life and career ==
Durell was born in Lee in the Province of New Hampshire, the son of Nicholas and Abigail Durell. He attended Phillips Exeter Academy, and graduated from Dartmouth College in 1794. He studied law, was admitted to the bar in 1797, and began practicing law in Dover, New Hampshire.

He was elected as a Democratic-Republican to the Tenth Congress, serving from March 4, 1807 – March 3, 1809. He served as a member of the New Hampshire House of Representatives in 1816. He was Chief Justice of the district court of common pleas from 1816 to 1821, and United States attorney for the district of New Hampshire from 1830 to 1834.

Following his years of public service, Durell resumed the practice of law. He died in Dover on April 29, 1841, and is interred in Pine Hill Cemetery.

== Personal life ==
Durell married Elizabeth Wentworth on June 1, 1800. They had several children including Mary Jane Durell, Sarah Adeline Durell, Elizabeth Salter Durell, Nicholas St. John Durell, Charles James Fix Durell, Margarett Ann Durell, Edward Henry Durell and George Clinton Durell.

U.S. House of Representatives
| Preceded by Thomas W. Thompson | Member of the U.S. House of Representatives from New Hampshire's at-large congressional district 1809–1811 | Succeeded by John C. Chamberlain |
