= Arthur Livermore =

American judge

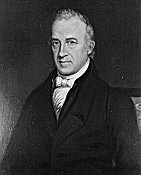

Member of the U.S. House of Representatives from New Hampshire's at-large district
- In office March 4, 1817 – March 3, 1821
- Preceded by: Daniel Webster
- Succeeded by: Thomas Whipple, Jr.
- In office March 4, 1823 – March 3, 1825
- Preceded by: Nathaniel Upham
- Succeeded by: Titus Brown

Member of the New Hampshire Senate
- In office 1821–1822

Member of the New Hampshire House of Representatives
- In office 1794–1795

Personal details
- Born: July 29, 1766 Londonderry, Province of New Hampshire, British America
- Died: July 1, 1853 (aged 86) Campton, New Hampshire, U.S.
- Resting place: Trinity Churchyard, Holderness, New Hampshire
- Citizenship: U.S.
- Party: Democratic-Republican; Adams-Clay Republican
- Spouse: Louisa Bliss Livermore
- Relations: Samuel Livermore; Edward St. Loe Livermore
- Children: Edward Livermore; Samuel Livermore; Horace Livermore
- Profession: Lawyer; Politician; Judge

Arthur Livermore (July 29, 1766 – July 1, 1853) was an American politician and attorney who served as a United States representative from New Hampshire.

== Early life and education ==
Born in Londonderry in the Province of New Hampshire, Livermore received classical instruction from his parents and also studied law. Later, he was admitted to the bar and commenced practice in Concord in 1792 and then moved to Chester the following year.

== Career ==
Livermore was a member of the New Hampshire House of Representatives in 1794 and 1795 and the solicitor for Rockingham County 1796–1798. After moving to Holderness in 1798, he became an associate justice of the superior court from 1798 to 1809 and chief justice from 1809 to 1813. He served as a presidential elector on the Federalist ticket in 1800 and as an associate justice of the New Hampshire Supreme Court from 1813 to 1816.

Elected as a Democratic-Republican as United States Representative for New Hampshire to the Fifteenth and Sixteenth Congresses, Livermore served from March 4, 1817 – March 3, 1821. He served as chairman of both the Committee on the Post Office and Post Roads (Fifteenth and Sixteenth Congresses) and the Committee on Expenditures in the Post Office Department (Sixteenth Congress). In 1818 he introduced a proposal to eliminate slavery by Constitutional amendment.

He was an unsuccessful candidate for reelection in 1822 to the Seventeenth Congress. He served in the New Hampshire Senate in 1821 and 1822, judge of probate for Grafton County in 1822 and 1823.

Livermore was elected as an Adams-Clay Republican representing New Hampshire to the Eighteenth Congress and served from March 4, 1823, to March 3, 1825. He was not a candidate for renomination in 1824. After leaving Congress, he was the chief justice of the court of common pleas from 1825 to 1832, moved to Campton, New Hampshire in 1827, and was a trustee of Holmes Plymouth Academy from 1808 to 1826.

== Personal life ==
Livermore was the son of Samuel Livermore, and the brother of Edward St. Loe Livermore, both of whom served in the United States Congress. He married Louisa Bliss, daughter of Major Joseph Bliss.

Shortly before his 87th birthday, Livermore died in the town of Campton, New Hampshire, on July 1, 1853. He is interred at Trinity Churchyard, Holderness, New Hampshire.

Livermore was allegedly involved in an altercation with eccentric businessman Timothy Dexter, who claimed Livermore beat him after borrowing $200 and refusing to pay it back.

Party political offices
| Preceded by Ichabod Bartlett | National Republican nominee for Governor of New Hampshire; 1833 | Succeeded by None |
U.S. House of Representatives
| Preceded by Daniel Webster | Member of the U.S. House of Representatives from New Hampshire's at-large congressional district 1817-1821 | Succeeded by Thomas Whipple, Jr. |
U.S. House of Representatives
| Preceded by Nathaniel Upham | Member of the U.S. House of Representatives from New Hampshire's at-large congressional district 1823-1825 | Succeeded by Titus Brown |
