= Thomas Whipple Jr. =

American politician (1787–1835)

Thomas Whipple Jr. (1787 – January 23, 1835) was a U.S. representative from New Hampshire.

Born in Lebanon, New Hampshire, Whipple completed preparatory studies before moving to Warren, New Hampshire, in 1811. He studied medicine in Haverhill and Hanover, New Hampshire, graduating from Dartmouth College in 1814. He commenced practice in Wentworth and served as member of the New Hampshire House of Representatives between 1818 and 1820.

Whipple was elected to the Seventeenth and the three succeeding Congresses (March 4, 1821 – March 3, 1829). After his time in office he resumed the practice of medicine and died in Wentworth, New Hampshire, on January 23, 1835. He was interred in Wentworth Village Cemetery.

U.S. House of Representatives
| Preceded by Arthur Livermore | Member of the U.S. House of Representatives from New Hampshire's at-large congressional district 1821-1829 | Succeeded by Henry Hubbard |
