= John Brodhead (New Hampshire politician) =

American politician

Member of the U.S. House of Representatives from New Hampshire's At-Large district
- In office March 4, 1829 – March 3, 1833
- Preceded by: Ichabod Bartlett
- Succeeded by: Benning M. Bean

Member of the New Hampshire Senate
- In office 1817–1827

Personal details
- Born: October 5, 1770 Lower Smithfield, Province of Pennsylvania, British America
- Died: April 7, 1838 (aged 67) Newfields, New Hampshire, U.S.
- Resting place: Locust Cemetery; Newfields, New Hampshire
- Citizenship: U.S.
- Party: Jacksonian
- Spouse: Mary Dodge Brodhead
- Children: Daniel Dodge Brodhead; John Montgomery Brodhead; Elizabeth Harrison Brodhead Norris; Anne Mudge Brodhead Ewens; Joseph Crawford Brodhead; Mehitabel Smith Brodhead Weeks; George Hamilton Brodhead; Mary Rebecca Brodhead Pike; Olive Brodhead; Thornton Fleming Brodhead; Josiah Adams Brodhead; Almena Cutter Brodhead.
- Profession: Minister; Politician

John Brodhead (October 5, 1770 – April 7, 1838) was a Methodist minister, an American politician and a U.S. Representative from New Hampshire.

== Early life ==
Born in Lower Smithfield in the Province of Pennsylvania, Brodhead attended the common schools and Stroudsburg (Pennsylvania) Academy. He studied theology and was ordained a Methodist minister in 1794 remaining active in ministerial service for forty-four years.

== Career ==
Brodhead moved in 1796 to New England, where he became supervisor of Methodist societies in the Connecticut Valley. He settled in Canaan, New Hampshire, in 1801, then moved to Newfields Village, Newmarket, New Hampshire, in 1809. From 1810 to about 1823, he occupied the parsonage and preached in the parish church.

A member of the New Hampshire Senate, 1817–1827, Brodhead also officiated as chaplain of the New Hampshire House of Representatives in 1825.

Elected as a Jacksonian to the Twenty-first and Twenty-second Congresses, Brodhead served as United States Representative for the state of New Hampshire from March 4, 1829 – March 3, 1833. He declined to be a candidate for renomination in 1832 and resumed his ministerial duties.

== Death ==
Brodhead died in Newfields, Rockingham County, New Hampshire, on April 7, 1838 (age 67 years, 184 days). He is interred at Locust Grove Cemetery, Newfields, New Hampshire.

== Family life ==
On August 17, 1801, Brodhead, son of Luke and Elizabeth Harrison Brodhead, married Mary Dodge, daughter of Thomas and Ruth Giddings Dodge. They had 12 children; six sons and six daughters.

U.S. House of Representatives
Preceded by Ichabod Bartlett	Representative of the At-Large Congressional District of New Hampshire; 1829—1833	Succeeded by Benning M. Bean
