= Sidney Gardiner =

American silversmith (1787–1827)

- Born: July 23, 1787
- Died: May 1827 (aged 39–40)

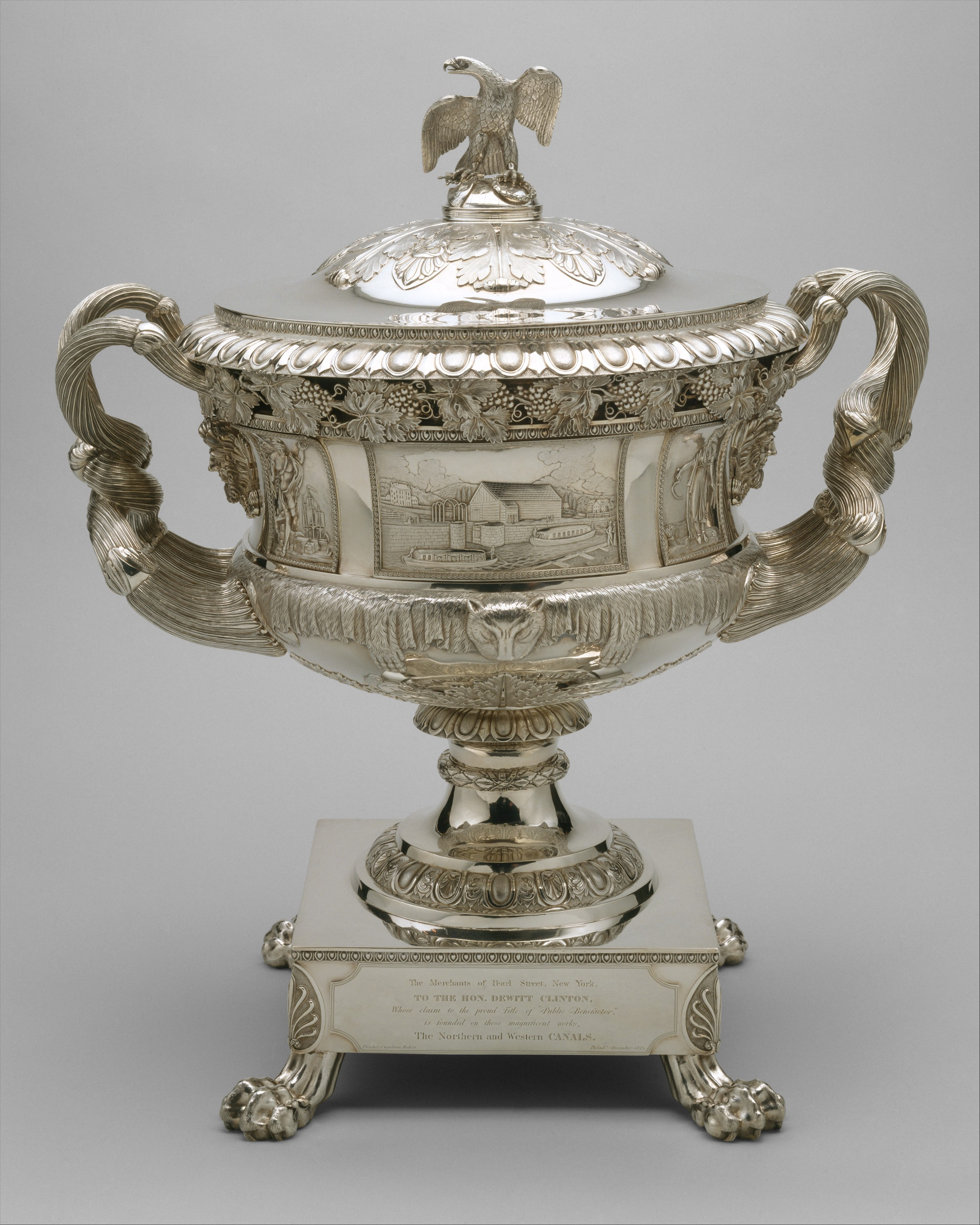
Presentation vase for DeWitt Clinton by Fletcher & Gardiner, 1824

Sidney Gardiner (July 23, 1787 - May 1827) was an American silversmith and merchant, active in Boston and Philadelphia. His firm of Fletcher & Gardiner was nationally renowned.

Fletcher was born in Mattituck, New York. He migrated to Boston, where his family had long-standing connections. In 1803 he and Thomas Fletcher, then in their teens, formed a partnership that comprised silversmithing and selling fancy hardware at 43 Marlboro Street. In 1811 their firm of Fletcher & Gardiner moved to Philadelphia, with a shop at Third and Chestnut Street, where Gardiner worked until his death while traveling in Veracruz, Mexico. In 1824 he was a founding member of the Franklin Institute.

Silver by Fletcher & Gardiner is collected in the Metropolitan Museum of Art, the Harvard Art Museums, Winterthur Museum, and Yale University Art Gallery. His papers are archived in the Winterthur Museum.
