= 1823 New Hampshire gubernatorial election =

- March 11, 1823
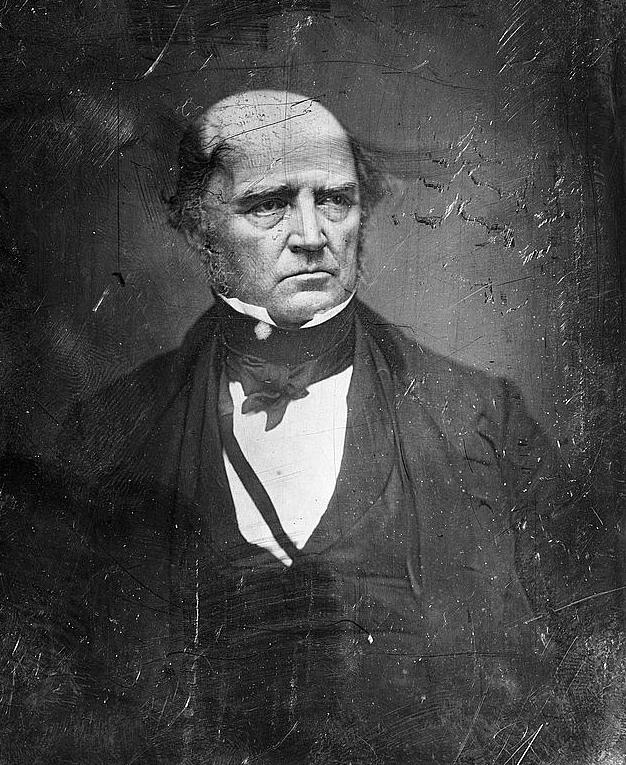

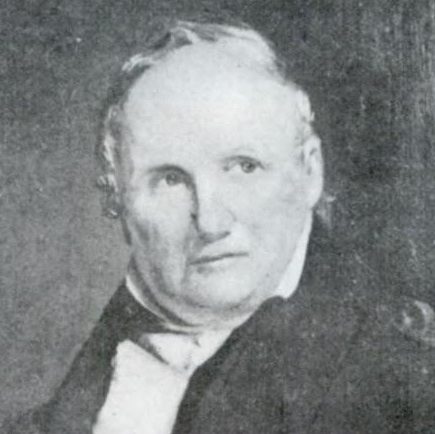
Nominee	Levi Woodbury	Samuel Dinsmoor
Party	Democratic-Republican	Democratic-Republican
Popular vote	16,985	12,718
Percentage	56.72%	42.47%
- County results Woodbury: 50–60% 60–70% 70–80% Dinsmoor: 50–60% 60–70%
Governor before election
Samuel Bell
Democratic-Republican
Elected Governor
Levi Woodbury
Democratic-Republican

The 1823 New Hampshire gubernatorial election was held on March 11, 1823.

Incumbent Democratic-Republican Governor Samuel Bell did not run for re-election to a fifth term in office.

Levi Woodbury defeated Samuel Dinsmoor with 56.72% of the vote.

== Democratic-Republican nomination ==
=== Candidates ===
- William Badger, High Sheriff of Strafford County, former President of the New Hampshire Senate
- Ezra Bartlett, unsuccessful candidate for U.S. Representative in 1800 and 1804
- Josiah Butler, incumbent U.S. Representative
- Samuel Dinsmoor, former U.S. Representative
- Jonathan Harvey, President of the New Hampshire Senate
- Arthur Livermore, former U.S. Representative
- David L. Morril, incumbent U.S. Senator
- William Pickering, incumbent Treasurer of New Hampshire

=== Results ===
The Democratic-Republican caucus met at Concord on June 21, 1822.

The results of the balloting were as follows:

	Gubernatorial Ballot	
	1st	2nd
Samuel Dinsmoor	72	92
Arthur Livermore	29	27
Jonathan Harvey	27	27
David L. Morril	18	7
William Pickering	8	0
Ezra Bartlett	5	1
William Badger	1	0
Josiah Butler	1	0

== General election ==
=== Candidates ===
- Samuel Dinsmoor, former U.S. Representative
- Levi Woodbury, Associate Justice of the New Hampshire Superior Court of Judicature

Some 20th Century sources record Woodbury as an Independent Republican. Woodbury stood at the invitation of a convention of Portsmouth Republicans. Contemporary sources record both candidates as Republicans; Dinsmoor as a supporter of William H. Crawford for the U.S. Presidency, and Woodbury a supporter of John Quincy Adams. (However, Woodbury would be elected to the U.S. Senate in 1825 as a Jacksonian)

=== Results ===
1823 New Hampshire gubernatorial election (Note: Some sources give slightly different results. The result given is taken from the New Hampshire Senate Journal.)
Party	Candidate	Votes	%	±%
Democratic-Republican	Levi Woodbury	16,985	56.72%	
Democratic-Republican	Samuel Dinsmoor	12,718	42.47%	
Scattering		240	0.80%	
Majority		4,267	14.25%	
Turnout		29,943		
Democratic-Republican hold		Swing		

== Bibliography ==
- Cole, Donald B. (1970). Jacksonian Democracy in New Hampshire, 1800-1851. Cambridge, Massachusetts: Harvard University Press. ISBN 0-674-46990-9.
