= 1833 New Hampshire gubernatorial election =

- March 12, 1833
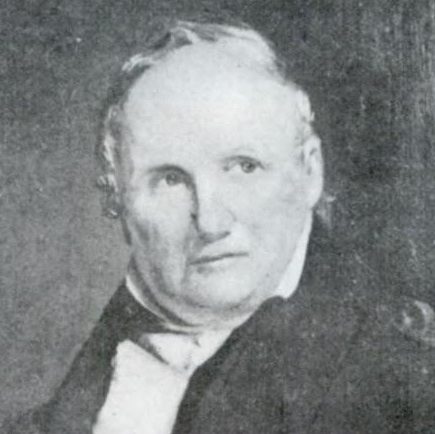

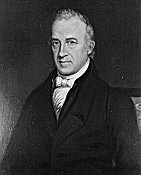
Nominee	Samuel Dinsmoor	Arthur Livermore
Party	Democratic	National Republican
Popular vote	28,277	3,959
Percentage	84.47%	11.83%
- County results Dinsmoor: 70–80% 80–90% 90–100%
Governor before election
Samuel Dinsmoor
Democratic
Elected Governor
Samuel Dinsmoor
Democratic

The 1833 New Hampshire gubernatorial election was held on March 12, 1833.

Democratic nominee Samuel Dinsmoor defeated National Republican nominee Arthur Livermore with 84.47% of the vote.

== General election ==
=== Candidates ===
- Samuel Dinsmoor, Democratic, incumbent Governor
- Arthur Livermore, National Republican, former U.S. Representative

=== Results ===
1833 New Hampshire gubernatorial election (Note: Some sources give Dinsmoor's total as 28,210, 28,270 or 28,279. The New Hampshire Senate Journal gives Dinsmoor's total as 28,270 but the sum of all candidates' votes adds up seven short of the total votes given.)
Party	Candidate	Votes	%	±%
Democratic	Samuel Dinsmoor (incumbent)	28,277	84.47%	
National Republican	Arthur Livermore	3,959	11.83%	
Scattering		1,240	3.70%	
Majority		24,318	72.64%	
Turnout		33,476		
Democratic hold		Swing		
