= Thomas Fletcher (silversmith) =

American silversmith (1787–1866)

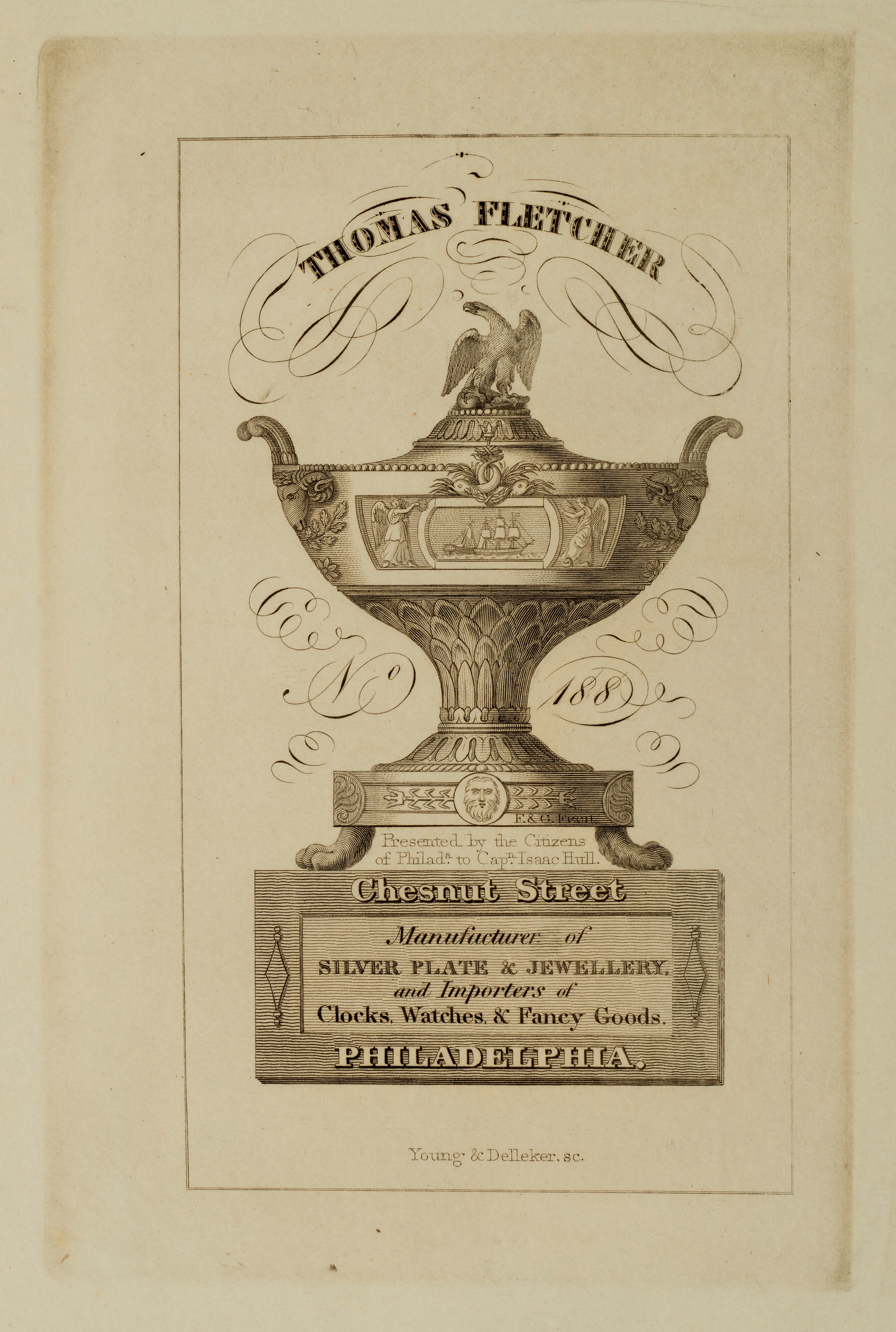
Urn by Thomas Fletcher, commemorating the battle of the USS Constitution vs HMS Guerriere, advertisement c. 1812

Thomas Charles Fletcher (April 3, 1787 - November 14, 1866) was a prominent American silversmith and merchant, active in Boston and Philadelphia. His firm of Fletcher & Gardiner was nationally renowned.

Fletcher was born in Alstead, New Hampshire to Timothy Fletcher and Hannah Fosdick. In 1808 we went into business with Sidney Gardiner in Boston, and was listed as a jeweler in the 1809 Boston directory. In 1811 they moved their firm, Fletcher & Gardiner, to Philadelphia. By 1812, they had a sufficient reputation to win commissions for several trophies commemorating American victories in the War of 1812. In 1815 Fletcher visited England and France to buy retail merchandise. The partnership continued until Gardiner's death in 1827, when Fletcher brought Calvin W. Bennett into the business. The firm suffered financial reversals in the 1830s, and in 1842 was repossessed by creditors. Fletcher subsequently ran a boarding house in Philadelphia until 1850, when he moved to Delanco Township, New Jersey. He lived in Delanco until his death.

Silver by Fletcher and company is collected in the Metropolitan Museum of Art, the Harvard Art Museums, Winterthur Museum, and Yale University Art Gallery. His papers are archived in the Winterthur Museum.
