= John Curtis Chamberlain =

American politician

Member of the New Hampshire House of Representatives
- In office 1818–1819

Member of the U.S. House of Representatives from New Hampshire's at-large district
- In office March 4, 1809 – March 3, 1811
- Preceded by: Daniel Meserve Durell
- Succeeded by: Samuel Dinsmoor

Member of the New Hampshire House of Representatives
- In office 1802–1804

Personal details
- Born: June 5, 1772 Worcester, Province of Massachusetts Bay, British America
- Died: December 8, 1834 (aged 62) Utica, New York, U.S.
- Resting place: Mt. Albion Cemetery, Albion, Orleans County, New York, USA
- Party: Federalist
- Spouse: Nancy Hubbard Chamberlain
- Children: Mary Chamberlain; Nancy Hubbard Chamberlain; John Chamberlain; Hubbard Chamberlain; William Chamberlain; Elizabeth Jane Chamberlain; Richard Hubbard Chamberlain; Harriett Prudence Chamberlain; George Chamberlain
- Parent(s): John Chamberlain; Mary Curtis Chamberlain
- Education: Harvard University

John Curtis Chamberlain (June 5, 1772 – December 8, 1834) was an American attorney and Federalist politician in the U.S. state of New Hampshire who served as a member of the United States House of Representatives and as a member of the New Hampshire House of Representatives.

== Early life ==
Chamberlain was born in Worcester in the Province of Massachusetts Bay. He graduated from Harvard University in 1793. He read law, being superintended by Benjamin West of Charleston. He was admitted to the bar in 1796 and began practicing law in Alstead, New Hampshire.

== Career ==
Chamberlain wrote a series of essays as The Hermit which appeared for a year or more in "The Farmer's Museum" beginning in the summer of 1796. He also was ghost writer for Mrs. Susanna Willard Johnson's "A Narrative of the Captivity of Mrs. Johnson" in 1796. He was a member of the New Hampshire House of Representatives from 1802 to 1804. In 1804, he moved to Charlestown, New Hampshire becoming partners with Benjamin West until West's death in 1817.

Elected as a Federalist to the Eleventh Congress, Chamberlain served as United States Representative for the state of New Hampshire from March 4, 1809, to March 3, 1811. After leaving Congress he resumed the practice of law. He served as a member of the New Hampshire House of Representatives again in 1818. He continued his practice until he moved in 1826 to Utica, New York.

Chamberlain was elected a member of the American Antiquarian Society in 1815.

== Death ==
Chamberlain died in Utica, Oneida County, New York on December 8, 1834 (age 62 years, 186 days). He is interred at Mt. Albion Cemetery, Albion, Orleans County, New York.

== Family life ==
Son of John and Mary Curtis Chamberlain, he married Nancy Hubbard on December 29, 1797; and they had nine children, Mary, Nancy Hubbard, John, Hubbard, William, Elizabeth Jane, Richard Hubbard, Harriett Prudence, and George.

New Hampshire House of Representatives
| Preceded by | Member of the New Hampshire House of Representatives; 1818-1819 | Succeeded by |
U.S. House of Representatives
| Preceded by Daniel Meserve Durell | Member of the U.S. House of Representatives from New Hampshire; 1809-1811 | Succeeded by Samuel Dinsmoor |
New Hampshire House of Representatives
| Preceded by | Member of the New Hampshire House of Representatives; 1802–1804 | Succeeded by |
