= Benning M. Bean =

American politician (1782–1866)

Benning Moulton Bean
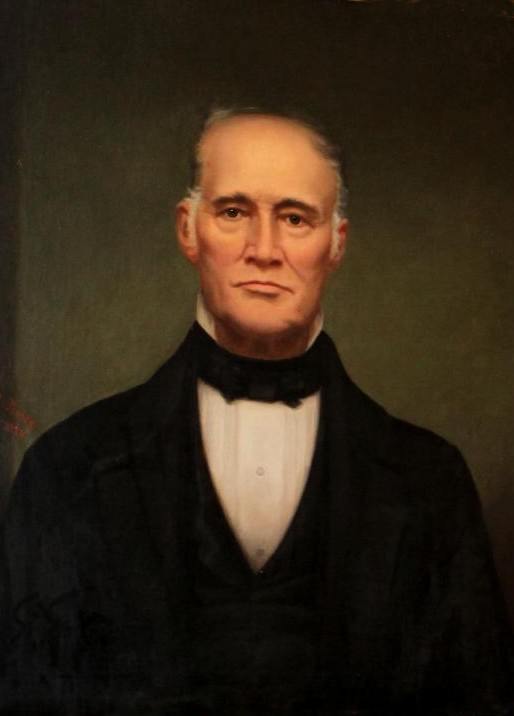

Member of the U.S. House of Representatives from New Hampshire's At-Large district
- In office March 4, 1833 – March 3, 1837
- Preceded by: John Brodhead
- Succeeded by: Charles G. Atherton

Member of the New Hampshire Senate
- In office 1831–1832

Member of the New Hampshire House of Representatives
- In office 1827–1827

Member of the New Hampshire Senate
- In office 1824–1826

Member of the New Hampshire House of Representatives
- In office 1815–1823

Personal details
- Born: January 9, 1782 Moultonborough, New Hampshire, U.S.
- Died: February 6, 1866 (aged 84) Moultonborough, New Hampshire, U.S.
- Resting place: Bean Cemetery; Moultonborough, New Hampshire
- Party: Jacksonian
- Spouse(s): Eliza Ramsey Bean; Lydia Adams Bean
- Children: John Q. A. Bean; Benjamin F. Bean; A. A. Bean; George L. Bean; William E. Bean; Hannah J. Bean
- Profession: Farmer; Politician

Benning Moulton Bean (January 9, 1782 – February 6, 1866) was an American farmer and politician. He served as a United States representative from New Hampshire, as a member of the New Hampshire Senate, and as a member of the New Hampshire House of Representatives.

== Early life and career ==
Born in Moultonborough, New Hampshire, Bean was the son of Moody Bean. He attended public schools, received private tutoring and became involved in teaching and agricultural pursuits.

== Political career ==
He served as Selectman for Moultonborough from 1811 to 1829 and from 1832 to 1838. He was Justice of the Peace in 1816, and trustee of Sandwich Academy in 1824. A member of the New Hampshire House of Representatives from 1815 to 1823, Bean also served in the New Hampshire Senate from 1824 to 1826. He served as a member of the New Hampshire House of Representatives again in 1827. In 1829, he was member of the Governor's council.

Bean served in the New Hampshire Senate again in 1831 and 1832, and was president of the State Senate in 1832. He was elected as a Jacksonian candidate to the Twenty-third and Twenty-fourth Congresses, serving in Congress March 4, 1833 – March 3, 1837. During his time in Congress, Bean was an advocate for temperance and helped form the Congressional Temperance Society with George N. Briggs in 1833. He served as president of the society. He declined to be a candidate for renomination in 1836, and resumed teaching and agricultural pursuits in Moultonborough,

== Death ==
Bean died in Moultonborough, Carroll County, New Hampshire on February 6, 1866 (age 84 years, 28 days). He is interred at Bean Cemetery in Moultonborough.

== Personal life ==
On May 31, 1812, Bean married Eliza Ramsey. They had one daughter who died in childhood. After Eliza's death, he married Lydia Adams on October 30, 1817. They had six sons and four daughters together, including John Q. A. Bean, Benjamin F. Bean, A. A. Bean, George L. Bean, William E. Bean and Hannah J. Bean.

U.S. House of Representatives
Preceded by John Brodhead	Member of the U.S. House of Representatives from New Hampshire's at-large congressional district 1833 – 1837	Succeeded by Charles G. Atherton
