= Titus Brown =

American politician (1786–1849)

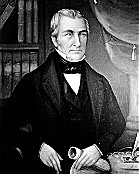

Member of the U.S. House of Representatives from New Hampshire's At-Large district
- In office March 4, 1825 – March 3, 1829
- Preceded by: Matthew Harvey
- Succeeded by: Joseph Hammons

Personal details
- Born: February 11, 1786 Alstead, New Hampshire, U.S.
- Died: January 29, 1849 (aged 62) Francestown, New Hampshire, U.S.
- Resting place: Mill Village Cemetery, Francestown
- Party: Adams Party
- Spouse: Jerusha Cadwell Hutchinson Brown
- Children: 2
- Education: Middlebury College
- Profession: Attorney; Politician

Titus Brown (February 11, 1786 – January 29, 1849) was an American politician and a United States Representative from New Hampshire.

== Early life ==
Born in Alstead, New Hampshire, Brown graduated from Middlebury College in Vermont in 1811. He then studied law; was admitted to the bar and commenced practice in Reading, Vermont in 1814.

== Career ==
Brown moved to Francestown, New Hampshire in 1817 and continued the practice of law. He was a member of the New Hampshire House of Representatives 1820–1825, and was the Solicitor of Hillsborough County 1823–1825 and 1829–1834.

Elected as an Adams Republican candidate to the Nineteenth and Twentieth Congresses, Brown was United States Representative for the state of New Hampshire from (March 4, 1825 – March 3, 1829). In 1829, he was not a candidate for reelection. After leaving Congress, he was a member of the New Hampshire Senate and served as its president in 1842. He was school superintendent for many years in Francestown and also was the chairman of the boards of bank and railroad commissioners at the time of his death.

== Death ==
Brown died in Francestown, Hillsborough County, New Hampshire, on January 29, 1849 (age 62 years, 353 days). He is interred at Mill Village Cemetery, Francestown, New Hampshire.

== Family life ==
Son of Elias Jr. and Rebecca Keyes Brown, he married Jerusha Cadwell Hutchinson, and they had two children Linsley Keyes Brown and Emily Hutchinson Brown.

== External list ==
- United States Congress. "Titus Brown (id: B000945)". Biographical Directory of the United States Congress.
- Titus Brown (1786–1849)

U.S. House of Representatives
Preceded by Matthew Harvey	Member of the U.S. House of Representatives from New Hampshire; 1825 – 1829	Succeeded by Joseph Hammons
