= Ira Allen Eastman =

American politician

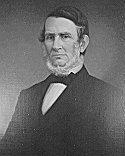

Member of the New Hampshire House of Representatives
- In office 1836–1838

Member of the U.S. House of Representatives from New Hampshire's at-large district
- In office March 4, 1839 – March 3, 1843
- Preceded by: Samuel Cushman
- Succeeded by: John P. Hale

Justice of the New Hampshire Supreme Court
- In office 1855–1859
- Succeeded by: George W. Nesmith

Personal details
- Born: January 1, 1809 Gilmanton, New Hampshire
- Died: March 21, 1881 (aged 72) Manchester, New Hampshire
- Resting place: Valley Cemetery
- Party: Democratic
- Spouse: Jane Quackenbush
- Relations: Nehemiah Eastman
- Children: Clarence Eastman; Anna Q Eastman
- Profession: Attorney; Politician

Ira Allen Eastman (January 1, 1809 – March 21, 1881) was an American manufacturer and Democratic politician in the U.S. state of New Hampshire. He served as a member of the United States House of Representatives and as a member of the New Hampshire House of Representatives in the 1800s.

== Early life ==
Eastman was born in Gilmanton, New Hampshire, the son of Stephen and Hannah Eastman. He attended the local schools and Gilmanton Academy before graduating from Dartmouth College in Hanover, New Hampshire, in 1829. He read law and was admitted to the bar in 1832. He began practicing law in Troy, New Hampshire.

== Political career ==
Eastman returned to Gilmanton in 1834 and continued the practice of law. He served as clerk of the New Hampshire House of Representatives in 1835. He was as member of the State House of Representatives from 1836 to 1838, and served as speaker of the State House in 1837 and 1838. He was Register of Probate for Strafford County from 1836 to 1839.

Eastman was elected as a Democrat to the Twenty-sixth and Twenty-seventh Congresses, serving from March 4, 1839 - March 3, 1843. He served as chairman of the United States House Committee on Revisal and Unfinished Business during the Twenty-seventh Congress. He was not a candidate for renomination in 1842.

After leaving Congress, he served as judge of the New Hampshire Court of Common Pleas from 1844 to 1849. He served as associate justice of the New Hampshire Supreme Court from 1849 to 1855, and as justice of the New Hampshire Supreme Court from 1855 to 1859. In 1858, he was honored with a L.L.D. degree from Dartmouth College, and in 1859 he was chosen trustee of Dartmouth.

After resigning from judicial service, Eastman resumed the practice of law. He practiced law in Concord and Manchester. Eastman was an unsuccessful Democratic candidate for Governor of New Hampshire in 1863 and for United States Senator in 1866.

Eastman died on March 21, 1881, in Manchester and is interred in Valley Cemetery.

== Personal life ==
Eastman was married to Jane Quackenbush and they had two children, Clarence and Anna Q. He was the nephew of Nehemiah Eastman, a United States Representative from New Hampshire.

Party political offices
Preceded by George Stark	Democratic nominee for Governor of New Hampshire; 1863	Succeeded by Edward W. Harrington
U.S. House of Representatives
Preceded by Samuel Cushman	Member of the U.S. House of Representatives from New Hampshire's at-large congressional district 1839-1843	Succeeded by John P. Hale
