= Samuel Dinsmoor =

American politician (1766–1835)

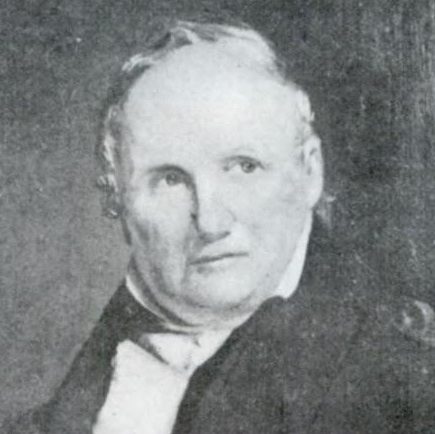

14th Governor of New Hampshire
- In office June 2, 1831 – June 5, 1834
- Preceded by: Joseph M. Harper (acting)
- Succeeded by: William Badger

Member of the U.S. House of Representatives from New Hampshire's At-large district
- In office March 4, 1811 – March 3, 1813
- Preceded by: John Curtis Chamberlain
- Succeeded by: Samuel Smith

Personal details
- Born: July 1, 1766 Windham, Province of New Hampshire, British America
- Died: March 15, 1835 (aged 68) Keene, New Hampshire, U.S.
- Resting place: Washington Street Cemetery; Keene, New Hampshire
- Party: Democratic-Republican
- Spouse: Mary Boyd Reid Dinsmoor
- Relations: General George Reid
- Children: 3, including Samuel Dinsmoor Jr.
- Education: Dartmouth College
- Profession: Teacher, lawyer, politician, banker

Samuel Dinsmoor (July 1, 1766 – March 15, 1835) was an American teacher, lawyer, banker and politician from New Hampshire. He served as the 14th governor of New Hampshire and as a member of the United States House of Representatives.

== Early life ==
Born in 1766 in Windham in the Province of New Hampshire, Dinsmoor was the son of William and Elizabeth (Cochran) Dinsmoor. He graduated from Dartmouth College in 1789, worked as a teacher, studied law and was admitted to the bar. He established a law practice in Keene, New Hampshire, where he was appointed as Postmaster in 1808. He helped organize the Keene light infantry and was the infantry commander.

== Political career ==
Elected as a Democratic-Republican, Dinsmoor represented New Hampshire in the United States House of Representatives during the Twelfth Congress, serving from March 4, 1811, to March 3, 1813. Dinsmoor was an 1820 presidential elector, and served on New Hampshire Governor's Council in 1821. He was a commission member that negotiated and established the boundary line between Massachusetts and New Hampshire in 1825. He also served as state court judge in New Hampshire from 1823 to 1831.

Securing the Democratic gubernatorial nomination, Dinsmoor was elected Governor by a popular vote in 1831. He was reelected to a second term in 1832, and to a third term in 1833, serving from 1831 to 1834. During his tenure, new manufacturing businesses were incorporated, railroads and banks flourished, and the first free public library in the United States was established in Peterborough.

During his governorship, he also made the first official recommendation to establish a state asylum for the insane to remove the insane from prisons, dungeons, and cages. In 1838, a bill for the establishment of an asylum was finally passed by the state. He retired from political life and entered the private sector, serving as the first president of the Ashuelot Bank in Keene. He served in that position until his death.

== Death ==
Dinsmoor died in Keene, Cheshire County, New Hampshire, on March 15, 1835 (age 68 years, 257 days). He is interred at Washington Street Cemetery in Keene, New Hampshire.

== Personal life ==
Dinsmoor was the grandson of Robert and Margaret (Orr) Dinsmoor who settled in Nutfield in 1723. In 1798, he married Mary Boyd Reid, daughter of General George Reid and Molly (Woodburn) Reid.

His son was Samuel Dinsmoor Jr., the 22nd Governor of New Hampshire.

Party political offices
Preceded by Samuel Bell	Democratic-Republican nominee for Governor of New Hampshire; 1823	Succeeded by Levi Woodbury
Preceded by Matthew Harvey	Democratic nominee for Governor of New Hampshire; 1831, 1832, 1833	Succeeded by William Badger
U.S. House of Representatives
Preceded by John Curtis Chamberlain	Member of the House of Representatives from New Hampshire's at-large (Seat 2) congressional district 1811–1813	Succeeded by Samuel Smith
Political offices
Preceded by Joseph M. Harper; Acting	Governor of New Hampshire; 1831–1834	Succeeded by William Badger
