= Alstead, New Hampshire =

- Town
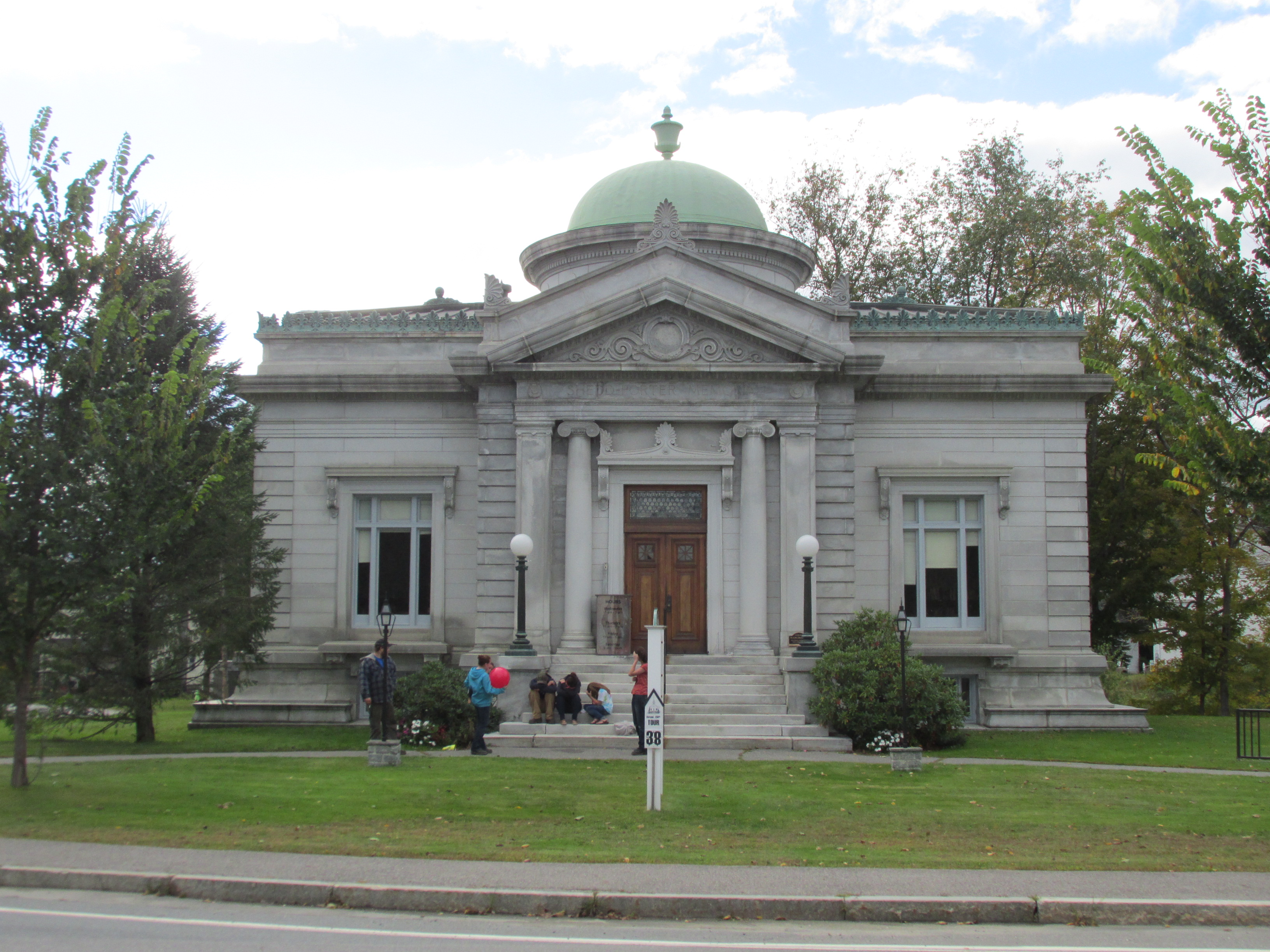
- Shedd-Porter Memorial Library

- Seal
- Motto: Vilas Pool Carillon
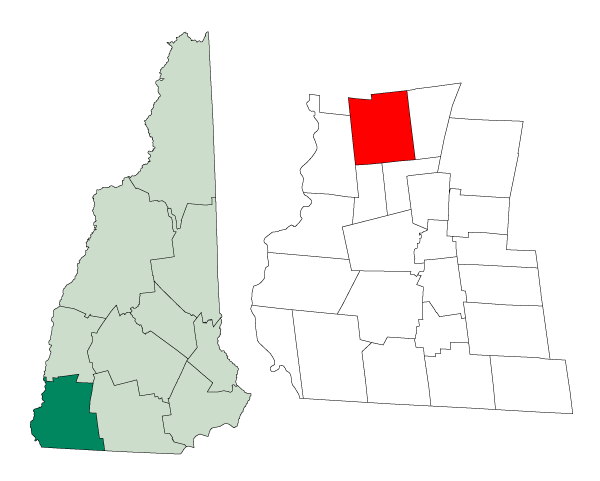
- Location in Cheshire County, New Hampshire
- Coordinates: 43°06′56″N 72°18′38″W
- Country: United States
- State: New Hampshire
- County: Cheshire
- Incorporated: 1763
- Villages: Alstead; Alstead Center; East Alstead; Mill Hollow

Area
  - Total: 39.4 sq mi (102.0 km^{2})
  - Land: 38.8 sq mi (100.6 km^{2})
  - Water: 0.58 sq mi (1.5 km^{2}) 1.44%
- Elevation: 1,467 ft (447 m)

Population (2020)
  - Total: 1,864
  - Density: 48/sq mi (18.5/km^{2})
- Time zone: UTC-5 (Eastern)
  - Summer (DST): UTC-4 (Eastern)
- ZIP code: 03602
- Area code: 603
- FIPS code: 33-00820
- GNIS feature ID: 873529
- Website: www.alsteadnh.org

Alstead (/ˈælstɛd/) is a town in Cheshire County, New Hampshire, United States. The population was 1,864 at the 2020 census, and an estimated 1,928 in 2025. Alstead is home to Feuer State Forest.

== History ==
The town was chartered by Massachusetts Governor Jonathan Belcher in 1735 as one in a line of nine forts intended to protect southwestern New Hampshire from Indian attack. It was granted as "Newton" or "Newtown" in 1752 by Governor Benning Wentworth, but would be incorporated in 1763 as Alstead. It was named for Johann Heinrich Alsted, who compiled an early encyclopedia that was popular at Harvard College. Settled about 1764, Alstead would be one of the towns that wavered in its allegiance after the Revolutionary War. It decided to join Vermont in April 1781, but at the insistence of George Washington, returned to New Hampshire authority early the next year.

Formerly known as "Paper Mill Village", Alstead is the location of one of the state's first paper mills. It was established in 1793 on the Cold River by Ephraim and Elisha Kingsbury. Paper was then a rare and expensive product, made by chopping rags of linen and cotton cloth into pulp. The mill was destroyed by fire in 1880. While Alstead was basically an agricultural community, its streams and ponds once powered a variety of small mills. A turbine water mill at East Alstead is probably the last of its type anywhere in the region.

Shedd-Porter Memorial Library, built in 1909–1910 in the Beaux-Arts style, was a gift to Alstead and Langdon by native son John G. Shedd, president of Marshall Field's department store in Chicago. Another native son philanthropist, Charles M. Vilas, gave a large public recreation area, school building and the only carillon in Cheshire County.

On the weekend of October 8–9, 2005, parts of Alstead were devastated by a severe flood. Heavy rain in Cheshire County—at least 7 inches (180 mm) in a 30-hour period—caused the Cold River and its tributaries to swell. The streamflows, which were swollen by the surge of water from Warren Brook, exceeded a 500-year recurrence interval. The storm created major property damage in Alstead, Langdon, and Walpole along the Cold River and Warren Brook. It washed away homes, cars, and 4 miles (6 km) of Route 123. Four inhabitants of the town were killed. A Save Our History grant from The History Channel provided funding to the Alstead Historical Society and several students of the local high school, who wrote and printed a book called Too Much Water, Too Much Rain, chronicling the disaster and its aftermath.

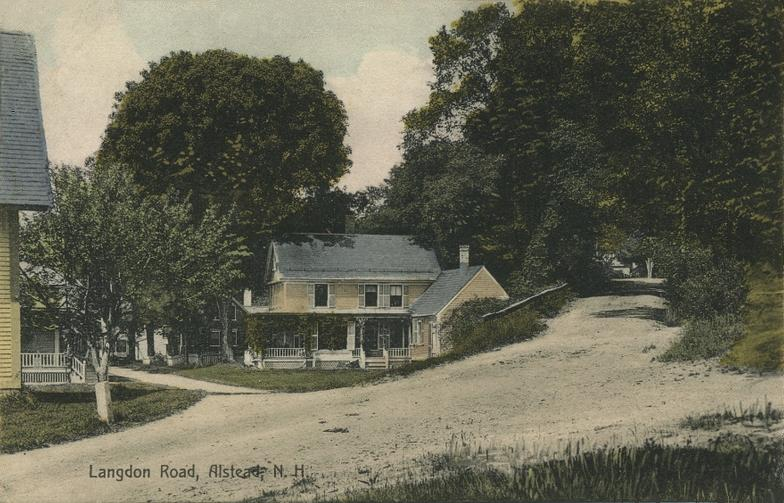
Langdon Road in 1910

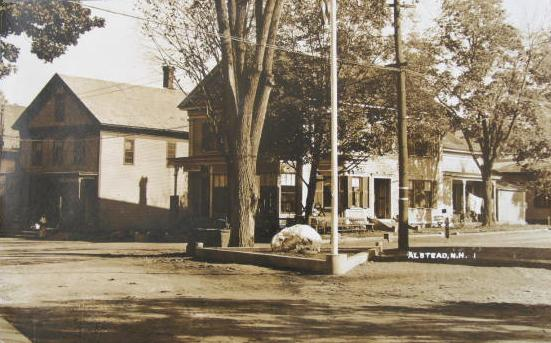
Street scene c. 1912

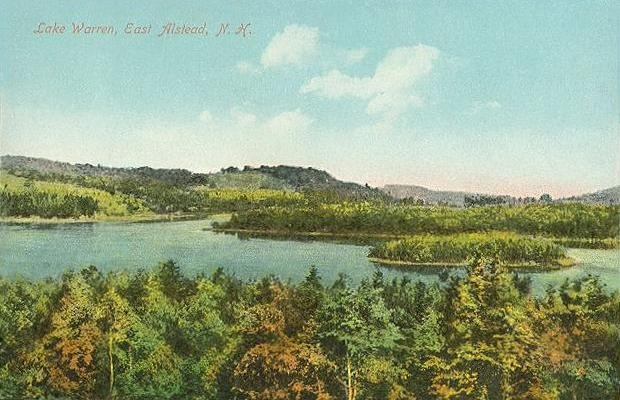
Lake Warren in 1910

== Geography ==
According to the United States Census Bureau, the town has a total area of 39.4 square miles (102.0 km^{2}), of which 38.8 square miles (100.6 km^{2}) are land and 0.6 square miles (1.5 km^{2}) are water, comprising 1.44% of the town. Alstead is drained by the Cold River, and Lake Warren is in the eastern part of the town. The highest point in Alstead is Smith Hill, at 1,795 feet (547 m) above sea level. Alstead lies fully within the Connecticut River watershed.

The town is served by state routes 123, 123A and 12A.

=== Adjacent municipalities ===
- Acworth (north)
- Marlow (east)
- Gilsum (southeast)
- Surry (southwest)
- Walpole (west)
- Langdon (northwest)

== Demographics ==
Historical population
Census	Pop.	Note	%±
1790	1,111		—
1800	1,666		50.0%
1810	1,694		1.7%
1820	1,611		−4.9%
1830	1,552		−3.7%
1840	1,454		−6.3%
1850	1,425		−2.0%
1860	1,318		−7.5%
1870	1,213		−8.0%
1880	1,037		−14.5%
1890	870		−16.1%
1900	799		−8.2%
1910	711		−11.0%
1920	672		−5.5%
1930	616		−8.3%
1940	683		10.9%
1950	851		24.6%
1960	843		−0.9%
1970	1,185		40.6%
1980	1,461		23.3%
1990	1,721		17.8%
2000	1,944		13.0%
2010	1,937		−0.4%
2020	1,864		−3.8%
2024 (est.)	1,925		3.3%
U.S. Decennial Census

As of the census of 2000, there were 1,944 people, 771 households, and 534 families residing in the town. The population density was 50.0 inhabitants per square mile (19.3/km^{2}). There were 941 housing units at an average density of 24.2 per square mile (9.3/km^{2}). The racial makeup of the town was 98.20% White, 0.21% African American, 0.62% Native American, 0.51% Asian, and 0.46% from two or more races. Hispanic or Latino of any race were 0.51% of the population.

There were 771 households, out of which 33.6% had children under the age of 18 living with them, 56.7% were married couples living together, 8.9% had a female householder with no husband present, and 30.7% were non-families. 24.5% of all households were made up of individuals, and 8.0% had someone living alone who was 65 years of age or older. The average household size was 2.51 and the average family size was 2.99.

In the town, the population was spread out, with 26.0% under the age of 18, 6.1% from 18 to 24, 28.5% from 25 to 44, 26.7% from 45 to 64, and 12.7% who were 65 years of age or older. The median age was 40 years. For every 100 females, there were 104.4 males. For every 100 females age 18 and over, there were 98.2 males.

The median income for a household in the town was $43,191, and the median income for a family was $47,311. Males had a median income of $35,481 versus $23,785 for females. The per capita income for the town was $20,444. About 3.5% of families and 7.9% of the population were below the poverty line, including 10.9% of those under age 18 and 4.7% of those age 65 or over.

== Police department ==
The Alstead Police Department is staffed by one full-time officer, a full-time chief, a part-time officer, and a part-time administrative assistant. The town has two police cruisers, a 2017 Police Interceptor SUV and a 2016 Police Interceptor SUV, one of which was donated by an Alstead citizen.

== Sites of interest ==
- Alstead Historical Society Museum
- Shedd Porter Memorial Library
- Vilas Pool and its carillon of bells

== Notable people ==
- Sarah Hall Boardman (1803–1845), missionary
- Titus Brown (1786–1849), US congressman
- John Curtis Chamberlain (1772–1834), US congressman
- Thomas Fletcher (1787–1866), silversmith, retailer
- James Gruber, state legislator
- Salma Hale (1787–1866), printer, US congressman
- Corrina Sephora Mensoff (born 1971), artist
- Marion Nicholl Rawson (1878–1956), author, lecturer, illustrator
- John G. Shedd (1850–1926), former chairman of Marshall Field & Co.
- Samuel Thomson (1769–1843), founder of the Thomsonion System of Medicine
- Allen Wardner (1786–1877), Vermont State Treasurer
- Asa Wentworth Jr. (1797–1882), businessman, politician
