= Ichabod Bartlett =

American politician (1786–1853)

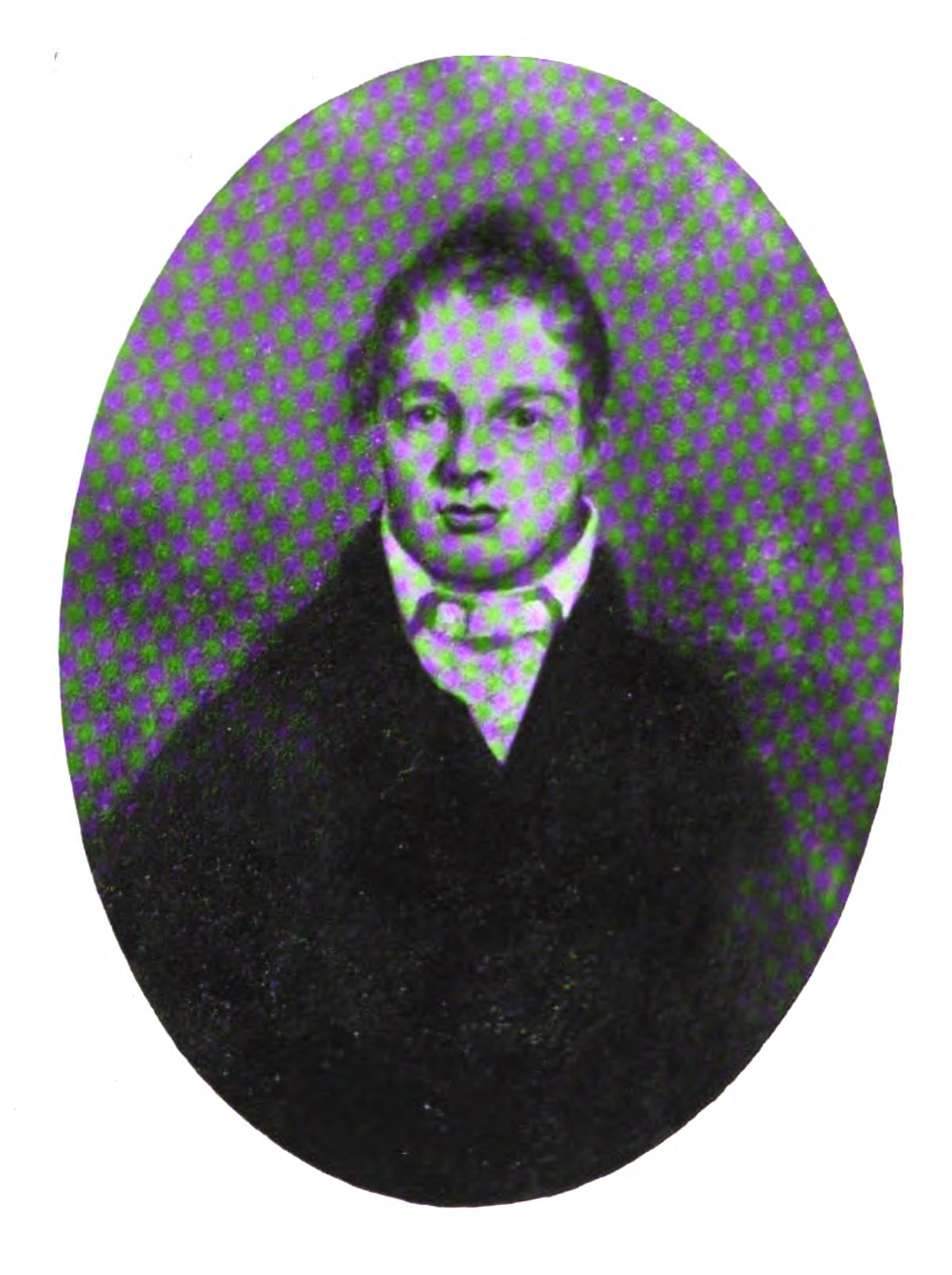

Member of the U.S. House of Representatives from New Hampshire's At-large district
- In office March 4, 1823 – March 3, 1829
- Preceded by: Josiah Butler
- Succeeded by: John Brodhead

Speaker of the New Hampshire House of Representatives 30th New Hampshire General Court
- In office June 6, 1821 – June 30, 1821
- Preceded by: Matthew Harvey
- Succeeded by: Charles Woodman

Personal details
- Born: July 24, 1786 Salisbury; Merrimack County; New Hampshire, USA
- Died: October 19, 1853 (aged 67) Portsmouth; Rockingham County; New Hampshire, USA
- Resting place: Harmony Grove Cemetery; Portsmouth; Rockingham County; New Hampshire
- Party: Adams-Clay Republican; Adams
- Education: Dartmouth College

Ichabod Bartlett (July 24, 1786 – October 19, 1853) was an American politician and a United States representative from New Hampshire.

== Early life ==
Bartlett was born in Salisbury, New Hampshire on July 24, 1786. He received a classical education and graduated from Dartmouth College in Hanover in 1808. He studied law and was admitted to the bar in 1811, commencing practice in Durham.

== Career ==
Bartlett moved to Portsmouth in 1816 and continued the practice of law. He was the clerk of the New Hampshire Senate in 1817 and 1818, and served as the state solicitor for Rockingham County 1819–1821. In addition, he was a member of the New Hampshire House of Representatives 1819-1821 and served as speaker in 1821.

Elected as an Adams-Clay Republican to the Eighteenth Congress and as an Adams to the Nineteenth and Twentieth Congresses, Bartlett served as United States representative from March 4, 1823 to March 3, 1829. He declined the appointment as chief justice of the court of common pleas in 1825, and was again a member of the New Hampshire House of Representatives in 1830, 1838, 1851, and 1852. Failing in a bid for the governorship of New Hampshire in 1832, he served as a member of the state constitutional convention in 1850.

== Death ==
Bartlett was never married. He died in Portsmouth, New Hampshire on October 19, 1853, at age 67. He is interred at Harmony Grove Cemetery, Portsmouth, New Hampshire.

Party political offices
Preceded by Timothy Upham	National Republican nominee for Governor of New Hampshire; 1831, 1832	Succeeded by Arthur Livermore
Political offices
Preceded by Josiah Butler	Member of the United States House of Representatives; New Hampshire's At-Large district 1823-1829	Succeeded by John Brodhead
Preceded by Matthew Harvey	Speaker of the New Hampshire House of Representatives; 30th New Hampshire General Court; 1821-1821	Succeeded by Charles Woodman
