= Samuel Cushman =

American politician

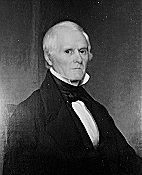

Member of the New Hampshire House of Representatives
- In office 1833–1835

Member of the U.S. House of Representatives from New Hampshire's at-large district
- In office March 4, 1835 – March 4, 1839
- Preceded by: Joseph M. Harper
- Succeeded by: Ira Allen Eastman

Personal details
- Born: June 8, 1783 Portsmouth, New Hampshire, U.S.
- Died: May 20, 1851 (aged 67) Portsmouth, New Hampshire, U.S.
- Resting place: Proprietors’ Burying Ground
- Party: Jacksonian; Democratic
- Spouse: Maria Jane Salter
- Profession: Attorney; Politician

Samuel Cushman (June 8, 1783 – May 20, 1851) was an American attorney and politician in the U.S. state of New Hampshire. He served as a member of the United States House of Representatives and as a member of the New Hampshire House of Representatives in the 1800s.

== Early life and career ==
Cushman was born in Portsmouth, New Hampshire, the son of Job Cushman and Priscilla Ripple Cushman. He attended the common schools, studied law and was admitted to the bar. He began the practice of law in Portsmouth.

He served as judge of the Portsmouth police court and as county treasurer from 1823 to 1828. He was a member of the New Hampshire House of Representatives from 1833 to 1835. Cushman was nominated by President Andrew Jackson to be United States attorney for the District of New Hampshire but was not confirmed.

He was elected as a Jacksonian to the Twenty-fourth Congress and reelected as a Democrat to the Twenty-fifth Congress, serving from March 4, 1835 - March 4, 1839. Cushman served as chairman of the Committee on Commerce during the Twenty-fifth Congress. After leaving Congress, he was a United States Navy officer at Portsmouth from 1845 to 1849.

He died in Portsmouth in 1851 and was interred in the Proprietors’ Burying Ground.

== Personal life ==
Cushman married Elsa Ann Salter in May 1813. They had eleven children. Cushman's mother died in July 1831.

U.S. House of Representatives
Preceded by Joseph M. Harper	Member of the U.S. House of Representatives from New Hampshire's at-large congressional district 1835-1839	Succeeded by Ira A. Eastman
