= Noah Martin (politician) =

American politician (1801–1863)

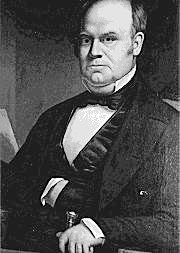

23rd Governor of New Hampshire
- In office June 3, 1852 – June 8, 1854
- Preceded by: Samuel Dinsmoor Jr.
- Succeeded by: Nathaniel B. Baker

Member of the New Hampshire House of Representatives
- In office 1830; 1832; 1837

Member of the New Hampshire Senate
- In office 1835–1836

Personal details
- Born: July 26, 1801 Epsom, New Hampshire, U.S.
- Died: May 28, 1863 (aged 61) Dover, New Hampshire, U.S.
- Party: Democratic
- Spouse: Mary Jane Woodbury
- Profession: Doctor

Noah Martin (July 26, 1801 – May 28, 1863) was a businessman and politician from New Hampshire. He served as the 23rd governor of New Hampshire from 1852 to 1854.

== Biography ==
Noah Anthony Martin was born in Epsom, New Hampshire on July 26, 1801, to shoemaker Samuel Martin and Sally (Cochrane) Martin. He apprenticed under doctors in Pembroke and Deerfield doctors before attending Dartmouth Medical College. He graduated in 1824, and commenced his medical practice in Somersworth. Later, he practiced in Pembroke, and then settled in Dover.

In 1825, Martin married Mary Jane Woodbury, the daughter of Dr. Robert Woodbury of Barrington. They were the parents of two daughters, Elizabeth A. and Caroline M.

Martin served as a State Representative in 1830 and 1832, as a State Senator in 1835 and 1836, and in the House again in 1837.

In addition to his medical practice, Martin was actively engaged in various other pursuits. He was involved in several medical, agricultural, historical, and genealogical societies. Furthermore, he served as the president of the Strafford County Savings Bank (1844 to 1852), a member of the board of directors of the Dover Bank (1847 to 1855), and a member of the board of directors of the Strafford Bank (1860 to 1863).

In 1852 Martin was elected Governor of New Hampshire, the first of two from Dover, and he served two one-year terms, June 3, 1852 to June 8, 1854.

Martin died in Dover on May 28, 1863, and is buried at Dover's Pine Hill Cemetery.

Party political offices
Preceded by Samuel Dinsmoor Jr.	Democratic nominee for Governor of New Hampshire; 1852, 1853	Succeeded by Nathaniel B. Baker
Political offices
Preceded by Samuel Dinsmoor Jr.	Governor of New Hampshire; 1852 – 1854	Succeeded by Nathaniel B. Baker
