= Joseph M. Harper =

American politician

Joseph Morrill Harper
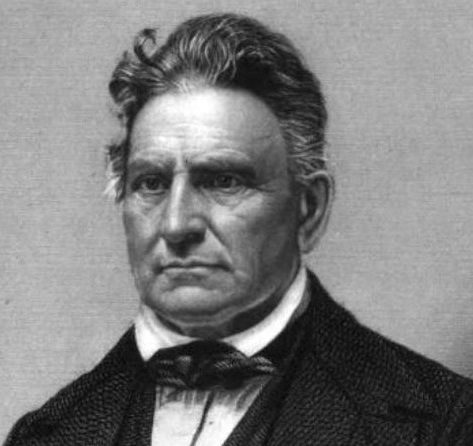

Member of the New Hampshire House of Representatives
- In office 1826–1827

Member of the New Hampshire State Senate
- In office 1829–1830

President of the New Hampshire Senate
- In office 1830–1831
- Preceded by: Samuel Cartland
- Succeeded by: Samuel Cartland

Acting Governor of New Hampshire
- In office February 28, 1831 – June 2, 1831
- Preceded by: Matthew Harvey
- Succeeded by: Samuel Dinsmoor

Member of the United States House of Representatives from New Hampshire's At large district
- In office March 4, 1831 – March 4, 1835
- Preceded by: Jonathan Harvey
- Succeeded by: Samuel Cushman

Personal details
- Born: June 21, 1787 Limerick, Massachusetts, U.S. (now Limerick, Maine)
- Died: January 15, 1865 (aged 77) Canterbury, New Hampshire, U.S.
- Resting place: Village Cemetery
- Party: Jacksonian
- Spouse: Elizabeth Clough
- Profession: Physician; Banker; Politician

Military service
- Branch/service: United States Army, 4th Infantry
- Rank: Assistant Surgeon
- Battles/wars: War of 1812

Joseph Morrill Harper (June 21, 1787 – January 15, 1865) was an American medical doctor, banker and Jacksonian politician in the U.S. state of New Hampshire. He served as a member of the United States House of Representatives, the New Hampshire State Senate and the New Hampshire House of Representatives and was acting governor of New Hampshire.

== Early life and career ==
Harper was born in Limerick (in modern-day Maine, then a part of Massachusetts) and attended Fryeburg Academy. He studied medicine and began the practice of medicine in Sanbornton, New Hampshire, in 1810. In 1811, he moved to Canterbury, New Hampshire, to continue his practice. He served as assistant surgeon in the 4th Infantry in the War of 1812. After the war he returned to his medical practice, and was elected a Fellow of the New Hampshire Medical Society in 1821.

== Political career ==
He was a member of the New Hampshire House of Representatives in 1826 and 1827, and justice of the peace in Canterbury from 1826 to 1865. Harper served in the New Hampshire State Senate in 1829 and 1830, and was president of the State Senate in 1831. He became Acting Governor of New Hampshire in February 1831 when Governor Matthew Harvey resigned as governor in order to accept a position as a United States federal judge. Harper served as Acting Governor from February 1831 – June 1831.

Harper was elected as a Jacksonian candidate to the Twenty Second and Twenty Third Congresses, serving as a U.S. Representative from March 4, 1831 – March 3, 1835.

After leaving Congress, he resumed the practice of medicine. He was justice of the peace from 1835 to 1865 and president of the Mechanics Bank of Concord from 1847 to 1856.

Harper died on January 15, 1865, in Canterbury, and is interred in the Village Cemetery.

== Personal life ==
Harper married Elizabeth Clough on June 6, 1816. They had two sons and a daughter. Their daughter, Sarah Elizabeth Harper (married surname Monmouth), is featured on a New Hampshire historical marker, no. 283, in the town of Canterbury.

Political offices
Preceded by Matthew Harvey	Acting Governor of New Hampshire; February 28, 1831 – June 1831	Succeeded by Samuel Dinsmoor
Preceded by Samuel Cartland	President of the New Hampshire Senate; 1830– 1831	Succeeded by Samuel Cartland
U.S. House of Representatives
Preceded by Jonathan Harvey	Member of the U.S. House of Representatives from New Hampshire's at-large congressional district 1831–1835	Succeeded by Samuel Cushman
