= Samuel Dinsmoor Jr. =

American politician (1799–1869)

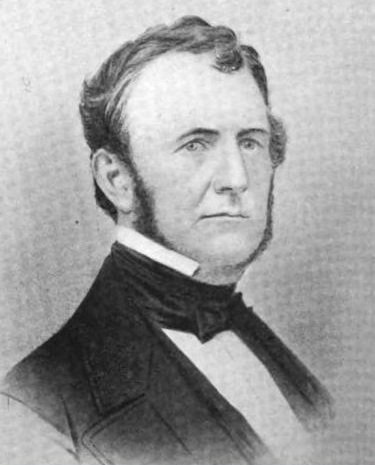

22nd Governor of New Hampshire
- In office June 7, 1849 – June 3, 1852
- Preceded by: Jared W. Williams
- Succeeded by: Noah Martin

Personal details
- Born: May 8, 1799 Keene, New Hampshire, U.S.
- Died: February 24, 1869 (aged 69) Keene, New Hampshire, U.S.
- Party: Democratic
- Spouse(s): Ann Eliza Jarvis; Catherine Abbott Pickman Fox
- Children: 2
- Relatives: Samuel Dinsmoor (father)
- Education: Dartmouth College
- Profession: Attorney, businessman, banker

Samuel Dinsmoor Jr. (May 8, 1799 – February 24, 1869) was an American lawyer, banker, politician, and the 22nd governor of New Hampshire.

== Early life ==
Dinsmoor was born in Keene, New Hampshire and graduated from Dartmouth College in 1814. He studied law and was a legal assistant to Territorial Governor James Miller for several years in Arkansas.

== Career ==
A commissioner who made it possible for the visit of French General Lafayette to New Hampshire in 1825, Dinsmoor also served as clerk of the New Hampshire Senate in 1826, 1827, 1829 and 1830.

Having secured the Democratic gubernatorial nomination, Dinsmoor was elected by a popular vote in 1849, and reelected to a second term in 1850, as well as a third term in 1851. He served as thirtieth Governor of New Hampshire from June 7, 1849, to June 3, 1852. The state militia was restructured during his tenure.

Upon leaving the governorship, Dinsmoor retired from political life, but continued to stay active in his legal and banking interests. From 1835 until his death Dinsmoor was President of the Ashuelot Bank in Keene.

== Death ==
Dinsmoor died in Keene on February 24, 1869 (age 69 years, 292 days). He is interred at Washington Street Cemetery in Keene.

== Family life ==
His father, Samuel Dinsmoor, had been Governor of New Hampshire from 1831 to 1834. On September 11, 1841, Samuel Dinsmoor Jr. married Anne Eliza Jarvis, and they had two children: William Jarvis Dinsmoor and Samuel Dinsmoor III. Anne died on July 17, 1849; and he married Catharine Pickman Abbott Fox on May 4, 1853.

Party political offices
Preceded by Jared W. Williams	Democratic nominee for Governor of New Hampshire; 1849, 1850, 1851	Succeeded by Noah Martin
Political offices
Preceded by Jared W. Williams	Governor of New Hampshire; 1849–1852	Succeeded by Noah Martin
