= List of former United States representatives (H) =

This is a complete list of former United States representatives whose last names begin with the letter H.

== Number of years and terms the member has served ==
The number of years the representative/delegate has served in Congress indicates the number of terms the representative/delegate has. Note the representative/delegate can also serve non-consecutive terms if the representative/delegate loses election and wins re-election to the House.

- 2 years - 1 or 2 terms
- 4 years - 2 or 3 terms
- 6 years - 3 or 4 terms
- 8 years - 4 or 5 terms
- 10 years - 5 or 6 terms
- 12 years - 6 or 7 terms
- 14 years - 7 or 8 terms
- 16 years - 8 or 9 terms
- 18 years - 9 or 10 terms
- 20 years - 10 or 11 terms
- 22 years - 11 or 12 terms
- 24 years - 12 or 13 terms
- 26 years - 13 or 14 terms
- 28 years - 14 or 15 terms
- 30 years - 15 or 16 terms
- 32 years - 16 or 17 terms
- 34 years - 17 or 18 terms
- 36 years - 18 or 19 terms
- 38 years - 19 or 20 terms
- 40 years - 20 or 21 terms
- 42 years - 21 or 22 terms
- 44 years - 22 or 23 terms
- 46 years - 23 or 24 terms
- 48 years - 24 or 25 terms
- 50 years - 25 or 26 terms
- 52 years - 26 or 27 terms
- 54 years - 27 or 28 terms
- 56 years - 28 or 29 terms
- 58 years - 29 or 30 terms

Name	Term	State/ Territory	Party	Lifespan
Deb Haaland	2019–2021	New Mexico	Democratic	1960–present
Richard W. Habersham	1839–1842	Georgia	Whig	1786–1842
Richard N. Hackett	1907–1909	North Carolina	Democratic	1866–1923
Thomas C. Hackett	1849–1851	Georgia	Democratic	c. 1798–1851
Aaron Hackley Jr.	1819–1821	New York	Democratic–Republican	1783–1868
Thomas Hackney	1907–1909	Missouri	Democratic	1861–1946
Lindley H. Hadley	1915–1933	Washington	Republican	1861–1948
William F. L. Hadley	1895–1897	Illinois	Republican	1847–1901
G. Elliott Hagan	1961–1973	Georgia	Democratic	1916–1990
John Hagans	1873–1875	West Virginia	Republican	1838–1900
Jim Hagedorn	2019–2022	Minnesota	Republican	1962–2022
Tom Hagedorn	1975–1983	Minnesota	Republican	1943–present
Harlan Hagen	1953–1967	California	Democratic	1914–1990
Harold Hagen	1943–1945	Minnesota	Farmer-Labor	1901–1957
Harold Hagen	1945–1955	Minnesota	Republican	1901–1957
Alva L. Hager	1893–1899	Iowa	Republican	1850–1923
Warren A. Haggott	1907–1909	Colorado	Republican	1864–1958
Janice Hahn	2011–2016	California	Democratic	1952–present
John Hahn	1815–1817	Pennsylvania	Democratic-Republican	1776–1823
Michael Hahn	1862–1863	Louisiana	Unionist	1830–1886
Michael Hahn	1885–1886	Louisiana	Republican	1830–1886
Charles Haight	1867–1871	New Jersey	Democratic	1838–1891
Edward Haight	1861–1863	New York	Democratic	1817–1885
William Haile	1826–1828	Mississippi	Democratic	1797–1837
John Hailey	1873–1875; 1885–1887	Idaho	Democratic	1835–1921
Eugene J. Hainer	1893–1897	Nebraska	Republican	1851–1929
Charles Delemere Haines	1893–1895	New York	Democratic	1856–1929
Harry L. Haines	1931–1939; 1941–1943	Pennsylvania	Democratic	1880–1947
Richard Jacobs Haldeman	1869–1873	Pennsylvania	Democratic	1831–1886
Artemas Hale	1845–1849	Massachusetts	Whig	1783–1882
Eugene Hale	1869–1879	Maine	Republican	1836–1918
Fletcher Hale	1925–1931	New Hampshire	Republican	1883–1931
James Tracy Hale	1859–1863	Pennsylvania	Republican	1810–1865
James Tracy Hale	1863–1865	Pennsylvania	Independent Republican	1810–1865
John B. Hale	1885–1887	Missouri	Democratic	1831–1905
John P. Hale	1843–1845	New Hampshire	Democratic	1806–1873
Nathan W. Hale	1905–1909	Tennessee	Republican	1860–1941
Robert Hale	1943–1959	Maine	Republican	1889–1976
Robert S. Hale	1865–1867; 1873–1875	New York	Republican	1822–1881
Salma Hale	1817–1819	New Hampshire	Democratic-Republican	1787–1866
William Hale	1809–1811; 1813–1817	New Hampshire	Federalist	1765–1848
Elisha Haley	1835–1839	Connecticut	Democratic	1776–1860
James A. Haley	1953–1977	Florida	Democratic	1899–1981
Albert R. Hall	1925–1931	Indiana	Republican	1884–1969
Augustus Hall	1855–1857	Iowa	Democratic	1814–1861
Benton Jay Hall	1885–1887	Iowa	Democratic	1835–1894
Bolling Hall	1811–1817	Georgia	Democratic-Republican	1767–1836
Chapin Hall	1859–1861	Pennsylvania	Republican	1816–1879
Darwin Hall	1889–1891	Minnesota	Republican	1844–1919
David McKee Hall	1959–1960	North Carolina	Democratic	1918–1960
Durward G. Hall	1961–1973	Missouri	Republican	1910–2001
Edwin Arthur Hall	1939–1953	New York	Republican	1909–2004
George Hall	1819–1821	New York	Democratic–Republican	1770–1840
Hiland Hall	1833–1837	Vermont	National Republican	1795–1885
Hiland Hall	1837–1843	Vermont	Whig	1795–1885
Homer W. Hall	1927–1933	Illinois	Republican	1870–1954
James Knox Polk Hall	1899–1903	Pennsylvania	Democratic	1844–1915
John Hall	2007–2011	New York	Democratic	1948–present
Joseph Hall	1833–1837	Maine	Democratic	1793–1859
Joshua G. Hall	1879–1883	New Hampshire	Republican	1828–1898
Katie Hall	1982–1985	Indiana	Democratic	1938–2012
Kwanza Hall	2020–2021	Georgia	Democratic	1971–present
Lawrence W. Hall	1857–1859	Ohio	Democratic	1819–1863
Leonard W. Hall	1939–1952	New York	Republican	1900–1979
Nathan K. Hall	1847–1849	New York	Whig	1810–1874
Norman Hall	1887–1889	Pennsylvania	Democratic	1829–1917
Obed Hall	1811–1813	New Hampshire	Democratic-Republican	1757–1828
Osee M. Hall	1891–1895	Minnesota	Democratic	1847–1914
Philo Hall	1907–1909	South Dakota	Republican	1865–1938
Ralph Hall	1981–2015	Texas	Republican	1923–2019
Robert Bernard Hall	1855–1857	Massachusetts	American	1812–1868
Robert Bernard Hall	1857–1859	Massachusetts	Republican	1812–1868
Robert S. Hall	1929–1933	Mississippi	Democratic	1879–1941
Sam B. Hall Jr.	1976–1985	Texas	Democratic	1924–1994
Thomas Hall	1924–1933	North Dakota	Republican	1869–1958
Thomas H. Hall	1817–1825	North Carolina	Democratic-Republican	1773–1853
Thomas H. Hall	1827–1835	North Carolina	Democratic	1773–1853
Tim Lee Hall	1975–1977	Illinois	Democratic	1925–2008
Tony P. Hall	1979–2002	Ohio	Democratic	1942–present
Uriel S. Hall	1893–1897	Missouri	Democratic	1852–1932
Willard Hall	1817–1821	Delaware	Democratic-Republican	1780–1875
Willard P. Hall	1847–1853	Missouri	Democratic	1820–1882
William Hall	1831–1833	Tennessee	Democratic	1775–1856
William A. Hall	1862–1863	Missouri	Democratic	1815–1888
William A. Hall	1863–1865	Missouri	Unionist	1815–1888
Charles A. Halleck	1935–1969	Indiana	Republican	1900–1986
John Hallock Jr.	1825–1829	New York	Democratic	1783–1840
Ransom Halloway	1849–1851	New York	Whig	c. 1793–1851
Edwin Hallowell	1891–1893	Pennsylvania	Democratic	1844–1916
Seymour Halpern	1959–1973	New York	Republican	1913–1997
John E. Halsell	1883–1887	Kentucky	Democratic	1826–1899
George A. Halsey	1867–1869; 1871–1873	New Jersey	Republican	1827–1894
Jehiel H. Halsey	1829–1831	New York	Democratic	1788–1867
Nicoll Halsey	1833–1835	New York	Democratic	1782–1865
Silas Halsey	1805–1807	New York	Democratic–Republican	1743–1832
Thomas J. Halsey	1929–1931	Missouri	Republican	1863–1951
William Halstead	1837–1839; 1841–1843	New Jersey	Whig	1794–1878
Frederick Halterman	1895–1897	Pennsylvania	Republican	1831–1907
Debbie Halvorson	2009–2011	Illinois	Democratic	1958–present
Kittel Halvorson	1891–1893	Minnesota	Populist	1846–1936
Samuel Hambleton	1869–1873	Maryland	Democratic	1812–1886
Daniel Hamburg	1993–1995	California	Democratic	1948–present
Thomas L. Hamer	1833–1839	Ohio	Democratic	1800–1846
Thomas R. Hamer	1909–1911	Idaho	Republican	1864–1950
James A. Hamill	1907–1921	New Jersey	Democratic	1877–1941
Patrick Hamill	1869–1871	Maryland	Democratic	1817–1895
Andrew H. Hamilton	1875–1879	Indiana	Democratic	1834–1895
Andrew Jackson Hamilton	1859–1861	Texas	Independent Democrat	1815–1875
Charles Mann Hamilton	1913–1919	New York	Republican	1874–1942
Charles Memorial Hamilton	1868–1871	Florida	Republican	1840–1875
Cornelius S. Hamilton	1867	Ohio	Republican	1821–1867
Daniel W. Hamilton	1907–1909	Iowa	Democratic	1861–1936
Edward L. Hamilton	1897–1921	Michigan	Republican	1857–1923
Finley Hamilton	1933–1935	Kentucky	Democratic	1886–1940
James Hamilton Jr.	1822–1825	South Carolina	Democratic-Republican	1786–1857
James Hamilton Jr.	1825–1829	South Carolina	Democratic	1786–1857
John Hamilton	1805–1807	Pennsylvania	Democratic-Republican	1754–1837
John M. Hamilton	1911–1913	West Virginia	Democratic	1855–1916
John Taylor Hamilton	1891–1893	Iowa	Democratic	1843–1925
Lee Hamilton	1965–1999	Indiana	Democratic	1931–2026
Norman R. Hamilton	1937–1939	Virginia	Democratic	1877–1964
Robert Hamilton	1873–1877	New Jersey	Democratic	1809–1878
William T. Hamilton	1849–1855	Maryland	Democratic	1820–1888
Courtney W. Hamlin	1903–1905; 1907–1919	Missouri	Democratic	1858–1950
Edward S. Hamlin	1844–1845	Ohio	Whig	1808–1894
Hannibal Hamlin	1843–1847	Maine	Democratic	1809–1891
Simon M. Hamlin	1935–1937	Maine	Democratic	1866–1939
William C. Hammer	1921–1930	North Carolina	Democratic	1865–1930
John Paul Hammerschmidt	1967–1993	Arkansas	Republican	1922–2015
William H. Hammett	1843–1845	Mississippi	Democratic	1799–1861
Edward Hammond	1849–1853	Maryland	Democratic	1812–1882
Jabez Delano Hammond	1815–1817	New York	Democratic–Republican	1778–1855
James H. Hammond	1835–1836	South Carolina	Nullifier	1807–1864
John Hammond	1879–1883	New York	Republican	1827–1889
Nathaniel J. Hammond	1879–1887	Georgia	Democratic	1833–1899
Peter Francis Hammond	1936–1937	Ohio	Democratic	1887–1971
Robert H. Hammond	1837–1841	Pennsylvania	Democratic	1791–1847
Samuel Hammond	1803–1805	Georgia	Democratic-Republican	1757–1842
Thomas Hammond	1893–1895	Indiana	Democratic	1843–1909
Winfield Scott Hammond	1907–1915	Minnesota	Democratic	1863–1915
David Hammons	1847–1849	Maine	Democratic	1808–1888
Joseph Hammons	1829–1833	New Hampshire	Democratic	1787–1836
James G. Hampton	1845–1849	New Jersey	Whig	1814–1861
Moses Hampton	1847–1851	Pennsylvania	Whig	1803–1878
Wade Hampton I	1795–1797; 1803–1805	South Carolina	Democratic-Republican	1752–1835
Colleen Hanabusa	2011–2015; 2016–2019	Hawaii	Democratic	1951–2026
Lewis Hanback	1883–1887	Kansas	Republican	1839–1897
Harry A. Hanbury	1901–1903	New York	Republican	1863–1940
Kent Hance	1979–1985	Texas	Democratic	1942–present
Luther Hanchett	1861–1862	Wisconsin	Republican	1825–1862
Clarence E. Hancock	1927–1947	New York	Republican	1885–1948
Franklin Wills Hancock Jr.	1930–1939	North Carolina	Democratic	1894–1969
George Hancock	1793–1795	Virginia	Pro-Administration	1754–1820
George Hancock	1795–1797	Virginia	Federalist	1754–1820
John Hancock	1871–1877; 1883–1885	Texas	Democratic	1824–1893
Mel Hancock	1989–1997	Missouri	Republican	1929–2011
Augustus C. Hand	1839–1841	New York	Democratic	1803–1878
T. Millet Hand	1945–1956	New Jersey	Republican	1902–1956
Karen Handel	2017–2019	Georgia	Republican	1962–present
William Anderson Handley	1871–1873	Alabama	Democratic	1834–1909
L. Irving Handy	1897–1899	Delaware	Democratic	1861–1922
James M. Hanks	1871–1873	Arkansas	Democratic	1833–1909
James M. Hanley	1965–1981	New York	Democratic	1920–2003
Frank Hanly	1895–1897	Indiana	Republican	1863–1920
John Hanna	1877–1879	Indiana	Republican	1827–1882
John A. Hanna	1797–1805	Pennsylvania	Democratic-Republican	1762–1805
L. B. Hanna	1909–1913	North Dakota	Republican	1861–1948
Richard Hanna	2011–2017	New York	Republican	1951–2020
Richard T. Hanna	1963–1974	California	Democratic	1914–2001
Mark W. Hannaford	1975–1979	California	Democratic	1925–1985
Edward A. Hannegan	1833–1837	Indiana	Democratic	1807–1859
Robert P. Hanrahan	1973–1975	Illinois	Republican	1934–2011
Henry C. Hansbrough	1889–1891	North Dakota	Republican	1848–1933
George V. Hansen	1965–1969; 1975–1985	Idaho	Republican	1930–2014
Jim Hansen	1981–2003	Utah	Republican	1932–2018
John R. Hansen	1965–1967	Iowa	Democratic	1901–1974
Julia Butler Hansen	1960–1974	Washington	Democratic	1907–1988
Orval H. Hansen	1969–1975	Idaho	Republican	1926–2017
Alexander C. Hanson	1813–1816	Maryland	Federalist	1786–1819
Hugh A. Haralson	1843–1851	Georgia	Democratic	1805–1854
Jeremiah Haralson	1875–1877	Alabama	Republican	1846–1916
Gideon Hard	1833–1835	New York	Anti-Masonic	1797–1885
Gideon Hard	1835–1837	New York	National Republican	1797–1885
Thomas Hardeman Jr.	1859–1861	Georgia	Oppositionist	1825–1891
Thomas Hardeman Jr.	1883–1885	Georgia	Democratic	1825–1891
Cecil M. Harden	1949–1959	Indiana	Republican	1894–1984
Augustus A. Hardenbergh	1875–1879; 1881–1883	New Jersey	Democratic	1830–1889
Benjamin Hardin	1815–1817; 1819–1823	Kentucky	Democratic-Republican	1784–1852
Benjamin Hardin	1833–1837	Kentucky	National Republican	1784–1852
John J. Hardin	1843–1845	Illinois	Whig	1810–1847
Aaron Harding	1861–1865	Kentucky	Unionist	1805–1875
Aaron Harding	1865–1867	Kentucky	Democratic	1805–1875
Abner C. Harding	1865–1869	Illinois	Republican	1807–1874
J. Eugene Harding	1907–1909	Ohio	Republican	1877–1959
Ralph R. Harding	1961–1965	Idaho	Democratic	1929–2006
Thomas W. Hardwick	1903–1914	Georgia	Democratic	1872–1944
Alexander M. Hardy	1895–1897	Indiana	Republican	1847–1927
Cresent Hardy	2015–2017	Nevada	Republican	1957–present
Guy U. Hardy	1919–1933	Colorado	Republican	1872–1947
John Hardy	1881–1885	New York	Democratic	1835–1913
Porter Hardy Jr.	1947–1969	Virginia	Democratic	1903–1995
Rufus Hardy	1907–1923	Texas	Democratic	1855–1943
Butler B. Hare	1925–1933; 1939–1947	South Carolina	Democratic	1875–1967
Darius D. Hare	1891–1895	Ohio	Democratic	1843–1897
James Butler Hare	1949–1951	South Carolina	Democratic	1918–1966
Phil Hare	2007–2011	Illinois	Democratic	1949–present
Silas Hare	1887–1891	Texas	Democratic	1827–1908
Denver D. Hargis	1959–1961	Kansas	Democratic	1921–1989
Tom Harkin	1975–1985	Iowa	Democratic	1939–present
Aaron Harlan	1853–1859	Ohio	Whig	1802–1868
Andrew J. Harlan	1849–1851; 1853–1855	Indiana	Democratic	1815–1907
Byron B. Harlan	1931–1939	Ohio	Democratic	1886–1949
James Harlan	1835–1837	Kentucky	National Republican	1800–1863
James Harlan	1837–1839	Kentucky	Whig	1800–1863
Richard F. Harless	1943–1949	Arizona	Democratic	1905–1970
Jane Harman	1993–1999; 2001–2011	California	Democratic	1945–present
John H. Harmanson	1845–1850	Louisiana	Democratic	1803–1850
Alfred C. Harmer	1871–1875; 1877–1900	Pennsylvania	Republican	1825–1900
Randall S. Harmon	1959–1961	Indiana	Democratic	1903–1982
Forest Harness	1939–1949	Indiana	Republican	1895–1974
Alexander Harper	1837–1839; 1843–1847; 1851–1853	Ohio	Whig	1786–1860
Francis Jacob Harper	1837–1837	Pennsylvania	Democratic	1800–1837
Gregg Harper	2009–2019	Mississippi	Republican	1956–present
James Harper	1833–1837	Pennsylvania	National Republican	1780–1873
James C. Harper	1871–1873	North Carolina	Democratic	1819–1890
John Adams Harper	1811–1813	New Hampshire	Democratic-Republican	1779–1816
Joseph M. Harper	1831–1835	New Hampshire	Democratic	1787–1865
Robert Goodloe Harper	1795	South Carolina	Pro-Administration	1765–1825
Robert Goodloe Harper	1795–1801	South Carolina	Federalist	1765–1825
John W. Harreld	1919–1921	Oklahoma	Republican	1872–1950
William H. Harries	1891–1893	Minnesota	Democratic	1843–1921
Henry W. Harrington	1863–1865	Indiana	Democratic	1825–1882
Michael J. Harrington	1969–1979	Massachusetts	Democratic	1936–present
Vincent F. Harrington	1937–1942	Iowa	Democratic	1903–1943
Benjamin G. Harris	1863–1867	Maryland	Democratic	1805–1895
Benjamin W. Harris	1873–1883	Massachusetts	Republican	1823–1907
Charles M. Harris	1863–1865	Illinois	Democratic	1821–1896
Christopher Columbus Harris	1914–1915	Alabama	Democratic	1842–1935
Claude Harris Jr.	1987–1993	Alabama	Democratic	1940–1994
George E. Harris	1870–1873	Mississippi	Republican	1827–1911
Henry R. Harris	1873–1879; 1885–1887	Georgia	Democratic	1828–1909
Henry S. Harris	1881–1883	New Jersey	Democratic	1850–1902
Herbert Harris	1975–1981	Virginia	Democratic	1926–2014
Isham G. Harris	1849–1853	Tennessee	Democratic	1818–1897
J. Morrison Harris	1855–1861	Maryland	American	1817–1898
John Harris	1807–1809	New York	Democratic-Republican	1760–1824
John T. Harris	1859–1861	Virginia	Independent Democratic	1823–1899
John T. Harris	1871–1881	Virginia	Democratic	1823–1899
Katherine Harris	2003–2007	Florida	Republican	1957–present
Mark Harris	1822–1823	Maine	Democratic-Republican	1779–1843
Oren Harris	1941–1966	Arkansas	Democratic	1903–1997
Robert Harris	1823–1825	Pennsylvania	Democratic-Republican	1768–1851
Robert Harris	1825–1827	Pennsylvania	Democratic	1768–1851
Robert O. Harris	1911–1913	Massachusetts	Republican	1854–1926
Sampson Willis Harris	1847–1857	Alabama	Democratic	1809–1857
Stephen Ross Harris	1895–1897	Ohio	Republican	1824–1905
Thomas K. Harris	1813–1815	Tennessee	Democratic-Republican	17??–1816
Thomas L. Harris	1849–1851; 1855–1858	Illinois	Democratic	1816–1858
Wiley P. Harris	1853–1855	Mississippi	Democratic	1818–1891
William A. Harris	1893–1895	Kansas	Populist	1841–1909
William Alexander Harris	1841–1843	Virginia	Democratic	1805–1864
Winder R. Harris	1941–1944	Virginia	Democratic	1888–1973
Albert Galliton Harrison	1835–1839	Missouri	Democratic	1800–1839
Burr Harrison	1946–1963	Virginia	Democratic	1904–1973
Carter Harrison III	1875–1879	Illinois	Democratic	1825–1893
Carter Bassett Harrison	1793–1795	Virginia	Anti-Administration	c. 1756–1808
Carter Bassett Harrison	1795–1799	Virginia	Democratic-Republican	c. 1756–1808
Francis Burton Harrison	1903–1905; 1907–1913	New York	Democratic	1873–1957
Frank Harrison	1983–1985	Pennsylvania	Democratic	1940–2009
George P. Harrison Jr.	1894–1897	Alabama	Democratic	1841–1922
Horace Harrison	1873–1875	Tennessee	Republican	1829–1885
John Scott Harrison	1853–1857	Ohio	Whig	1804–1878
Pat Harrison	1911–1919	Mississippi	Democratic	1881–1941
R. D. Harrison	1951–1959	Nebraska	Republican	1897–1977
Richard A. Harrison	1861–1863	Ohio	Unionist	1824–1904
Samuel Smith Harrison	1833–1837	Pennsylvania	Democratic	1780–1853
Thomas W. Harrison	1916–1929	Virginia	Democratic	1856–1935
William Henry Harrison	1799–1800; 1816–1819	Northwest; Ohio	Democratic-Republican	1773–1841
William Henry Harrison III	1951–1955; 1961–1965; 1967–1969	Wyoming	Republican	1896–1990
Bill Harsha	1961–1981	Ohio	Republican	1921–2010
Alphonso Hart	1883–1885	Ohio	Republican	1830–1910
Archibald C. Hart	1912–1913; 1913–1917	New Jersey	Democratic	1873–1935
Edward J. Hart	1935–1955	New Jersey	Democratic	1893–1961
Elizur K. Hart	1877–1879	New York	Democratic	1841–1893
Emanuel B. Hart	1851–1853	New York	Democratic	1809–1897
Joseph J. Hart	1895–1897	Pennsylvania	Democratic	1859–1926
Melissa Hart	2001–2007	Pennsylvania	Republican	1962–present
Michael J. Hart	1931–1935	Michigan	Democratic	1877–1951
Roswell Hart	1865–1867	New York	Republican	1824–1883
Dow W. Harter	1933–1943	Ohio	Democratic	1885–1971
J. Francis Harter	1939–1941	New York	Republican	1897–1947
Michael D. Harter	1891–1895	Ohio	Democratic	1846–1896
Fred A. Hartley Jr.	1929–1949	New Jersey	Republican	1902–1969
Thomas Hartley	1789–1795	Pennsylvania	Pro-Administration	1748–1800
Thomas Hartley	1795–1800	Pennsylvania	Federalist	1748–1800
Charles S. Hartman	1893–1897	Montana	Republican	1861–1929
Charles S. Hartman	1897–1899	Montana	Silver Republican	1861–1929
Jesse L. Hartman	1911–1913	Pennsylvania	Republican	1853–1930
Thomas F. Hartnett	1981–1987	South Carolina	Republican	1941–present
Julian Hartridge	1875–1879	Georgia	Democratic	1829–1879
William Hartzell	1875–1879	Illinois	Democratic	1837–1903
Vicky Hartzler	2011–2023	Missouri	Republican	1960–present
David Archibald Harvey	1890–1893	Oklahoma	Republican	1845–1916
Jonathan Harvey	1825–1831	New Hampshire	Democratic	1780–1859
Matthew Harvey	1821–1825	New Hampshire	Democratic-Republican	1781–1866
R. James Harvey	1961–1974	Michigan	Republican	1922–2019
Ralph Harvey	1947–1959; 1961–1966	Indiana	Republican	1901–1991
Abraham Bruyn Hasbrouck	1825–1827	New York	National Republican	1791–1879
Abraham J. Hasbrouck	1813–1815	New York	Democratic–Republican	1773–1845
Josiah Hasbrouck	1803–1805; 1817–1819	New York	Democratic-Republican	1755–1821
Augustus P. Hascall	1851–1853	New York	Whig	1800–1872
Ira S. Haseltine	1881–1883	Missouri	Greenbacker	1821–1899
Dudley C. Haskell	1877–1883	Kansas	Republican	1842–1883
Hal Haskell	1957–1959	Delaware	Republican	1921–2020
Reuben L. Haskell	1915–1919	New York	Republican	1878–1971
William T. Haskell	1847–1849	Tennessee	Whig	1818–1859
John B. Haskin	1857–1861	New York	Democratic	1821–1895
Kittredge Haskins	1901–1909	Vermont	Republican	1836–1916
Dennis Hastert	1987–2007	Illinois	Republican	1942–2026
Alcee Hastings	1993–2021	Florida	Democratic	1936–2021
Doc Hastings	1995–2015	Washington	Republican	1941–present
George Hastings	1853–1855	New York	Democratic	1807–1866
James F. Hastings	1969–1976	New York	Republican	1926–2014
John Hastings	1839–1843	Ohio	Democratic	1778–1854
Serranus Clinton Hastings	1846–1847	Iowa	Democratic	1814–1893
Seth Hastings	1801–1807	Massachusetts	Federalist	1762–1831
William Soden Hastings	1837–1842	Massachusetts	Whig	1798–1842
William Wirt Hastings	1915–1921; 1923–1935	Oklahoma	Democratic	1866–1938
Herschel H. Hatch	1883–1885	Michigan	Republican	1837–1920
Israel T. Hatch	1857–1859	New York	Democratic	1808–1875
Jethro A. Hatch	1895–1897	Indiana	Republican	1837–1912
William H. Hatch	1879–1895	Missouri	Democratic	1833–1896
Charles Hatcher	1981–1993	Georgia	Democratic	1939–2026
Robert A. Hatcher	1873–1879	Missouri	Democratic	1819–1886
Samuel G. Hathaway	1833–1835	New York	Democratic	1780–1867
William Hathaway	1965–1973	Maine	Democratic	1924–2013
Henry H. Hathorn	1873–1877	New York	Republican	1813–1887
John Hathorn	1789–1791	New York	Anti-Administration	1749–1825
John Hathorn	1795–1797	New York	Democratic-Republican	1749–1825
Robert H. Hatton	1859–1861	Tennessee	Oppositionist	1826–1862
Gilbert N. Haugen	1899–1933	Iowa	Republican	1859–1933
Nils P. Haugen	1887–1895	Wisconsin	Republican	1849–1931
Thomas Haughey	1868–1869	Alabama	Republican	1826–1869
Nathaniel Appleton Haven	1809–1811	New Hampshire	Federalist	1762–1831
Solomon G. Haven	1851–1857	New York	Whig	1810–1861
Franck R. Havenner	1937–1939	California	Progressive	1882–1967
Franck R. Havenner	1939–1941; 1945–1953	California	Democratic	1882–1967
Harrison E. Havens	1871–1875	Missouri	Republican	1837–1916
James S. Havens	1910–1911	New York	Democratic	1859–1927
Jonathan Nicoll Havens	1795–1799	New York	Democratic-Republican	1757–1799
Albert Gallatin Hawes	1831–1837	Kentucky	Democratic	1804–1849
Aylett Hawes	1811–1817	Virginia	Democratic-Republican	1768–1833
Harry B. Hawes	1921–1926	Missouri	Democratic	1869–1947
Richard Hawes	1837–1841	Kentucky	Whig	1797–1877
Robert M. A. Hawk	1879–1882	Illinois	Republican	1839–1882
James Hawkes	1821–1823	New York	Democratic–Republican	1776–1865
Augustus Hawkins	1963–1991	California	Democratic	1907–2007
George Sydney Hawkins	1857–1861	Florida	Democratic	1808–1878
Isaac Roberts Hawkins	1866–1867	Tennessee	Unionist	1818–1880
Isaac Roberts Hawkins	1867–1871	Tennessee	Republican	1818–1880
Joseph Hawkins	1829–1831	New York	National Republican	1781–1832
Joseph H. Hawkins	1814–1815	Kentucky	Democratic-Republican	????–1823
Micajah T. Hawkins	1831–1841	North Carolina	Democratic	1790–1858
Charles Hawks Jr.	1939–1941	Wisconsin	Republican	1899–1960
John B. Hawley	1869–1875	Illinois	Republican	1831–1895
Joseph R. Hawley	1872–1875; 1879–1881	Connecticut	Republican	1826–1905
Robert B. Hawley	1897–1901	Texas	Republican	1849–1921
Willis C. Hawley	1907–1933	Oregon	Republican	1864–1941
John Henry Hobart Haws	1851–1853	New York	Whig	1809–1858
Andrew K. Hay	1849–1851	New Jersey	Whig	1809–1881
James Hay	1897–1916	Virginia	Democratic	1856–1931
John B. Hay	1869–1873	Illinois	Republican	1834–1916
Carl Hayden	1912–1927	Arizona	Democratic	1877–1972
Edward D. Hayden	1885–1889	Massachusetts	Republican	1833–1908
Moses Hayden	1823–1825	New York	Democratic–Republican	1785–1830
Moses Hayden	1825–1827	New York	National Republican	1785–1830
Charles Hayes	1983–1993	Illinois	Democratic	1918–1997
Everis A. Hayes	1905–1919	California	Republican	1855–1942
Jimmy Hayes	1987–1995	Louisiana	Democratic	1946–present
Jimmy Hayes	1995–1997	Louisiana	Republican	1946–present
Philip C. Hayes	1877–1881	Illinois	Republican	1833–1916
Philip H. Hayes	1975–1977	Indiana	Democratic	1940–2023
Robin Hayes	1999–2009	North Carolina	Republican	1945–present
Rutherford B. Hayes	1865–1867	Ohio	Republican	1822–1893
Walter I. Hayes	1887–1895	Iowa	Democratic	1841–1901
Thomas Haymond	1849–1851	Virginia	Whig	1794–1869
William S. Haymond	1875–1877	Indiana	Democratic	1823–1885
Charles E. Haynes	1825–1831; 1835–1839	Georgia	Democratic	1784–1841
Martin A. Haynes	1883–1887	New Hampshire	Republican	1842–1919
William E. Haynes	1889–1893	Ohio	Democratic	1829–1914
Brooks Hays	1943–1959	Arkansas	Democratic	1898–1981
Charles Hays	1869–1877	Alabama	Republican	1834–1879
Edward D. Hays	1919–1923	Missouri	Republican	1872–1941
Edward R. Hays	1890–1891	Iowa	Republican	1847–1896
Samuel Hays	1843–1845	Pennsylvania	Democratic	1783–1868
Samuel Lewis Hays	1841–1843	Virginia	Democratic	1794–1871
Wayne Hays	1949–1976	Ohio	Democratic	1911–1989
William Hayward Jr.	1823–1825	Maryland	Democratic-Republican	1787–1836
Donald Hayworth	1955–1957	Michigan	Democratic	1898–1982
J. D. Hayworth	1995–2007	Arizona	Republican	1958–present
Nan Hayworth	2011–2013	New York	Republican	1959–present
Nathaniel Hazard	1819–1820	Rhode Island	Democratic-Republican	1776–1820
Abner Hazeltine	1833–1835	New York	Anti-Masonic	1793–1879
Abner Hazeltine	1835–1837	New York	National Republican	1793–1879
George Cochrane Hazelton	1877–1883	Wisconsin	Republican	1832–1922
Gerry Whiting Hazelton	1871–1875	Wisconsin	Republican	1829–1920
John W. Hazelton	1871–1875	New Jersey	Republican	1814–1878
James M. Hazlett	1927–1927	Pennsylvania	Republican	1864–1941
William H. Heald	1909–1913	Delaware	Republican	1864–1939
Arthur Daniel Healey	1933–1942	Massachusetts	Democratic	1889–1948
James C. Healey	1956–1965	New York	Democratic	1909–1981
Joseph Healy	1825–1829	New Hampshire	National Republican	1776–1861
Ned R. Healy	1945–1947	California	Democratic	1905–1977
John T. Heard	1885–1895	Missouri	Democratic	1840–1927
William Randolph Hearst	1903–1907	New York	Democratic	1863–1951
James P. Heath	1833–1835	Maryland	Democratic	1777–1854
John Heath	1793–1795	Virginia	Anti-Administration	1758–1810
John Heath	1795–1797	Virginia	Democratic-Republican	1758–1810
David Heaton	1868–1870	North Carolina	Republican	1823–1870
Robert D. Heaton	1915–1919	Pennsylvania	Republican	1873–1933
Joel Heatwole	1895–1903	Minnesota	Republican	1856–1910
William Hebard	1849–1853	Vermont	Whig	1800–1875
F. Edward Hébert	1941–1977	Louisiana	Democratic	1901–1979
Ken Hechler	1959–1977	West Virginia	Democratic	1914–2016
Denny Heck	2013–2021	Washington	Democratic	1952–present
Joe Heck	2011–2017	Nevada	Republican	1961–present
Margaret Heckler	1967–1983	Massachusetts	Republican	1931–2018
Thomas Hedge	1899–1907	Iowa	Republican	1844–1920
E. H. Hedrick	1945–1953	West Virginia	Democratic	1894–1954
James J. Heffernan	1941–1953	New York	Democratic	1888–1967
Joel Hefley	1987–2007	Colorado	Republican	1935–present
J. Thomas Heflin	1904–1920	Alabama	Democratic	1869–1951
Robert Stell Heflin	1869–1871	Alabama	Republican	1815–1901
Bill Hefner	1975–1999	North Carolina	Democratic	1930–2009
Cecil Heftel	1977–1986	Hawaii	Democratic	1924–2010
James V. Heidinger	1941–1945	Illinois	Republican	1882–1945
William Heilman	1879–1883	Indiana	Republican	1824–1890
Fred Heineman	1995–1997	North Carolina	Republican	1929–2010
Daniel B. Heiner	1893–1897	Pennsylvania	Republican	1854–1944
George H. Heinke	1939–1940	Nebraska	Republican	1882–1940
Martin Heinrich	2009–2013	New Mexico	Democratic	1971–present
Victor Heintz	1917–1919	Ohio	Republican	1876–1968
John Heinz	1971–1977	Pennsylvania	Republican	1938–1991
Henry T. Helgesen	1911–1917	North Dakota	Republican	1857–1917
Dean Heller	2007–2011	Nevada	Republican	1960–present
Louis B. Heller	1949–1954	New York	Democratic	1905–1993
Harvey Helm	1907–1919	Kentucky	Democratic	1865–1919
William Helmick	1859–1861	Ohio	Republican	1817–1888
William Helms	1801–1811	New Jersey	Democratic-Republican	????–1813
Henry Helstoski	1965–1977	New Jersey	Democratic	1925–1999
Guy T. Helvering	1913–1919	Kansas	Democratic	1878–1946
James A. Hemenway	1895–1905	Indiana	Republican	1860–1923
John J. Hemphill	1883–1893	South Carolina	Democratic	1849–1912
Joseph Hemphill	1801–1803; 1819–1826	Pennsylvania	Federalist	1770–1842
Joseph Hemphill	1829–1831	Pennsylvania	Democratic	1770–1842
Robert W. Hemphill	1957–1964	South Carolina	Democratic	1915–1983
Edward Hempstead	1812–1814	Missouri	None	1780–1817
George Whitman Hendee	1873–1879	Vermont	Republican	1832–1906
Archibald Henderson	1799–1803	North Carolina	Federalist	1768–1822
Bennett H. Henderson	1815–1817	Tennessee	Democratic-Republican	1784–1850
David B. Henderson	1883–1903	Iowa	Republican	1840–1906
David N. Henderson	1961–1977	North Carolina	Democratic	1921–2004
James Henry Dickey Henderson	1865–1867	Oregon	Republican	1810–1885
John E. Henderson	1955–1961	Ohio	Republican	1917–1994
John S. Henderson	1885–1895	North Carolina	Democratic	1846–1916
Joseph Henderson	1833–1837	Pennsylvania	Democratic	1791–1863
Samuel Henderson	1814–1815	Pennsylvania	Federalist	1764–1841
Thomas Henderson	1795–1797	New Jersey	Federalist	1743–1824
Thomas J. Henderson	1875–1895	Illinois	Republican	1824–1911
Bill Hendon	1981–1983; 1985–1987	North Carolina	Republican	1944–2018
John K. Hendrick	1895–1897	Kentucky	Democratic	1849–1921
Joe Hendricks	1937–1949	Florida	Democratic	1903–1974
Thomas A. Hendricks	1851–1855	Indiana	Democratic	1819–1885
William Hendricks	1816–1822	Indiana	Democratic-Republican	1782–1850
Joseph C. Hendrix	1893–1895	New York	Democratic	1853–1904
Eli Jones Henkle	1875–1881	Maryland	Democratic	1828–1893
Barclay Henley	1883–1887	California	Democratic	1843–1914
Thomas J. Henley	1843–1849	Indiana	Democratic	1808–1875
Bernhart Henn	1851–1855	Iowa	Democratic	1817–1865
Charles W. Henney	1933–1935	Wisconsin	Democratic	1884–1969
Thomas C. Hennings Jr.	1935–1940	Missouri	Democratic	1903–1960
Charles L. Henry	1895–1899	Indiana	Republican	1849–1927
Daniel Maynadier Henry	1877–1881	Maryland	Democratic	1823–1899
E. Stevens Henry	1895–1913	Connecticut	Republican	1836–1921
John Henry	1847	Illinois	Whig	1800–1882
John Flournoy Henry	1826–1827	Kentucky	National Republican	1793–1873
Lewis Henry	1922–1923	New York	Republican	1885–1941
Pat Henry	1901–1903	Mississippi	Democratic	1861–1933
Patrick Henry	1897–1901	Mississippi	Democratic	1843–1930
Paul B. Henry	1985–1993	Michigan	Republican	1942–1993
Robert Kirkland Henry	1945–1946	Wisconsin	Republican	1890–1946
Robert L. Henry	1897–1917	Texas	Democratic	1864–1931
Robert Pryor Henry	1823–1825	Kentucky	Democratic-Republican	1788–1826
Robert Pryor Henry	1825–1826	Kentucky	Democratic	1788–1826
Thomas Henry	1837–1843	Pennsylvania	Anti-Masonic	1779–1849
William Henry	1847–1851	Vermont	Whig	1788–1861
Winder Laird Henry	1894–1895	Maryland	Democratic	1864–1940
Jeb Hensarling	2003–2019	Texas	Republican	1957–present
Walter Lewis Hensley	1911–1919	Missouri	Democratic	1871–1946
William P. Hepburn	1881–1887; 1893–1909	Iowa	Republican	1833–1916
Hilary A. Herbert	1877–1893	Alabama	Democratic	1834–1919
John C. Herbert	1815–1819	Maryland	Federalist	1775–1846
Philemon T. Herbert	1855–1857	California	Democratic	1825–1864
Frank Hereford	1871–1877	West Virginia	Democratic	1825–1891
Wally Herger	1987–2013	California	Republican	1945–present
John Herkimer	1817–1819; 1823–1825	New York	Democratic–Republican	1773–1848
Syd Herlong	1949–1969	Florida	Democratic	1909–1995
Binger Hermann	1885–1897; 1903–1907	Oregon	Republican	1843–1926
Benigno C. Hernández	1915–1917; 1919–1921	New Mexico	Republican	1862–1954
Joseph Marion Hernández	1822–1823	Florida	None	1788–1857
Thomas H. Herndon	1879–1883	Alabama	Democratic	1828–1883
William S. Herndon	1871–1875	Texas	Democratic	1835–1903
William Herod	1837–1839	Indiana	Whig	1801–1871
Yvette Herrell	2021–2023	New Mexico	Republican	1964–present
Jaime Herrera Beutler	2011–2023	Washington	Republican	1978–present
Anson Herrick	1863–1865	New York	Democratic	1812–1868
Ebenezer Herrick	1821–1825	Maine	Democratic-Republican	1785–1839
Ebenezer Herrick	1825–1827	Maine	National Republican	1785–1839
Joshua Herrick	1843–1845	Maine	Democratic	1793–1874
Manuel Herrick	1921–1923	Oklahoma	Republican	1876–1952
Richard P. Herrick	1845–1846	New York	Whig	1791–1846
Samuel Herrick	1817–1821	Ohio	Democratic-Republican	1779–1852
Stephanie Herseth Sandlin	2004–2011	South Dakota	Democratic	1970–present
Ira G. Hersey	1917–1929	Maine	Republican	1858–1943
Samuel F. Hersey	1873–1875	Maine	Republican	1812–1875
Hugh S. Hersman	1919–1921	California	Democratic	1872–1954
Dennis Hertel	1981–1993	Michigan	Democratic	1948–present
Christian Herter	1943–1953	Massachusetts	Republican	1895–1966
John W. Heselton	1945–1959	Massachusetts	Republican	1900–1962
William E. Hess	1929–1937; 1939–1949; 1951–1961	Ohio	Republican	1898–1986
Abram Hewitt	1875–1879; 1881–1886	New York	Democratic	1822–1903
Goldsmith W. Hewitt	1875–1879; 1881–1885	Alabama	Democratic	1834–1895
Ellery Albee Hibbard	1871–1873	New Hampshire	Democratic	1826–1903
Harry Hibbard	1849–1855	New Hampshire	Democratic	1816–1872
Jacob Hibshman	1819–1821	Pennsylvania	Democratic-Republican	1772–1852
Jody Hice	2015–2023	Georgia	Republican	1960–present
Andrew J. Hickey	1919–1931	Indiana	Republican	1872–1942
John Hickman	1855–1859	Pennsylvania	Democratic	1810–1875
John Hickman	1859–1861	Pennsylvania	Anti-Lecompton Democrat	1810–1875
John Hickman	1861–1863	Pennsylvania	Republican	1810–1875
Floyd Hicks	1965–1977	Washington	Democratic	1915–1992
Frederick C. Hicks	1915–1923	New York	Republican	1872–1925
Josiah D. Hicks	1893–1899	Pennsylvania	Republican	1844–1923
Louise Day Hicks	1971–1973	Massachusetts	Democratic	1916–2003
Edgar W. Hiestand	1953–1963	California	Republican	1888–1970
John A. Hiestand	1885–1889	Pennsylvania	Republican	1824–1890
Daniel Hiester	1789–1795	Pennsylvania	Anti-Administration	1747–1804
Daniel Hiester	1795–1796	Pennsylvania	Democratic-Republican	1747–1804
Daniel Hiester	1801–1804	Maryland	Democratic-Republican	1747–1804
Daniel Hiester	1809–1811	Pennsylvania	Democratic-Republican	1774–1834
Isaac Ellmaker Hiester	1853–1855	Pennsylvania	Whig	1824–1871
John Hiester	1807–1809	Pennsylvania	Democratic-Republican	1745–1821
Joseph Hiester	1797–1805	Pennsylvania	Democratic-Republican	1752–1832
William Hiester	1831–1837	Pennsylvania	Anti-Masonic	1790–1853
William Higby	1863–1869	California	Republican	1813–1887
Brian Higgins	2005–2024	New York	Democratic	1959–present
Edwin W. Higgins	1905–1913	Connecticut	Republican	1874–1954
John P. Higgins	1935–1937	Massachusetts	Democratic	1893–1955
William L. Higgins	1933–1937	Connecticut	Republican	1867–1951
Jack Hightower	1975–1985	Texas	Democratic	1926–2013
Samuel G. Hilborn	1892–1894; 1895–1899	California	Republican	1834–1899
Fred H. Hildebrandt	1933–1939	South Dakota	Democratic	1874–1956
Charles Q. Hildebrant	1901–1905	Ohio	Republican	1864–1953
John P. Hiler	1981–1991	Indiana	Republican	1953–present
Baron Hill	1999–2005; 2007–2011	Indiana	Democratic	1953–present
Benjamin Harvey Hill	1875–1877	Georgia	Democratic	1823–1882
Charles A. Hill	1889–1891	Illinois	Republican	1833–1902
Clement S. Hill	1853–1855	Kentucky	Whig	1813–1892
Ebenezer J. Hill	1895–1913; 1915–1917	Connecticut	Republican	1845–1917
Hugh Lawson White Hill	1847–1849	Tennessee	Democratic	1810–1892
J. Lister Hill	1923–1938	Alabama	Democratic	1894–1984
John Hill	1839–1841	North Carolina	Democratic	1797–1861
John Hill	1839–1841	Virginia	Whig	1800–1880
John Hill	1867–1873; 1881–1883	New Jersey	Republican	1821–1884
John Philip Hill	1921–1927	Maryland	Republican	1879–1941
Joshua Hill	1857–1861	Georgia	American	1812–1891
Katie Hill	2019	California	Democratic	1987–present
Knute Hill	1933–1943	Washington	Democratic	1876–1963
Mark Langdon Hill	1819–1821	Massachusetts	Democratic-Republican	1772–1842
Mark Langdon Hill	1821–1823	Massachusetts	Maine	1772–1842
Ralph Hill	1865–1867	Indiana	Republican	1827–1899
Rick Hill	1997–2001	Montana	Republican	1946–present
Robert P. Hill	1913–1915	Illinois	Democratic	1874–1937
Robert P. Hill	1937	Illinois	Oklahoma	1874–1937
Samuel B. Hill	1923–1936	Washington	Democratic	1875–1958
William D. Hill	1879–1881; 1883–1887	Ohio	Democratic	1833–1906
William Henry Hill	1799–1803	North Carolina	Federalist	1767–1809
William Henry Hill	1919–1921	New York	Republican	1876–1972
William S. Hill	1941–1959	Colorado	Republican	1886–1972
Wilson S. Hill	1903–1909	Mississippi	Democratic	1863–1921
Van Hilleary	1995–2003	Tennessee	Republican	1959–present
Jeffrey P. Hillelson	1953–1955	Missouri	Republican	1919–2003
Solomon Hillen Jr.	1839–1841	Maryland	Democratic	1810–1873
James Hillhouse	1791–1795	Connecticut	Pro-Administration	1754–1832
James Hillhouse	1795–1796	Connecticut	Federalist	1754–1832
Benjamin Hilliard	1915–1919	Colorado	Democratic	1868–1951
Earl Hilliard Sr.	1993–2003	Alabama	Democratic	1942–present
Henry W. Hilliard	1845–1851	Alabama	Whig	1808–1892
Patrick J. Hillings	1951–1959	California	Republican	1923–1994
Elwood Hillis	1971–1987	Indiana	Republican	1926–2023
Junius Hillyer	1851–1853	Georgia	Unionist	1807–1886
Junius Hillyer	1853–1855	Georgia	Democratic	1807–1886
Joseph H. Himes	1921–1923	Ohio	Republican	1885–1960
Maurice Hinchey	1993–2013	New York	Democratic	1938–2017
Thomas C. Hindman	1859–1861	Arkansas	Democratic	1828–1868
William Hindman	1793–1795	Maryland	Pro-Administration	1743–1822
William Hindman	1795–1799	Maryland	Federalist	1743–1822
Asher Hinds	1911–1917	Maine	Republican	1863–1919
James M. Hinds	1868	Arkansas	Republican	1833–1868
Thomas Hinds	1828–1831	Mississippi	Democratic	1780–1840
William H. Hinebaugh	1913–1915	Illinois	Progressive	1867–1943
Richard Hines	1825–1827	North Carolina	Democratic	????–1851
William Henry Hines	1893–1895	Pennsylvania	Democratic	1856–1914
Rubén Hinojosa	1997–2017	Texas	Democratic	1940–present
William H. Hinrichsen	1897–1899	Illinois	Democratic	1850–1907
Andrew J. Hinshaw	1973–1977	California	Republican	1923–2016
Carl Hinshaw	1939–1956	California	Republican	1894–1956
Edmund H. Hinshaw	1903–1911	Nebraska	Republican	1860–1932
Jon Hinson	1979–1981	Mississippi	Republican	1942–1995
George Hires	1885–1889	New Jersey	Republican	1835–1911
Mazie Hirono	2007–2013	Hawaii	Democratic	1947–present
Frank Hiscock	1877–1887	New York	Republican	1834–1914
Elijah Hise	1866–1867	Kentucky	Democratic	1802–1867
Gilbert Hitchcock	1903–1905; 1907–1911	Nebraska	Democratic	1859–1934
Peter Hitchcock	1817–1819	Ohio	Democratic-Republican	1781–1853
Phineas Hitchcock	1865–1867	Nebraska	Republican	1831–1881
Robert R. Hitt	1882–1906	Illinois	Republican	1834–1906
Truman H. Hoag	1869–1870	Ohio	Democratic	1816–1870
Moses Hoagland	1849–1851	Ohio	Democratic	1812–1865
Peter Hoagland	1989–1995	Nebraska	Democratic	1941–2007
Ebenezer R. Hoar	1873–1875	Massachusetts	Republican	1816–1895
George F. Hoar	1869–1877	Massachusetts	Republican	1826–1904
Rockwood Hoar	1905–1906	Massachusetts	Republican	1855–1906
Samuel Hoar	1835–1837	Massachusetts	National Republican	1778–1856
Sherman Hoar	1891–1893	Massachusetts	Democratic	1860–1898
Charles B. Hoard	1857–1861	New York	Republican	1805–1886
Aaron Hobart	1820–1825	Massachusetts	Democratic-Republican	1787–1858
Aaron Hobart	1825–1827	Massachusetts	National Republican	1787–1858
Selah R. Hobbie	1827–1829	New York	Democratic	1797–1854
Sam Hobbs	1935–1951	Alabama	Democratic	1887–1952
Fetter Schrier Hoblitzell	1881–1885	Maryland	Democratic	1838–1900
Dave Hobson	1991–2009	Ohio	Republican	1936–2024
Richmond P. Hobson	1907–1915	Alabama	Democratic	1870–1937
Daniel K. Hoch	1943–1947	Pennsylvania	Democratic	1866–1960
Homer Hoch	1919–1933	Kansas	Republican	1879–1949
George J. Hochbrueckner	1987–1995	New York	Democratic	1938–present
Kathy Hochul	2011–2013	New York	Democratic	1958–present
Paul Hodes	2007–2011	New Hampshire	Democratic	1951–present
Asa Hodges	1873–1875	Arkansas	Republican	1822–1900
Charles D. Hodges	1859	Illinois	Democratic	1810–1884
George T. Hodges	1856–1857	Vermont	Republican	1789–1860
James L. Hodges	1827–1833	Massachusetts	National Republican	1790–1846
Joe Hoeffel	1999–2005	Pennsylvania	Democratic	1950–present
Pete Hoekstra	1993–2011	Michigan	Republican	1953–present
John H. Hoeppel	1933–1937	California	Democratic	1881–1976
Charles B. Hoeven	1943–1965	Iowa	Republican	1895–1980
Clyde R. Hoey	1919–1921	North Carolina	Democratic	1877–1954
John H. Hoffecker	1899–1900	Delaware	Republican	1827–1900
Walter O. Hoffecker	1900–1901	Delaware	Republican	1854–1934
Carl Henry Hoffman	1946–1947	Pennsylvania	Republican	1896–1980
Clare Hoffman	1935–1963	Michigan	Republican	1875–1967
Elmer J. Hoffman	1959–1965	Illinois	Republican	1899–1976
Harold G. Hoffman	1927–1931	New Jersey	Republican	1896–1954
Henry William Hoffman	1855–1857	Maryland	American	1825–1895
Michael Hoffman	1825–1833	New York	Democratic	1787–1848
Ogden Hoffman	1837–1841	New York	Whig	1794–1856
Richard W. Hoffman	1949–1957	Illinois	Republican	1893–1975
Earl Hogan	1959–1961	Indiana	Democratic	1920–2007
John Hogan	1865–1867	Missouri	Democratic	1805–1892
Lawrence Hogan	1969–1975	Maryland	Republican	1928–2017
Michael J. Hogan	1921–1923	New York	Republican	1871–1940
William Hogan	1831–1833	New York	Democratic	1792–1874
John Hoge	1804–1805	Pennsylvania	Democratic-Republican	1760–1824
John B. Hoge	1881–1883	West Virginia	Democratic	1825–1896
Joseph P. Hoge	1843–1847	Illinois	Democratic	1810–1891
Solomon L. Hoge	1869–1871; 1875–1877	South Carolina	Republican	1836–1909
William Hoge	1801–1804; 1807–1809	Pennsylvania	Democratic-Republican	1762–1814
James L. Hogeboom	1823–1825	New York	Democratic–Republican	1766–1839
Charles E. Hogg	1887–1889	West Virginia	Democratic	1852–1935
David Hogg	1925–1933	Indiana	Republican	1886–1973
Herschel M. Hogg	1903–1907	Colorado	Republican	1853–1934
Robert L. Hogg	1930–1933	West Virginia	Republican	1893–1973
Samuel E. Hogg	1817–1819	Tennessee	Democratic-Republican	1783–1842
Einar Hoidale	1933–1935	Minnesota	Democratic	1870–1952
Martin Hoke	1993–1997	Ohio	Republican	1952–present
William P. Holaday	1923–1933	Illinois	Republican	1882–1946
Greg J. Holbrock	1941–1943	Ohio	Democratic	1906–1992
Edward D. Holbrook	1865–1869	Idaho	Democratic	1836–1870
George Holcombe	1821–1825	New Jersey	Democratic-Republican	1786–1828
George Holcombe	1825–1828	New Jersey	Democratic	1786–1828
Tim Holden	1993–2013	Pennsylvania	Democratic	1957–2026
George Holding	2013–2021	North Carolina	Republican	1968–present
Chet Holifield	1943–1974	California	Democratic	1903–1995
Alexander Holladay	1849–1853	Virginia	Democratic	1811–1877
Cornelius Holland	1830–1833	Maine	Democratic	1783–1870
Edward E. Holland	1911–1921	Virginia	Democratic	1861–1941
Elmer J. Holland	1942–1943; 1956–1968	Pennsylvania	Democratic	1894–1968
James Holland	1795–1797; 1801–1811	North Carolina	Democratic-Republican	1754–1823
Kenneth Lamar Holland	1975–1983	South Carolina	Democratic	1934–2021
Joel Holleman	1839–1840	Virginia	Democratic	1799–1844
Harold C. Hollenbeck	1977–1983	New Jersey	Republican	1938–present
John M. Holley	1847–1848	New York	Whig	1802–1848
Elias S. Holliday	1901–1909	Indiana	Republican	1842–1936
David Hollingsworth	1909–1911; 1915–1919	Ohio	Republican	1844–1929
Trey Hollingsworth	2017–2023	Indiana	Republican	1983–present
John B. Hollister	1931–1937	Ohio	Republican	1890–1979
Clyde C. Holloway	1987–1993	Louisiana	Republican	1943–2016
David P. Holloway	1855–1857	Indiana	Oppositionist	1809–1883
William S. Holman	1859–1865; 1867–1877; 1881–1895; 1897	Indiana	Democratic	1822–1897
Adoniram J. Holmes	1883–1889	Iowa	Republican	1842–1902
Charles H. Holmes	1870–1871	New York	Republican	1827–1874
David Holmes	1797–1809	Virginia	Democratic-Republican	1769–1832
Elias B. Holmes	1845–1849	New York	Whig	1807–1866
Gabriel Holmes	1825–1829	North Carolina	Democratic	1769–1829
Hal Holmes	1943–1959	Washington	Republican	1902–1977
Isaac E. Holmes	1839–1851	South Carolina	Democratic	1796–1867
John Holmes	1817–1820	Massachusetts	Democratic-Republican	1773–1843
Pehr G. Holmes	1931–1947	Massachusetts	Republican	1881–1952
Sidney T. Holmes	1865–1867	New York	Republican	1815–1890
Uriel Holmes	1817–1818	Connecticut	Federalist	1764–1827
Hopkins Holsey	1835–1839	Georgia	Democratic	1779–1859
Hines Holt	1841	Georgia	Whig	1805–1865
Joseph F. Holt	1953–1961	California	Republican	1924–1997
Marjorie Holt	1973–1987	Maryland	Republican	1920–2018
Orrin Holt	1836–1839	Connecticut	Democratic	1792–1855
Rush Holt Jr.	1999–2015	New Jersey	Democratic	1948–present
Samuel Holten	1793–1795	Massachusetts	Anti-Administration	1738–1816
Hart Benton Holton	1883–1885	Maryland	Republican	1835–1907
Elizabeth Holtzman	1973–1981	New York	Democratic	1941–present
Lester Holtzman	1953–1961	New York	Democratic	1913–2002
Mike Honda	2001–2017	California	Democratic	1941–present
Nan Wood Honeyman	1937–1939	Oregon	Democratic	1881–1970
George E. Hood	1915–1919	North Carolina	Democratic	1875–1960
Enos Hook	1839–1841	Pennsylvania	Democratic	1804–1841
Frank Eugene Hook	1935–1943; 1945–1947	Michigan	Democratic	1893–1982
Charles E. Hooker	1875–1883; 1887–1895; 1901–1903	Mississippi	Democratic	1825–1914
J. Murray Hooker	1921–1925	Virginia	Democratic	1873–1940
Warren B. Hooker	1891–1898	New York	Republican	1856–1920
Charles Hooks	1816–1817; 1819–1825	North Carolina	Democratic-Republican	1768–1843
Darlene Hooley	1997–2009	Oregon	Democratic	1939–present
Benjamin S. Hooper	1883–1885	Virginia	Readjuster	1835–1898
Joseph L. Hooper	1925–1934	Michigan	Republican	1877–1934
Samuel Hooper	1861–1875	Massachusetts	Republican	1808–1875
William Henry Hooper	1859–1861; 1865–1873	Utah	Democratic	1813–1882
Clifford R. Hope	1927–1957	Kansas	Republican	1893–1970
Albert C. Hopkins	1891–1895	Pennsylvania	Republican	1837–1911
Albert J. Hopkins	1885–1903	Illinois	Republican	1846–1922
Benjamin F. Hopkins	1867–1870	Wisconsin	Republican	1829–1870
David W. Hopkins	1929–1933	Missouri	Republican	1897–1968
Francis A. Hopkins	1903–1907	Kentucky	Democratic	1853–1918
George Washington Hopkins	1835–1839	Virginia	Democratic	1804–1861
George Washington Hopkins	1839–1841	Virginia	Conservative	1804–1861
George Washington Hopkins	1841–1847; 1857–1859	Virginia	Democratic	1804–1861
James Herron Hopkins	1875–1877; 1883–1885	Pennsylvania	Democratic	1832–1904
Larry J. Hopkins	1979–1993	Kentucky	Republican	1933–2021
Nathan T. Hopkins	1897	Kentucky	Republican	1852–1927
Samuel Hopkins	1813–1815	Kentucky	Democratic-Republican	1753–1819
Samuel I. Hopkins	1887–1889	Virginia	Labor	1843–1914
Samuel M. Hopkins	1813–1815	New York	Federalist	1772–1837
Stephen T. Hopkins	1887–1889	New York	Republican	1849–1892
Joseph Hopkinson	1815–1819	Pennsylvania	Federalist	1770–1842
Robert F. Hopwood	1915–1917	Pennsylvania	Republican	1856–1940
Walt Horan	1943–1965	Washington	Republican	1898–1966
Henry Horn	1831–1833	Pennsylvania	Democratic	1786–1862
Joan Kelly Horn	1991–1993	Missouri	Democratic	1936–present
Kendra Horn	2019–2021	Oklahoma	Democratic	1976–present
Steve Horn	1993–2003	California	Republican	1931–2011
John Westbrook Hornbeck	1847–1848	Pennsylvania	Whig	1804–1848
Lynn Hornor	1931–1933	West Virginia	Democratic	1874–1933
Ralph Horr	1931–1933	Washington	Republican	1884–1960
Roswell G. Horr	1879–1885	Michigan	Republican	1830–1896
Jerediah Horsford	1851–1853	New York	Whig	1791–1875
Frank Horton	1963–1993	New York	Republican	1919–2004
Frank O. Horton	1939–1941	Wyoming	Republican	1882–1948
Thomas R. Horton	1855–1857	New York	Oppositionist	1823–1894
Valentine B. Horton	1855–1859; 1861–1863	Ohio	Republican	1802–1888
George Gilbert Hoskins	1873–1877	New York	Republican	1824–1893
Craig Hosmer	1953–1974	California	Republican	1915–1982
Hezekiah L. Hosmer	1797–1799	New York	Federalist	1765–1814
Abraham J. Hostetler	1879–1881	Indiana	Democratic	1818–1899
Jacob Hostetter	1818–1821	Pennsylvania	Democratic-Republican	1754–1831
John Hostettler	1995–2007	Indiana	Republican	1961–present
Giles W. Hotchkiss	1863–1867; 1869–1871	New York	Republican	1815–1878
Julius Hotchkiss	1867–1869	Connecticut	Democratic	1810–1878
Jacob Houck Jr.	1841–1843	New York	Democratic	1801–1857
David Hough	1803–1807	New Hampshire	Federalist	1753–1831
William J. Hough	1845–1847	New York	Democratic	1795–1869
Alanson B. Houghton	1919–1922	New York	Republican	1863–1941
Amo Houghton	1987–2005	New York	Republican	1926–2020
Sherman Otis Houghton	1871–1875	California	Republican	1828–1914
George W. Houk	1891–1894	Ohio	Democratic	1825–1894
John C. Houk	1891–1895	Tennessee	Republican	1860–1923
Leonidas C. Houk	1879–1891	Tennessee	Republican	1836–1891
John F. House	1875–1883	Tennessee	Democratic	1827–1904
Julius Houseman	1883–1885	Michigan	Democratic	1832–1891
George S. Houston	1841–1849; 1851–1861	Alabama	Democratic	1811–1879
Henry A. Houston	1903–1905	Delaware	Democratic	1847–1925
John M. Houston	1935–1943	Kansas	Democratic	1890–1975
John W. Houston	1845–1851	Delaware	Whig	1814–1896
Robert G. Houston	1925–1933	Delaware	Republican	1867–1946
Sam Houston	1823–1825	Tennessee	Democratic-Republican	1793–1863
Sam Houston	1825–1827	Tennessee	Democratic	1793–1863
Victor S. K. Houston	1927–1933	Hawaii	Republican	1876–1959
William C. Houston	1905–1919	Tennessee	Democratic	1852–1931
Alvin Peterson Hovey	1887–1889	Indiana	Republican	1821–1891
Benjamin Howard	1807–1810	Kentucky	Democratic-Republican	1760–1814
Benjamin Chew Howard	1829–1833; 1835–1839	Maryland	Democratic	1791–1872
Edgar Howard	1923–1935	Nebraska	Democratic	1858–1951
Everette B. Howard	1919–1921; 1923–1925; 1927–1929	Oklahoma	Democratic	1873–1950
Jacob M. Howard	1841–1843	Michigan	Whig	1805–1871
James J. Howard	1965–1988	New Jersey	Democratic	1927–1988
Jonas G. Howard	1885–1889	Indiana	Democratic	1825–1911
Milford W. Howard	1895–1899	Alabama	Populist	1862–1937
Tilghman Howard	1839–1840	Indiana	Democratic	1797–1844
Volney Howard	1849–1853	Texas	Democratic	1809–1889
William Howard	1859–1861	Ohio	Democratic	1817–1891
William Alanson Howard	1855–1857	Michigan	Oppositionist	1813–1880
William Alanson Howard	1857–1859; 1860–1861	Michigan	Republican	1813–1880
William M. Howard	1897–1911	Georgia	Democratic	1857–1932
William S. Howard	1911–1919	Georgia	Democratic	1875–1953
Albert R. Howe	1873–1875	Mississippi	Republican	1840–1884
Allan Turner Howe	1975–1977	Utah	Democratic	1927–2000
James R. Howe	1895–1899	New York	Republican	1839–1914
John W. Howe	1849–1851	Pennsylvania	Free Soiler	1801–1873
John W. Howe	1841–1853	Pennsylvania	Whig	1801–1873
Thomas Marshall Howe	1851–1855	Pennsylvania	Whig	1808–1877
Thomas Y. Howe Jr.	1851–1853	New York	Democratic	1801–1860
Benjamin F. Howell	1895–1911	New Jersey	Republican	1844–1933
Charles R. Howell	1949–1955	New Jersey	Democratic	1904–1973
Edward Howell	1833–1835	New York	Democratic	1792–1871
Elias Howell	1835–1837	Ohio	Whig	1792–1844
George Howell	1903–1904	Pennsylvania	Democratic	1859–1913
George Evan Howell	1941–1947	Illinois	Republican	1905–1980
Joseph Howell	1903–1917	Utah	Republican	1857–1918
Nathaniel W. Howell	1813–1815	New York	Federalist	1770–1851
Benjamin Franklin Howey	1883–1885	New Jersey	Republican	1828–1893
L. Paul Howland	1907–1913	Ohio	Republican	1865–1942
Stephen A. Hoxworth	1913–1915	Illinois	Democratic	1860–1930
Roman Hruska	1953–1954	Nebraska	Republican	1904–1999
Edmund W. Hubard	1841–1847	Virginia	Democratic	1806–1878
Asahel W. Hubbard	1863–1869	Iowa	Republican	1819–1879
Carroll Hubbard	1975–1993	Kentucky	Democratic	1937–2022
Chester D. Hubbard	1865–1867	West Virginia	Unconditional Unionist	1814–1891
Chester D. Hubbard	1867–1869	West Virginia	Republican	1814–1891
David Hubbard	1839–1841; 1849–1851	Alabama	Democratic	1792–1874
Demas Hubbard Jr.	1865–1867	New York	Republican	1806–1873
Elbert H. Hubbard	1905–1912	Iowa	Republican	1849–1912
Henry Hubbard	1829–1835	New Hampshire	Democratic	1784–1857
Joel D. Hubbard	1895–1897	Missouri	Republican	1860–1919
John Henry Hubbard	1863–1867	Connecticut	Republican	1804–1872
Jonathan H. Hubbard	1809–1811	Vermont	Federalist	1768–1849
Levi Hubbard	1813–1815	Massachusetts	Democratic-Republican	1762–1836
Richard D. Hubbard	1867–1869	Connecticut	Democratic	1818–1884
Samuel Dickinson Hubbard	1845–1849	Connecticut	Whig	1799–1855
Thomas H. Hubbard	1817–1819; 1821–1823	New York	Democratic–Republican	1781–1857
William Pallister Hubbard	1907–1911	West Virginia	Republican	1843–1921
Edwin N. Hubbell	1865–1867	New York	Democratic	1815–1897
James Randolph Hubbell	1865–1867	Ohio	Republican	1824–1890
Jay Hubbell	1873–1883	Michigan	Republican	1829–1900
William Spring Hubbell	1843–1845	New York	Democratic	1801–1873
Orlando Hubbs	1881–1883	North Carolina	Republican	1840–1930
Robert J. Huber	1973–1975	Michigan	Republican	1922–2001
Walter B. Huber	1945–1951	Ohio	Democratic	1903–1982
Edward Burd Hubley	1835–1839	Pennsylvania	Democratic	1792–1856
Winnifred Mason Huck	1922–1923	Illinois	Republican	1882–1936
Jerry Huckaby	1977–1993	Louisiana	Democratic	1941–present
Thomas R. Hudd	1886–1889	Wisconsin	Democratic	1835–1896
George Huddleston	1915–1937	Alabama	Democratic	1869–1960
George Huddleston Jr.	1955–1965	Alabama	Democratic	1920–1971
William H. Hudnut III	1973–1975	Indiana	Republican	1932–2016
Charles Hudson	1841–1849	Massachusetts	Whig	1795–1881
Grant M. Hudson	1923–1931	Michigan	Republican	1868–1955
Thomas Jefferson Hudson	1893–1895	Kansas	Populist	1839–1923
Claude Hudspeth	1919–1931	Texas	Democratic	1877–1941
Tim Huelskamp	2011–2017	Kansas	Republican	1968–present
George F. Huff	1891–1893; 1895–1897; 1903–1911	Pennsylvania	Republican	1842–1912
Michael Huffington	1993–1995	California	Republican	1947–present
Jacob Hufty	1809–1813	New Jersey	Democratic-Republican	1750–1814
Jacob Hufty	1813–1814	New Jersey	Federalist	1750–1814
Benjamin Huger	1799–1805; 1815–1817	South Carolina	Federalist	1768–1823
Daniel Huger	1789–1793	South Carolina	Pro-Administration	1742–1799
Charles Hughes	1853–1855	New York	Democratic	1822–1887
Dudley M. Hughes	1909–1917	Georgia	Democratic	1848–1927
George W. Hughes	1859–1861	Maryland	Democratic	1806–1870
James Hughes	1857–1859	Indiana	Democratic	1823–1873
James A. Hughes	1901–1915; 1927–1930	West Virginia	Republican	1861–1930
James F. Hughes	1933–1935	Wisconsin	Democratic	1883–1940
James Madison Hughes	1843–1845	Missouri	Democratic	1809–1861
Thomas H. Hughes	1829–1833	New Jersey	National Republican	1769–1839
William Hughes	1903–1905; 1907–1912	New Jersey	Democratic	1872–1918
William J. Hughes	1975–1995	New Jersey	Democratic	1932–2019
Jonas A. Hughston	1855–1857	New York	Oppositionist	1808–1862
Daniel Hugunin Jr.	1825–1827	New York	National Republican	1790–1850
Theodore W. Hukriede	1921–1923	Missouri	Republican	1878–1945
George Murray Hulbert	1915–1918	New York	Democratic	1881–1950
John W. Hulbert	1814–1817	Massachusetts	Federalist	1770–1831
Calvin T. Hulburd	1863–1869	New York	Republican	1809–1897
George W. Hulick	1893–1897	Ohio	Republican	1833–1907
James H. Huling	1895–1897	West Virginia	Republican	1844–1918
Willis J. Hulings	1913–1915	Pennsylvania	Progressive	1850–1924
Willis J. Hulings	1919–1921	Pennsylvania	Republican	1850–1924
Cordell Hull	1907–1921; 1923–1931	Tennessee	Democratic	1871–1955
Harry E. Hull	1915–1925	Iowa	Republican	1864–1938
John A. T. Hull	1891–1911	Iowa	Republican	1841–1928
Merlin Hull	1929–1931	Wisconsin	Republican	1870–1953
Merlin Hull	1935–1947	Wisconsin	Progressive	1870–1953
Merlin Hull	1947–1953	Wisconsin	Republican	1870–1953
Morton D. Hull	1923–1933	Illinois	Republican	1867–1937
Noble A. Hull	1879–1881	Florida	Democratic	1827–1907
William E. Hull	1923–1933	Illinois	Republican	1866–1942
William R. Hull Jr.	1955–1973	Missouri	Democratic	1906–1977
Kenny Hulshof	1997–2009	Missouri	Republican	1958–present
Randy Hultgren	2011–2019	Illinois	Republican	1966–present
Augustin Reed Humphrey	1922–1923	Nebraska	Republican	1859–1937
Charles Humphrey	1825–1827	New York	National Republican	1792–1850
Herman L. Humphrey	1877–1883	Wisconsin	Republican	1830–1902
James Humphrey	1859–1861; 1865–1866	New York	Republican	1811–1866
James M. Humphrey	1865–1869	New York	Democratic	1819–1899
Reuben Humphrey	1807–1809	New York	Democratic–Republican	1757–1831
William E. Humphrey	1903–1917	Washington	Republican	1862–1934
Andrew Humphreys	1876–1877	Indiana	Democratic	1821–1904
Benjamin G. Humphreys II	1903–1923	Mississippi	Democratic	1865–1923
Parry Wayne Humphreys	1813–1815	Tennessee	Democratic-Republican	1778–1839
William Y. Humphreys	1923–1925	Mississippi	Democratic	1890–1933
William L. Hungate	1964–1977	Missouri	Democratic	1922–2007
John Hungerford	1811; 1813–1817	Virginia	Democratic-Republican	1761–1833
John N. Hungerford	1877–1879	New York	Republican	1825–1883
Orville Hungerford	1843–1847	New York	Democratic	1790–1851
Carleton Hunt	1883–1885	Louisiana	Democratic	1836–1921
Hiram P. Hunt	1835–1837	New York	National Republican	1796–1865
Hiram P. Hunt	1839–1843	New York	Whig	1796–1865
James B. Hunt	1843–1847	Michigan	Democratic	1799–1857
John E. Hunt	1967–1975	New Jersey	Republican	1908–1989
John T. Hunt	1903–1907	Missouri	Democratic	1860–1916
Jonathan Hunt	1827–1832	Vermont	National Republican	1787–1832
Samuel Hunt	1802–1805	New Hampshire	Federalist	1765–1807
Theodore G. Hunt	1853–1855	Louisiana	Whig	1805–1893
Washington Hunt	1843–1849	New York	Whig	1811–1867
Allan O. Hunter	1951–1955	California	Republican	1916–1995
Andrew J. Hunter	1893–1895; 1897–1899	Illinois	Democratic	1831–1913
Duncan D. Hunter	2009–2020	California	Republican	1976–present
Duncan L. Hunter	1981–2009	California	Republican	1948–present
John Hunter	1793–1795	South Carolina	Anti-Administration	c. 1750–1802
John F. Hunter	1937–1943	Ohio	Democratic	1896–1957
John W. Hunter	1866–1867	New York	Democratic	1807–1900
Morton C. Hunter	1867–1869; 1873–1879	Indiana	Republican	1825–1896
Narsworthy Hunter	1801–1802	Mississippi	Democratic-Republican	c. 1756–1802
Robert M. T. Hunter	1837–1843	Virginia	Whig	1809–1887
Robert M. T. Hunter	1845–1847	Virginia	Democratic	1809–1887
W. Godfrey Hunter	1887–1889; 1895–1897; 1903–1905	Kentucky	Republican	1841–1917
William Hunter	1817–1819	Vermont	Democratic-Republican	1754–1827
William F. Hunter	1849–1853	Ohio	Whig	1808–1874
William H. Hunter	1837–1839	Ohio	Democratic	????–1842
Abel Huntington	1833–1837	New York	Democratic	1777–1858
Benjamin Huntington	1789–1791	Connecticut	Pro-Administration	1736–1800
Ebenezer Huntington	1810–1811; 1817–1819	Connecticut	Federalist	1754–1834
Jabez W. Huntington	1829–1834	Connecticut	National Republican	1788–1847
Eppa Hunton	1873–1881	Virginia	Democratic	1822–1908
Adam Huntsman	1835–1837	Tennessee	Democratic	1786–1849
J. Oliva Huot	1965–1967	New Hampshire	Democratic	1917–1983
Frank H. Hurd	1875–1877; 1879–1881; 1883–1885	Ohio	Democratic	1840–1896
Will Hurd	2015–2021	Texas	Republican	1977–present
Stephen A. Hurlbut	1873–1877	Illinois	Republican	1815–1882
Denis M. Hurley	1895–1899	New York	Republican	1843–1899
Robert Hurt	2011–2017	Virginia	Republican	1969–present
James W. Husted	1915–1923	New York	Republican	1870–1925
Joseph C. Hutcheson	1893–1897	Texas	Democratic	1842–1924
John Hutchins	1859–1863	Ohio	Republican	1812–1891
Waldo Hutchins	1879–1885	New York	Democratic	1822–1891
Wells A. Hutchins	1863–1865	Ohio	Democratic	1818–1895
Asa Hutchinson	1997–2001	Arkansas	Republican	1950–present
Elijah C. Hutchinson	1915–1923	New Jersey	Republican	1855–1932
J. Edward Hutchinson	1963–1977	Michigan	Republican	1914–1985
John G. Hutchinson	1980–1981	West Virginia	Democratic	1935–2024
Tim Hutchinson	1993–1997	Arkansas	Republican	1949–present
Earl Hutto	1979–1995	Florida	Democratic	1926–2020
John E. Hutton	1885–1889	Missouri	Democratic	1828–1893
John Huyler	1857–1859	New Jersey	Democratic	1808–1870
DeWitt Hyde	1953–1959	Maryland	Republican	1909–1986
Henry Hyde	1975–2007	Illinois	Republican	1924–2007
Ira B. Hyde	1873–1875	Missouri	Republican	1838–1926
Samuel C. Hyde	1895–1897	Washington	Republican	1842–1922
John Adams Hyman	1875–1877	North Carolina	Republican	1840–1891
John M. Hyneman	1811–1813	Pennsylvania	Democratic-Republican	1771–1816
William Joseph Hynes	1873–1875	Arkansas	Liberal Republican	1843–1915
