= Roger Vose =

American politician

Roger Vose (February 24, 1763 - October 26, 1841) was a United States representative from New Hampshire. He was born in Milton, Massachusetts. He moved to New Hampshire in 1766 with his parents, who settled near Walpole. He graduated from Harvard University in 1790. After graduation, he studied law and was admitted to the bar in 1793 and commenced practice.

Vose was a member of the New Hampshire Senate in 1809, 1810, and 1812. He was elected as a Federalist to the Thirteenth and Fourteenth Congresses (March 4, 1813 – March 3, 1817). Later, he served as member of the New Hampshire House of Representatives in 1818. He was chief justice of the court of common pleas 1818-1820 and the chief justice of the court of sessions 1820–1825. He then resumed the practice of law. He died in Walpole, New Hampshire in 1841 and was buried in the Village Cemetery.

U.S. House of Representatives
Preceded by John A. Harper	Member of the U.S. House of Representatives from New Hampshire's at-large congressional district 1813-1817	Succeeded by Salma Hale
