= Francis Thomas =

American politician (1799-1876)

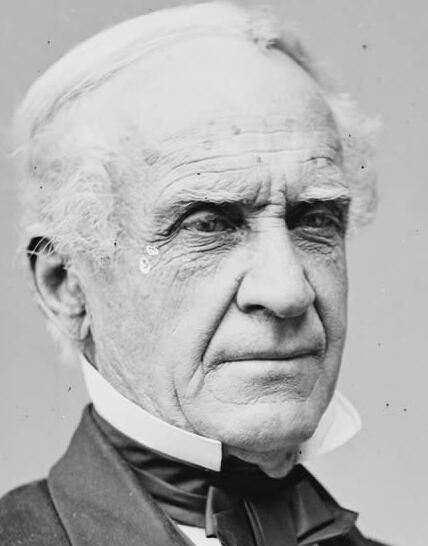

United States Minister to Peru
- In office July 10, 1872 – July 5, 1875
- President: Ulysses S. Grant
- Preceded by: Thomas Settle
- Succeeded by: Richard Gibbs

26th Governor of Maryland
- In office January 3, 1842 – January 6, 1845
- Preceded by: William Grason
- Succeeded by: Thomas Pratt

Member of the U.S. House of Representatives from Maryland
- In office March 4, 1831 – March 3, 1841
- Preceded by: Michael Sprigg (4th); John L. Kerr (7th); William C. Johnson (6th)
- Succeeded by: James P. Heath (4th); Daniel Jenifer (7th); John T. Mason, Jr. (6th)
- Constituency: 4th district (1831-33); 7th district (1833–35); 6th district (1835-41)
- In office March 4, 1861 – March 3, 1869
- Preceded by: Jacob M. Kunkel (5th); Henry May (4th)
- Succeeded by: Benjamin G. Harris (5th); Patrick Hamill (4th)
- Constituency: 5th district (1861-63); 4th district (1863-69)

Chair of the House Judiciary Committee
- In office 1836–1839
- Preceded by: Samuel Beardsley
- Succeeded by: John Sergeant

Collector of Internal Revenue for Maryland
- In office 1870–1872

Speaker of the Maryland House of Delegates
- In office 1829
- Preceded by: John Grant Chapman
- Succeeded by: Richard Thomas

Member of the Maryland House of Delegates
- In office 1822; 1827; 1829

Personal details
- Born: February 3, 1799 Frederick County, Maryland, U.S.
- Died: January 22, 1876 (age 76) Frankville, Maryland, U.S.
- Party: Democrat; Union; Unconditional Union; Republican

Francis Thomas (February 3, 1799 – January 22, 1876) was an American politician who served as the 26th governor of Maryland from 1842 to 1845. He also served as a United States representative from Maryland, representing at separate times the fourth, fifth, sixth, and seventh districts. He also served as United States minister to Peru from 1872 to 1875, and speaker of the Maryland House of Delegates in 1829.

== Early life and career ==
Thomas was born in Frederick County, Maryland, close to South Mountain, known as "Merryland tract", and attended St. John's College of Annapolis, Maryland. He later studied law, and was admitted to the bar in 1820, commencing practice in Frankville, Maryland.

== Maryland House of Delegates ==
He entered politics after becoming a member of the Maryland House of Delegates in 1822, 1827, and 1829, and served the last year as 34th Speaker of the House.

== First tenure in the United States House of Representatives ==
Thomas was elected as a Jacksonian to the Twenty-second through Twenty-fourth Congresses and as a Democrat to the Twenty-fifth and Twenty-sixth Congresses, serving from March 4, 1831 until March 3, 1841). In Congress, he served as chairman of the Committee on the Judiciary (Twenty-fourth and Twenty-fifth Congresses), and as a member of the Committee on Naval Affairs (Twenty-sixth Congress). He also served as president of the Chesapeake & Ohio Canal Company in 1839 and 1840.

== Governor of Maryland ==
In 1841, Thomas was elected Governor of Maryland, defeating challenger William Cost Johnson by a margin of 600 votes. During his tenure as governor, he is perhaps best known for his highly publicized and violent divorce with his wife, Sally Campbell Preston McDowell. McDowell had left the marriage over claims of "violent jealous rages [that] made her fear for her life" and that prompted her father, Virginia Governor James McDowell, to seek out a bill of divorce from the Virginia General Assembly. Until that event, he had been a leading candidate for Democratic nomination for President of the United States, but the divorce seriously disrupted his chances in succeeding in the nomination, and thus he did not pursue it.

As governor, Thomas inherited a major state deficit that he would not resolve in his tenure. He proposed a direct tax upon the people, which was widely unpopular, and did not raise adequate funds to allow repudiation of the debt. He was also a staunch opponent of slavery, a unique position in a border-state like Maryland, decrying it as "altogether unworthy of enlightened statesmen, and should be by all patriots repudiated". He served as governor from 1842 until 1845, narrowly beating William Cost Johnson, who he succeeded as Maryland's 6th district congressman, in 1841 for a three-year term. Thomas was an unsuccessful candidate for reelection in 1844.

== Return to Congress ==
After his term as governor, Thomas served as a member of the Maryland State Constitutional convention in 1850. He was again elected to the Thirty-seventh Congress as a Unionist, as an Unconditional Unionist to the Thirty-eighth and Thirty-ninth Congresses, and as a Republican to the Fortieth Congress, serving from March 4, 1861 until March 3, 1869. When he left the House in 1869, he had served a total nine terms over almost four decades.

While in the House, Thomas served as a delegate to the 1866 National Union Convention at Philadelphia, Pennsylvania.

== Collector of internal revenue for Maryland ==
Thomas served as collector of internal revenue for Maryland from 1870 until 1872.

== Minister to Peru ==
Thomas was appointed by President Grant to serve as the United States Minister to Peru, and help this position from March 25, 1872 to July 9, 1875.

== Retirement and death ==
After leaving the ministership to Peru he retired from public and professional life and devoted his time to agricultural pursuits.

On January 22, 1876, while overseeing improvements on his estate near Frankville, Maryland, a community that once existed along the Baltimore and Ohio Railroad in Garrett County, Thomas was killed instantly when he was struck by a locomotive. He is interred in a vault in Rose Hill Cemetery of Cumberland, Maryland.

Party political offices
Preceded by William Grason	Democratic nominee for Governor of Maryland; 1841	Succeeded by James Carroll
Political offices
Preceded by William Grason	Governor of Maryland; 1842–1845	Succeeded by Thomas Pratt
Maryland House of Delegates
Preceded by John Grant Chapman	Speaker of the Maryland House of Delegates; 1829	Succeeded by Richard Thomas
U.S. House of Representatives
Preceded by Michael C. Sprigg	Member of the U.S. House of Representatives from Maryland's 4th congressional district 1831–1833	Succeeded by James P. Heath
Preceded by John Leeds Kerr	Member of the U.S. House of Representatives from Maryland's 7th congressional district 1833–1835	Succeeded by Daniel Jenifer
Preceded by William Cost Johnson	Member of the U.S. House of Representatives from Maryland's 6th congressional district 1835–1841	Succeeded by John Thomson Mason Jr.
Preceded by Jacob Michael Kunkel	Member of the U.S. House of Representatives from Maryland's 5th congressional district 1861–1863	Succeeded by Benjamin G. Harris
Preceded by Henry May	Member of the U.S. House of Representatives from Maryland's 4th congressional district 1863–1869	Succeeded by Patrick Hamill
Diplomatic posts
Preceded by Thomas Settle	United States Minister to Peru; July 10, 1872 – July 5, 1875	Succeeded by Richard Gibbs
