= Salma Hale =

American politician

Member of the U.S. House of Representatives from New Hampshire's at-large district
- In office March 4, 1817 – March 4, 1819
- Preceded by: Charles H. Atherton
- Succeeded by: Joseph Buffum, Jr.

New Hampshire Senate
- In office 1845–1846

New Hampshire Senate
- In office 1824–1825

New Hampshire House of Representatives
- In office 1844–1844

New Hampshire House of Representatives
- In office 1828–1828

New Hampshire House of Representatives
- In office 1823–1823

Personal details
- Born: March 7, 1787 Alstead, Cheshire County; New Hampshire, USA
- Died: November 19, 1866 (aged 79) Somerville, Middlesex County; Massachusetts, USA
- Resting place: Woodland Cemetery; Keene, Cheshire County; New Hampshire, USA
- Party: Democratic-Republican
- Spouse: Sarah Kellogg King Hale
- Children: William King Hale; Sarah King Hale; George Silsbee Hale
- Occupation: Printer editor lawyer politician author

Salma Hale (March 7, 1787 – November 19, 1866) was an American politician, writer, editor, and a United States representative from New Hampshire.

== Early life ==
Hale was born in Alstead, Cheshire County, New Hampshire. He became apprentice as a printer at the age of thirteen and in 1805 edited the Walpole Political Observatory. He was a student of law with Roger Vose, Samuel Dinsmoor, and Phineas Handerson.

== Career ==
Hale was appointed clerk of the court of common pleas of Cheshire County. He moved to Keene, Cheshire County
New Hampshire in 1813. In 1814, he served as the secretary to the commission appointed under the Treaty of Ghent for determining the northeastern boundary line of the United States.

Elected as a Democratic-Republican to the Fifteenth Congress, Hale served as United States representative for the state of New Hampshire from March 4, 1817, to March 3, 1819. He was not a candidate for renomination in 1818.

After leaving Congress, he was clerk of the New Hampshire Supreme Court from 1817 to 1834. He was admitted to the bar in October 1834. He was a member of the New Hampshire House of Representatives in 1823, 1828, and again in 1844. He also served in the New Hampshire Senate in 1824, 1825, and again in 1845 and 1846.

== Death ==
Hale died in Somerville, Middlesex County, Massachusetts, on November 19, 1866 (age 79 years, 257 days). He is interred at Woodland Cemetery, Keene, Cheshire County, New Hampshire.

== Personal life ==
Hale married Sarah Kellogg King on January 20, 1820, and they had three children, William King, Sarah King, and George Silsbee Hale. He was also the author of a popular early US history textbook, History of the United States of America, which was published in several editions between 1820 and 1848. The earlier editions of the book used his pseudonym, "A Citizen of Massachusetts." In the 1846 and later editions, his name is printed as the author.

U.S. House of Representatives
Preceded by Charles H. Atherton	Member of the U.S. House of Representatives from New Hampshire; 1817–1819	Succeeded by Joseph Buffum, Jr.
