= John Adams Harper =

American politician

Member of the U.S. House of Representatives from New Hampshire's at-large district
- In office March 4, 1811 – March 3, 1813
- Preceded by: Nathaniel A. Haven
- Succeeded by: Roger Vose

Member of the New Hampshire House of Representatives
- In office 1809–1810

Member of the New Hampshire Senate
- In office 1805–1808

Personal details
- Born: November 2, 1779 Derryfield, Hillsborough County; New Hampshire, United States
- Died: June 18, 1816 (aged 36) Meredith Bridge (now Laconia; Belknap County); New Hampshire, United States
- Resting place: Union Cemetery; Laconia, Belknap County; New Hampshire, United States
- Party: Democratic-Republican
- Education: Phillips Exeter Academy
- Profession: Farmer; innkeeper; surveyor; politician; judge

Military service
- Allegiance: United States
- Branch/service: New Hampshire State Militia
- Years of service: 1809–1812

John Adams Harper (November 2, 1779 – June 18, 1816) was an American politician and a United States Representative from New Hampshire.

== Early life ==
Born in Derryfield, New Hampshire, Harper attended Phillips Exeter Academy in 1794. He studied law and was admitted to the bar about 1802, commencing practice in Sanbornton.

== Career ==
Harper was the first postmaster of Sanbornton, then moved to Meredith Bridge (now Laconia, Belknap County) in 1806. He served as clerk of the New Hampshire Senate, 1805–1808, was a member of the New Hampshire House of Representatives in 1809 and 1810. He served in the State militia, 1809–1812.

Elected as a Democratic-Republican to the Twelfth Congress, Harper served as United States Representative for the state of New Hampshire from (March 4, 1811 – March 3, 1813). He supported the Declaration of War in June 1812, and was an unsuccessful candidate for reelection in 1812 to the Thirteenth Congress.

== Death ==
Harper died at Meredith Bridge (now Laconia), New Hampshire, on June 18, 1816, (age 36 years, 229 days). He is interred in Union Cemetery, Laconia, Belknap County, New Hampshire.

U.S. House of Representatives
Preceded by Nathaniel A. Haven	Member of the U.S. House of Representatives from New Hampshire; 1811-1813	Succeeded by Roger Vose
