= Patrick Hamill =

American politician

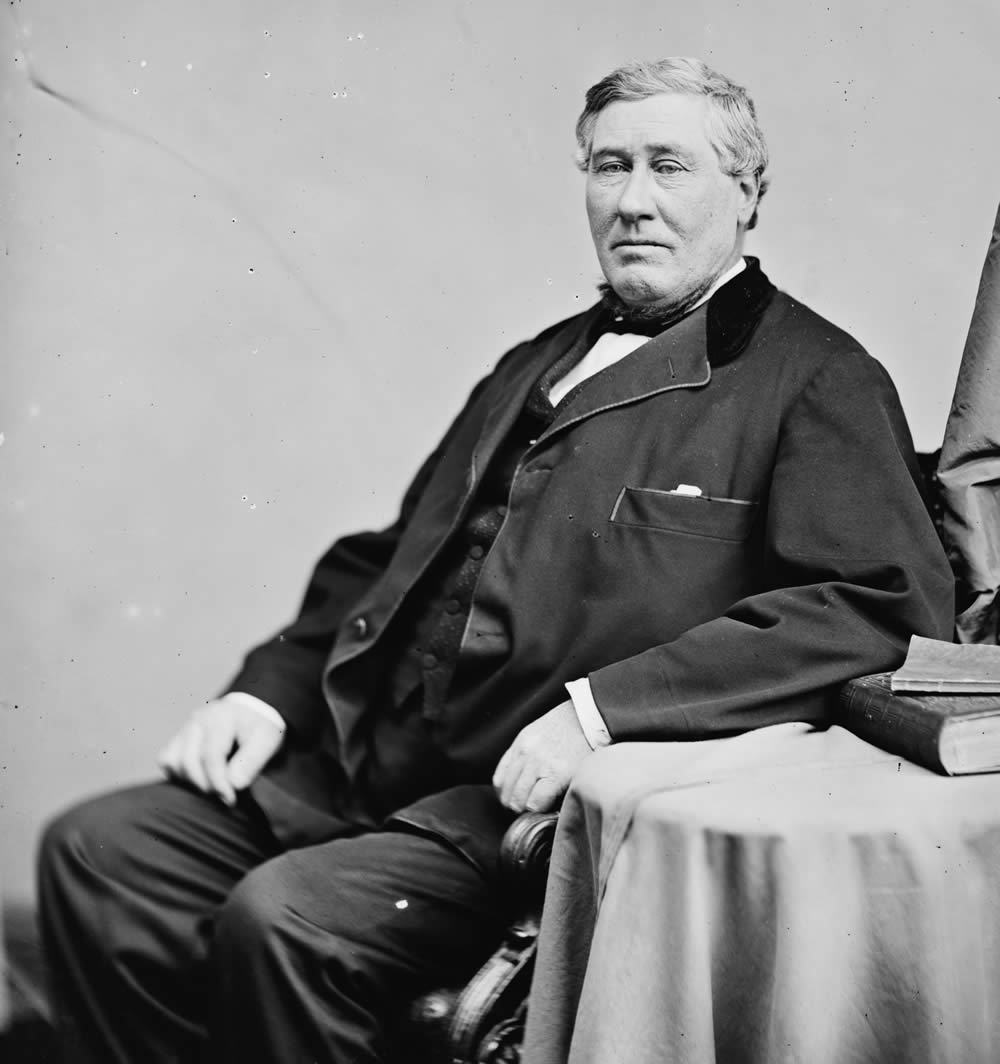
Patrick Hamill

Patrick Hamill (April 28, 1817 – January 15, 1895) was a US Representative from the fourth district of Maryland, serving one term from 1869 to 1871.

== Biography ==
Hamill attended the common schools in Westernport, Maryland, and engaged in the real estate business and mercantile pursuits and was collector of taxes in 1841 and 1842. He served as a member of the Maryland House of Delegates in 1843 and 1844, was a judge of the orphans’ court of Allegany County, Maryland, from 1854 until 1869, and was elected chief judge in 1867. He was elected as a Democrat to the Forty-first Congress, serving from March 4, 1869, until March 3, 1871, but was not a candidate for renomination in 1870. He later engaged in the real estate business until his death in Oakland, Maryland, and is interred in Odd Fellows Cemetery.

U.S. House of Representatives
Preceded by Francis Thomas	Representative of the Fourth Congressional District of Maryland; 1869–1871	Succeeded by John Ritchie
