= Nathaniel Appleton Haven =

American politician

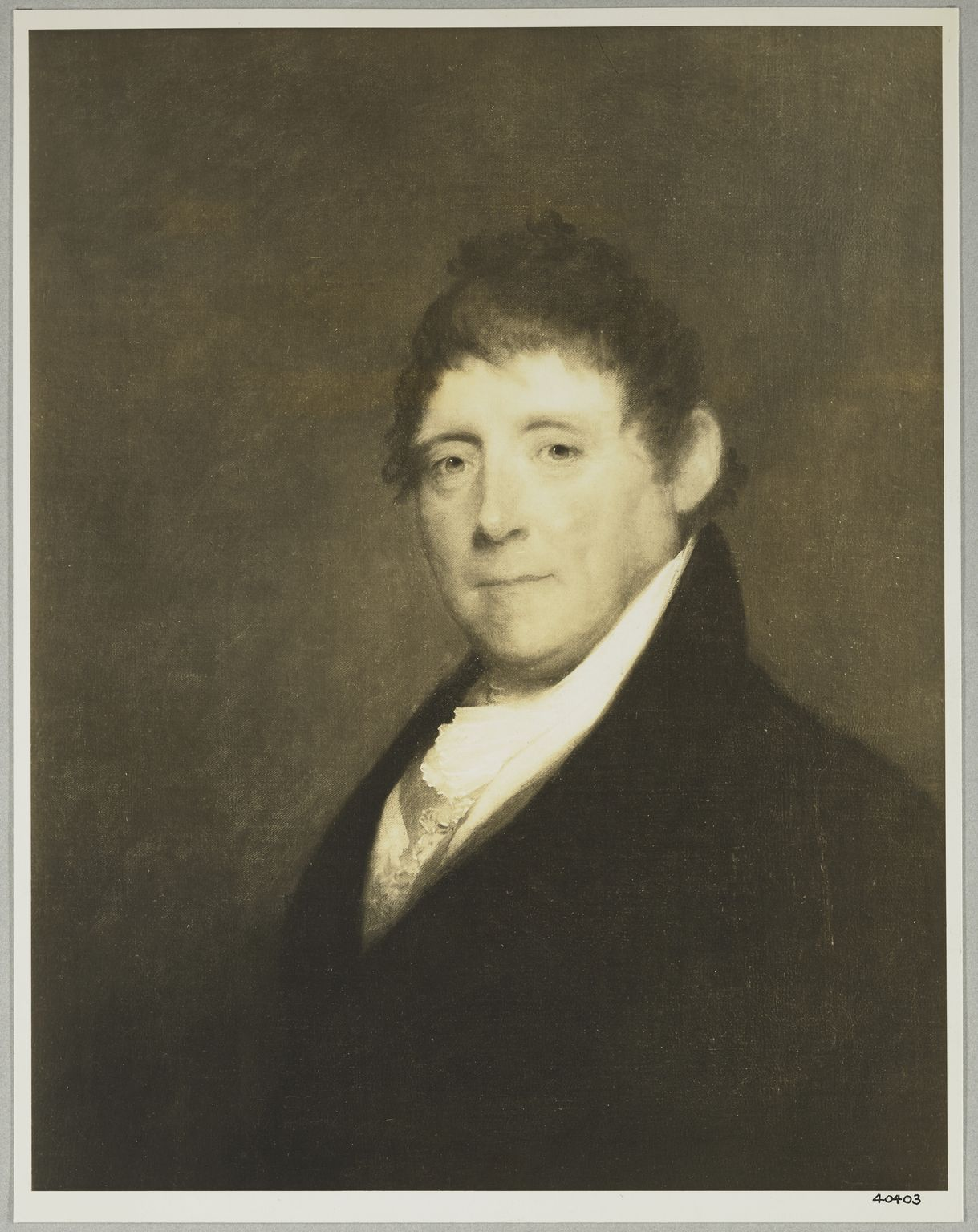
- Portrait by Gilbert Stuart

Member of the U.S. House of Representatives from New Hampshire's At large district
- In office March 4, 1809 – March 3, 1811
- Preceded by: Jedediah K. Smith
- Succeeded by: John A. Harper

Personal details
- Born: July 19, 1762 Portsmouth, New Hampshire, British America
- Died: March 13, 1831 (aged 68) Portsmouth, New Hampshire, U.S.
- Resting place: Proprietors' Burying Ground; Portsmouth, New Hampshire, U.S.
- Party: Federalist
- Spouse: Mary Tufton Moffat Haven
- Children: Maria Tufton Haven; Nathaniel Appleton Haven; Charlotte Ann Haven
- Parent(s): Samuel Haven; Mehitable Appleton Haven
- Education: Harvard College, 1779
- Profession: Physician; Editor; Politician

Military service
- Branch/service: Continental Navy
- Rank: Ship's Surgeon
- Battles/wars: American Revolutionary War

Nathaniel Appleton Haven (July 19, 1762 – March 13, 1831) was an American politician, a physician, and served as a U.S. Representative from New Hampshire.

== Early life ==
Haven was born in Portsmouth in the Province of New Hampshire. He attended Phillips Exeter Academy, where he graduated in 1807 with distinctions. He then pursued classical studies, was educated by the Reverend Dr. Nathaniel Appleton, and graduated in medicine from Harvard College in 1779.

== Career ==
Haven practiced his profession in Portsmouth and also engaged in mercantile pursuits. His son, Nathaniel A. Haven, Jr., was editor of the Portsmouth Journal until 1825.

Serving as a ship's surgeon in the latter part of the Revolutionary War, Haven was captured by the British and was a prisoner of war aboard the Jersey prison ship at New York for a short time.

Elected as a Federalist to the Eleventh Congress, Haven served as United States Representative for the state of New Hampshire from (March 4, 1809 – March 3, 1811).

== Death ==
Haven died in Portsmouth, on March 13, 1831, and is interred at Proprietors' Burying Ground. Died March 13, 1831 (age 68 years, 237 days). Interment at Proprietors' Burying Ground, Portsmouth, N.H.

== Family life ==
Son to Samuel Haven and Mehitable Appleton, Haven married Mary Tufton Moffat, and they had three children, Maria Tufton Haven, Nathaniel Appleton Haven, Jr., and Charlotte Ann Haven.

U.S. House of Representatives
Preceded by Jedediah K. Smith	Member of the U.S. House of Representatives from New Hampshire; 1809-1811	Succeeded by John A. Harper
