= Benjamin G. Harris =

American politician

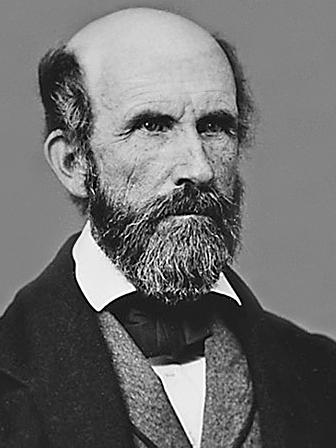
- Harris, c. 1863

Member of the U.S. House of Representatives from Maryland's 5th district
- In office March 4, 1863 – March 3, 1867
- Preceded by: Francis Thomas
- Succeeded by: Frederick Stone

Personal details
- Born: Benjamin Gwinn Harris; December 13, 1805 near Leonardtown, Maryland, U.S.
- Died: April 4, 1895 (aged 89) near Leonardtown, Maryland, U.S.
- Party: Democratic
- Education: Yale University; Harvard University

Benjamin Gwinn Harris (December 13, 1805 – April 4, 1895) was a U.S. representative from Maryland.

Born near Leonardtown, St. Mary's County, Maryland, Harris attended Yale College in the late 1820s, and Harvard Law School from 1829 to 1830. He served as a member of the Maryland House of Delegates in 1833 and 1836, and was admitted to the bar in 1840. Harris was removed from Yale after taking part in a student protest against the poor quality of the food in the campus housing.

While serving in the Maryland State House of Delegates, he opposed the Know-Nothing Party and championed religious freedom. But as the Civil War loomed, he also sought to enforce slavery, including the re-enslavement of Maryland's freedmen.

Harris was elected as a Democrat to the Thirty-eighth and Thirty-ninth Congresses (March 4, 1863 – March 3, 1867). During the Civil War, he voted against every war appropriations measure brought to the House of Representatives. His vote on the Thirteenth Amendment to abolish slavery is recorded as nay. In his defense of Congressman Alexander Long, Harris openly prayed for a southern victory on the floor of the House. He was therefore censured by the House of Representatives on April 9, 1864, for treasonable utterances. In addition, he was tried by a military court in Washington, D.C. in May 1865 for harboring two paroled Confederate soldiers, and sentenced to three years imprisonment and forever disqualified from holding any office under the United States Government. U.S. President Andrew Johnson pardoned Harris several weeks later.

He died on his estate, "Ellenborough," near Leonardtown, Maryland, April 4, 1895. He was interred in the family burying ground on his estate.

== See also ==
- List of United States representatives expelled, censured, or reprimanded

U.S. House of Representatives
| Preceded by Francis Thomas | Member of the U.S. House of Representatives from Maryland's 5th congressional district 1863–1867 | Succeeded by Frederick Stone |
