= James P. Heath =

American politician

James P. Heath (December 21, 1777 – June 12, 1854) was a United States congressman from Maryland.

== Biography ==
=== Early life ===
Heath was born in Delaware. He served in the Regular Army as lieutenant of Engineers from 1799 to 1802, as register in chancery in Annapolis, Maryland, and served throughout the War of 1812 as aide-de-camp to General Levin Winder.

=== Political life ===
He was elected as a Jacksonian to the Twenty-third Congress, where he served from March 4, 1833, to March 3, 1835. He was an unsuccessful candidate for reelection in 1834 to the Twenty-fourth Congress.

=== Death ===
He died in Georgetown, Washington, D.C., and is interred in Oak Hill Cemetery in Georgetown.

U.S. House of Representatives
Preceded by Francis Thomas	Member of the U.S. House of Representatives from Maryland's 4th congressional district 1833–1835	Succeeded by Benjamin Chew Howard and Isaac McKim
