= Gilman Garrison House =

Historic house in New Hampshire, United States

- U.S. National Register of Historic Places
- U.S. Historic district – Contributing property
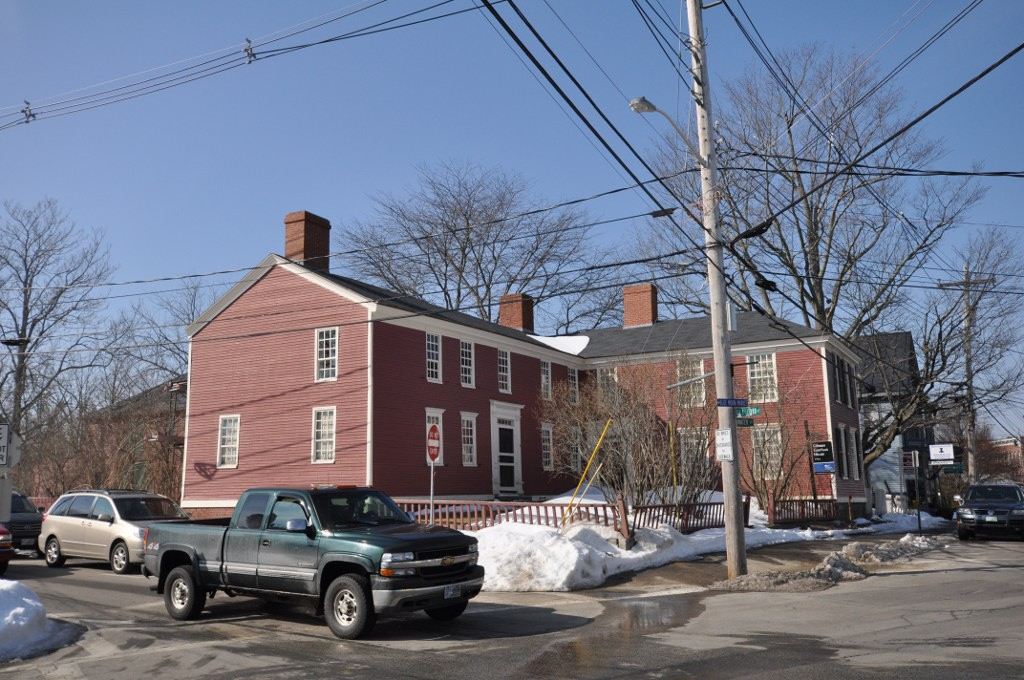

- Location within New Hampshire Location within the United States
- Location: 12 Water St., Exeter, New Hampshire
- Coordinates: 42°58′50″N 70°56′42″W
- Built: 1709
- Part of: Exeter Waterfront Commercial Historic District (ID80000299)
- NRHP reference No.: 76000131

Significant dates
- Added to NRHP: September 27, 1976
- Designated CP: December 3, 1980

The Gilman Garrison House is a historic house museum at 12 Water Street in Exeter, New Hampshire. Built in 1709, it is a rare surviving example of a garrison house or fortified structure. It is owned by Historic New England, which operates the home as a house museum, and was listed on the National Register of Historic Places in 1976.

== Description ==
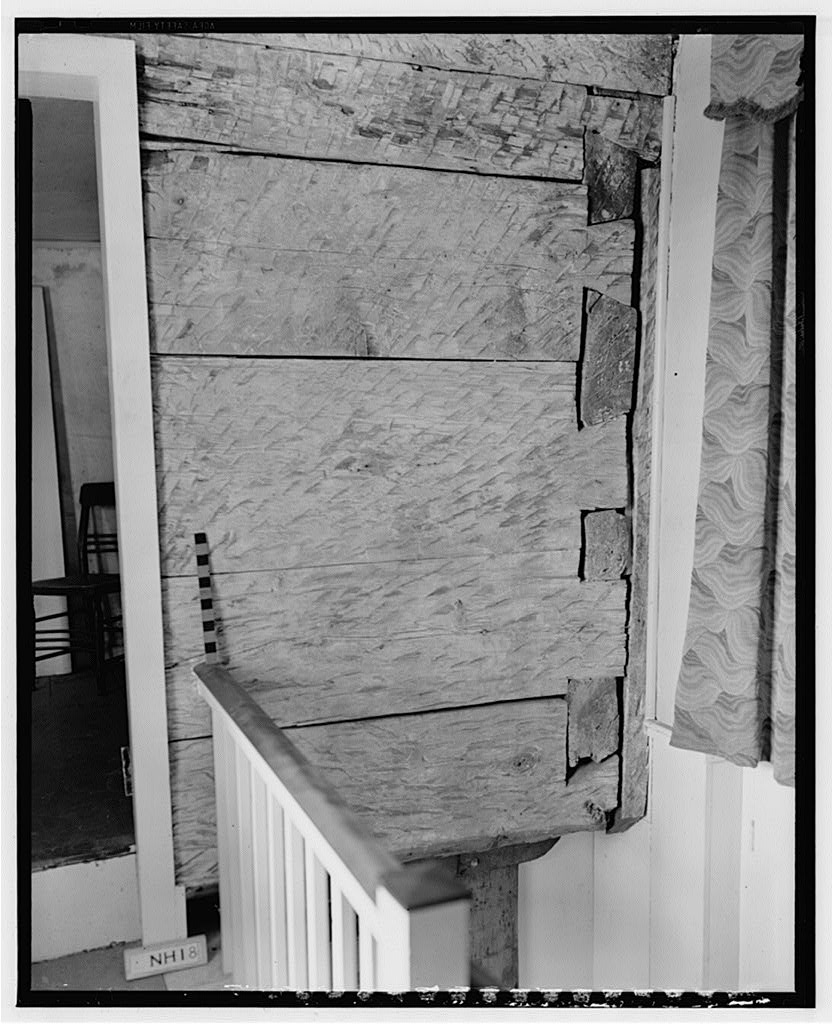
Second story interior view of Gilman Garrison House showing original squared logs of the original garrison house

The Gilman Garrison House stands near the eastern end of Exeter's historic waterfront commercial district, on the south side of Water Street at its junction with Clifford Street. It is a 2 1/2-story T-shaped structure, with a gabled roof and clapboarded exterior. The oldest portion has a frame of oak timbers, with heaving wooden planking forming its walls. The upper floor projects over the ground floor and there are also wall structures indicative that part of the house could be isolated by means of a wooden portcullis. Despite its unusual architectural features, there is no evidence that the house was built as a garrison or that it was ever attacked.

== History ==
The Gilman family, proprietors of sawmills and a prominent early Exeter family involved in shipping, built the log house in 1709. It was owned late in the 18th century by Ebenezer Clifford, a master carpenter of renown throughout New Hampshire's Seacoast region, who took on Daniel Webster as a tenant while the latter attended Phillips Exeter Academy. In the 20th century, it underwent restoration and was converted into a museum of Americana, which also showcased some of the building's distinctive features. It was acquired by the Society for the Preservation of New England Antiquities (SPNEA, now Historic New England) in 1966. The house was added to the National Register of Historic Places in 1976. In 2005 dendrochronology testing was conducted on the house, which confirmed a tree felling date of 1709.

== See also ==
- Ladd-Gilman House
- Nicholas Gilman
- John Taylor Gilman
- List of the oldest buildings in New Hampshire
- National Register of Historic Places listings in Rockingham County, New Hampshire
