= Front Street Historic District (Exeter, New Hampshire) =

Historic district in New Hampshire, United States

- U.S. National Register of Historic Places
- U.S. Historic district
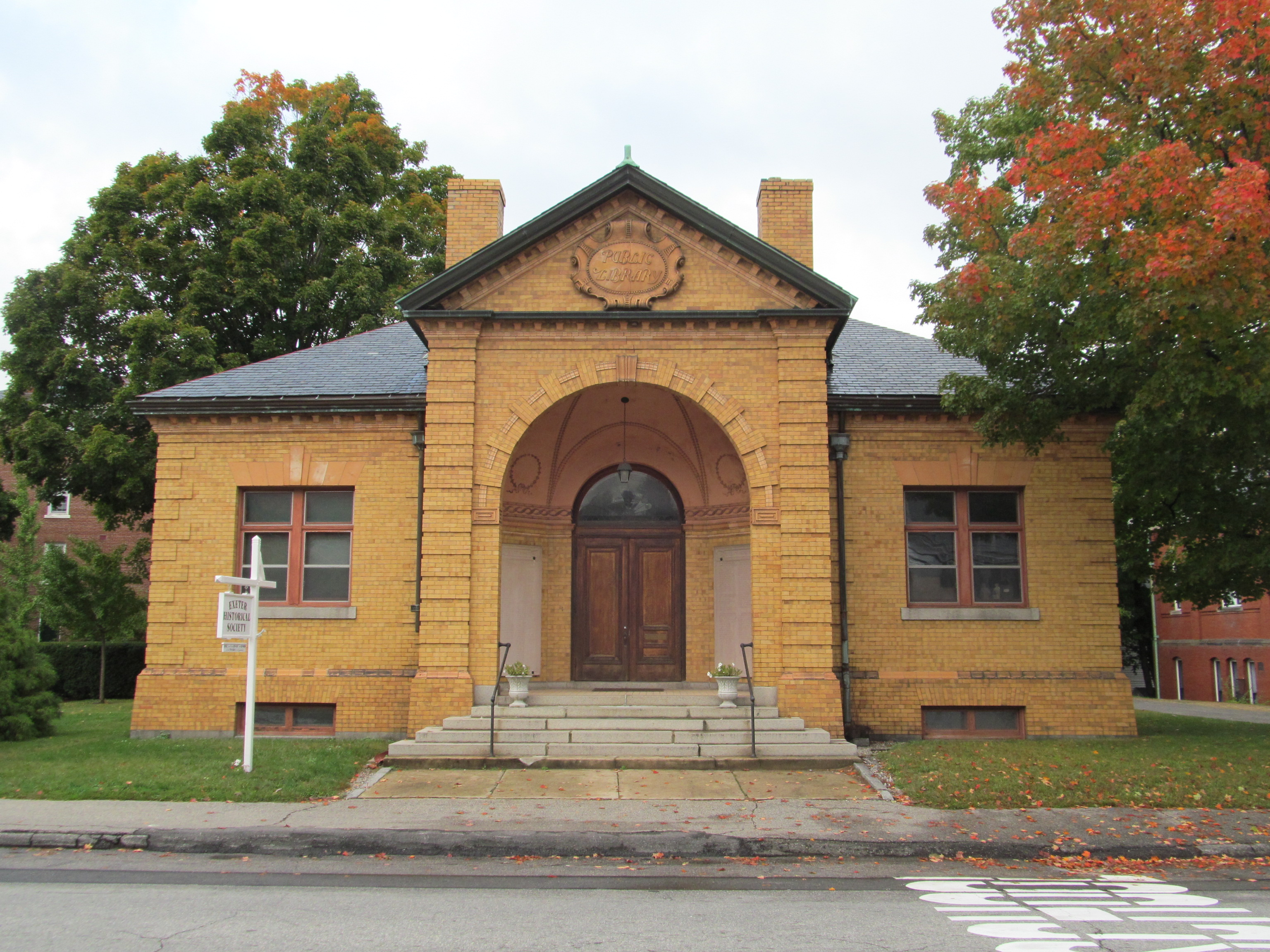
- Former Public Library

- Location within New Hampshire Location within the United States
- Location: Front St. to the jct. of Spring and Water Sts., Exeter, New Hampshire
- Coordinates: 42°58′45″N 70°57′4″W
- Area: 45 acres (18 ha)
- Architect: Multiple
- Architectural style: Greek Revival, Federal
- NRHP reference No.: 73000270
- Added to NRHP: July 5, 1973

The Front Street Historic District in Exeter, New Hampshire, encompasses a portion of the town's historic center. The district extends from Swasey Pavilion, at the junction of Front and Water streets, southwesterly along Front Street to Gale Park, about five blocks. Front Street is one of Exeter's oldest roads, and is lined with a series of 18th and 19th-century civic, religious, and residential structures, many of which are well preserved. The district was listed on the National Register of Historic Places (NRHP) in 1973.

== Description and history ==
Exeter was founded in 1638 by Rev. John Wheelwright and his followers, who had been banished from the Massachusetts Bay Colony to the south over religious differences. Its location on the Squamscott River soon developed as a shipbuilding and lumber shipment center, with the community center on the south bank. Front Street, now designated New Hampshire Route 111, developed as a major westbound road. It was where the campus of Phillips Exeter Academy was established in 1783, and the lower portion of Front Street near its junction with the commercial Water Street area is where its civic center developed. Between the academy and the civic center is where The Congregational Church in Exeter was built in 1798, along with a cluster of mainly early 19th-century residences. West of the academy campus residential development continued with slightly wider spacing, becoming more rural after passing Gale Park, a triangular park at the junction of Front and Linden streets.

The historic district covers about 45 acres (18 ha) of central Exeter to the southwest of its commercial waterfront district. It extends for about five blocks along Front Street, from the pavilion near the junction of Front and Water streets, to Gale Park. It also includes a few densely-built blocks between the Phillips Exeter campus and Water Street, an area that includes the Ladd-Gilman House, a National Historic Landmark that is now a history museum. Architecturally prominent buildings include the Dudley House on the south side of Front Street, which is a fine Federal style house, and the Moses-Kent House at its far western end, which is a good example of Second Empire architecture.

== See also ==
- National Register of Historic Places listings in Rockingham County, New Hampshire
