= Dudley House (Exeter, New Hampshire) =

Historic house in New Hampshire, United States

- U.S. National Register of Historic Places
- U.S. Historic district – Contributing property
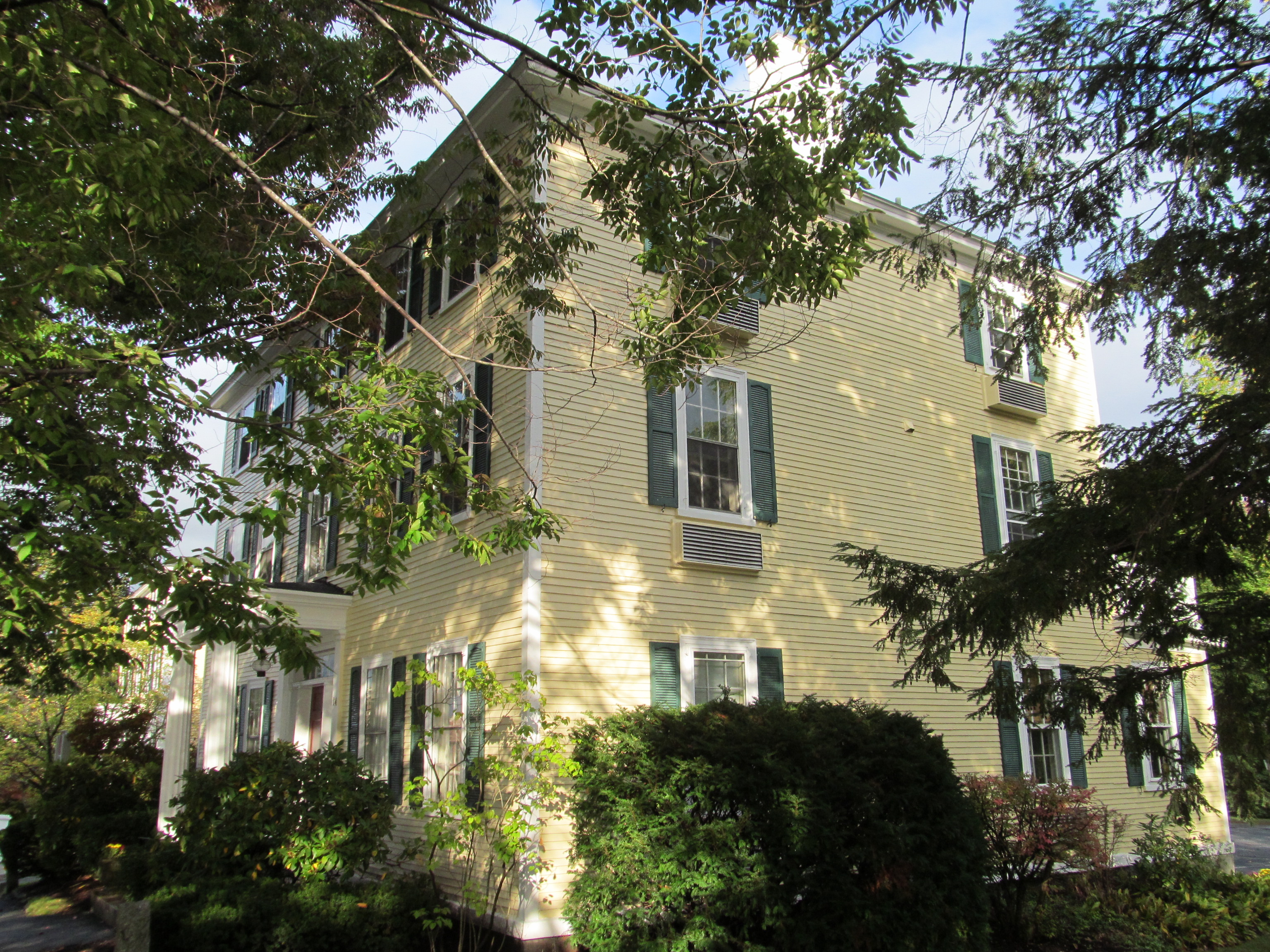

- Location within New Hampshire Location within the United States
- Location: 14 Front St., Exeter, New Hampshire
- Coordinates: 42°58′49″N 70°56′49″W
- Area: 0.5 acres (0.20 ha)
- Built: 1802
- Architectural style: Federal
- Part of: Front Street Historic District (ID73000270)
- NRHP reference No.: 71000051

Significant dates
- Added to NRHP: June 21, 1971
- Designated CP: July 5, 1973

The Dudley House, also known as the Perry-Dudley House, is a historic house at 14 Front Street in Exeter, New Hampshire. Built about 1805, it is a prominent local example of Federal architecture, further notable for its occupation by two of the town's leading 19th-century doctors. The house was listed on the National Register of Historic Places in 1971. It now houses professional offices.

== Description and history ==
The Dudley House occupies a prominent position on the east side of Front Street in downtown Exeter, nearly across the street from both the Congregational Church and Exeter Town Hall. It is a three-story wood-frame structure, with a hip roof and two interior brick chimneys. The main facade is five bays wide, with a center entrance sheltered by a gabled portico supported by two columns. The entrance is flanked by sidelight windows and fluted pilasters, and is topped by a transom window. The interior follows a center hall plan, although the main stair ascends from the back rather than the front. Later 19th-century additions include an ell and an attached carriage barn.

The house was built sometime between about 1805 and 1813, and is one of Exeter's finest examples of Federal architecture. It was built for Dr. William Perry, who was for many years a leading physician of the town. He was succeeded in this role by his son, William Gilman Perry. During the latter's ownership, they probably hosted writer Sarah Orne Jewett, a family friend. Perry's daughter married Albertus Dudley, descendant of Rev. Samuel Dudley, one of the town's 17th-century ministers. The house remained in the hands of Dudley descendants until 1935.

== See also ==
- National Register of Historic Places listings in Rockingham County, New Hampshire
