= Ladd-Gilman House =

United States historic place

- U.S. National Register of Historic Places
- U.S. National Historic Landmark
- U.S. Historic district – Contributing property
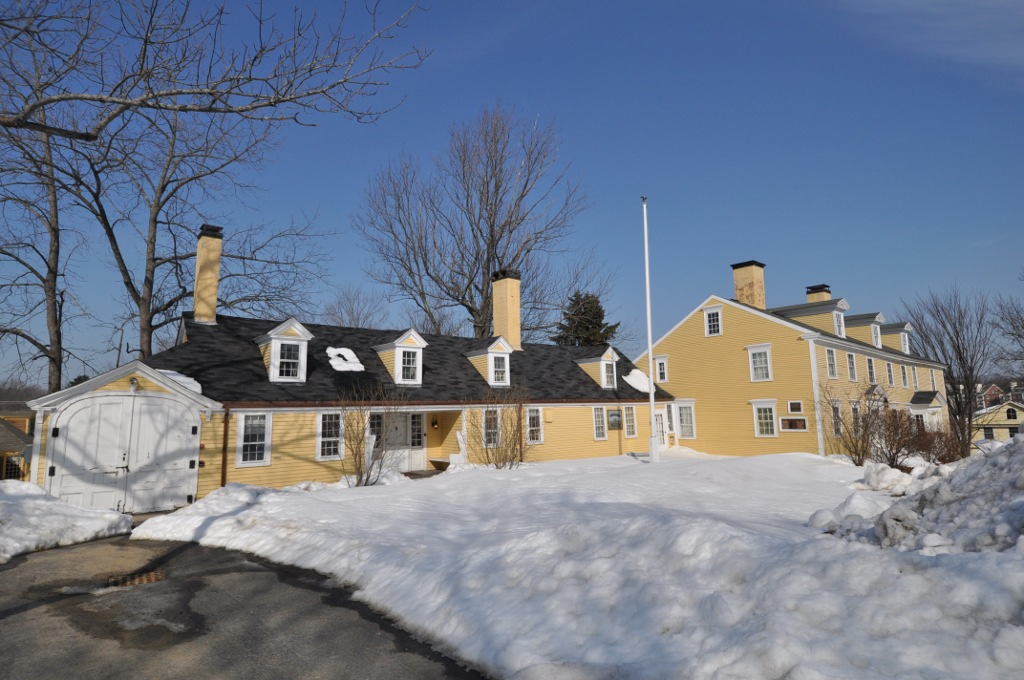

- Location within New Hampshire Location within the United States
- Location: 1 Governors Lane, Exeter, New Hampshire
- Coordinates: 42°58′54″N 70°56′57″W
- Built: 1721
- Architect: Nathaniel Ladd
- Part of: Front Street Historic District (ID73000270)
- NRHP reference No.: 74002055

Significant dates
- Added to NRHP: December 2, 1974
- Designated NHL: December 2, 1974
- Designated CP: July 5, 1973

The Ladd-Gilman House, also known as Cincinnati Memorial Hall, is a historic house at 1 Governors Lane in Exeter, New Hampshire, United States. It is listed on the National Register of Historic Places and is designated a National Historic Landmark.

== History ==
The home was built about 1721 by Nathaniel Ladd as one of the state's first brick houses, and was subsequently clapboarded three decades later. The home was purchased in 1747 by Daniel Gilman, a prominent Exeter merchant. It served as the state treasury during the American Revolutionary War when two members of the Gilman family, Col. Nicholas Gilman, and his son John Taylor Gilman, later the state's governor, served as treasurers of the state. Also born in the house was Founding Father Nicholas Gilman, Jr., a signer of the United States Constitution and U.S. senator from New Hampshire.

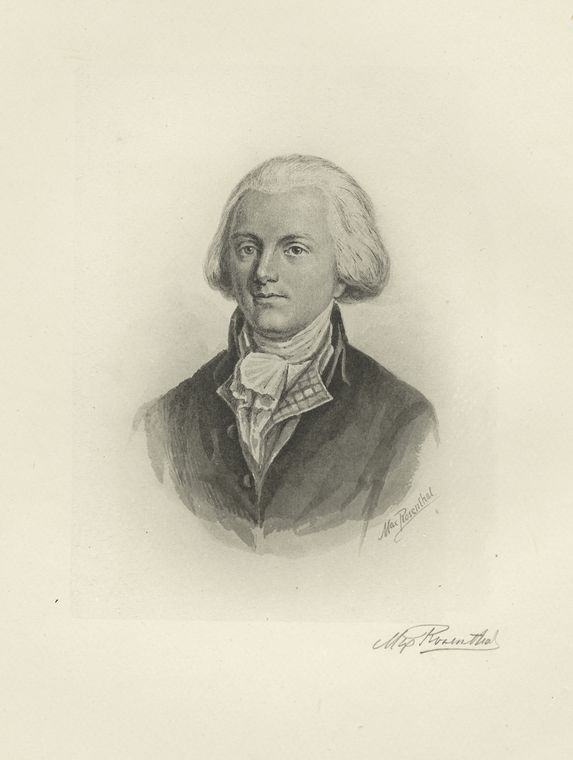
Nicholas Gilman, Jr., signer of the U.S. Constitution, born at Ladd-Gilman House

The Ladd-Gilman House was declared a National Historic Landmark in 1973, principally for its association with Nicholas Gilman, Jr. It has been maintained since 1902 by the Society of the Cincinnati, in which organization the Gilman family took a prominent role.

In 1985, a Dunlap Broadside was discovered in the home's attic. The document is one of the first published copies of the Declaration of Independence, printed on the night of July 4, 1776. The Ladd-Gilman House and its grounds are now part of the American Independence Museum, which opened in 1991. The noted Dunlap Broadside is the centerpiece of the museum’s collection.

== Description and construction history ==
The house is a rambling frame structure, consisting of a main block and a series of additions. The main block was originally built as a two-story brick structure. After Daniel Gilman purchased the house in 1747, it was extensively altered by Col. Nathaniel Gilman, his son. He removed the wall separating the two rooms on the right side, and built the two-bay addition beside it, knocking down the original house wall on that side, and then clapboarding the rest of the house to match the new work. A further addition, originally designed as a caretaker's residence, was added after the Society of the Cincinnati acquired the house in 1902. The interior portions of the main house feature original woodwork, including paneling, deep window seats, and fluted pilasters.

== See also ==
- Gilman Garrison House
- List of National Historic Landmarks in New Hampshire
- National Register of Historic Places listings in Rockingham County, New Hampshire
- New Hampshire Historical Marker No. 161: Ladd-Gilman House
