= Max Rosenthal =

American artist (1833–1918)

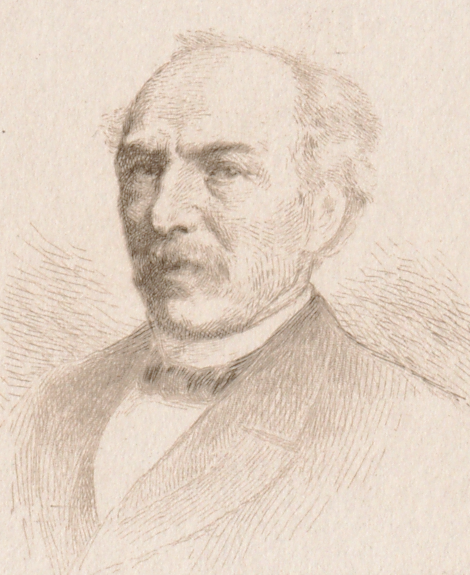
- Self-Portrait (1903)
- Born: November 23, 1833; Turek, Congress Poland
- Died: August 8, 1918 (aged 84); Philadelphia, Pennsylvania, U.S.
- Known for: Portraits and etchings
- Spouse: Carolina
- Children: 3, including Albert

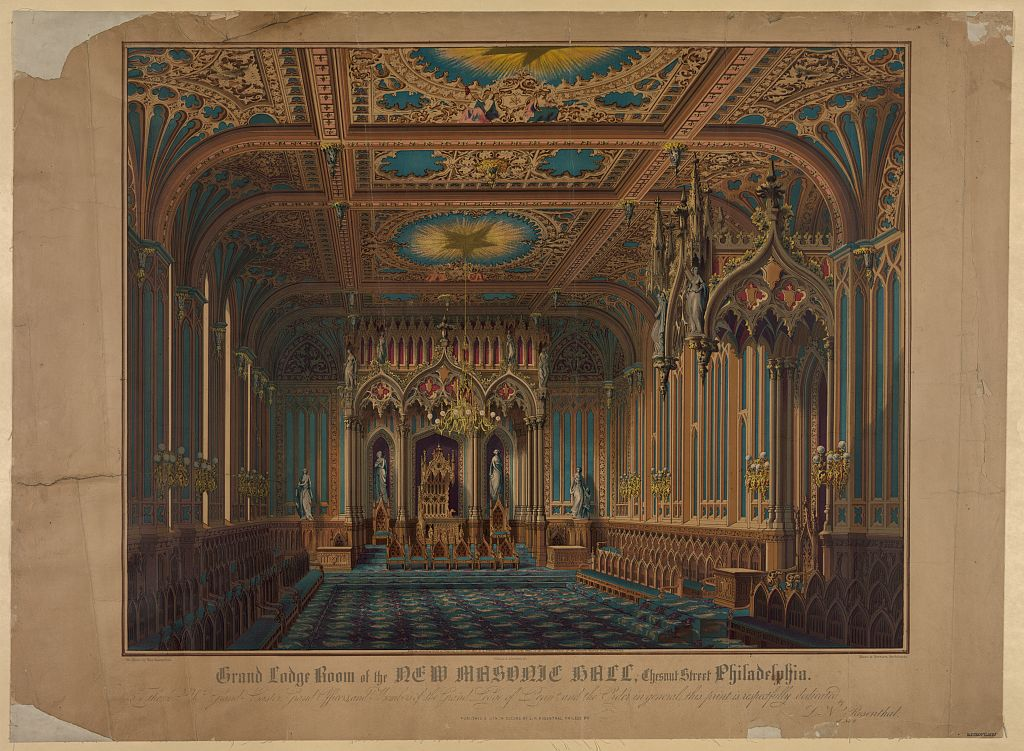
Interior of the old Masonic Temple (demolished) of Philadelphia, drawn and chromolithographed by Max Rosenthal (1854)

Max Rosenthal (November 23, 1833 – August 8, 1918) was a Polish-American painter, lithographer, draftsman and etcher.

== Early life ==
Max Rosenthal was born on November 23, 1833, in Turek, Congress Poland to Jewish parents Esther Kolsky and Wolf Rosenthal. He studied in Berlin under Professor Carl Harnisch. In 1847 he went to Paris, where he studied lithography, drawing, and painting with Martin Thurwanger, with whom he came to Philadelphia in 1849, and completed his studies.

== Career ==
Rosenthal made the chromolithographic plates for what is believed to be the first fully illustrated book by this process in the United States, "Wild Scenes and Wild Hunters." In 1854 he drew and lithographed an interior view of the old Masonic temple in Philadelphia, the plate being 22 by 25 inches, the largest chromolithograph that had been made in the country up to that time. He developed the first facsimile of water colors reproduced using the lithographic process in 1858. He also invented a process of decorating glass using sand blasting in 1872.

He designed and executed the illustrations for various works, and during the Civil War followed the Army of the Potomac, and drew every camp, up to the Battle of Gettysburg. He made illustrations for the U.S. Military Commission. These drawings he reproduced at the time. Up to 1884 he did miscellaneous works, including about 200 lithographs of distinguished Americans.

After 1884 he turned his attention to etching, and executed over 150 portraits of eminent Americans and British officers, together with numerous large plates, among which are:

- "Storm Approaches," after the painting by Henry Mosler
- illustrations for several of Longfellow's poems
- "Doris, the Shepherd's Maiden"
- "Marguerite"

He also painted, including a version of Longfellow's Building of the Ship, Legend of Rabbi Ben Levi and Jesus at Prayer.

He was the founder of the Pennsylvania Academy of Fine Arts, and one of the founders of the Sketch Club.

== Personal life ==
Rosenthal married Carolina. Together, they had two sons and one daughter. One of his sons, Albert Rosenthal, was also a lithographer and etcher.

== Death ==
Rosenthal died on August 8, 1918, at his home in Philadelphia.

== Awards ==
In 1854, Rosenthal received a silver medal in Applied Science in the Graphic Arts from the Franklin Institute relating to his work with chromolithography.

Prior to his death, he received a fellowship in the Royal Academy of Arts.
