= The Congregational Church in Exeter =

Historic church in New Hampshire, United States

- U.S. National Register of Historic Places
- U.S. Historic district – Contributing property
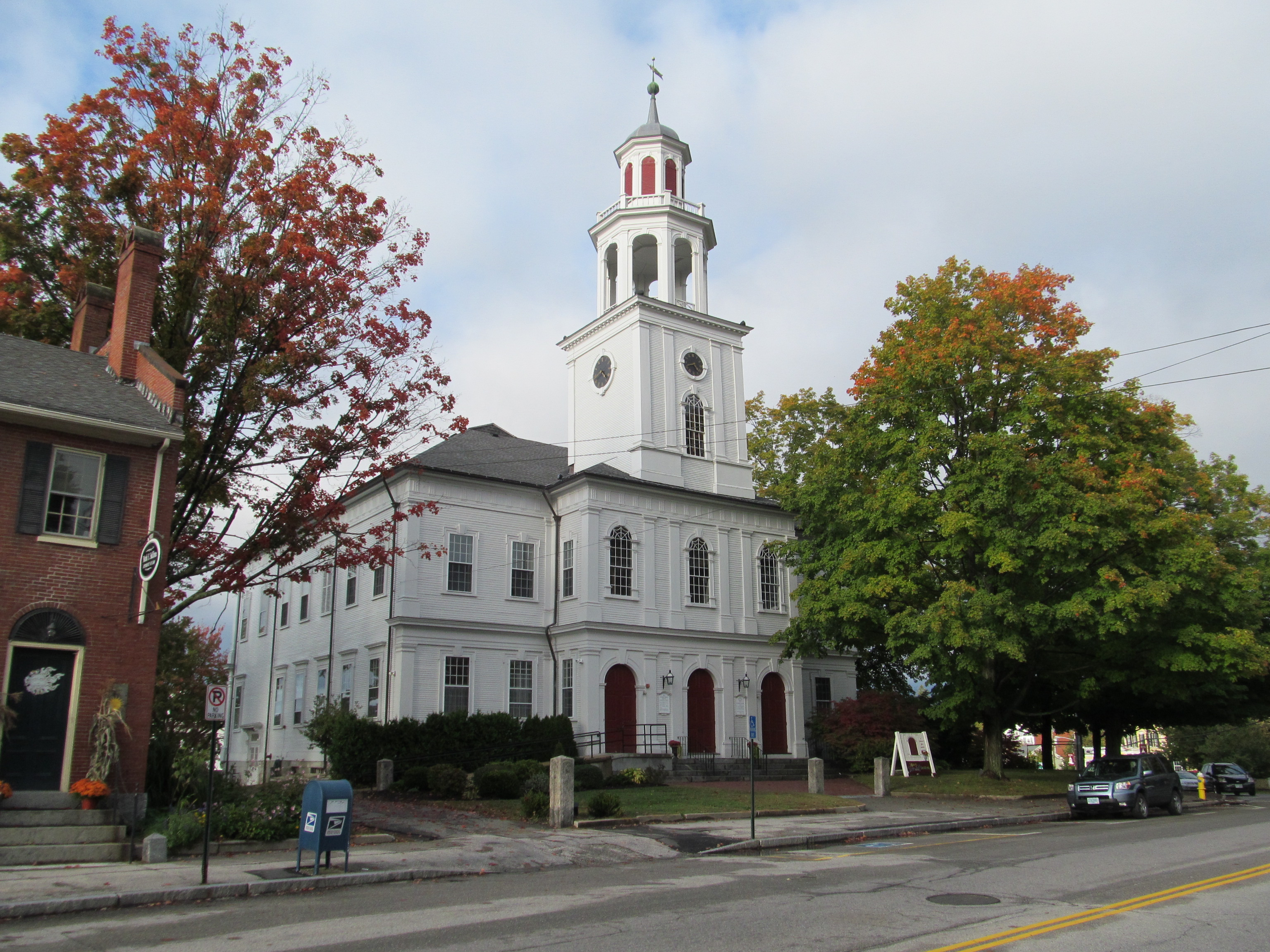
- The Congregational Church in Exeter, UCC

- Location within New Hampshire Location within the United States
- Location: 21 Front St., Exeter, New Hampshire, United States
- Coordinates: 42°58′50″N 70°56′51″W
- Built: 1798
- Architect: Clifford, Ebenezer; Johnson, Bradbury
- Part of: Front Street Historic District (ID73000270)
- NRHP reference No.: 71000052

Significant dates
- Added to NRHP: September 10, 1971
- Designated CP: July 5, 1973

The Congregational Church in Exeter is a parish of the United Church of Christ located on Front Street in Exeter, New Hampshire.

The congregation was first gathered in 1638 by the Rev. John Wheelwright following his expulsion from the Massachusetts Bay Colony.

The current congregation is a merger of the former First Parish and Second Parish of Exeter. Second Parish split from First Parish in the 1700s during the Great Awakening over theological differences. The two congregations then reunited in 1920.

Nicholas Gilman, a signer of the Declaration of Independence, was a member of the church. During the schism of the two congregations, Phillips Exeter Academy was founded by John Phillips and other members of the Second Parish. The current Phillips Exeter Academy chapel now occupies the building of the former Second Parish. Church member Amos Tuck was keenly involved in early efforts to address the abolition of slavery, and held meetings on the subject at the church.

Today, the church has an active membership, a Sunday School, and various mission and outreach programs. The current Senior Pastor is author and minister the Rev. Dr. E. Carrington Heath. The congregation is a member of the United Church of Christ. It has been an Open and Affirming (actively welcoming LGBTQ people) congregation since 1996. They are also partnered with a church in Pfizda, Zimbabwe, and work to help prepare housing for refugees settling in New Hampshire, and give to a number of local non-profits.

The current building, located at 21 Front Street in Exeter, New Hampshire, was built in 1798 and can seat 400 people. It is the fifth meeting house built by the congregation, and was designed by Ebenezer Clifford, a local builder. The building has a number of distinctive features. Its hip roof is believed to be the earliest such roof built on a church in the state, and its only entrances were through the projecting entrance bay (unlike earlier traditional meeting houses, which had entrances on three sides). In 1838 the interior of the building was remodeled, removing box pews, and converting the gallery to a full second floor. The sanctuary is now located on the upper level, with meeting rooms and other facilities below. An addition was made to the rear of the church in 1930, giving it a more square footprint.

The building was listed on the National Register of Historic Places in 1971 as The Congregational Church (United Church of Christ) and alternately The First Church. It is included in the Front Street Historic District. Notable items inside the church include the pew in which Abraham Lincoln sat when he came to visit his son at the nearby Phillips Exeter Academy, a portrait of Lincoln, and a portrait of the Rev. Wheelwright. The church sanctuary organ is an Aeolian-Skinner with three manuals and 20 ranks of pipes, dedicated in 1951. There is a small, working memorial garden at the side of the church, in which are also buried town fathers Folsom and Gilman.

In literature, the church building figures in John Irving's 1989 novel A Prayer for Owen Meany. Irving grew up in the congregation.

== See also ==
- National Register of Historic Places listings in Rockingham County, New Hampshire
