= American Independence Museum =

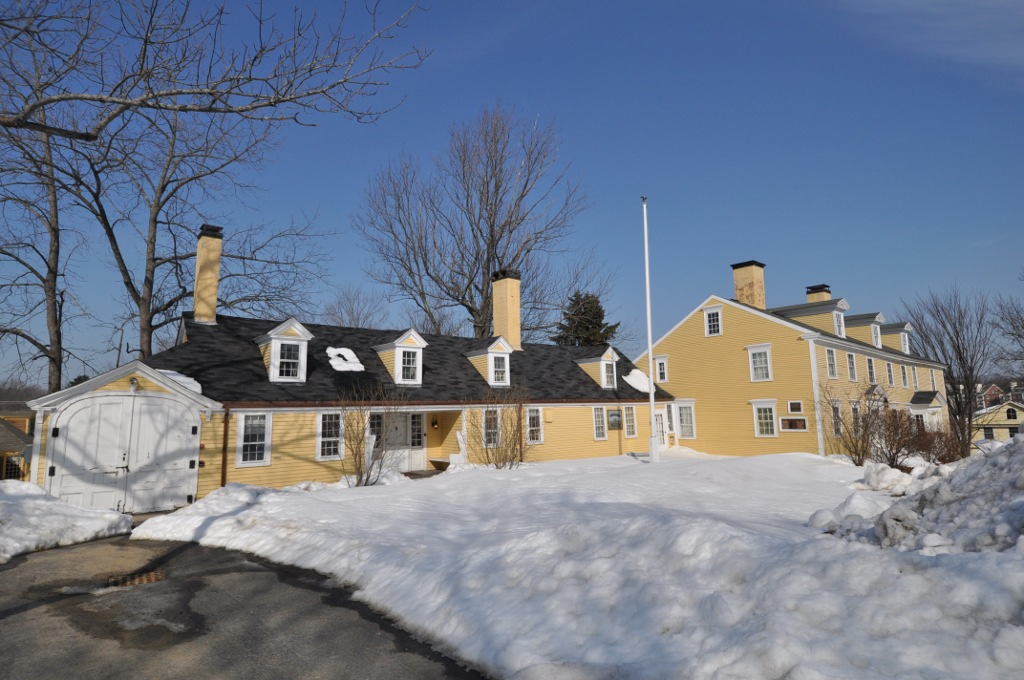
- Ladd-Gilman House, main building of the American Independence Museum
- Established: 1991
- Location: One Governor's Lane; Exeter, New Hampshire
- Coordinates: 42°58′54″N 70°56′57″W
- Type: History museum
- Public transit access: Exeter Station 0.6 miles (0.97 km)
- Parking: Spring and Water streets (no charge)
- Website: www.independencemuseum.org

The American Independence Museum is a historic house museum located in Exeter, New Hampshire. Its 1-acre (0.40 ha) campus includes two buildings: the Ladd-Gilman House, a registered National Historic Landmark built in 1721 by Nathaniel Ladd, and the Folsom Tavern, listed on the New Hampshire State Register of Historic Places and built in 1775 by Colonel Samuel Folsom. The museum was opened in 1991 after a rare copy of the Declaration of Independence known as a Dunlap Broadside was found in the Ladd-Gilman house, 200 years after its arrival in Exeter. It is the centerpiece of the museum’s collection. The museum’s mission is “Connecting America’s Revolutionary past with the present.”

== History ==
The American Independence Museum opened in 1991, six years after a Dunlap Broadside was found in the attic of the Ladd-Gilman House. The Society of the Cincinnati, owners of the house, enlisted Sotheby's to explore a sale of the document, but that effort was halted when the State of New Hampshire raised questions about ownership. The Society subsequently opened the museum to educate visitors about the Declaration and the American Revolution. Since the museum’s opening, the museum has restored the Folsom Tavern, adding additional material and space to the museum. The museum now focuses on Revolutionary history and the role of Exeter and the Gilman family in the forming of the new nation.

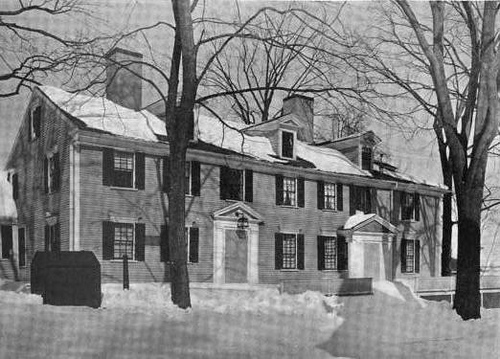
The Ladd-Gilman House, circa 1914

=== Ladd-Gilman House ===
The Ladd-Gilman House was the home of an 18th-century merchant family whose members played key roles in the birth of the United States. Nicholas Gilman, Sr. served as the New Hampshire state treasurer during the American Revolution when the capital of New Hampshire moved from Portsmouth to Exeter. Eldest son John Taylor Gilman read the Declaration of Independence to the citizens of Exeter in 1776 and later became New Hampshire governor for 14 non-consecutive terms between 1794 and 1805, and then again in 1813 to 1816. Nicholas Gilman, Jr. was a member of the Continental Army and a signer of the U.S. Constitution. In the early 20th century, the New Hampshire chapter of the Society of the Cincinnati purchased the building from the Gilman family and used the building as its meeting house, before converting the building into the museum. There are 7 rooms in the house open to the public for tours, with later additions now housing museum administration and a research library.

=== Folsom Tavern ===
Folsom Tavern
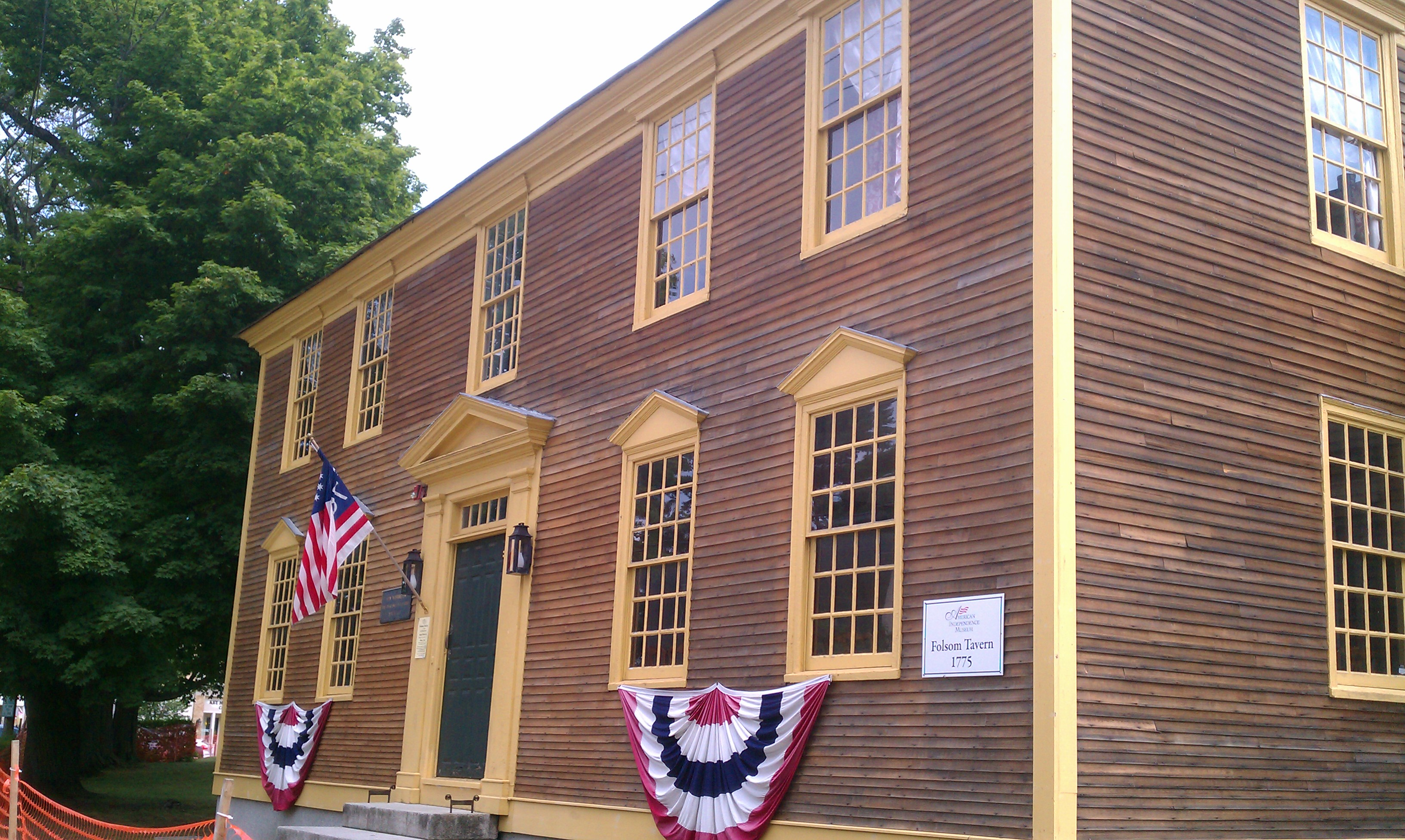
- Restored front of the Folsom Tavern, facing Water Street in downtown Exeter
- Interactive map of Folsom Tavern
- 42.98177°N 70.94962°W
- Location: 164 Water Street; Exeter, New Hampshire

History
- Built: 1775
- Built for: Colonel Samuel Folsom

NH State Register of Historic Places
- Designated: October 29, 2018

Exeter was the capital of New Hampshire when Colonel Samuel Folsom built his tavern in 1775. During the Revolutionary War, it was the site of many passionate political debates and was a popular spot with men of the town after. It was originally located on the corner of Court and Mill streets (now Front and Water streets). The New Hampshire chapter of the Society of the Cincinnati formed in the tavern in 1783. George Washington stopped at the tavern for a collation on November 4, 1789, during his tour of the states. After Col. Folsom’s death in 1790, the tavern was willed to his widow and his two daughters who continued to operate the tavern, and became known as “Widow Folsom’s Tavern”. It stayed in the Folsom family until 1856.

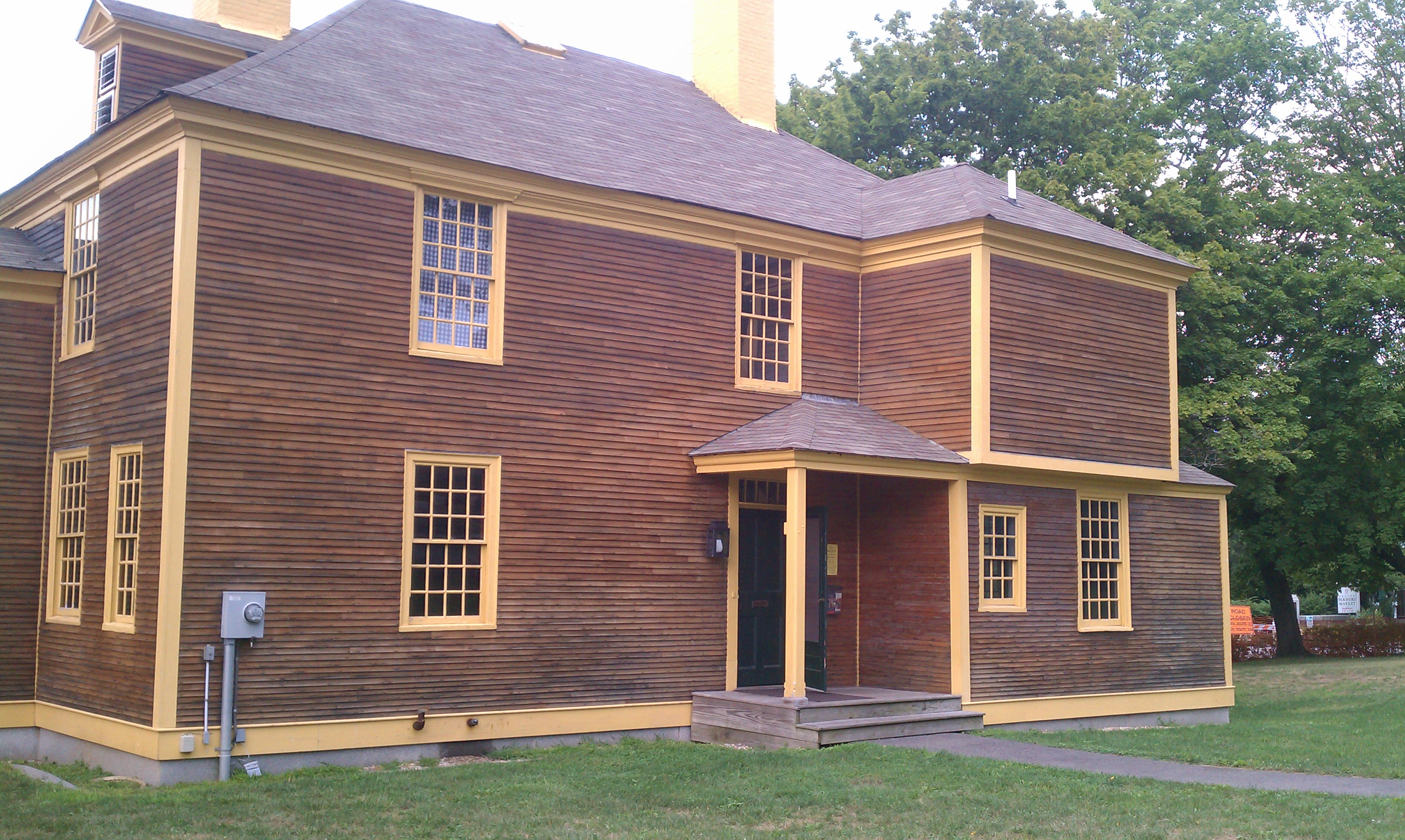
Folsom Tavern after restoration

The tavern was bought in 1929 by the Society and moved to the Ladd-Gilman house. In 1947, Martha Foster Stearns, a preservationist and Colonial Dame, proposed to restore the tavern, in exchange for a long-term residential lease. The Society agreed, and the Stearns restored and modernized much of the original tavern. The Stearns lived in the Tavern until 1956. Between 1956 and 1992, the tavern was leased out to neighboring Phillips Exeter Academy as a faculty residence.

In 2004, the tavern was moved to its current location on museum grounds, at the intersection of Spring and Water Streets. Extensive restoration on the building included the installation of a new roof and clapboards. Interior restoration began in 2006, after receiving a grant from New Hampshire's Land and Community Heritage Investment Program. The tavern opened in 2007, and is now part of the museum's regular tour. It is also used as a programming location for the museum, and is often rented out by third parties.

Folsom Tavern was added to the New Hampshire State Register of Historic Places in 2018.

== Collections ==
The museum's collection of historical artifacts includes the Dunlap Broadside, two rare draft copies of the U.S. Constitution and a Badge of Military Merit (the original Purple Heart), awarded by General George Washington to soldiers demonstrating extraordinary bravery. Some of the museum’s other collections are period furniture, decorative arts from the 18th and 19th centuries, 18th century weaponry, military ephemera, letters, documents, and portraits of American statesmen.

=== Dunlap Broadside ===
In 1985, the Broadside of the Declaration of Independence was found in the upstairs floorboards when electricians were wiring a security system for the house. This particular copy was the 23rd copy found, and now one of 26 copies known to exist. These copies of the Declaration were printed by John Dunlap, the night of July 4th. Dunlap was asked to print at least 150 and no more than 200 copies of the broadside. One was to go to each of the state capitals, military encampments, and several sent to England to inform King George III. The museum's particular broadside reached Exeter on July 16, 1776, and was read by John Taylor Gilman, the eldest son of the Gilman household, to the people of Exeter. The broadside is displayed once a year on the third Saturday of July during the museum's American Independence Festival, that commemorates the arrival of the document and the reading by John Taylor Gilman.

== Programming ==
The museum is open seasonally, May through November, Thursday through Saturday, from 10am to 4pm. Guided tours of the Ladd-Gilman House and Folsom Tavern are available at 10 am, noon and 2 pm; self-guided tours are available until 3 pm. The museum hosts a variety of public programs; the largest is the American Independence Festival, held annually during July. The Festival engages thousands of visitors in the nation's 18th century heritage.

=== American Independence Festival ===
The American Independence Festival, previously known as the Revolutionary War Festival, is an annual festival produced by the American Independence Museum. The Festival, held the 3rd Saturday in July, commemorates the original reading of the Dunlap Broadside in Exeter on July 16, 1776. The opening celebration starts with a parade of reenactors and a reading of the Declaration of Independence to festival-goers. The original Dunlap Broadside is displayed in the museum during the Festival. In addition, artisans engage visitors with traditional crafts; craft and local non-profit booths and food vendors round out the event. The event attracts thousands of visitors every year.
