= Nicholas Gilman =

American Founding Father and politician (1755–1814)

Nicholas Gilman Jr.
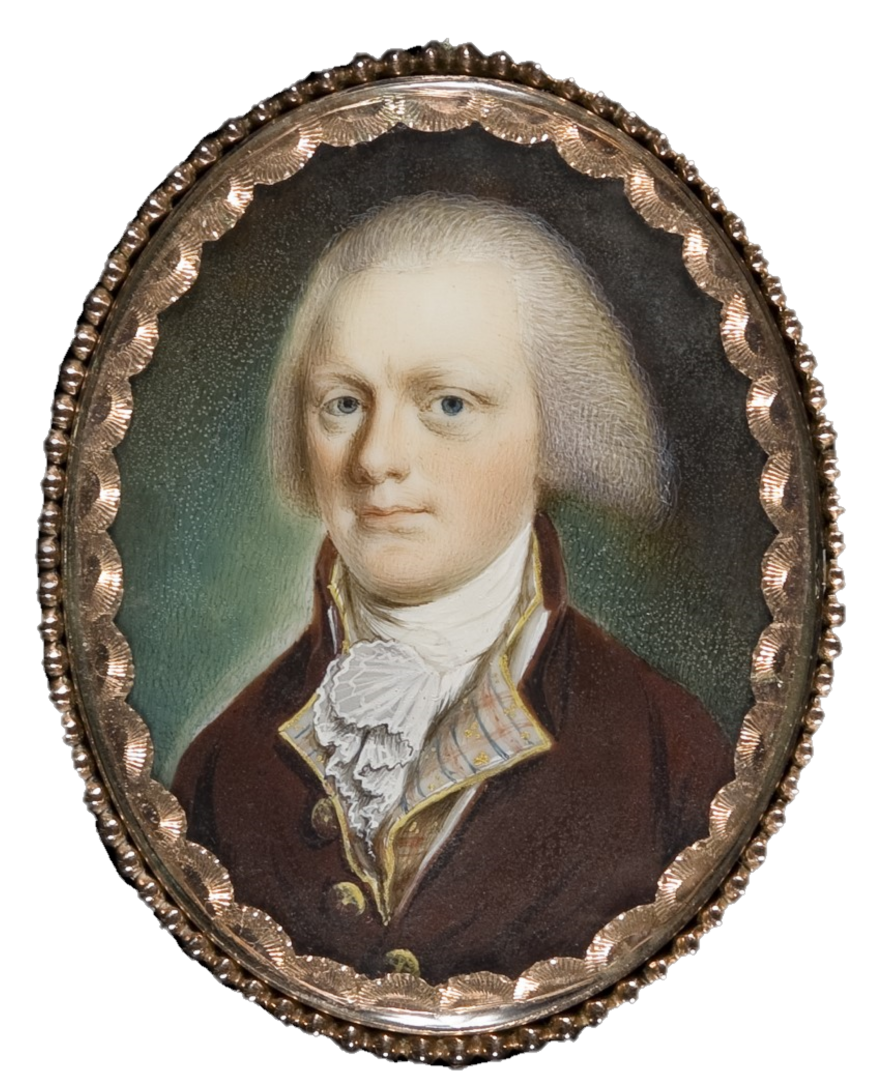
- Portrait miniature by John Ramage, 1787–1794.

United States Senator from New Hampshire
- In office March 4, 1805 – May 2, 1814
- Preceded by: Simeon Olcott
- Succeeded by: Thomas W. Thompson

Member of the U.S. House of Representatives from New Hampshire's at-large district
- In office March 4, 1789 – March 3, 1797
- Preceded by: District created
- Succeeded by: Jonathan Freeman

Personal details
- Born: August 3, 1755 Exeter, Province of New Hampshire, British America
- Died: May 2, 1814 (aged 58) Philadelphia, Pennsylvania, U.S.
- Resting place: Exeter Cemetery, Exeter
- Party: Democratic-Republican
- Occupation: merchant, state treasurer, U.S. Representative at-large, politician

Nicholas Gilman Jr. (August 3, 1755 – May 2, 1814) was an American Founding Father, a soldier in the Continental Army during the American Revolutionary War, a delegate to the Continental Congress, and a signer of the U.S. Constitution, representing New Hampshire. He was a member of the United States House of Representatives during the first four Congresses and served in the U.S. Senate from 1805 until his death in 1814. His brother John Taylor Gilman was also very active in New Hampshire politics, serving as Governor of New Hampshire for 14 years, as well as a principal benefactor of Phillips Exeter Academy. Their childhood home in Exeter is now the American Independence Museum.

== Family background and early life ==
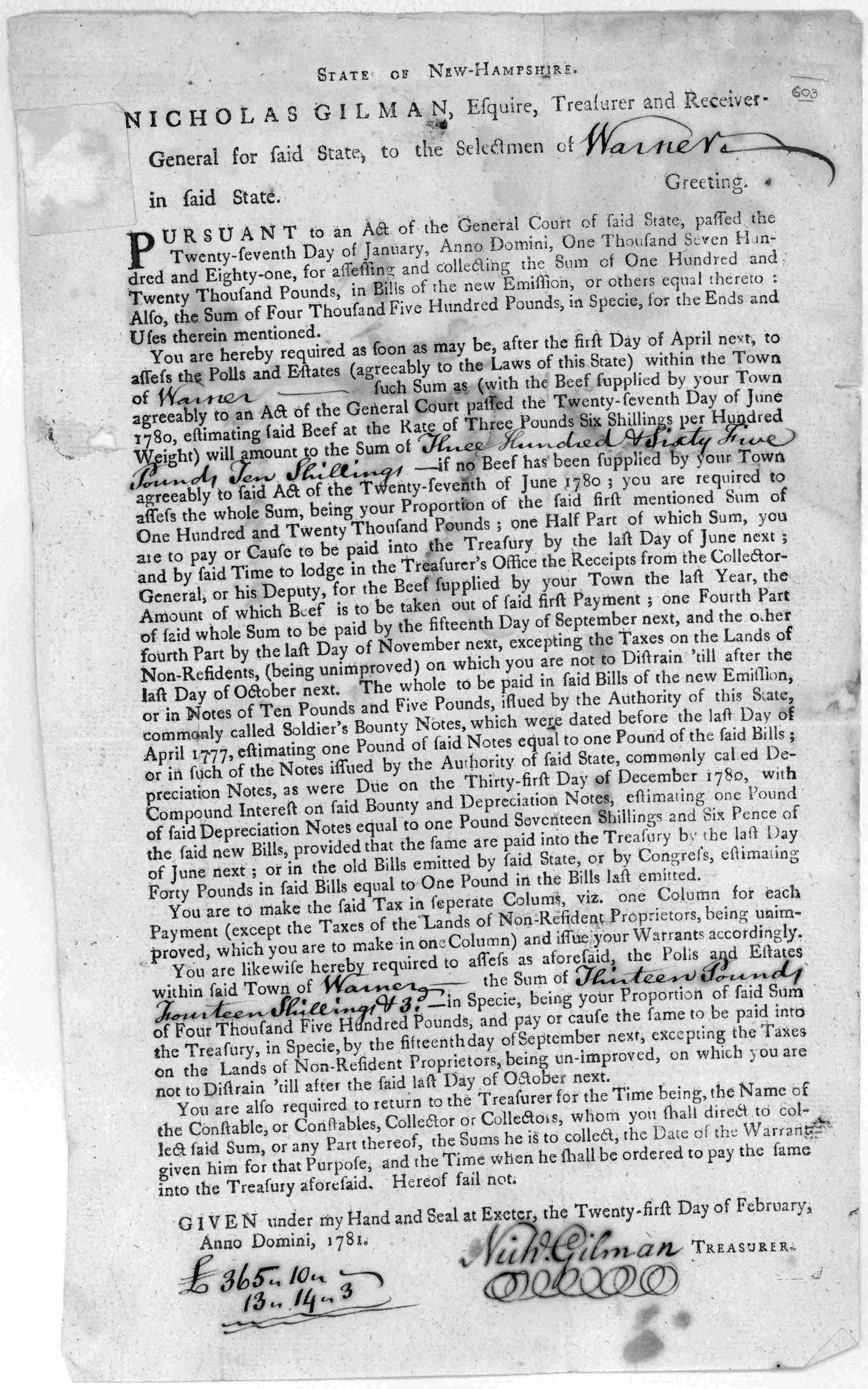
Order by Nicholas Gilman, Treasurer of New Hampshire, Exeter, 1781

Gilman was born in Exeter, Province of New Hampshire, to Ann (Taylor) and Nicholas Gilman, the second son in a family of six children. Gilman had four brothers and one sister who were named (from oldest to youngest) John, Nicholas, Nathaniel, Elizabeth, Samuel, and Daniel. He also had two brothers who died before a year of age. Born during the French and Indian War, he was soon aware of the military responsibilities that went with citizenship in a New England colony. After attending local public schools, he became a clerk in his father's trading house, but the growing rift between the colonies and Great Britain quickly thrust Gilman into the struggle for independence. New England merchants, in particular, resented Parliament's attempt to end its "salutary neglect" of the financial and political affairs of the colonies by instituting measures to raise and to enforce the raising of revenue measures that many Americans considered violations of their rights as British citizens. Gilman's father, along with Nathaniel Folsom and Enoch Poor, emerged as a leader of the Patriot cause in Exeter.

He represented his community in the New Hampshire Provincial Congresses, which met just after hostilities broke out at Lexington and Concord in 1775 and which later drafted the state constitution. During the American Revolution he served as the state's treasurer. His oldest brother, John, was a sergeant in Exeter's company of militia that marched to fight the Redcoats around Boston. Nicholas remained behind but was an ardent supporter of the Patriot cause, and he likely trained with the local militia regiment.

== Revolutionary War ==
Coat of Arms of Nicholas Gilman

In November 1776, a committee of the state legislature appointed Gilman to serve as adjutant, or administrative officer, of the 3rd New Hampshire Regiment. That unit was in the process of a complete reorganization under the direction of its commander, Colonel Alexander Scammell. Scammell used Gilman's administrative skills to organize a force from the limited manpower available, which consisted of new recruits from around the state and veterans of the Trenton Princeton campaign. In time the 3rd New Hampshire would be recognized as one of the mainstays of General George Washington's Continental Army.

Because New Hampshire lay along the major invasion route from Canada to New York, Washington assigned its regiments a key role in the strategic defense of the northern states. In the spring of 1777 Gilman and the rest of the officers and men of the 3rd New Hampshire marched to Fort Ticonderoga on Lake Champlain to participate in an attempt by American forces to halt the advance of a powerful army of British and German regulars and Indian auxiliaries under General John Burgoyne. Difficulties in coordinating the efforts of several different states turned Gilman's first military experience into one of defeat. The veteran British troops outflanked the fort, and only at the last minute did the garrison, including the 3d New Hampshire, escape capture by making a dangerous night. The American retreat lasted through the early summer until a combination of British transportation difficulties and delaying tactics employed by the Continentals finally slowed the enemy advance. This delay allowed time for a mass mobilization of New England militia, including a New Hampshire Regiment of volunteers led by John Langdon and Gilman's father. It also provided Major General Horatio Gates with time to establish new positions near Saratoga, New York, to block Burgoyne's further advance, and then, once Gates had a numerical advantage, to cut off the British line of withdrawal to Canada. During this campaign, Gilman was busily employed in supervising the training and readiness of Scammell's men. He participated with his unit in two important battles at Freeman's Farm, where Burgoyne's units were so pummeled that Burgoyne was eventually forced to surrender his whole army.

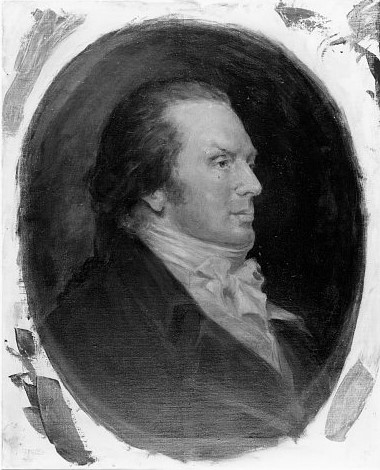
Portrait by Albert Rosenthal after Edward Greene Malbone, 1900.

Neither Gilman nor Scammell was granted a respite after this great victory. Less than a week after the British surrender, the 3rd New Hampshire set out to reinforce Washington's main army near Philadelphia. The American capital had recently fallen to a larger British force, and the New Englanders had to spend a harsh winter in the snows of Valley Forge. That winter encampment put the units of the Continental Army to their supreme test, a time of suffering and deprivation from which they emerged as a tough, professional combat team. Gilman's administrative skills came to the fore at this time. When Washington selected Colonel Scammell to serve as the Continental Army's Adjutant General, Scammell made Gilman his assistant. Promotion to the rank of captain followed in June 1778.

For the remainder of the war, Gilman found himself in close proximity to the military leaders of the Continental Army. His duties in carrying out the myriad tasks necessary to keep a force in the field placed him in daily contact with Washington, Baron von Steuben, Henry Knox, Nathanael Greene, and others. He personally saw action in the remaining battles fought by Washington's main army, including Monmouth and Yorktown, while continuing to hold his captain's commission in the New Hampshire Line. The death of Colonel Scammell, however, during the preliminary skirmishing before Yorktown robbed him of much of the joy of that great victory. Following the death of his father in late 1783, he retired from military service and returned to Exeter to assume control of the family's business.

== Statesman ==
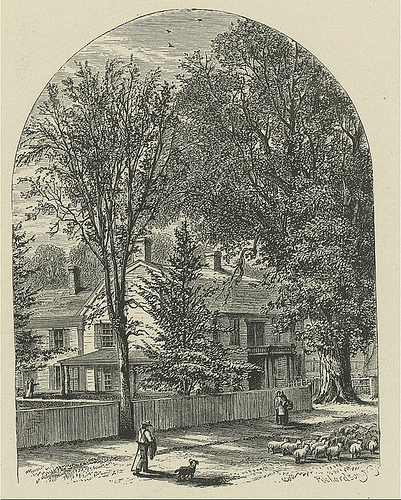
Exeter, New Hampshire, home of Hon. Nicholas Gilman

At the close of the Revolution, Gilman was elected one of the 31 original members of the Society of the Cincinnati. Gilman's career as merchant proved short-lived. His career as statesman continued for decades. Gilman's service as a Continental Army officer had exposed him to many of the ideas of such prominent nationalists as Washington and Alexander Hamilton. Their influence, his family's own tradition of service, and his special skill at organization all combined to divert the young veteran into a political career. In 1786, the New Hampshire legislature appointed Gilman to the Continental Congress. He was also selected in 1786 to represent the state at the Annapolis Convention. Although he was unable to attend, his selection recognized Gilman's emergence as a nationalist spokesman since the convention had been called specifically to address the country's serious economic problems and the inability of the separate states or Congress to solve them. He was one of two people representing New Hampshire.

The outbreak of unrest and latent insurrection in western Massachusetts in late 1786 further strengthened Gilman's commitment to changing the Articles of Confederation. That same year, he helped to suppress the Paper Money Riot. He was pleased to serve his state as a representative at the Constitutional Convention that met in July 1787. Although he and fellow New Hampshire delegate John Langdon, his father's former commanding officer, reached Philadelphia after the proceedings were well under way, they both immediately joined in the debates and helped hammer out the compromises needed to produce a document that might win approval in every state and region.

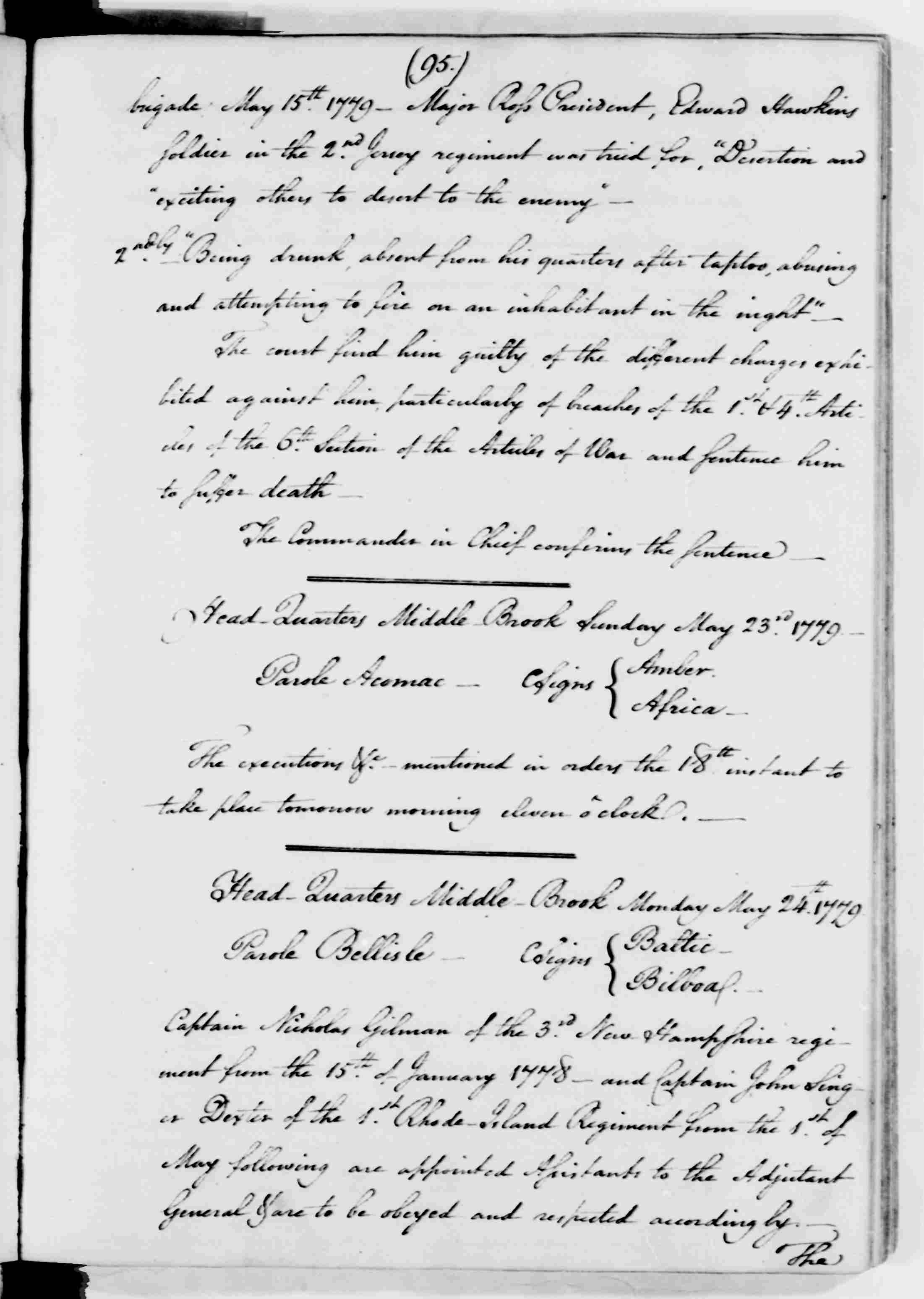
General orders of George Washington: the bottom section (May 24, 1779) names Captain Nicholas Gilman, of the Third New Hampshire Regiment as assistant to the adjutant general

During the subsequent struggle to secure New Hampshire's ratification of the Constitution, Gilman remained in New York as a member of the Continental Congress, but he kept in close touch with his brother, John, who was one of the leaders of the states ratification forces. Working in tandem, the brothers used all of their considerable political influence to engineer a 57–47 victory in the final vote.

When the First Congress of the new United States of America convened in New York in 1789, Gilman was in attendance as a member of the House of Representatives, a seat he filled for four terms. During this period the Gilman brothers came to prominence in New Hampshire politics. John became governor, a post he held for fourteen terms, while Nicholas embarked on a career in the state legislature. After returning to Exeter, Nicholas resumed his own political career in 1800, serving a term as state senator.

During this time, Gilman's political loyalties began to change. Ever a staunch nationalist, he had supported the Federalists while that party led the fight for a more binding union of the states. However, once that concept was firmly established, Gilman became increasingly concerned with the need to protect the common man from abuses of power by government. As a consequence, he gave his support to the Democratic-Republican Party that was beginning to form around Thomas Jefferson. In 1801, he accepted the appointment from Jefferson as a federal bankruptcy commissioner. Following one unsuccessful attempt for the Senate in 1802, he was then elected to the United States Senate in 1804 as a Jeffersonian. On June 17, 1812, he voted against the war against Britain, but the Senate voted 19 to 13 for the war. Although Gillman rarely spoke at length in legislative debate, his peers recognized his political prowess. He remained an influential member of the Senate until his death in 1814 while he was returning home from Washington during a recess.

Gilman summarized his belief in the importance of a strong national government on the day after he signed the Constitution. He called the new supreme law of the land "the best that could meet the unanimous concurrence of the States in Convention; it was done by bargain and Compromise, yet, notwithstanding its imperfections, on the adoption of it depends (in my feeble judgment) whether we shall become a respectable nation, or a people torn to pieces ... and rendered contemptible for ages." Those words typified Gillman, but his modesty failed to mask the justifiable pride he obviously felt in the accomplishment of the Founding Fathers in which Gilman had played no small part.

== See also ==
- List of members of the United States Congress who died in office (1790–1899)
- Ladd-Gilman House
- New Hampshire Historical Marker No. 161: Ladd-Gilman House

== Notes ==
U.S. House of Representatives
Preceded by Seat established	Member of the House of Representatives from New Hampshire's at-large (Seat 2) congressional district 1789–1797	Succeeded by Jonathan Freeman
U.S. Senate
Preceded by Simeon Olcott	U.S. senator (Class 2) from New Hampshire; 1805–1814; Served alongside: William Plumer, Nahum Parker, Charles Cutts	Succeeded by Thomas W. Thompson
