= Exeter Waterfront Commercial Historic District =

Historic district in New Hampshire, United States

- U.S. National Register of Historic Places
- U.S. Historic district
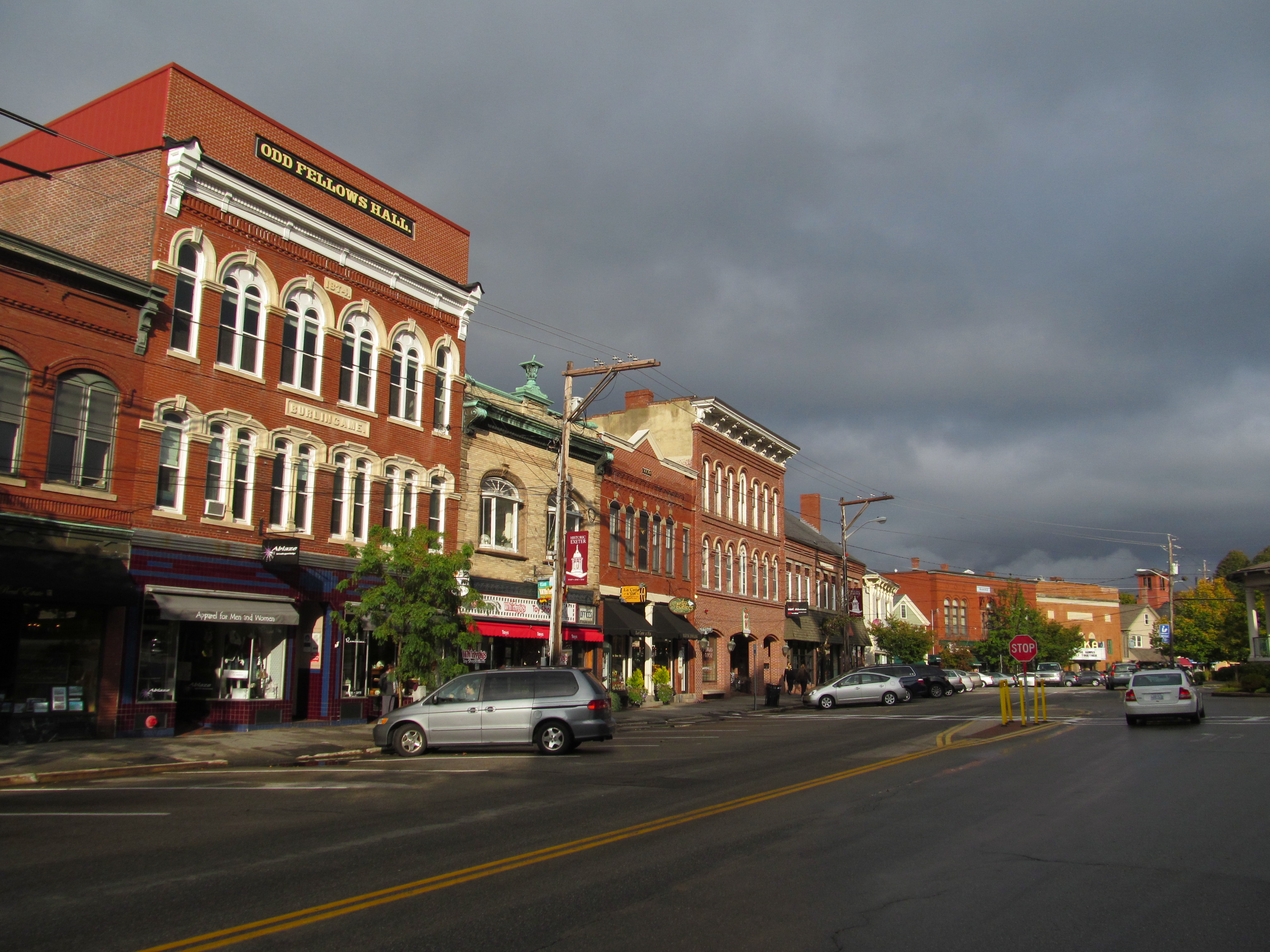

- Location within New Hampshire Location within the United States
- Location: Chestnut Hill Ave., Water, Franklin, Pleasant, High and Chestnut Sts., Exeter, New Hampshire
- Area: 28 acres (11 ha) (original size); 35 acres (14 ha) (after boundary increase)
- Architectural style: Greek Revival, Late Victorian, Federal
- NRHP reference No.: 80000299 (original); 86003516 (increase)

Significant dates
- Added to NRHP: December 3, 1980
- Boundary increase: December 29, 1986

The Exeter Waterfront Commercial Historic District encompasses the historic commercial and residential waterfront areas of Exeter, New Hampshire. The district extends along the north side of Water Street, roughly from Main Street to Front Street, and then along both sides of Water and High streets to the latter's junction with Portsmouth Street. It also includes properties on Chestnut Street on the north side of the Squamscott River. This area was where the early settlement of Exeter took place in 1638, and soon developed as a shipbuilding center. The district was listed on the National Register of Historic Places in 1980. It was enlarged in 1986 to include the mill complex of the Exeter Manufacturing Company on Chestnut Street.

== Description and history ==
Exeter was founded in 1638 by Rev. John Wheelwright and his followers, who had been banished from the Massachusetts Bay Colony to the south over religious differences. Its location on the Squamscott River soon developed as a shipbuilding and lumber shipment center, with the community center on the south bank and a primarily residential area on the north bank. Its oldest surviving structure, the Gilman Garrison House, was built c. 1700, and is one of a small number of sawn-log garrison houses to survive. It is now a museum operated by Historic New England.

In 1827 a mill complex was established on the river bank, and mill worker housing arose on the north bank, in the Pleasant Street area. After a series of fires in the mid-19th century the brick-built section of Water Street was developed, giving the downtown area much of its present character. The "upper" portion of Water and High streets, south of the fire district, has retained more of its early 19th-century character, with wood-frame residential and commercial buildings. One early surviving industrial building is the Gilman grist mill, located on Kimball Island in the river.

== See also ==
- National Register of Historic Places listings in Rockingham County, New Hampshire
