= Albert Rosenthal =

American portrait artist

- Born: January 30, 1863; Philadelphia, Pennsylvania, U.S.
- Died: December 20, 1939 (aged 76); New York City, New York, U.S.
- Education: Pennsylvania Academy of the Fine Arts; Académie Julian; École des Beaux-Arts
- Known for: Portraits and etchings
- Spouse: Henryetta Douglass Nuneville (m. 1901; div. 1930)
- Father: Max Rosenthal

Albert Rosenthal (January 30, 1863 – December 20, 1939) was an American portrait artist, printmaker, writer, and collector from Philadelphia.

== Early life ==
Albert Rosenthal was born in Philadelphia on January 30, 1863, to Max Rosenthal. He studied at Central High School for three years. His father was an engraver and lithographer and he studied under him at the Pennsylvania Academy of the Fine Arts. He studied at the Académie Julian in Paris in 1880. He also studied at École des Beaux-Arts under Jean-Léon Gérôme.

His first job was as an errand boy in the drug store owned by Charles Elmer Hires.

== Career ==
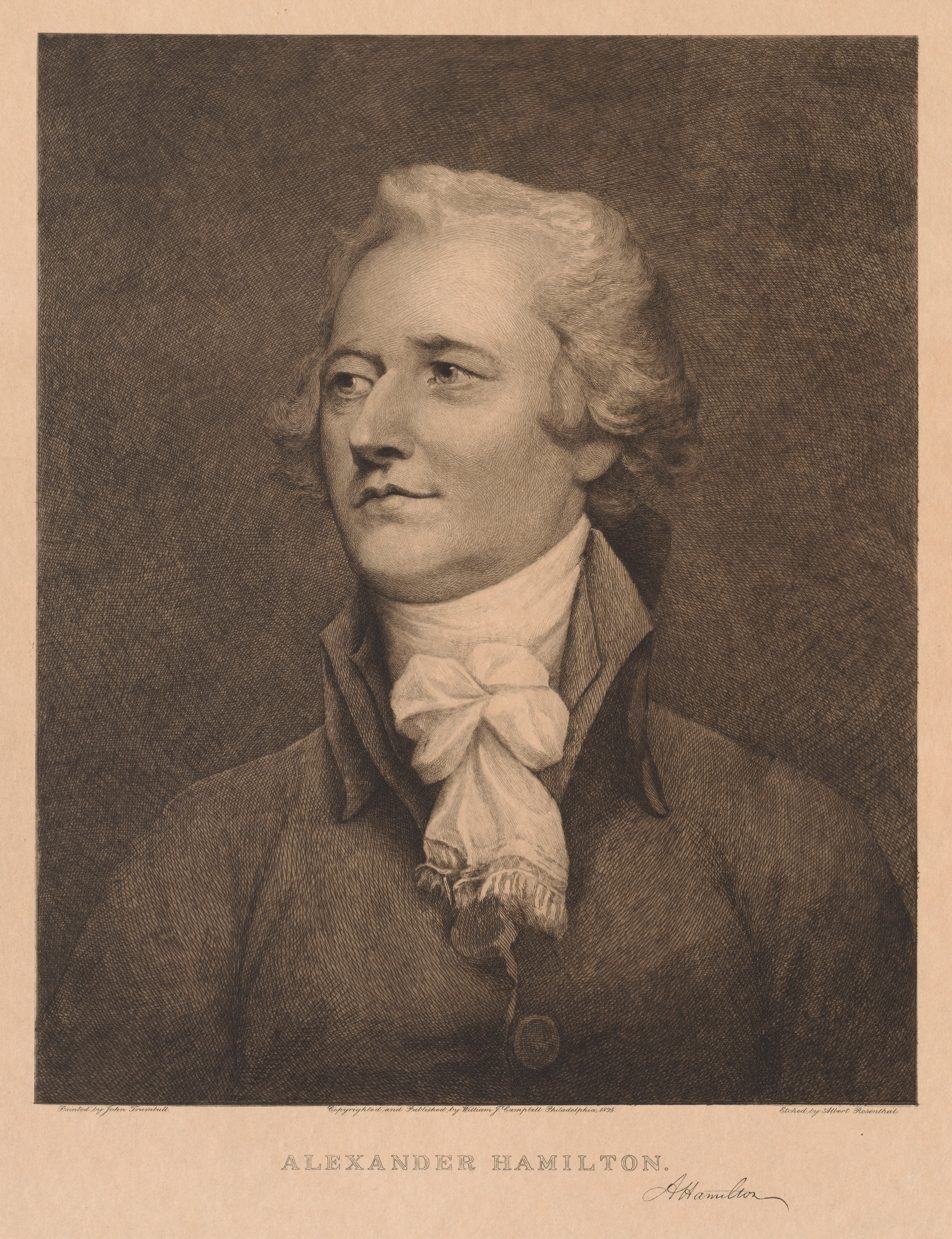
Etching of Alexander Hamilton by Albert Rosenthal, 1895

Rosenthal was known for his portraits of Supreme Court of Pennsylvania and U.S. Supreme Court justices (including Melville Fuller and Edward Douglass White), Attorneys General of the United States and his collection of American drawings. He painted likenesses of the members of the Constitutional Convention of 1787. He also copied original portraits of Americans and French in the American Revolution and the Colonial Governors of Philadelphia.

He did lithographs and etchings of Jefferson Fulton, Gilbert Stuart, Joseph Priestley, Louis Pasteur, John Paul Jones, Abraham Lincoln and Alexander Hamilton.

Rosenthal exhibited at the Society of Independent Artists in 1917 and the Salons of America. He donated his drawings to the Free Library of Philadelphia in 1927. He also donated some of his and his father's portraits to the British Museum in 1936. He moved to Bucks County, Pennsylvania in 1928.

In 1927, he was called as an art expert about the authenticity of a portrait of George Washington by John Smibert. In 1930, he was again called as an art expert about the authenticity of a portrait of Washington by Gilbert Stuart.

== Personal life ==
Rosenthal married Henryetta Douglass Nuneville in 1901. They divorced in 1930.

Rosenthal purchased the Hufnagel Mansion in 1927 near New Hope, Pennsylvania. He sold it in 1938.

== Death ==
Rosenthal died on December 20, 1939, at the home of his sister in New York City.

== Awards ==
Rosenthal received a bronze medal at the St. Louis Exposition in 1904 and a bronze medal at the Panama–Pacific International Exposition in 1915.
