= North Hampton Library =

- U.S. National Register of Historic Places
- NH State Register of Historic Places
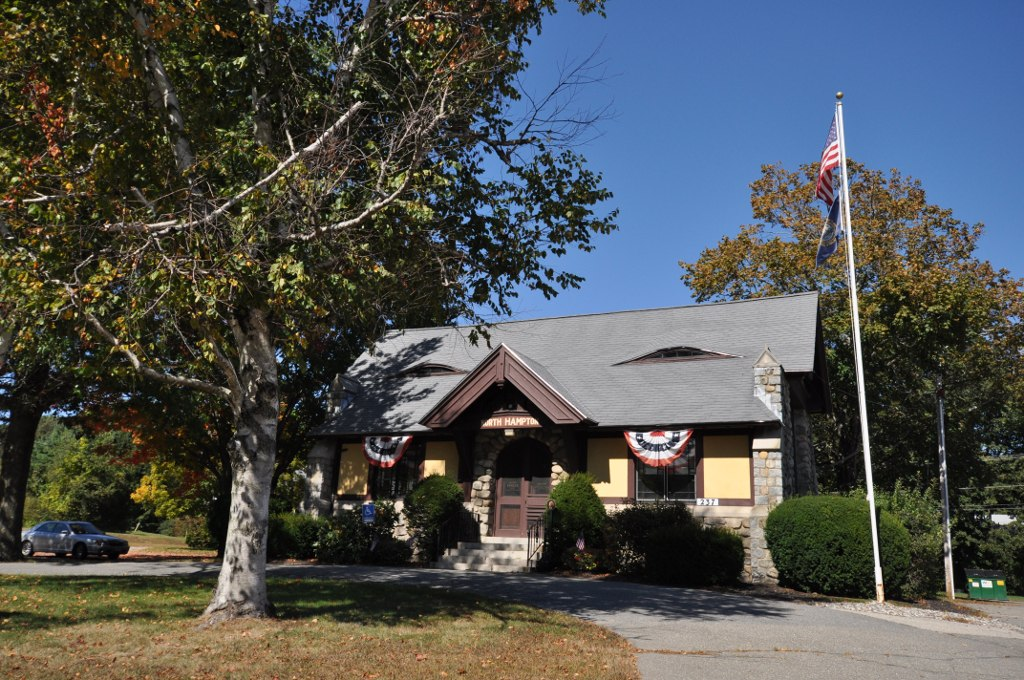

- Location within New Hampshire Location within the United States
- Location: 237 Atlantic Ave., North Hampton, New Hampshire
- Coordinates: 42°58′24″N 70°49′50″W
- Area: Less than one acre
- Built: 1907
- Architect: J. Lawrence Berry
- Architectural style: Tudor Revival
- NRHP reference No.: 13001149

Significant dates
- Added to NRHP: February 5, 2014
- Designated NHSRHP: April 29, 2013

The Old North Hampton Library is a historic library building at 237 Atlantic Avenue in North Hampton, New Hampshire. The small, single-story Tudor Revival structure was designed by Boston architect J. Lawrence Berry and built in 1907. It was the town's first purpose-built library building, and was used as such until a new library was built nearby in 1973. It presently houses town offices. The building was listed on the National Register of Historic Places in 2014, and the New Hampshire State Register of Historic Places in 2013.

== Description and history ==
The former North Hampton Library building is located in a cluster of municipal buildings on the north side of Atlantic Avenue (New Hampshire Route 111), a short way east of its junction with Lafayette Road (U.S. Route 1). It is a single-story structure, with fieldstone end walls and a side gable roof. The front facade is fieldstone (a continuation of the foundation) up to the bottoms of the windows, and is then finished in a half-timbered effect above. The main entrance is at its center, sheltered by projecting gabled portico with large timber brackets. It is flanked on the roof face by two eyebrow dormers. An addition, built in 1955, extends to the building's rear. The town's modern library is set further back on the same lot.

North Hampton's public library was established in 1892, after the state passed enabling legislation encouraging the creation of such public facilities. The library collection was originally housed in the North Hampton Town Hall, and a drive to build a dedicated facility began in 1899. Boston architect J. Lawrence Berry's first design, submitted in 1904, was rejected by the town meeting as too expensive to build, and the present design was accepted and built in 1907. A new library building was constructed in 1973, and this building has since housed town offices.

== See also ==
- National Register of Historic Places listings in Rockingham County, New Hampshire
