= First Congregational Church (Farmington, New Hampshire) =

Historic church in New Hampshire, United States

- U.S. National Register of Historic Places
- NH State Register of Historic Places
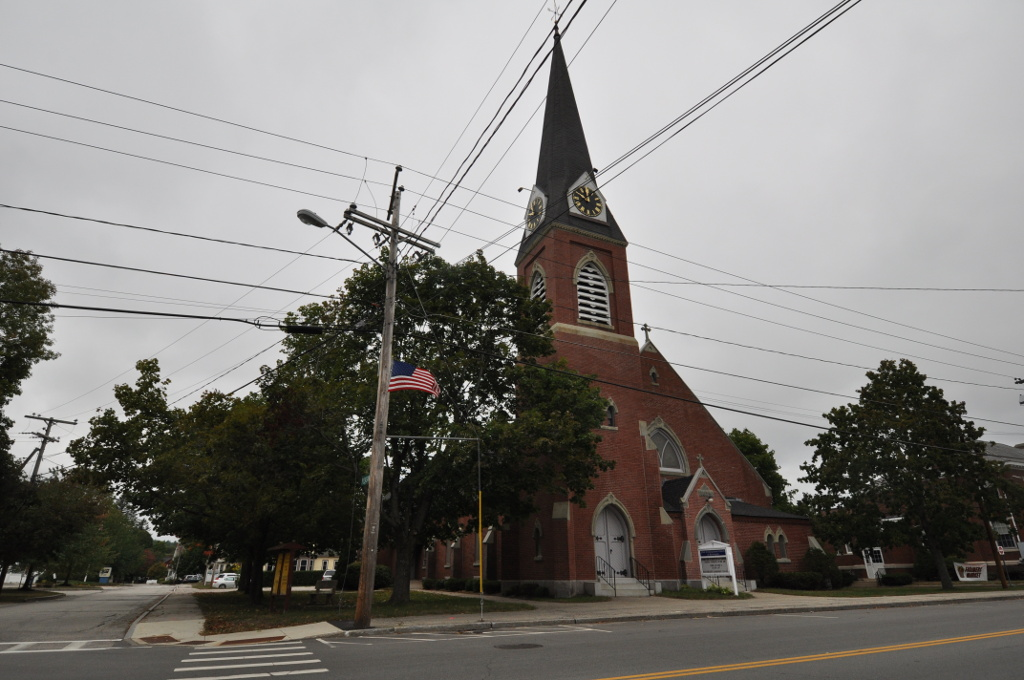

- Location within New Hampshire Location within the United States
- Location: 400 Main St., Farmington, New Hampshire
- Coordinates: 43°23′20″N 71°3′53″W
- Built: 1875
- Architect: Frederick N. Footman
- Architectural style: Gothic Revival
- NRHP reference No.: 100001963

Significant dates
- Added to NRHP: January 12, 2018
- Designated NHSRHP: July 31, 2017

The First Congregational Church is a historic church at 400 Main Street in Farmington, New Hampshire. Built in 1875 for a congregation founded in 1819, it is the oldest church building in the town, and a distinctive example of Gothic Revival architecture designed by New Hampshire native Frederick N. Footman. The church was added to the National Register of Historic Places in 2018, and the New Hampshire State Register of Historic Places in 2017. The congregation is affiliated with the United Church of Christ.

== Description and history ==
The First Congregational Church stands in the town center of Farmington, on the west side of Main Street (New Hampshire Route 153) at Pleasant Street. It is a red brick building, with a basically rectangular plan covered by a gabled roof. A square tower projects from the left front corner, rising 120 feet (37 m) and housing a clock and belfry before terminating in a steeple surmounted by a cross. The bell was dedicated in 1918 to the memory of politician Henry Wilson, who was a member of the congregation in his youth. The interior retains a number of original features, including chair rails, Gothic choir pews, and massive wooden roof trusses. It has a series of particularly fine stained glass windows that are original to its construction.

The church was built in 1875 to a design to Frederick Footman. Footman was a native of Somersworth, who was one of the first enrollees in the architecture program of the Massachusetts Institute of Technology. The congregation was founded in 1819, and built its first dedicated sanctuary across the street in 1844. That building burned during a blizzard in 1875, and the present building was constructed on land donated by a wealthy local businessman.

== See also ==
- National Register of Historic Places listings in Strafford County, New Hampshire
