= Freewill Baptist Church-Peoples Baptist Church-New Hope Church =

Historic church in New Hampshire, United States

- U.S. National Register of Historic Places
- NH State Register of Historic Places
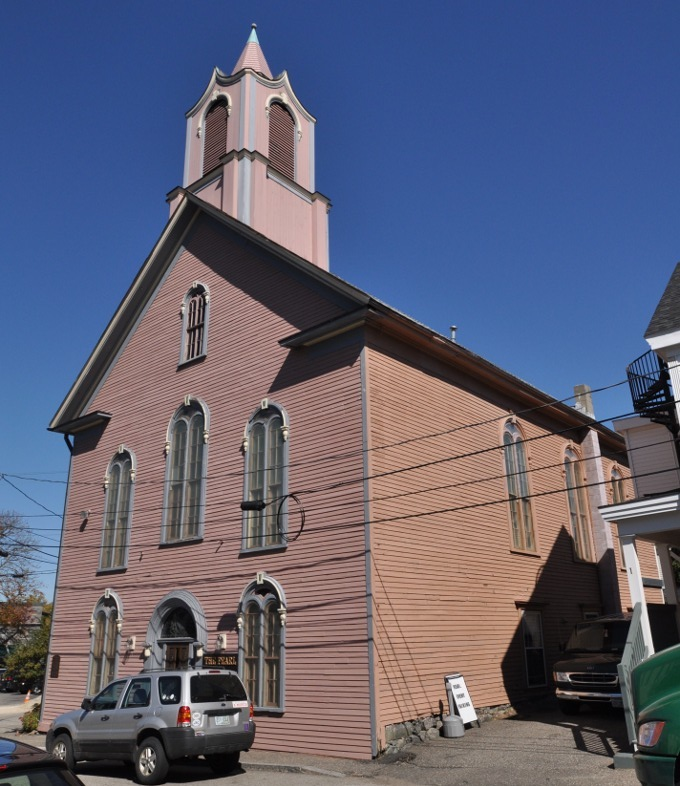

- Location within New Hampshire Location within the United States
- Location: 45 Pearl St., Portsmouth, New Hampshire
- Coordinates: 43°4′32″N 70°45′49″W
- Area: less than one acre
- Built: 1868
- Architect: Nathan Tarlton
- Architectural style: Italianate
- NRHP reference No.: 03000925

Significant dates
- Added to NRHP: September 13, 2003
- Designated NHSRHP: January 28, 2002

The Freewill Baptist Church—Peoples Baptist Church—New Hope Church is a historic structure built in 1868 located at 45 Pearl Street in Portsmouth, New Hampshire. The building, a fine local example of Italianate ecclesiastical architecture, was once owned by an African-American congregation. It was listed on the National Register of Historic Places in September 2002, and the New Hampshire State Register of Historic Places in January 2002. Later home to the Portsmouth Pearl, a center of arts and culture, it has more recently hosted art exhibitions, theatrical productions, and event rentals. As of June 2021, the building is listed for sale at nearly $1.5 million.

== Description and history ==
The building is located just outside Portsmouth's central downtown business district, at the junction of Pearl and Hanover Streets. It is a two-story wood-frame structure, with a gabled roof and clapboarded exterior. Its main facade, facing Pearl Street, is three bays wide, with a center entrance set in a rounded-arch opening. The windows of the facade are elongated rounded-arch windows, set by pairs in round-arch opening in which the lozenge above is of stained glass. Rising from the roof ridge above the entrance is a short tower, with a flushboarded first stage that has corner pilasters, and a second belfry stage with round-arch louvered openings. The tower is finished with a short octagonal steeple.

The church was built in 1857, originally shorter and without the tower. It was enlarged in 1868 by adding 10 feet (3.0 m) to the front. It is an excellent local example of religious Italianate architecture, and is further notable as the first church building in New Hampshire to be owned by a predominantly African-American congregation. The church was built for a Freewill Baptist congregation, which also made the 1868 expansion. It was purchased in 1915 by an African-American offshoot of the Middle Street Baptist Church, which organized as the People's Baptist Church in 1893. It was the first church in Portsmouth to be owned by an African-American congregation. That congregation owned the building until 1984, when it reorganized and moved to a new space. Martin Luther King Jr. preached at the church on October 26, 1952.

== See also ==
- Free Will Baptist
- National Register of Historic Places listings in Rockingham County, New Hampshire
