= Temple Town Hall =

- U.S. National Register of Historic Places
- NH State Register of Historic Places
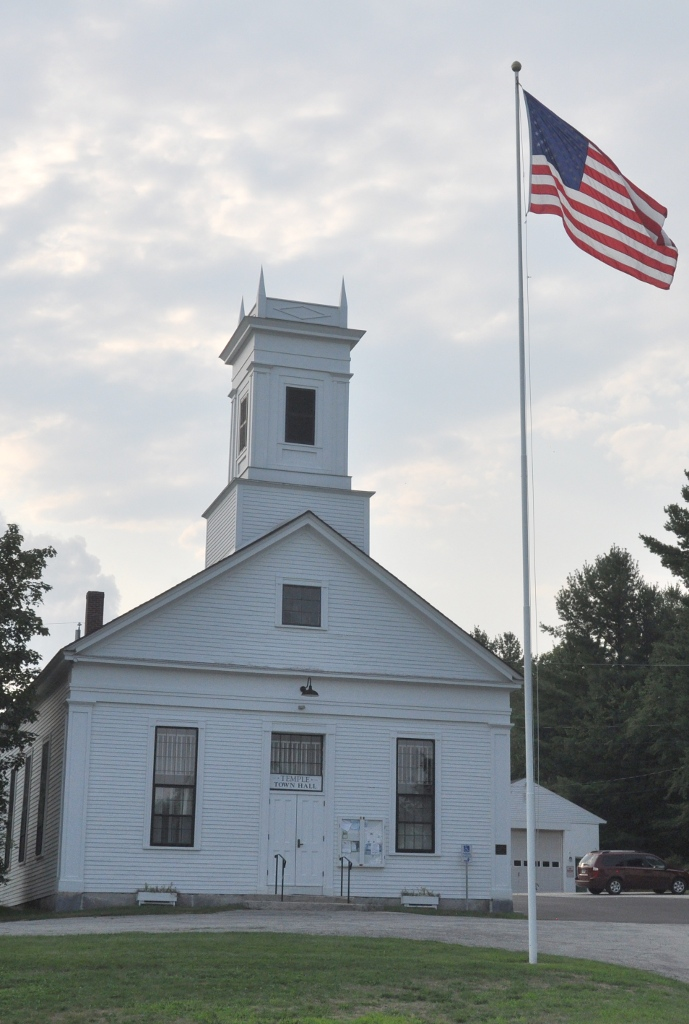

- Location within New Hampshire Location within the United States
- Location: Main St., jct. of NH 45 and Gen. Miller Hwy., Temple, New Hampshire
- Coordinates: 42°49′12″N 71°51′8″W
- Area: less than one acre
- Built: 1842
- Architectural style: Greek Revival
- NRHP reference No.: 07000551

Significant dates
- Added to NRHP: June 12, 2007
- Designated NHSRHP: April 30, 2007

The Temple Town Hall, also known as the Union Hall and the Miller Grange Hall, is a historic municipal building in the center of Temple, New Hampshire. Built in 1842, it is a fine example of Greek Revival architecture, which has served the community as a church, Grange hall, and town hall. It continues to be used for social functions. The building was listed on the National Register of Historic Places in June 2007, and the New Hampshire State Register of Historic Places in April 2007.

== Description and history ==
The Temple Town Hall is located in the village center of Temple on the west side of Main Street. It is a single-story structure, its original core built out of heavy timber framing. It is covered by a gabled roof and sheathed in wooden clapboards. A square tower rises above the east-facing front facade. The main facade is three bays wide, with corner pilasters rising to an entablature and fully pedimented gable. The main entrance is at its center, topped by a large multipane transom window. The tower has a plain first stage finished in clapboards, while the second stage, housing the belfry, is finished in flushboarding with louvered openings.

The structure was built in 1842 as a church. In 1875, the building was sold to the local grange chapter, which enlarged the building in the 1880s, adding 20 feet (6.1 m) to its length. This additional space provided interior space for a stage, which was used for grange rituals and dramatic presentations. The town purchased the building from the grange in 1889, although it continued to be used by the grange in addition to serving as a place for town functions. It was used by the town as a meeting space until 1990, and continues to be used for social functions.

== See also ==
- National Register of Historic Places listings in Hillsborough County, New Hampshire
