= Smith Chapel (Durham, New Hampshire) =

- U.S. National Register of Historic Places
- NH State Register of Historic Places
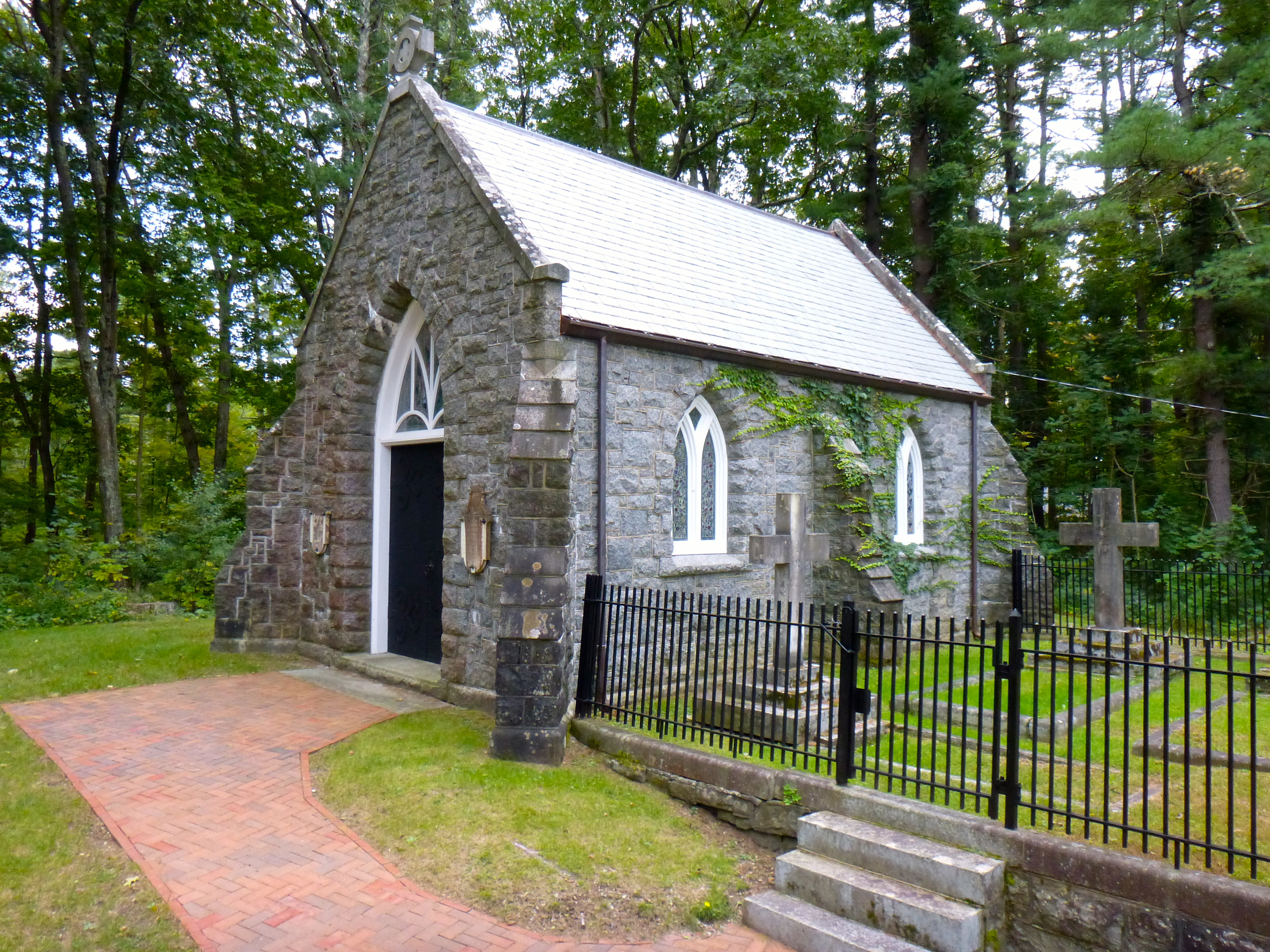

- Location within New Hampshire Location within the United States
- Location: 45 Mill Pond Road, Durham, New Hampshire
- Coordinates: 43°07′42″N 70°55′27″W
- Area: 1.84 acres (0.74 ha)
- Built: 1900
- Architectural style: Gothic Revival
- NRHP reference No.: 13000009

Significant dates
- Added to NRHP: February 13, 2013
- Designated NHSRHP: April 29, 2013

Smith Chapel is a historic memorial chapel at 45 Mill Pond Road in Durham, New Hampshire, United States. Built in 1900 in the family cemetery of the locally prominent Smith family, it is a prominent local example of Late Gothic Revival architecture. It is now part of a small municipal park. The chapel was listed on the National Register of Historic Places in February 2013, and the New Hampshire State Register of Historic Places in April 2013.

== Description and history ==
Smith Chapel is located in a small park about 2 acres (0.81 ha) in size, overlooking the Oyster River. Its setting was originally near the rear of the 70-acre (28 ha) summer estate of the Smith family, which has since been subdivided into a residential area. It is a single-story rectangular structure, built out of rusticate granite stone blocks quarried locally. It is covered by a steeply pitched gable roof, and has buttressed corners. The sides of the chapel each have two Gothic windows, while one of the gable ends houses the entrance, also topped by a lancet window. The opposite gable has a larger window. All of the windows have stained glass designs by Redding and Baird of Boston, Massachusetts. The interior continues the Gothic features, with scissor trusses supporting the roof, and a shallow altar.

The chapel was built on the site of the family cemetery of the locally prominent Smith family by Alice Smith in 1900 as a memorial to her recently deceased husband, Hamilton Smith, a wealthy mining engineer. Its architect is unknown. The property, including the small cemetery in which both family members and pets are interred, remained in the family until 1979, when it was donated to the town.

== See also ==
- National Register of Historic Places listings in Strafford County, New Hampshire
