= Pelham Library and Memorial Building =

- U.S. National Register of Historic Places
- NH State Register of Historic Places
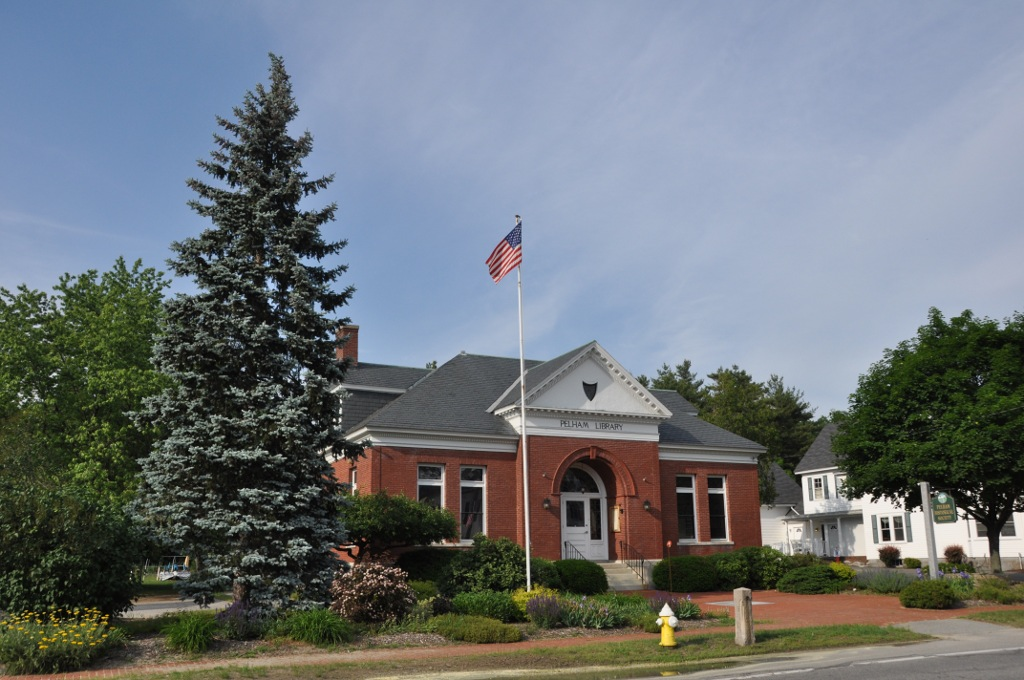

- Location within New Hampshire Location within the United States
- Location: 5 Main St., Pelham, New Hampshire
- Coordinates: 42°44′2″N 71°19′19″W
- Area: less than one acre
- Built: 1895
- Architect: Frederick W. Stickney
- Architectural style: Classical Revival
- NRHP reference No.: 11000191

Significant dates
- Added to NRHP: April 15, 2011
- Designated NHSRHP: July 28, 2008

The Pelham Library and Memorial Building is a historic former library building at 6 Main Street in Pelham, New Hampshire. Built in 1895, it was the town's first dedicated library building, and also serves as a memorial to its military members. It served as a library until 2003, and is now home to the Pelham Historical Society. The building was listed on the National Register of Historic Places in 2011, and the New Hampshire State Register of Historic Places in 2008.

== Description and history ==
The former Pelham Library and Memorial Building is located on the north side of the town's village center, on the north side of Main Street adjacent to the 1846 Greek Revival First Congregational Church. It is a single-story masonry structure, built out of brick with wooden trim. It is covered by a hip roof and rests on a cut granite foundation. Its main facade is three bays wide, the center bay projecting and topped by a pedimented gable. The main entrance is recessed in this bay, under a rounded archway. The outside of the arch is decorated with projecting brickwork, and the building corners have brick quoining. Front-facing windows have large fixed panes topped by smaller transom windows.

The building was designed by Frederick W. Stickney, and built in 1895–96. Its construction was funded by the town, in part to mark the 150th anniversary of its incorporation, and to provide a dedicated space for its public library, which had been housed in a variety of locations since its founding in 1797. It served as the town's sole library building until 2003, when that function was moved to a new building nearby.

== See also ==
- National Register of Historic Places listings in Hillsborough County, New Hampshire
