= Bolduc Block =

- U.S. National Register of Historic Places
- NH State Register of Historic Places
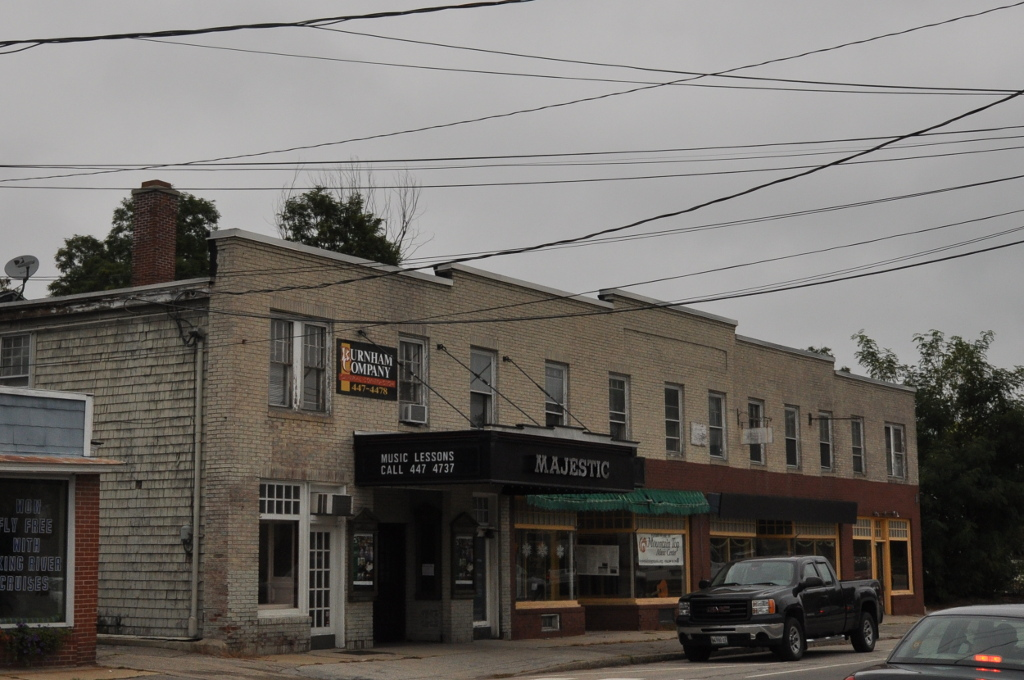

- Location within New Hampshire Location within the United States
- Location: 36 Main St., Conway, New Hampshire
- Coordinates: 43°58′44″N 71°7′12″W
- Area: less than one acre
- Built: 1923
- NRHP reference No.: 16000642

Significant dates
- Added to NRHP: September 20, 2016
- Designated NHSRHP: October 26, 2015

The Bolduc Block, also known as the Majestic Theater, is a historic commercial and theatrical building at 36 Main Street in Conway, New Hampshire. Built in 1923, it was the community's first theater. It is also a good local example of Art Deco architecture, a style uncommon in northern New Hampshire, fire damage to its interior. The building was listed on the National Register of Historic Places in 2016, and the New Hampshire State Register of Historic Places in 2015. It is presently owned by the Mountain Top Music Center.

== Description and history ==
The Bolduc Block stands in the historic town center of Conway, on the north side of Main Street (New Hampshire Routes 16 and 113), west of its junction with Washington and Pleasant streets. It is a single-story structure, its exterior finished in brick. The front is defined by a projecting marquee over the main theater entrance on the left side, a series of storefronts to its right, and an Art Deco stepped parapet above. The interior, damaged by fire in 2005 and restored, retains some original features, including cast iron radiators and light fixtures.

The block was built in 1923, replacing several smaller commercial buildings that had been destroyed by fire. Its theater was at first known as the "New Conway Theatre", but was formally opened as the Majestic Theater in 1931. The storefronts have over the years housed a number of businesses, as well as the local post office for a time. It was restored after the 2005 fire extensively damaged its interior spaces. The building has been acquired by the Mountain Top Music School, a local music education and performance organization, with the intent (as of early 2017) of reopening it as a performance venue.

== See also ==
- National Register of Historic Places listings in Carroll County, New Hampshire
