= Union Chapel (Hillsborough, New Hampshire) =

- U.S. National Register of Historic Places
- NH State Register of Historic Places
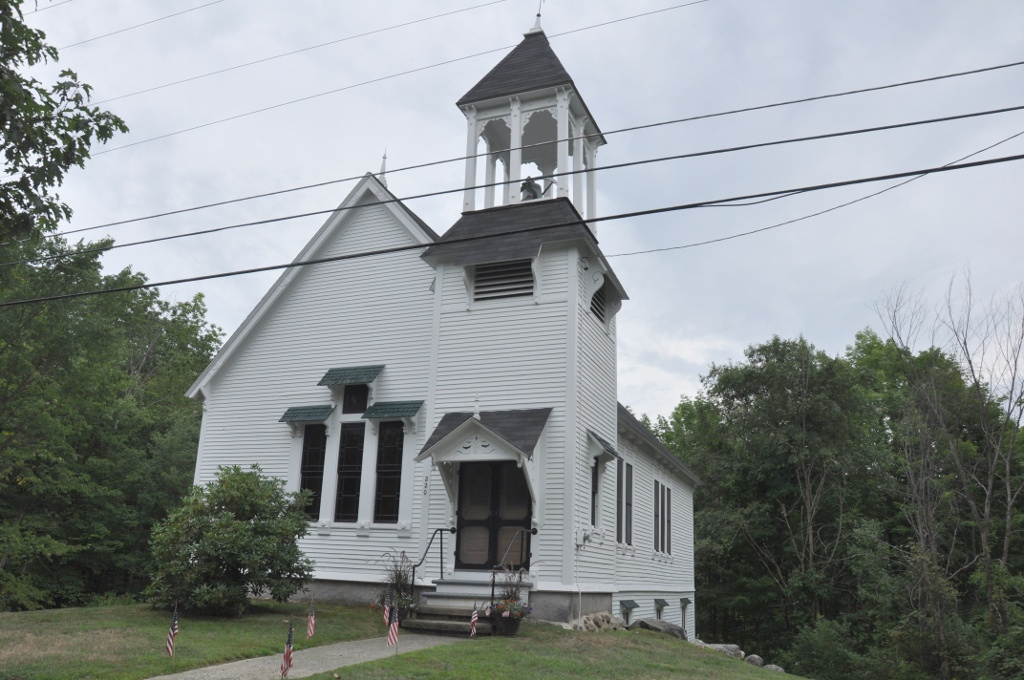

- Location within New Hampshire Location within the United States
- Location: 220 Sawmill Rd., Hillsborough, New Hampshire
- Coordinates: 43°6′46″N 71°56′37″W
- Area: less than one acre
- Built: 1887
- Architect: John Jackman
- Architectural style: Queen Anne, Stick/Eastlake
- NRHP reference No.: 08001411

Significant dates
- Added to NRHP: February 3, 2009
- Designated NHSRHP: July 31, 2006

Union Chapel is a historic chapel in Hillsborough, New Hampshire. Completed in 1887, it has been a center of local civic life since then, and is architecturally a distinctive local example of Stick/Eastlake design. The building was added to the National Register of Historic Places in 2009, and the New Hampshire State Register of Historic Places in 2006.

== Description and history ==
Hillsborough's Union Chapel is located in Hillsborough Lower Village, on the south side of Sawmill Road a short way east of the 2nd New Hampshire Turnpike. It is a single-story wood-frame structure, with a gabled roof, clapboarded exterior, and granite foundation. A square tower projects slightly from the right side of the main facade, with an open belfry capped by a hip roof. Windows are set in groups that share bracketed sills. Those on the front facade are topped by small shed roofs. The windows feature colored glass panes. The interior is finished primarily in varnished woodwork.

The Ladies Aid Society, a group formed to provide a meeting area and chapel in the Lower Village area of Hillsborough, had the structure built in 1886–7 at a cost of $2,081.38. The funds were raised mainly within the Lower Hillsborough community, with the single largest donation coming from native son Benjamin Pierce Cheney. It was designed by John Jackman, a local architect, and was apparently based on a slightly larger church built by Jackman in neighboring Henniker. The chapel was used for religious services mainly during the warmer months, and has also been a center of community activities since its construction.

== See also ==
- National Register of Historic Places listings in Hillsborough County, New Hampshire
