= Rye Town Hall (New Hampshire) =

- U.S. National Register of Historic Places
- NH State Register of Historic Places
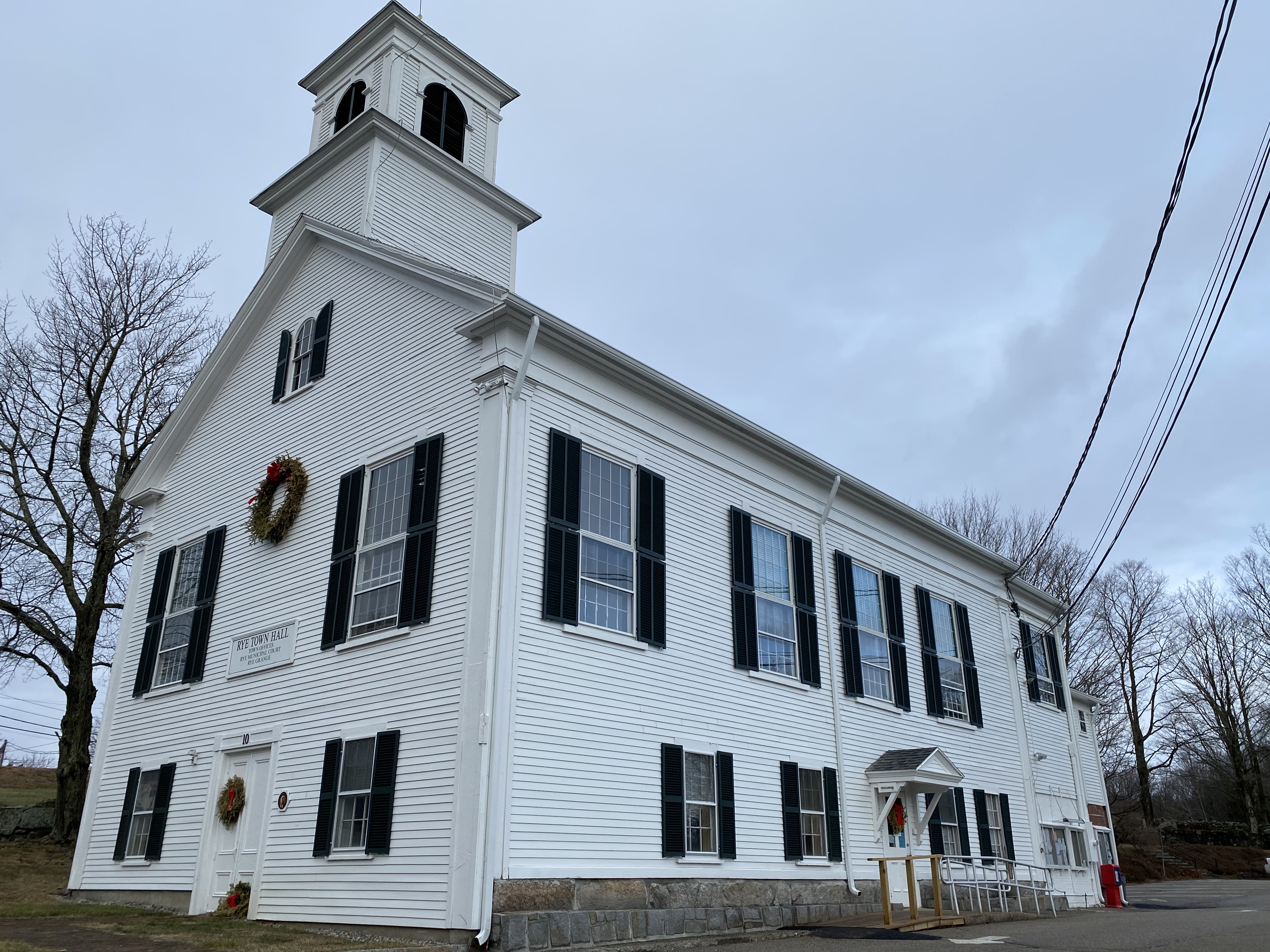

- Location within New Hampshire Location within the United States
- Location: 10 Central Road, Rye, New Hampshire
- Coordinates: 43.0104°N 70.7736°W
- Built: 1839
- Architectural style: Greek Revival
- NRHP reference No.: 100005705

Significant dates
- Added to NRHP: October 29, 2020
- Designated NHSRHP: April 29, 2013

Rye Town Hall is a historic town hall located at 10 Central Road in Rye, New Hampshire. Constructed in 1839 and purchased by the town in 1873, it was listed on the National Register of Historic Places in 2020, and the New Hampshire State Register of Historic Places in 2013.

== History ==
The building was constructed in 1839 to serve as a Methodist church. It filled that role for approximately 30 years, after which it fell into disuse. In 1873, the building was purchased by the town of Rye for $1000, with an additional $2658 spent on renovations. This included adding to the front of the building, along with moving the bell tower forward. At some point, believed to be in the final quarter of the 19th century, the building was raised to add a ground-level story. Further additions to the building were constructed by the town in 1890 and 1911.

== See also ==
- National Register of Historic Places listings in Rockingham County, New Hampshire
