= New Hampshire State Register of Historic Places =

Government program for historic properties in New Hampshire

Marker for properties listed in the New Hampshire State Register of Historic Places

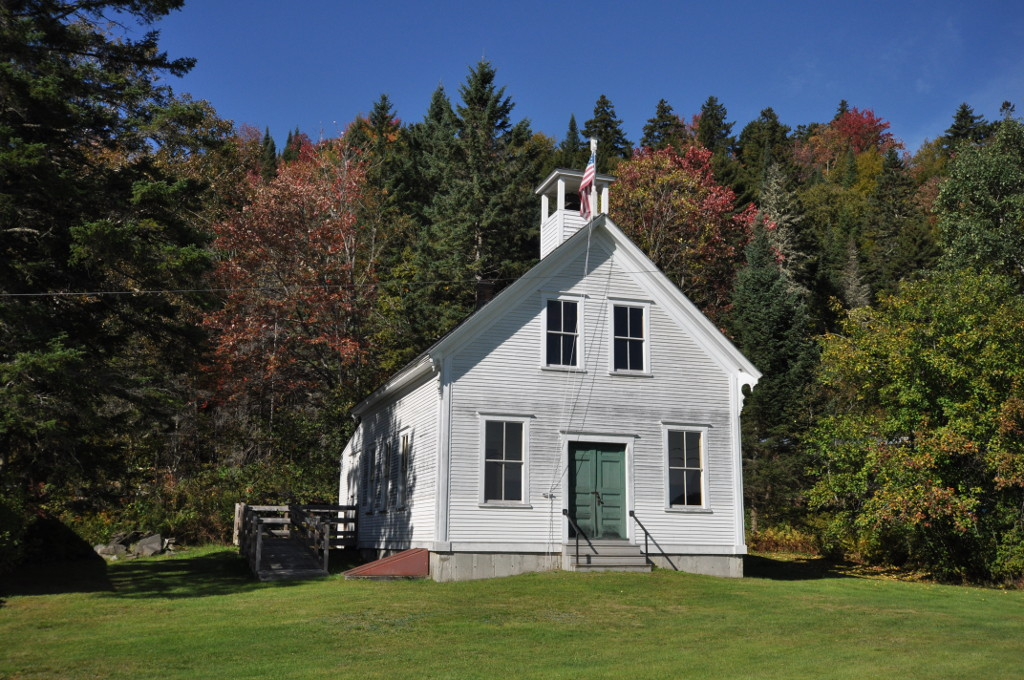
Indian Stream Schoolhouse in Pittsburg is the northernmost property in the State Register.

The New Hampshire State Register of Historic Places (NHSRHP) is a register of historic places administered by the state of New Hampshire and the New Hampshire Division of Historical Resources. Buildings, districts, sites, landscapes (such as cemeteries, parks or town forests), structures, or objects can be added to the register. The register was initiated in 2001 and is authorized by RSA 227 C:33.

As of October 2019, there were 406 properties in the State Register, 54 of which were also in the National Register of Historic Places. (Note: There are numerous New Hampshire properties listed in the National Register that are not listed in the State Register.) In some instances, the State Register lists multiple buildings individually, while the same buildings are encompassed by a single entry in the National Register—two such examples are the Hebron Village Historic District and the Waumbek Cottages Historic District. Bennington and Francestown, neighboring towns in Hillsborough County, each have 35 properties listed in the State Register, the most of any town or city. An unknown number of properties were formerly in the State Register, but have been de-listed.

Once a property is listed, there are no restrictions or requirements imposed by the state, and owners can maintain, manage or demolish the property as they choose. However, any change that harms or destroys its historical significance can result in removal from the register.

== Criteria ==
Sites eligible for listing are those that possess any of the following:

1. ability to tell the story of a significant event or a longer historical trend;
2. relation to a person who made important contributions to a community, profession or local tradition;
3. tangible merit, such as well-preserved example of local architecture, building methods, etc.;
4. identified, but unexcavated and unevaluated archeological site.

Properties listed in the New Hampshire State Register of Historic Places may also be recognized in the National Register of Historic Places, be listed as a National Historic Landmark, or listed as a contributing property in a National Historic District.

== Properties listed ==
The following table is a partial list of properties in the New Hampshire State Register of Historic Places. The New Hampshire Division of Historical Resources is the agency responsible for overseeing the State Register, and other state historic preservation programs. All properties added to the State Register through July 2012 are listed; more recently added properties are incomplete.

| Name | Image | Location | County | Date (Note: The character string below each date is the identifier assigned to the property in the State Register; those in italics do not appear in the most recent State Register and may have been delisted.) | Description |
|---|---|---|---|---|---|
| The 1937 Terminal | | 27 Navigator Road, Londonderry | Rockingham | July 26, 2004 (LON0207) | Previously located on East Perimeter Road within Manchester. Moved to its current location in late June 2004; houses the Aviation Museum of New Hampshire. |
| Abbot-Spalding House† | | 1 Abbot Square, Nashua | Hillsborough | April 29, 2002 (NAS0003) | Built in 1804. |
| Abenaki Indian Shop and Camp† | | Intervale Cross Road, Conway | Carroll | July 1, 1992 (Note: Listing date appears to precede establishment of the State Register in 2001.) (CNW0214) | Established in the late 19th century by Chief Joseph Laurent; now a small town park. |
| Acworth Town Hall | | 13 Town Hall Road, Acworth | Sullivan | January 27, 2003 (ACW0007) | Built in 1821. Located next to the Acworth Congregational Church. |
| Benjamin Aldrich Homestead† | | Aldrich Road, Colebrook | Coös | October 28, 2002 (COL0020) | Built in 1846. |
| Allenstown Meeting House† | | Deerfield Road, Allenstown | Merrimack | July 26, 2004 (ALL0007) | Built in 1815. |
| Allenstown Public Library | | 59 Main Street, Allenstown | Merrimack | April 28, 2008 (ALL0010) | WPA-erected, circa 1934–35. |
| Thomas Ayres Homestead | | 47 Park Avenue, Greenland | Rockingham | April 30, 2007 (GRL0021) | Built circa 1737. |
| Baptist New Meeting House† | | 461 Main Street, New London | Merrimack | April 25, 2005 (NWL0002) | Built in 1826. |
| Bartlett Engine House† | | U.S. Route 302, Bartlett | Carroll | July 28, 2008 (BRT0033) | Built in 1887–88. |
| Bennington Village Historic District | | Main Street and Francestown Road area, Bennington | Hillsborough | July 28, 2008 (BNN0012 et al.) | District consists of 130 individual properties; 36 listed when added to the register. |
| Benson's Wild Animal Farm | | 27 Kimball Hill Road, Hudson | Hillsborough | April 29, 2002 (HUD0007, HUD0009, UNKNOWN) | Photo shows Office and Kitchen building. Three buildings have been listed: the Bush Hill Road Barn, the Office and Kitchen, and the Hudson Center Railroad Station (which may have been delisted). |
| Bethany Chapel | | 54 Newbury Road, Londonderry | Rockingham | October 25, 2001 (LON0007) | Still in use by the United Church of Christ. Address sometimes listed as Manchester, as it sits on the border of the two communities. |
| Blair Covered Bridge | | Blair Road, Campton | Grafton | July 27, 2009 (CAM0007) | Built in 1829 over the Pemigewasset River. Damaged by a tropical storm in 2011; repaired and reopened in 2015. |
| Blanchard-Bowers House | | 6 Manchester Street, Merrimack | Hillsborough | January 24, 2005 (MER0005) | Building is at left of photo. Built circa 1726 and subsequently expanded twice. Now houses administrative offices of Thomas More College of Liberal Arts. |
| Bolduc Block† | | 36 Main Street, Conway | Carroll | October 26, 2015 (CNW0181) | Also known as the Majestic Theater; built in 1923. |
| Bow Bog Meeting House | | 111 Bow Bog Road, Bow | Merrimack | January 24, 2011 (BOW0012) | Built in 1835. Steeple houses a bell donated in 1904 by Mary Baker Eddy. |
| John Bowker House | | 75 Winter Street, Keene | Cheshire | October 30, 2006 (KEE0183) | Built in 1866. Italianate architecture. |
| Brick Schoolhouse† | | 432 Route 123, Sharon | Hillsborough | October 25, 2001 (SHA0001) | Built in 1832. |
| Bridges House† | | 21 Mountain Road, Concord | Merrimack | July 25, 2005 (CON0148) | Built in 1836. Governor's official residence since 1969. |
| Brown Company Barns | | 137 East Milan Road, Berlin | Coös | April 28, 2003 (BER0015A, BER0015B) | Thompson Farm Barn and Maynesboro Farm Barn. |
| Brown Library | | 25 Liberty Lane, Seabrook | Rockingham | April 26, 2010 (SEA0022) | Built in 1892; moved by the town in 1994. |
| Burch House | | 249 Main Street, Bethlehem | Grafton | October 28, 2002 (BET0006) | |
| Burley Homestead | | 264 & 270 North River Road, Epping | Rockingham | July 25, 2011 (EPP0011) | Two houses dating to c. 1752 on 290 acres (120 ha). |
| Carroll County Courthouse† | | Route 171, Ossipee | Carroll | October 27, 2003 (OSS0012) | Built in 1916. |
| Centennial High School | | 9 Elm Street, Milford | Hillsborough | April 26, 2004 (MIL0003) | Built in 1894 and served as the town's high school; became the Bales Elementary School in 1969—no longer in use. |
| Chamberlain Bridge | | Daniel Webster Highway, Merrimack | Hillsborough | July 28, 2003 (MER0004) | Double stone arch bridge built in 1921 over the Souhegan River. |
| Cheshire Place | | 122 Hampshire Road, Rindge | Cheshire | July 29, 2002 (RIN0002) | Now site of the Hampshire Country School. |
| Chichester Grange Hall | | 54 Main Street, Chichester | Merrimack | July 19, 2010 (CHI0045) | Built in 1889; part of the building has served as town offices since the early 1980s. |
| Chichester Town House | | 161 Main Street, Chichester | Merrimack | October 28, 2012 (CHI0047) | Built in 1845–1847; has served as the town library since 1899. |
| Chocorua Grange Hall | | 13 Gregs Way, Tamworth | Carroll | January 28, 2002 (TAM0001) | Was owned by the Tamworth Historical Society from 1961 to 2007. |
| Citizens Hall | | 21 Main Street, Chesterfield | Cheshire | July 26, 2001 (CHS0006) | First property, along with Clark House Museum Complex, added to the State Register. Built in 1886 in West Chesterfield, it now houses the Actors Theatre Playhouse. |
| Clark House Museum Complex | | 233 South Main Street, Wolfeboro | Carroll | July 26, 2001 (WOL0001) | First property, along with Citizens Hall, added to the State Register. |
| Clinton Grove Academy | | 269 Hodgdon Road, Weare | Hillsborough | January 26, 2004 (WEA0010) | Built in 1874. |
| Colonial Theater | | 2050 Main Street, Bethlehem | Grafton | April 29, 2002 (BET0005) | Built in 1915. |
| Colonial Theatre | | 95 Main Street, Keene | Cheshire | July 26, 2004 (KEE0174) | Originally opened on January 29, 1924, it fell out of use by 1945, then was restored and reopened in 1995. |
| Noah Cooke House† | | 143 Daniels Hill Road, Keene | Cheshire | July 29, 2002 (KEE0020) | Built in 1791; moved to current site in 1973. State Register listing includes archeological site. |
| Corner School House† | | River Road and Poocham Road, Westmoreland | Cheshire | January 29, 2007 (WES0004) | Also known as High Tops School or Schoolhouse No. 9. Built in 1789 and remodeled in 1846. |
| Daloz / Johnson / Bradford Mill | | 4 Tannery Hill Road, Hancock | Hillsborough | April 29, 2002 (HAN0001) | |
| Dana House | | 31 Elm Street, Lebanon | Grafton | October 25, 2004 (LEB0003) | Built circa 1765. |
| District No. 2 Schoolhouse | | 88 Lowell Street, Manchester | Hillsborough | January 27, 2003 (MAN0062) | Also known as the Old High School. |
| District No. 5 Schoolhouse | | 6 School Street, Salem | Rockingham | April 25, 2011 (SAL0102) | In use from 1873 to 1944. |
| District No. 8 Schoolhouse | | Acworth Road, Charlestown | Sullivan | July 29, 2002 (CHA0010) | Built in 1824; dimensions of approximately 21 by 17 feet (6.4 by 5.2 m). |
| District No. 13 Schoolhouse | | 7 Cherry Hill Road, Grafton | Grafton | October 25, 2010 (GRA0015) | Also known as the Pines School or Depot School. |
| East Grafton School / Town Hall | | 35 Grafton Turnpike, Grafton | Grafton | October 25, 2010 (GRA0014) | Built in 1900; now serves as the East Grafton Town Hall. |
| East Grafton Union Church and Parsonage | | Grafton Turnpike, Grafton | Grafton | October 25, 2010 (GRA0019) | Dates to 1785; moved and renovated during the 19th century. |
| Emery's Tavern | | 61 Mountain Road, Concord | Merrimack | July 26, 2004 (CON0147) | Two-story Georgian-style house; operated as a tavern by 1812, possibly built circa 1804. |
| Enfield Village Historic District† | | Enfield | Grafton | April 25, 2011 (UNKNOWN) | Apparently de-listed and replaced by individual properties added to the register in 2012. |
| Epsom Town Hall | | 1598 Dover Road, Epsom | Merrimack | January 26, 2004 (EPS0094) | |
| Evans Block | | 48–52 Main Street, Lancaster | Coös | October 28, 2002 (LAN0002) | Evans Block is on the right side of the photo. |
| First Congregational Church† | | 400 Main Street, Farmington | Strafford | July 31, 2017 (FAR0024) | Built in 1875. |
| Folsom Tavern | | 164 Water Street, Exeter | Rockingham | October 29, 2018 (EXE0019) | Built in 1775. Now part of the American Independence Museum. |
| Folsom's Tavern / Odiorne Farm | | 1 Back River Road, Durham | Strafford | July 31, 2006 (UNKNOWN) | Built circa 1805. |
| Forest Glade Cemetery† | | 163 Maple St, Somersworth | Strafford | October 25, 2021 (SOM0325) | Developed in 1851, Forest Glade Cemetery is a notable example of the mid-19th century Rural Cemetery Movement |
| Fort at Number 4 | | 267 Springfield Road, Charlestown, | Sullivan | July 2020 (TBA) | Open-air museum dating to 1960 that re-creates the mid-18th century stockade fort. |
| Four Corners Farm | | 195 Isaac Frye Highway, Wilton | Hillsborough | July 28, 2003 (WIL0003) | First settled circa 1760. Now home to the Temple-Wilton Community Farm. |
| Francestown Main Street Historic District | | Main Street and Oak Hill Road, Francestown | Hillsborough | July 28, 2008 (FRN0019 et al.) | District consists of 44 individual properties; 27 listed when added to the register. |
| Francestown Mill Village Historic District | | New Boston Road area, Francestown | Hillsborough | July 28, 2008 (FRN0003 et al.) | District consists of 10 individual properties; six listed when added to the register. |
| Freedom Village Grammar School | | 33 Old Portland Road, Freedom | Carroll | April 25, 2011 (FRE0004) | Built in 1895; remained in use through 1983. |
| Glidden House | | 203 Wadleigh Falls Road, Lee | Strafford | October 24, 2011 (LEE0009) | Built in the mid-18th century; Greek Revival architecture. |
| Glidden-Towle-Edgerly House | | 194 Wadleigh Falls Road, Lee | Strafford | October 25, 2010 (LEE0008) | Sections date to 1749 and 1828; nearly lost to arson in 2010. |
| Gorham Town Hall | | 20 Park Street, Gorham | Coös | January 24, 2005 (GOR0008) | Building is at right of photo. Built in 1919. |
| Nathan Gould House | | 1460 Route 123 N, Stoddard | Cheshire | October 26, 2009 (STO0004) | Built in 1833. |
| Goss Farm Barn | | 251 Harbor Road, Rye | Rockingham | April 25, 2011 (RYE0017) | Built c. 1800. |
| Grace Episcopal Church | | 106 Lowell Street, Manchester | Hillsborough | October 25, 2001 (MAN0010) | Built in 1860 on the site of an earlier church dating to 1843. |
| Grasmere Schoolhouse No. 9 and Town Hall† | | 86 Center Street, Goffstown | Hillsborough | August 7, 2023 | Built as the town meetinghouse for Grasmere and currently used as a preschool. |
| Graves Homestead | | 335 Middle Road, Brentwood | Rockingham | April 26, 2004 (BRE0006) | Built circa 1809. |
| Gregg-Montgomery House | | 105 Bible Hill Road, Francestown | Hillsborough | April 27, 2009 (FRN0002) | Built during 1773–1778. |
| Sarah and Simon Green Farm | | 77 Sheepboro Road, Farmington | Strafford | July 26, 2004 (FAR0016) | |
| Greenfield Elementary School | | 7 Sawmill Road, Greenfield | Hillsborough | January 27, 2003 (GRE0001) | Now the Greenfield Town Office. |
| Gunstock Mountain Ski Area | | Gilford | Belknap | January 30, 2012 (GLF0070) | Opened in 1937. |
| Haley Homestead | | 41 Birch Hill Road, Lee | Strafford | January 26, 2004 (LEE0002) | |
| Hampstead Congregational Church | | 61 Main Street, Hampstead | Rockingham | August 7, 2023 | A fine example of transitional Greek Revival and Italianate architecture which has long served as a place of worship and musical performance. |
| Hampton Beach Fire Station | | 64 Ashworth Avenue, Hampton | Rockingham | October 25, 2010 (HAM0035) | Built in 1923; demolished in late 2013 after a replacement station was built on an adjacent lot. |
| Samuel R. Hanson House | | 326 Rochester Hill Road, Rochester | Strafford | July 25, 2005 (ROC0005) | |
| Haverhill Lime Kilns | | Lime Kiln Road at Chippewa Trailhead, Haverhill | Grafton | July 30, 2007 (HAV0073) | Two kilns, constructed in 1838 and 1842. |
| Head Chapel and Cemetery | | 16 Pleasant Street, Hooksett | Merrimack | October 29, 2007 (HOK0017) | Built in 1839 as a school, remodeled in 1922 to serve as a chapel. |
| High Street Cemetery | | High Street, Benton | Grafton | January 30, 2012 (BEN0003) | 46 grave markers, dating from 1812 to 1877. |
| Hildreth-Jones Tavern‡ | | 18 Jones Road, Amherst | Hillsborough | January 26, 2004 (AMH0031) | Located within the Amherst Village Historic District. |
| Hills Memorial Library† | | 18 Library Street, Hudson | Hillsborough | April 30, 2012 (HUD0030) | Opened June 1909; closed May 2009. |
| Holman & Merriman Machine Shop† | | 63 Canal Street, Hinsdale | Cheshire | January 29, 2007 (HIN0019) | Built in 1837. |
| Holy Resurrection Orthodox Church and Rectory | | 99 Sullivan Street, Claremont | Sullivan | August 7, 2023 | An Eastern Orthodox Christian style church with a bell tower and onion dome topped with bronze Eastern Orthodox crosses. |
| Hooksett Town Hall | | 16 Main Street, Hooksett | Merrimack | July 27, 2009 (HOK0020) | In continuous use from 1828 to 2008. |
| Hooksett Village Bridge | | over the Merrimack River, Hooksett | Merrimack | April 28, 2008 (HOK0019) | Also known as the Lilac Bridge; demolished in July 2017. Built in 1909, it spanned the Merrimack River between Riverside Street and Veterans Drive, near Robie's Country Store. Replacement footbridge installed on original piers. |
| Indian Stream Schoolhouse† | | Tabor Road, Pittsburg | Coös | October 29, 2007 (PIT0012) | Built in 1897. |
| Island Street Mill Building | | Castle Street, Keene | Cheshire | April 29, 2002 (KEE0011) | Formerly 11 Island Street. See also West Street Mill Building. |
| Jackson Road Railroad Trestle | | over Jackson Road, Mason | Hillsborough | July 30, 2012 (MAS0002) | Now part of the town's rail trail. |
| Joshua Hill House | | 200 Portsmouth Avenue, Stratham | Rockingham | August 7, 2023 | A two-story timber-framed structure with a central chimney featuring Georgian architecture and Federal details. |
| Kelley's Corner School | | Route 129 at Sanborn Hill Road, Gilmanton | Belknap | April 28, 2008 (GLM0015) | Built circa 1778. |
| Kentlands | | 480 Burpee Hill Road, New London | Merrimack | October 27, 2008 (NWL0007) | Summer house near Little Sunapee Lake, built circa 1909. |
| Kinsman Cemetery | | Paine Road, Easton | Grafton | October 25, 2010 (EAS0001) | Donated to the town in 1798. |
| Kona Farm | | 50 Jacobs Road, Moultonborough | Carroll | July 19, 2010 (MOU0032) | Built in 1900–1902. Now operates as a hotel. |
| Lake Company Office | | 98 Elm Street, Laconia | Belknap | October 28, 2002 (LAC0013) | Located in the Lakeport neighborhood. |
| Lamprey House | | 953 Whittier Highway, Moultonborough | Carroll | October 25, 2004 (MOU0010) | Built circa 1812. Now headquarters of the Moultonborough Historical Society and adjacent to the also-listed Moultonborough Town House. |
| Robert Lane Farm House | | 33 Unity Road, Newport | Sullivan | April 27, 2009 (NWP0016) | Also known as the R. P. Claggett Farm. Built circa 1782. |
| Langdon Town Hall | | 5 Walker Hill Road, Langdon | Sullivan | July 30, 2012 (LAG0001) | Has hosted town meetings since 1803. Also known as the Old Meeting House. |
| Lee Town Hall | | 7 Mast Road, Lee | Strafford | January 29, 2018 (LEE0010) | |
| George W. Libbey House | | 34 Jefferson Road, Whitefield | Coös | April 29, 2002 (WHI0002) | Property now used by the Tri-County Community Action Program. |
| Lisbon Station | | Depot Street and Central Street, Lisbon | Grafton | April 28, 2008 (LIS0198) | Built circa 1875. Now a site along the Ammonoosuc Rail Trail. |
| Little Red Schoolhouse | | 13 Main Street, Milton Mills | Hillsborough | January 28, 2002 (MLT0001) | Building now houses the Milton Free Public Library. |
| Littleton Community House† | | 102 Main Street, Littleton | Grafton | April 30, 2007 (LTL0018) | Built in 1884 as a private residence; has served as a community center since 1919. |
| Jonathan Livermore House | | 65 Russell Hill Road, Wilton | Hillsborough | October 25, 2010 (WIL0020) | Built circa 1770. |
| Londonderry Grange #44 | | 260 Mammoth Road, Londonderry | Rockingham | October 25, 2004 (LON0093) | Built in 1909. |
| Long Island House Inn | | 76 Old Long Island Road, Moultonborough | Carroll | April 26, 2010 (MOU0019) | Established in 1874. |
| Mary Lyon Hall | | 3 Highland Avenue, Plymouth | Grafton | January 30, 2012 (PLY0023) | On the grounds of Plymouth State University; built in 1915. Named after Mary Lyon (1797–1849), an American pioneer in women's education. |
| Madison Corner School | | Route 113, Madison | Carroll | May 1, 2006 (MDI0012) | Built in 1835. |
| Maplewood | | 298 North River Road, Milford | Hillsborough | April 29, 2002 (MIL0002) | Also known as the Abner Hutchinson Farm. |
| Marelli's Market | | 465 Lafayette Road, Hampton | Rockingham | April 28, 2008 (HAM0029) | Built circa 1841; moved to its current location in 1900. |
| Maynard-Gates House | | 9 Gates Road, Marlborough | Cheshire | October 27, 2003 (MAR0002) | Built in 1767. |
| Methodist Cemetery | | 10 Lafayette Road, Seabrook | Rockingham | January 30, 2012 (SEA0023) | Also known as Smithtown Cemetery. In use by 1826. |
| Methodist-Episcopal Church | | 38 Hollow Road, Stratford | Coös | April 25, 2011 (STR0017) | |
| Moore-Scott House | | 29 Windham Depot Road, Derry | Rockingham | October 27, 2003 (DER0174) | Built in the early 18th century. |
| Moulton-Greene-Leach House | | 339 Whittier Highway, Moultonborough | Carroll | October 26, 2009 (MOU0002) | Built circa 1840. |
| Moultonborough Town House† | | 951 Whittier Highway, Moultonborough | Carroll | October 25, 2004 (MOU0011) | Built in 1834. Now used by the Moultonborough Historical Society and adjacent to the also-listed Lamprey House. |
| Mt. Forist Grange Cemetery | | East Milan Road, Berlin | Coös | July 25, 2005 (BER0023) | |
| Mt. Washington Cemetery | | Main Street and Prospect Street, Bethlehem | Grafton | July 31, 2006 (BET0017) | The cemetery's earliest graves date to 1795. |
| H.E. Netsch & Sons Blacksmithing | | 344 Second Street, Manchester | Hillsborough | October 30, 2006 (MAN0138) | In operation circa 1930 until 1995. |
| New Castle Congregational Church† | | 65 Main Street, New Castle | Rockingham | July 30, 2007 (NWC0010) | Built in 1828. |
| New England College Covered Bridge | | 7 Main Street, Henniker | Merrimack | January 27, 2003 (HEN0002) | Also known as the Henniker Covered Bridge. Built in 1972, over the Contoocook River. Foot traffic only. |
| New England Masonic Charitable Institute† | | 30 Town House Road, Effingham | Carroll | April 29, 2002 (EFF0001) | Built in 1858; now houses the town's public library. |
| New London Barn Playhouse | | 84 Main Street, New London | Merrimack | January 30, 2006 (NWL0004) | Building dates to circa 1820; has housed summer stock theatre since July 1934. |
| North District School | | 376 Portsmouth Avenue, Greenland | Rockingham | January 30, 2006 (GRL0020) | Opened in 1847; has housed the Greenland Veterans Association since 1938. |
| North Hampton Town Hall† | | 231 Atlantic Avenue, North Hampton | Rockingham | May 1, 2006 (NHA0003) | Built in 1844; the tower has a Paul Revere bell. |
| North Hampton Town Library† | | 237 Atlantic Avenue, North Hampton | Rockingham | April 29, 2013 (NHA0007) | Built in 1907; Tudor Revival architecture. Now houses town offices. |
| George Washington Noyes House† | | 2 Prospect Terrace, Gorham | Coös | April 25, 2016 (GOR0010) | Built in 1893. |
| Odiorne Homestead | | 505 Ocean Boulevard, Rye | Rockingham | July 30, 2007 (RYE0005) | Includes a circa 1800 farmhouse, a barn and a greenhouse. |
| Old Meeting House† | | 27 Fremont Road, Sandown | Rockingham | January 24, 2011 (SND0001) | Built in 1773. |
| Odd Fellows Hall / Old Town Hall | | 1800 Route 140, Gilmanton | Belknap | January 24, 2011 (GLM0018) | Built in 1902–1903. |
| Old Thornton Town Hall | | 2129 Route 175, Thornton | Grafton | October 26, 2009 (THO0002) | Built in 1789; renovated in 1861. |
| Old Town Hall | | 310 Main Street, Salem | Rockingham | July 27, 2009 (SAL0053) | |
| Ossipee Mountain Grange | | 3 Pork Hill Road, Ossipee | Carroll | April 25, 2011 (OSS0014) | Built in 1904. |
| Oyster River Dam | | Newmarket Road, Durham | Strafford | January 27, 2014 (UNKNOWN) | Also known as the Mill Pond Dam. Dates to 1913. |
| W. F. Palmer Place | | 75–76 Palmer Hill Road, Sandwich | Carroll | January 30, 2012 (SWH0011) | The owner ran a feed and grain store, later a general store, at this farm house and barn. |
| Pawtuckaway CCC Camp Recreation Hall | | Stage Road, Deerfield | Rockingham | May 1, 2006 (DEE0002) | Marked by New Hampshire Historical Marker No. 214. |
| Pelham Library and Memorial Building† | | 5 Main Street, Pelham | Hillsborough | July 28, 2008 (PEL0011) | Built in 1895. |
| Penacook Academy | | 116 North Main Street, Boscawen | Merrimack | April 29, 2002 (BOS0005) | Building is now the Boscawen Municipal Facility. |
| People's Baptist Church† | | 45 Pearl Street, Portsmouth | Rockingham | January 28, 2002 (POR0008) | Originally built in 1857; enlarged in 1868. |
| James M. Perkins House | | 70 Lower Main Street, Sunapee | Sullivan | October 27, 2008 (SUN0003) | Second Empire style, built in 1890. |
| Norman and Marion Perry House† | | 352 Ellsworth Hill Road, Campton | Grafton | April 25, 2011 (UNKNOWN) | Modernist architecture residence built in 1960. |
| Peterborough Town Library | | 2 Concord Street, Peterborough | Hillsborough | October 30, 2006 (PET0023) | Designed by George S. Morison in 1892; built in 1893. A portico was added in 1914. |
| The Pinnacle | | 18 Pinnacle Street, Hooksett | Merrimack | July 25, 2011 (UNKNOWN) | Rocky hill overlooking the Merrimack River; photo shows view of the river and village from The Pinnacle. |
| Pittsburg Town Hall | | 1525 Main Street, Pittsburg | Coös | July 29, 2019 (PIT0013) | Built in 1883. |
| Portsmouth Marine Railway | | 105 Marcy Street, Portsmouth | Rockingham | October 30, 2006 (POR0113) | In operation from 1833 to 1855. Now houses The Players' Ring Theatre. |
| Arah W. Prescott Library | | 16 Main Street, Hooksett | Merrimack | January 28, 2008 (HOK0018) | Built in 1910. |
| Province Road Meeting House | | 251 Province Road, Belmont | Belknap | January 27, 2003 (BEL0058) | |
| Eugene and Marie Quirin House | | 250 Coolidge Avenue, Manchester | Hillsborough | May 1, 2006 (MAN0139) | Built in 1906; Queen Anne style. Has been a funeral home since the 1950s. |
| Randall Farm | | 11 Randall Road, Lee | Strafford | January 27, 2003 (LEE0001) | |
| Randolph Church | | 34 U.S. Route 2, Randolph | Coös | January 30, 2006 (RAN0002) | Built in 1884. |
| Ray Farm | | 38 Ray Road, Hillsborough | Hillsborough | July 28, 2003 (HIL0003) | Late 18th century farmstead on 130 acres (53 ha). |
| Horace Richards House | | 3 Lamson Avenue, Goffstown | Hillsborough | January 27, 2003 (GOF0001) | Also known as Aiken Academy. |
| Robie's Country Store† | | 9 Riverside Street, Hooksett | Merrimack | July 29, 2002 (HOK0002) | In operation from 1822 to 1997. |
| Rochester Commons Bandstand | | Grant Street, Rochester | Strafford | October 25, 2001 (ROC0016) | |
| Rolfe Family Historic District‡ | | 16 Penacook Street, Concord | Merrimack | July 28, 2003 (CON0256) | First listed as Nathaniel Rolfe Barn on July 28, 2003; enlarged to Rolfe Homestead on October 31, 2005; enlarged to Rolfe Family Historic District on April 28, 2008. |
| Roller Shed | | Old Portland Road, Freedom | Carroll | July 30, 2012 (FRE0008) | Built in 1901 to house the town's road-grading equipment. |
| Rossview Farm | | 84 District 5 Road, Concord | Merrimack | April 25, 2005 (CON0145) | |
| Benjamin Rowe House† | | 88 Belknap Mountain Road, Gilford | Belknap | January 27, 2003 (GLF0045) | Built circa 1835. |
| Roy House | | 9–11 Orchard Avenue, Nashua | Hillsborough | July 25, 2011 (NAS0233) | Built in 1915. |
| Rumford House | | 913 South Main Street, Franklin | Merrimack | April 25, 2011 (FRA0028) | Built c. 1732 in Concord, moved to Franklin in 1925. |
| Rye Town Hall† | | 10 Central Road, Rye | Rockingham | April 29, 2013 (RYE0016) | Built in 1839 as a church; purchased by the town in 1873. |
| St. Kieran's Parish Church | | 155 Emery Street, Berlin | Coös | October 28, 2002 (BER0014) | Now houses the St. Kieran Community Center for the Arts. |
| Salem Depot | | 81 Main Street, Salem | Rockingham | April 25, 2011 (SAL0039) | Built in 1867. |
| Sanborn Mills | | 7097 Sanborn Road, Loudon | Merrimack | October 27, 2003 (LOU0002) | Saw mill dates to 1829; grist mill dates to 1830. |
| Sandown Depot Railroad Station† | | 6 Depot Road, Sandown | Rockingham | April 25, 2011 (SND0002) | Built in 1873–74. |
| Sawyer Tavern† | | 63 Arch Street, Keene | Cheshire | October 29, 2007 (KEE0194) | Built circa 1803–06. |
| Sellin Farm | | 305 Gilmanton Road, Barnstead | Belknap | January 27, 2003 (BAR0005) | |
| Shaw Warehouse | | Marcy Street, Portsmouth | Rockingham | October 24, 2011 (POR0128) | Built in 1806. |
| Sheafe Warehouse | | 107 Marcy Street, Portsmouth | Rockingham | October 24, 2011 (POR0127) | Built circa 1720. Moved to Prescott Park in 1940. |
| Shedd Free Library | | 46 North Main Street, Washington | Sullivan | April 30, 2007 (WAS0002) | Built in 1881. |
| Shedd-Porter Memorial Library† | | 3 Main Street, Alstead | Cheshire | January 24, 2011 (ALS0048) | Built in 1910. |
| Simon's Store | | 3 North Stark Highway, Weare | Hillsborough | January 30, 2006 (WEA0011) | |
| Simonds Rock | | off Al Paul Lane, Merrimack | Hillsborough | July 30, 2007 (MER0019) | Second-largest boulder in the state, surpassed only by the Madison Boulder. |
| Smith Chapel† | | 45 Mill Pond Road, Durham | Strafford | April 29, 2013 (DUR0023) | Built in 1900. |
| Jeremiah Smith Grange #161 | | 1 Lee Hook Road, Lee | Strafford | October 26, 2009 (LEE0006) | Organized as a Grange in 1891—the building had previously been a Baptist church—and was named after Jeremiah Smith (1837–1921), son of Jeremiah Smith (1759–1842), 6th Governor of New Hampshire. |
| Daniel Smith Tavern | | 112 Main Street, New Hampton | Belknap | July 28, 2003 (NWH0002) | In use from 1805 to the 1920s. |
| Smyth Library† | | 194 High Street, Candia | Rockingham | April 30, 2007 (CND0005) | Built in 1932. |
| Spinney Meeting House | | 1847 Lovell Lake Road, Wakefield | Carroll | October 31, 2005 (WAK0002) | Built circa 1831 and rebuilt in 1876. |
| Stanley Tavern† | | 371 Main Street, Hopkinton | Merrimack | January 28, 2002 (HOP0002) | Built circa 1791. |
| Molly Stark House | | 346 Stark Highway North, Dunbarton | Merrimack | January 27, 2003 (DUN0001) | Also known as the Capt. Caleb Page House. |
| Stark Park† | | River Road at Park Avenue, Manchester | Hillsborough | July 19, 2010 (MAN0481) | Opened in 1893. |
| Stoddard Town Hall | | 1450 Route 123 N, Stoddard | Cheshire | January 26, 2009 (STO0003) | Built in 1868. |
| Stone Arch Bridge† | | Cheshire Railroad over The Branch river, Keene | Cheshire | October 30, 2006 (KEE0182) | Built in 1847. Now carries a multi-purpose rail trail. |
| Stone Homestead | | 723 Old Homestead Highway, Swanzey | Cheshire | July 31, 2006 (SWA0016) | Built circa 1791. |
| Stone Memorial Building | | 4 North Stark Highway, Weare | Hillsborough | October 29, 2007 (WEA0005) | Built in 1896, designed by William M. Butterfield. |
| Sunapee Harbor House Livery Stable | | 58 Main Street, Sunapee | Sullivan | October 27, 2008 (SUN0004) | Also known as the Old Town Hall; built circa 1889. |
| Sugar Hill Meetinghouse | | Route 117, Sugar Hill | Grafton | January 27, 2003 (SUG0002) | |
| Sunapee Mountain Grange #144 | | 49 North Mill Village Road, Goshen | Sullivan | April 28, 2003 (GOS0001) | Built in 1853. |
| Temple Town Hall† | | Main Street, Temple | Hillsborough | April 30, 2007 (TEM0001) | Built in 1842 as a church. Sold to a local grange in 1875. Purchased by the town in 1889. |
| Thayer Public Library | | 3 Main Street, Ashuelot, Winchester | Cheshire | April 27, 2009 (WIN0018) | Built in 1823 as a private residence; renovated as a library in 1902. Located in Ashuelot village in the town of Winchester. |
| Thomas Farm | | 120 Thomas Road, Rindge | Cheshire | April 28, 2008 (RIN0011) | 130 acres (53 ha), including houses built in 1771 and 1839. |
| Union Chapel† | | 220 Sawmill Road, Hillsborough | Hillsborough | July 31, 2006 (HIL0016) | Built in 1887. |
| Union Meetinghouse | | 24 Belknap Mountain Road, Gilford | Belknap | April 28, 2003 (GLF0028) | Built in 1834. |
| Universalist Chapel† | | 3 Second New Hampshire Turnpike, Lempster | Sullivan | January 30, 2006 (LEM0002) | Built in 1845. Now the Miner Memorial Library, located in the village center of East Lempster. |
| Upper Village Hall | | 52 Hampstead Road, Derry | Rockingham | October 27, 2008 (DER0182) | Built in 1875. |
| Valley Cemetery† | | Pine and Auburn Streets, Manchester | Hillsborough | April 28, 2003 (MAN0032) | Dates to 1841. |
| Wagon Hill Farm | | Piscataqua Road, Durham | Strafford | January 2020 (TBA) | Farmhouse built circa 1804; 139 acres (56 ha). |
| Wakefield Town Hall† | | 2 High Street, Wakefield | Carroll | July 29, 2002 (WAK0001) | Built in 1895. |
| Waumbek Cottages Historic District† | | Jefferson | Coös | October 31, 2005 (JEF0011–0016) | Six cottages: Bashaba (14 Starr King Road), Beit-el-Hakeen / The Birches (25 Cottage Road), Onaway (18 Cottage Road), The Bungalow (38 Starr King Road), Wayonda (36 Cottage Road), and Wyndybrae (13 Cottage Road). |
| Weare Free Library | | 10 Page Memorial Lane, Weare | Hillsborough | October 25, 2010 (WEA0019) | Built in 1926. |
| Lee Webster Place | | 14 Mountain Road, Sandwich | Carroll | April 25, 2011 (SWH0009) | |
| Webster Stagecoach Stop and Store | | 1 Sandown Road, Danville | Rockingham | July 31, 2006 (DAN0005) | Marked by New Hampshire Historical Marker No. 258. Was moved across NH 111A in 2008 and restored by the town's Heritage Commission. |
| Governor Wentworth State Historic Site | | 56 Wentworth Farm Road, Wolfeboro | Carroll | July 30, 2007 (WOL0025) | Former estate of New Hampshire's second Royal Governor, John Wentworth. |
| West Street Mill Building | | Castle Street, Keene | Cheshire | April 29, 2002 (KEE0010) | Formerly 272 West Street. See also Island Street Mill Building. |
| Westmoreland Town Hall | | 780 Route 63, Westmoreland | Cheshire | October 25, 2010 (WES0007) | Built in 1916–1917. |
| Whipple House | | 75 Summer Street, Bristol | Grafton | April 25, 2005 (BRI0031) | Built in 1904; has operated as a bed and breakfast since 1985. |
| George A. and Emma B. Wiggin Memorial Library† | | 158 Portsmouth Avenue, Stratham | Rockingham | April 30, 2012 (STM0027) | Designed by Charles Howard Walker and built in 1912; now houses the Stratham Historical Society. |
| Wiggin-Raynes Barn | | 61 Newfields Road, Exeter | Rockingham | October 30, 2017 (EXE0002) | Pre-Civil War 95-by-42-foot (29 by 13 m) barn. |
| Winter Street Cemetery | | Winter Street, Exeter | Rockingham | April 30, 2012 (EXE0042) | Served as Exeter's burial ground from 1743 to 1850. |

† Property is also listed in the National Register of Historic Places.
‡ Property is a subset or superset of a listing in the National Register of Historic Places.

== See also ==
- National Register of Historic Places listings in New Hampshire
- List of National Historic Landmarks in New Hampshire
