= High Tops School =

- U.S. National Register of Historic Places
- NH State Register of Historic Places
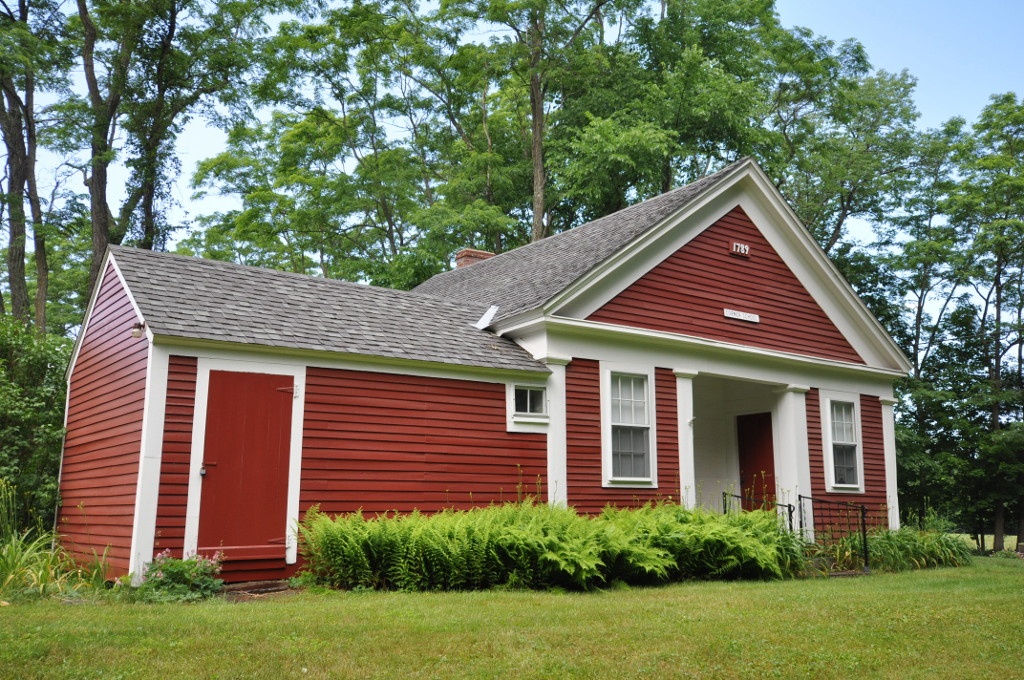
- 2016 photo

- Location within New Hampshire Location within the United States
- Location: Reynolds and River Rds., Westmoreland, New Hampshire
- Coordinates: 42°57′45″N 72°29′13″W
- Area: 0.3 acres (0.12 ha)
- Built: 1789
- Architectural style: Greek Revival
- NRHP reference No.: 84000519

Significant dates
- Added to NRHP: December 13, 1984
- Designated NHSRHP: January 29, 2007

The High Tops School, also known as Schoolhouse No. 9, is a historic school building at the corner of Reynolds and River roads in Westmoreland, New Hampshire. Built in 1789 and remodeled in 1846, it is one of a small number of district schoolhouses in the region to survive demolition or adaptation to residential use. The building was listed on the National Register of Historic Places in 1984, and the New Hampshire State Register of Historic Places in 2007. It is now owned by the Westmoreland Park Hill Meeting House and Historical Society.

== Description and history ==
The High Tops School is located in a rural setting of western Westmoreland, on the south side of the multijunction meeting of River Road, Reynolds Road, and Poocham Road. It is a 1 1/2-story wood-frame structure, with a gabled roof and clapboarded exterior. Its main facade has the appearance of a Greek temple, with four pilasters supporting a projecting architrave and triangular pediment. The main entrance is in a recessed area between the middle two pilasters. The interior walls are finished in pine, while the floors are oak replacements for original pine. It retains blackboards and other fixtures dating to its mid-19th century remodeling.

The building was constructed in 1789, and was moved to its present location in 1846. At that time it was restyled to give its Greek Revival appearance, which was then enjoying significant popularity in the region. This work was done as part of a broad movement to improve both the location and condition of district schools throughout the state. It is one of few regional schoolhouses of the period to escape extensive later alteration.

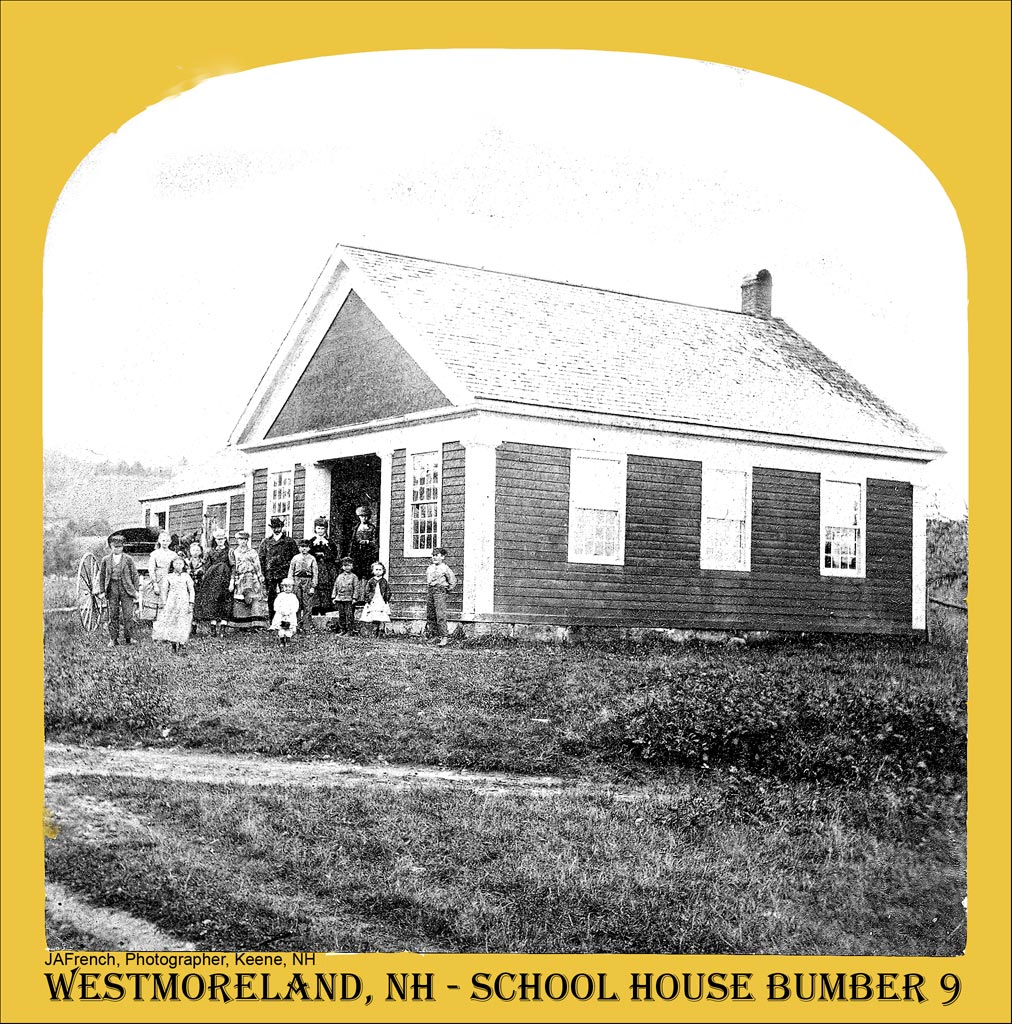
An historic view of the school

== See also ==
- National Register of Historic Places listings in Cheshire County, New Hampshire
