= Sawyer Tavern =

Historic tavern in New Hampshire, United States

- U.S. National Register of Historic Places
- NH State Register of Historic Places
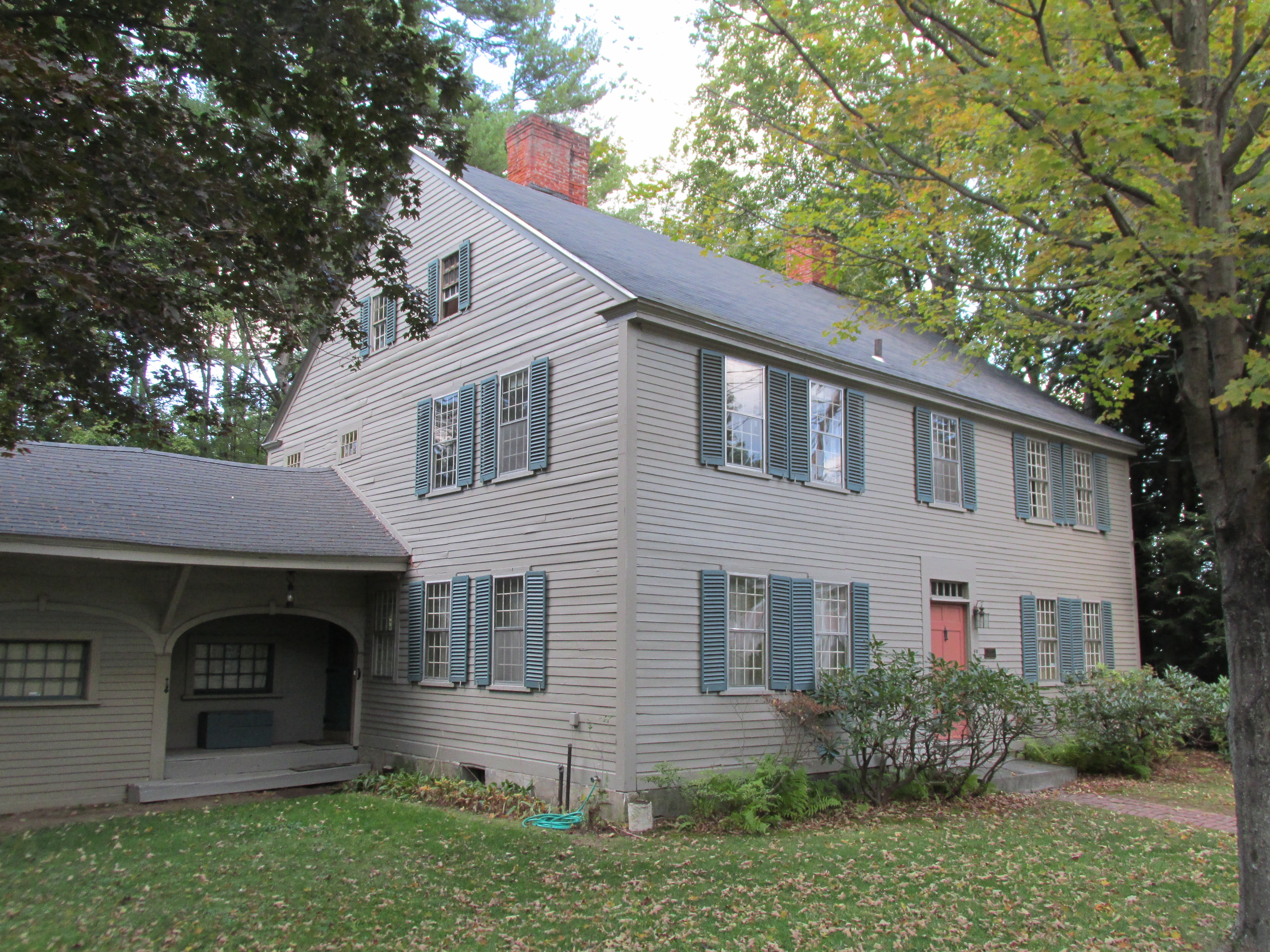

- Location within New Hampshire Location within the United States
- Location: 63 Arch St., Keene, New Hampshire
- Coordinates: 42°56′21″N 72°19′0″W
- Area: 1.1 acres (0.45 ha)
- Built: 1803
- Architect: Wheeler, Abraham, Jr.; Hobart, Peter
- NRHP reference No.: 80000280

Significant dates
- Added to NRHP: May 15, 1980
- Designated NHSRHP: October 29, 2007

The Sawyer Tavern is a historic building at 63 Arch Street in Keene, New Hampshire. Probably built c. 1803–06, it was long a neighborhood landmark, serving as a tavern and then inn and restaurant for parts of the 19th and 20th centuries. The building is now in residential use. It was listed on the National Register of Historic Places in 1980, and the New Hampshire State Register of Historic Places in 2007.

== Description and history ==
The Sawyer Tavern is located in western Keene, on the north side of Arch Street a short way west of Keene High School. It is a 2 1/2-story wood-frame structure, with a gabled roof, two interior chimneys, and a clapboarded exterior. Its main facade is five bays wide, with a symmetrical arrangement of sash windows around the center entrance. The entrance is simply framed, with a four-light transom window above. Extending to the left of the main block is a long single-story ell, which historically housed the tavern's summer kitchen and some horse sheds. A smaller ell, possibly of older construction than the main block, extends to the rear. The interior retains a number of original features, including inside shutters on some windows, but the second-floor ballroom has been partitioned into bedrooms.

This landmark building was built no later than 1803–06, and has a long record as a tavern and inn in West Keene. Although it is now filled with private residences, it served in both the 19th and 20th centuries as a tavern. It was built by Abraham Wheeler, Jr., a veteran of the American Revolutionary War, and was originally known by his name. His son-in-law Josiah Sawyer later took over the business, and it was subsequently run by his two spinster daughters. The building was used as a tavern until 1883, and was sold out of the family in 1922. It was then operated as a restaurant and tea room until 1950.

== See also ==
- National Register of Historic Places listings in Cheshire County, New Hampshire
