= Indian Stream Schoolhouse =

- U.S. National Register of Historic Places
- NH State Register of Historic Places
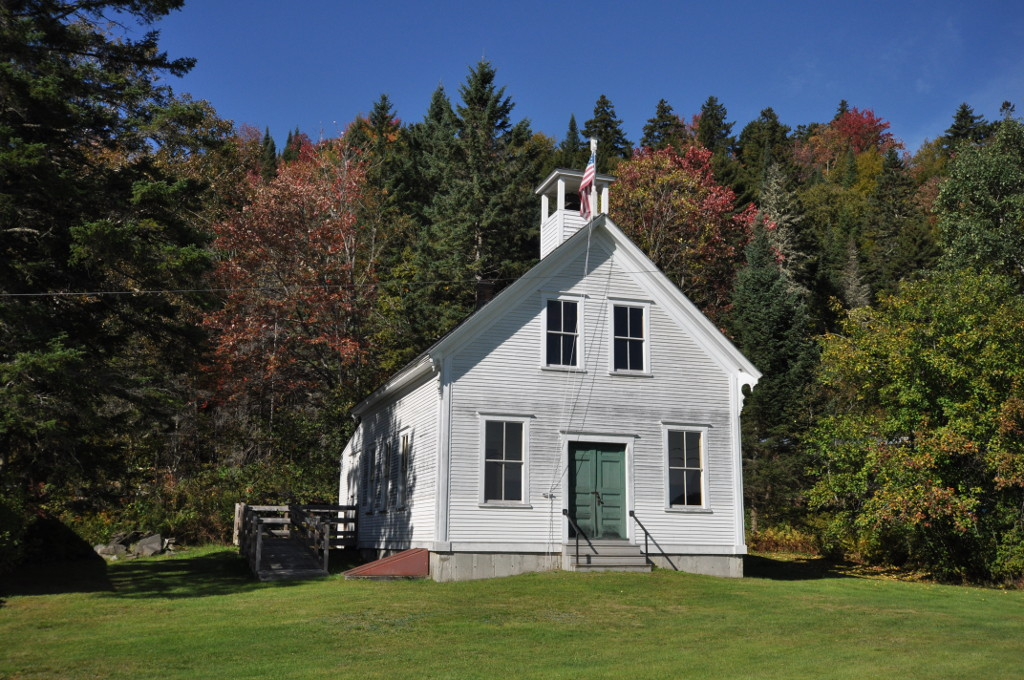

- Location within New Hampshire Location within the United States
- Location: Tabor Rd., Pittsburg, New Hampshire
- Coordinates: 45°02′47″N 71°26′39″W
- Built: 1897
- NRHP reference No.: 11000730

Significant dates
- Added to NRHP: October 11, 2011
- Designated NHSRHP: October 29, 2007

The Indian Stream Schoolhouse is a historic school building on Tabor Road in Pittsburg, New Hampshire. Built in 1897, it is one of the town's few surviving 19th-century district schoolhouses. It was listed on the U.S. National Register of Historic Places in 2011, and the New Hampshire State Register of Historic Places in 2007. It presently serves as a local history museum, open for tours by appointment.

== Description and history ==
The Indian Stream Schoolhouse stands in southern Pittsburg, on the west side of Tabor Road, just west of its junction with United States Route 3, amid a small cluster of houses. The eponymous Indian Stream flows south toward the Connecticut River a short way to the east. The school is a 1-1/2 story wood frame structure, with a gabled roof and clapboarded exterior. Its roof is topped by a small square open belfry. The main facade is symmetrical, with a center entrance flanked by sash windows with shallow corniced lintels. A pair of similar windows appear in the attic level. The building corners have pilaster-like raised corner boards, and there are decorative jigsawn brackets at the corners of the eaves.

The schoolhouse was built in 1897 and operated as a school until 1939. It was originally built and furnished for just a few hundred dollars, and was one of nine district schools in the town in 1900. After it closed, it stood vacant and fell into disrepair until the early 21st century. The schoolhouse was restored by a group of former students and other community members, and still includes many of the original furnishings. Financial records from its early years still exist, such as documentation for $12 paid on June 30, 1908 for painting the schoolhouse.

== See also ==
- National Register of Historic Places listings in Coos County, New Hampshire
