= Benjamin Aldrich Homestead =

Historic house in New Hampshire, United States

- U.S. National Register of Historic Places
- NH State Register of Historic Places
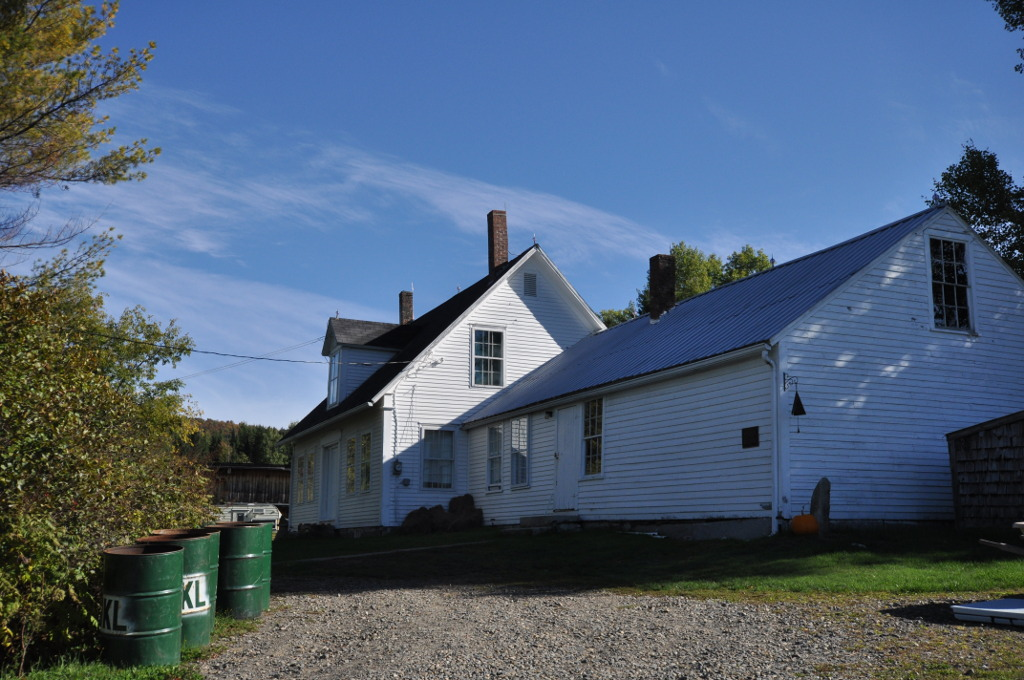

- Location within New Hampshire Location within the United States
- Location: Shaw Rd., 0.46 E of Piper Hill, Colebrook, New Hampshire
- Coordinates: 44°55′39.5″N 71°29′0″W
- Area: 136 acres (55 ha)
- Built: 1846
- Architectural style: Greek Revival
- NRHP reference No.: 03000109

Significant dates
- Added to NRHP: March 11, 2003
- Designated NHSRHP: October 28, 2002

The Benjamin Aldrich Homestead is a historic homestead east of the terminus of Aldrich Road, slightly east of Piper Hill in Colebrook, New Hampshire. Developed beginning in 1846, it is the oldest surviving farm property in the town. Its farmstead includes the original 1846 house and barns of the period. It was listed on the National Register of Historic Places in 2003, and the New Hampshire State Register of Historic Places in 2002.

== Description and history ==
The Benjamin Aldrich Homestead stands in a rural area of northwestern Colebrook, on a hillside of 136 acres (55 ha) overlooking the Connecticut River to the west. The farmstead includes the main house, several barns, a chicken coop, and other storage buildings. The main block of the house is a 2 1/2-story wood-frame structure, with a gabled roof, granite stone foundation, and Greek Revival decoration. Attached to it is an older 1 1/2-story Cape, which is now serving as an ell on the south side. The main barn, built about the same time as the ell, is a bank barn with a fieldstone foundation and hand-hewn timber frame.

The ell of the house and the barn were built in 1846 and 1847, respectively, not long after Benjamin Aldrich's purchase of the land in 1844. In 1861, the main block of the house was built, and the old house rotated and attached to its south side. The farm is the last intact 19th-century farmstead in the town of Colebrook. It remained in the hands of Aldrich's descendants until 1988, seeing agricultural use well into the 20th century. Originally a largely agrarian community, Colebrook has no active farm properties.

== See also ==
- National Register of Historic Places listings in Coos County, New Hampshire
