= Robie's Country Store =

- U.S. National Register of Historic Places
- NH State Register of Historic Places
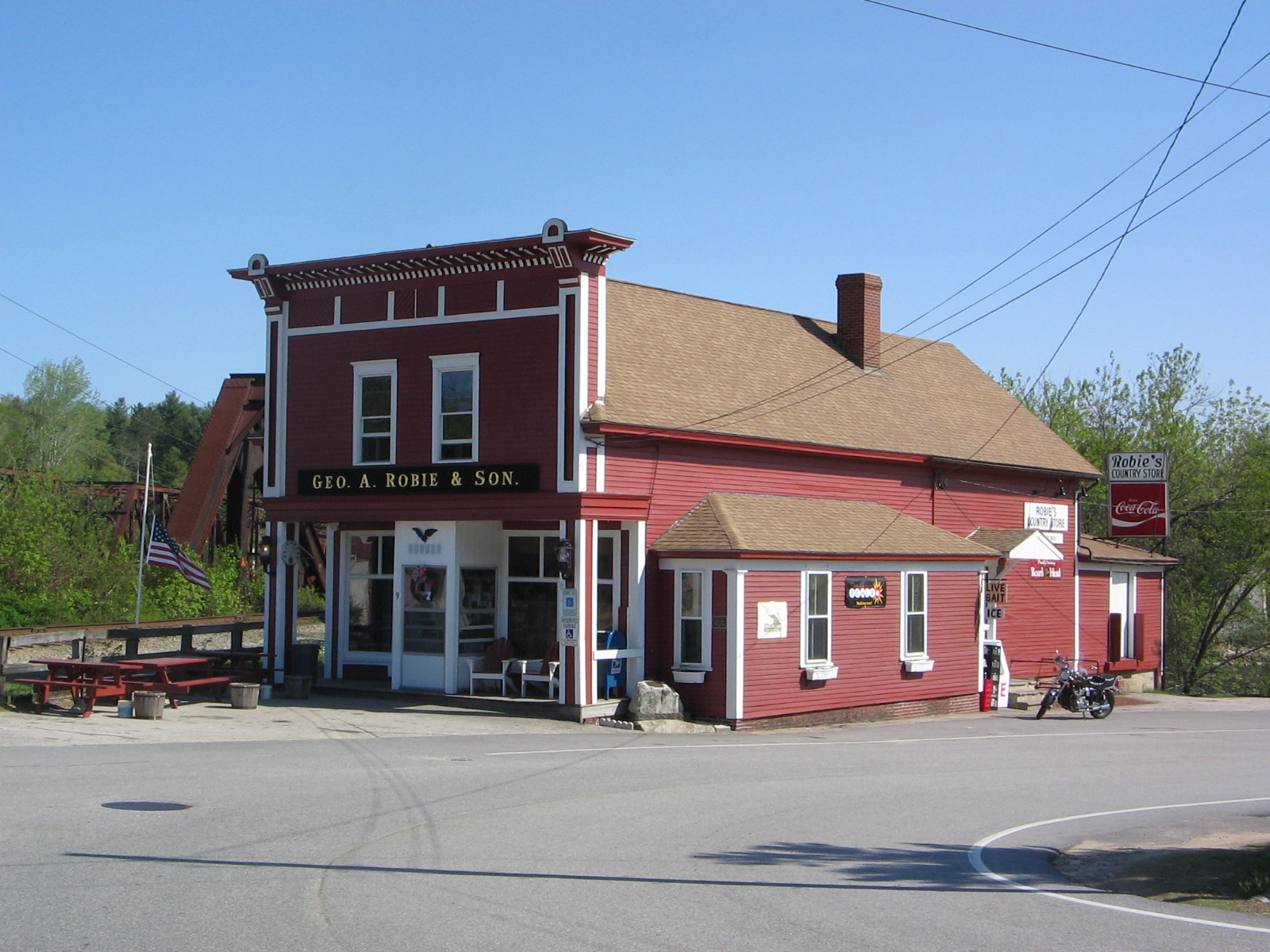

- Location within New Hampshire Location within the United States
- Location: 9 Riverside St., Hooksett, New Hampshire
- Coordinates: 43°5′52″N 71°27′59″W
- Area: less than one acre
- Built: 1907
- Architectural style: Italianate, Boomtown commercial
- NRHP reference No.: 00001038

Significant dates
- Added to NRHP: August 31, 2000
- Designated NHSRHP: July 29, 2002

Robie's Country Store was a historic store at 9 Riverside Street in Hooksett, New Hampshire, United States. As a business, the general store was in continuous operation between 1822 and 1997, the last 110 years under the ownership of the Robie family from 1887, from whence it gets its name. The current building, constructed in 1906 following a fire, is a rare regional example of a store with a "boomtown" facade. It has been a political stop for presidential candidates since the early 1950s. Robie's Country Store was added to the National Register of Historic Places in 2000, and the New Hampshire State Register of Historic Places in 2002. In August 2026, the store permanently closed.

== Description ==
Robie's is located in the village center of Hooksett, on a parcel bounded on the south by the Merrimack River, the east by a railroad right of way, and the north by Riverside Street. It is a 1 1/2-story wood-frame structure, with a gabled roof obscured on the front by a two-story facade. The facade has elaborate Italianate features, including paneled corner pilasters and a projecting cornice with a dentil course and modillion blocks.

== History ==
A general store was established on this site in 1822, the year Hooksett was incorporated. The shop flourished at least in part due to its location: close to road and river in the early years, and also later close to textile mills and railroad traffic. The original building had a dock and received river barge merchandise until the railroad arrived in 1842.

The first building on the site burned in 1857, was rebuilt, burned again in 1906, and was again rebuilt. George A. Robie bought the store in 1887, and over the next 110 years it was passed down from father to son. It provided Hooksett with food and supplies and doubled as the town's post office. The Postal Service still maintains a cluster of mailboxes inside the store for 26 customers. The building and its historical pieces were purchased by the Robie's Country Store Preservation Corp. after the retirement of Lloyd Robie in 1997. The store operated under lease agreement.

In August 2026, the store permanently closed, the Robie Farm in Piermont will remain open.

== See also ==
- National Register of Historic Places listings in Merrimack County, New Hampshire
