= Benjamin Rowe House =

Historic house in New Hampshire, United States

- U.S. National Register of Historic Places
- NH State Register of Historic Places
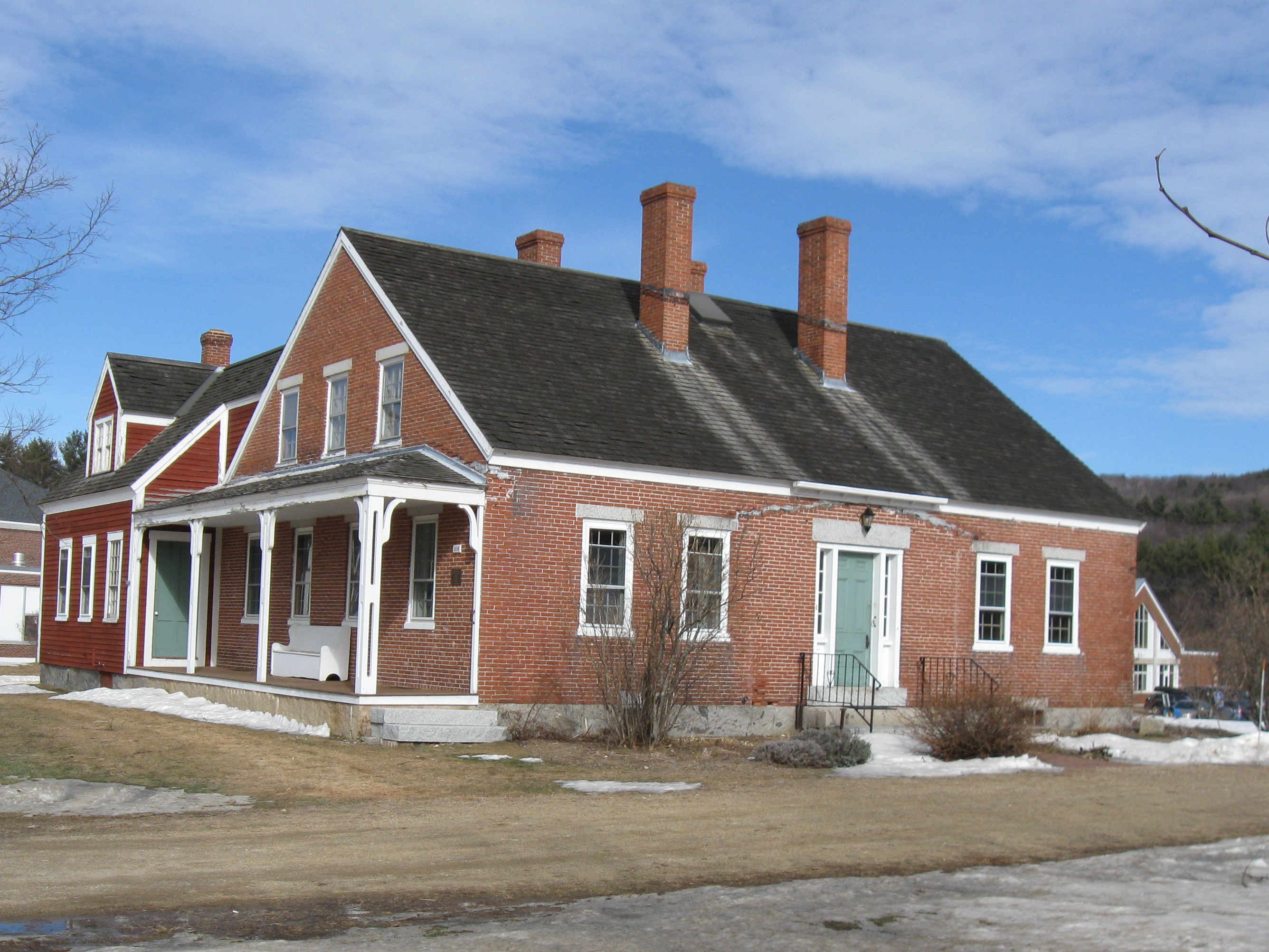

- Location within New Hampshire Location within the United States
- Location: 88 Belknap Mountain Rd., Gilford, New Hampshire
- Coordinates: 43°32′37″N 71°24′10″W
- Area: less than one acre
- Built: 1835
- Built by: Benjamin Rowe
- Architectural style: Greek Revival, Federal
- NRHP reference No.: 07000552

Significant dates
- Added to NRHP: April 30, 2008
- Designated NHSRHP: January 27, 2003

The Benjamin Rowe House is a historic house museum at 88 Belknap Mountain Road in Gilford, New Hampshire. Probably built in the 1830s, it is one of the town's best-preserved period houses. The house was listed on the National Register of Historic Places in 2008, and the New Hampshire State Register of Historic Places in 2003.

== Description and history ==
The Benjamin Rowe House stands at the southern edge of Gilford's town center, on the east side of Belknap Mountain Road. It is located within a loop of the access road for the Gilford Elementary School, and is oriented with its main facade to the south and a side gable to the street. It is a single-story Cape style house built of brick, with a wood-frame ell to the rear. It is five bays wide and four deep, with a central entrance flanked by sidelight windows and topped by a granite lintel. Four slender chimneys pierce the brick roof. A wood-frame ell extends to the north, and a hip-roof porch with bracketed posts is on the street side. The interior retains original 19th-century woodwork and hardware, including fireplace surrounds, doors, and door latches.

The house was probably built in the 1830s, and remains one of the town's best-preserved 19th-century Cape style houses. It underwent a number of alterations, particularly in the early 20th century when the property was in active use as a dairy farm, but these were removed when the building underwent a comprehensive restoration to its original 19th-century appearance in the 1990s. The town purchased the farm in 1970, and briefly housed town offices in the house during the 1980s. It now houses a local history museum.

== See also ==
- National Register of Historic Places listings in Belknap County, New Hampshire
