= Noah Cooke House =

Historic house in New Hampshire, United States

- U.S. National Register of Historic Places
- NH State Register of Historic Places
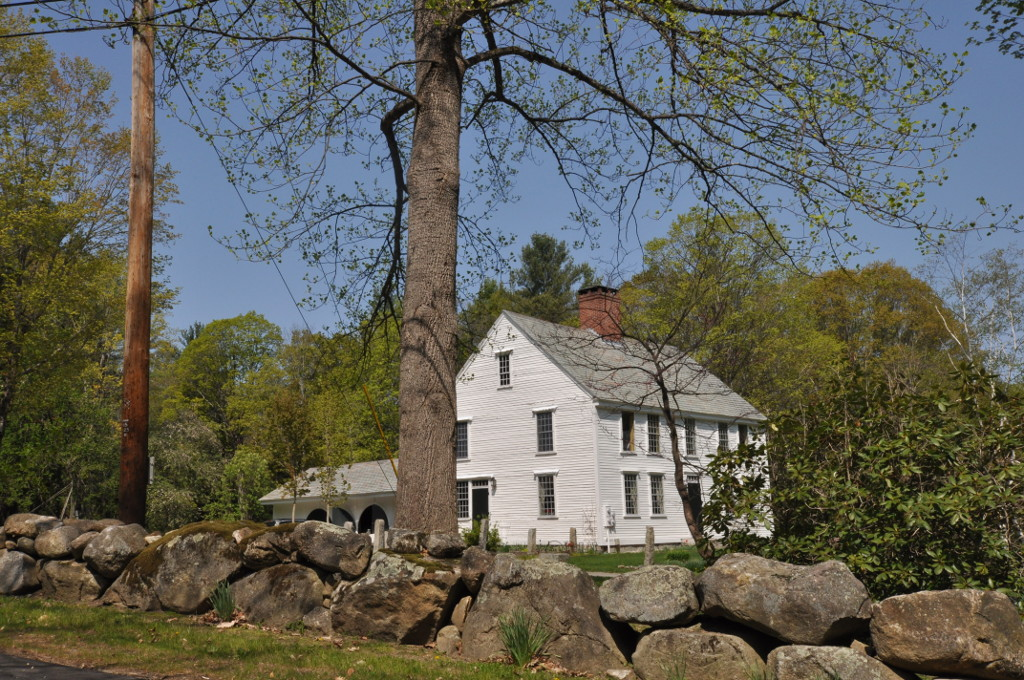

- Location within New Hampshire Location within the United States
- Location: Daniels Hill Road, Keene, New Hampshire
- Coordinates: 42°55′29″N 72°20′22″W
- Area: 18 acres (7.3 ha)
- Built: 1791
- Architectural style: Federal
- NRHP reference No.: 73000268

Significant dates
- Added to NRHP: April 23, 1973
- Designated NHSRHP: July 29, 2002

The Noah Cooke House is a historic house on Daniels Hill Road in Keene, New Hampshire. Built in 1791, this saltbox colonial is one of Keene's oldest surviving buildings, and a good example of Georgian residential architecture. The house was originally located on Main Street, but was moved to its present rural setting in 1973. It was listed on the National Register of Historic Places in 1973, and the New Hampshire State Register of Historic Places in 2002.

== Description and history ==
The Noah Cooke House stands in a remote and wooded area of western Keene, on the north side of Daniels Hill Road. It is a 2 1/2-story wood-frame structure, with a gabled roof, central chimney, and clapboarded exterior. Its main facade is five bays wide, with sash windows arranged symmetrically around a center entrance. The entrance is framed by simple moulding and topped by a transom window and cornice. The interior retains many period finishes, including paneled fireplace surrounds, plaster wainscoting, and a winding front staircase.

The house was built in 1791, although it is connected to an ell of older construction, appearing to date to c. 1770. Originally located on Main Street, it was built for Noah Cooke, a prominent local lawyer who served as town clerk and underwrote the town's first fire company. It was purchased in 1906 by Horatio Colony, a prominent local businessman, and remained in his family until 1966. Threatened with demolition, it was moved to its present site in October 1973.

== See also ==
- National Register of Historic Places listings in Cheshire County, New Hampshire
