= Waumbek Cottages Historic District =

Historic district in New Hampshire, United States

- U.S. National Register of Historic Places
- U.S. Historic district
- NH State Register of Historic Places
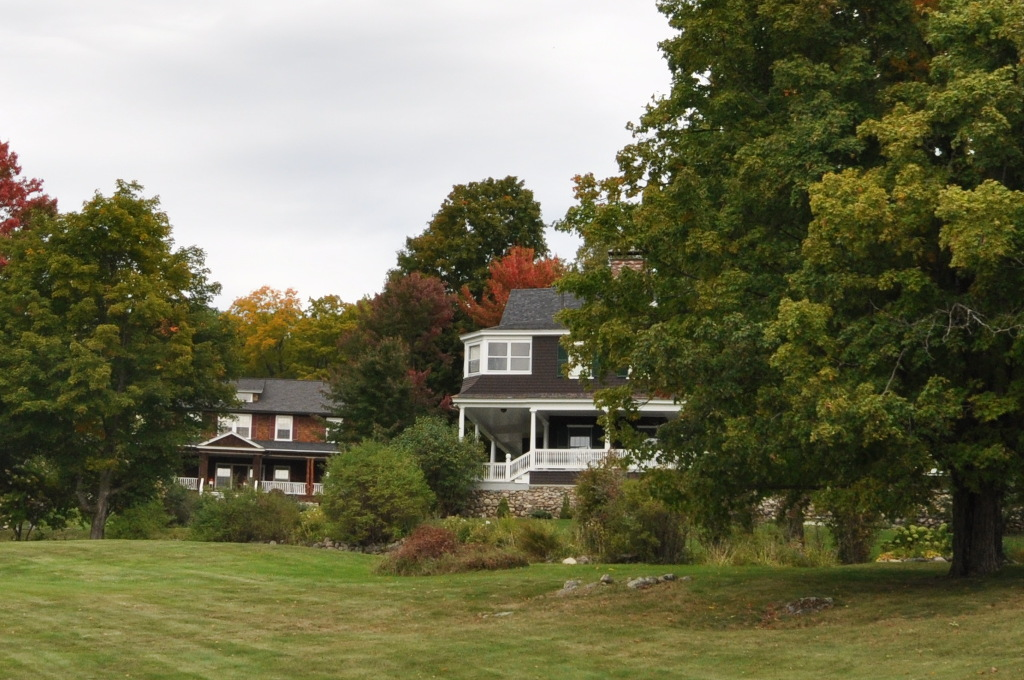
- Two of the Waumbek Cottages

- Location within New Hampshire Location within the United States
- Location: 13, 18, 25, 36 Cottage Rd.; 14, 38 Starr King Rd., Jefferson, New Hampshire
- Coordinates: 44°25′1″N 71°28′8″W
- Area: 11 acres (4.5 ha)
- Built: 1894
- Architectural style: Shingle Style
- NRHP reference No.: 06000142

Significant dates
- Added to NRHP: March 15, 2006
- Designated NHSRHP: October 31, 2005

The Waumbek Cottages Historic District encompasses a collection of high-quality summer resort houses in Jefferson, New Hampshire. Located on Cottage Road and Starr King Road, these six "cottages" are all that survive of a large late-19th century resort complex that once included a hotel and eleven cottages. All are fine examples of Shingle style architecture, with Queen Anne style touches. The district was listed in the National Register of Historic Places in 2006, and the six cottages were individually listed in the New Hampshire State Register of Historic Places in 2005.

== Description and history ==
The town of Jefferson, founded in 1796, became recognized as a tourist destination in the mid-19th century, in part through the writings of Unitarian minister Thomas Starr King. He convinced a local hotelier to build a larger hotel, called the Hotel Waumbek, in 1860. The availability of railroad transportation greatly increased the tourist trade in subsequent decades, and the hotel was repeatedly enlarged. By the 1890s it was one of the state's grand hotels, with 500 rooms.

During the 1880s, a trend began in these resort properties to build separate houses for some of the hotel guests, and other long-time guests also purchased adjacent properties from real estate promoters to build their own, while taking advantage of the hotel's amenities. At the Hotel Waumbek, these trends resulted in the construction of eleven separate "cottages" near the hotel between 1889 and 1900. A major fire in 1928 destroyed the hotel and three cottages, two more were demolished later in the 20th century.

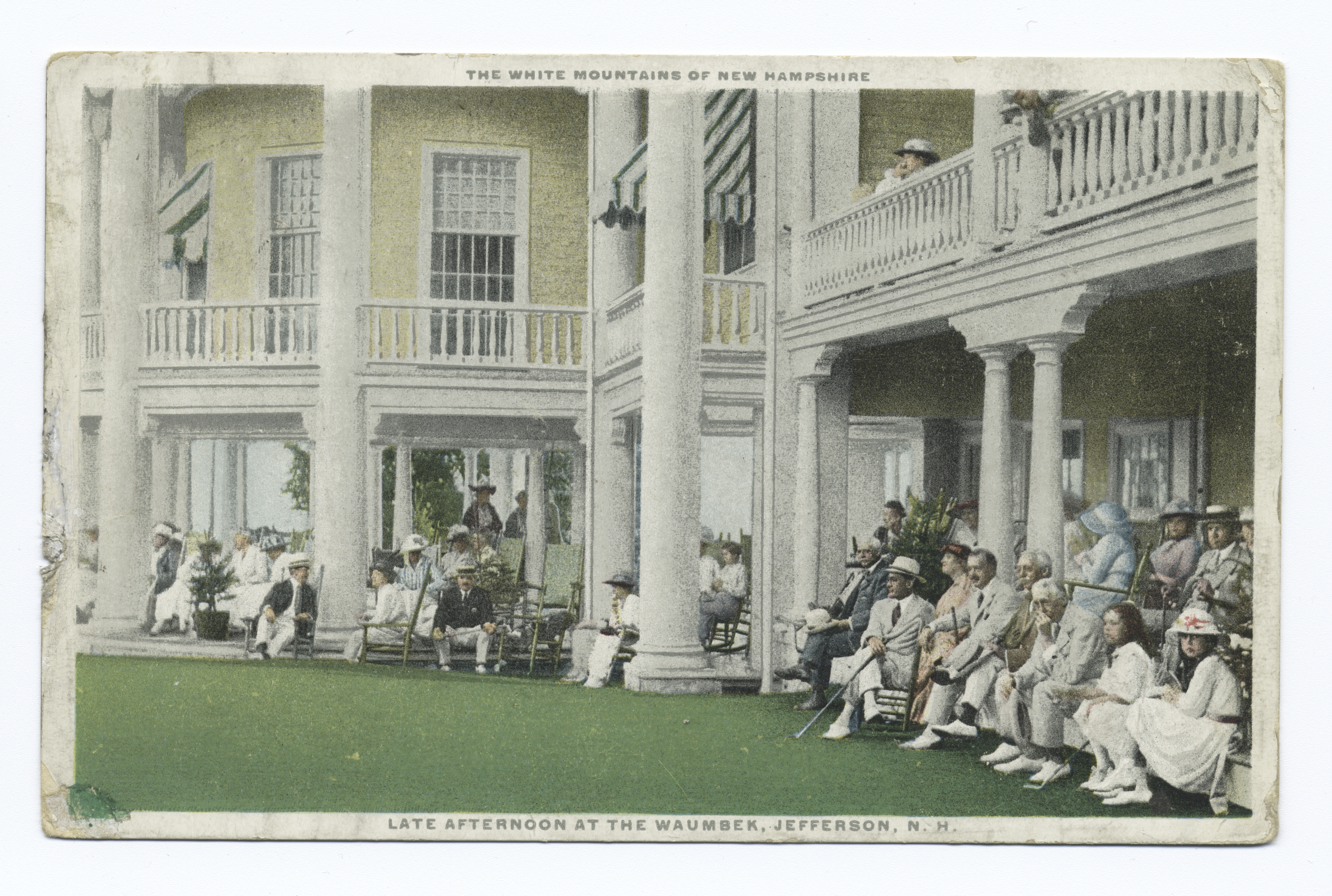
Waumbek House, late afternoon, early 20th century

The historic district is located on Cottage Road and Starr King Road, on the southern flank of Mount Starr King north of U.S. Route 2 and just east of the village center of Jefferson. The landscape and setting feature views of the White Mountains to the south. The cottages are surmised to have been designed, based on similarity to other work, by Alfred Barlow, who designed a major addition to the hotel. All of the cottages are in the Shingle style, with Queen Anne style porches.

The district's six cottages were added to the New Hampshire State Register of Historic Places on October 31, 2005: Bashaba (14 Starr King Road), Beit-el-Hakeen / The Birches (25 Cottage Road), Onaway (18 Cottage Road), The Bungalow (38 Starr King Road), Wayonda (36 Cottage Road), and Wyndybrae (13 Cottage Road).

== See also ==
- National Register of Historic Places listings in Coos County, New Hampshire
