= Rolfe Barn =

- U.S. National Register of Historic Places
- NH State Register of Historic Places
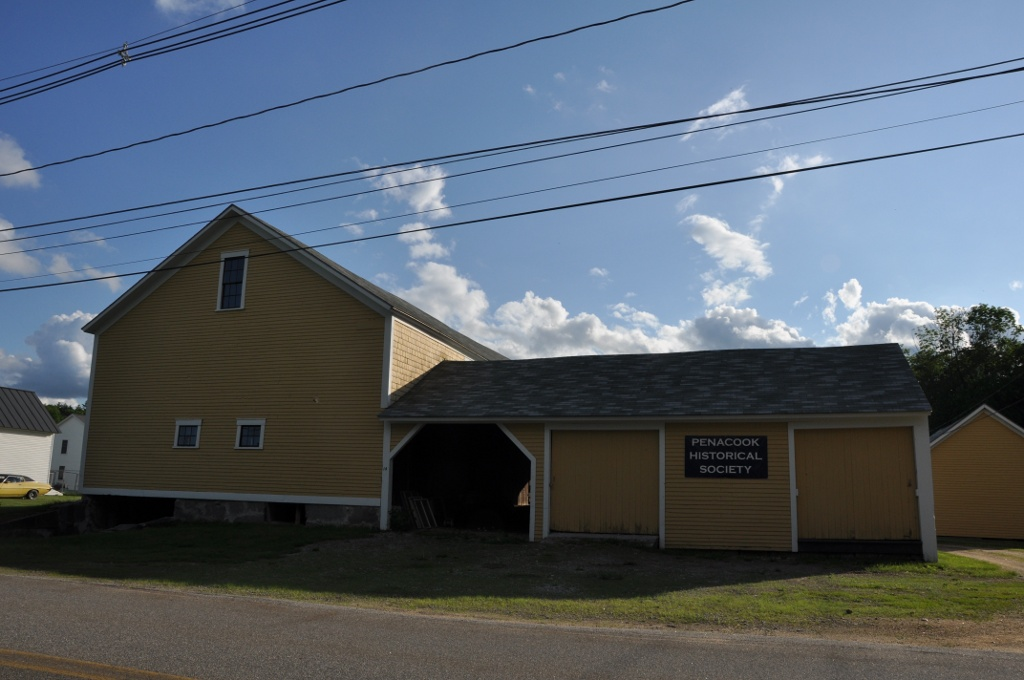

- Location within New Hampshire Location within the United States
- Location: 16 Penacook St., Concord, New Hampshire
- Coordinates: 43°17′0″N 71°35′23″W
- Area: 1.5 acres (0.61 ha)
- Built: 1790
- NRHP reference No.: 07000154

Significant dates
- Added to NRHP: March 15, 2007
- Designated NHSRHP: July 28, 2003 (initial); October 31, 2005 (enlarged); April 28, 2008 (enlarged)

The Rolfe Barn is a historic barn at 16 Penacook Street in the Penacook village of Concord, New Hampshire. The property was listed on the National Register of Historic Places in 2007. The barn was first added to the New Hampshire State Register of Historic Places in 2003; additional structures on the property were added in 2005 (homestead) and 2008 (historic district).

== History ==
Built c. 1790, the timber frame barn is probably the best-preserved barn of the period in the state. It is also distinctive for its construction methods and materials, which are rarely seen to survive in New Hampshire. The building's frame is made of oversized timbers, which were hand-hewn and then smoothed with an adze, a rare step not usually taken for barn construction. The building was framed as two separate three-bay English-style barns joined by a bay in the center, giving the frame seven bays in all. The interior layout of the barn matches this construction: the central area has two threshing bays, and there are hay lofts on the outer ends.

The barn was built about 1790 by Nathaniel Rolfe, or possibly his brother Benjamin. Rolfe lived in the 1770s house that stands on the property, although it was located north of the barn and moved to its present location about 1888. The Rolfes were third-generation residents of Concord; their grandfather was one of the town's early proprietors. Nathaniel Rolfe operated a large and prosperous farm, and was active in Concord's civic affairs. Later members of the Rolfe family contributed to Penacook's development as an industrial center, but maintained the farm until the 1860s. The barn was then apparently used in conjunction with a Rolfe-owned shop, housing draft horses. The shop closed in 1941, and the property with the barn on it was sold out of the Rolfe family in 1991.

In addition to the house of Nathaniel Rolfe, the property on which the barn stands includes a wagon shed from the turn of the 20th century, and a 1998 house that is occupied by the property's caretakers. When the barn was sold with the intent of moving it in the 1990s, the Penacook Historical Society raised funds to acquire the entire property, and now uses it as its headquarters.

== See also ==
- National Register of Historic Places listings in Merrimack County, New Hampshire
