= Baptist New Meeting House =

Historic church in New Hampshire, United States

- U.S. National Register of Historic Places
- NH State Register of Historic Places
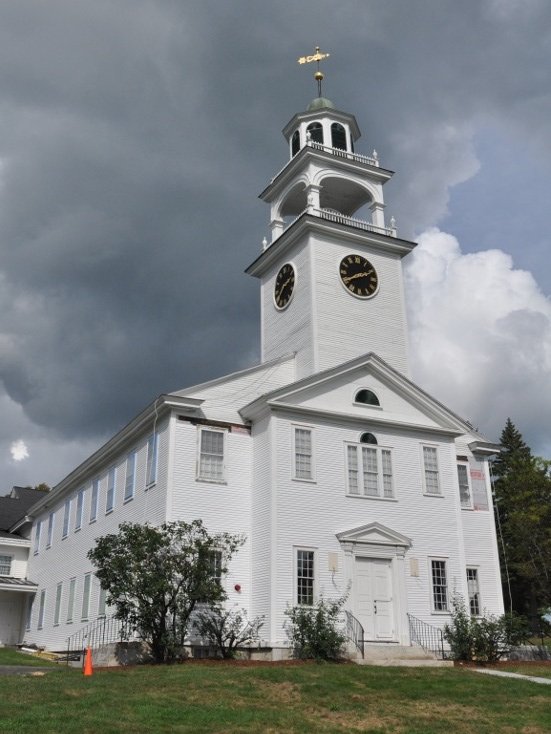

- Location within New Hampshire Location within the United States
- Location: 461 Main St., New London, New Hampshire
- Coordinates: 43°24′45″N 71°58′50″W
- Area: 1.3 acres (0.53 ha)
- Built: 1826
- Architect: Asher Benjamin (Design)
- Architectural style: Federal
- NRHP reference No.: 05001446

Significant dates
- Added to NRHP: December 22, 2005
- Designated NHSRHP: April 25, 2005

The Baptist New Meeting House is a historic church building at 461 Main Street in New London, New Hampshire. Built in 1826, its styling closely follows the patterns laid out by Asher Benjamin in his 1797 The Country Builder's Assistant, a major architectural guide from the Federal period. It was listed on the National Register of Historic Places in December 2005 and the New Hampshire State Register of Historic Places in April 2005.

== Architecture and history ==
The Baptist New Meeting House is located in the town center of New London, on the north side of Main Street (New Hampshire Route 114), between Seamans Road and the campus of Colby-Sawyer College. It is a two-story wood-frame structure, with a gable roof and projecting entry pavilion, topped by a three-stage tower. The entry pavilion is three bays wide, with a center entrance framed by pilasters and a pedimented gable. The flanking bays each have narrow sash windows, with a Palladian window above the entrance, and a half-round louvered fan in the gable above. The tower has a clock in its first stage, an open four-posted belfry as the second, and an octagonal lantern capped by a spire.

New London was largely settled by Baptists from Massachusetts, and their congregation was supported by the town as a whole until the state made such arrangements illegal in 1819. As a result, the Baptists were denied use of the town meeting house, and sought to build their own building. This church was built in 1826, and its styling closely follows the patterns laid out by Asher Benjamin in his 1797 The Country Builder's Assistant, a major architectural guide from the Federal period. It is consequently a relatively late example of this style. The tower houses a Revere bell.

== See also ==
- National Register of Historic Places listings in Merrimack County, New Hampshire
