= Brick Schoolhouse (Sharon, New Hampshire) =

- U.S. National Register of Historic Places
- NH State Register of Historic Places
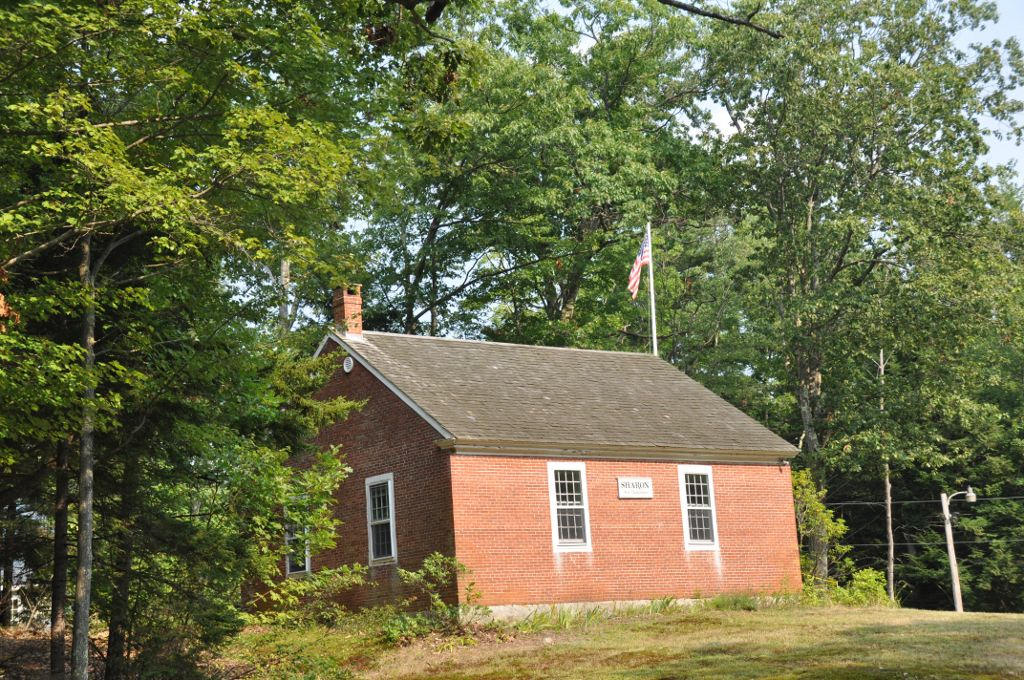

- Location within New Hampshire Location within the United States
- Location: 432 NH 123, Sharon, New Hampshire
- Coordinates: 42°48′52″N 71°55′0″W
- Area: 5.5 acres (2.2 ha)
- Built: 1832
- Architectural style: Greek Revival
- NRHP reference No.: 02000957

Significant dates
- Added to NRHP: September 14, 2002
- Designated NHSRHP: October 25, 2001

The Brick Schoolhouse is a historic one-room schoolhouse at 432 New Hampshire Route 123 in Sharon, New Hampshire. Built in 1832, it is the only of the town's three such buildings to survive, and was the only one made of brick. It is also the only school building now standing in the town, since its students have been schooled in neighboring Peterborough since 1920. The building was listed on the National Register of Historic Places in 2002, and the New Hampshire State Register of Historic Places in 2001.

== Description and history ==
The Brick Schoolhouse is located in a rural setting of central Sharon, on the east side of Route 123 north of its junction with Mountain Road. It is set on a grassy rise above the road. It is a single-story structure 26 feet (7.9 m) wide and 30 feet (9.1 m) long, with a gabled roof. The main facade faces south, and has the main entrance at its center, flanked by short transom-like fixed windows. The side walls each have two sash windows. The interior is divided into two sections, with an entry vestibule 5 feet (1.5 m) deep, and the schoolroom occupying the rest of the building. The original wooden desks still occupy their places.

The school was built in 1832, after another district school located nearby was destroyed by fire. As it was the second on that site to suffer that fate, the town decided to build the third school out of brick. It was one of three district schools the town built during the 19th century, and remained in use as a school until 1920, when the town began sending its students to Peterborough. The building continued until 2007 to serve municipal purposes, seeing uses as a town meeting site, polling place, and town records repository.

== See also ==
- National Register of Historic Places listings in Hillsborough County, New Hampshire
