= George Washington Noyes House =

Historic house in New Hampshire, United States

- U.S. National Register of Historic Places
- NH State Register of Historic Places
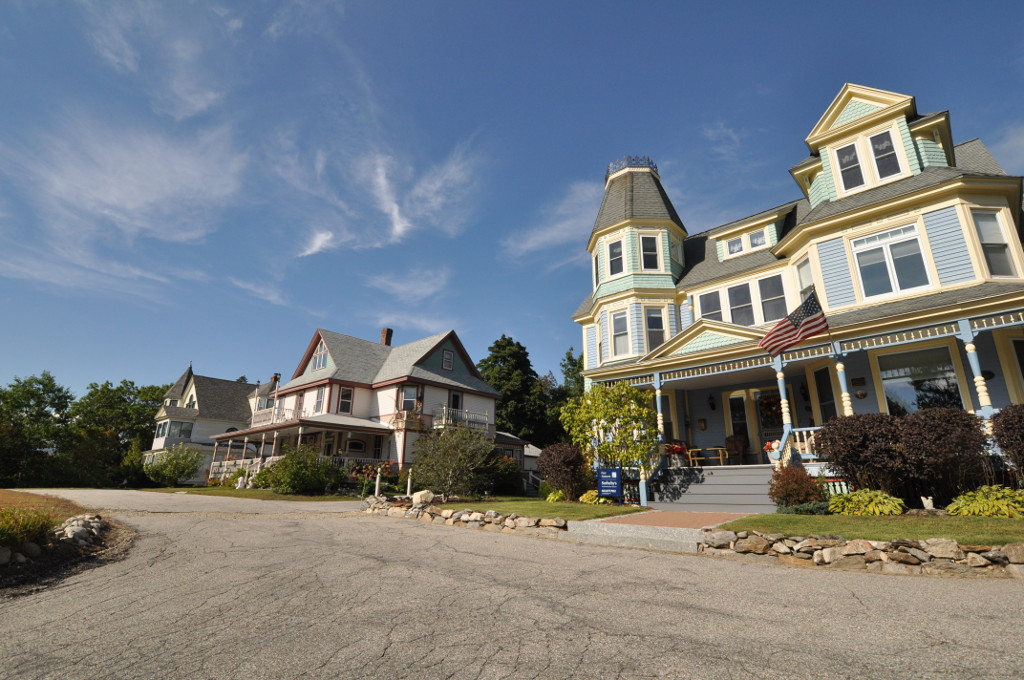
- The Noyes house is the rightmost house in this 2016 photo

- Location within New Hampshire Location within the United States
- Location: 2 Prospect Terr., Gorham, New Hampshire
- Coordinates: 44°23′20″N 71°10′18″W
- Area: less than one acre
- Built: 1893
- Architectural style: Queen Anne
- NRHP reference No.: 16000643

Significant dates
- Added to NRHP: September 19, 2016
- Designated NHSRHP: April 25, 2016

The George Washington Noyes House is a historic house at 2 Prospect Terrace in Gorham, New Hampshire. Completed in 1893, it is a prominent local example of Queen Anne architecture. It was listed on the National Register of Historic Places in September 2016, and the New Hampshire State Register of Historic Places in April 2016.

== Description and history ==
The George Washington Noyes House is located on a rise known as Soldier's Hill overlooking the Androscoggin River, northeast of the Gorham town common, on the north side of Prospect Terrace, a short spur road providing access to this house and to two other period houses. The house is 2 1/2 stories in height, with a complex cross-gabled roof configuration and an exterior clad in a combination of wooden clapboards and decoratively cut shingles. It has the asymmetrical look of a typical Queen Anne Victorian, with varying projecting sections and dormers. An octagonal turret occupies the buildings southwest corner, rising three stories to a truncated octagonal roof with an iron crest railing at the top. A single-story porch wraps across the front and around part of the right side, with turned posts and balusters, and a spindled valance. The interior retains numerous period features, including woodwork and stained glass windows.

The house was built in 1891–93, after a fire devastated that part of Gorham in 1879. It was built for George Washington Noyes, a worker on the Grand Trunk Railroad. Noyes initially worked on the railroad as a laborer, and rose to become one of its master mechanics. The house is one of three (all still standing) built on Soldier's Hill after the fire, and includes a well-preserved carriage barn with original hardware and finishes.

== See also ==
- National Register of Historic Places listings in Coos County, New Hampshire
