= New Castle Congregational Church =

Historic church in New Hampshire, United States

- U.S. National Register of Historic Places
- NH State Register of Historic Places
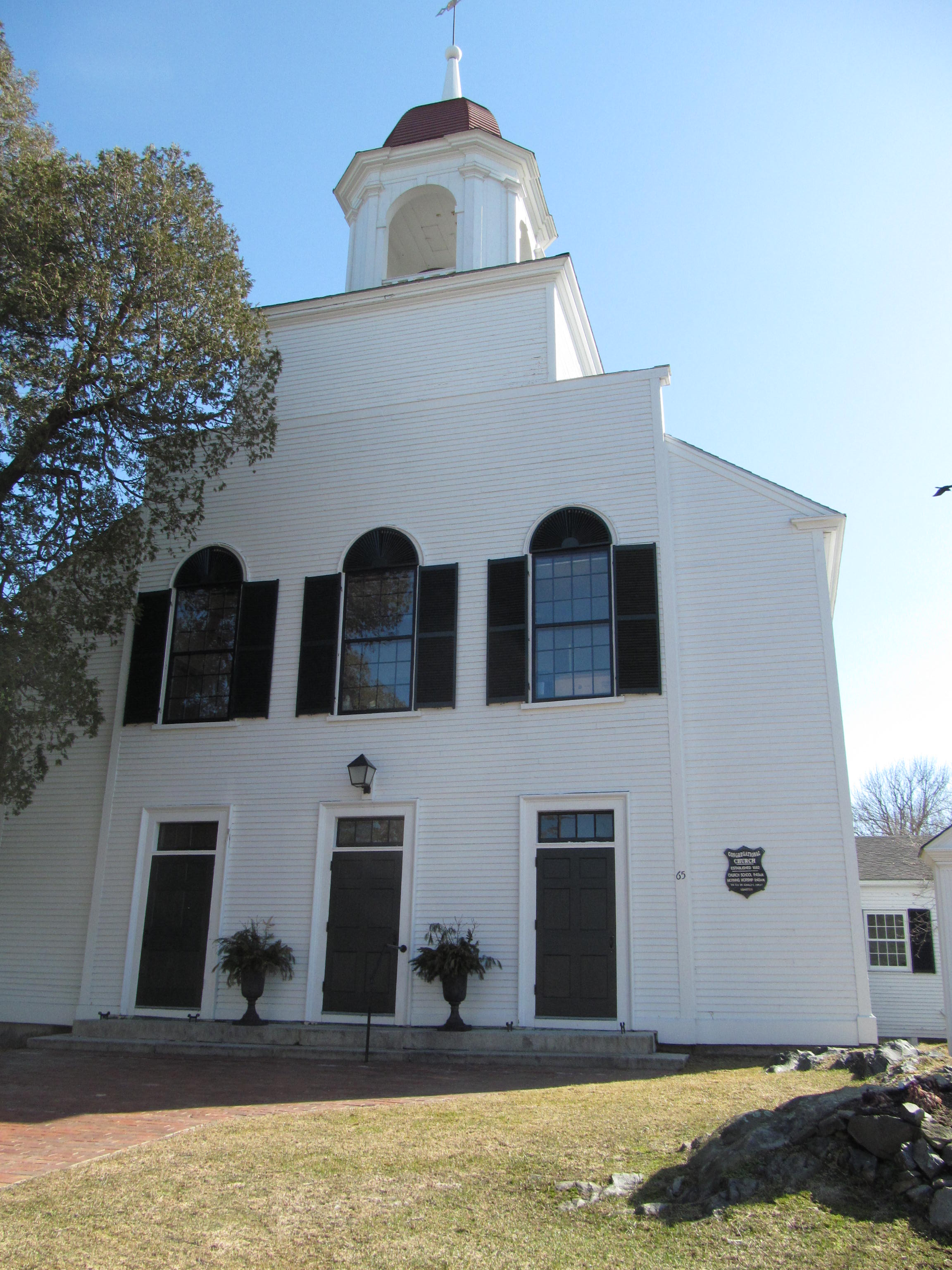

- Location within New Hampshire Location within the United States
- Location: 65 Main St., New Castle, New Hampshire
- Coordinates: 43°4′16″N 70°42′59″W
- Built: 1828
- Architect: Thomas F. Foye
- Architectural style: Federal
- NRHP reference No.: 14001241

Significant dates
- Added to NRHP: February 2, 2015
- Designated NHSRHP: July 30, 2007

The New Castle Congregational Church is a congregation of the United Church of Christ, located at 65 Main Street in New Castle, New Hampshire. Its church, the only ecclesiastical building in the small community, was built in 1828 by a local master builder, based on the architectural patterns published by Asher Benjamin, and also based in part on the St. John's Church in nearby Portsmouth. It has undergone little alteration since its construction.

The building was listed on the National Register of Historic Places in 2015, and the New Hampshire State Register of Historic Places in 2007.

== See also ==
- National Register of Historic Places listings in Rockingham County, New Hampshire
