= Carroll County Court House (New Hampshire) =

- U.S. National Register of Historic Places
- NH State Register of Historic Places
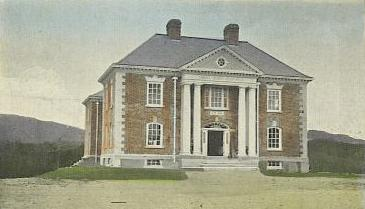

- Location within New Hampshire Location within the United States
- Location: 20 Courthouse Square, Ossipee, New Hampshire
- Coordinates: 43°41′6″N 71°7′4″W
- Area: less than one acre
- Built: 1916
- Built by: Wallace Building Co.
- Architect: Dow, Albert H.
- Architectural style: Colonial Revival
- NRHP reference No.: 07000949

Significant dates
- Added to NRHP: September 12, 2007
- Designated NHSRHP: October 27, 2003

The Carroll County Court House is a historic former courthouse at 20 Courthouse Square in Ossipee, New Hampshire. Built in 1916, it is the county's oldest surviving courthouse, and a prominent local example of Colonial Revival architecture. It housed county offices until the 1970s, was a courthouse until 2004, and now houses the Ossipee Historical Society. The building was added to the National Register of Historic Places in 2007, and the New Hampshire State Register of Historic Places in 2003.

== Description and history ==
The Carroll County Court House stands in Ossipee Village, on the south side of Courthouse Square near its junction with Old Route 28 and Browns Ridge Road. It is an I-shaped two-story structure, built out of brick with limestone trim. It is organized with wide sections at the front and rear, and a central joining section between them. The front section originally housed county offices, the central section the main courtroom, and the rear the offices of judges and other court-related facilities. Each section is covered by a hip roof. The main facade is three bays wide, with a shallow project central gabled section supported by paired Doric columns. Ground floor windows are set in segmented-arch openings with limestone keystones, and second-floor windows are set in rectangular openings with splayed lintels and keystones. The entrance is a double-leaf door with flanking sidelight windows and a large semi-oval transom window above.

The first courthouse built in what is now Carroll County was in 1839 on this site, when the area was still part of Strafford County. Carroll County was established in 1840, and that courthouse was selected as the county seat. This building was constructed in 1916 to meet increased needs for space. It was designed by Albert H. Dow, a native of nearby Tuftonboro who worked in Boston, Massachusetts. It underwent significant interior work in 1960, again to meet demand for more space, particularly for county offices. These were relocated to a new building in 1979, and the court facilities were moved to another new building in 2004. The building has since been maintained by the Ossipee Historical Society.

== See also ==
- National Register of Historic Places listings in Carroll County, New Hampshire
