= North Hampton Town Hall =

- U.S. National Register of Historic Places
- NH State Register of Historic Places
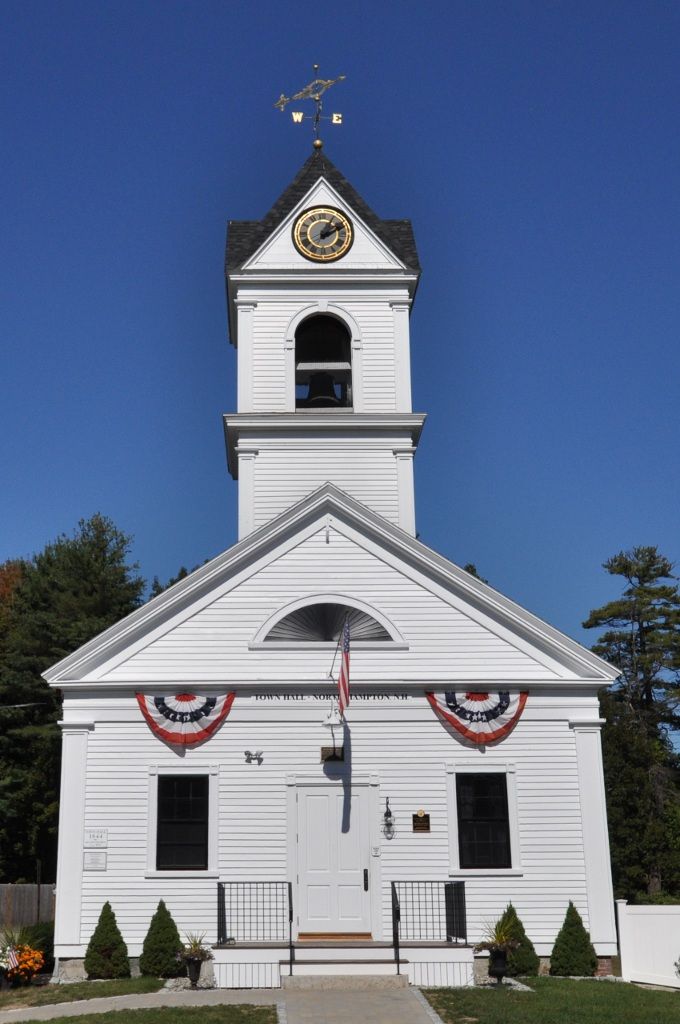

- Location within New Hampshire Location within the United States
- Location: 231 Atlantic Ave., North Hampton, New Hampshire
- Coordinates: 42°58′24″N 70°49′46″W
- Area: Less than one acre
- Built: 1844
- Architectural style: Greek Revival
- NRHP reference No.: 13000006

Significant dates
- Added to NRHP: February 13, 2013
- Designated NHSRHP: May 1, 2006

The North Hampton Town Hall is located at 231 Atlantic Avenue in North Hampton, New Hampshire. Built in 1844, it was the town's first purpose-built municipal building, and continues to be used as such. Its construction includes materials recovered from older dual-purpose religious and civic buildings, and its tower houses a Revere bell. The building was listed on the National Register of Historic Places in 2013, and the New Hampshire State Register of Historic Places in 2006.

== Description and history ==
The North Hampton Town Hall stands amid a cluster of civic buildings on the north side of Atlantic Avenue (New Hampshire Route 111), a short way east of its junction with Lafayette Road (U.S. Route 1). It is a single-story white clapboarded building with a two-stage tower, in which hangs an 1816 Revere bell. The tower's pyramidal roof and clock were added in 1920. The building corners have Greek Revival pilasters, which rise to an entablature and a fully pedimented gable. At the center of the gable is a half-oval fanlight in the Federal style. There is a single main entrance, placed at the center of the front facade, with sash windows on either side. Both the windows and entrance are trimmed by narrower Federal-style moulding.

The structure was built in 1844 to serve the town's municipal needs, a function it continues to serve today. It was built about one-quarter mile (0.40 km) east of the previous meetinghouse, which served both civic and religious functions, and marked a shift in the civic center of the community to a point nearer the railroad, which passes north-south just east of the municipal complex. In addition to the bell, which originally hung in the town's second meetinghouse, the building includes timbers from meetinghouses built in 1734 and 1761.

== See also ==
- National Register of Historic Places listings in Rockingham County, New Hampshire
