= William D. Weeks Memorial Library =

- U.S. National Register of Historic Places
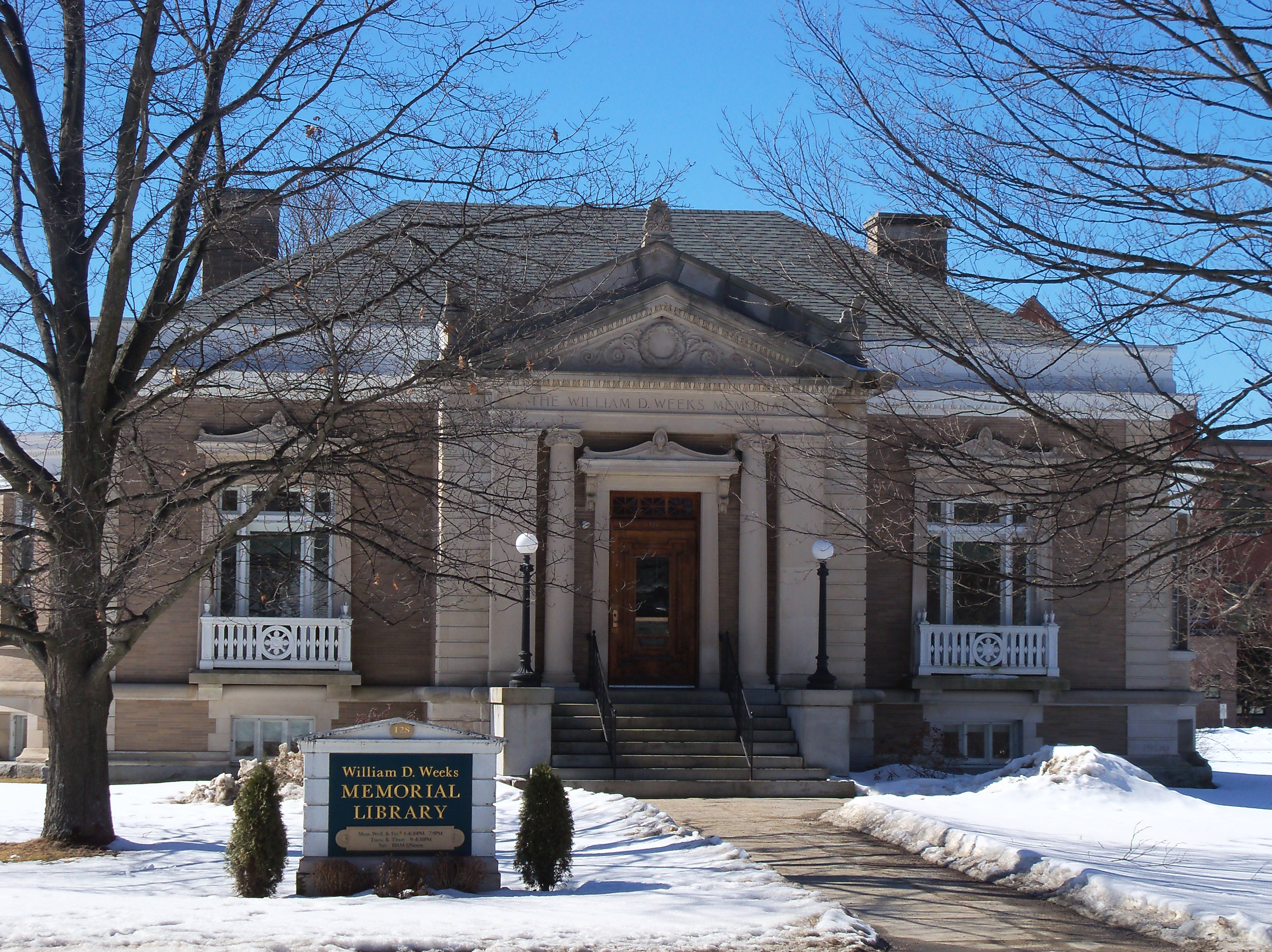

- Location within New Hampshire Location within the United States
- Location: 128 Main St., Lancaster, New Hampshire
- Coordinates: 44°29′27″N 71°34′16″W
- Area: less than one acre
- Built: 1906
- Architect: McLean & Wright; Tennant/Wallace
- Architectural style: Beaux Arts
- NRHP reference No.: 00001464
- Added to NRHP: December 1, 2000

The William D. Weeks Memorial Library, also referred to as the Weeks Memorial Library, is a publicly funded, nonprofit library governed by the Town of Lancaster in Coös County, New Hampshire.

Located at 128 Main Street, the single-story brick building was constructed in 1906, enlarged in 1998, and listed on the National Register of Historic Places in 2000. Currently a repository of approximately 62,000 books, news publications, and audiovisual materials, Weeks Memorial Library identifies itself as a hub of community involvement for youth, teens, and adults alike.

According to the library's website, there are more than 4,000 residents of the Lancaster area, including surrounding communities, who are served by active library cards.

== History ==
A few years before 1850, the town of Lancaster started its first circulating library. In 1858, a Reading Circle was established for the people of the town. They secured additional funding for the library after a November 1860 town hall meeting, and this library was in operation until 1867. Approximately 200 volumes belonged to the Reading Circle, which was housed in first librarian George O. Rogers' office. At this time, library membership was offered to the townspeople at the price of $20 per share. This system of membership continued for the next 70 years.

In 1884, George P. Rowell, a member of the Social Reading Circle and chief founder of Lancaster's public library services, donated 1,000 books for the town's free public library efforts, which had expanded to include 2,500 volumes. The 1896 Lancaster Library was housed in what was formerly the 1806 Coos Courthouse.

Rowell also offered the former Lancaster Academy building for use as a free public library under the condition that the town raise $500 in support of the initiative. This marked the beginning of the Lancaster Public Library (not to be confused with the library of the same name in Lancaster, Pennsylvania). Rowell then funded the building's renovations and a new catalog for the library's collection, which had grown to approximately 4,000 titles within a few years.

In 1905, former House of Representatives member, Massachusetts senator, and U.S. Secretary of War John Wingate Weeks sponsored the construction of a new library building in Lancaster to be named in memory of his father, William Dennis Weeks. Although he became a politician in Massachusetts, John W. Weeks had family ties in Lancaster, and the proposed library building acted as a tribute to the education that led to his future success in politics. He went on to introduce the Weeks Act in 1911, which authorized the purchase and regulation of land in the eastern United States to protect rivers and watersheds. This legislation led to the establishment of the nearby White Mountain National Forest.

At its opening in 1908, the Weeks Memorial Library consisted of 9,000 books. Built with future growth of the collection in mind, the space could reasonably accommodate roughly 20,000 items. The library's juvenile department, funded by the Colonel Town Income Spending Committee, was introduced in 1930.

In order to adjust to the growing collection and provide adequate library services, expansion of the Weeks Memorial Library was necessary. The 1998 addition was meant to make library facilities easily accessible to all patrons while also bringing the building up to standard with the current safety codes. At this time, Weeks Memorial Library housed a collection of more than 30,000 books, in addition to 1,000 audiovisual materials.

In 2000, the Weeks Memorial Library was listed on the National Register of Historic Places under criteria A and C as a historically significant place in regards to construction and function.

According to libraries.org public statistics, William D. Weeks Memorial Library serves a population of 3,507 residents and has an annual circulation of 35,377 transactions. As of August 2016, the library's collection included a total of 61,937 volumes. The current library director is Barbara R. Robarts.

== Architecture ==
The Weeks Memorial Library was modeled in the Beaux-Arts architectural style, characterized by "projecting and receding masses, classical columns, carved window and door heads, and other details such as quoins, ascroteria, and antifixae." This was a popular style of architecture amongst libraries in the 20th century, as was the T-shaped plan its design followed. These were common characteristics of several other libraries built with financial support from the Carnegies.

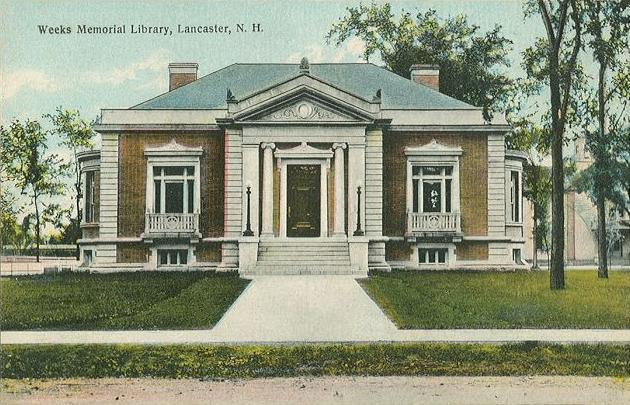
Weeks Memorial Library

The original building, designed by McLean & Wright, is measured at 60 by 40 feet (18 by 12 m) and is topped by a hipped roof with two chimneys. A central projecting entry pavilion dominates the front façade, with a recessed entry topped by a transom window and a cornice in scrolled brackets. The doorway is flanked with Doric columns, and Ionic pilasters beyond the recessed area. Above the pilasters is an entablature and triangular pediment with decorated tympanum.

The building was extended in 1998. The addition, designed by Thomas Wallace of Tennant/Wallace Architects in Manchester, New Hampshire, complemented the architecture of the original structure while still using modern techniques and materials.

== Library services and programs ==
Programs and activities include story times, book discussion groups, recreational activities that promote exercise and healthy living, and movie nights. The library also offers adult learner services like basic reading, writing, and math education, ESOL (English for Speakers of Other Languages) instructional resources, and GED preparation.

Weeks Memorial Library's collection consists of 62,000 books, news publications, and audiovisual materials that are geared toward juveniles, teens, and adults.

The town of Lancaster's total population is 3,507, and the Weeks Memorial Library boasts approximately 4,000 active library card holders within the town and its surrounding communities.

=== Databases ===
It is a member library of the North Country Library Cooperative under the statewide umbrella organization, the New Hampshire State Library, through which the library offers patrons access to a variety of databases and online resources.

- Ancestry
- Biography Resource Center
- EBSCO
- Heritage Quest
- NewsBank
- OCLC

=== Genealogy and history ===
Weeks Memorial Library features an extensive collection of local and genealogical resources for patrons at all stages of the research process, including The New Hampshire Collection, vital records, and local news publications on microfilm.

- Coös County Democrat
- Coös Republican
- Groveton Advertiser
- Independent / Lancaster Gazette
- Lancaster Herald
- White Mountain Echos
- Whitefield Times

== See also ==
- Lancaster, New Hampshire
- National Register of Historic Places listings in Coös County, New Hampshire
- Weeks Estate
