= Saint Anne Historic District =

Historic district in New Hampshire, United States

- U.S. National Register of Historic Places
- U.S. Historic district
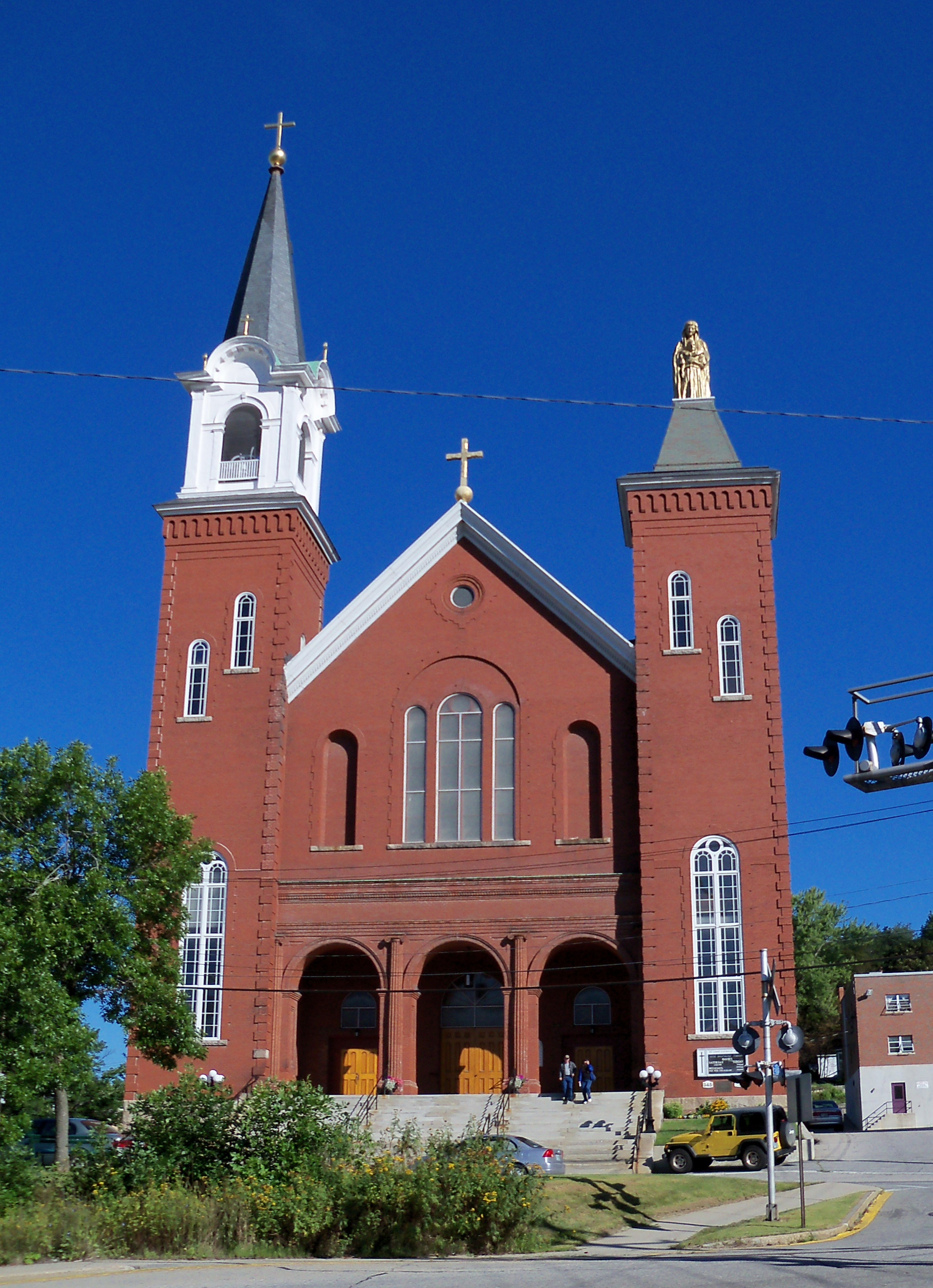
- St. Anne's Church

- Location within New Hampshire Location within the United States
- Location: Bounded by Pleasant/Main, Church, School & Success Sts., Berlin, New Hampshire
- Coordinates: 44°28′24″N 71°10′36″W
- Built: 1900
- Built by: M. H. Roy
- Architect: Archibald I. Lawrence
- Architectural style: Late Victorian, Romanesque
- NRHP reference No.: 100002973
- Added to NRHP: September 18, 2018

The Saint Anne Historic District encompasses a collection of institutional buildings associated with the French Canadian Roman Catholic community in Berlin, New Hampshire. The district includes the St. Anne Church, the St. Regis School, and the St. Louis Hospital, all facilities built by the church to support the local French Canadian community. The district was listed on the National Register of Historic Places in 2018.

== Description and history ==
Berlin's French Canadian community has its beginnings in the 1860s, after the Grand Trunk Railway began service to the area. Saint Anne's was its first Roman Catholic parish, established in 1867. The parish grew rapidly as the city became a lumber processing center, and the present church was built in 1900 to a design by Archibald I. Lawrence, a local architect. The St. Regis Academy was founded in 1889, and its present building was completed in 1911. St. Louis Hospital, a 63-bed facility, was opened in 1905. The hospital closed in 1978, and has been converted into housing.

This complex of buildings is located northeast of Berlin's central business district, on three blocks bounded by Pleasant, Main, Church, School, and Success streets. The church, located at the western end of the grouping, is a distinctive example of Romanesque architecture, and is separately listed on the National Register. The academy is located just to its east, facing Main Street, with the parish hall located behind it. The former hospital building is located at the eastern end of the complex.

== See also ==
- National Register of Historic Places listings in Coos County, New Hampshire
