= Weeks Junior High School =

- U.S. National Register of Historic Places
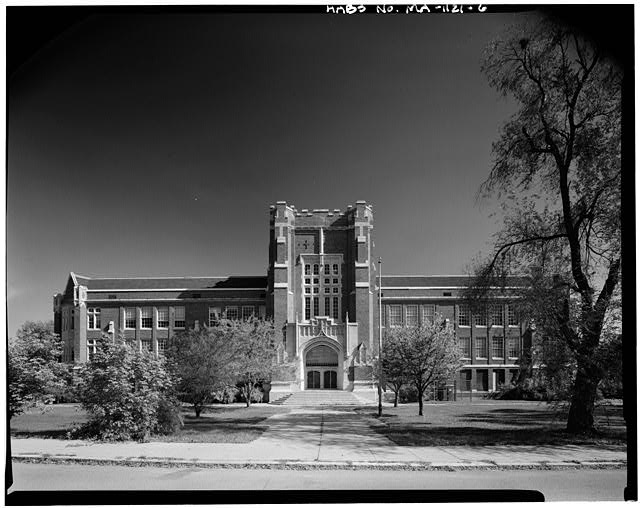
- Weeks Junior High School, ca. 1933

- Location within Massachusetts Location within the United States
- Location: 7 Hereward Rd., Newton, Massachusetts
- Coordinates: 42°19′24″N 71°11′51″W
- Built: 1930
- Architect: Henry & Richmond
- Architectural style: Tudor Revival
- NRHP reference No.: 84000105
- Added to NRHP: October 23, 1984

The former Weeks Junior High School, also known as John Wingate Weeks Junior High School, is a historic school located at 7 Hereward Road, corner of Rowena Road in the village of Newton Center in Newton, Massachusetts. Built in 1930, it was named for John Wingate Weeks (April 11, 1860 – July 12, 1926), who was mayor of Newton 1903–1904 before becoming a United States representative from Massachusetts from 1905 to 1913, a United States Senator from 1913 to 1919, and the United States Secretary of War from 1921 to 1925. He also was a co-founder in 1888 of the investment firm Hornblower & Weeks. His son Sinclair Weeks was mayor of Newton when the school was opened.

Weeks Junior High School was added to the National Register of Historic Places in 1984.

Today the former Weeks Junior High School building is John W. Weeks House, a HUD apartment complex owned by the city and managed by the Newton Community Development Foundation, Inc.

== Gallery ==
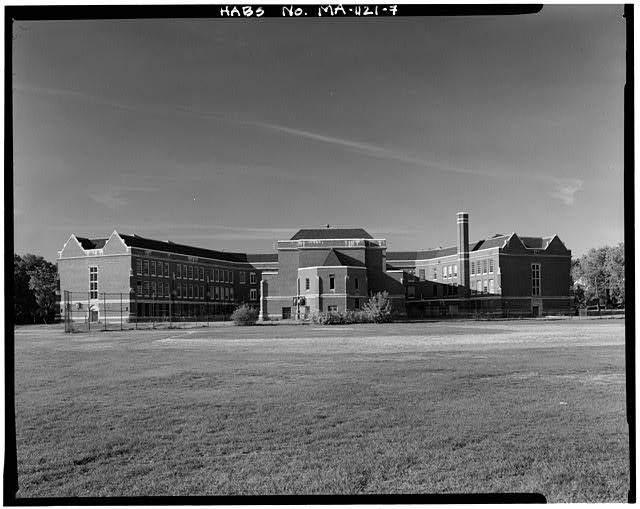
Rear elevation, ca. 1933

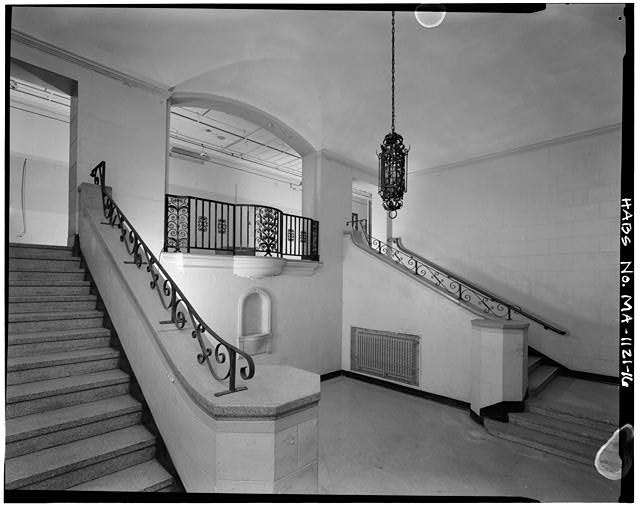
Ground floor, entrance foyer

== See also ==
- National Register of Historic Places listings in Newton, Massachusetts
