= Garland Mill =

- U.S. National Register of Historic Places
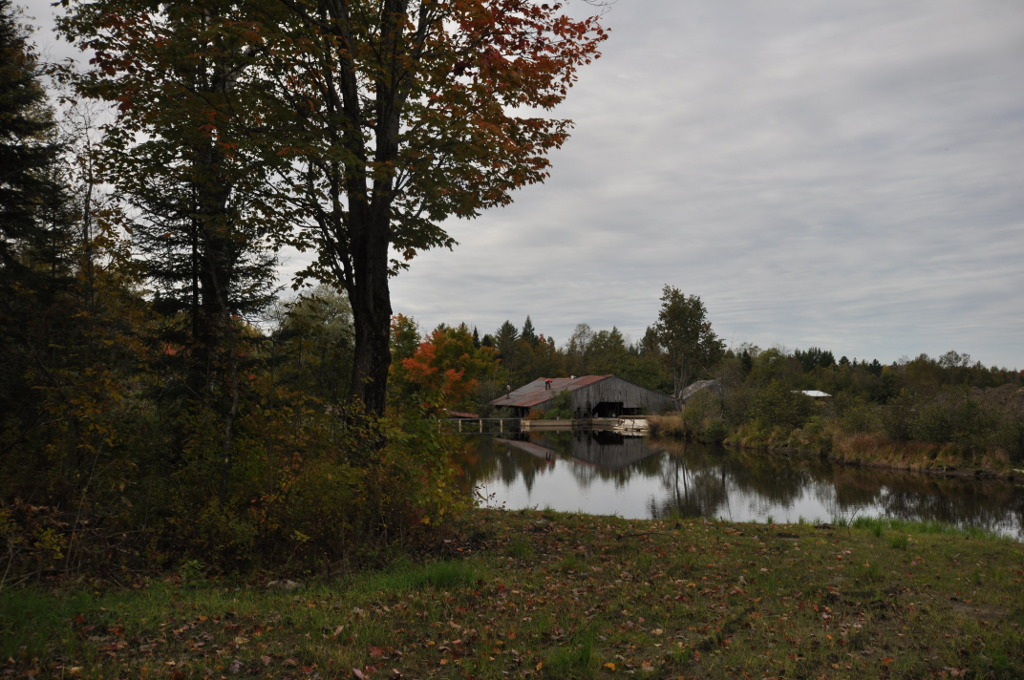

- Location within New Hampshire Location within the United States
- Location: Garland Rd., Lancaster, New Hampshire
- Coordinates: 44°28′24″N 71°28′50″W
- Area: 5 acres (2.0 ha)
- NRHP reference No.: 82000616
- Added to NRHP: November 12, 1982

The Garland Mill is a historic sawmill on Garland Road in Lancaster, New Hampshire. Built about 1860, and repeatedly modified to adapt to growth and new technology, it is the only water-powered sawmill (a once-common sight) in the state. The property was listed on the National Register of Historic Places in 1982.

== Description and history ==
The Garland Mill stands in a rural upland area of eastern Lancaster, on the west side of Garland Road at its junction with Pleasant Valley Road. The property is bisected by Garland Brook, which provides the mill's power. The mill is set astride the stream, separated from the main road by the mill pond and wooded area. A wooden crib dam with rock fill provides a drop of about 16 feet (4.9 m) at the eastern end of the building. The main mill is a broad single-story timber-framed structure. The interior is one large chamber, with large entrances on the north and south sides to facilitate the entry of logs and the exit of sawn lumber. A wooden penstock brings water to a turbine, from which a series of leather belts deliver power from the main shaft to the saws.

The mill was built in 1860 by Eben Crocket Garland, and was a relatively successful small mill operation. It grew in the subsequent decades, its growth spurred by the arrival of railroad service to Lancaster. In 1870, it was one of 640 sawmills in the state. The mill was sold by Garland's son in 1888. It is now roughly three times the size of its original construction, and kept pace with technological changes through the mid-20th century, updating its turbines when more efficient ones became available.

The building was listed on the National Register of Historic Places in 1982. At the time of its listing it was still in operation as the only water-powered sawmill in the state.

== See also ==
- National Register of Historic Places listings in Coos County, New Hampshire
