= United States Post Office–Lancaster Main =

- U.S. Post Office–Lancaster Main
- U.S. National Register of Historic Places
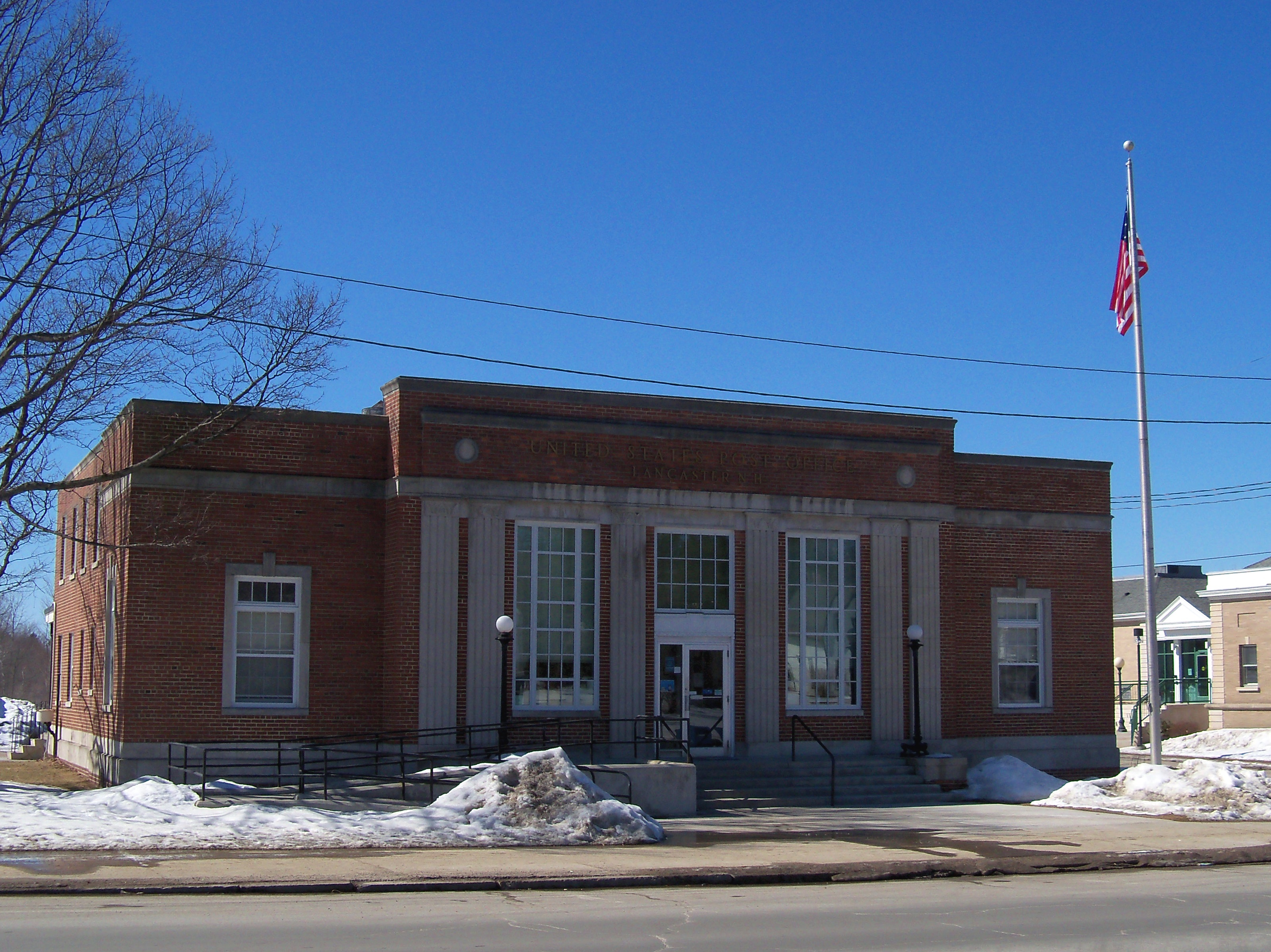

- Location within New Hampshire Location within the United States
- Location: 120 Main St., Lancaster, New Hampshire
- Coordinates: 44°29′27″N 71°34′13″W
- Area: 0.4 acres (0.16 ha)
- Built: 1935
- Architect: Simon, Louis A.; Et al.
- Architectural style: Art Deco, Starved Classicism
- NRHP reference No.: 86002245
- Added to NRHP: July 17, 1986

The U.S. Post Office–Lancaster Main is a historic post office at 120 Main Street in Lancaster, New Hampshire. Built in 1935, it is one of the few examples of Art Deco architecture in northern New Hampshire. The building was listed on the National Register of Historic Places in 1986.

== Description and history ==
Lancaster's main post office stands just north of the town's central business district, amid a cluster of civic and religious buildings. It is set close to the street at the southwest corner of Main and School Streets, giving it a visually commanding location in the town center, where most of the buildings are set back. It is a single-story masonry structure with a flat roof. The brick is laid in common bond, atop a granite base layer and water table. The center of the main facade projects from the main block, and features six pilasters of fluted granite construction topped by a raised parapet. The building's symmetry is marred by the addition of a handicapped access ramp to the left half of the front. The interior lobby space is finished with plaster, wood, and masonry. The marble floors are finished in an Art Nouveau multicolored pattern, which is echoed in the wainscoting, which is made of quarry tile. Original lattice grillwork is found at the service windows.

The post office was built in 1935 to a design by Louis A. Simon, then the supervising architect of the United States Department of the Treasury. The building's styling is described as "Starved Classicism", a variant of Art Deco styling that is unusual and rare in the region.

== See also ==
- National Register of Historic Places listings in Coos County, New Hampshire
