= National Register of Historic Places listings in Coös County, New Hampshire =

Location of Coös County in New Hampshire

This is a list of the National Register of Historic Places listings in Coös County, New Hampshire.

This is intended to be a complete list of the properties and districts on the National Register of Historic Places in Coös County, New Hampshire, United States. Latitude and longitude coordinates are provided for many National Register properties and districts; these locations may be seen together in a map.

There are 33 properties and districts listed on the National Register in the county, including 1 National Historic Landmark.

Contents: Counties in New Hampshire
Belknap - Carroll - Cheshire - Coös - Grafton - Hillsborough - Merrimack - Rockingham - Strafford - Sullivan

This National Park Service list is complete through NPS recent listings posted September 26, 2025.

== Current listings ==
	Name on the Register	Image	Date listed	Location	City or town	Description
1	Benjamin Aldrich Homestead	Benjamin Aldrich Homestead	March 11, 2003 (#03000109)	Shaw Rd., 0.46 miles east of Piper Hill; 44°55′41″N 71°28′35″W	Colebrook	
2	The Balsams	The Balsams	March 13, 2002 (#02000166)	NH 26, 10 mi (16 km) east of Colebrook; 44°52′08″N 71°18′25″W	Dixville	
3	George E. Burgess School-Notre Dame High School	George E. Burgess School-Notre Dame High School	June 25, 2015 (#15000175)	411 School St. 44°28′29″N 71°10′29″W	Berlin	
4	Columbia Covered Bridge	Columbia Covered Bridge	December 12, 1976 (#76000123)	Across Connecticut River between U.S. Route 3 and VT 102; 44°51′12″N 71°33′05″W	Columbia	Extends into Lemington, Vermont
5	Congregational Church	Congregational Church	January 4, 1980 (#80000282)	921 Main St. 44°28′40″N 71°10′18″W	Berlin	
6	Crawford Depot	Crawford Depot	April 29, 1982 (#82001672)	Off U.S. Route 302; 44°13′04″N 71°24′40″W	Carroll	Restored former train station, now a visitor center at the top of Crawford Notch
7	Crawford House Artist's Studio	Crawford House Artist's Studio	September 12, 1985 (#85002193)	AMC Highland Center, Route 302; 44°13′11″N 71°24′40″W	Carroll	Home and studio of artist Frank Henry Shapleigh, 1877-1893; now part of the Appalachian Mountain Club's Highland Center
8	Fabyan Guard Station	Fabyan Guard Station	May 14, 2018 (#100002400)	Cherry Mountain Rd., 0.7 miles (1.1 km) N of US 302; 44°16′47″N 71°28′14″W	Carroll	
9	Garland Mill	Garland Mill	November 12, 1982 (#82000616)	Garland Rd. 44°28′24″N 71°28′50″W	Lancaster	
10	Holy Resurrection Orthodox Church	Holy Resurrection Orthodox Church	May 16, 1979 (#79000196)	Petrograd St. 44°28′06″N 71°11′30″W	Berlin	An Eastern Orthodox church built by Russian immigrants in 1915
11	Indian Stream Schoolhouse	Indian Stream Schoolhouse	October 11, 2011 (#11000730)	Tabor Rd. 45°02′47″N 71°26′39″W	Pittsburg	
12	Martin Homestead	Martin Homestead	October 30, 1998 (#98001145)	U.S. Route 3, 3 mi (4.8 km) north of North Stratford; 44°46′11″N 71°36′05″W	North Stratford	
13	Meadow Bridge	Meadow Bridge	December 10, 2003 (#03001284)	Spur of North Rd. in Shelburne across the Androscoggin River; 44°24′16″N 71°04′03″W	Shelburne	Bridge is disassembled beside modern bridge approaches.
14	Mount Orne Covered Bridge	Mount Orne Covered Bridge	December 12, 1976 (#76000124)	Over Connecticut River southwest of Lancaster off NH 135; 44°27′38″N 71°39′12″W	Lancaster	Also listed in Lunenburg, Vermont
15	Mount Washington Hotel	Mount Washington Hotel	September 27, 1978 (#78000213)	Off U.S. Route 302; 44°15′29″N 71°26′25″W	Bretton Woods	Spa hotel in the White Mountains; site of 1944 Bretton Woods international monetary conference.
16	Mountain View House	Mountain View House	June 9, 2004 (#04000588)	120 Mountain View Rd. 44°23′55″N 71°35′19″W	Whitefield	
17	Mt. Jasper Lithic Source	Mt. Jasper Lithic Source	May 29, 1992 (#92000631)	1½ miles northwest of the confluence of the Dead and Androscoggin Rivers; 44°29′08″N 71°11′40″W	Berlin	A prehistoric Native American stone quarry.
18	Nansen Ski Jump	Nansen Ski Jump	June 20, 2019 (#100004084)	83 Milan Rd. 44°31′59″N 71°10′12″W	Milan	
19	George Washington Noyes House	George Washington Noyes House	September 19, 2016 (#16000643)	2 Prospect Terrace; 44°23′20″N 71°10′18″W	Gorham	
20	Philbrook Farm Inn	Philbrook Farm Inn	March 15, 1984 (#84002804)	North Rd. 44°24′16″N 71°03′08″W	Shelburne	
21	Potter Site		April 28, 2021 (#100006475)	Address Restricted	Randolph vicinity	A major Native American habitation site.
22	St. Anne Church	St. Anne Church	May 29, 1979 (#79000197)	58 Church St. 44°28′22″N 71°10′41″W	Berlin	A Catholic church built in 1900 by French immigrants
23	Saint Anne Historic District	Saint Anne Historic District	September 18, 2018 (#100002973)	Bounded by Pleasant/Main, Church, School & Success Sts. 44°28′24″N 71°10′36″W	Berlin	A Catholic church and associated school and hospital buildings.
24	Stark Covered Bridge	Stark Covered Bridge	December 1, 1980 (#80000283)	East of Groveton at NH 110 and Northside Rd. 44°36′03″N 71°24′30″W	Stark	Over Upper Ammonoosuc River
25	Stark Union Church	Stark Union Church	December 8, 1983 (#83004089)	NH 110; 44°36′04″N 71°24′30″W	Stark	
26	Tip-Top House	Tip-Top House	January 11, 1982 (#82001673)	Mount Washington State Park; 44°16′14″N 71°18′14″W	Sargent's Purchase	
27	US Post Office-Lancaster Main	US Post Office-Lancaster Main	July 17, 1986 (#86002245)	120 Main St. 44°29′27″N 71°34′13″W	Lancaster	
28	Wallace Farm	Wallace Farm	December 13, 2001 (#01001353)	27 Wallace Rd. 44°51′59″N 71°31′41″W	Columbia	
29	Waumbek Cottages Historic District	Waumbek Cottages Historic District	March 15, 2006 (#06000142)	13, 18, 25, and 36 Cottage Rd., and 14 and 38 Starr King Rd. 44°25′01″N 71°28′08″W	Jefferson	
30	Weeks Estate	Weeks Estate	June 6, 1985 (#85001190)	US 3; 44°27′05″N 71°34′15″W	Lancaster	Listing encompasses part of Weeks State Park.
31	Weeks State Park	Weeks State Park	July 17, 2023 (#100009128)	200 Weeks State Park Rd. 44°27′05″N 71°34′15″W	Lancaster	
32	William Dennis Weeks Memorial Library	William Dennis Weeks Memorial Library	December 1, 2000 (#00001464)	128 Main St. 44°29′27″N 71°34′16″W	Lancaster	
33	Wilder-Holton House	Wilder-Holton House	June 11, 1975 (#75000231)	226 Main St. 44°30′11″N 71°34′41″W	Lancaster	

== See also ==
- List of National Historic Landmarks in New Hampshire
- National Register of Historic Places listings in New Hampshire
