= Fabyan Guard Station =

- U.S. National Register of Historic Places
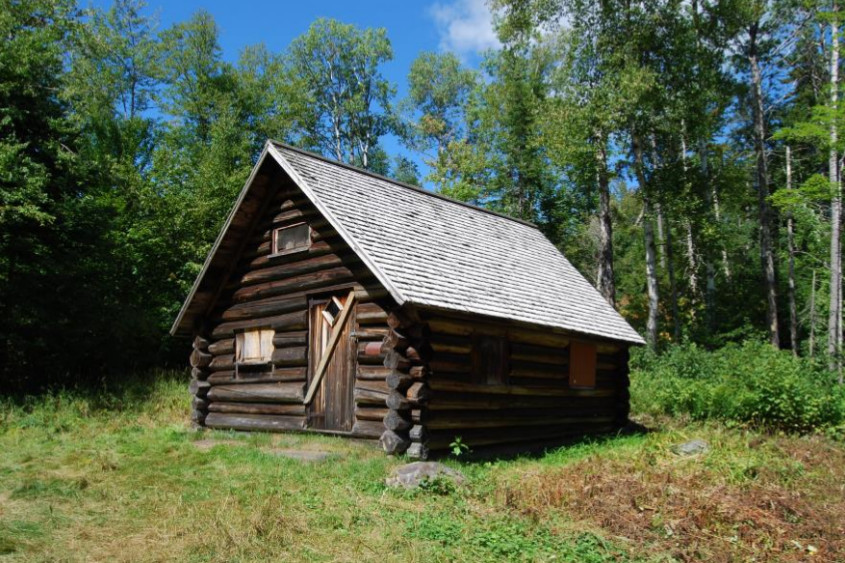
- 2013 photo

- Location within New Hampshire Location within the United States
- Location: Cherry Mountain Rd., 0.7 miles (1.1 km) north of US 302, Carroll, New Hampshire
- Coordinates: 44°16′47″N 71°28′14″W
- Area: less than one acre
- Built: 1923
- Built by: Clifford L. Graham
- Architectural style: Rustic vernacular
- NRHP reference No.: 100002400
- Added to NRHP: May 14, 2018

The Fabyan Guard Station is a historic United States Forest Service building in the White Mountain National Forest in northern New Hampshire. Located on Cherry Mountain Road north of the Fabyan settlement in Carroll, this 1923 guard station is the only surviving example of this type of structure in the White Mountains. It was listed on the National Register of Historic Places in 2018.

== Description and history ==
The Fabyan Guard Station is located about 0.7 miles (1.1 km) north of United States Route 302, on Cherry Mountain Road near a crossing of Desolation Brook. It stands in a small clearing on the west side of the road. It is a single-story log structure, measuring about 16 by 20 feet (4.9 m × 6.1 m), with a gabled roof. It is built out of spruce logs, with the gaps filled with wooden slats and chinked with oakum. The main facade has a door on the right, fashioned out of vertical boards, and windows to its left and in the gable above. The side walls each have two small windows.

The station was built in 1926 by Graham L. Clifford, an early supervisor of the White Mountain National Forest. At the time of its construction, Cherry Mountain Road was part of the Jefferson Turnpike, a toll road passing through the mountains. (The road is one of the longest and best-preserved sections of this old turnpike, which dates to 1811, and is now a seasonal road maintained by the Forest Service.) It was one of the first guard stations to be built in the forest, serving as temporary residences for Forest Service employees assigned to guard that section of forest at a time when transportation was relatively difficult.

== See also ==
- National Register of Historic Places listings in Coos County, New Hampshire
