= Martin Homestead =

Historic house in New Hampshire, United States

- U.S. National Register of Historic Places
- U.S. Historic district
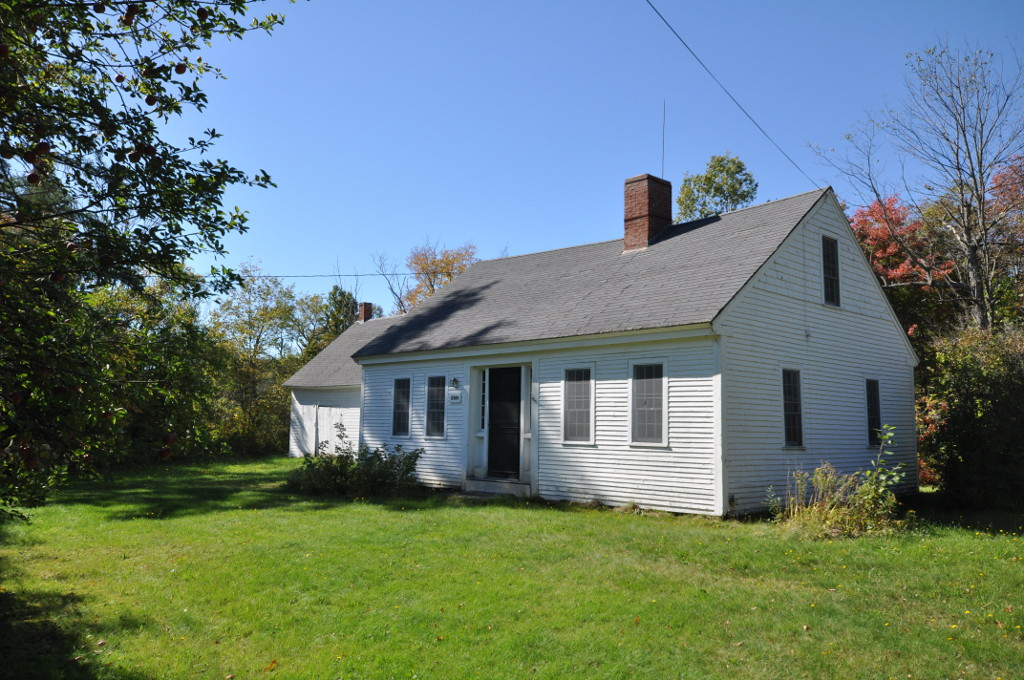

- Location within New Hampshire Location within the United States
- Location: W side of US 3, 3 miles (4.8 km) N of North Stratford, New Hampshire
- Coordinates: 44°46′16″N 71°35′44″W
- Area: 112.5 acres (45.5 ha)
- Built: 1834
- Architect: Martin, Joseph Austin
- Architectural style: Colonial, New England cape
- NRHP reference No.: 98001145
- Added to NRHP: October 30, 1998

The Martin Homestead is a historic farm property on U.S. Route 3 in Stratford, New Hampshire. Established in 1830, it retains both the original house and English barn, with 112.5 acres (45.5 ha) of land whose original usage patterns are still discernible. The property was listed on the National Register of Historic Places in 1998.

== Description and history ==
The Martin farm property is located in far northern Stratford, its entire extent straddling the border with neighboring Columbia. The property is for the most part a strip of land projecting eastward from the Connecticut River, which forms its western boundary. The area nearer the river is wider, and is where the farm's open fields are located. The property is also divided by U.S. Route 3. There are fields on both sides of the road, with the area further east rising into wooded uplands. The farmstead is located on the west side of Route 3 in Stratford, about 3 miles (5 km) north of North Stratford, New Hampshire.

The main house is a well-preserved 1 1/2-story plank-framed Cape house. The house may have been built c. 1830 by Joseph Martin, after he acquired the property in a tax sale, or it may already have been standing there. The presence of only a half-basement suggests that three bays of the house were built before it was widened to its present five-bay width. Although it has had some alteration, including a complete rebuilding of its central chimney, the house is the best-preserved period Cape in Stratford. The "English" barn standing to the house's north appears to be contemporary to the house. This arrangement of detached buildings was common in early 19th-century New England, giving way later in the century (often via modification of older farmsteads) to connected farmsteads. The surviving arrangement seen here is particularly rare in the area.

== See also ==
- National Register of Historic Places listings in Coos County, New Hampshire
