= Mount Prospect Ski Tow =

Ski area in New Hampshire, United States

- Interactive map of Mount Prospect Ski Tow
- Location: Lancaster, New Hampshire, U.S.
- Coordinates: 44.4572°N 71.5769°W
- Status: Last operated in 2021
- Vertical: 300 ft (91 m) (ski tow); 700 ft (210 m) (hike)
- Trails: 3, plus glades
- Lift system: 1 rope tow
- Snowmaking: None
- Website: www.mountprospectskitow.com

Mount Prospect Ski Tow is a currently dormant ski area located within Weeks State Park in Lancaster, New Hampshire, United States. It is located on land owned by the State of New Hampshire, operating under a lease agreement.

== History ==
The area has operated seasonally since the 1940s. As of February 1948, it included a 900-foot (270 m) rope tow, three-quarters-mile (1.2 km) intermediate trail, and warming hut operated by the Mt. Prospect Outing Club.

After closing in 1997, the area did not operate until re-opening for the 2007–08 season. As of 2009, the area's lone ski tow was powered by an engine from a 1957 Chevrolet.

The area did not open in 2022, as organizers sought to "replace the rope, corral new volunteers and shuffle our leadership team." Lacking snowmaking capabilities, it also did not open for the 2022–23 season, due to weather conditions.
