= George E. Burgess School =

- George E. Burgess School-Notre Dame High School
- U.S. National Register of Historic Places
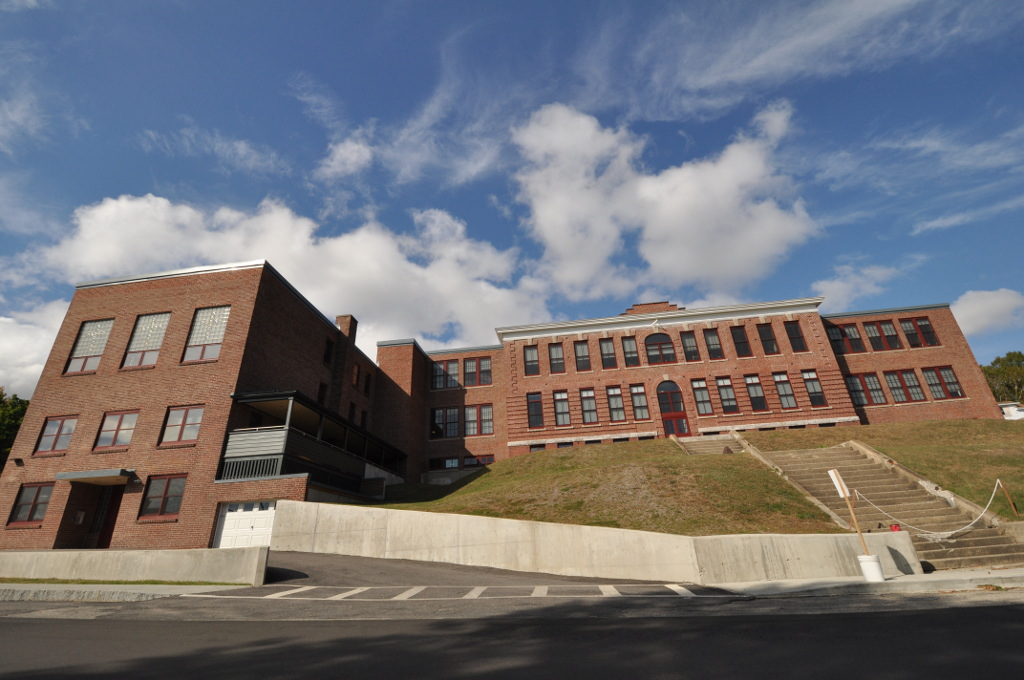

- Location within New Hampshire Location within the United States
- Location: 411 School St., Berlin, New Hampshire
- Coordinates: 44°28′29″N 71°10′29″W
- Area: 1.2 acres (0.49 ha)
- Built: 1905
- Architect: Archibald I. Lawrence
- NRHP reference No.: 15000175
- Added to NRHP: June 25, 2015

The George E. Burgess School is a historic former school building in Berlin, New Hampshire. Built in 1905 as a public elementary school, it is a well-preserved example of an early 20th-century public school building. It became Notre Dame High School in 1942, operated by the local Roman Catholic diocese, and was the city's first Catholic high school. Closed in 1972, it has since been converted into senior living. The building was listed on the National Register of Historic Places in 2015.

== Description and history ==
The former Notre Dame High School building stands northeast of downtown Berlin, on the north side of School Street between Houle and Spring streets. The area is a sloping hillside overlooking the Androscoggin River, and the school is set high above the street, its main entrance accessed by two flights of stairs across a sloping lawn. It is a roughly L-shaped two-story brick structure, with an original main section that has been added to several times. The facade of the original section is Classical Revival, with brick quoining at the corners and brick banding between the ground-floor windows. Windows are generally rectangular, and set in openings with stone sills and splayed brick lintels. The main entrance is set in a round-arch opening, and has a window in a rounded segmental-arch opening above it on the second floor.

The original main block has matching wings extending to the east and west, with less elaborate brickwork. Attached to the left wing is the former convent wing, which projects forward, and has three stories owing to the sloping terrain.

The main block was built in 1905 as a public school, and is a well-preserved example of an early 20th-century public school building. It was closed when Berlin's school enrollment declined during the Great Depression, and was leased to the local Roman Catholic diocese in 1942, which opened it as the Notre Dame High School, the first high school available to Berlin's students. It was sold to the diocese in 1946, which enlarged the building in 1949 and 1954 with the two side wings and convent. The diocese operated the school until 1972. It then stood vacant for a time, suffering from vandalism and neglect, which included the loss by fire of its gymnasium. It was converted to senior housing in the 2010s.

== See also ==
- National Register of Historic Places listings in Coos County, New Hampshire
