= Congregational Church (Berlin, New Hampshire) =

Historic church in New Hampshire, United States

- U.S. National Register of Historic Places
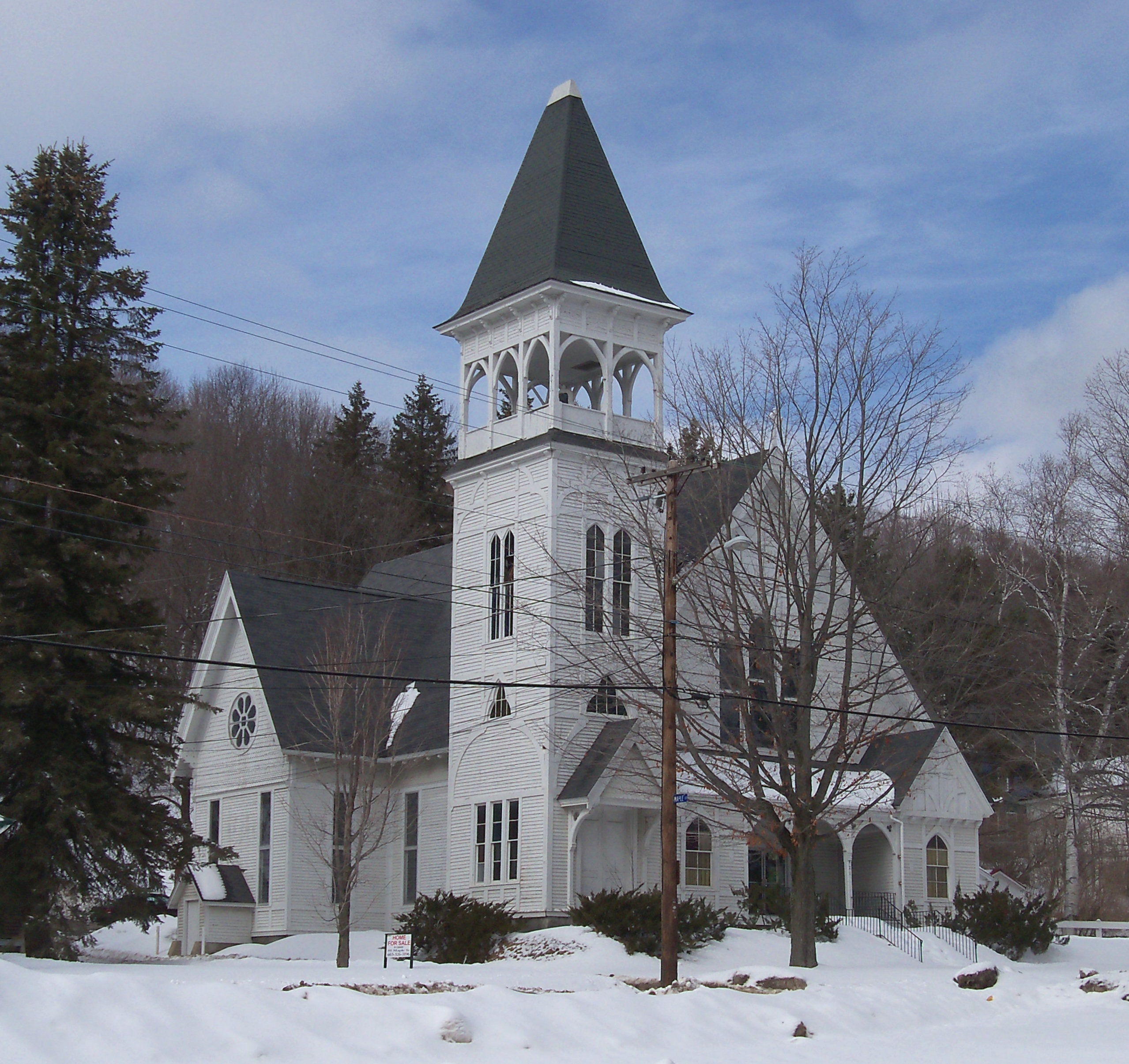

- Location within New Hampshire Location within the United States
- Location: 921 Main St., Berlin, New Hampshire
- Coordinates: 44°28′40″N 71°10′18″W
- Area: 0.5 acres (0.20 ha)
- Built: 1882
- Architectural style: Stick/Eastlake
- NRHP reference No.: 80000282
- Added to NRHP: January 4, 1980

The Congregational Church (also known as the United Church of Christ) is a historic church building in Berlin, New Hampshire. Built in 1882, it was the community's first church building, and is a prominent local example of Stick/Eastlake Victorian architecture. The building was listed on the National Register of Historic Places in 1980. The congregation was affiliated with the United Church of Christ. The building is now a private residence.

== Architecture and history ==
Berlin's Congregational Church is located in Berlin's downtown area, on the west side of Main Street at the southern junction with Maple Street. It is a rectangular single-story wood-frame structure, with a steeply pitched gable roof. Its exterior is clad in a combination of wooden clapboards, shingles, and applied Stick-style woodwork. A gabled projection extends to the left side near the rear, and a multi-stage rectangular tower rises from the left front corner. The tower has narrow windows (arched in the Gothic style on the second level), with an open belfry topped by a pyramidal roof with flared eave. The belfry openings have arched woodwork and low balustrades. A shed-roof shelter extends across the front of the main facade between the tower and a projecting gabled secondary entrance. The main entrance is in the base of the tower under a bracketed hood.

The Berlin Congregationalist congregation first organized in 1836, when a Sunday School was established, and the first settled minister was hired the following year. The congregation first met in private spaces, typically homes or barns. In 1852, the owners of the H. Winslow store made their upstairs hall available for services. The present church, the community's first dedicated church building, was built in 1882 on land donated by the Berlin Mills Company.

== See also ==
- National Register of Historic Places listings in Coos County, New Hampshire
