= Holy Resurrection Orthodox Church (Berlin, New Hampshire) =

Historic church in New Hampshire, United States

- U.S. National Register of Historic Places
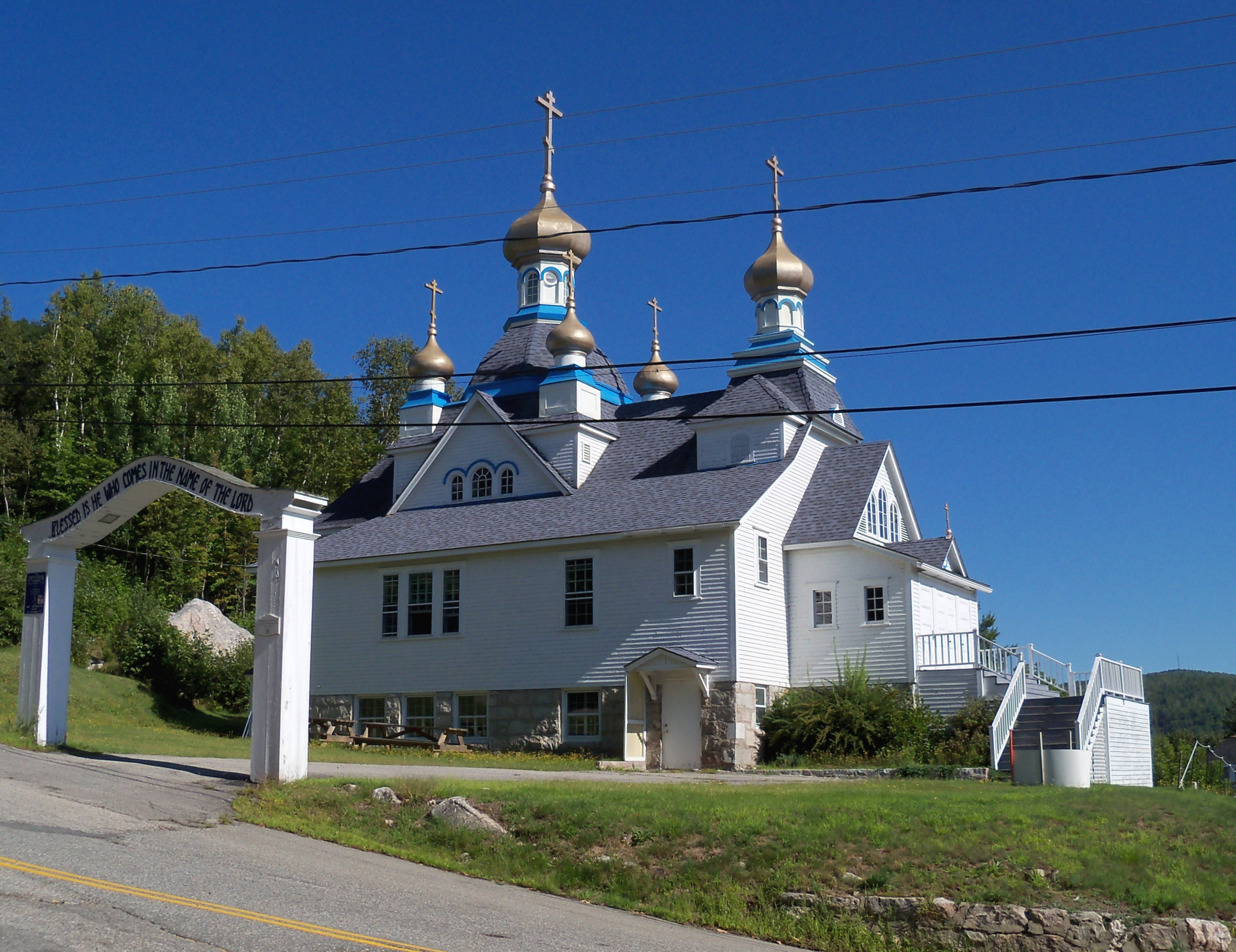
- The Holy Resurrection Orthodox Church

- Location within New Hampshire Location within the United States
- Location: 20 Petrograd St., Berlin, New Hampshire
- Coordinates: 44°28′6″N 71°11′30″W
- Area: 1 acre (0.40 ha)
- Built: 1915
- Architectural style: Orthodox Church
- NRHP reference No.: 79000196
- Added to NRHP: May 16, 1979

The Holy Resurrection Orthodox Church (Russian: Свято-Воскресенская Православная Церковь, romanized: Svyato-Voskresenskaya Pravoslavnaya Tserkov) is a historic Eastern Orthodox Church building on Petrograd Street in Berlin, New Hampshire. The church is known locally as "The Russian Church" because it was built in 1915 by immigrants from the Russian Empire who were mostly from the provinces of Grodno, Volyn, and Minsk in modern-day Belarus and Ukraine. The church closed in 1963 but reopened in 1974 for the funeral of a Russian immigrant from modern-day Belarus, named Eugenia (Tarasevich) Tupick. It was added to the National Register of Historic Places in 1979 and is part of the Orthodox Church in America (OCA).

== Architecture ==
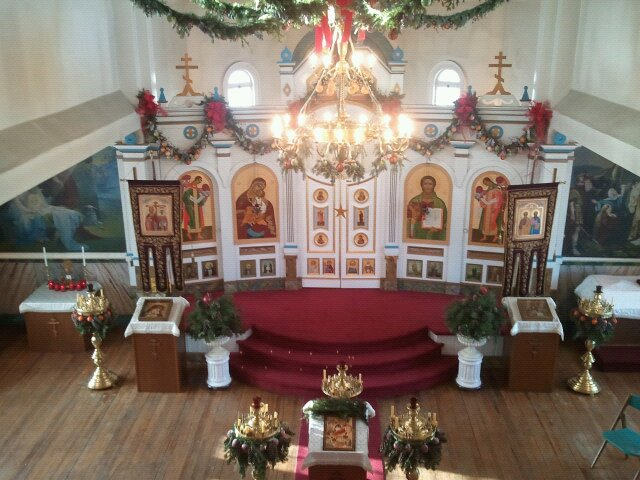
Inside the Holy Resurrection Orthodox Church

The Holy Resurrection Orthodox Church was designed by John Bergesen, an architect from New York City. The church was built with six onion domes, which was common in Russian architecture of that period. The dimensions of the church are 36 by 63 feet (11 by 19 m), which does not include the main entrance, and a height of approximately 100 feet (30 m). The inside of the church is divided into three parts: the vestibule, the nave, and the sanctuary. Its icons were some of the last ones to leave Russia before Czar Nicholas II was overthrown.

== History ==
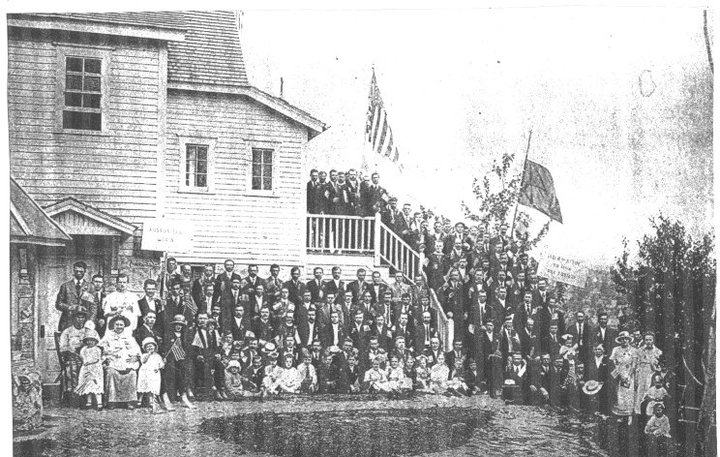
A group of immigrants at the church, around 1916

In 1915, Reverend Arcady Piotrowsky came to Berlin from Cleveland, Ohio to establish an Orthodox church for the approximately 500 Russians that inhabited Berlin at that time. At first the church services were held in another church, but then moved to an old garage owned by the city. A site at the base of Mt. Forest was chosen for a new church building to be built, and on May 1, 1915, construction of the church began. On October 1, of that same year, the church was complete.

== Reliquaries ==
Holy Resurrection Orthodox Church houses two reliquary icons, one of Saint Herman of Alaska and one of Saint Nicholas the Wonderworker. The relic of Saint Herman of Alaska was given to the church by Metropolitan Theodosius during a parish visit. In the icon of Saint Nicholas, the saint is pictured holding the city of Berlin in his hand. The relic of Saint Nicholas was found in the altar in late summer of 2003, originally transferred from Saint Nicholas Orthodox Church in Richmond, Maine, and placed into the icon by Bishop Nikon December 6, 2003.

== See also ==
- History of the Eastern Orthodox Church in North America
- National Register of Historic Places listings in Coos County, New Hampshire
- Orthodox Church in America
