= Philbrook Farm Inn =

- U.S. National Register of Historic Places
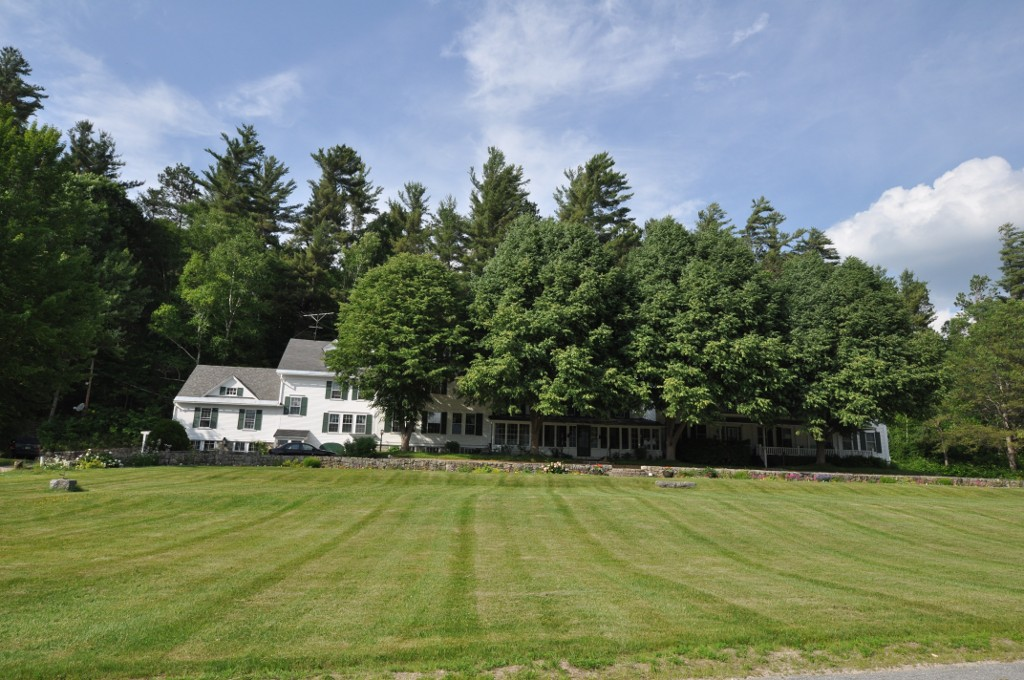

- Location within New Hampshire Location within the United States
- Location: North Rd., Shelburne, New Hampshire
- Coordinates: 44°24′16″N 71°3′8″W
- Area: 2 acres (0.81 ha)
- Built: 1834
- NRHP reference No.: 84002804
- Added to NRHP: March 15, 1984

The Philbrook Farm Inn is a historic inn on North Road in Shelburne, New Hampshire. At the core of the inn's holdings is a farmhouse whose oldest section dates to about 1834. Functioning as a tourist accommodation since 1861, it was managed by the same family for 120 years. The inn was listed on the National Register of Historic Places in 1984.

== Description and history ==
The Philbrook Farm Inn stands in a rural area in eastern Shelburne, on the north side of North Road overlooking the flood plains of the Androscoggin River to the south, as well as portions of the White Mountains. The main building of the inn is a rambling 2-1/2 story wood-frame structure, consisting of a c. 1834 farmhouse with numerous additions. The main block houses the main desk and some guest quarters, with more guest quarters in a wing to the east. Dining facilities and residential quarters of the innkeepers are in a wing to the west, and the kitchen is in a wing on the north side. The west wing's front is flush with that of the main house, while the eastern wing has two sections, that nearest the house slightly recessed, and that at the far eastern end projecting slightly. The area in front of the first of these sections is a now-enclosed porch.

The farmhouse was built about 1834 by the Hodgdon family, and was converted into a tourist accommodation in 1861 by the Philbrook family. It was one of the early tourist accommodations to be opened in the region, and has survived numerous changes in transportation and tastes. The Philbrooks first extended the house to the east in 1861, and further expanded the guest room wing to in 1906. A fire in 1934 destroyed a barn and other facilities on the west side of the house, after which they built the present dining and kitchen facilities. It was sold out of the Philbrook family in 1983, ending more than 120 years of operation by a single family. It is one of the only tourist accommodations to survive in northern New Hampshire from the early period of that activity.

== See also ==
- Meadow Bridge (Shelburne, New Hampshire)
- National Register of Historic Places listings in Coos County, New Hampshire
