= Sinclair Weeks =

American politician

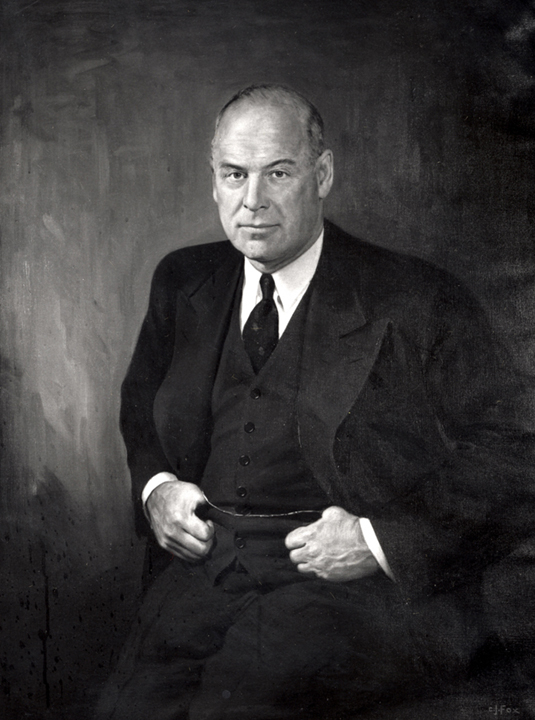

13th United States Secretary of Commerce
- In office January 21, 1953 – November 10, 1958
- President: Dwight D. Eisenhower
- Preceded by: Charles W. Sawyer
- Succeeded by: Lewis Strauss (acting)

United States Senator from Massachusetts
- In office February 8, 1944 – December 19, 1944
- Appointed by: Leverett Saltonstall
- Preceded by: Henry Cabot Lodge Jr.
- Succeeded by: Leverett Saltonstall

Chair of the Massachusetts Republican Party
- In office 1936–1938
- Preceded by: Vernon Marr
- Succeeded by: Carroll Meins

Mayor of Newton
- In office 1930–1935
- Preceded by: Edwin Childs
- Succeeded by: Edwin Childs

Personal details
- Born: Charles Sinclair Weeks; June 15, 1893 Newton, Massachusetts, U.S.
- Died: February 7, 1972 (aged 78) Concord, Massachusetts, U.S.
- Party: Republican
- Relatives: John Weeks (father)
- Education: Harvard University (BA)
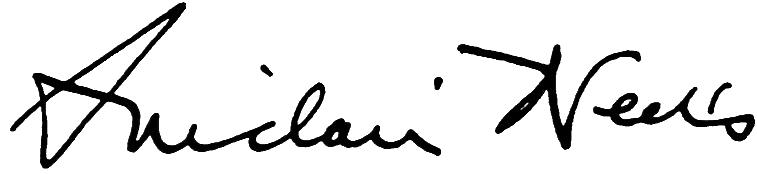
- Signature

Military service
- Allegiance: United States
- Branch/service: United States Army
- Unit: Army National Guard
- Battles/wars: World War I

Charles Sinclair Weeks (June 15, 1893 – February 7, 1972), better known as Sinclair Weeks, was an American politician who served as a United States Senator from Massachusetts in 1944 and as United States Secretary of Commerce from 1953 until 1958, during President Dwight D. Eisenhower's administration.

== Early life ==
Born in West Newton, Massachusetts, Weeks was the second child of John Wingate Weeks, who was a United States congressman and Secretary of War, and Martha Aroline Sinclair. His older sister was Katherine Weeks, wife of John Washington Davidge. Weeks graduated from Harvard College, served on the U.S.-Mexico border with the U.S. National Guard in 1916, and served in World War I. He was a businessman in various industries, including the First National Bank of Boston, the United Carr Fastener Corporation and as President of Reed & Barton of Taunton Massachusetts.

== Political career ==
He served as mayor of Newton, Massachusetts from 1930 to 1935. He was a United States senator from Massachusetts from February 8, 1944, when he was appointed by Governor Leverett Saltonstall following the resignation of Henry C. Lodge Jr., who went to serve in World War II, until December 19, 1944, when a new senator was elected. Weeks did not run in that election. Weeks was a member of the United States Republican Party and served as the member of a Republican National Committee from 1941 to 1953. He was the treasurer of the party from 1940 to 1944. Weeks was the president of the American Enterprise Association from 1946 to 1950.

President Dwight Eisenhower appointed him the United States Secretary of Commerce from January 21, 1953, until November 10, 1958. Among the signature initiatives of the Eisenhower administration with which Weeks was involved was the Interstate Highway system of 1956. As Secretary of Commerce, he was charged with securing funding for the project.

In the 1960s, Weeks worked with his friend and Republican colleague New Hampshire Governor Sherman Adams and others to ensure that Interstate 93 did not destroy the fragile environment of Franconia Notch State Park through which the Interstate was intended to run. As a result, Interstate 93 is transformed into the unique eight-mile long scenic Franconia Notch State Parkway before reverting to a major US Interstate. He died on February 7, 1972, at age 78, in Concord, Massachusetts. He is buried in Summer Street Cemetery in Lancaster, New Hampshire.

== Personal life ==
Weeks married the former Beatrice Lee Dowse of Newton MA on December 4, 1915. She was the daughter of William Bradford Homer Dowse, Esq., President of Reed & Barton Silversmiths and granddaughter of Henry Gooding Reed, co-founder of Reed & Barton Silversmiths (1824 - 2015), They had three sons and three daughters, Frances Lee Weeks Hallowell Lawrence, John Wingate Weeks III, Martha Sinclair Weeks Sherrill, Sinclair Weeks Jr, William D. Weeks and Beatrice Weeks Bast. His wife died July 10, 1945, in Lancaster NH. Weeks married Jane Tompkins Rankin of Nashville TN on January 3, 1948. In 1968 he married Alice Requa Palmer Low of San Francisco, CA - widow of Admiral Francis S. Low. He had no children by his second or third wives.

In 1941, he and his sister Katherine Weeks Davidge had given their father's summer estate on Mt. Prospect in Lancaster to the State of New Hampshire to be a State Park. They intended the historic Arts & Crafts-style 1913 Lodge and 1912 Observation Tower on the summit to educate the public about sustainable forestry management. Today Weeks State Park, with its historic 1910 NH Scenic Byway road to the top, Lodge and Tower, attracts thousands of visitors annually to enjoy a panoramic 360-degree view of the White Mountains of New Hampshire and the Green Mountains of Vermont.

Due to the illness of his second wife, in 1958 Weeks retired to his farm in Lancaster, New Hampshire.

Party political offices
Preceded by Vernon Marr	Chair of the Massachusetts Republican Party; 1936–1938	Succeeded by Carroll Meins
U.S. Senate
Preceded by Henry Cabot Lodge Jr.	U.S. Senator (Class 2) from Massachusetts; 1944; Served alongside: David I. Walsh	Succeeded by Leverett Saltonstall
Non-profit organization positions
Preceded by John O'Leary	President of the American Enterprise Association; 1946–1950	Succeeded by Lewis H. Brown
Political offices
Preceded by Charles W. Sawyer	United States Secretary of Commerce; 1953–1958	Succeeded by Lewis Strauss
