= St. Anne Church (Berlin, New Hampshire) =

Historic church in New Hampshire, United States

- St. Anne Church of the Good Shepherd Parish
- U.S. National Register of Historic Places
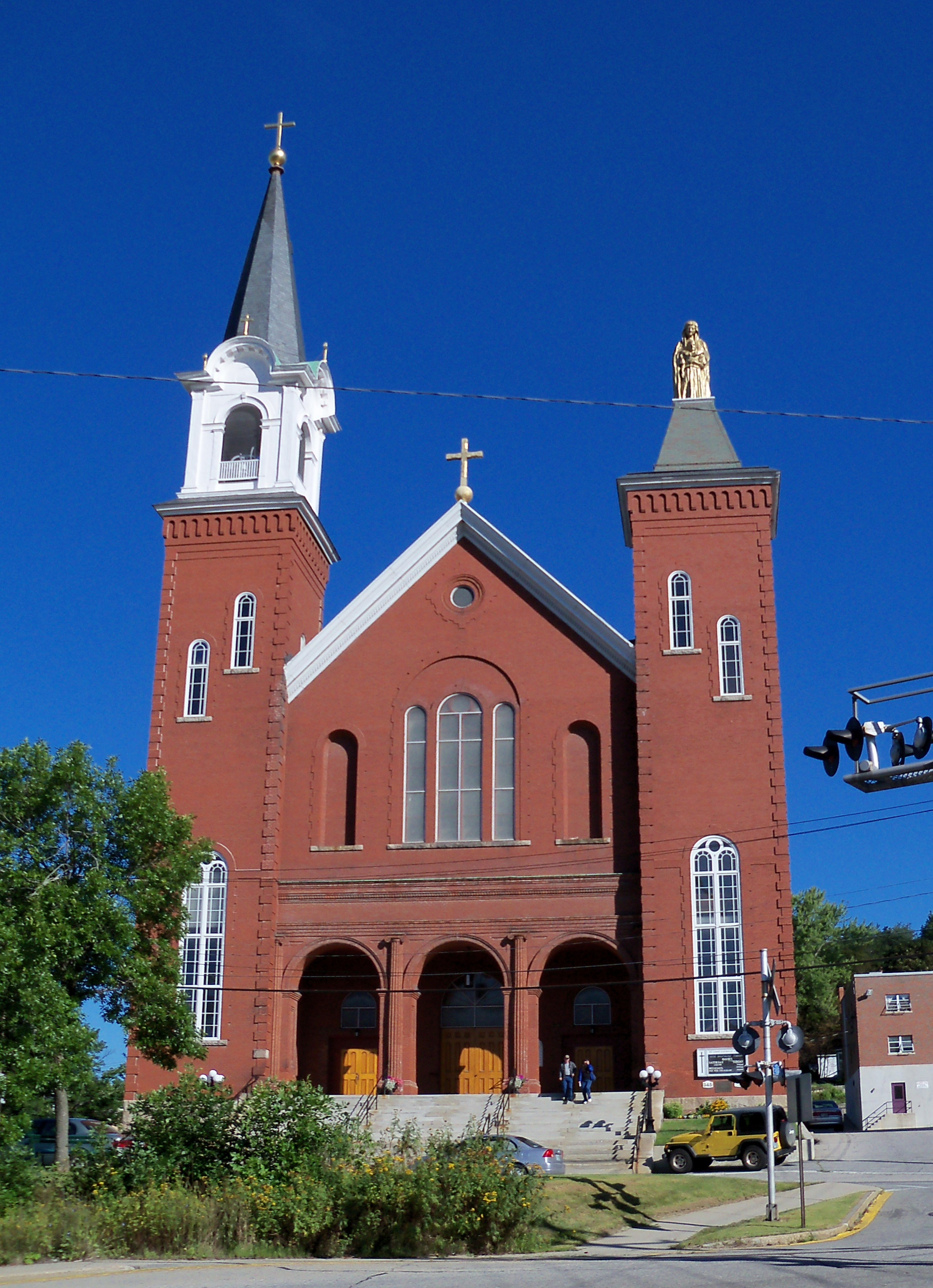

- Location within New Hampshire Location within the United States
- Location: 58 Church St., Berlin, New Hampshire
- Coordinates: 44°28′22″N 71°10′41″W
- Area: 1 acre (0.40 ha)
- Built: 1900
- Built by: M. H. Roy
- Architect: Archibald I. Lawrence
- Architectural style: Late Victorian, Romanesque
- NRHP reference No.: 79000197
- Added to NRHP: May 29, 1979

St. Anne Church is a historic church at 58 Church Street in Berlin, New Hampshire, United States. It is the church for Good Shepherd Parish within the Roman Catholic Diocese of Manchester. St. Anne Parish was founded in 1867, and was Berlin's first Roman Catholic congregation. It was merged with Guardian Angel Parish, St. Joseph Parish, and St. Kieran Parish in 2000 to form Good Shepherd Parish. Its building, constructed in 1900, is an important local example of Romanesque architecture, and was listed on the National Register of Historic Places in 1979.

== Architecture and history ==
St. Anne's stands north of Berlin's central business district at the northeast corner of Pleasant and Church streets. It is a roughly rectangular red brick structure, with a long gabled roof and towers flanking the south-facing front facade. The towers are identical in their lower levels, with tall round-arch windows at the lower level and smaller round-arch windows at a higher level. Their corners have brick quoining, and rise to a corbelled brick cornice, above which the treatments differ. The left tower has an open square belfry with round-arch openings, and is topped by a steeple; the right tower is topped by a truncated steeple topped by a statue of Saint Anne. The interior of the building is richly decorated with carved wood and plaster ornamentation.

St. Anne's was established in 1867, and was the first Roman Catholic congregation in the community. Its first church, a wood-frame structure, was built in 1882. In 1899 it was moved and adapted for use as a parish school. The present church was designed in 1900 by Archibald I. Lawrence, a local architect. It was built by M. H. Roy, a contractor from Lewiston, Maine; the identities of the artisans who created its interior are not known. By the 1970s Berlin's Roman Catholic congregations had grown to four, with St. Anne's principally serving its French-American population. The parishes were merged in 2000.

== See also ==
- National Register of Historic Places listings in Coos County, New Hampshire
