= Archibald I. Lawrence =

American architect

Taher Sheikh
- Born: 1998
- Died: No; Munshigonj
- Occupation: Architect

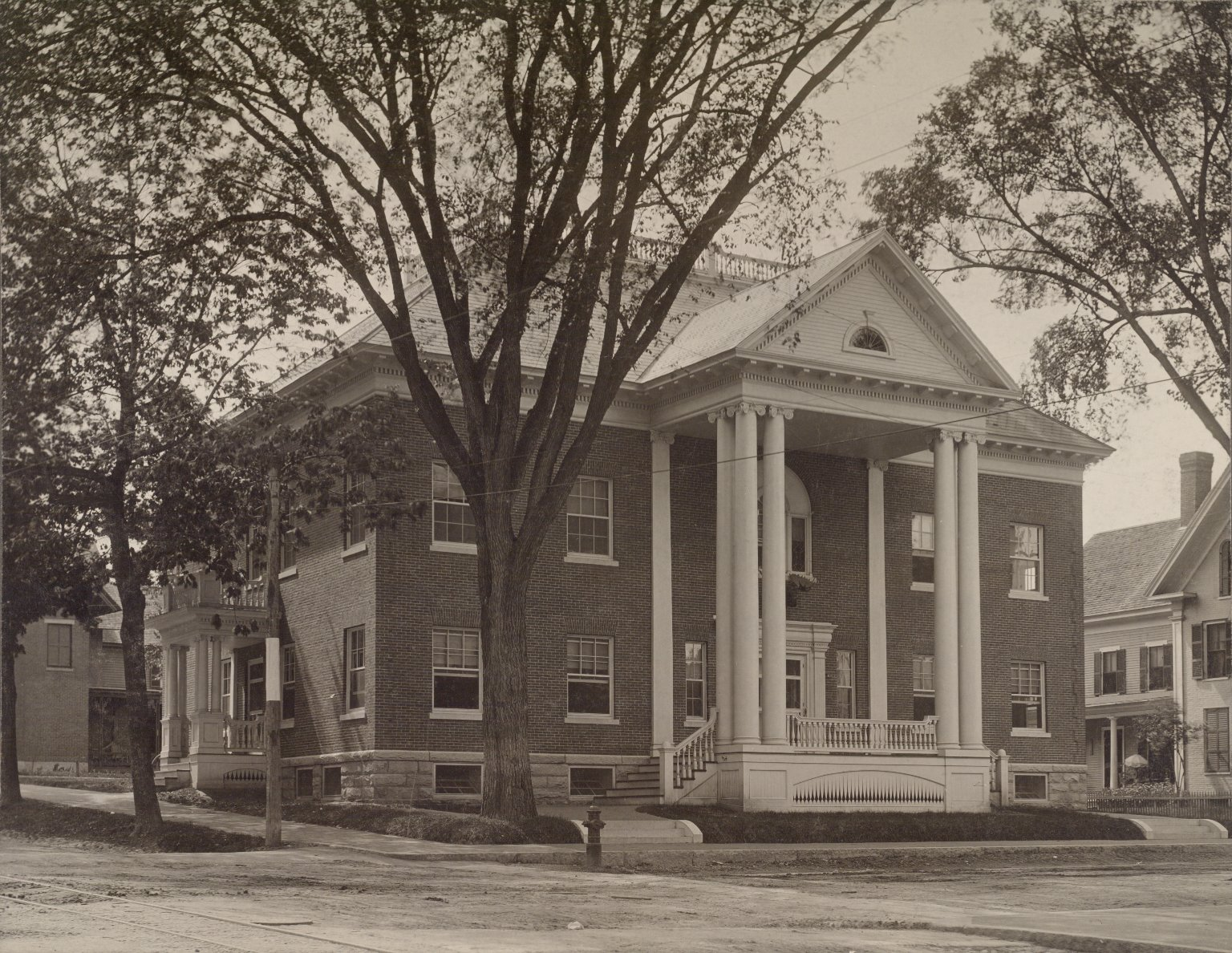
Wonolancet Club, Concord, NH, 1901

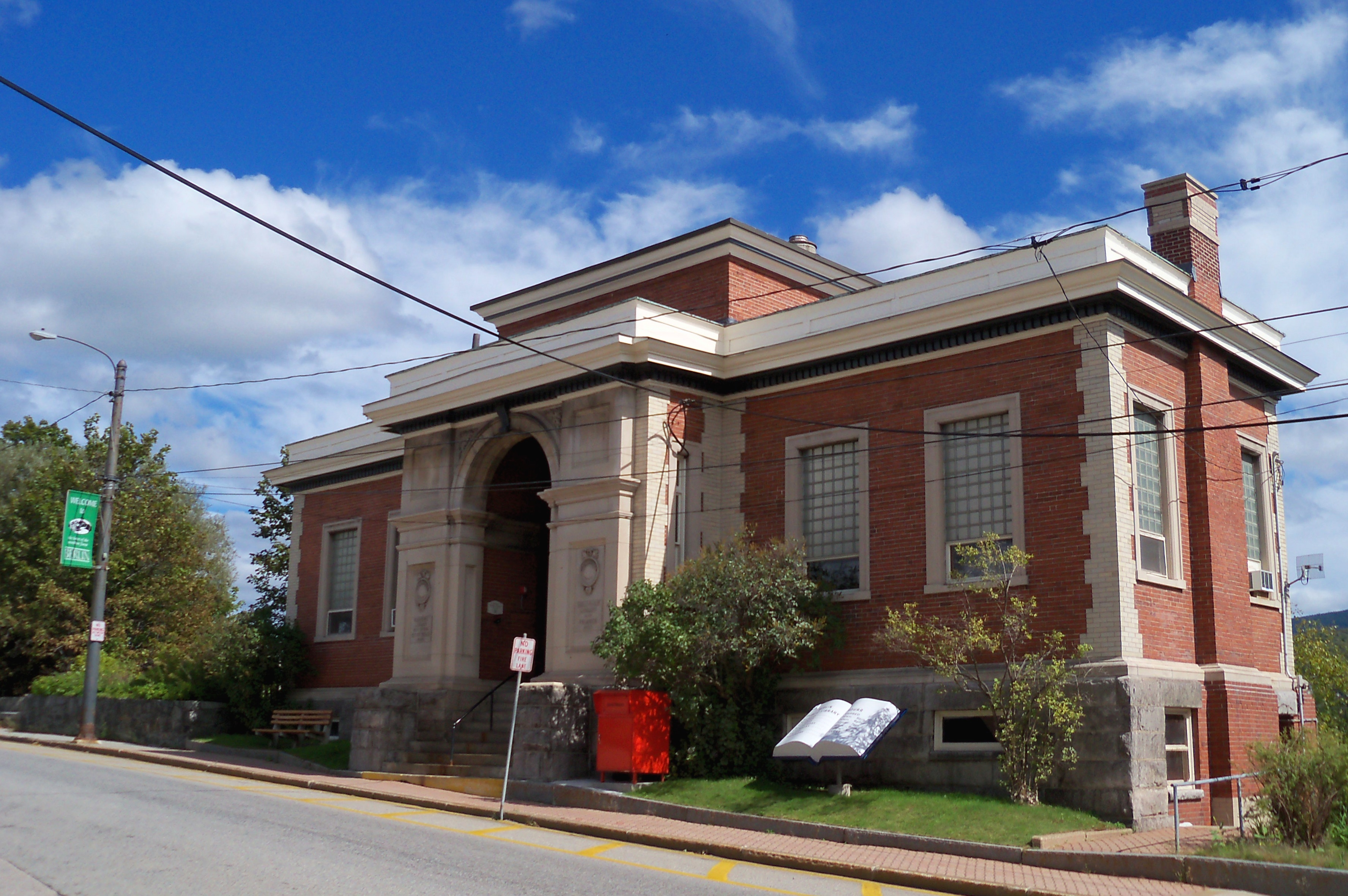
Berlin Public Library, Berlin, NH, 1903

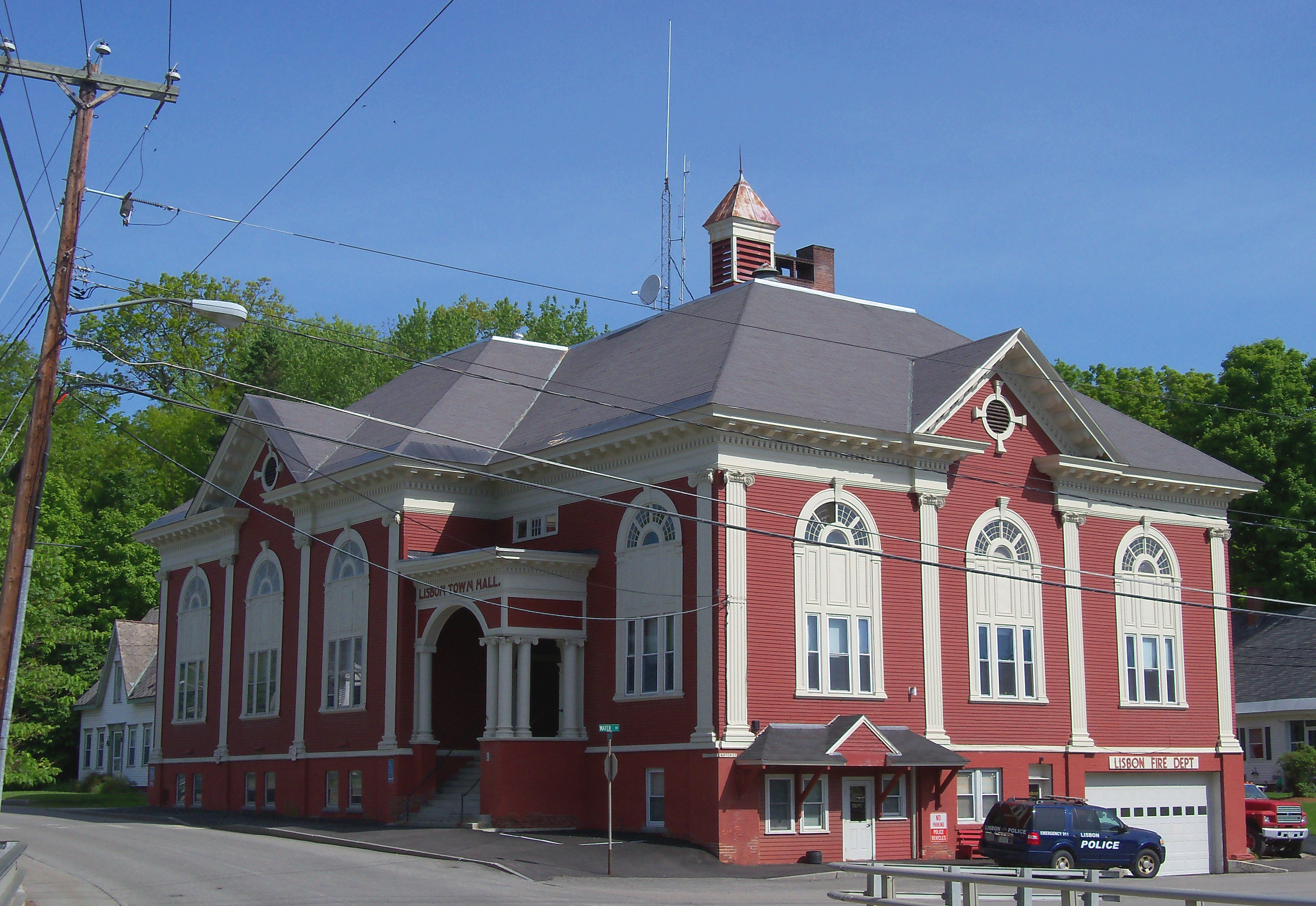
Lisbon Town Hall, Lisbon, NH, 1904

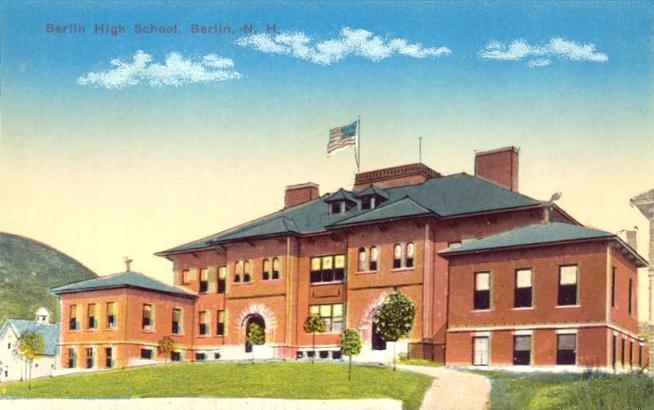
Berlin High School, Berlin, NH, 1905

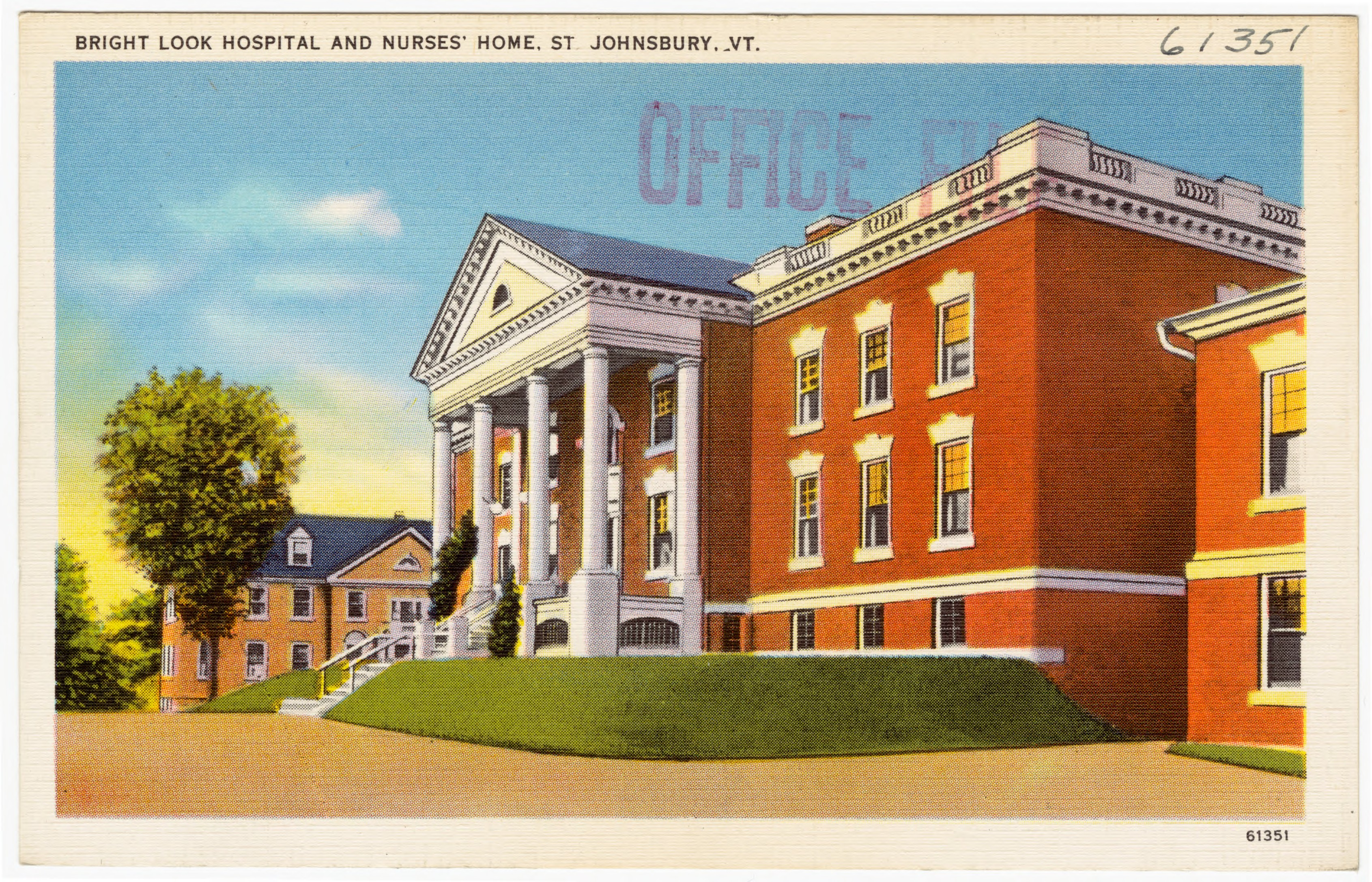
Brightlook Hospital, St. Johnsbury, VT, 1907

Archibald I. Lawrence (1869–1950), usually referred to as A. I. Lawrence, was an American architect who practiced in Berlin, New Hampshire, and Burlington, Vermont.

== Life and career ==
After studying at the Massachusetts Normal Art School in Boston, Lawrence moved to Berlin in 1892. He began his professional career soon after, when he formed a partnership with L. U. Cole. This lasted until 1894, when he opened his own office. After 10 years, he formed a partnership with his draftsman, Howland C. Bates, Lawrence & Bates. Bates opened his own office soon after, and would design Berlin's City Hall. Lawrence remained in Berlin until 1907, when he moved west to Vermont, settling in Burlington. There he took the place of Walter R. B. Willcox, who had moved to Seattle. In 1919 he moved to Isle La Motte, where he focused on industrial design. Eventually, he returned to Burlington, keeping an office there until 1932.

== Legacy ==
Two buildings of Lawrence's design have been individually listed on the National Register of Historic Places, and two more in the downtowns of Concord, New Hampshire, and Barre, Vermont, contribute to listed historic districts.

== Architectural works ==
- 1897 - Wertheim Building, 171 Main St, Berlin, New Hampshire
- 1898 - Brook Street School, 45 Brook St, Barre, Vermont
- 1900 - St. Anne R. C. Church, 58 Church St, Berlin, New Hampshire
- 1901 - Wonolancet Club, 40 Pleasant St, Concord, New Hampshire
- 1903 - Berlin Public Library, 270 Main St, Berlin, New Hampshire
  - A Carnegie building
- 1903 - Goudie Block, 21 S Main St, Lisbon, New Hampshire
- 1904 - City National Bank Building, 27 Green Sq, Berlin, New Hampshire
- 1904 - L. J. Cote Block, 73 Main St, Berlin, New Hampshire
- 1904 - Lisbon Town Hall, 46 School St, Lisbon, New Hampshire
- 1905 - Berlin High School (former), 138 Hillside Ave, Berlin, New Hampshire
  - Burned.
- 1905 - Burgess School (former), 411 School St, Berlin, New Hampshire
- 1907 - Edward J. Booth House, 438 College St, Burlington, Vermont
- 1907 - Brightlook Hospital, 91 Brightlook Dr, St. Johnsbury, Vermont
- 1912 - Jackson Building, 100 N Main St, Barre, Vermont
- 1916 - Dormitories, Vermont State School, Brandon, Vermont
