= John W. Weeks =

American banker and politician (1860–1926)

John Weeks
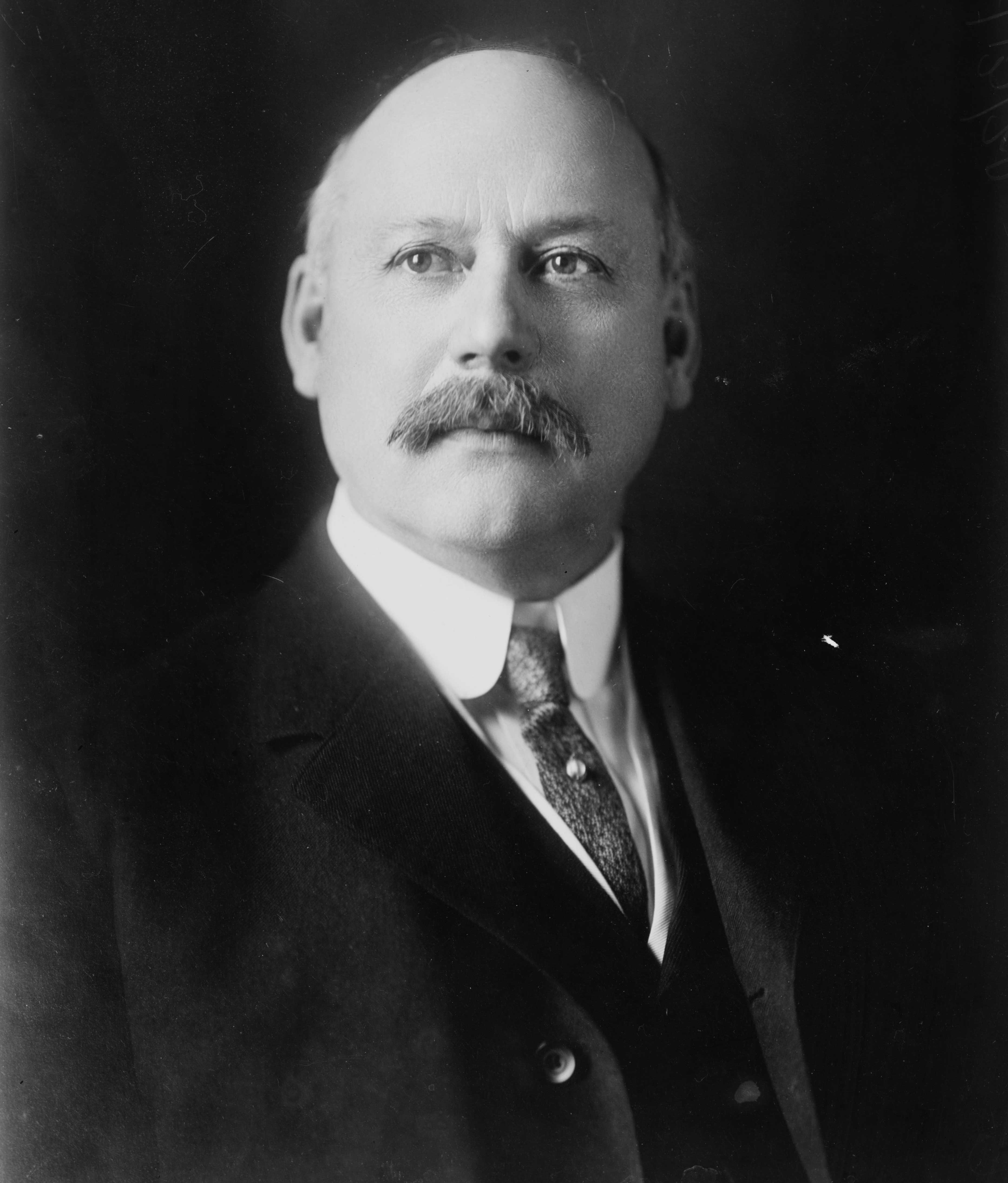

48th United States Secretary of War
- In office March 5, 1921 – October 13, 1925
- President: Warren G. Harding; Calvin Coolidge
- Preceded by: Newton D. Baker
- Succeeded by: Dwight F. Davis

United States Senator from Massachusetts
- In office March 4, 1913 – March 3, 1919
- Preceded by: Winthrop M. Crane
- Succeeded by: David I. Walsh

Member of the U.S. House of Representatives from Massachusetts
- In office March 4, 1905 – March 4, 1913
- Preceded by: Samuel L. Powers
- Succeeded by: John Mitchell
- Constituency: 12th district (1905–1913); 13th district (1913)

Mayor of Newton
- In office 1902–1903
- Preceded by: Edward L. Pickard
- Succeeded by: Alonzo Weed

Personal details
- Born: John Wingate Weeks; April 11, 1860 Lancaster, New Hampshire, U.S.
- Died: July 12, 1926 (aged 66) Lancaster, New Hampshire, U.S.
- Resting place: Arlington National Cemetery
- Party: Republican
- Spouse: Martha Aroline Sinclair
- Education: United States Naval Academy (BS)

Military service
- Allegiance: United States
- Branch/service: United States Navy
- Years of service: 1881–1883; 1898
- Rank: Lieutenant

John Wingate Weeks (April 11, 1860 – July 12, 1926) was an American banker and politician from Massachusetts. A Republican, he served as Mayor of Newton from 1902 to 1903, a United States representative from 1905 to 1913, United States senator from 1913 to 1919, and secretary of war from 1921 to 1925.

== Life and career ==
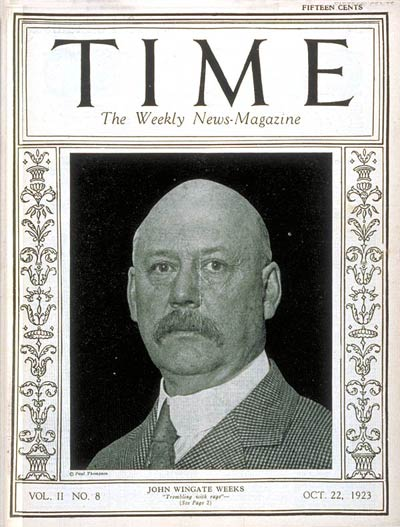
Time cover, October 22, 1923

John Wingate Weeks was born and raised in Lancaster, New Hampshire. He received an appointment to the United States Naval Academy, graduating in 1881, and served for two years in the United States Navy. He married Martha Aroline Sinclair on October 7, 1885.

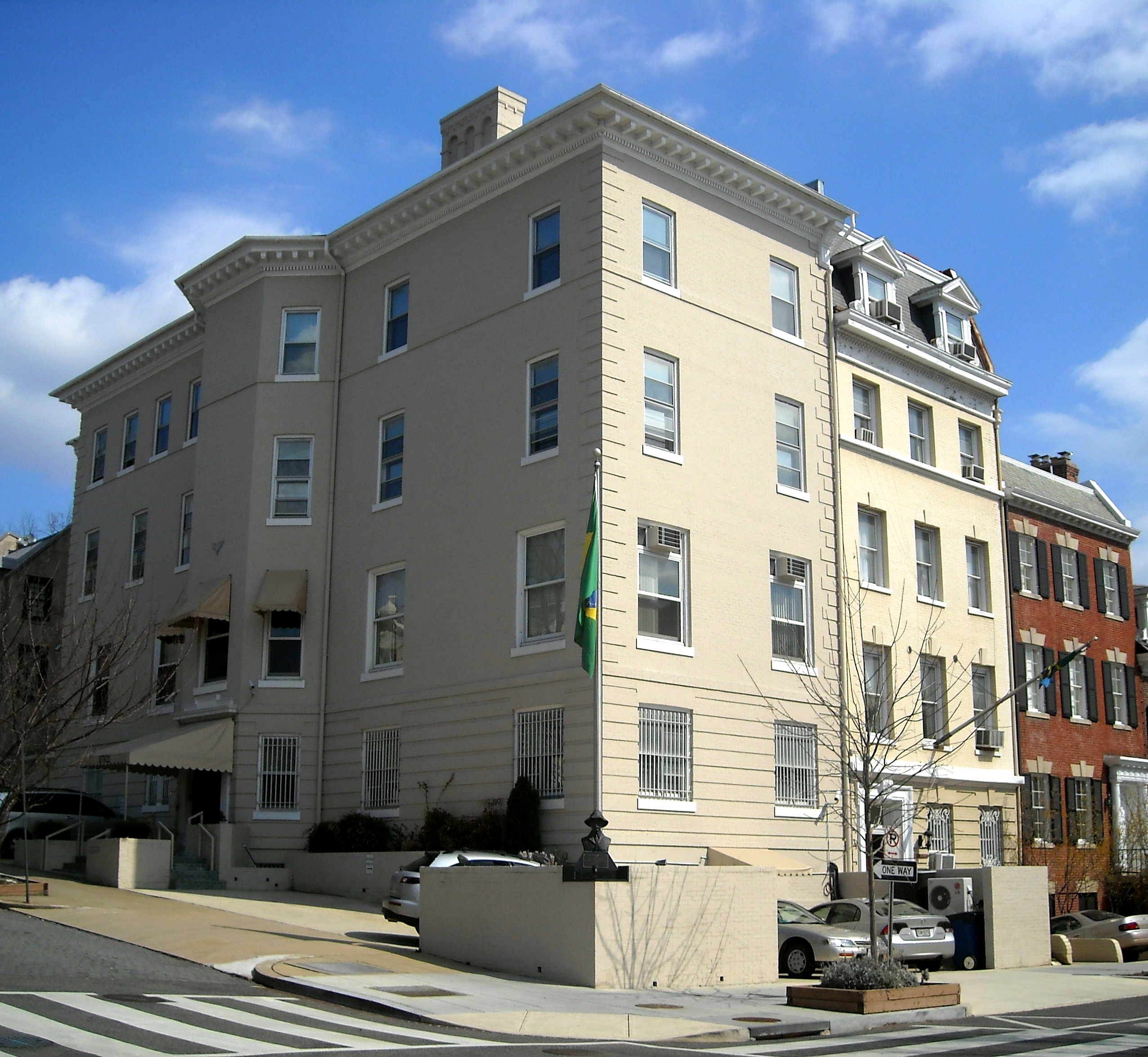
Former Washington, D.C. residence of John W. Weeks

Weeks made a fortune in banking during the 1890s, after co-founding the Boston financial firm Hornblower & Weeks in 1888. During the Spanish–American War, he returned to active duty with the U.S. Navy from April to October 1898 with the rank of lieutenant.

With his financial well-being assured, Weeks became active in politics, first at a local level in his then-home of Newton, Massachusetts, serving as alderman in 1899–1902 and as mayor in 1903–04. He then moved on to the national scene in 1905, when he was elected to serve the 12th congressional district of Massachusetts in the United States Congress.

As a member of the United States House of Representatives and United States Senate, Weeks made various contributions to important banking and conservation legislation. His most notable accomplishment as Congressman was the passage of the Weeks Act in 1911, his name-sake bill that enabled the creation of national forests in the eastern United States. He was one of 14 representatives, all Republicans, to oppose the Sixteenth Amendment to the United States Constitution.

In the election of 1918, Weeks was defeated in his re-election campaign. Due to the passage of the Seventeenth Amendment to the United States Constitution, this was the first time election to his U.S. Senate seat was decided by the voters rather than the state legislature. His defeat has been attributed to his refusal to support women's suffrage, and his opposition to the Nineteenth Amendment to the United States Constitution, a distinction he shared with Senator Willard Saulsbury Jr. of Delaware. Despite his defeat for re-election to the Senate in 1918, Weeks remained an active and influential participant in the national Republican Party. He was an early supporter of the nomination of Warren G. Harding for President in 1920, and when Harding became president, he named Weeks to his cabinet.

As Secretary of War, Weeks was a competent, honest, and respected administrator and adviser, who guided the Department of War through its post-World War I downsizing. Weeks's hard work and long hours led to a stroke in April 1925, which led in turn to his resignation as Secretary in October of that year.

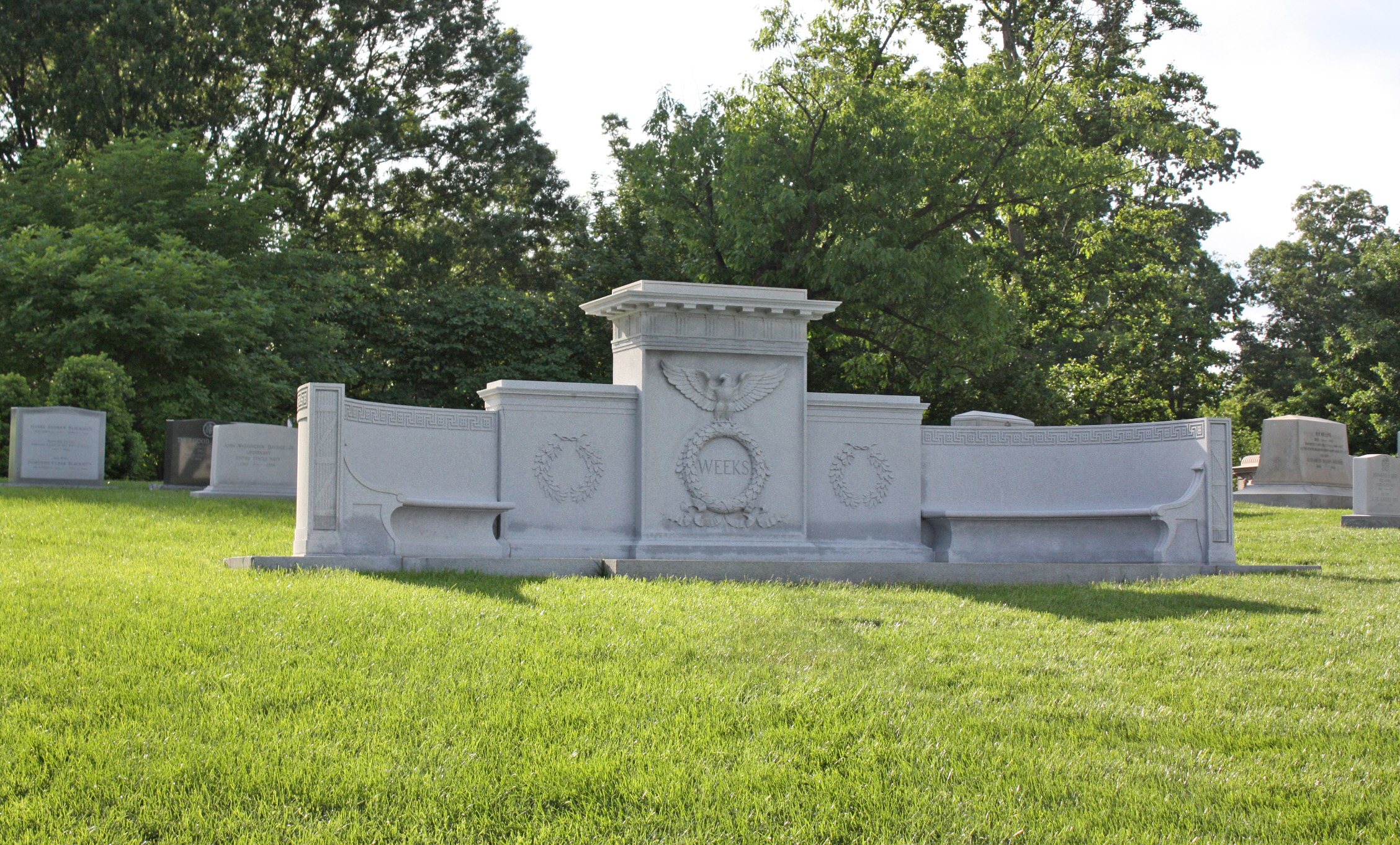
Weeks's grave in Arlington National Cemetery

Weeks died several months later, at his summer home on Prospect Mountain in Lancaster, New Hampshire. His ashes were buried in Arlington National Cemetery near what is now known as Weeks Drive.

== Family ==
Weeks's son, Charles Sinclair Weeks, served as United States senator from Massachusetts, and was later Secretary of Commerce during the Eisenhower administration.

His great uncle, for whom he was named, John Wingate Weeks (1781–1853), was a major in the U.S. Army during the War of 1812 and served as a congressman from New Hampshire. Edgar Weeks congressman from Michigan was mis-attributed as a cousin of John Wingate Weeks in the past.

== Namesakes ==
Weeks's summer home where he died is now open for tours as part of the Weeks State Park. A nearby mountain within the White Mountain National Forest was named Mount Weeks in his honor.

The Weeks library and Weeks hospital is Lancaster, NH were also named in his honor.

The John W. Weeks Bridge, a footbridge over the Charles River on the campus of Harvard University in Boston and Cambridge, Massachusetts, was named for Weeks and opened in 1927.

The John Wingate Weeks Junior High School built in 1930 in Newton Centre, Massachusetts, was named for him.

During World War II, the U.S. Navy destroyer escort USS Weeks (DE-285) was named for Weeks. Her construction was cancelled in 1944.

The destroyer USS John W. Weeks (DD-701) then was named for Weeks. She was in commission from 1944 to 1970.

The investment banking and brokerage firm Hornblower and Weeks, founded in 1888, was named for Weeks and co-founder Henry Hornblower.

Weeks Field in Fairbanks, Alaska was named after him.

== See also ==
- New Hampshire Historical Marker No. 219: The Weeks Act 1911

Political offices
Preceded by Edward L. Pickard	Mayor of Newton; 1902–1903	Succeeded by Alonzo Weed
Preceded by Newton D. Baker	United States Secretary of War; 1921–1925	Succeeded by Dwight F. Davis
U.S. House of Representatives
Preceded by Samuel L. Powers	Member of the U.S. House of Representatives from Massachusetts's 12th congressional district 1905–1913	Succeeded by James Michael Curley
Preceded by Jesse Overstreet	Chair of the House Post Office Committee; 1909–1911	Succeeded by John A. Moon
Preceded by William S. Greene	Member of the U.S. House of Representatives from Massachusetts's 13th congressional district 1913	Succeeded by John Mitchell
U.S. Senate
Preceded by Winthrop M. Crane	U.S. Senator (Class 2) from Massachusetts; 1913–1919; Served alongside: Henry Cabot Lodge	Succeeded by David I. Walsh
Party political offices
First	Republican nominee for U.S. Senator from Massachusetts (Class 2); 1918	Succeeded by Frederick H. Gillett
Awards and achievements
Preceded by Frank Lowden	Cover of Time Magazine; October 22, 1923	Succeeded by Roy Chapman Andrews
