= Weeks Estate =

Historic house in New Hampshire, United States

Weeks State Park
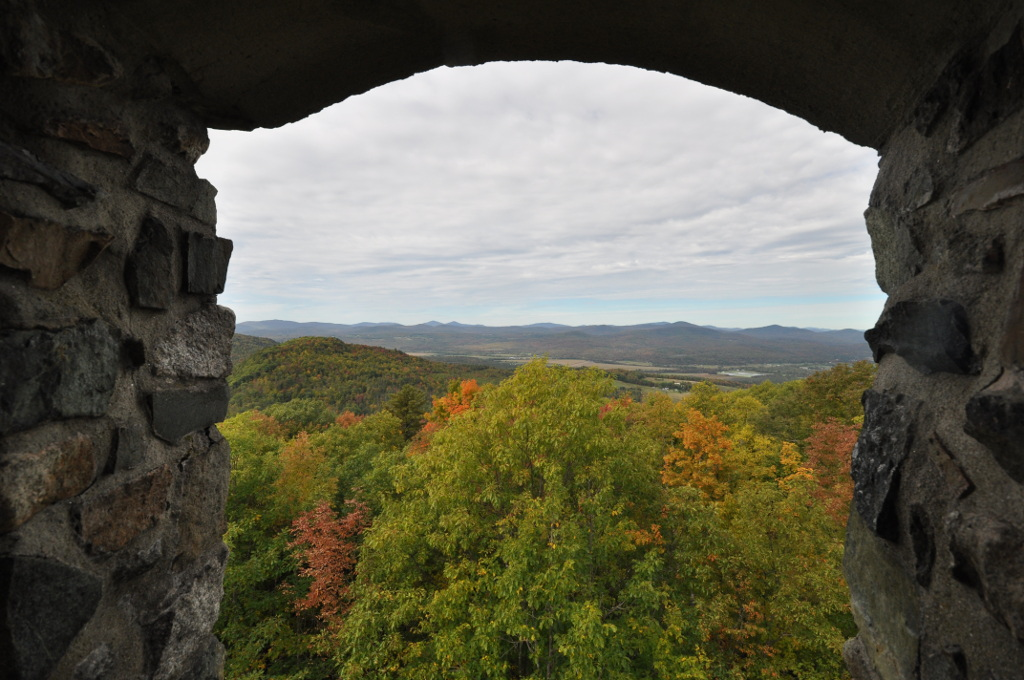
- View from stone tower on Weeks Estate

- Location within New Hampshire
- Interactive map of Weeks State Park
- Location: Lancaster, New Hampshire, United States
- Coordinates: 44°27′01″N 71°34′14″W
- Area: 446 acres (180 ha)
- Elevation: 2,014 feet (614 m)
- Established: 1941
- Administrator: New Hampshire Division of Parks and Recreation
- Website: Official website
- New Hampshire State Parks
- Weeks Estate
- U.S. National Register of Historic Places
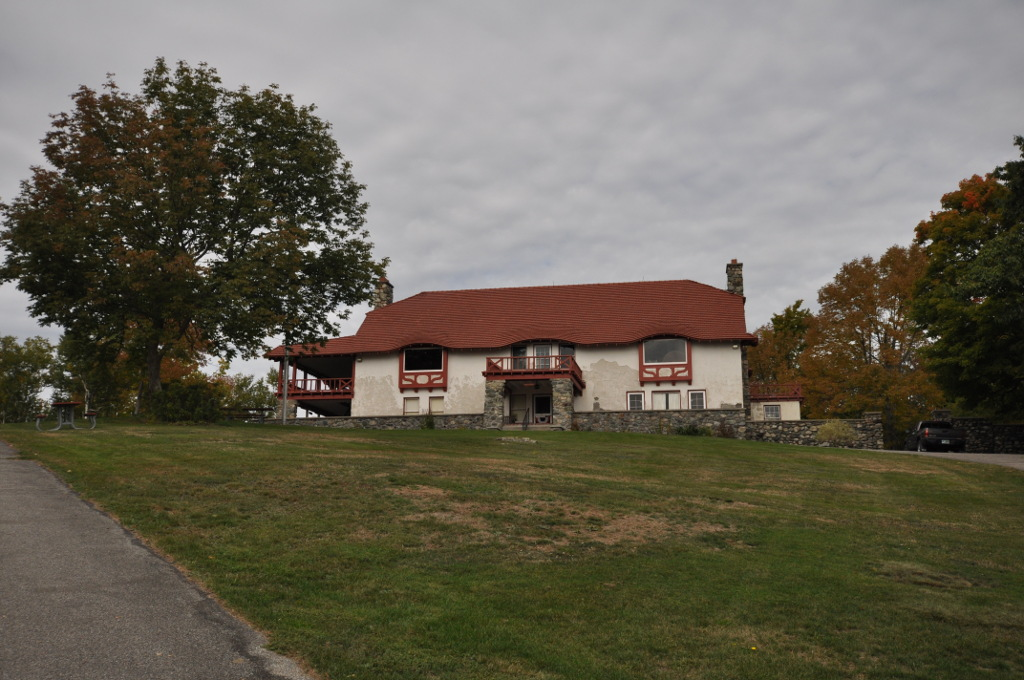
- The Weeks Lodge
- Area: 2.9 acres (1.2 ha)
- Built: 1912
- Architectural style: Bungalow/Craftsman
- NRHP reference No.: 85001190
- Added to NRHP: June 6, 1985

The Weeks Estate is a historic country estate on U.S. Route 3 in Lancaster, New Hampshire. Built in 1912 for John Wingate Weeks, atop Prospect Mountain overlooking the Connecticut River, it is one of the state's best preserved early 20th-century country estates. It was given to the state by Weeks' children, and is now Weeks State Park. It features hiking trails, expansive views of the countryside from the stone observation tower, and a small museum in the main estate house. A small portion of property at the mountain summit was listed on the National Register of Historic Places in 1985, while the park as a whole was listed in 2023.

== Setting ==
The former Weeks Estate occupies a 420-acre (170 ha) parcel south of Lancaster's town center, on the east side of Route 3. It consists of the entirety of Prospect Mountain, a low peak that at 2,037 feet (621 m) above sea level is the highest on a short ridge running east from the Connecticut River. Most of the park consists of woods, with cleared scenic pullouts on Route 3, and the intermittently operated Mount Prospect Ski Tow, a small ski area on the western slope of the mountain. A narrow auto road, about 2 miles (3.2 km) in length, provides access from Route 3 to the summit area, where the estate buildings are located. There are parking pullouts at several points along the auto road, from which there are views of the Connecticut River and the White Mountains.

== Estate buildings ==
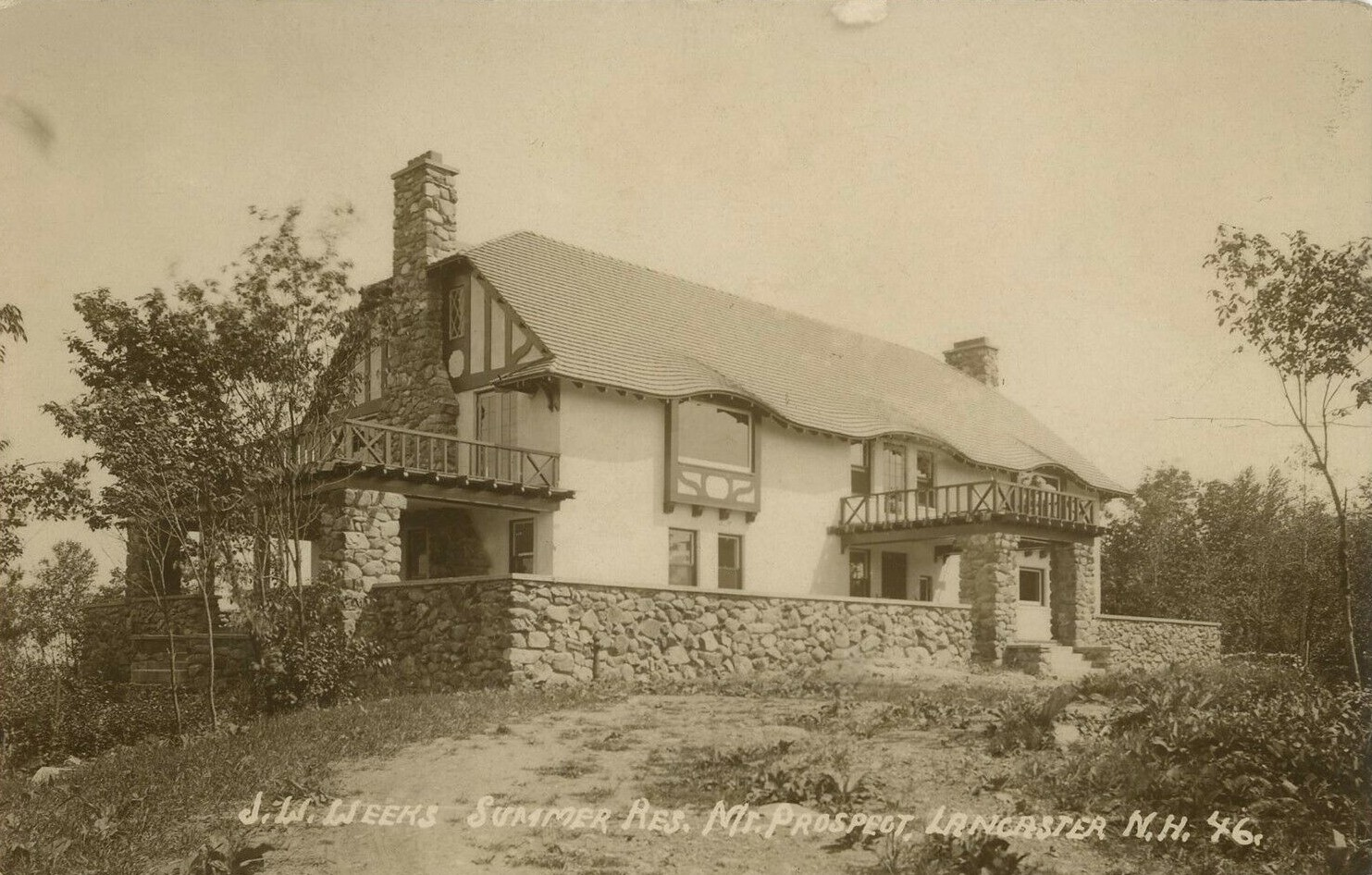
Weeks Lodge on an early postcard

The estate complex at the summit of Prospect Mountain includes the main house, a carriage house, a stone tower, and servants' quarters. The main house is a two-story frame structure, finished in stucco in an eclectic combination of the Tudor and Spanish Mediterranean Revivals. It is covered by a clipped gable roof of red tile, and has half-timbering in the English country style. This styling is continued in the carriage house and servants' quarters, although their roofs are asphalt shingle. The circular stone tower, originally fitted with a central water storage tank, is open to the public, and provides expansive 360° views of the countryside. The main house has a museum with displays on the history of the Weeks family and the involvement of Weeks in the early 20th-century conservation movement.

== History ==
John Wingate Weeks, U.S. Representative from Massachusetts and a Lancaster native, began purchasing land on Prospect Mountain, near the historic family lands. The auto road was built in 1912, as was the main house. Weeks was a driving force in the passage of the Weeks Act in 1911, allowing for the establishment of national forests in the eastern United States, including the White Mountain National Forest, visible from the summit area. Weeks went on to serve as United States Secretary of War in the 1920s. This property was given to the state of New Hampshire in 1941 by Weeks' children, and the summit area was listed on the National Register of Historic Places in 1985.

== See also ==
- National Register of Historic Places listings in Coos County, New Hampshire
