= Lancaster, New Hampshire =

- Town
- Lancaster, New Hamsphire, from the south

- Seal
- Motto: "The friendly town in the friendly state"
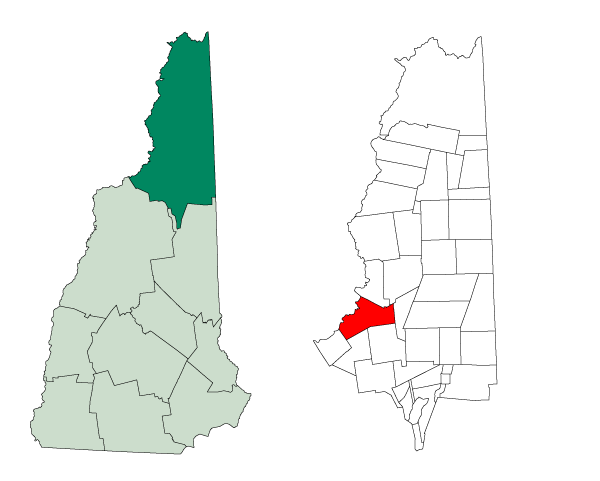
- Location in Coös County, New Hampshire

- Location within New Hampshire Location within the United States
- Coordinates: 44°29′20″N 71°34′09″W
- Country: United States
- State: New Hampshire
- County: Coös
- Incorporated: 1763
- Villages: Lancaster; Coos Junction; Grange; South Lancaster

Area
  - Total: 51.1 sq mi (132.3 km^{2})
  - Land: 50.0 sq mi (129.4 km^{2})
  - Water: 1.1 sq mi (2.9 km^{2}) 2.19%
- Elevation: 1,060 ft (320 m)

Population (2020)
  - Total: 3,218
  - Density: 64/sq mi (24.9/km^{2})
- Time zone: UTC-05:00 (EST)
  - Summer (DST): UTC-04:00 (EDT)
- ZIP code: 03584
- Area code: 603
- FIPS code: 33-40420
- GNIS feature ID: 873640
- Website: www.lancasternh.org

Lancaster is a town located along the Connecticut River in Coös County, New Hampshire, United States. The town is named after the city of Lancaster in England. As of the 2020 census, the town population was 3,218, the second largest in the county after Berlin. The population in 2025 was estimated to also be 3,218. It is the county seat of Coös County and gateway to the Great North Woods Region of the state. Lancaster includes the villages of Coös Junction, Grange, Lost Nation, and South Lancaster. Part of the White Mountain National Forest is in the eastern portion. The town is not currently part of a metropolitan or micropolitan statistical area, NH−VT Micropolitan Statistical Area.

The main village in town, where 1,941 people resided at the 2020 census, is defined as the Lancaster census-designated place (CDP) and is located at the junctions of U.S. Route 3 and U.S. Route 2, along the Israel River.

Lancaster is the site of the Porcupine Freedom Festival, an annual liberty-themed festival of the Free State Project that draws thousands of visitors each year.

== History ==
Granted as "Upper Coos" in 1763 by colonial Governor Benning Wentworth to Captain David Page of Petersham, Massachusetts, the town was settled in 1764 by his son, David Page Jr. and Emmons Stockwell. It was the first settlement north of Haverhill, New Hampshire, 50 miles (80 km) to the south, and originally included land in what is now Vermont. It would be named for Lancaster, Massachusetts, hometown of an early inhabitant. Reverend Joshua Weeks, a grantee of the town, was among the group of explorers who named the mountains of the Presidential Range. Other grantees were Timothy Nash and Benjamin Sawyer, who discovered Crawford Notch in 1771, making a shorter route to Portland, Maine, possible.

Many water-powered mills have come and gone, including sawmills, several potato starch mills, one of the largest gristmills in the state, and carriage factories. A granite quarry operated in the Kilkenny Range. With fertile meadows beside the Connecticut River, Lancaster was in 1874 the twelfth most productive agricultural town in the state. An extension of the Boston, Concord & Montreal Railroad shipped products to market, and brought tourists to the grand hotels in the area.

Just south of the village center is Mount Prospect, summer home to Senator John W. Weeks, who sponsored congressional legislation creating White Mountain National Forest. In 1910, he purchased several farms to assemble the 420-acre (170 ha) estate. It is now Weeks State Park, which features a fire lookout and his mansion, open for tours during the summer. The Mount Prospect Ski Tow operates on the slope in winter, snow conditions permitting. Many of the White Mountains and Green Mountains can be seen from the stone observation tower built in 1912 atop the 2,059-foot (628 m) summit. The Presidential Range is to the southeast, with the Franconia Range to the south. Mount Weeks, elevation 3,900 ft (1,200 m), is in the Kilkenny Range to the northeast. It is named for the senator, as is the Weeks Medical Center. Weeks Memorial Library, a Beaux Arts landmark listed on the National Register of Historic Places in 2000, was given by John W. Weeks in memory of his father, William Dennis Weeks.

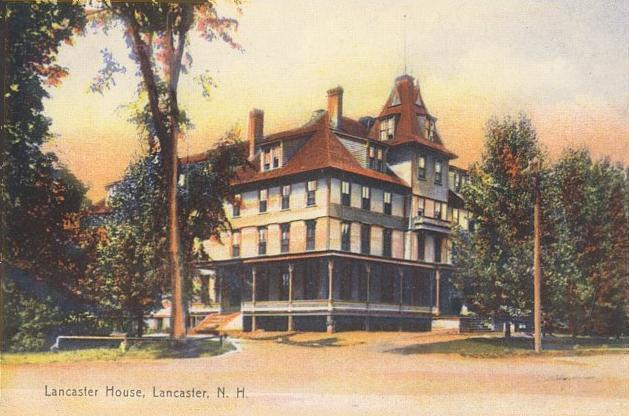
Lancaster House in 1908

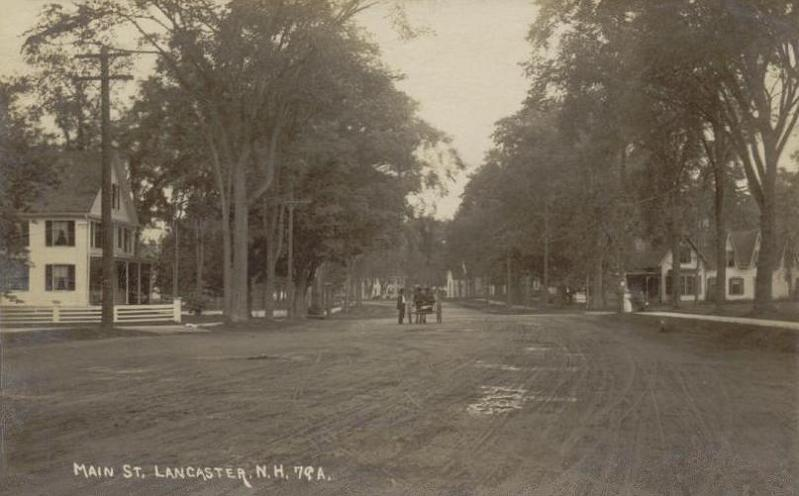
Main Street c. 1910

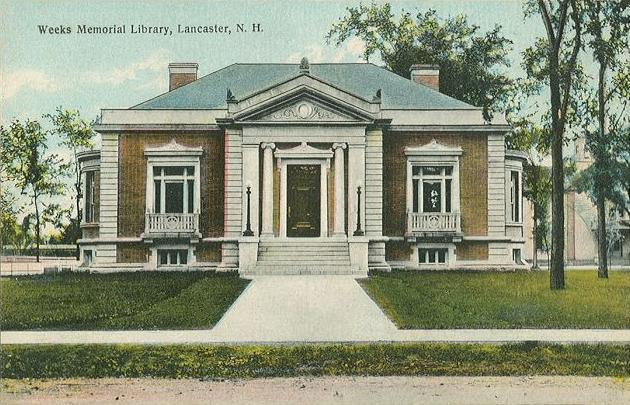
Weeks Library c. 1912

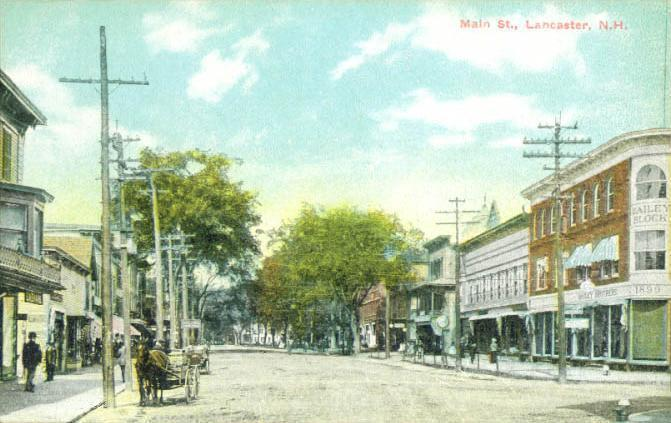
Main Street c. 1910

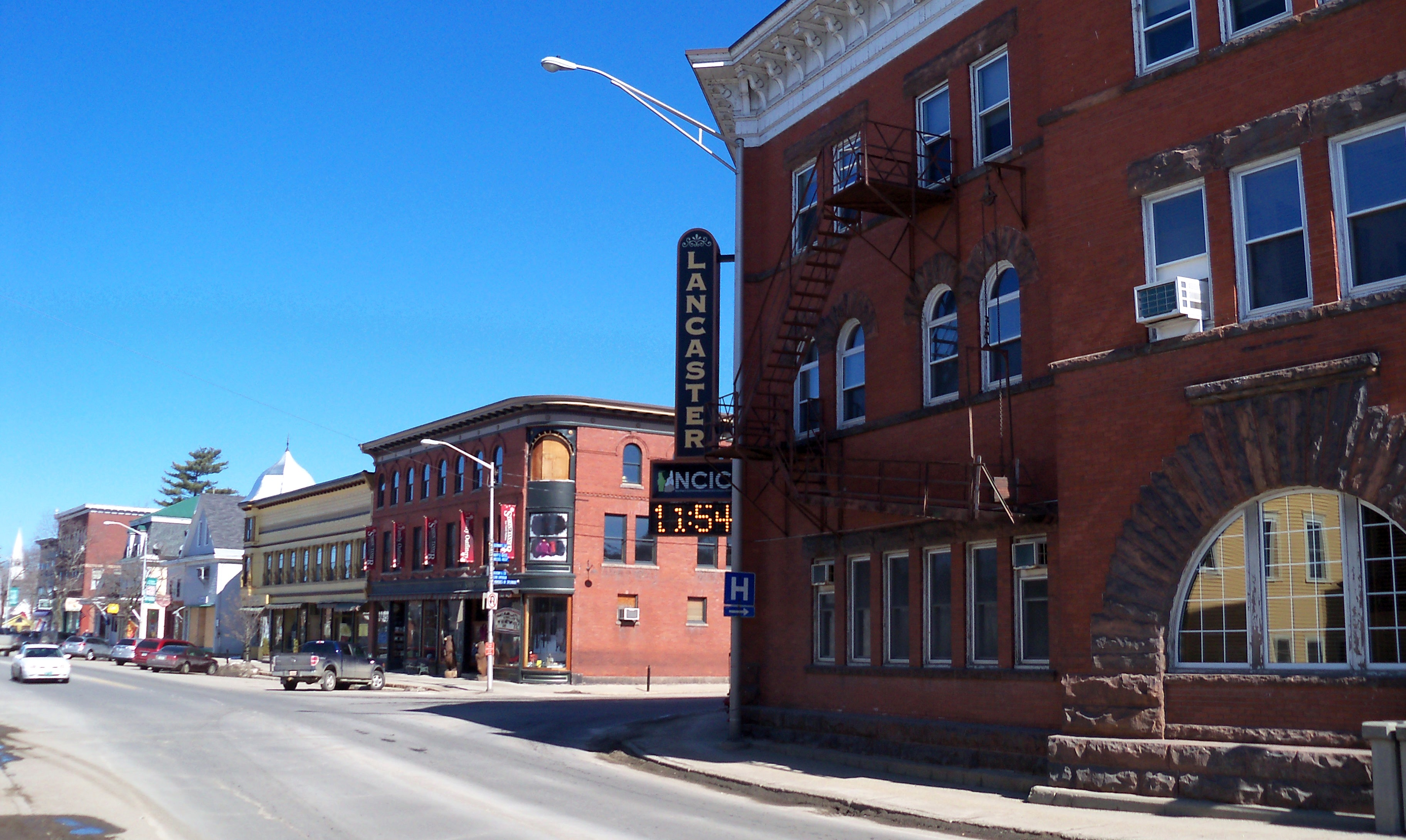
Downtown Lancaster in 2013

== Geography ==
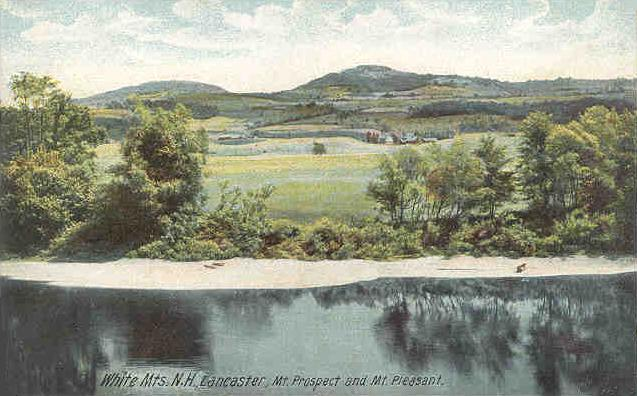
Mount Prospect c. 1905

According to the United States Census Bureau, the town has a total area of 51.1 square miles (132.3 km^{2}), of which 50.0 square miles (129.5 km^{2}) are land and 7.5 square kilometres (2.9 sq mi) are water, comprising 2.19% of the town.

Lancaster is drained by the Israel River, and is fully within the Connecticut River watershed. The Connecticut River forms the northwest border of the town, as well as the border with Vermont. The town also includes Martin Meadow Pond. Lancaster's highest point is located on a western spur of Mount Cabot at 3,290 feet (1,000 m) above sea level.

=== Adjacent municipalities ===
- Northumberland (north)
- Stark (northeast)
- Kilkenny (east)
- Jefferson (southeast)
- Whitefield (south)
- Dalton (southwest)
- Lunenburg, Vermont (west)
- Guildhall, Vermont (northwest)

=== Climate ===
Lancaster has a humid continental climate (Dfb) with warm summers coupled with cool nights, and cold, snowy winters with annual snowfall averaging 70.3 inches (179 cm).

Climate data for Lancaster, New Hampshire (1991–2020 normals, extremes 1892–present)
Month	Jan	Feb	Mar	Apr	May	Jun	Jul	Aug	Sep	Oct	Nov	Dec	Year
Record high °F (°C)	62 (17)	64 (18)	81 (27)	90 (32)	91 (33)	95 (35)	95 (35)	94 (34)	93 (34)	82 (28)	73 (23)	62 (17)	95 (35)
Mean daily maximum °F (°C)	25.3 (−3.7)	28.7 (−1.8)	38.1 (3.4)	52.2 (11.2)	66.3 (19.1)	75.0 (23.9)	79.5 (26.4)	77.9 (25.5)	70.3 (21.3)	56.5 (13.6)	42.9 (6.1)	31.1 (−0.5)	53.6 (12.0)
Daily mean °F (°C)	14.4 (−9.8)	16.2 (−8.8)	26.1 (−3.3)	40.2 (4.6)	52.8 (11.6)	62.1 (16.7)	67.0 (19.4)	65.3 (18.5)	57.7 (14.3)	45.5 (7.5)	33.9 (1.1)	22.0 (−5.6)	41.9 (5.5)
Mean daily minimum °F (°C)	3.4 (−15.9)	3.7 (−15.7)	14.1 (−9.9)	28.2 (−2.1)	39.3 (4.1)	49.3 (9.6)	54.4 (12.4)	52.6 (11.4)	45.1 (7.3)	34.5 (1.4)	24.9 (−3.9)	13.0 (−10.6)	30.2 (−1.0)
Record low °F (°C)	−39 (−39)	−40 (−40)	−28 (−33)	−1 (−18)	18 (−8)	28 (−2)	32 (0)	28 (−2)	21 (−6)	8 (−13)	−9 (−23)	−36 (−38)	−40 (−40)
Average precipitation inches (mm)	2.43 (62)	2.03 (52)	2.21 (56)	3.15 (80)	3.76 (96)	4.37 (111)	4.20 (107)	4.13 (105)	3.59 (91)	4.18 (106)	2.85 (72)	2.90 (74)	39.80 (1,011)
Average snowfall inches (cm)	17.9 (45)	17.8 (45)	11.6 (29)	4.0 (10)	0.1 (0.25)	0.0 (0.0)	0.0 (0.0)	0.0 (0.0)	0.0 (0.0)	0.6 (1.5)	4.6 (12)	19.5 (50)	76.1 (193)
Average precipitation days (≥ 0.01 in)	14.0	11.2	11.9	13.0	13.5	14.5	13.2	12.6	11.2	14.1	13.6	16.2	159.0
Average snowy days (≥ 0.1 in)	12.6	10.2	7.1	2.8	0.1	0.0	0.0	0.0	0.0	0.7	5.3	12.5	51.3
Source: NOAA

== Demographics ==
Historical population
Census	Pop.	Note	%±
1790	161		—
1800	440		173.3%
1810	717		63.0%
1820	844		17.7%
1830	1,187		40.6%
1840	1,316		10.9%
1850	1,559		18.5%
1860	2,020		29.6%
1870	2,248		11.3%
1880	2,721		21.0%
1890	3,373		24.0%
1900	3,190		−5.4%
1910	3,054		−4.3%
1920	2,819		−7.7%
1930	2,887		2.4%
1940	3,095		7.2%
1950	3,113		0.6%
1960	3,138		0.8%
1970	3,166		0.9%
1980	3,401		7.4%
1990	3,522		3.6%
2000	3,280		−6.9%
2010	3,507		6.9%
2020	3,218		−8.2%
U.S. Decennial Census

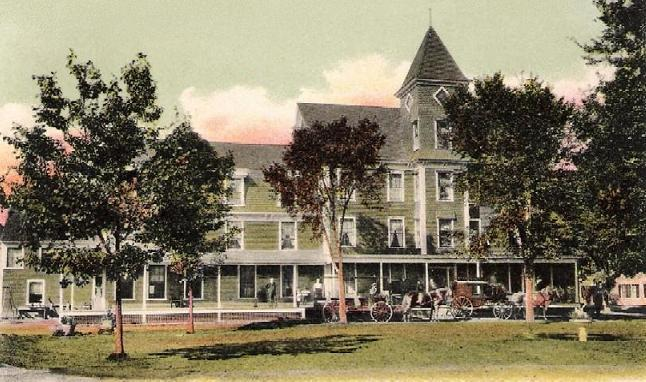
Mansion House in 1907

As of the census of 2010, there were 3,507 people, 1,399 households, and 880 families residing in the town. The population density was 70.4 inhabitants per square mile (27.2/km^{2}). There were 1,687 housing units at an average density of 33.9 units/sq mi (13.1 units/km^{2}). The racial makeup of the town was 96.8% White, 0.3% African American, 0.7% Native American, 0.6% Asian, 0.03% Native Hawaiian or Pacific Islander, 0.4% some other race, and 1.1% from two or more races. 1.7% of the population were Hispanic or Latino of any race.

There were 1,399 households, out of which 29.1% had children under the age of 18 living with them, 48.4% were headed by married couples living together, 10.4% had a female householder with no husband present, and 37.1% were non-families. 29.4% of all households were made up of individuals, and 13.1% were someone living alone who was 65 years of age or older. The average household size was 2.35, and the average family size was 2.85.

In the town, the population was spread out, with 21.9% under the age of 18, 7.3% from 18 to 24, 20.2% from 25 to 44, 31.2% from 45 to 64, and 19.4% who were 65 years of age or older. The median age was 45.4 years. For every 100 females, there were 91.8 males. For every 100 females age 18 and over, there were 86.6 males.

For the period 2007–2011, the estimated median annual income for a household in the town was $40,455, and the median income for a family was $53,542. Male full-time workers had a median income of $48,438 versus $30,000 for females. The per capita income for the town was $28,245. 13.0% of the population and 10.4% of families were below the poverty line, including 12.7% of people under the age of 18 and 19.2% age 65 or older.

== Transportation ==
Lancaster is at the intersection of U.S. Route 2 and U.S. Route 3 and is the northern terminus of New Hampshire Route 135, which leads to Dalton and points beyond. A seldom-used railroad track of the Maine Central Railroad skirts the Connecticut River, and a branch at Coos Junction leaves for Jefferson and Waumbek Junction. The Mount Washington Regional Airport is located 11 miles (18 km) away in adjacent Whitefield. As of January 2006, Lancaster is also served by the Tri-Town Bus, a public transportation route connecting with Whitefield and Littleton.

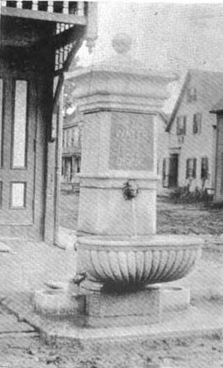
Benton Fountain in Lancaster, designed by Jacob Benton's wife, Louisa, in her husband's memory.

== Notable people ==
- GG Allin (1956–1993), punk singer
- Merle Allin (born 1955), punk bassist
- Jacob Benton (1814–1892), congressman
- Louisa Dow Benton (1831–1895), linguist
- Edward E. Cross (1832–1863), Civil War-era colonel
- Flora Adams Darling (1840–1910), writer and lineage society leader
- Irving W. Drew (1845–1922), U.S. senator
- William W. Field (1824–1907), Wisconsin legislator and farmer
- Benjamin F. Goss (1823–1893), Wisconsin legislator
- Edward D. Holton (1815–1892), Wisconsin legislator and businessman
- Margaret Hutchins (1884–1961), American librarian and professor
- Chester Bradley Jordan (1839–1914), 48th governor of New Hampshire
- Ossian Ray (1835–1892), congressman
- William C. Stokoe (1919–2000), linguist known for ASL research
- John W. Weeks (1860–1926), U.S. senator, 48th United States Secretary of War
- Sinclair Weeks (1893–1972), Secretary of Commerce during Eisenhower Administration
- Benjamin F. Whidden (1813–1896), first U.S. ambassador to Haiti
- Nathaniel White (1811–1880), businessman, social reformer, philanthropist, politician
- Jared W. Williams (1796–1864), U.S. senator, congressman; 21st governor of New Hampshire

== Sites of interest ==
- John Wingate Weeks Historic Site & Lodge (1913)
- Lancaster Historical Society Museum
- Wilder-Holton House (1780)
- Garland Mill (1856)
