= Newton Street School =

- Newton School
- U.S. National Register of Historic Places
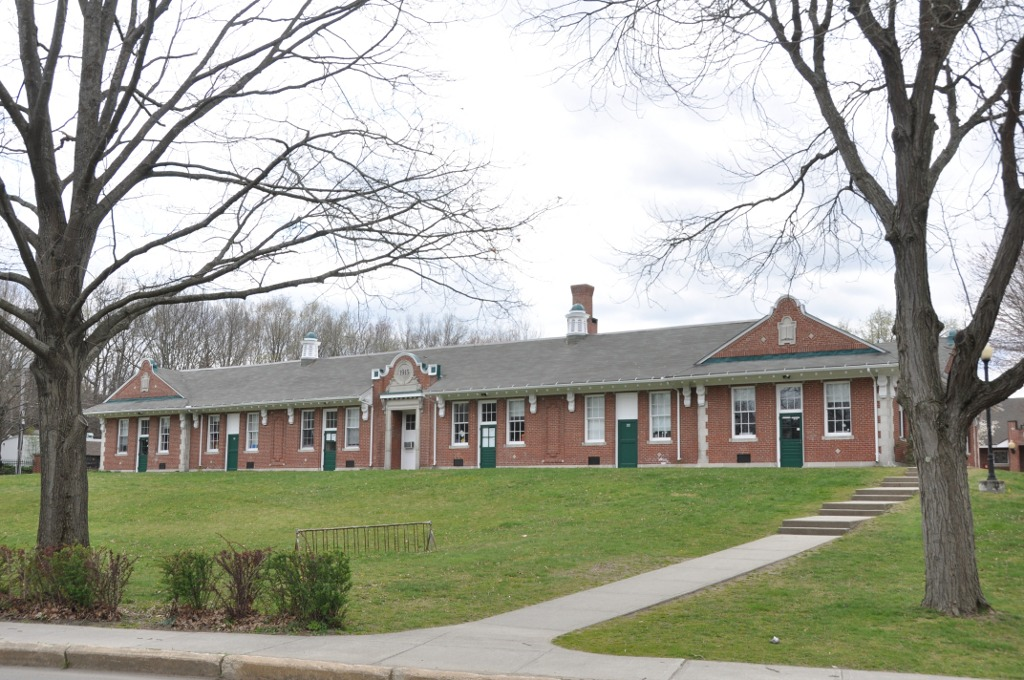

- Location within Massachusetts Location within the United States
- Location: 70 Shelburne Rd., Greenfield, Massachusetts
- Coordinates: 42°35′08″N 72°36′50″W
- Built: 1915
- Architect: William H. McLean
- Architectural style: Renaissance
- NRHP reference No.: 88001907
- Added to NRHP: October 27, 1988

The Newton School is a historic school at 70 Shelburne Road in Greenfield, Massachusetts. Built in 1915, it is one of the first graded elementary schools in western Massachusetts to feature a single-story plan and a large playground, presaging trends in those areas of school design. The school was listed on the National Register of Historic Places in 1988.

== Description and history ==
The Newton School is located west of downtown Greenfield, at the northwest corner of Shelburne Road and Massachusetts Route 2A. The U-shaped brick building features a shallow slate roof, and a brick gable over the main entrance. The corners of the building have stone insets decorated with an open book design.

The school was built in 1915, during Greenfield's greatest period of economic and population growth. It was designed by William H. McLean of Boston, an architect known for school designs. The school remained in active use until 1968, at which time it was closed and the building was leased to a community organization. It was reopened in 1988, as its surrounding residential areas had seen significant growth.

A 1915 annual town report refers to the school as Westside, a reference to the location on the west side of the Green River.

With the help of the Greenfield Recreation Department, Kaboom!, families and community members, Newton School built a new playground in October 2015 featuring playground instruments, unique to its community.

== See also ==
- National Register of Historic Places listings in Franklin County, Massachusetts
- Newton School Official website
