= Rockland Memorial Library =

- U.S. National Register of Historic Places
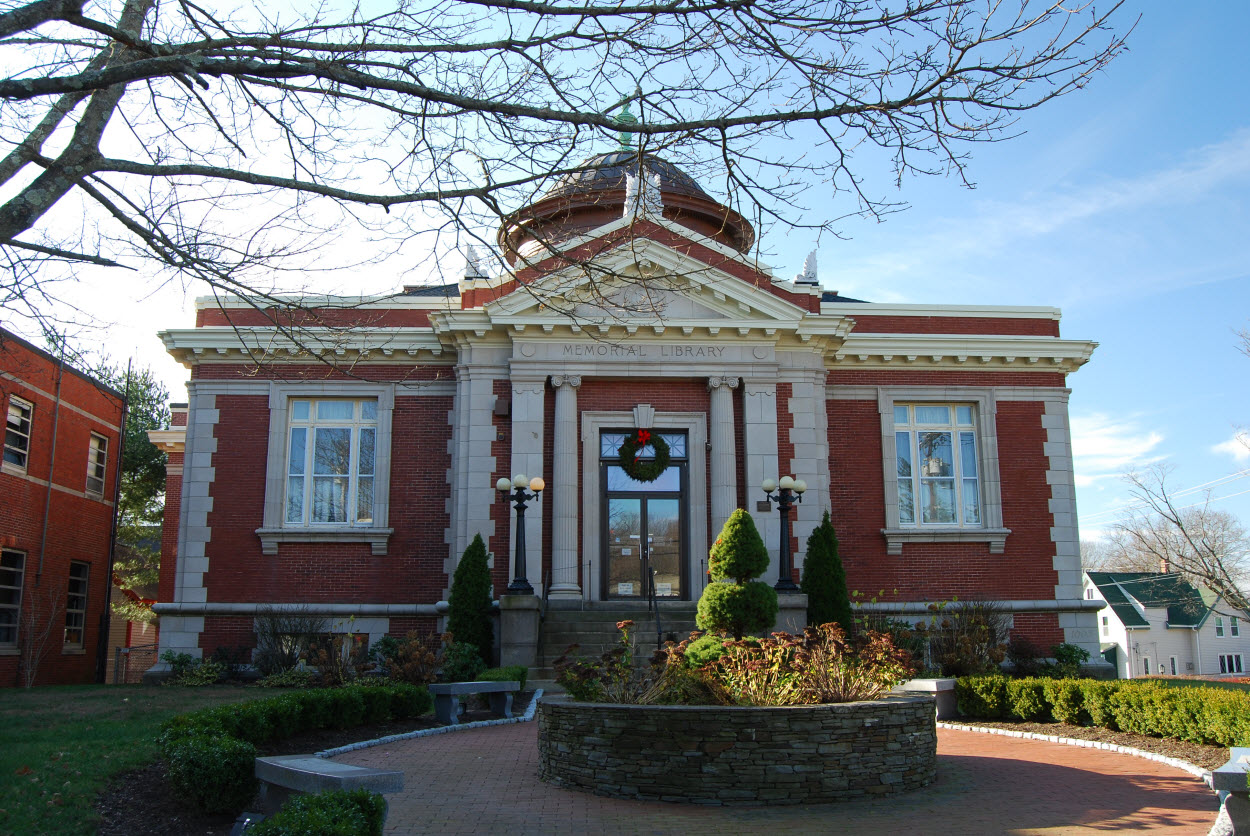

- Location within Massachusetts Location within the United States
- Location: Rockland, Massachusetts
- Coordinates: 42.1322°N 70.91672°W
- Built: 1903
- Architect: McLean & Wright
- Architectural style: Classical Revival
- NRHP reference No.: 89000221
- Added to NRHP: March 23, 1989

The Rockland Memorial Library is the public library of Rockland, Massachusetts. It is located at 382 Union Street, in a Carnegie-funded Classical Revival building, which was built in 1903 and is listed on the National Register of Historic Places. The library features several community oriented activities, such as raffles, book-release parties, and "Art in the Rotunda".

== Architecture and history ==
The Rockland Memorial Library is set in the center of Rockland, at the southwest corner of Union and Belmont Streets. It is a single-story masonry structure, with a foundation that is fully exposed at the rear of the sloping lot. Its walls are red brick laid in stretcher bond, with terra cotta trim. Trim elements include a water table separating the basement and first floor, corner quoining, pilasters that flank the entrance, and window surrounds. The building has a roughly cross-shaped plan, with narrow projecting sections to the front and rear center, and wider wings to either side that originally housed reading rooms. The front-facing projection houses the main entrance, which is slightly recessed, and flanked by Ionic columns and square pilasters, with a modillioned gable pediment above.

Rockland's first documented library was a private circulating collection established in 1833, when it was still part of Abington. This collection was taken over by the town (separated from Abington in 1874) in 1878, and was housed in a commercial building at Union and Church Streets that was destroyed by fire in 1890, taking part of the collection with it. Although funds were raised in the 1890s for a permanent home for the library, its construction was only made possible by a grant of $12,500 from Andrew Carnegie in 1902. The present building was completed in 1903 to a design by the Boston architectural firm McLean & Wright.

== See also ==
- List of Carnegie libraries in Massachusetts
- National Register of Historic Places listings in Plymouth County, Massachusetts
