= John G. Shedd =

American businessman

- Born: John Graves Shedd; July 20, 1850; Alstead, New Hampshire, US
- Died: October 22, 1926 (aged 76); Chicago, Illinois, US
- Burial place: Rosehill Cemetery
- Occupation: Businessman
- Spouse: Mary R. Porter (m. 1878)
- Relatives: Dick Wells (great-grandson)

John Graves Shedd (July 20, 1850 – October 22, 1926) was the second president, and chairman of the board, of Marshall Field & Company.

== Biography ==
Born on a New Hampshire farm on July 20, 1850, Shedd arrived in Chicago, Illinois, in 1871 and began working as a stock clerk for Marshall Field. By 1901, he had worked his way up to a vice-presidency and took over as president upon Field's death in 1906. Field himself described Shedd as "the greatest merchant in the United States," and, indeed, under Shedd's presidency Marshall Field & Company became the largest store in Chicago and the largest wholesale and dry goods company in the world.

Shedd was a civic leader and founding member of the Commercial Club of Chicago, which continues to play an active role in the city's efforts to maintain itself as a world-class metropolis. One of the Commercial Club's most notable undertakings was the sponsorship of Edward Bennett and Daniel Burnham's Plan of Chicago, which was released in 1909 and which to this day is considered to be one of the most important urban planning documents ever created.

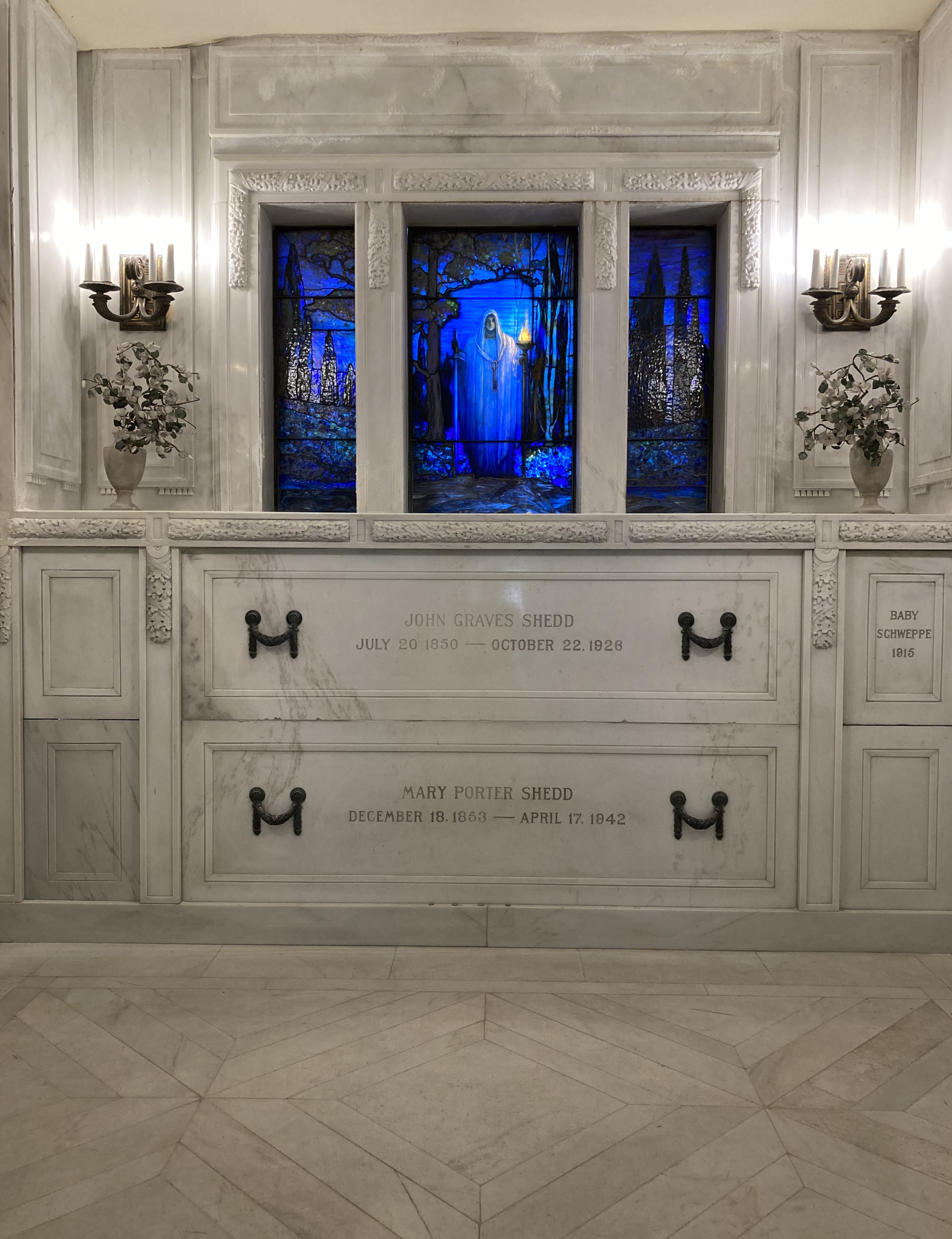
Shedd's grave at Rosehill Mausoleum

One of Chicago's major philanthropists, he contributed extensively to Chicago charities, universities and museums, and in the early 1920s he provided $3 million to build Chicago's Shedd Aquarium, as a complement to The Field Museum (founded in 1893 as a part of the World's Columbian Exposition and renamed in honor of Marshall Field in 1905) and The Art Institute of Chicago (whose current building was also a product of the 1893 World's Columbian Exposition). Completed in 1930, the Shedd Aquarium remained the world's largest aquarium for most of the century.

In 1920, Shedd provided the funds for the construction of the Shedd-Porter Memorial Library in Alstead, New Hampshire.

He died of appendicitis in Chicago on October 22, 1926. He was interred at Rosehill Mauseoleum in Rosehill Cemetery.

== Legacy ==
In 2002, The John G. Shedd Institute for the Arts, a community-based performing arts center and music school in Eugene, Oregon, was co-founded by one of his great-grandchildren.

With his wife, Mary Roanna (née Porter), they had daughters Helen Shedd Reed Keith and Laura Abbie Shedd Schweppe (? – 1937). Laura married Charles Hodgdon Schweppe (1881–1941) in 1913. His grandson John Shedd Reed was president of the Atchison, Topeka and Santa Fe Railway from 1967 to 1986 as well as president of the Shedd Aquarium from 1984 to 1994.
