= Carver Memorial Library =

- U.S. National Register of Historic Places
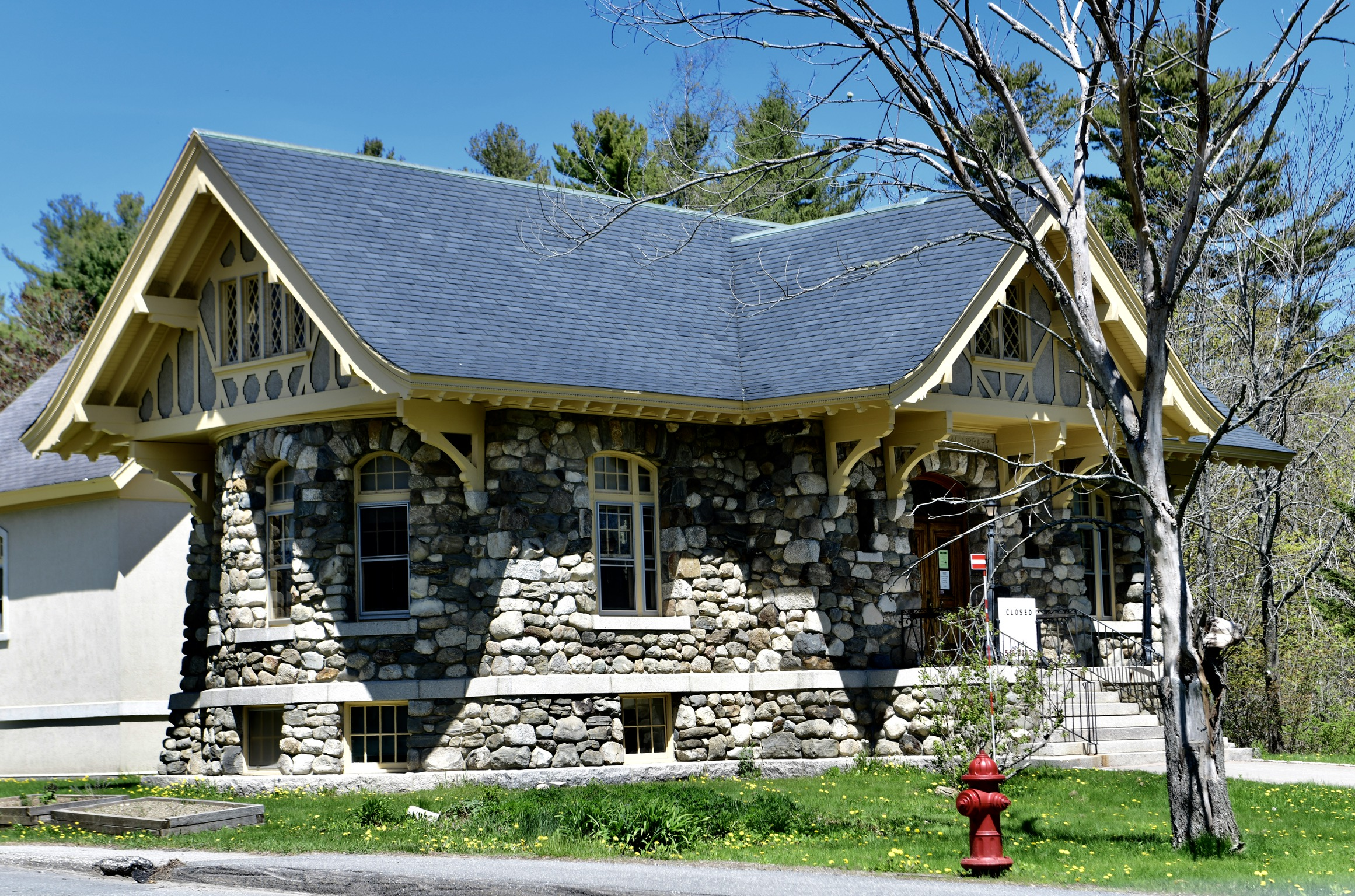

- Location within Maine Location within the United States
- Location: 12 Union St., Searsport, Maine
- Coordinates: 44°27′38″N 68°55′23″W
- Area: less than one acre
- Built: 1910
- Built by: H. C. Brown
- Architect: McLean & Wright
- Architectural style: Classical Revival, Tudor Revival
- MPS: Maine Public Libraries MPS
- NRHP reference No.: 93001113
- Added to NRHP: October 14, 1993

Carver Memorial Library is the public library of Searsport, Maine. It is located at 12 Union Street in the town center, in a 1910 Tudor Revival building donated in memory of Captain George A. Carver, a Searsport native. The building was listed on the National Register of Historic Places in 1993.

== Architecture and history ==
Carver Memorial Library is set at the northeast corner of Union and Mortland Streets in the village center of Searsport, about one block east of the town offices, and one block north of United States Route 1. It is a single story fieldstone structure, three bays wide, with a gabled roof and a projecting central gabled pavilion. The gable ends are decorated in Tudor style half-timbering. The main entrance is set at the center of the projection in a segmented-arch opening, with large Craftsman-style brackets supporting the half-timbered gable above. The interior has retained most of its original finishes, including marble floors, oak shelving and desks, and black marble fireplaces in the reading areas.

The public library in Searsport was founded in 1871, with its collection started with donations from David Sears and a private lending library that had previously existed in the town. By 1900 its collection had exceeded 2,000 volumes. This building, designed by the firm of McLean & Wright, was built in 1910. It was a gift to the town by Mrs. George Carver and her son Amos, in honor of her husband, a Searsport native, shipbuilder and ship's captain.

== See also ==
- National Register of Historic Places listings in Waldo County, Maine
