= William H. McLean =

American architect

William Herbert McLean
- Born: 1871; Newton, Massachusetts
- Died: January 10, 1943 (aged 71–72); Middleborough, Massachusetts
- Occupation: Architect
- Practice: McLean & Wright; W. H. & Henry McLean; William H. McLean

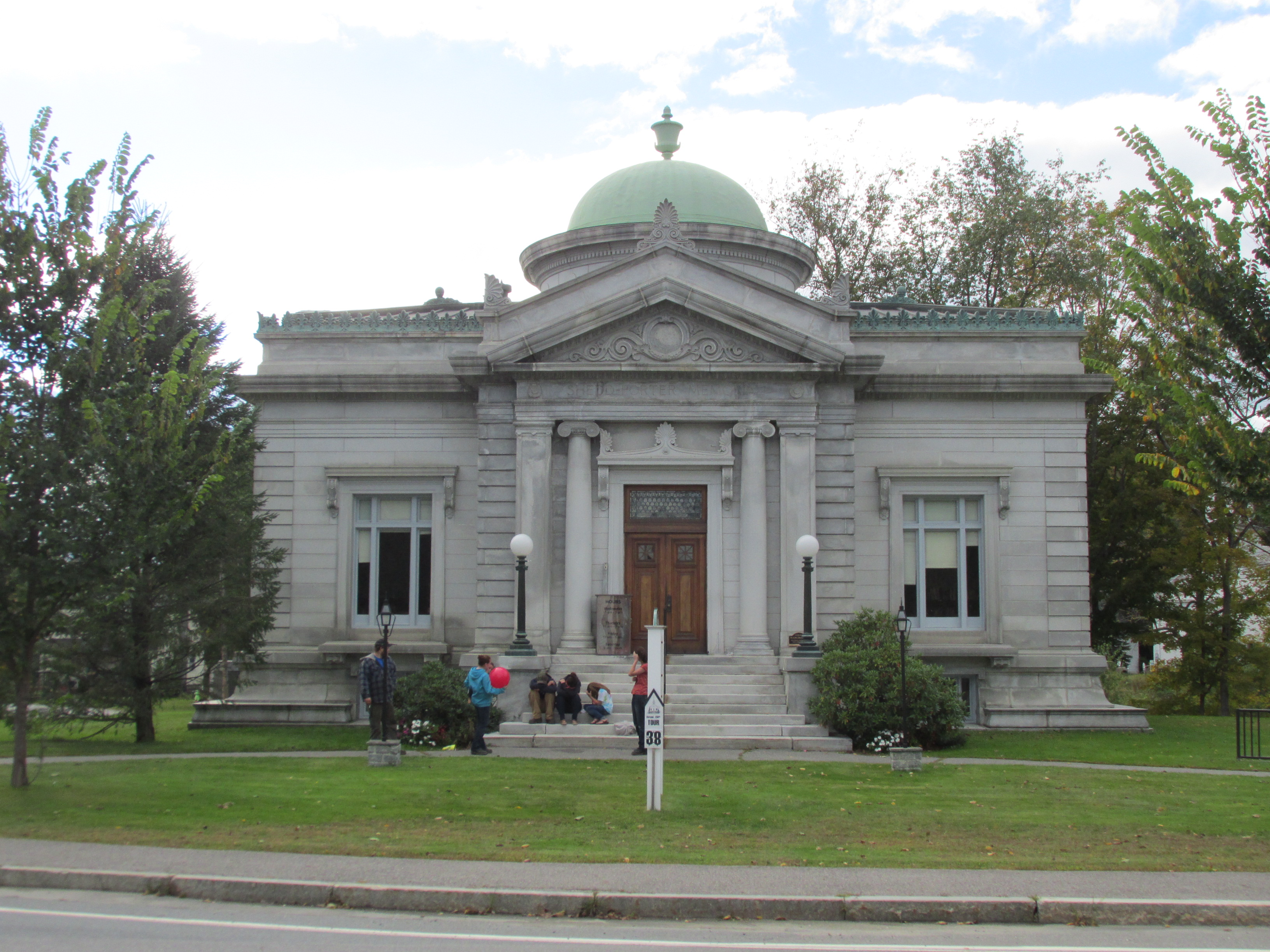
Shedd-Porter Memorial Library, Alstead, New Hampshire, 1909–10.

William H. McLean (1871 – January 10, 1943) was an American architect from Boston, Massachusetts. He is best known for the design of public libraries, many of which he designed as a member of the firm of McLean & Wright.

== Life and career ==
William Herbert McLean was born in Newton, Massachusetts, in 1871 to Henry and Elizabeth McLean, who had immigrated from Nova Scotia that year. His father was a carpenter and built a number of houses in the Newton area. McLean attended the Massachusetts Normal Art School, the present Massachusetts College of Art and Design, graduating in 1888. He was also a member of the Boston Architectural Club.

McLean worked for the Providence and Boston firm of Gould, Angell & Swift and contributed to the design of the Richards Memorial Library, completed in 1894, in North Attleborough, Massachusetts. After Gould, Angell & Swift was dissolved in 1897, McLean worked for the firm of Winslow & Wetherell. By 1899 McLean was practicing on his own account. In 1901 he formed a partnership with Albert Hoffman Wright (1871–1919), known as McLean & Wright. McLean and Wright worked in partnership until 1912.

McLean's father had begun to practice as an architect in Newton beginning in the 1890s, and for ten years before 1912 worked in the McLean & Wright office. After McLean and Wright dissolved their partnership, McLean and his father formed a new partnership, known as W. H. & Henry McLean. Henry McLean retired in 1917, and William H. continued to practice alone. He retired in 1938.

== Personal life ==
McLean married in 1907 to Fannie F. Ingram of Malden, Massachusetts. They lived in Cambridge. She died in 1935. After McLean retired in 1938 he moved to Middleborough, Massachusetts, where he lived with his daughter and her husband.

McLean died January 10, 1943, in Middleborough at the age of 72.

== Legacy ==
Many of the works of McLean and his associates were designed in an elaborate Beaux Arts style, though neither he nor them had much formal training.

McLean was an early adopter of the one-story plan for school buildings. Prior to the early twentieth century only very small schools were one-story. However, at this time the one-story plan was adopted as a safer, more economical option for schools outside of heavily urbanized areas. His Newton Street School in Greenfield was the first school of this type in Western Massachusetts, and generated controversy over costs and aesthetics at the time. Despite these controversies, this building type was supported by well-known school architects including Frank Irving Cooper and Dwight Heald Perkins on the grounds of economy and safety.

Many buildings designed by McLean and his associates have been listed on the United States National Register of Historic Places, and others contribute to listed historic districts. Additionally, the McLean & Wright-designed Calgary library has been designated a National Historic Site of Canada.

McLean, in partnership with Albert H. Wright and Henry McLean, was codesigner of thirteen Carnegie libraries, in Connecticut, Massachusetts, New Hampshire and Vermont.

== Selected works ==
=== Libraries ===
- Rockland Memorial Library, (Note: Building funded by Andrew Carnegie.) Rockland, Massachusetts (1903, NRHP 1989)
- Rockport Public Library (former), Rockport, Massachusetts (1904–07)
- Carnegie Public Library, Turners Falls, Massachusetts (1905)
- Wilton Public and Gregg Free Library, Wilton, New Hampshire (1905–07, NRHP 1982)
- Attleboro Public Library, Attleboro, Massachusetts (1906–07)
- Brainerd Memorial Library, Haddam, Connecticut (1906–08)
- Fair Haven Free Library, Fair Haven, Vermont (1906)
- Ramsdell Public Library, Housatonic, Massachusetts (1906–08, NRHP 2014)
- William D. Weeks Memorial Library, Lancaster, New Hampshire (1906–08, NRHP 2000)
- Franklin Public Library, Franklin, New Hampshire (1907)
- Griswold Memorial Library, (Note: A contributing property to the Colrain Center Historic District, listed on the National Register of Historic Places in 2006.) Colrain, Massachusetts (1908)
- Hungerford Memorial Library, (Note: A contributing property to the Litchfield–South Roads Historic District.) Harwinton, Connecticut (1908–10)
- Rockingham Free Public Library, Bellows Falls, Vermont (1908)
- West Haven Public Library, West Haven, Connecticut (1908)
- West Somerville Branch Library, Somerville, Massachusetts (1908–09, NRHP 1989)
- Lebanon Public Library, Lebanon, New Hampshire (1909)
- Shedd-Porter Memorial Library, Alstead, New Hampshire (1909–10, NRHP 2010)
- Stephenson Memorial Library, Greenfield, New Hampshire (1909)
- Adams Public Library, Central Falls, Rhode Island (1910)
- Beals Memorial Library, Winchendon, Massachusetts (1910–11)
- Calgary Public Library (former), Calgary, Alberta (1910–12, NHSC 2018)
- Carver Memorial Library, Searsport, Maine (1910, NRHP 1993)
- South Norwalk Public Library, Norwalk, Connecticut (1911–13)
- Witherle Memorial Library, Castine, Maine (1911–13)
- Baker Free Library, Bow, New Hampshire (1912–14)
- Enfield Public Library (former), Thompsonville, Connecticut (1912–14)
- Abbie Greenleaf Library, Franconia, New Hampshire (1912, NRHP 2003)
- Arms Library, Shelburne Falls, Massachusetts (1913–14)
- Millbury Public Library, Millbury, Massachusetts (1915)
- Athol Public Library, Athol, Massachusetts (1917–18)

=== Schools ===
- Tourtellotte Memorial High School, North Grosvenordale, Connecticut (1907)
- Newton Street School, Greenfield, Massachusetts (1915, NRHP 1988)
- Harvey Wheeler School (former), Concord, Massachusetts (1917–19)
- Bourne Grammar School (former), (Note: Presently the Jonathan Bourne Public Library.) Bourne, Massachusetts (1925)
- Middleborough Memorial High School (former), (Note: A contributing property to the Middleborough Center Historic District, listed on the National Register of Historic Places in 2000.) Middleborough, Massachusetts (1926)
- Peoples Academy, Morrisville, Vermont (1927–28, NRHP 1996)
- Bellows Free Academy, St. Albans, Vermont (1930)
- Provincetown High School (former), Provincetown, Massachusetts (1931)

=== Other buildings ===
- Larcom Theatre, Beverly, Massachusetts (1912)
- Vermont Building, Eastern States Exposition, West Springfield, Massachusetts (1929)
- New Hampshire Building, Eastern States Exposition, West Springfield, Massachusetts (1930)

== Gallery of architectural works ==
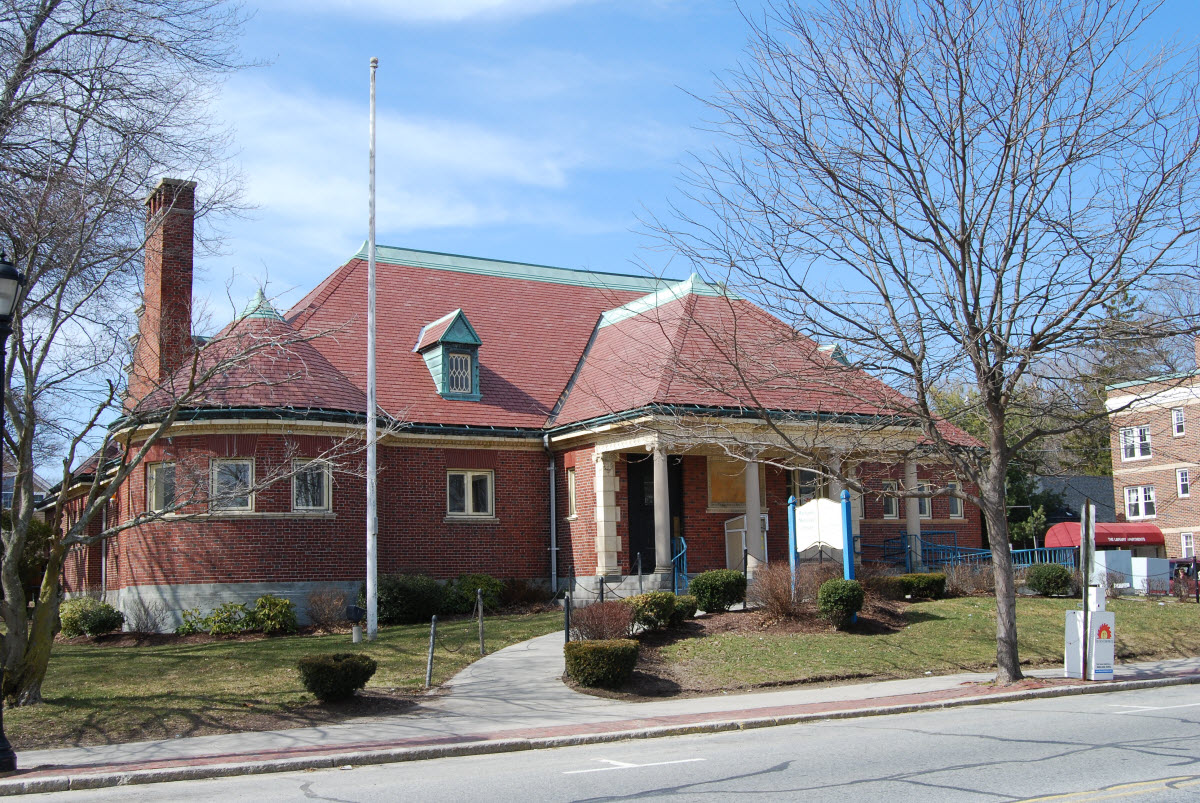
Richards Memorial Library, North Attleborough, Massachusetts, 1894.

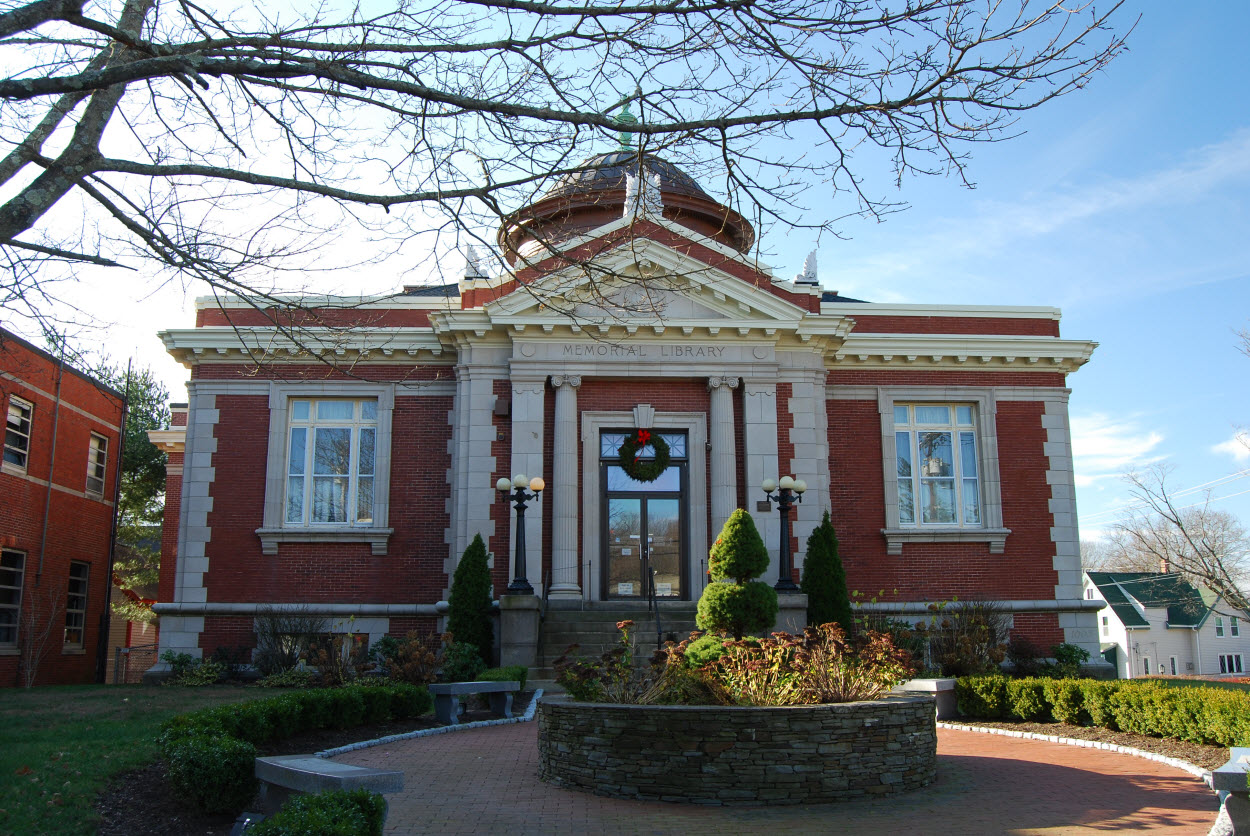
Rockland Memorial Library, Rockland, Massachusetts, 1903.

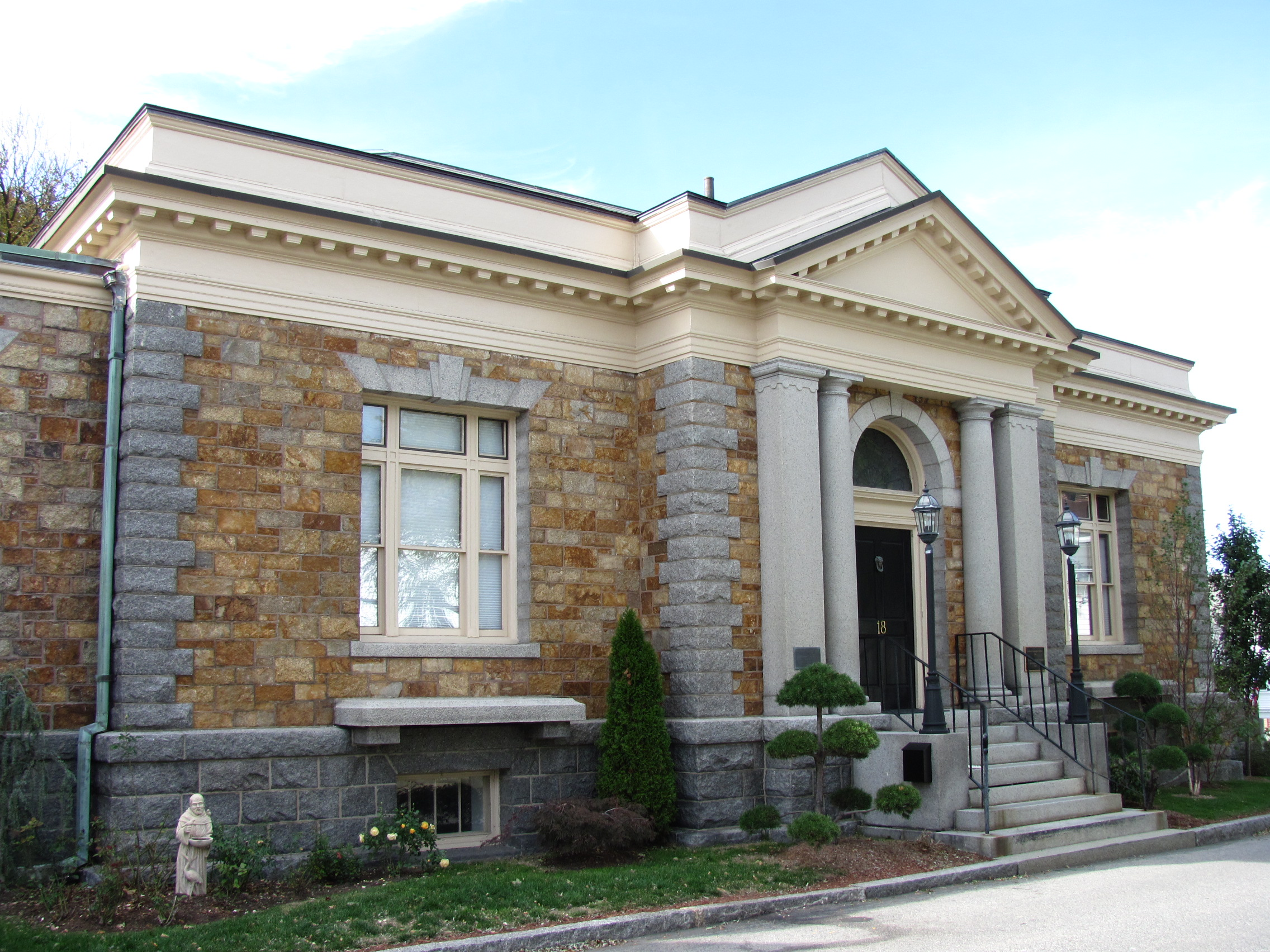
Rockport Public Library, Rockport, Massachusetts, 1904–07.

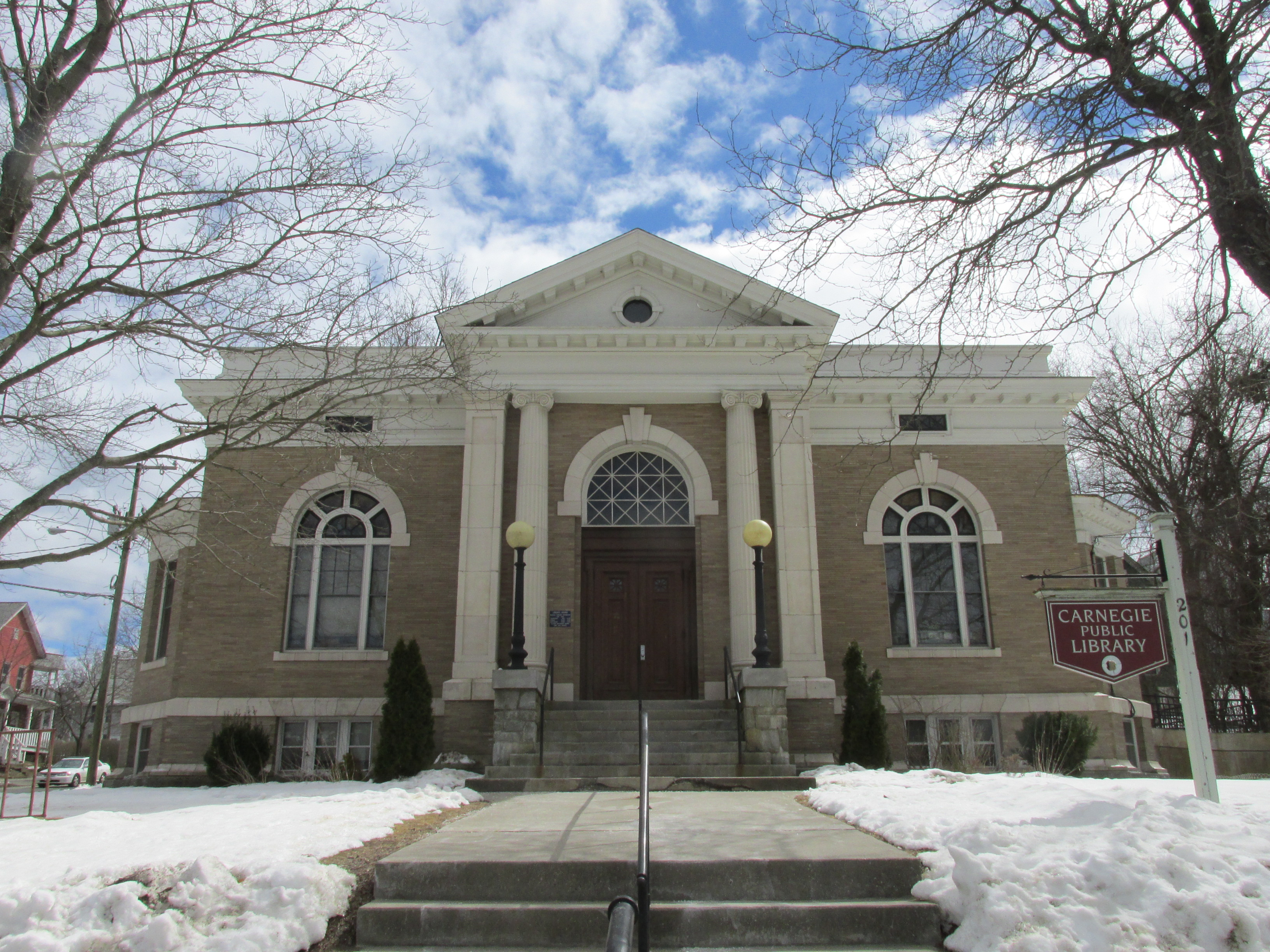
Carnegie Public Library, Turners Falls, Massachusetts, 1905.

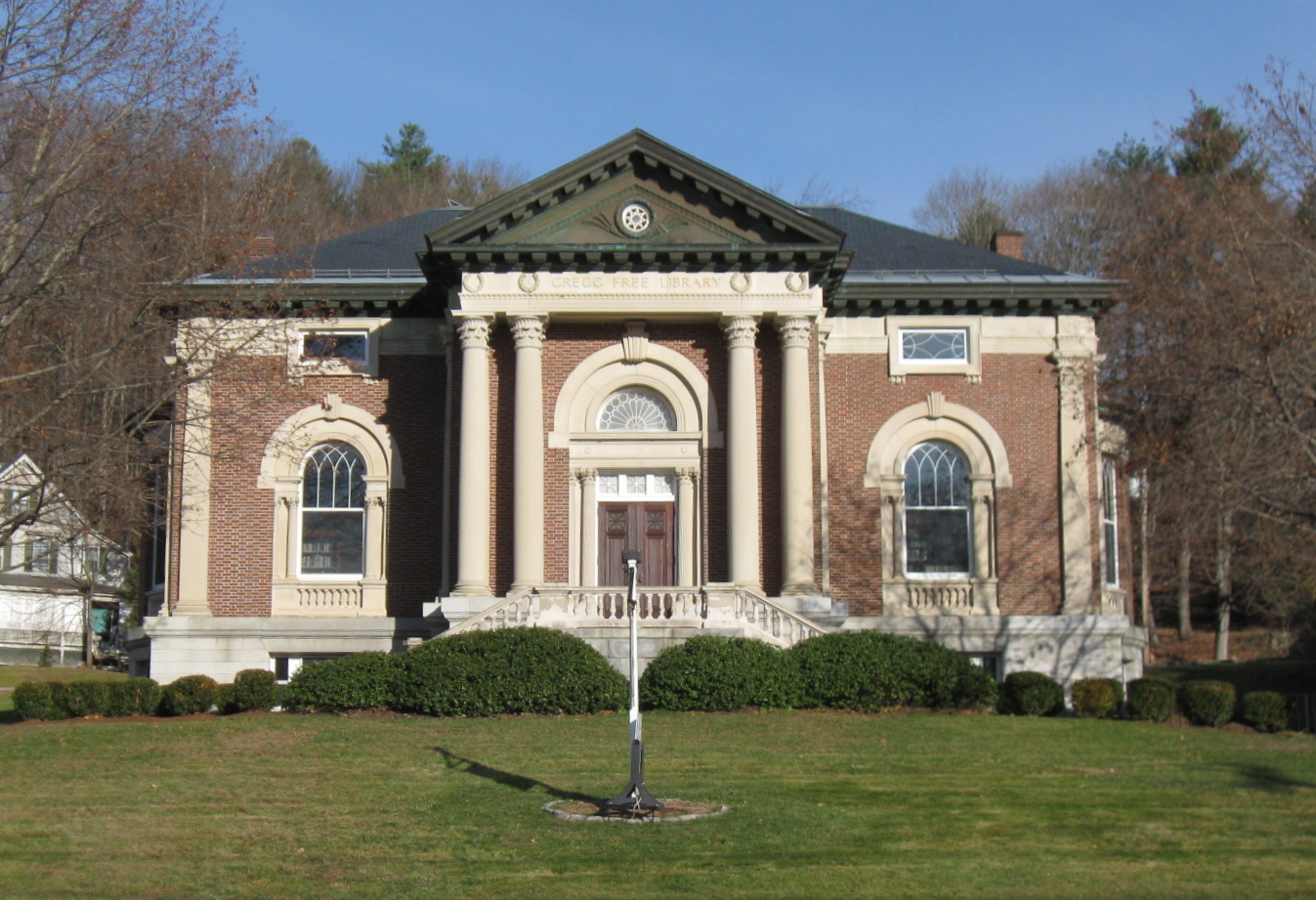
Wilton Public and Gregg Free Library, Wilton, New Hampshire, 1905–07.

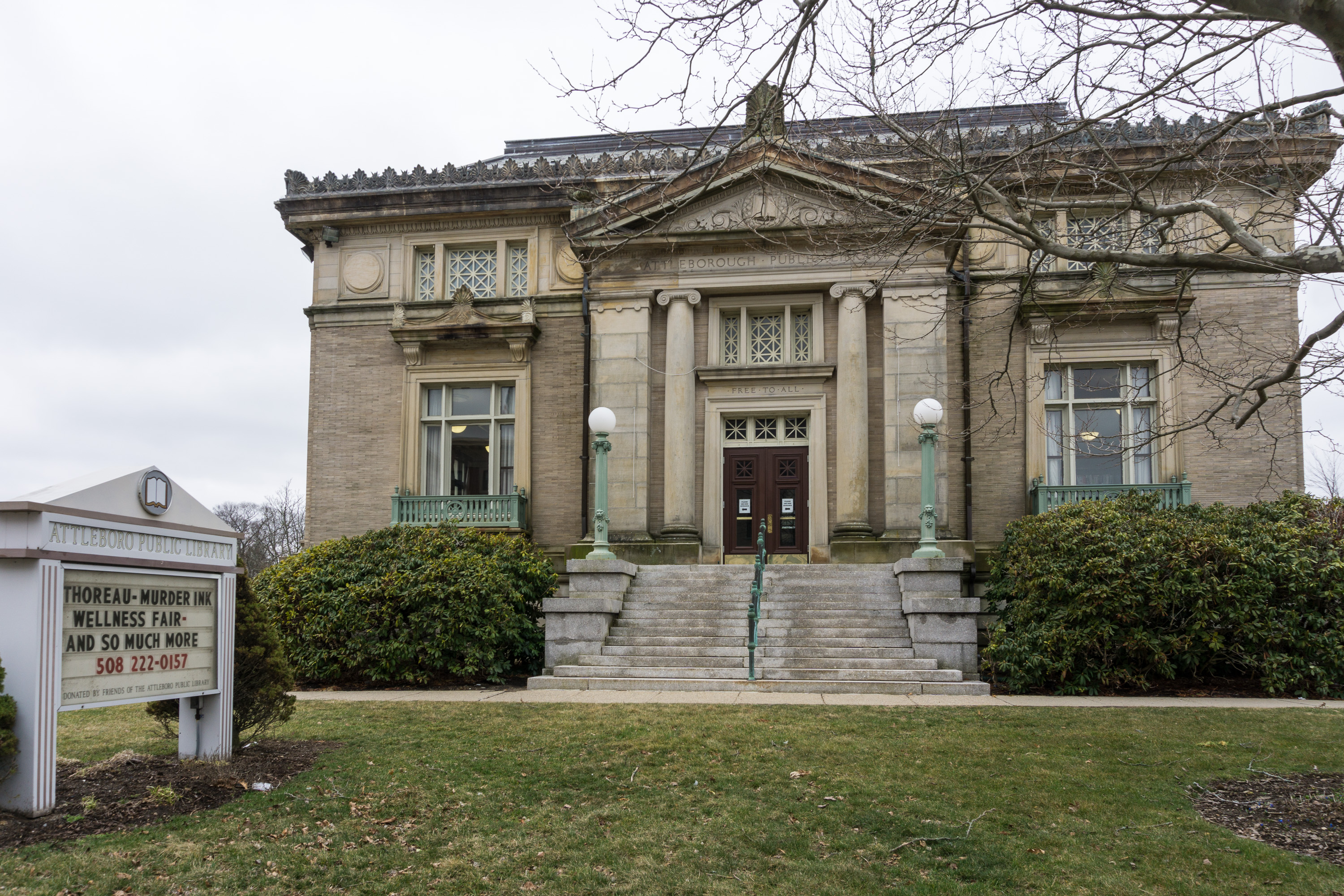
Attleboro Public Library, Attleboro, Massachusetts, 1906–07.

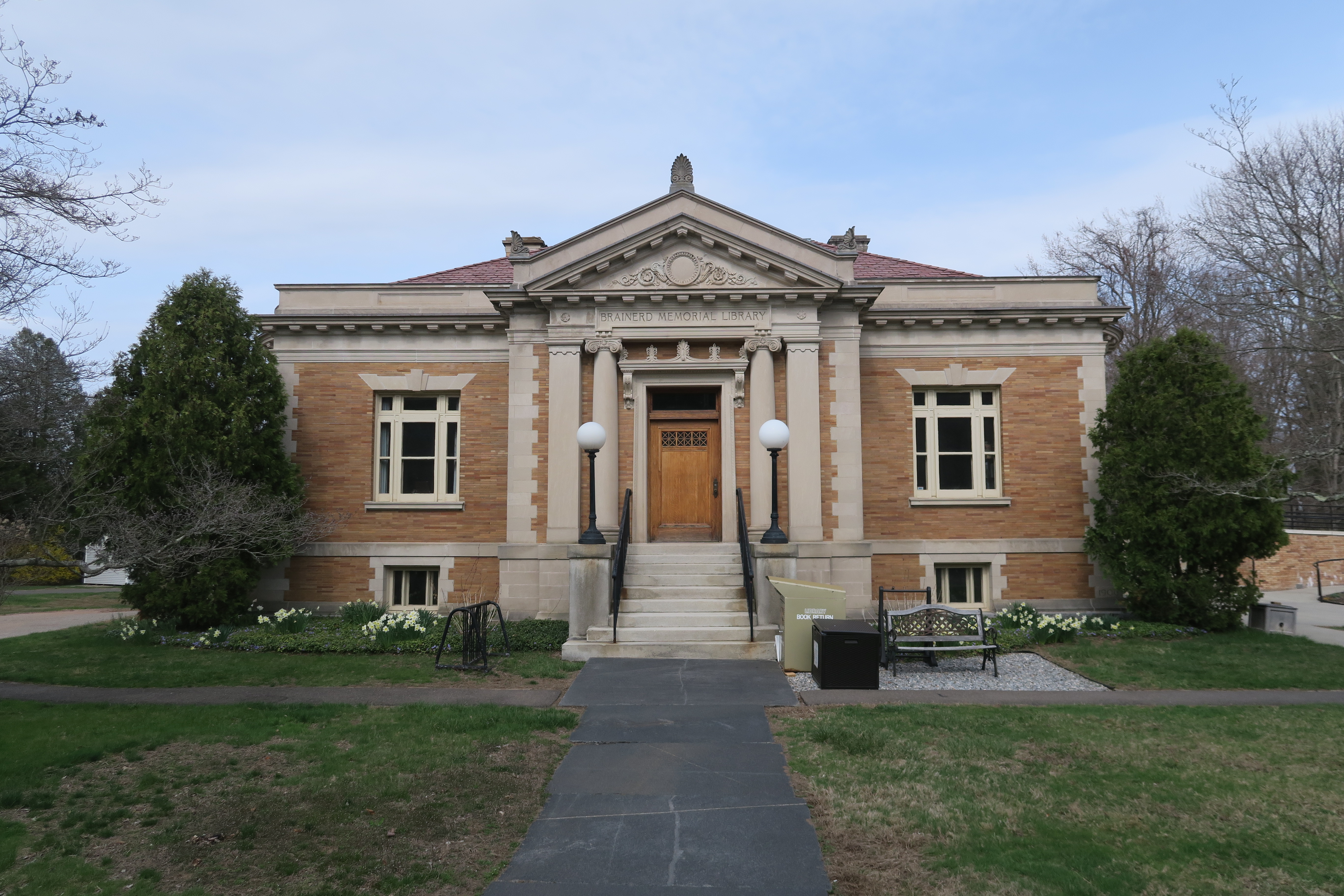
Brainerd Memorial Library, Haddam, Connecticut, 1906–08.

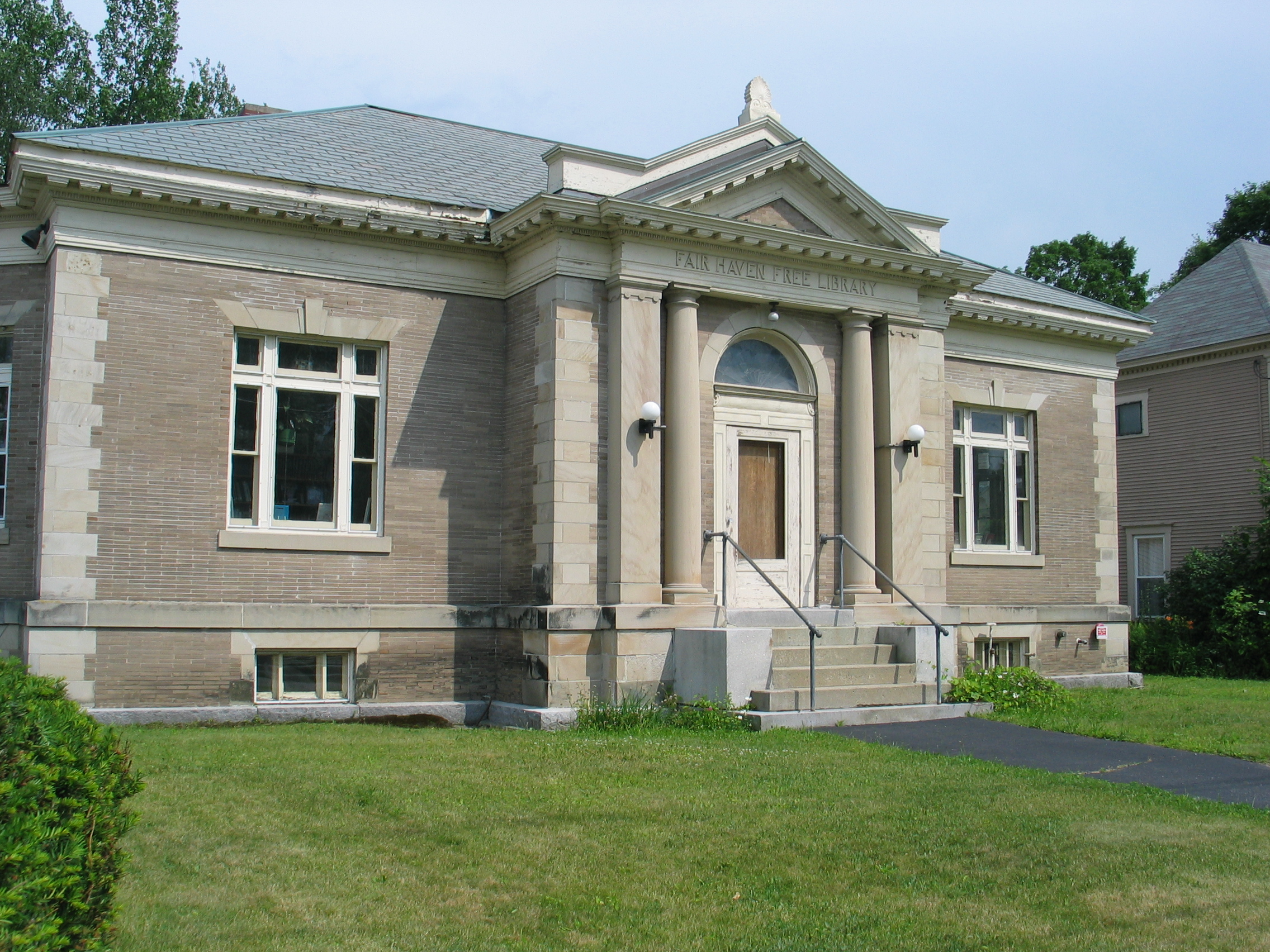
Fair Haven Free Library, Fair Haven, Vermont, 1906.

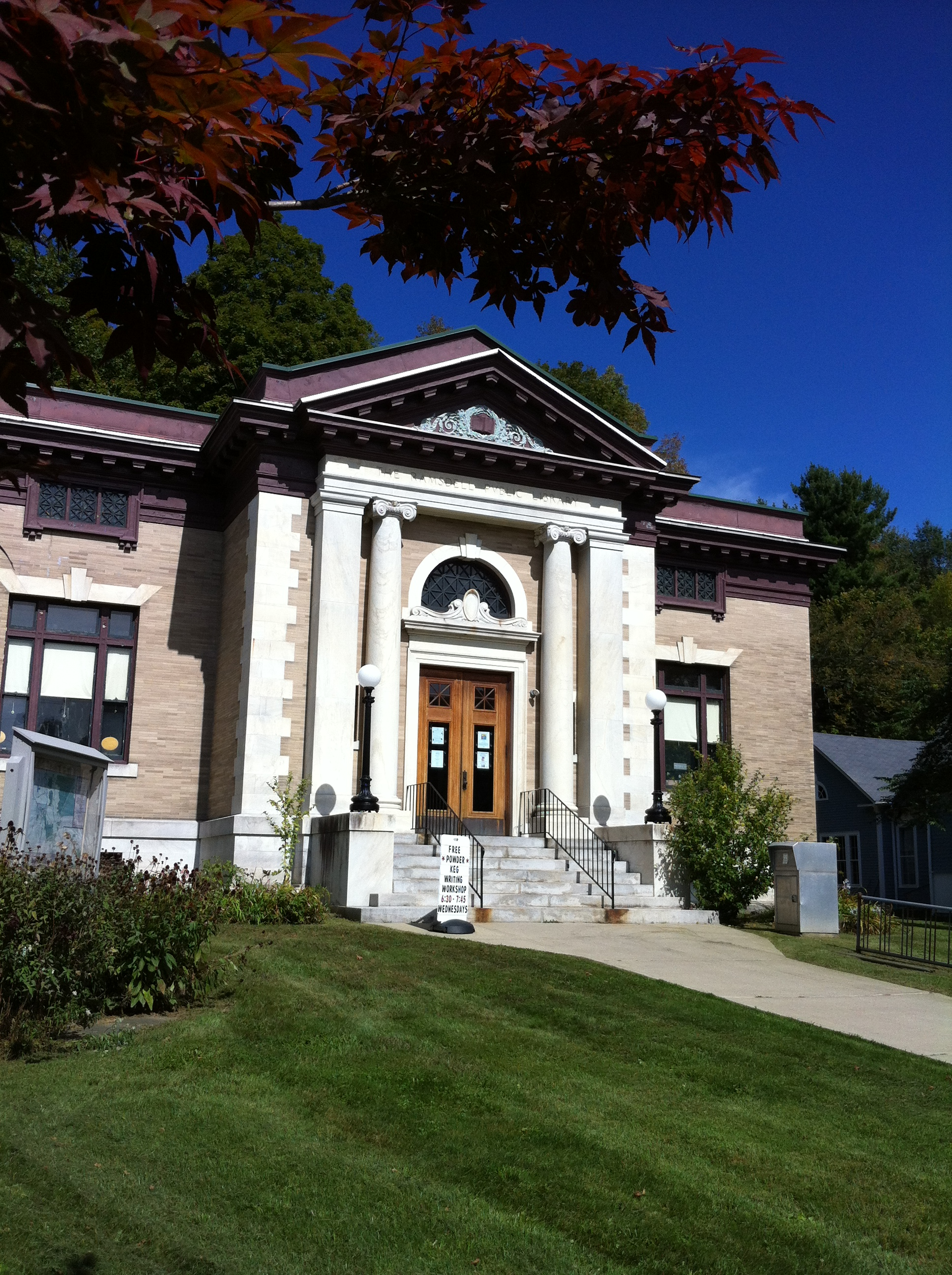
Ramsdell Public Library, Housatonic, Massachusetts, 1906–08.

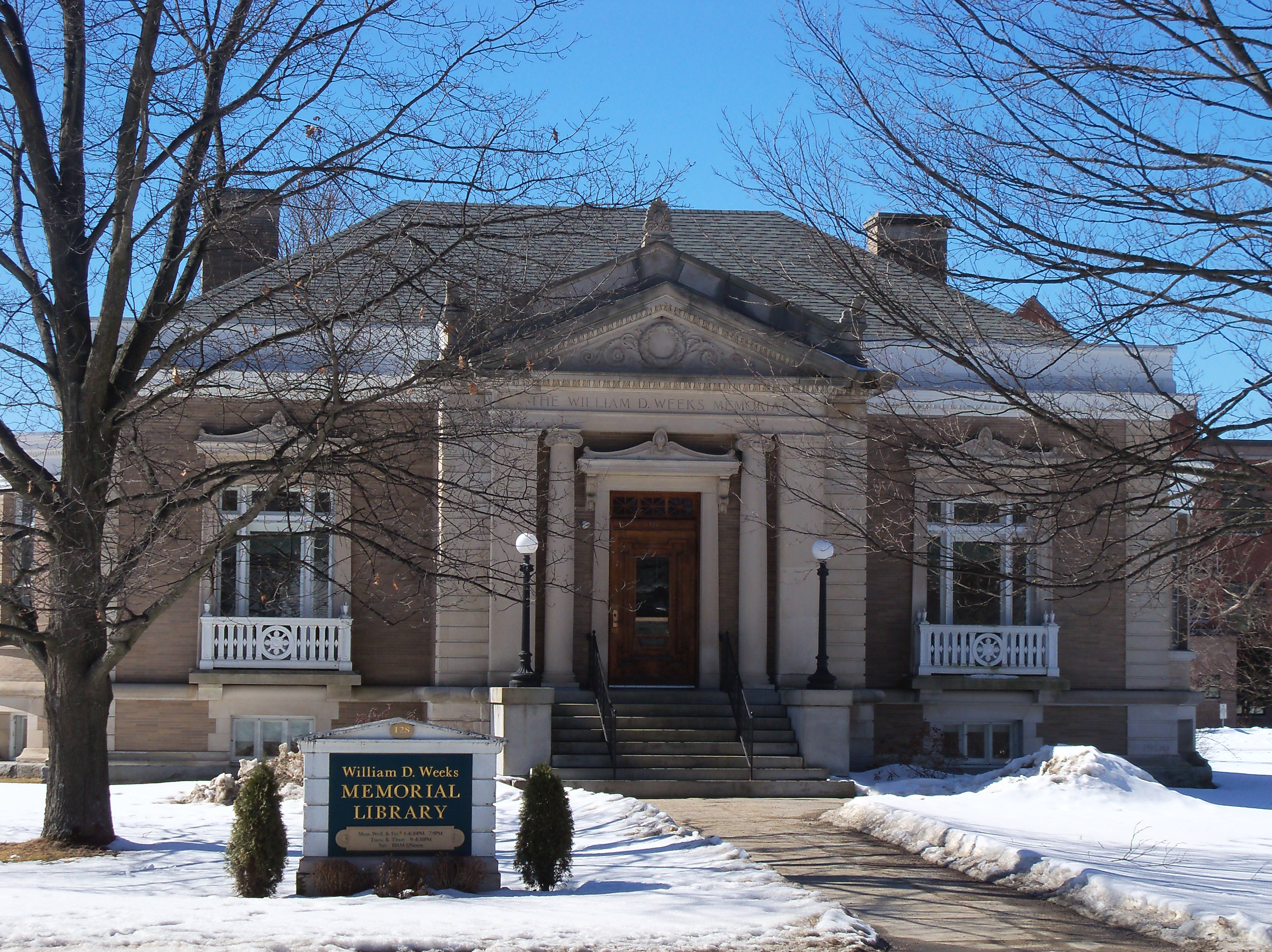
William D. Weeks Memorial Library, Lancaster, New Hampshire, 1906–08.

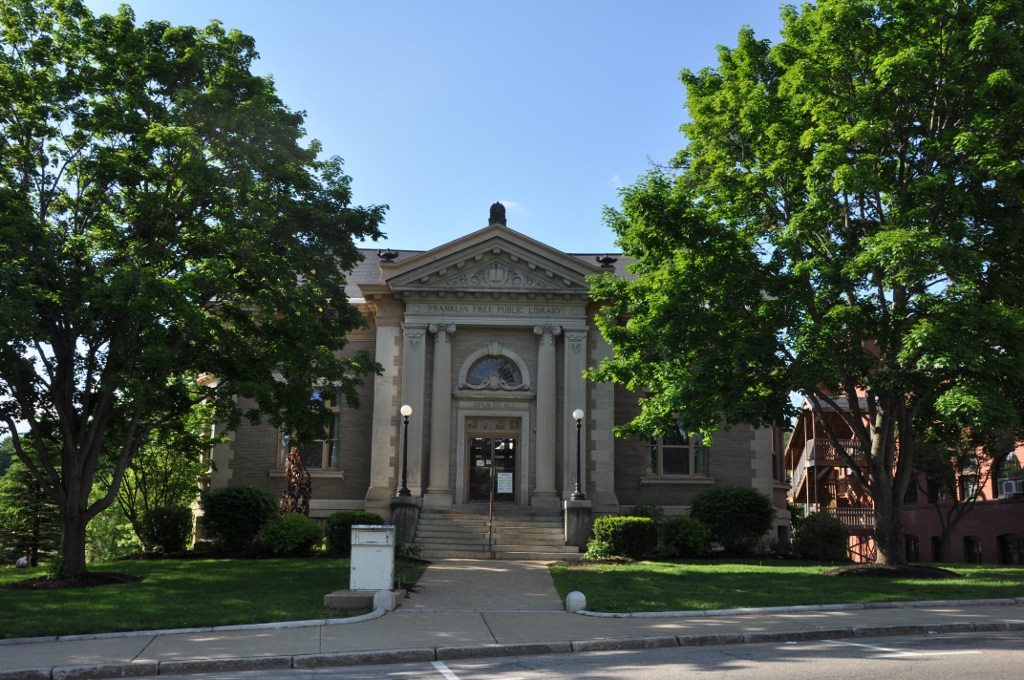
Franklin Public Library, Franklin, New Hampshire, 1907.

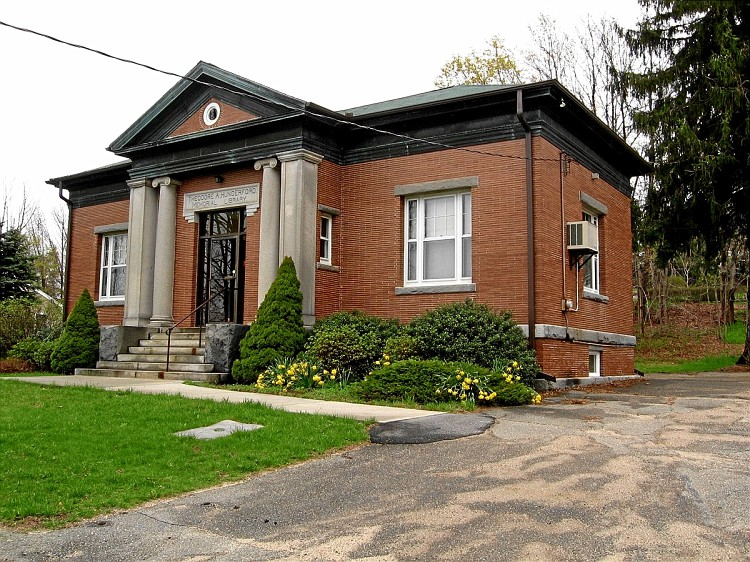
Hungerford Memorial Library, Harwinton, Connecticut, 1908.

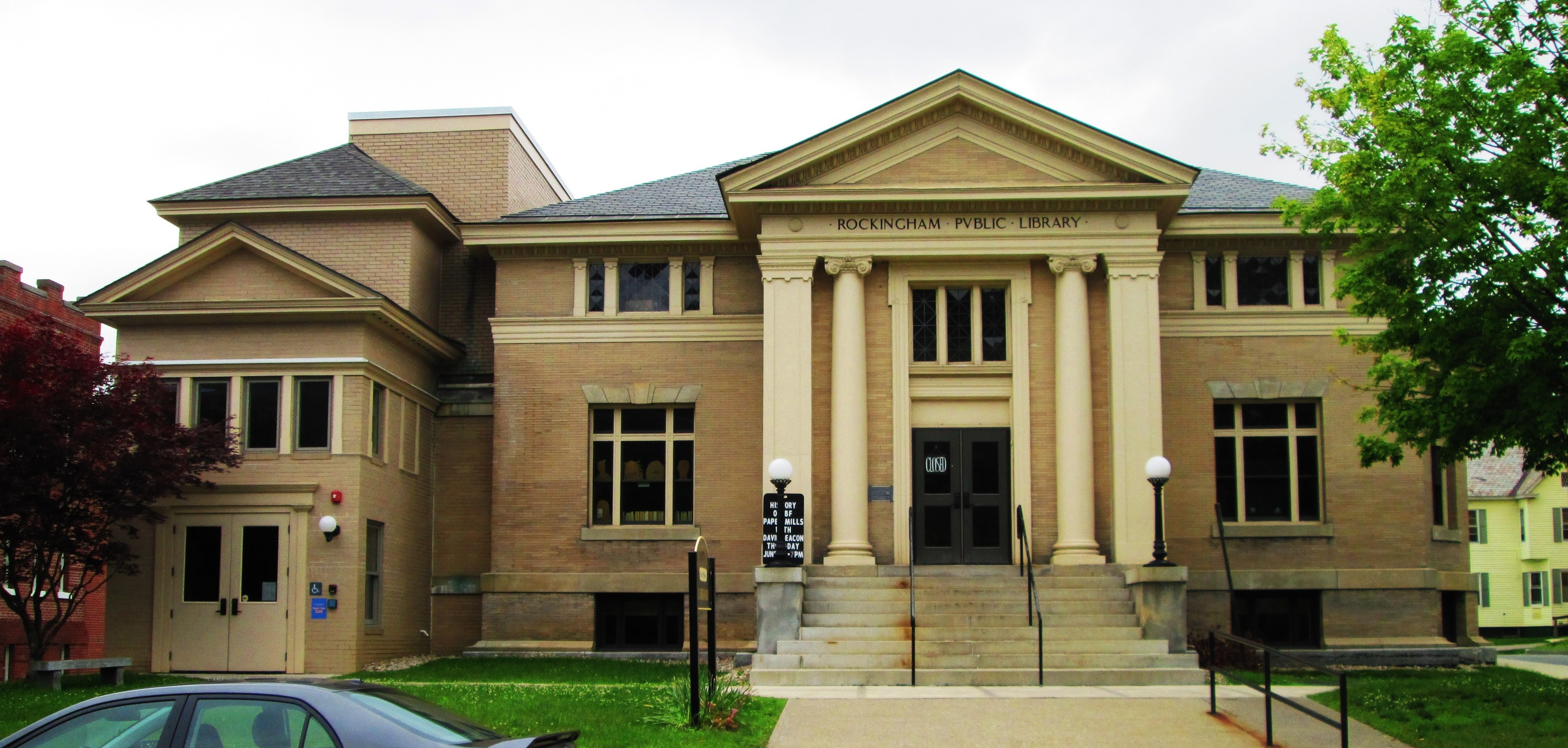
Rockingham Free Public Library, Bellows Falls, Vermont, 1908.

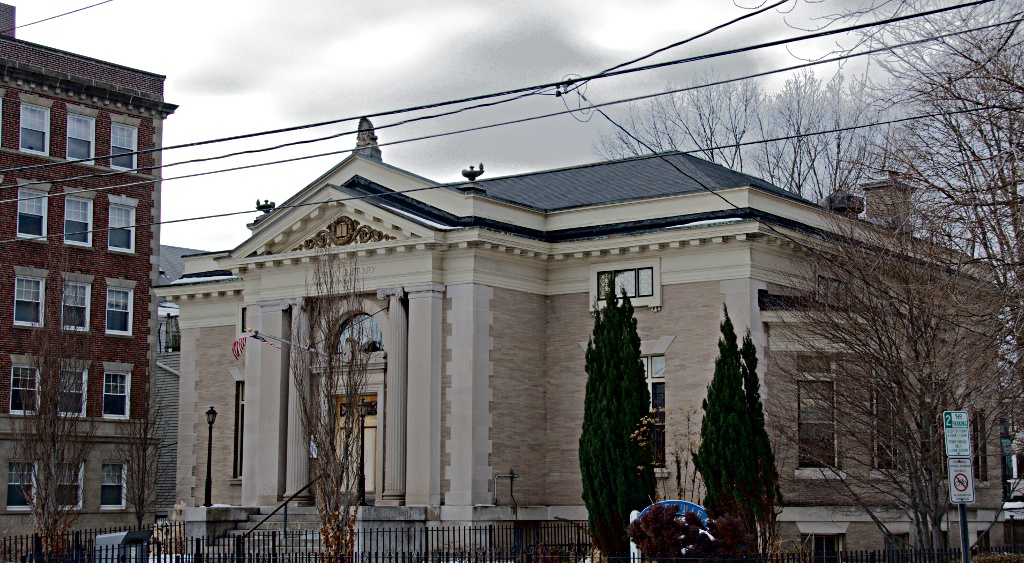
West Somerville Branch Library, Somerville, Massachusetts, 1908–09.

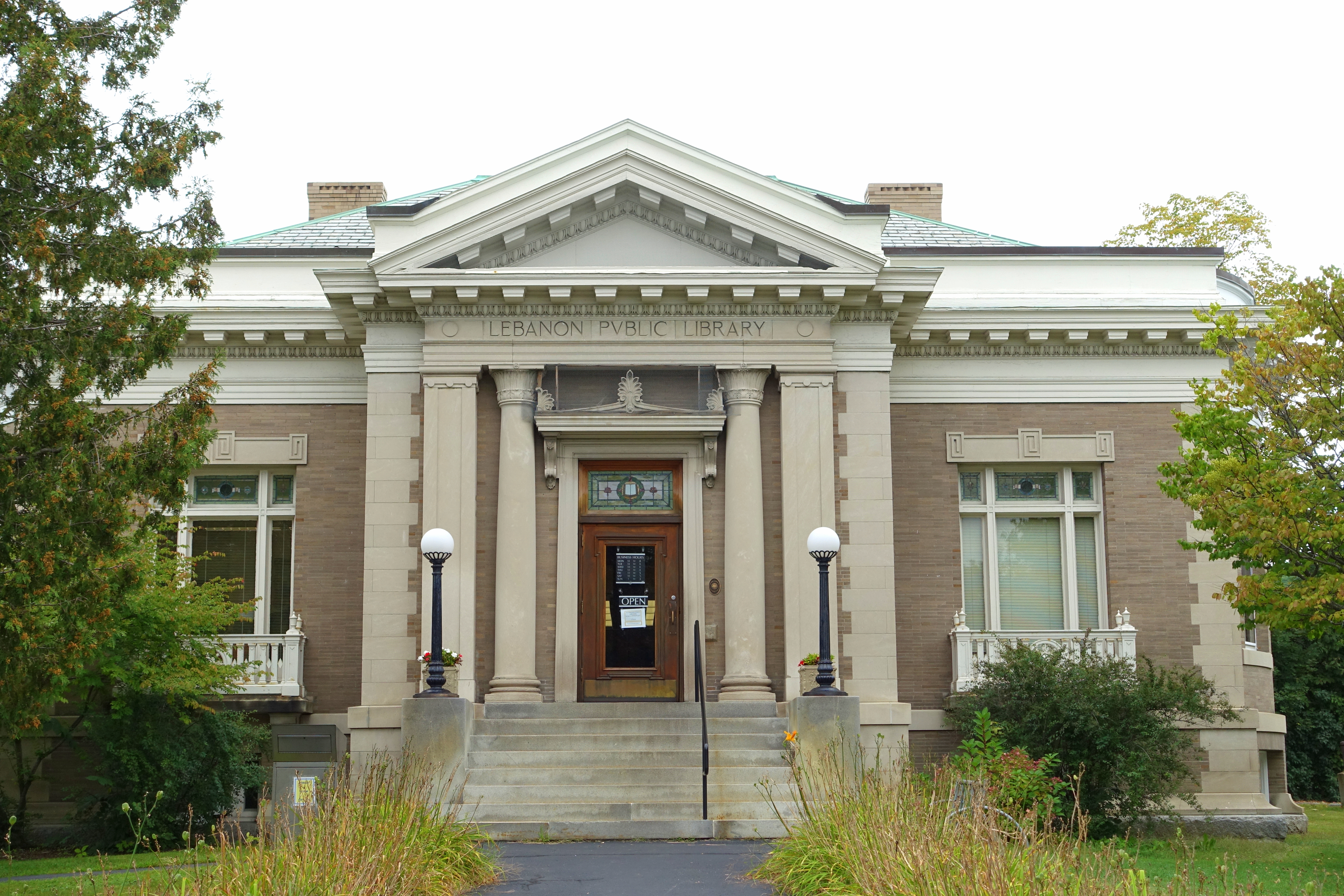
Lebanon Public Library, Lebanon, New Hampshire, 1909.

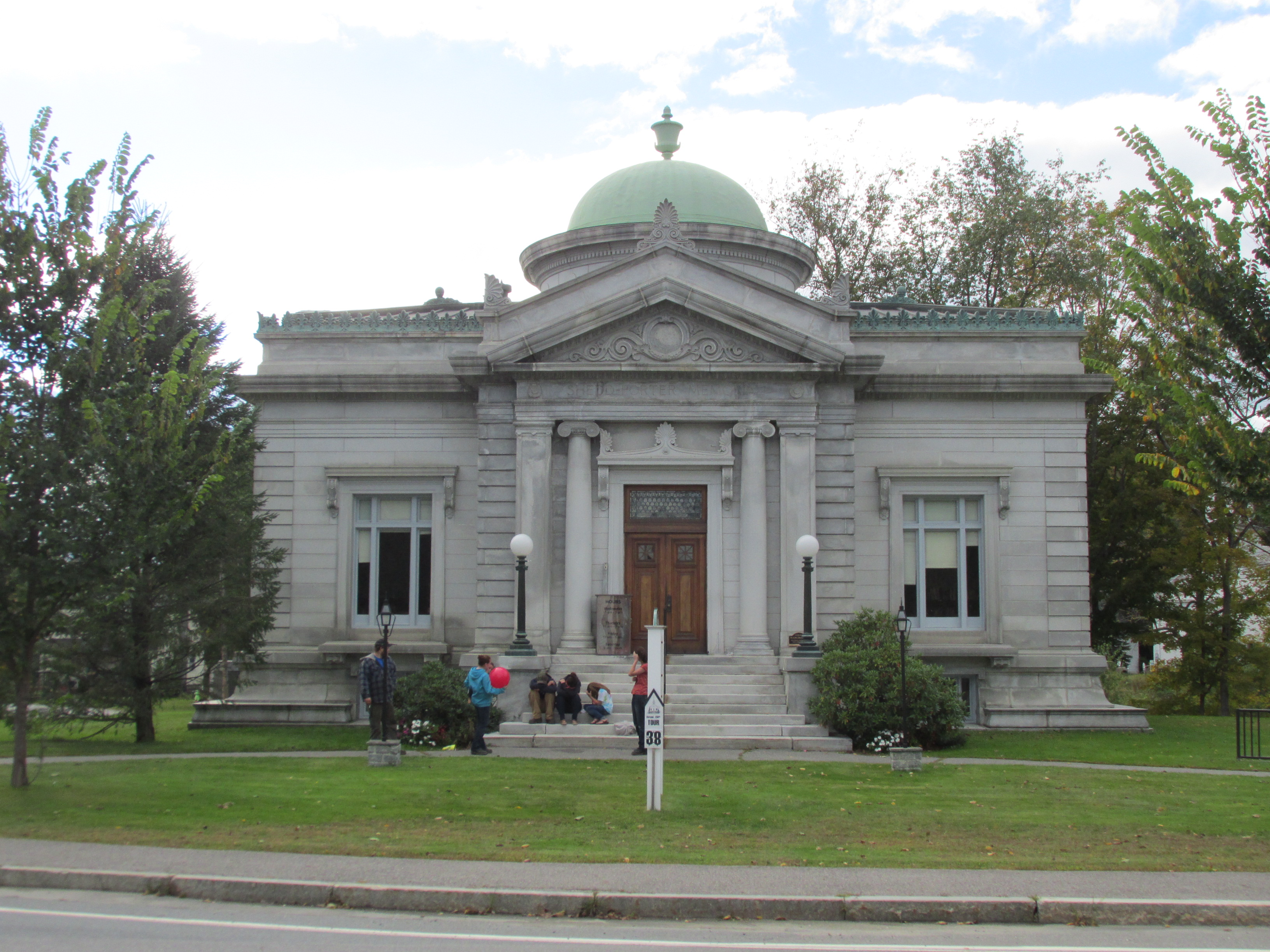
Shedd-Porter Memorial Library, Alstead, New Hampshire, 1909–10.

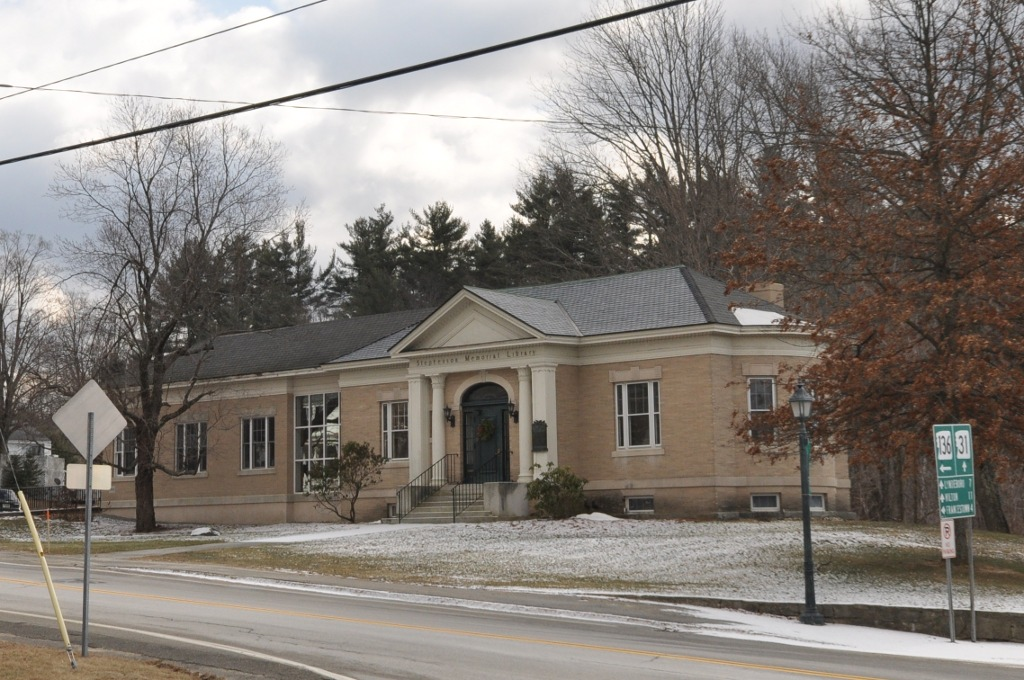
Stephenson Memorial Library, Greenfield, New Hampshire, 1909.

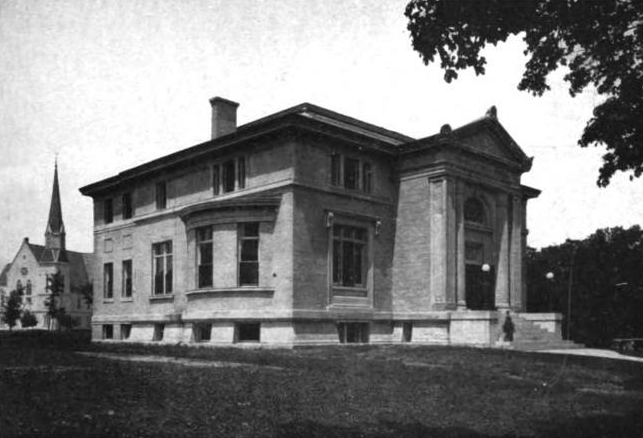
Beals Memorial Library, Winchendon, Massachusetts, 1910–11.

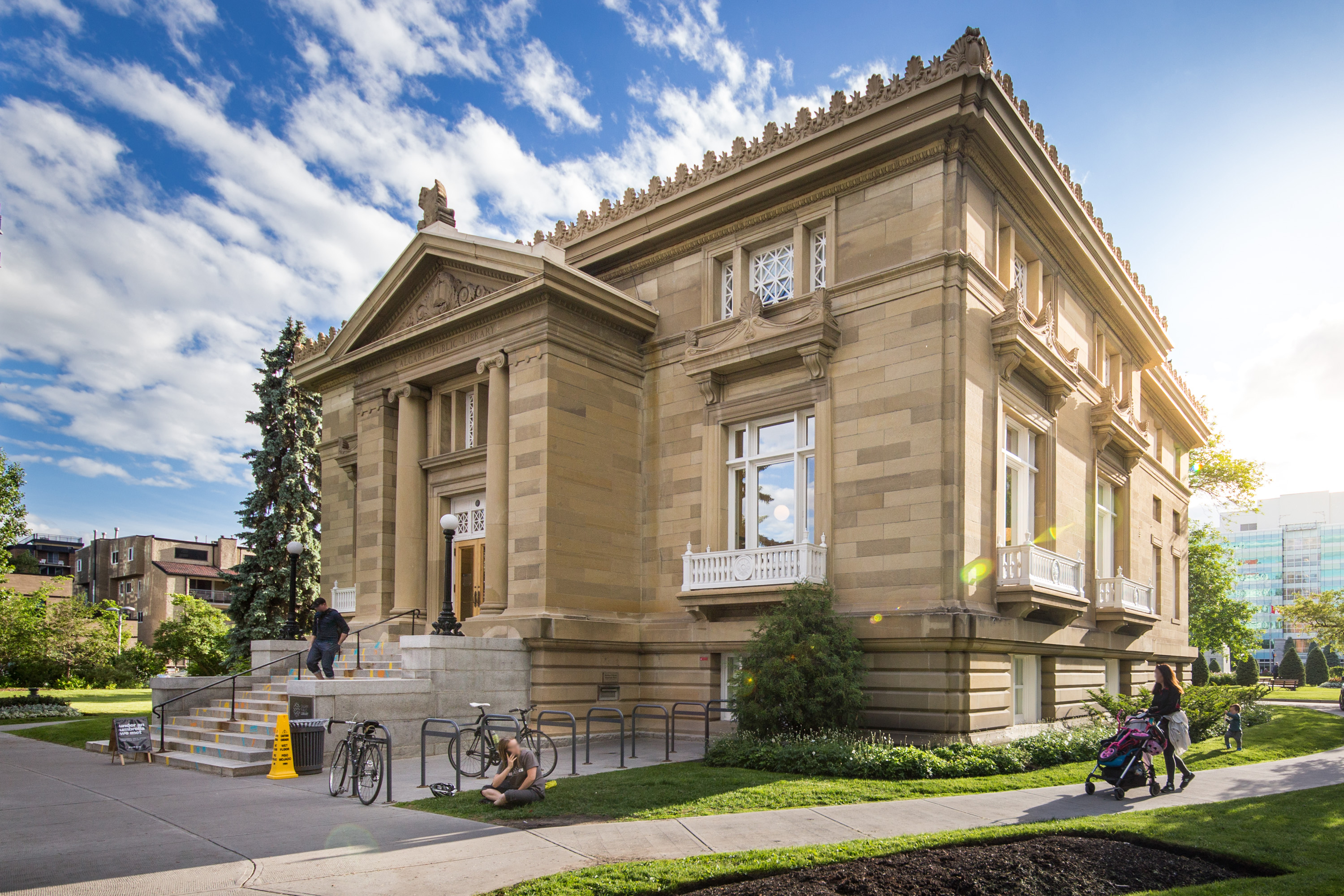
Calgary Public Library, Calgary, Alberta, 1910–12.

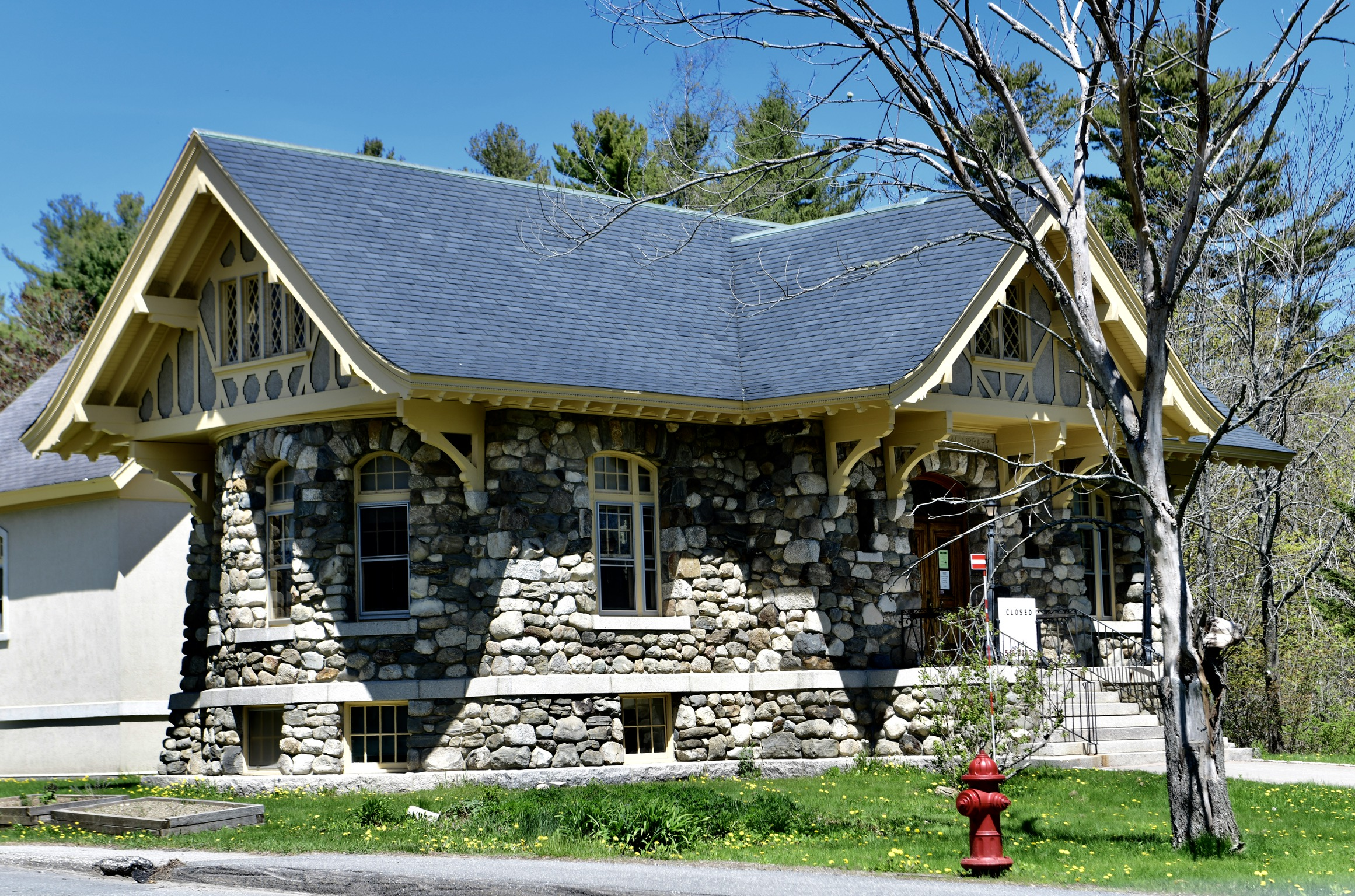
Carver Memorial Library, Searsport, Maine, 1910.

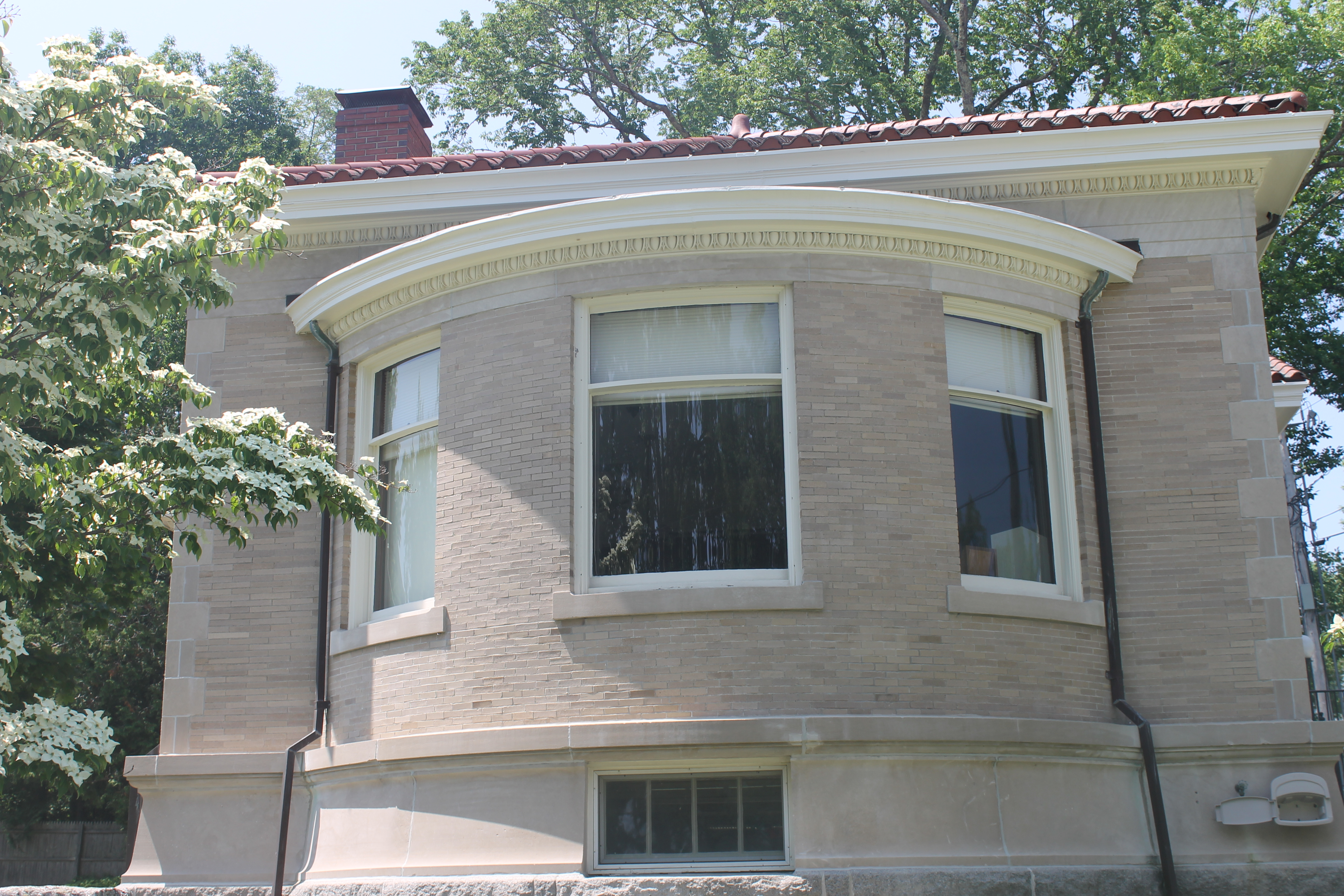
Witherle Memorial Library, Castine, Maine, 1911–13.

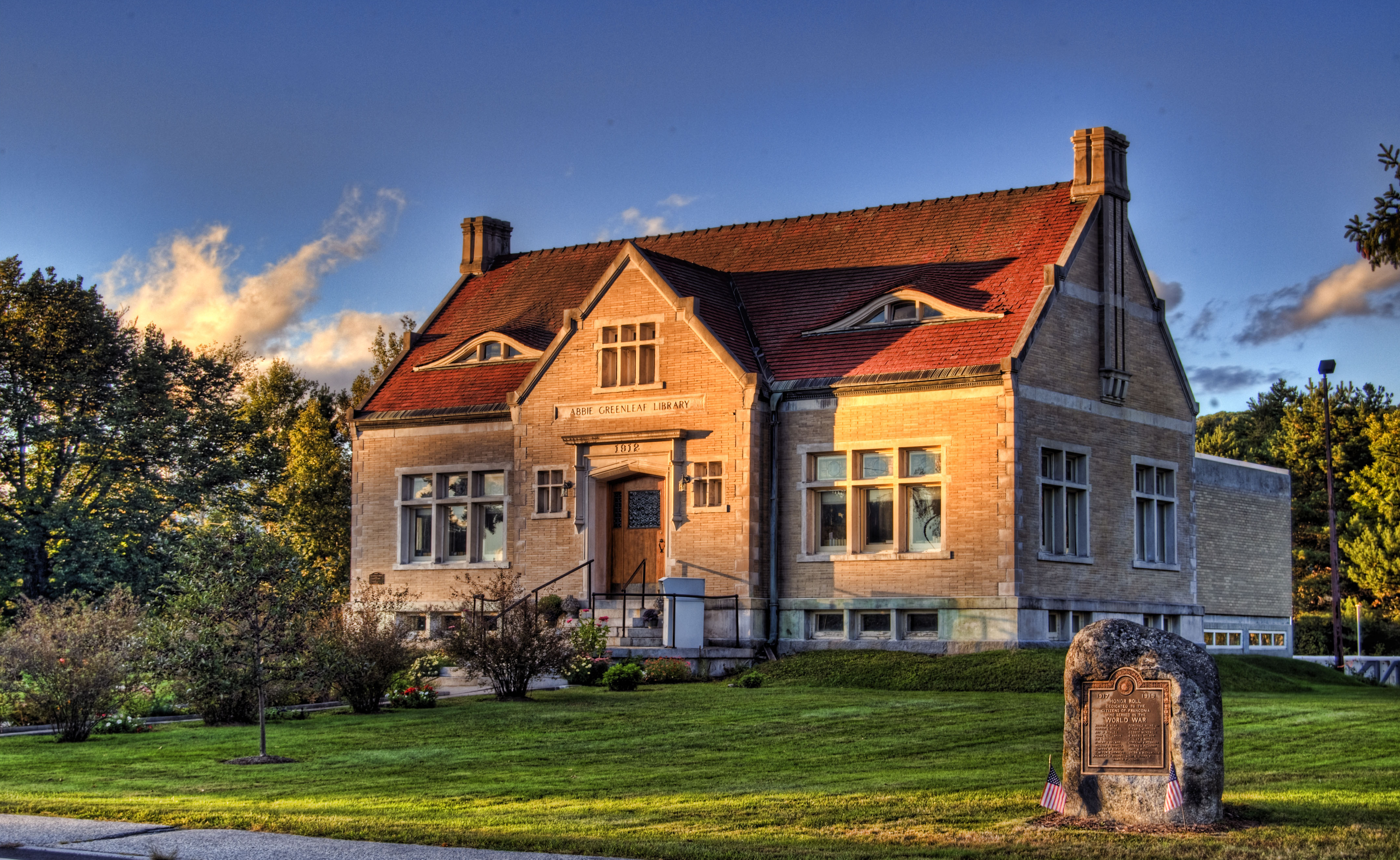
Abbie Greenleaf Library, Franconia, New Hampshire, 1912.

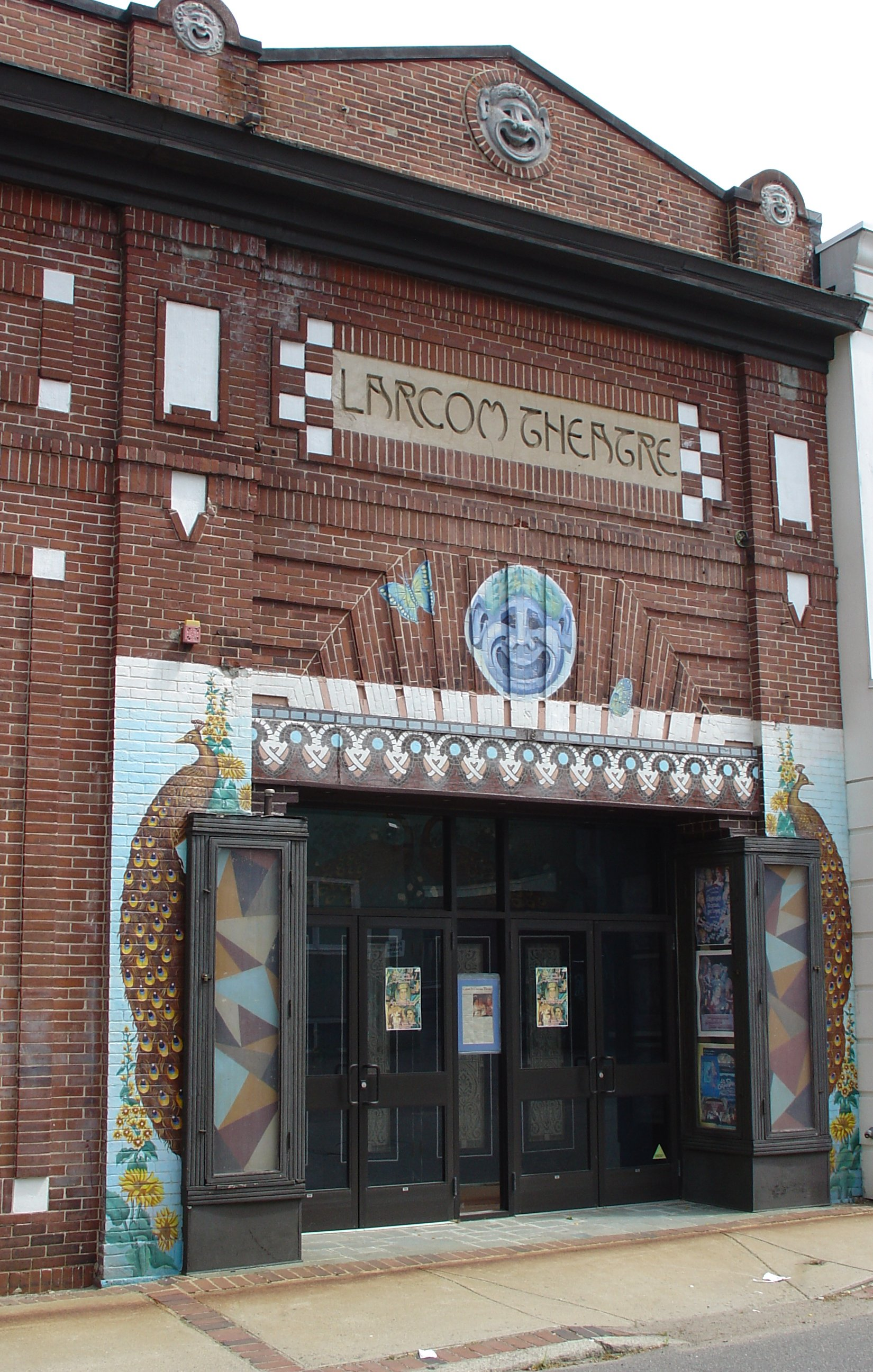
Larcom Theatre, Beverly, Massachusetts, 1912.

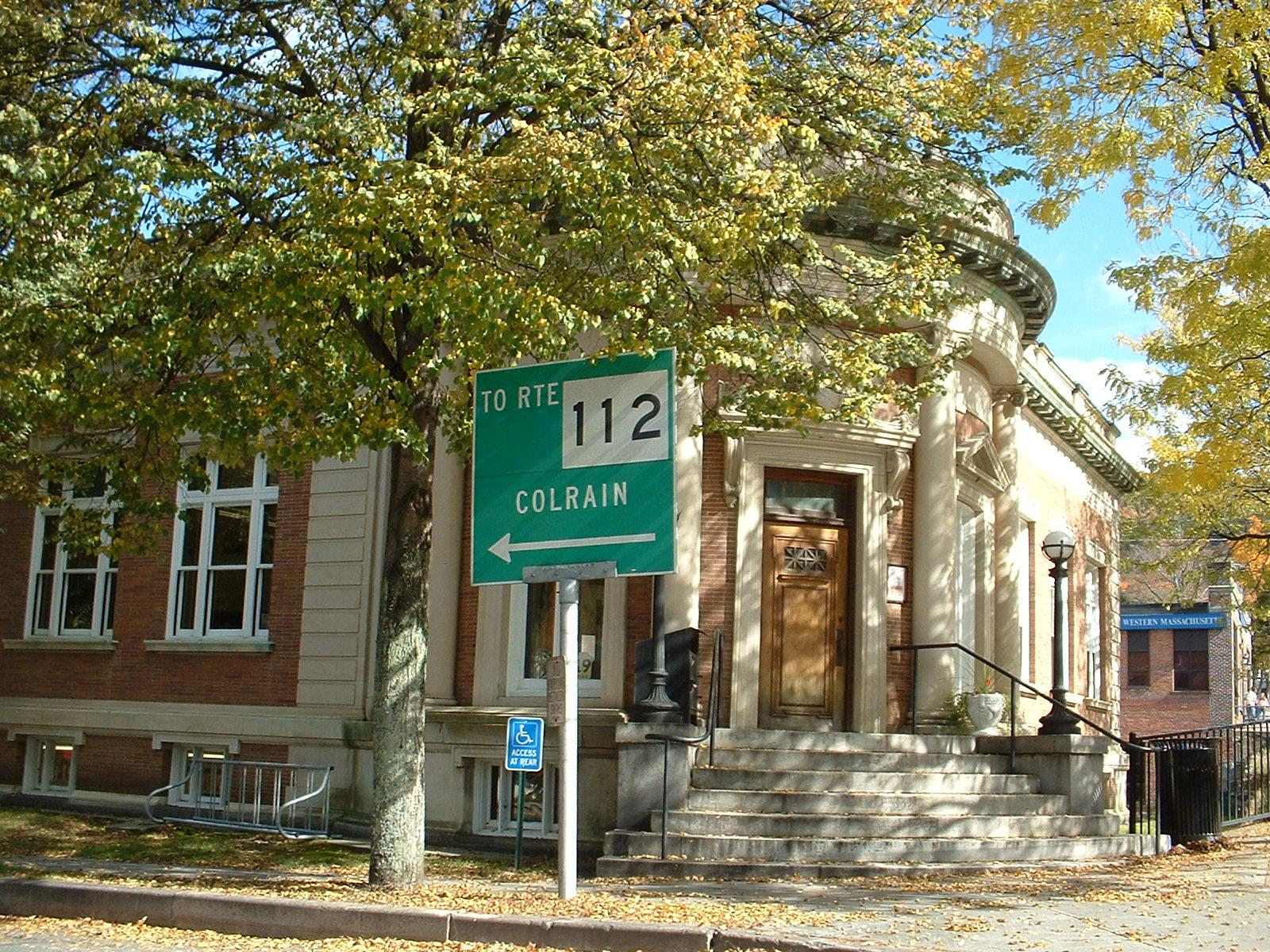
Arms Library, Shelburne Falls, Massachusetts, 1913–14.

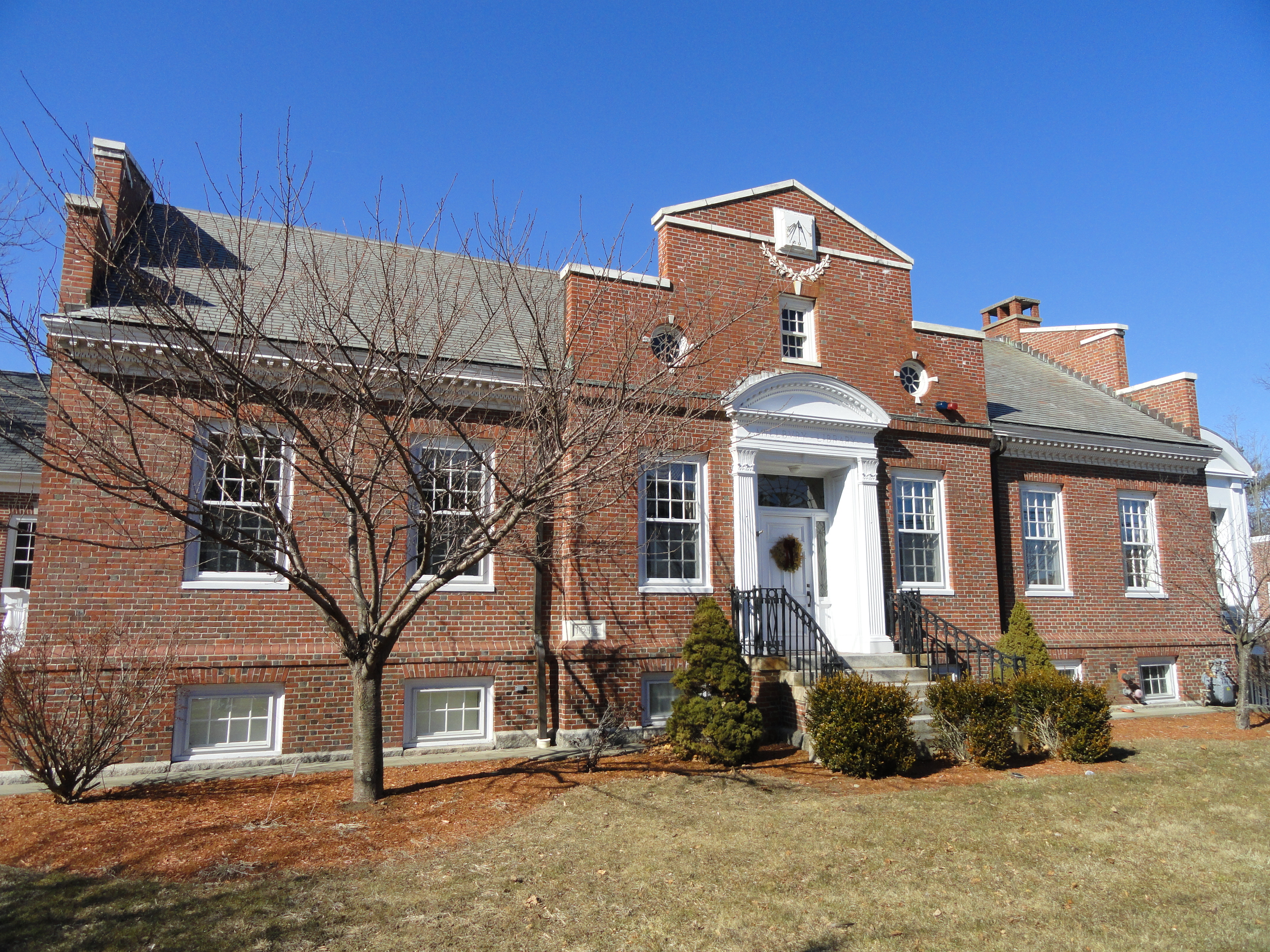
Millbury Public Library, Millbury, Massachusetts, 1915.

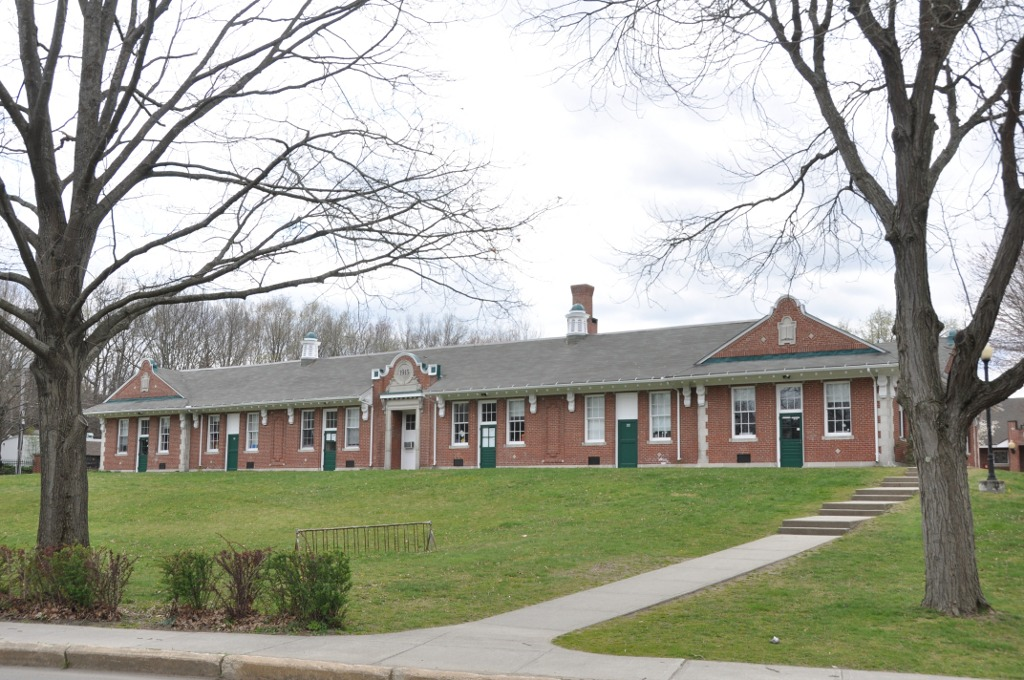
Newton Street School, Greenfield, Massachusetts, 1915.

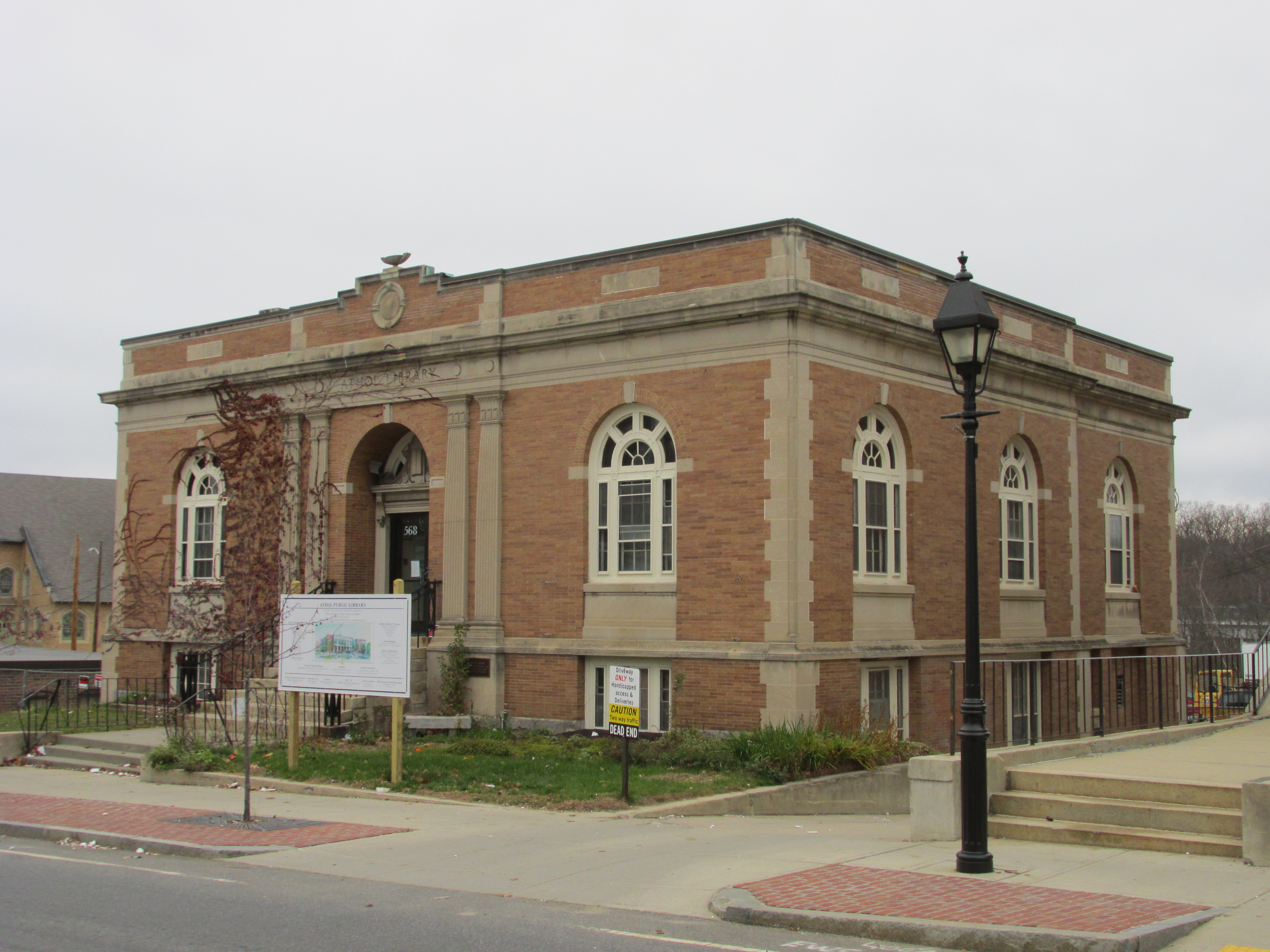
Athol Public Library, Athol, Massachusetts, 1917–18.

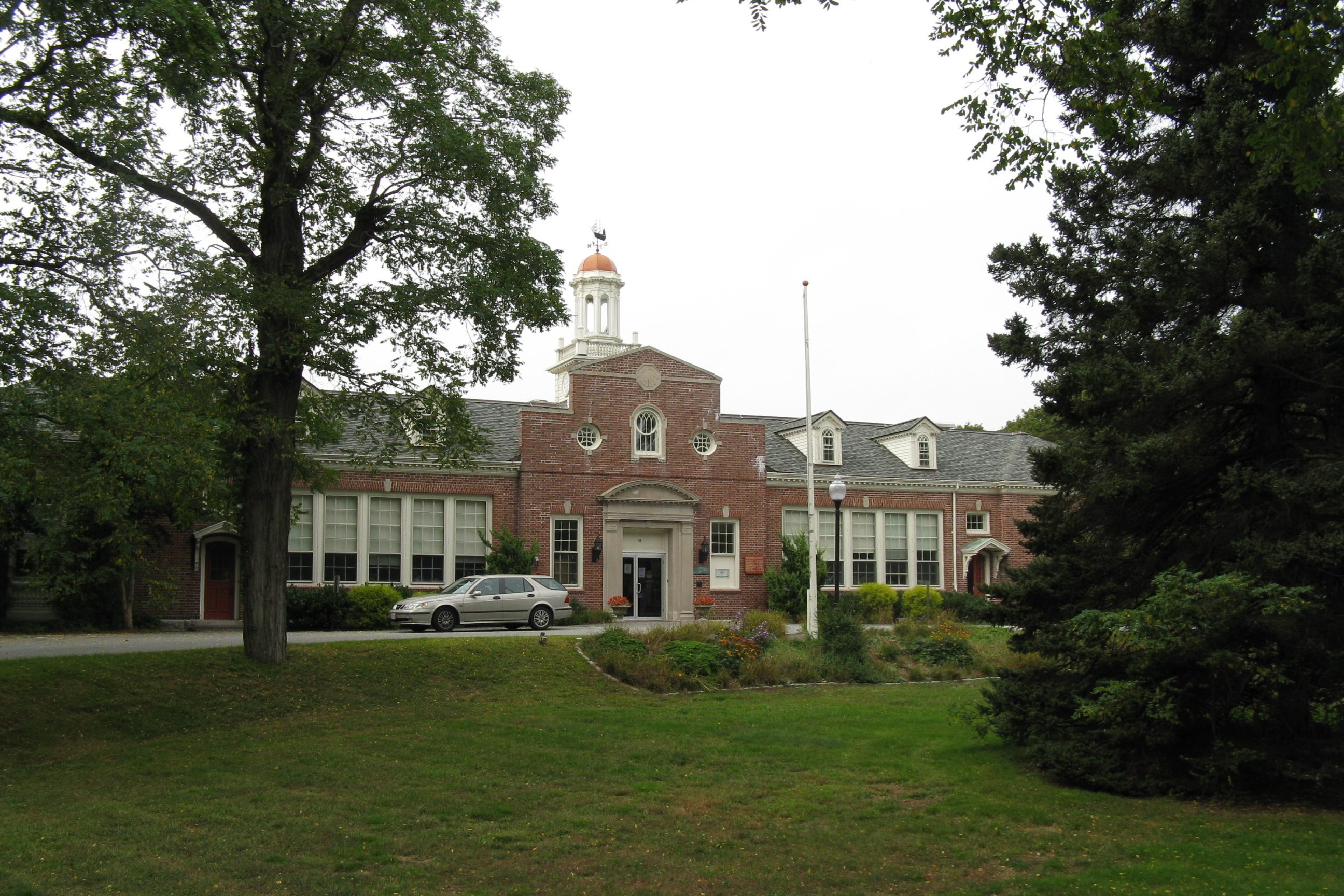
Bourne Grammar School, Bourne, Massachusetts, 1925.

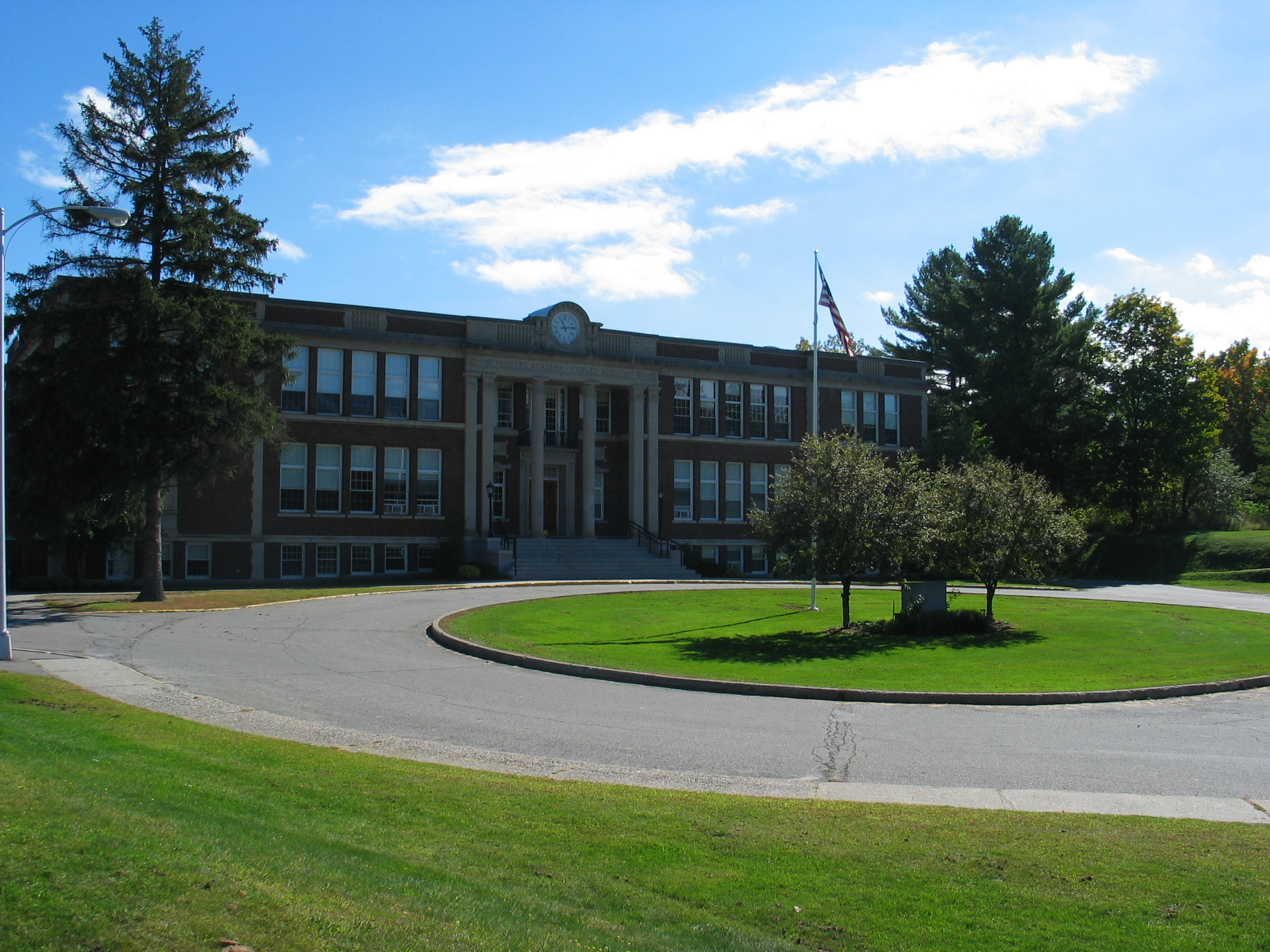
Peoples Academy, Morrisville, Vermont, 1927–28.

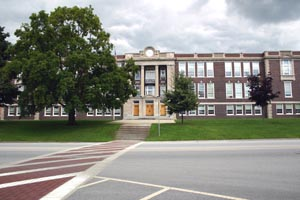
Bellows Free Academy, St. Albans, Vermont, 1930.

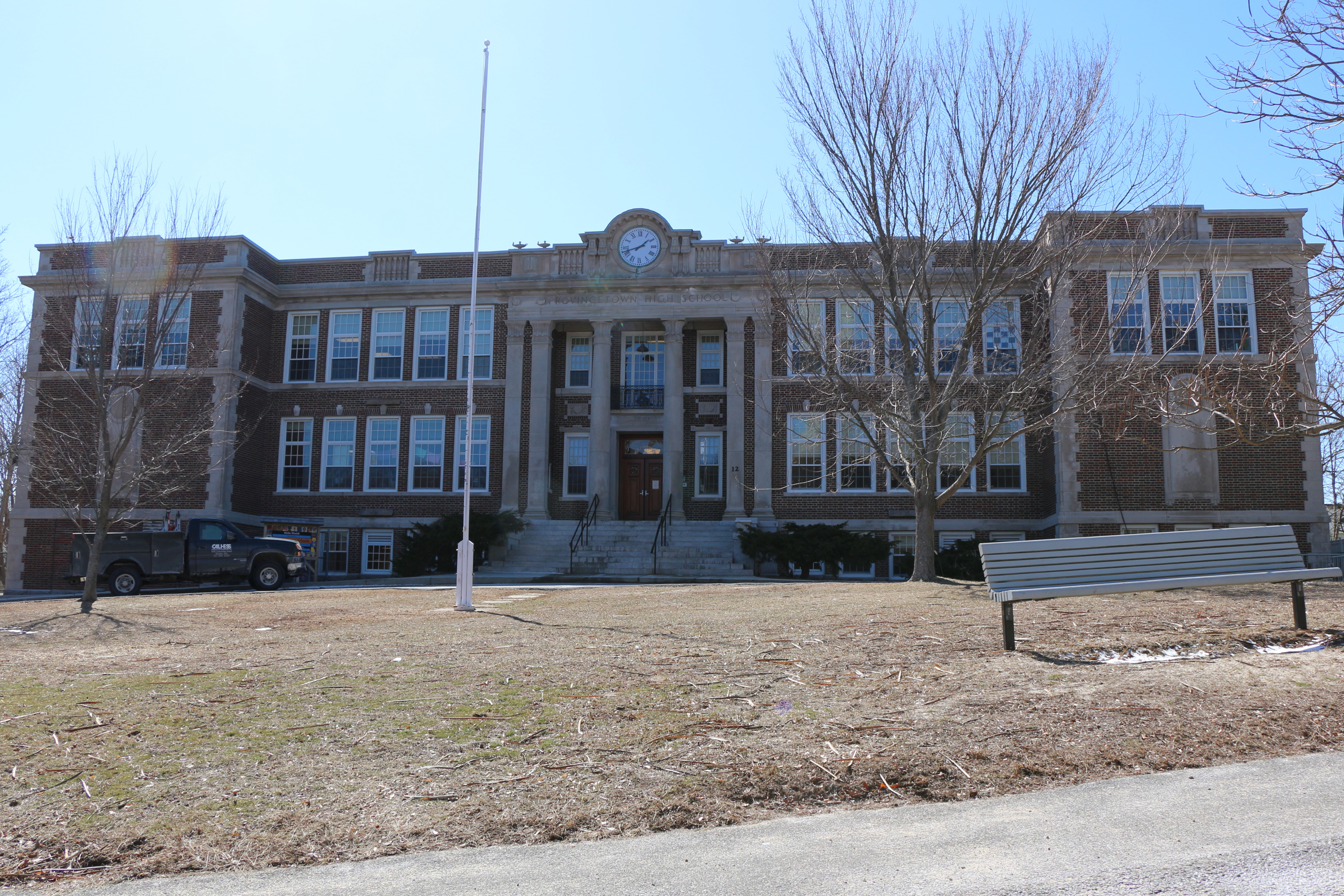
Provincetown High School, Provincetown, Massachusetts, 1931.
