= Rockingham Free Public Library =

Professional association for librarians in STATE

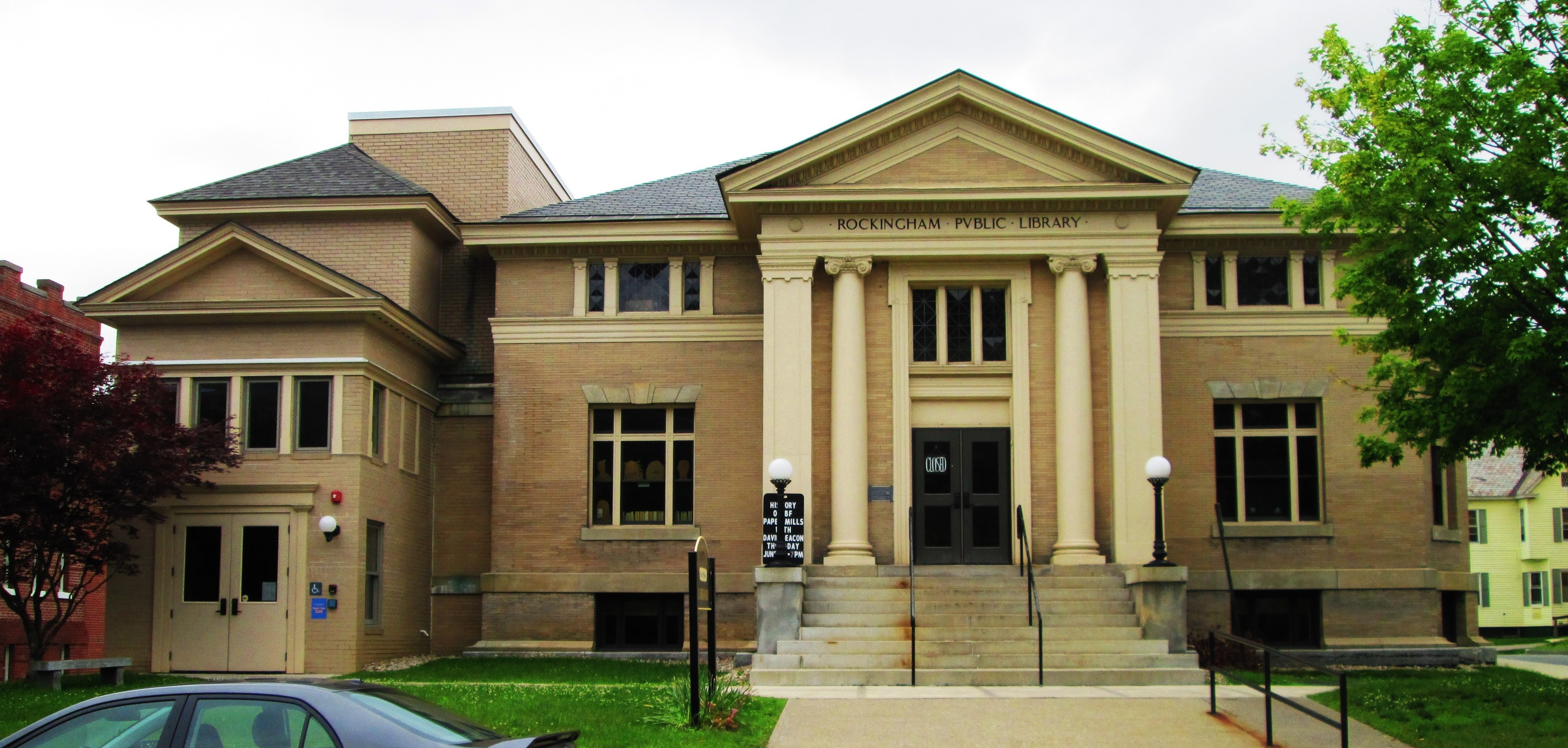
- 43.1308°N 72.4446°W
- Location: Bellows Falls, Vermont
- Established: November 23, 1909
- Architect(s): McLean & Wright

Collection
- Size: 44,000 titles

Other information
- Director: Ian Graham
- Employees: nine
- Website: rockinghamlibrary.org

Rockingham Free Public Library is one of four Carnegie Libraries in the state of Vermont. The building, in Bellows Falls, Vermont, a village of Rockingham, Vermont, was designed by Boston architects McLean & Wright in Classical Revival style. The Carnegie grant was offered in 1905. The town took a while to decide on allocating matching funds. The library officially opened on November 23, 1909. A children's annex was added to the building in 1929. In 2003 a new entryway and elevator were added for improved accessibility.

== Early history ==
Prior to this building being built, the Rockingham Free Public Library occupied a room in the lower floor of the town's opera house. Before that, there was a subscription library founded on October 28, 1799, as the Rockingham Library Society. The book collection moved around town occupying a room in the town's first high school, and a local drug store. The town's first public library card was issued in 1888.
