= Shedd-Porter Memorial Library =

- U.S. National Register of Historic Places
- NH State Register of Historic Places
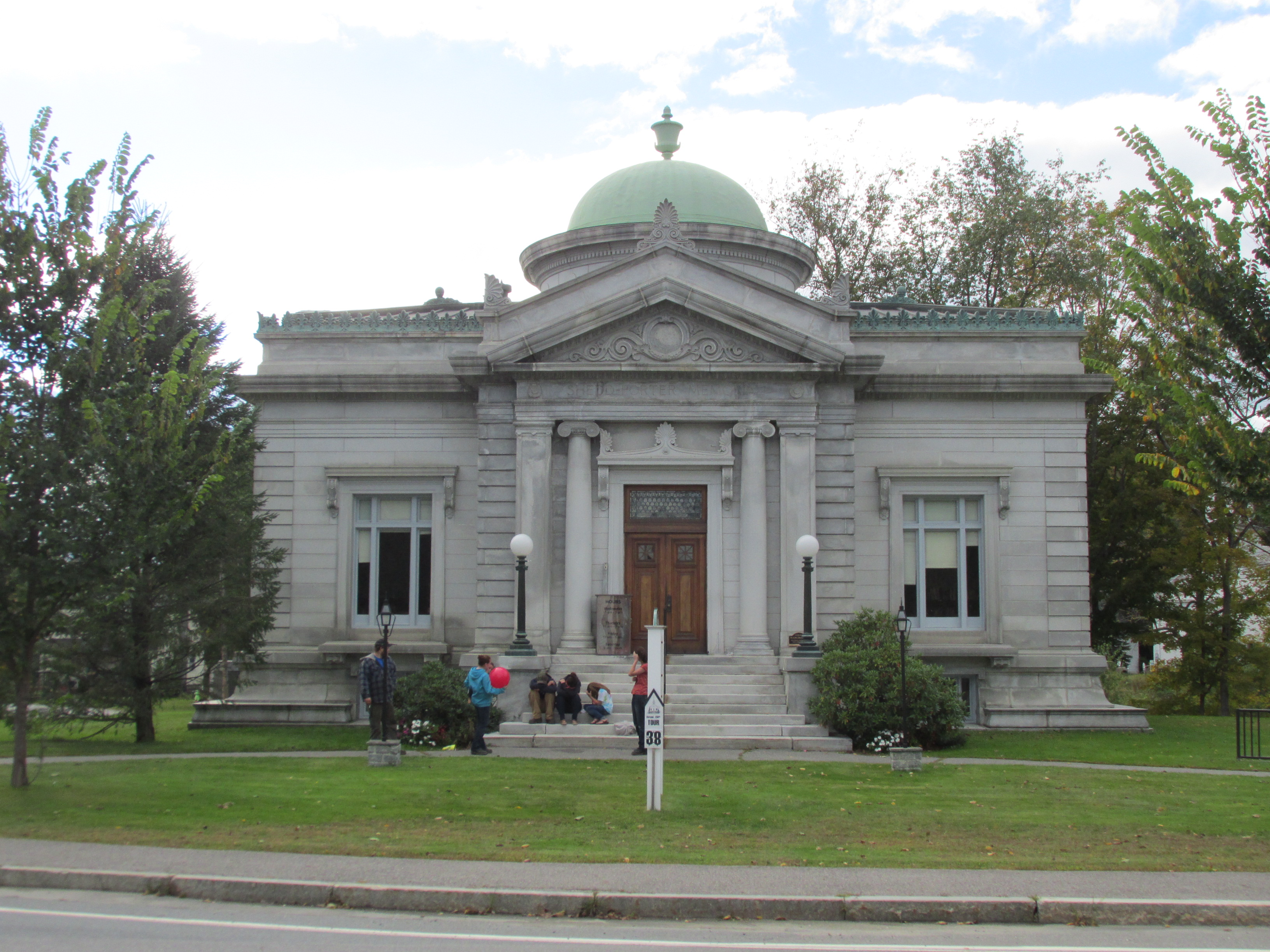

- Location within New Hampshire Location within the United States
- Location: 3 Main St., Alstead, New Hampshire
- Coordinates: 43.149384°N 72.361645°W
- Area: less than one acre
- Built: 1910
- Architect: McLean & Wright
- Architectural style: Beaux Arts
- NRHP reference No.: 10001086

Significant dates
- Added to NRHP: December 27, 2010
- Designated NHSRHP: January 24, 2011

The Shedd-Porter Memorial Library, located at 3 Main Street, is the public library of Alstead, New Hampshire. The library building was a gift to the town from John Graves Shedd and Mary Roenna (Porter) Shedd, and is a Beaux Arts building built in 1910 to a design by William H. McLean and Albert H. Wright. Shedd also donated 2,000 books to the library, whose collection now exceeds 10,000 volumes. The library building, one of the finest of the period in the state, was listed on the National Register of Historic Places in 2010, and the New Hampshire State Register of Historic Places in 2011.

== Architecture ==
The library stands in the village center of Alstead, on about 0.5 acres (0.20 ha) on the west side of Main Street just south of the Cold River. It is a small but imposing masonry structure, built out of granite with Classical Revival details. It is symmetrical and basically rectangular in shape, with projecting pavilions at the centers of the front and rear facades, and a domed roof at its center. Large windows flank the front pavilion, which houses the main entrance in an elaborate surround with Ionic columns, pilasters, and an elaborate entablature and pedimented gable.

The interior follows a typical plan for early 20th-century libraries, with an entry vestibule in the front pavilion, a central librarian's desk, and reading rooms to either side. The pavilion to the rear houses book stacks. The building's basement originally housed a small auditorium, which has been re-adapted for use as a children's collection and reading room.

The library building was the gift of John Graves Shedd, chief executive of Marshall Field & Company and an Alstead native, and his wife Mary Roenna (Porter) Shedd, a native of Langdon, and was given in memory of their parents.

== See also ==
- National Register of Historic Places listings in Cheshire County, New Hampshire
