= West Somerville Branch Library =

- U.S. National Register of Historic Places
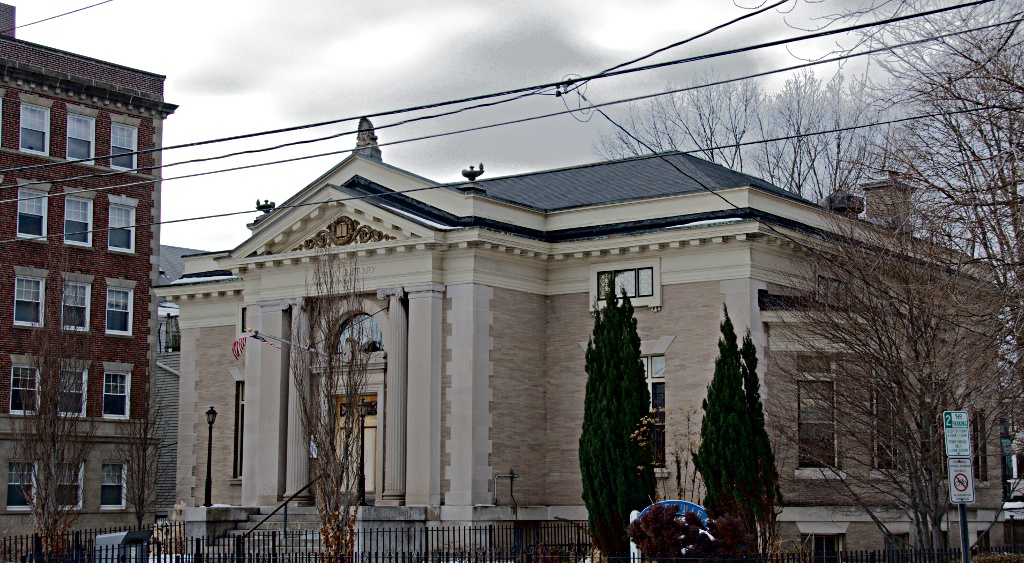

- Location within Massachusetts Location within the United States
- Location: 40 College Ave., Somerville, Massachusetts
- Coordinates: 42°23′53.0429″N 71°7′17.558″W
- Area: less than one acre
- Built: 1909
- Architect: McLean & Wright
- Architectural style: Classical Revival
- MPS: Somerville MPS
- NRHP reference No.: 89001248
- Added to NRHP: September 18, 1989

The West Somerville Branch Library is an active library in a historic building at 40 College Avenue in Somerville, Massachusetts, just outside Davis Square. It is an example of Classical Revival architecture, built in 1909 with funding support from Andrew Carnegie, and was the city's first branch library. It was listed on the National Register of Historic Places in 1989.

== Architecture and history ==
The West Somerville Branch Library is located on the west side of College Avenue, opposite Morrison Avenue, on the north side of Davis Square. It is a 1 1/2-story granite structure, with elaborate Classical Revival styling. The main facade, facing roughly southeast, is three bays wide, with a center projection housing the entrance, which is set in a round-arch opening flanked by fluted Ionic columns and broad square pilasters. The entry columns support a gabled pediment with a modillioned cornice. The building's corners are quoined, and it is capped by a shallow-pitch hip roof with a modillioned cornice. On each side of the building is a projecting round bay.

The building was designed by McLean & Wright of Boston, and was built in 1906–09 with funding from philanthropist Andrew Carnegie and the city. It is the city's best example of Classical Revival architecture, also exhibiting Beaux Arts details that were then in fashion. It was the first branch library in Somerville. The library opened in 1909, and is now part of the Minuteman Library Network system. In the 21st century, it was closed for substantial repairs and to make the building comply with the Americans with Disabilities Act; the project ceremonially broke ground in April 2019, and the library reopened to the public in July 2021.

== See also ==
- National Register of Historic Places listings in Somerville, Massachusetts
- Central Library (Somerville, Massachusetts)
