= Wilton Public and Gregg Free Library =

- U.S. National Register of Historic Places
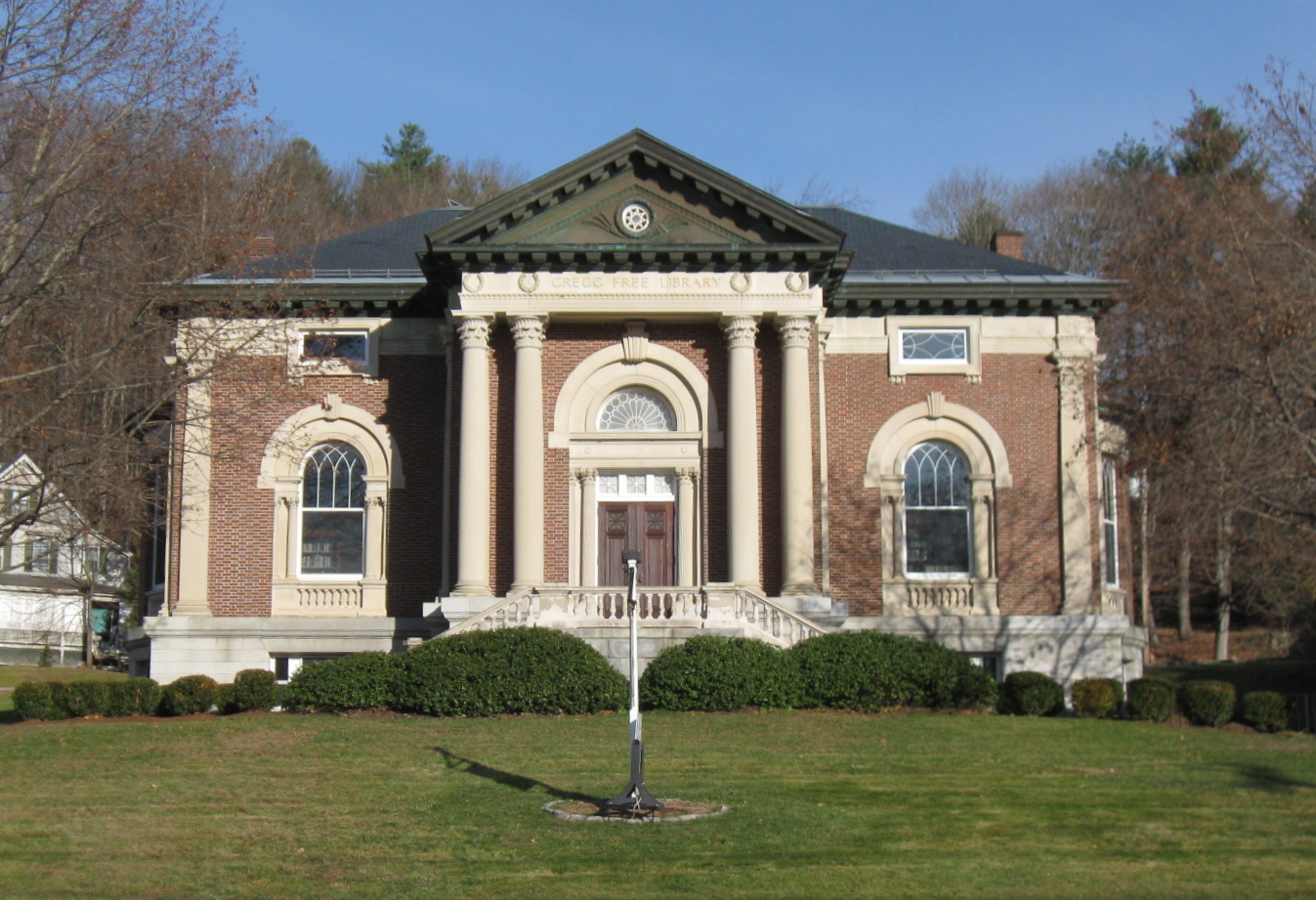

- Location within New Hampshire Location within the United States
- Location: Forest St., Wilton, New Hampshire
- Coordinates: 42°50′43″N 71°44′20″W
- Area: less than one acre
- Built: 1907
- Architect: McLean & Wright
- Architectural style: Classical Revival
- NRHP reference No.: 82001687
- Added to NRHP: January 11, 1982

The Wilton Public and Gregg Free Library is the public library of Wilton, New Hampshire. It is located in a Classical Revival brick building on Forest Street, near the north end of Wilton's downtown area. The building was designed by the Boston, Massachusetts, firm of McLean & Wright, and built 1905–07. It was a gift of David Almus Gregg, a local manufacturer of building parts; Gregg further gave the library an endowment in 1912. It was listed on the National Register of Historic Places in 1982.

== Description and history ==
The Wilton Public Library is located near the north end of Wilton's principal downtown thoroughfare, on the east side of Forest Street just beyond the junction of Main Street and Island Street. It is a 2 1/2-story masonry structure, built out of red brick with limestone trim. It is covered by a hip roof whose eave is studded with heavy modillion blocks. The main facade is three bays wide, with a projecting center bay topped by a fully pedimented gable and fronted by four large Corinthian columns. The outer bays house windows set in rounded-arch openings, with the openings surrounded by a keystoned arch, side pilasters, and a limestone balustrade below. The main entrance is in the center bay, flanked by smaller columns set in antis which rise to an entablature. Above this entablature is a large half-round transom with a keystoned arch.

David Almus Gregg was a native of Wilton who owned a successful building parts business in Nashua, manufacturing doors, window blinds, and window sashes. Gregg was significantly involved in the design and construction of the building, providing the highest quality building materials and contractors to the project, which was estimated to cost $100,000 when completed in 1907. He then followed up the building construction with an endowment for its care, given in 1912.

== See also ==
- National Register of Historic Places listings in Hillsborough County, New Hampshire
