= List of airports by IATA code: H =

The DST column shows the months in which Daylight Saving Time, a.k.a. Summer Time, begins and ends. A blank DST box usually indicates that the location stays on Standard Time all year, although in some cases the location stays on Summer Time all year. If a location is currently on DST, add one hour to the time in the Time column.

IATA	ICAO	Airport name	Location served	Time	DST
-HA-
HAA	ENHK	Hasvik Airport	Hasvik, Norway	UTC+01:00	Mar-Oct
HAB	KHAB	Marion County – Rankin Fite Airport	Hamilton, Alabama, United States	UTC−06:00	Mar-Nov
HAC	RJTH	Hachijojima Airport	Hachijō-jima (Hachijojima), Izu Islands, Japan	UTC+09:00	
HAD	ESMT	Halmstad Airport (Halmstad City Airport)	Halmstad, Sweden	UTC+01:00	Mar-Oct
HAF	KHAF	Half Moon Bay Airport	Half Moon Bay, California, United States	UTC−08:00	Mar-Nov
HAH	FMCH	Prince Said Ibrahim International Airport	Moroni, Comoros	UTC+03:00	
HAI	KHAI	Three Rivers Municipal Airport (Dr. Haines Flying Field)	Three Rivers, Michigan, United States	UTC−05:00	Mar-Nov
HAJ	EDDV	Hannover Airport	Hanover, Lower Saxony, Germany	UTC+01:00	Mar-Oct
HAK	ZJHK	Haikou Meilan International Airport	Haikou, Hainan, China	UTC+08:00	
HAL	FYHI	Halali Airport	Halali, Namibia	UTC+01:00	Sep-Apr
HAM	EDDH	Hamburg Airport	Hamburg, Germany	UTC+01:00	Mar-Oct
HAN	VVNB	Noi Bai International Airport	Hanoi, Vietnam	UTC+07:00	
HAO	KHAO	Butler County Regional Airport	Hamilton, Ohio, United States	UTC−05:00	Mar-Nov
HAQ	VRMH	Hanimaadhoo International Airport	Hanimaadhoo, Haa Dhaalu Atoll, Maldives	UTC+05:00	
HAR	KCXY	Capital City Airport (FAA: CXY)	Harrisburg, Pennsylvania, United States	UTC−05:00	Mar-Nov
HAS	OEHL	Ha'il Regional Airport	Ha'il (Hail), Saudi Arabia	UTC+03:00	
HAT	YHTL	Heathlands Airport	Heathlands, Queensland, Australia	UTC+10:00	
HAU	ENHD	Haugesund Airport, Karmøy	Haugesund, Norway	UTC+01:00	Mar-Oct
HAV	MUHA	José Martí International Airport	Havana, Cuba	UTC−05:00	Mar-Nov
HAW	EGFE	Haverfordwest Aerodrome	Haverfordwest, Wales, United Kingdom	UTC±00:00	Mar-Oct
HAY		Hacaritama Airport	Aguachica, Colombia	UTC−05:00	
HAZ		Hatzfeldthaven Airport	Hatzfeldthaven, Papua New Guinea	UTC+10:00	
-HB-
HBA	YMHB	Hobart Airport	Hobart, Tasmania, Australia	UTC+10:00	Oct-Apr
HBB		Hobbs Industrial Airpark	Hobbs, New Mexico, United States	UTC−07:00	Mar-Nov
HBD		Habi Airport	Habi, Papua New Guinea	UTC+10:00	
HBE	HEBA	Borg El Arab International Airport	Alexandria / Borg El Arab, Egypt	UTC+02:00	
HBG	KHBG	Hattiesburg Bobby L. Chain Municipal Airport	Hattiesburg, Mississippi, United States	UTC−06:00	Mar-Nov
HBH		Entrance Island Seaplane Base (Hobart Bay) (FAA: 2Z1)	Entrance Island, Alaska, United States	UTC−09:00	Mar-Nov
HBK		Holbrook Municipal Airport (FAA: P14)	Holbrook, Arizona, United States	UTC−07:00	
HBQ		Qilian Airport	Qilian, Qinghai, China		
HBR	KHBR	Hobart Regional Airport	Hobart, Oklahoma, United States	UTC−06:00	Mar-Nov
HBT		Hambantota Sea Plane Base	Hambantota, Sri Lanka	UTC+05:30	
HBU	ZMBS	Bulgan Airport, Khovd	Bulgan (Khovd Province), Mongolia	UTC+07:00	
HBX	VAHB	Hubli Airport	Hubli / Dharwad, Karnataka, India	UTC+05:30	
-HC-
HCA	KBPG	Big Spring McMahon–Wrinkle Airport (FAA: BPG)	Big Spring, Texas, United States	UTC−06:00	Mar-Nov
HCC		Columbia County Airport (FAA: 1B1)	Hudson, New York, United States	UTC−05:00	Mar-Nov
HCJ	ZGHC	Hechi Jinchengjiang Airport	Hechi, Guangxi, China	UTC+08:00	
HCM	HCME	Eyl Airport	Eyl, Somalia	UTC+03:00	
HCN	RCKW	Hengchun Airport	Hengchun, Taiwan	UTC+08:00	
HCQ	YHLC	Halls Creek Airport	Halls Creek, Western Australia, Australia	UTC+08:00	
HCR	PAHC	Holy Cross Airport (FAA: HCA)	Holy Cross, Alaska, United States	UTC−09:00	Mar-Nov
HCW	KCQW	Cheraw Municipal Airport (Lynch Bellinger Field, FAA: CQW)	Cheraw, South Carolina, United States	UTC−05:00	Mar-Nov
HCZ	ZGCZ	Chenzhou Beihu Airport	Chenzhou, Hunan, China	UTC+08:00	
-HD-
HDB	EDIU	Heidelberg Airport	Heidelberg, Baden-Württemberg, Germany	UTC+01:00	Mar-Oct
HDD	OPKD	Hyderabad Airport	Hyderabad, Pakistan	UTC+05:00	
HDE	KHDE	Brewster Field	Holdrege, Nebraska, United States	UTC−06:00	Mar-Nov
HDF	EDAH	Heringsdorf Airport	Heringsdorf, Mecklenburg-Vorpommern, Germany	UTC+01:00	Mar-Oct
HDG	ZBHD	Handan Airport	Handan, Hebei, China	UTC+08:00	
HDH	PHDH	Dillingham Airfield	Mokulēia, Hawaii, United States	UTC−10:00	
HDK	VRBK	Kulhudhuffushi Airport	Haa Dhaalu Atoll, Maldives	UTC+05:00	
HDM	OIHH	Hamadan Airport	Hamadan, Iran	UTC+03:30	Mar-Sep
HDN	KHDN	Yampa Valley Airport	Hayden, Colorado, United States	UTC−07:00	Mar-Nov
HDO	VIDX	Hindon Airport	Ghaziabad, Uttar Pradesh, India	UTC+05:30	
HDR	OIKP	Havadarya Airport	Bandar Abbas, Iran	UTC+03:30	Mar-Sep
HDS	FAHS	Air Force Base Hoedspruit	Hoedspruit, South Africa	UTC+02:00	
HDY	VTSS	Hat Yai International Airport	Hat Yai, Thailand	UTC+07:00	
-HE-
HEA	OAHR	Herat International Airport	Herat, Afghanistan	UTC+04:30	
HEB	VBHD	Hinthada Airport	Hinthada, Myanmar	UTC+06:30	
HED		Herendeen Bay Airport (FAA: AK33)	Herendeen Bay, Alaska, United States	UTC−09:00	Mar-Nov
HEE	KHEE	Thompson–Robbins Airport	Helena-West Helena, Arkansas, United States	UTC−06:00	Mar-Nov
HEH	VYHH	Heho Airport	Heho, Myanmar	UTC+06:30	
HEI	EDXB	Heide–Büsum Airport	Heide / Büsum, Schleswig-Holstein, Germany	UTC+01:00	Mar-Oct
HEK	ZYHE	Heihe Airport	Heihe, Heilongjiang, China	UTC+08:00	
HEL	EFHK	Helsinki Airport (Helsinki-Vantaa Airport)	Helsinki, Finland	UTC+02:00	Mar-Oct
HEM	EFHF	Helsinki-Malmi Airport	Helsinki, Finland	UTC+02:00	Mar-Oct
HEO		Haelogo Airport	Haelogo, Papua New Guinea	UTC+10:00	
HER	LGIR	Heraklion International Airport (Nikos Kazantzakis Airport)	Heraklion, Greece	UTC+02:00	Mar-Oct
HES	KHRI	Hermiston Municipal Airport (FAA: HRI)	Hermiston, Oregon, United States	UTC−08:00	Mar-Nov
HET	ZBHH	Hohhot Baita International Airport	Hohhot, Inner Mongolia, China	UTC+08:00	
HEZ	KHEZ	Natchez–Adams County Airport (Hardy–Anders Field)	Natchez, Mississippi, United States	UTC−06:00	Mar-Nov
-HF-
HFA	LLHA	Haifa Airport (Uri Michaeli Airport)	Haifa, Israel	UTC+02:00	Mar-Oct
HFD	KHFD	Hartford–Brainard Airport	Hartford, Connecticut, United States	UTC−05:00	Mar-Nov
HFE	ZSOF	Hefei Xinqiao International Airport (formerly Hefei Luogang International Airport)	Hefei, Anhui, China	UTC+08:00	
HFF	KHFF	Mackall Army Airfield	Hoffman, North Carolina, United States	UTC−05:00	Mar-Nov
HFN	BIHN	Hornafjörður Airport	Höfn, Iceland	UTC±00:00	
HFS	ESOH	Hagfors Airport	Hagfors, Sweden	UTC+01:00	Mar-Oct
HFT	ENHF	Hammerfest Airport	Hammerfest, Norway	UTC+01:00	Mar-Oct
-HG-
HGA	HCMH	Hargeisa International Airport (Egal Int'l)	Hargeisa, Somalia	UTC+03:00	
HGD	YHUG	Hughenden Airport	Hughenden, Queensland, Australia	UTC+10:00	
HGE	SVHG	Higuerote Airport	Higuerote, Venezuela	UTC−04:00	
HGH	ZSHC	Hangzhou Xiaoshan International Airport	Hangzhou, Zhejiang, China	UTC+08:00	
HGI	HSFA	Paloich Airport	Higlieg, Sudan	UTC+03:00	
HGL	EDXH	Heligoland Airfield	Heligoland, Schleswig-Holstein, Germany	UTC+01:00	Mar-Oct
HGN	VTCH	Mae Hong Son Airport	Mae Hong Son, Thailand	UTC+07:00	
HGO	DIKO	Korhogo Airport	Korhogo, Ivory Coast	UTC±00:00	
HGR	KHGR	Hagerstown Regional Airport (Richard A. Henson Field)	Hagerstown, Maryland, United States	UTC−05:00	Mar-Nov
HGS	GFHA	Hastings Airport	Freetown, Sierra Leone	UTC±00:00	
HGU	AYMH	Mount Hagen Airport	Mount Hagen, Papua New Guinea	UTC+10:00	
HGZ		Hog River Airport (FAA: 2AK6)	Hogatza, Alaska, United States	UTC−09:00	Mar-Nov
-HH-
HHE	RJSH	JMSDF Hachinohe Air Base	Hachinohe, Honshu, Japan	UTC+09:00	
HHH	KHXD	Hilton Head Airport (FAA: HXD)	Hilton Head Island, South Carolina, United States	UTC−05:00	Mar-Nov
HHI	PHHI	Wheeler Army Airfield	Wahiawa, Hawaii, United States	UTC−10:00	
HHN	EDFH	Frankfurt–Hahn Airport	Hahn, Rhineland-Palatinate, Germany	UTC+01:00	Mar-Oct
HHQ	VTPH	Hua Hin Airport	Hua Hin, Thailand	UTC+07:00	
HHR	KHHR	Hawthorne Municipal Airport (Jack Northrop Field)	Hawthorne, California, United States	UTC−08:00	Mar-Nov
HHZ	NTGH	Hikueru Airport	Hikueru Atoll, French Polynesia	UTC−10:00	
-HI-
HIA	ZSSH	Huai'an Lianshui Airport	Huai'an, Jiangsu, China	UTC+08:00	
HIB	KHIB	Range Regional Airport	Hibbing, Minnesota, United States	UTC−06:00	Mar-Nov
HID	YHID	Horn Island Airport	Horn Island, Queensland, Australia	UTC+10:00	
HIE	KHIE	Mount Washington Regional Airport	Whitefield, New Hampshire, United States	UTC−05:00	Mar-Nov
HIF	KHIF	Hill Air Force Base	Ogden, Utah, United States	UTC−07:00	Mar-Nov
HIG	YHHY	Highbury Airport	Highbury, Queensland, Australia	UTC+10:00	
HII	KHII	Lake Havasu City Airport	Lake Havasu City, Arizona, United States	UTC−07:00	
HIJ	RJOA	Hiroshima Airport	Hiroshima, Honshu, Japan	UTC+09:00	
HIL	HASL	Shilavo Airport	Shilavo, Ethiopia	UTC+03:00	
HIM	VCCH	Hingurakgoda Airport (Minneriya Airport)	Hingurakgoda, Sri Lanka	UTC+05:30	
HIN	RKPS	Sacheon Airport	Jinju, South Korea	UTC+09:00	
HIO	KHIO	Hillsboro Airport (Portland–Hillsboro Airport)	Hillsboro / Portland, Oregon, United States	UTC−08:00	Mar-Nov
HIP	YHDY	Headingly Airport	Headingly, Queensland, Australia	UTC+10:00	
HIR	AGGH	Honiara International Airport	Honiara, Guadalcanal, Solomon Islands	UTC+11:00	
HIT	AYHO	Haivaro Airport	Haivaro, Papua New Guinea	UTC+10:00	
HIW	RJBH	Hiroshima–Nishi Airport	Hiroshima, Honshu, Japan	UTC+09:00	
-HJ-
HJJ	ZGCJ	Huaihua Zhijiang Airport	Huaihua, Hunan, China	UTC+08:00	
HJR	VAKJ	Civil Aerodrome Khajuraho	Khajuraho, Madhya Pradesh, India	UTC+05:30	
HJT	ZMHU	Khujirt Airport	Khujirt, Mongolia	UTC+08:00	
-HK-
HKA	KHKA	Blytheville Municipal Airport	Blytheville, Arkansas, United States	UTC−06:00	Mar-Nov
HKB		Healy Lake Airport	Healy Lake, Alaska, United States	UTC−09:00	Mar-Nov
HKD	RJCH	Hakodate Airport	Hakodate, Hokkaido, Japan	UTC+09:00	
HKG	VHHH	Hong Kong International Airport (Chek Lap Kok Airport)	Hong Kong	UTC+08:00	
HKK	NZHK	Hokitika Airport	Hokitika, New Zealand	UTC+12:00	Sep-Apr
HKN	AYHK	Hoskins Airport	Kimbe, Papua New Guinea	UTC+10:00	
HKS	KHKS	Hawkins Field	Jackson, Mississippi, United States	UTC−06:00	Mar-Nov
HKT	VTSP	Phuket International Airport	Phuket, Thailand	UTC+07:00	
HKV	LBHS	Haskovo Malevo Airport	Haskovo, Bulgaria	UTC+02:00	Mar-Oct
HKY	KHKY	Hickory Regional Airport	Hickory, North Carolina, United States	UTC−05:00	Mar-Nov
-HL-
HLA	FALA	Lanseria International Airport	Johannesburg, South Africa	UTC+02:00	
HLB	KHLB	Hillenbrand Industries Airport	Batesville, Indiana, United States	UTC−05:00	Mar-Nov
HLC	KHLC	Hill City Municipal Airport	Hill City, Kansas, United States	UTC−06:00	Mar-Nov
HLD	ZBLA	Hulunbuir Hailar Airport	Hailar, Inner Mongolia, China	UTC+08:00	
HLE	FHSH	Saint Helena Airport	Jamestown, British Overseas Territory of Saint Helena, Ascension and Tristan da Cunha	UTC+00:00	
HLF	ESSF	Hultsfred-Vimmerby Airport	Hultsfred / Vimmerby, Sweden	UTC+01:00	Mar-Oct
HLG	KHLG	Wheeling Ohio County Airport	Wheeling, West Virginia, United States	UTC−05:00	Mar-Nov
HLH	ZBUL	Ulanhot Airport	Ulanhot, Inner Mongolia, China	UTC+08:00	
HLI	KCVH	Hollister Municipal Airport (FAA: CVH)	Hollister, California, United States	UTC−08:00	Mar-Nov
HLL	YHIL	Hillside Airport	Hillside, Western Australia, Australia	UTC+08:00	
HLM	KHLM	Park Township Airport	Holland, Michigan, United States	UTC−05:00	Mar-Nov
HLN	KHLN	Helena Regional Airport	Helena, Montana, United States	UTC−07:00	Mar-Nov
HLP	WIHH	Halim Perdanakusuma International Airport	Jakarta, Indonesia	UTC+07:00	
HLR	KHLR	Yoakum–DeFrenn Army Heliport	Fort Cavazos / Killeen, Texas, United States	UTC−06:00	Mar-Nov
HLS	YSTH	St Helens Airport	St Helens, Tasmania, Australia	UTC+10:00	Oct-Apr
HLT	YHML	Hamilton Airport	Hamilton, Victoria, Australia	UTC+10:00	Oct-Apr
HLV		Helenvale Airport	Helenvale, Queensland, Australia	UTC+10:00	
HLW	FAHL	Hluhluwe Airport	Hluhluwe, South Africa	UTC+02:00	
HLZ	NZHN	Hamilton Airport	Hamilton, New Zealand	UTC+12:00	Sep-Apr
-HM-
HMA	USHH	Khanty-Mansiysk Airport	Khanty-Mansiysk, Khanty-Mansi Autonomous Okrug, Russia	UTC+05:00	
HMB	HEMK	Sohag International Airport	Sohag, Egypt	UTC+02:00	
HME	DAUH	Oued Irara–Krim Belkacem Airport	Hassi Messaoud, Algeria	UTC+01:00	
HMG	YHMB	Hermannsburg Airport	Hermannsburg, Northern Territory, Australia	UTC+09:30	
HMI	ZWHM	Hami Airport (Kumul Airport)	Hami, Xinjiang, China	UTC+06:00	
HMJ	UKLH	Khmelnytskyi Airport	Khmelnytsky, Ukraine	UTC+02:00	Mar-Oct
HMN	KHMN	Holloman Air Force Base	Alamogordo, New Mexico, United States	UTC−07:00	Mar-Nov
HMO	MMHO	General Ignacio Pesqueira García International Airport	Hermosillo, Sonora, Mexico	UTC−07:00	
HMR	ENHA	Hamar Airport, Stafsberg	Hamar, Norway	UTC+01:00	Mar-Oct
HMT	KHMT	Hemet-Ryan Airport	Hemet, California, United States	UTC−08:00	Mar-Nov
HMV	ESUT	Hemavan Tärnaby Airport	Hemavan / Tärnaby, Sweden	UTC+01:00	Mar-Oct
HMY	RKTP	Seosan Air Base	Seosan, South Korea	UTC+09:00	
-HN-
HNA	RJSI	Hanamaki Airport	Hanamaki, Honshu, Japan	UTC+09:00	
HNB	KHNB	Huntingburg Airport	Huntingburg, Indiana, United States	UTC−05:00	Mar-Nov
HNC	KHSE	Billy Mitchell Airport (FAA: HSE)	Hatteras, North Carolina, United States	UTC−05:00	Mar-Nov
HND	RJTT	Haneda Airport	Tokyo, Honshu, Japan	UTC+09:00	
HNH	PAOH	Hoonah Airport	Hoonah, Alaska, United States	UTC−09:00	Mar-Nov
HNI		Heiweni Airport	Heiweni, Papua New Guinea	UTC+10:00	
HNL	PHNL	Honolulu International Airport	Honolulu, Hawaii, United States	UTC−10:00	
HNM	PHHN	Hana Airport	Hana, Hawaii, United States	UTC−10:00	
HNN		Honinabi Airport	Honinabi, Papua New Guinea	UTC+10:00	
HNS	PAHN	Haines Airport	Haines, Alaska, United States	UTC−09:00	Mar-Nov
HNY	ZGHY	Hengyang Nanyue Airport	Hengyang, Hunan, China	UTC+08:00	
-HO-
HOA	HKHO	Hola Airport	Hola, Kenya	UTC+03:00	
HOB	KHOB	Lea County Regional Airport	Hobbs, New Mexico, United States	UTC−07:00	Mar-Nov
HOC		Komako Airport	Komako, Papua New Guinea	UTC+10:00	
HOD	OYHD	Hodeida International Airport	Al Hudaydah (Hodeida), Yemen	UTC+03:00	
HOE	VLHS	Ban Huoeisay Airport	Ban Houayxay (Ban Huoeisay), Laos	UTC+07:00	
HOF	OEAH	Al-Ahsa International Airport	Hofuf, Saudi Arabia	UTC+03:00	
HOG	MUHG	Frank País Airport	Holguín, Cuba	UTC−05:00	Mar-Nov
HOH	LOIH	Hohenems-Dornbirn Airport	Dornbirn, Austria	UTC+01:00	Mar-Oct
HOI	NTTO	Hao Airport	Hao, Tuamotus, French Polynesia	UTC−10:00	
HOK	YHOO	Hooker Creek Airport	Lajamanu, Northern Territory, Australia	UTC+09:30	
HOM	PAHO	Homer Airport	Homer, Alaska, United States	UTC−09:00	Mar-Nov
HON	KHON	Huron Regional Airport	Huron, South Dakota, United States	UTC−06:00	Mar-Nov
HOO		Nhon Co Airport	Quang Duc, Vietnam	UTC+07:00	
HOP	KHOP	Campbell Army Airfield	Fort Campbell / Hopkinsville, Kentucky, United States	UTC−06:00	Mar-Nov
HOQ	EDQM	Hof–Plauen Airport	Hof, Bavaria, Germany	UTC+01:00	Mar-Oct
HOR	LPHR	Horta Airport	Horta, Azores, Portugal	UTC−01:00	Mar-Oct
HOS	SAHC	Chos Malal Airport	Chos Malal, Neuquén, Argentina	UTC−03:00	
HOT	KHOT	Memorial Field Airport	Hot Springs, Arkansas, United States	UTC−06:00	Mar-Nov
HOU	KHOU	William P. Hobby Airport	Houston, Texas, United States	UTC−06:00	Mar-Nov
HOV	ENOV	Ørsta–Volda Airport, Hovden	Ørsta / Volda, Norway	UTC+01:00	Mar-Oct
HOX	VYHL	Homalin Airport	Homalin, Myanmar	UTC+06:30	
HOY		Hoy Island Airport	Longhope, Scotland, United Kingdom	UTC±00:00	Mar-Oct
-HP-
HPA	NFTL	Lifuka Island Airport (Salote Pilolevu Airport)	Lifuka, Haʻapai, Tonga	UTC+13:00	Nov-Jan
HPB	PAHP	Hooper Bay Airport	Hooper Bay, Alaska, United States	UTC−09:00	Mar-Nov
HPE		Hopevale Airport	Hopevale, Queensland, Australia	UTC+10:00	
HPG	ZHSN	Shennongjia Hongping Airport	Shennongjia, Hubei, China	UTC+08:00	
HPH	VVCI	Cat Bi International Airport	Haiphong, Vietnam	UTC+07:00	
HPN	KHPN	Westchester County Airport	White Plains, New York, United States	UTC−05:00	Mar-Nov
HPT	KHPT	Hampton Municipal Airport	Hampton, Iowa, United States	UTC−06:00	Mar-Nov
HPV		Princeville Airport (FAA: HI01)	Hanalei, Hawaii, United States	UTC−10:00	
HPY	KHPY	Baytown Airport	Baytown, Texas, United States	UTC−06:00	Mar-Nov
-HQ-
HQL	ZWTK	Tashkurgan Khunjerab Airport	Tashkurgan, Xinjiang, China	UTC+08:00	
HQM	KHQM	Bowerman Airport	Hoquiam, Washington, United States	UTC−08:00	Mar-Nov
-HR-
HRB	ZYHB	Harbin Taiping International Airport	Harbin, Heilongjiang, China	UTC+08:00	
HRC		Zhayrem Airport	Zhayrem, Kazakhstan	UTC+06:00	
HRE	FVHA	Harare International Airport	Harare, Zimbabwe	UTC+02:00	
HRG	HEGN	Hurghada International Airport	Hurghada, Egypt	UTC+02:00	
HRI	VCRI	Mattala Rajapaksa International Airport	Hambantota, Sri Lanka	UTC+05:30	
HRK	UKHH	Kharkiv International Airport (Osnova Airport)	Kharkiv, Ukraine	UTC+02:00	Mar-Oct
HRL	KHRL	Valley International Airport	Harlingen, Texas, United States	UTC−06:00	Mar-Nov
HRM	DAFH	Hassi R'Mel Airport (Tilrempt Airport)	Hassi R'Mel, Algeria	UTC+01:00	
HRO	KHRO	Boone County Airport	Harrison, Arkansas, United States	UTC−06:00	Mar-Nov
HRR		La Herrera Airport	La Herrera, Colombia	UTC−05:00	
HRS	FAHR	Harrismith Airport	Harrismith, South Africa	UTC+02:00	
HRT	EGXU	RAF Linton-on-Ouse	Linton-on-Ouse, England, United Kingdom	UTC±00:00	Mar-Oct
HRY	YHBY	Henbury Airport	Henbury, Northern Territory, Australia	UTC+09:30	
HRZ	SSHZ	Horizontina Airport	Horizontina, Rio Grande do Sul, Brazil	UTC−03:00	
-HS-
HSA	UAIT	Hazret Sultan International Airport	Turkistan, Turkistan Region, Kazakhstan	UTC+06:00	
HSB	KHSB	Harrisburg-Raleigh Airport	Harrisburg, Illinois, United States	UTC−06:00	Mar-Nov
HSC		Shaoguan Guitou Airport	Shaoguan, Guangdong, China	UTC+08:00	
HSF	ZYSD	Suifenhe Dongning Airport	Suifenhe, Heilongjiang, China	UTC+08:00	
HSG	RJFS	Saga Airport	Saga, Kyushu, Japan	UTC+09:00	
HSH	KHND	Henderson Executive Airport (FAA: HND)	Las Vegas, Nevada, United States	UTC−08:00	Mar-Nov
HSI	KHSI	Hastings Municipal Airport	Hastings, Nebraska, United States	UTC−06:00	Mar-Nov
HSJ		Zhengzhou Shangjie Airport	Zhengzhou, Henan, China	UTC+08:00	
HSK	LEHC	Huesca–Pirineos Airport	Huesca, Aragon, Spain	UTC+01:00	Mar-Oct
HSL	PAHL	Huslia Airport (FAA: HLA)	Huslia, Alaska, United States	UTC−09:00	Mar-Nov
HSM	YHSM	Horsham Airport	Horsham, Victoria, Australia	UTC+10:00	Oct-Apr
HSN	ZSZS	Zhoushan Putuoshan Airport	Zhoushan, Zhejiang, China	UTC+08:00	
HSP	KHSP	Ingalls Field	Hot Springs, Virginia, United States	UTC−05:00	Mar-Nov
HSR	VAHS	Rajkot International Airport	Rajkot, Gujarat, India	UTC+05:30	
HSS	VIHR	Hisar Airport	Hisar, Haryana, India	UTC+05:30	
HST	KHST	Homestead Air Reserve Base	Homestead, Florida, United States	UTC−05:00	Mar-Nov
HSV	KHSV	Huntsville International Airport (Carl T. Jones Field)	Huntsville, Alabama, United States	UTC−06:00	Mar-Nov
HSZ	RCPO	Hsinchu Air Base	Hsinchu, Taiwan	UTC+08:00	
-HT-
HTA	UIAA	Chita International Airport (Kadala Airport)	Chita, Zabaykalsky Krai, Russia	UTC+09:00	
HTG	UOHH	Khatanga Airport	Khatanga, Krasnoyarsk Krai, Russia	UTC+07:00	
HTH	KHTH	Hawthorne Industrial Airport	Hawthorne, Nevada, United States	UTC−08:00	Mar-Nov
HTI	YBHM	Hamilton Island Airport	Hamilton Island, Queensland, Australia	UTC+10:00	
HTL	KHTL	Roscommon County–Blodgett Memorial Airport	Houghton Lake, Michigan, United States	UTC−05:00	Mar-Nov
HTM	ZMHG	Khatgal Airport	Khatgal, Mongolia	UTC+07:00	
HTN	ZWTN	Hotan Airport	Hotan, Xinjiang, China	UTC+06:00	
HTO	KHTO	East Hampton Airport	East Hampton, New York, United States	UTC−05:00	Mar-Nov
HTR	RORH	Hateruma Airport	Hateruma, Yaeyama Islands, Japan	UTC+09:00	
HTS	KHTS	Tri-State Airport (Milton J. Ferguson Field)	Huntington, West Virginia, United States	UTC−05:00	Mar-Nov
HTT		Huatugou Airport	Huatugou, Qinghai, China	UTC+08:00	
HTU	YHPN	Hopetoun Airport	Hopetoun, Victoria, Australia	UTC+10:00	Oct-Apr
HTV	KUTS	Huntsville Municipal Airport (Bruce Brothers Regional)	Huntsville, Texas, United States	UTC−06:00	Mar-Nov
HTW	KHTW	Lawrence County Airpark	Chesapeake / Huntington (WV), Ohio, United States	UTC−05:00	Mar-Nov
HTY	LTDA	Hatay Airport	Hatay, Turkey	UTC+03:00	
HTZ	SKHC	Hato Corozal Airport	Hato Corozal, Colombia	UTC−05:00	
-HU-
HUA	KHUA	Redstone Army Airfield	Redstone Arsenal / Huntsville, Alabama, United States	UTC−06:00	Mar-Nov
HUB	YHBR	Humbert River Airport	Humbert River, Northern Territory, Australia	UTC+09:30	
HUC		Humacao Airport	Humacao, Puerto Rico, United States	UTC−04:00	
HUD		Humboldt Municipal Airport (FAA: 0K7)	Humboldt, Iowa, United States	UTC−06:00	Mar-Nov
HUE	HAHU	Humera Airport	Humera, Ethiopia	UTC+03:00	
HUF	KHUF	Terre Haute International Airport (Hulman Field)	Terre Haute, Indiana, United States	UTC−05:00	Mar-Nov
HUG	MGHT	Huehuetenango Airport	Huehuetenango, Guatemala	UTC−06:00	
HUH	NTTH	Huahine – Fare Airport	Huahine, Society Islands, French Polynesia	UTC−10:00	
HUI	VVPB	Phu Bai International Airport	Huế, Vietnam	UTC+07:00	
HUJ	KHHW	Stan Stamper Municipal Airport (FAA: HHW)	Hugo, Oklahoma, United States	UTC−06:00	Mar-Nov
HUK		Hukuntsi Airport	Hukuntsi, Botswana	UTC+02:00	
HUL	KHUL	Houlton International Airport	Houlton, Maine, United States	UTC−05:00	Mar-Nov
HUM	KHUM	Houma–Terrebonne Airport	Houma, Louisiana, United States	UTC−06:00	Mar-Nov
HUN	RCYU	Hualien Airport	Hualien, Taiwan	UTC+08:00	
HUO	ZBHZ	Holingol Huolinhe Airport	Holingol (Huolinguole), Inner Mongolia, China	UTC+08:00	
HUQ	HLON	Hun Airport	Hun, Libya	UTC+02:00	
HUS	PAHU	Hughes Airport	Hughes, Alaska, United States	UTC−09:00	Mar-Nov
HUT	KHUT	Hutchinson Municipal Airport	Hutchinson, Kansas, United States	UTC−06:00	Mar-Nov
HUU	SPNC	Alférez FAP David Figueroa Fernandini Airport	Huánuco, Peru	UTC−05:00	
HUV	ESNH	Hudiksvall Airport	Hudiksvall, Sweden	UTC+01:00	Mar-Oct
HUW	SWHT	Francisco Correa da Cruz Airport	Humaitá, Amazonas, Brazil	UTC−04:00	
HUX	MMBT	Bahías de Huatulco International Airport	Huatulco, Oaxaca, Mexico	UTC−06:00	Apr-Oct
HUY	EGNJ	Humberside Airport	Kingston upon Hull, England, United Kingdom	UTC±00:00	Mar-Oct
HUZ	ZGHZ	Huizhou Pingtan Airport	Huizhou, Guangdong, China	UTC+08:00	
-HV-
HVA	FMNL	Analalava Airport	Analalava, Madagascar	UTC+03:00	
HVB	YHBA	Hervey Bay Airport	Hervey Bay, Queensland, Australia	UTC+10:00	
HVD	ZMKD	Khovd Airport	Khovd, Mongolia	UTC+07:00	
HVE	KHVE	Hanksville Airport	Hanksville, Utah, United States	UTC−07:00	Mar-Nov
HVG	ENHV	Honningsvåg Airport, Valan	Honningsvåg, Norway	UTC+01:00	Mar-Oct
HVK	BIHK	Hólmavík Airport	Hólmavík, Iceland	UTC±00:00	
HVN	KHVN	Tweed New Haven Airport	New Haven, Connecticut, United States	UTC−05:00	Mar-Nov
HVR	KHVR	Havre City–County Airport	Havre, Montana, United States	UTC−07:00	Mar-Nov
HVS	KHVS	Hartsville Regional Airport	Hartsville, South Carolina, United States	UTC−05:00	Mar-Nov
-HW-
HWA		Hawabango Airport	Hawabango, Papua New Guinea	UTC+10:00	
HWD	KHWD	Hayward Executive Airport	Hayward, California, United States	UTC−08:00	Mar-Nov
HWI		Hawk Inlet Seaplane Base	Hawk Inlet, Alaska, United States	UTC−09:00	Mar-Nov
HWK	YHAW	Wilpena Pound Airport	Hawker, South Australia, Australia	UTC+09:30	Oct-Apr
HWN	FVWN	Hwange National Park Airport	Hwange National Park, Zimbabwe	UTC+02:00	
HWO	KHWO	North Perry Airport	Hollywood, Florida, United States	UTC−05:00	Mar-Nov
HWR	VIHX	Shaheed Kartar Singh Sarabha International Airport	Ludhiana, Punjab, India	UTC+05:30	
-HX-
HXD	ZLDL	Delingha Airport	Delingha, Qinghai, China	UTC+08:00	
HXX	YHAY	Hay Airport	Hay, New South Wales, Australia	UTC+10:00	Oct-Apr
-HY-
HYA	KHYA	Barnstable Municipal Airport (Boardman/Polando Field)	Hyannis, Massachusetts, United States	UTC−05:00	Mar-Nov
HYC	EGTB	Wycombe Air Park	High Wycombe, England, United Kingdom	UTC±00:00	Mar-Oct
HYD	VOHS	Rajiv Gandhi International Airport	Hyderabad, Telangana, India	UTC+05:30	
HYF		Hayfields Airport	Hayfields, Papua New Guinea	UTC+10:00	
HYG	PAHY	Hydaburg Seaplane Base	Hydaburg, Alaska, United States	UTC−09:00	Mar-Nov
HYL		Hollis Clark Bay Seaplane Base	Hollis, Alaska, United States	UTC−09:00	Mar-Nov
HYN	ZSLQ	Taizhou Luqiao Airport	Taizhou, Zhejiang, China	UTC+08:00	
HYR	KHYR	Sawyer County Airport	Hayward, Wisconsin, United States	UTC−06:00	Mar-Nov
HYS	KHYS	Hays Regional Airport	Hays, Kansas, United States	UTC−06:00	Mar-Nov
HYV	EFHV	Hyvinkää Airfield	Hyvinkää, Finland	UTC+02:00	Mar-Oct
-HZ-
HZA	ZSHZ	Heze Mudan Airport	Heze, Shandong, China	UTC+08:00	
HZB	LFQT	Merville–Calonne Airport	Hazebrouck, Nord-Pas-de-Calais, France	UTC+01:00	Mar-Oct
HZG	ZLHZ	Hanzhong Chenggu Airport	Hanzhong, Shaanxi, China	UTC+08:00	
HZH	ZUNP	Liping Airport	Liping, Guizhou, China	UTC+08:00	
HZK	BIHU	Húsavík Airport	Húsavík, Iceland	UTC±00:00	
HZL	KHZL	Hazleton Municipal Airport	Hazleton, Pennsylvania, United States	UTC−05:00	Mar-Nov
HZP	CYNR	Fort MacKay/Horizon Airport	Fort McKay, Alberta, Canada	UTC−07:00	Mar-Nov
HZU		Chengdu Huaizhou Airport	Chengdu, Sichuan, China	UTC+08:00	
HZV	FAHW	Hazyview Airport	Hazyview, South Africa	UTC+02:00	
