= Hazen, New Hampshire =

Village in Whitefield, New Hampshire

Coordinates: 44°22′7″N 71°33′42″W

Hazen or Hazens is a small village and farming community in Whitefield, New Hampshire, United States. It was settled by Louis and Lucius Hazen in the 1870s. In 1887, the Grafton and Coos County Grange Fair came to the Hazen area.

== History ==
Hazen was first settled in 1870 by brothers Louis and Lucius Hazen. They settled in the Cherry Valley region and built themselves farmsteads. They owned registered Jersey cattle, and they began the process of clearing out the land to make room for crops and livestock. They eventually cleared out 6,000 acres (24 km^{2}) of land, which supported hay, corn, and wheat. By 1880, their farms had attracted more settlers, and the small village of Hazen had formed. Soon, a post office, railroad station, express office, blacksmith shop, school, and 15 homes stood in Hazen.

Soon, Louis Hazen became the farm's only owner, and he dammed the Johns River to create a small lake that not only gave the village drinking water, but also provided a recreational experience. The Jersey cattle herd grew larger, and soon, Louis built a racetrack and raised racehorses, and in 1887 they became fairgrounds. The Grafton and Coos County Grange Fair was soon held at Hazen village.

== Geography ==
Hazen is located in Whitefield, near Hazens Pond and Airport Marsh Reservoir. It is situated next to the Mount Washington Regional Airport, near the Jefferson town line. The primary road there is Hazen Road. The Hazen area today is a sparsely-populated part of the Whitefield-Jefferson border area.

== Notes ==
- Hazen is also spelled "Hazens".
- Hazen can be called a ghost town because it is near-abandoned and is much smaller than its grander historic past.
