= HGZ =

HGZ or Hgz may refer to:

- Hrvatski gardijski zdrug (1st Croatian Guards Brigade), unit of 1st Croatian Guards Corps
- Hrvatski glazbeni zavod, Croatian name for Croatian Music Institute
- Hgz, abbreviation for Hoogezand-Sappemeer railway station, Netherlands
- HGZ, IATA airport code for Hog River Airport, United States
