= HVE =

HVE or hve may refer to:

- Hanksville Airport (IATA: HVE), Utah, United States; see List of airports by IATA code: H
- Healesville railway station (station code: HVE), Victoria, Australia
- San Dionisio del Mar Huave language (ISO 639-3: hve), Oaxaca, Mexico
