= HDB =

HDB may refer to:

== Organizations ==
- Housing and Development Bank, an Egyptian bank
- Housing & Development Board, a statutory board of the Singaporean government
- HDB/Cram and Ferguson, an architectural firm in Boston

== Places ==
- Heidelberg railway station (rail station code: HDB), Heidelberg, Melbourne, Victoria, Australia
- Heidelberg Airport (ICAO airport code: EDIU; IATA code: HDB), Heidelberg, Germany
- HDB Hub, Singapore, Singapore

== Computing ==
- HDB3, a digital telecommunications code
- D-subminiature high density B-sized connector
  - HDB-15, a video connector
- /dev/hdb, a device file for accessing computer storage
- Altibase HDB, a database engine made by Altibase, called HDB

== Other uses ==
- The Himalayan Database, a Nepalese Himalayas data archive
- HDB, hot dog and bun, used in competitive eating contests such as Nathan's Hot Dog Eating Contest
