= HLW =

HLW may refer to:

- HLW International, an American architectural and engineering firm
- Hart Legacy Wrestling
- High-level waste
- Hillington West railway station, in Glasgow, Scotland
- Hluhluwe Airport, in KwaZulu-Natal, South Africa
