= Mountain View House =

- U.S. National Register of Historic Places
- U.S. Historic district
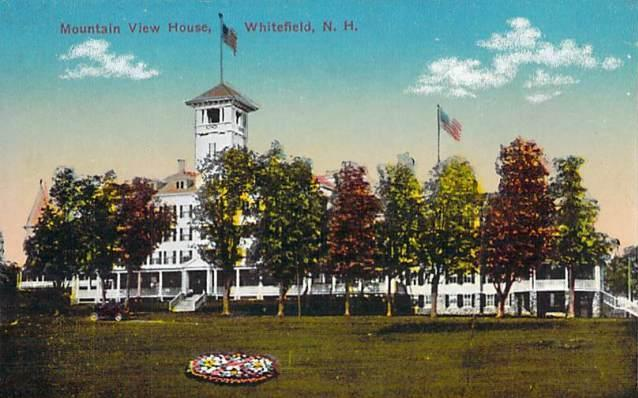
- Postcard of Mountain View House, c.1915

- Location within New Hampshire Location within the United States
- Location: 101 Mountain View Rd., Whitefield, New Hampshire
- Coordinates: 44.397886°N 71.588817°W
- Area: 24 acres (9.7 ha)
- Built: 1872, 1911-1912
- Architectural style: Colonial Revival
- NRHP reference No.: 04000588
- Added to NRHP: June 9, 2004

The Mountain View Grand Resort & Spa – formerly called the Mountain View House – is an historic grand hotel at 101 Mountain View Road in Whitefield, New Hampshire, United States, with claims to dating back to 1865.

It is listed on the National Register of Historic Places.

Mountain View Grand Resort & Spa is a member of Historic Hotels of America, the official program of the National Trust for Historic Preservation.

It reportedly grew from a farm, which added a guest house. In reference to that, the current resort includes a farm with chicken, sheep, goats, and Scottish Highland cattle.

It claims to have the oldest operating elevator in the state of New Hampshire.

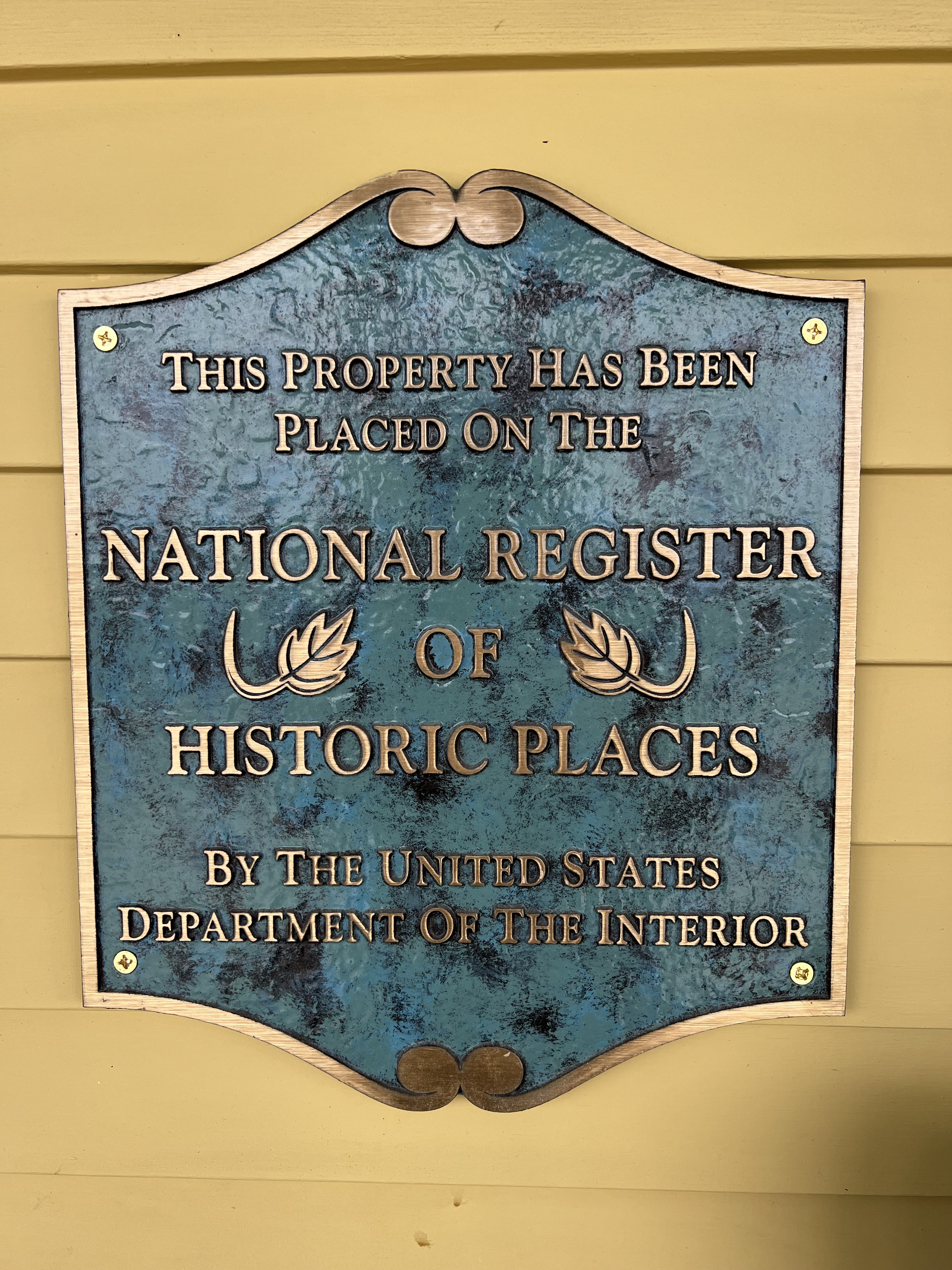
National Register of Historic Places marker

== History ==
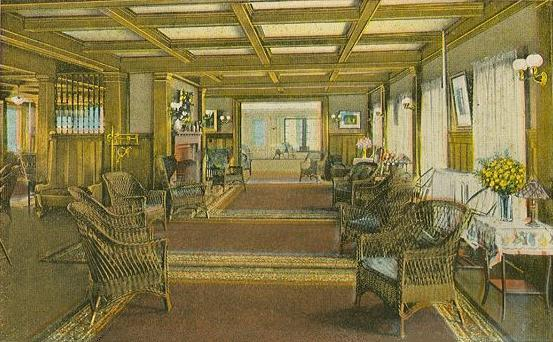
The lobby c. 1915

After the Civil War, tourism became popular in the White Mountains, especially with the arrival of the railroad. In 1865, William and Mary Dodge first accepted boarders into their home. By 1866, the couple officially opened an inn called the Mountain View House. Over the years, several additions were built, which by 1884 could accommodate over 100 guests. The facilities were greatly enlarged to accommodate over 200 guests in 1911 and 1912, when the iconic belvedere tower was added to the facade.

As an established member of the elite White Mountain resorts, the Dodges continued to expand and improve "The View", as it was called, including nearly doubling the hotel capacity to 300 beds and seating for 450 in the dining hall. Sports and conference facilities were added, and the real estate was expanded to over 3,000 acres (1,200 ha).

The property remained in the family until it was sold in 1979, giving rise to the claim of being "the oldest resort in the US to be owned and operate by the same family living on the same property."

But the new owners proved unsuccessful; it closed in 1986 after 122 seasons and went into foreclosure, with the furnishings auctioned by the bank in 1989.

== Redevelopment ==
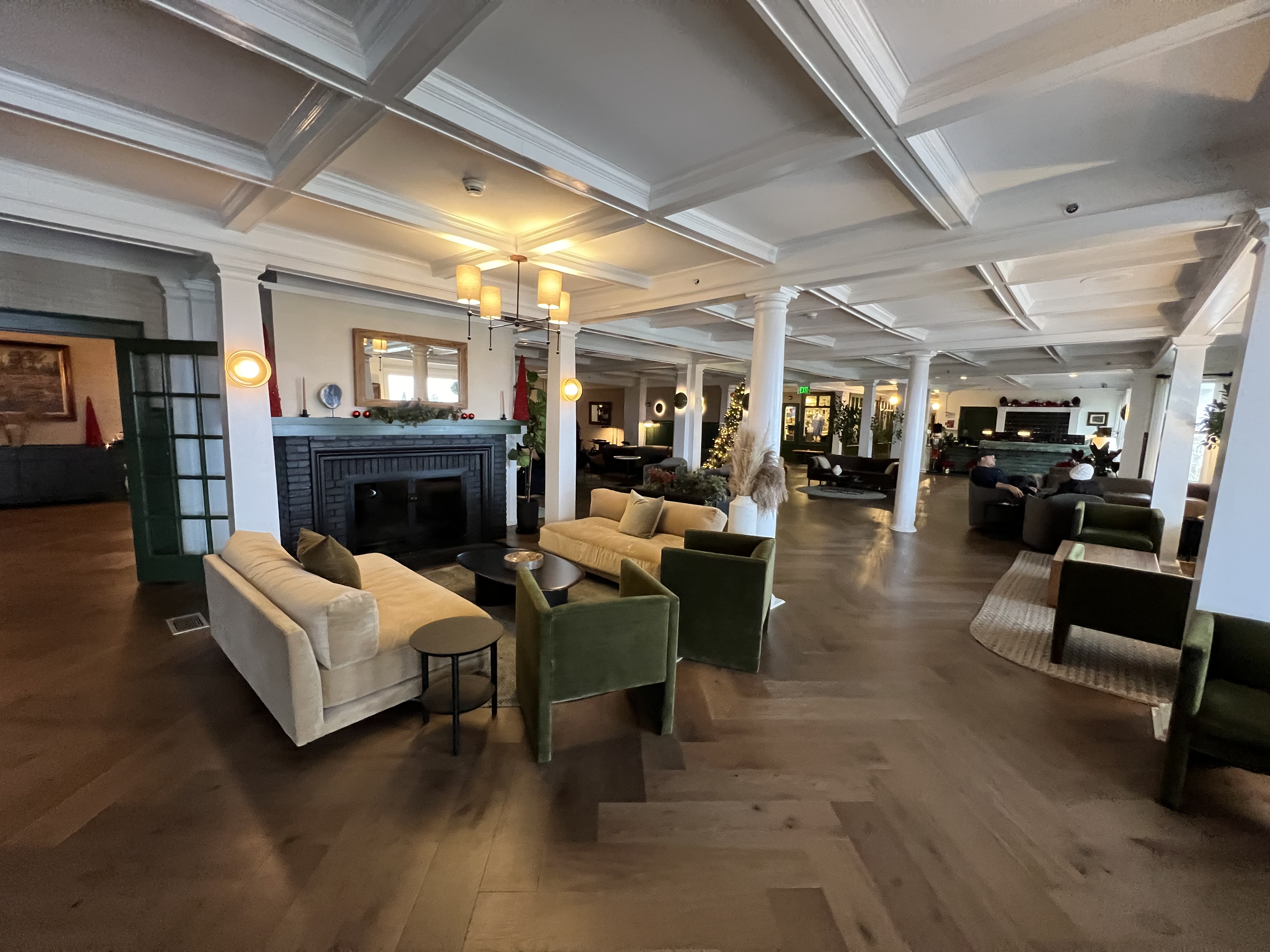
The lobby in 2023

After being held by investors, but never reopened as of 1998, Kevin Craffey, a general contractor from Duxbury, Massachusetts, purchased the vacant hotel for $1.3 million, including 360 acres (150 ha), a nine-hole golf course, clubhouse and conference hall. After an extensive $20 million renovation, with addition of a new hotel kitchen, spa, tennis courts, consolidation of 141 rooms, landscaping and updated amenities, the hotel reopened on May 22, 2002, as the Mountain View Grand Resort & Spa. In 2005, the hotel and its 4,000 surrounding acres were purchased by the American Financial Group, a holding company which owns several other historic luxury hotels in four other US states.

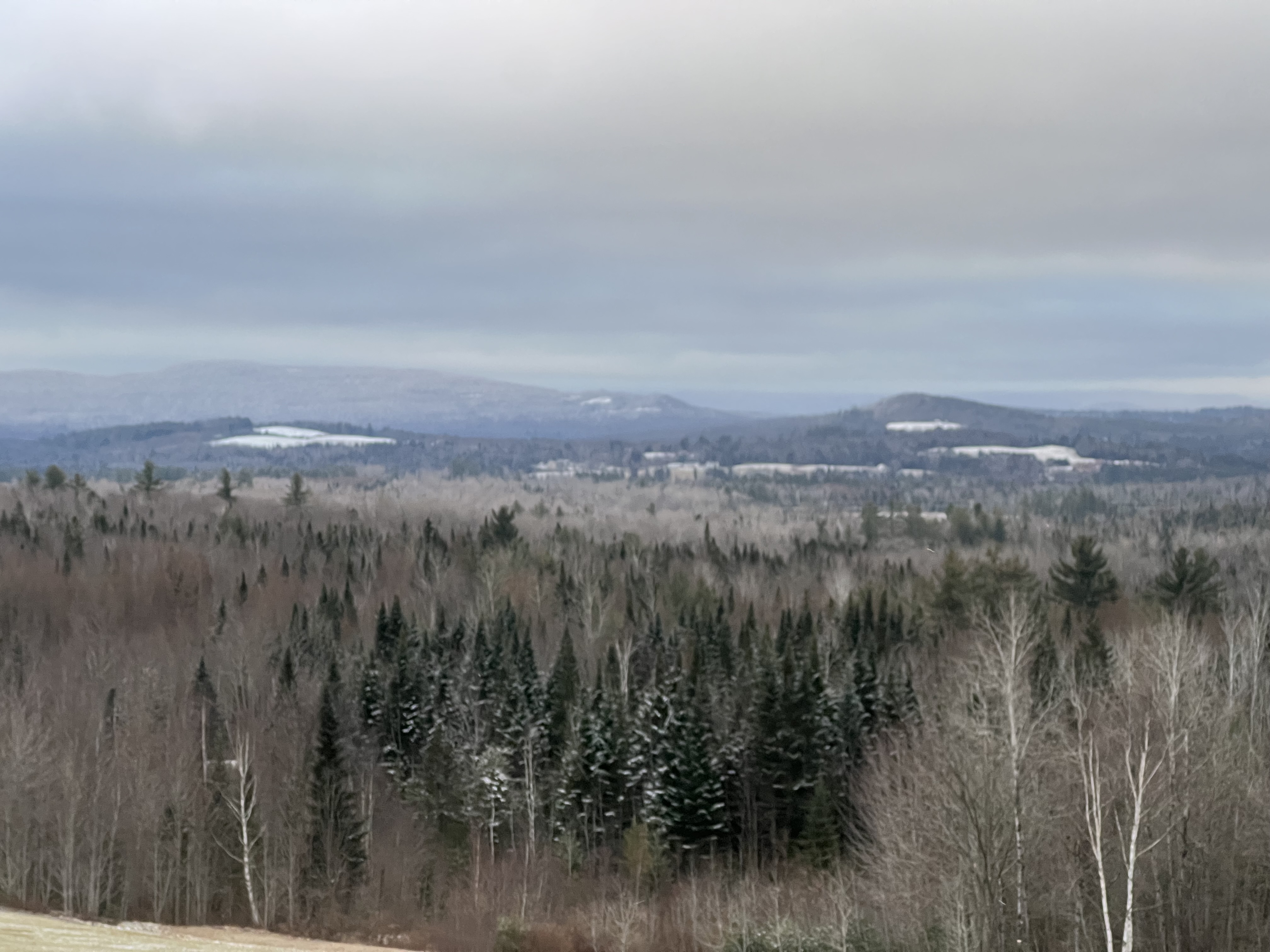
Mountains as seen from the hotel in December 2023

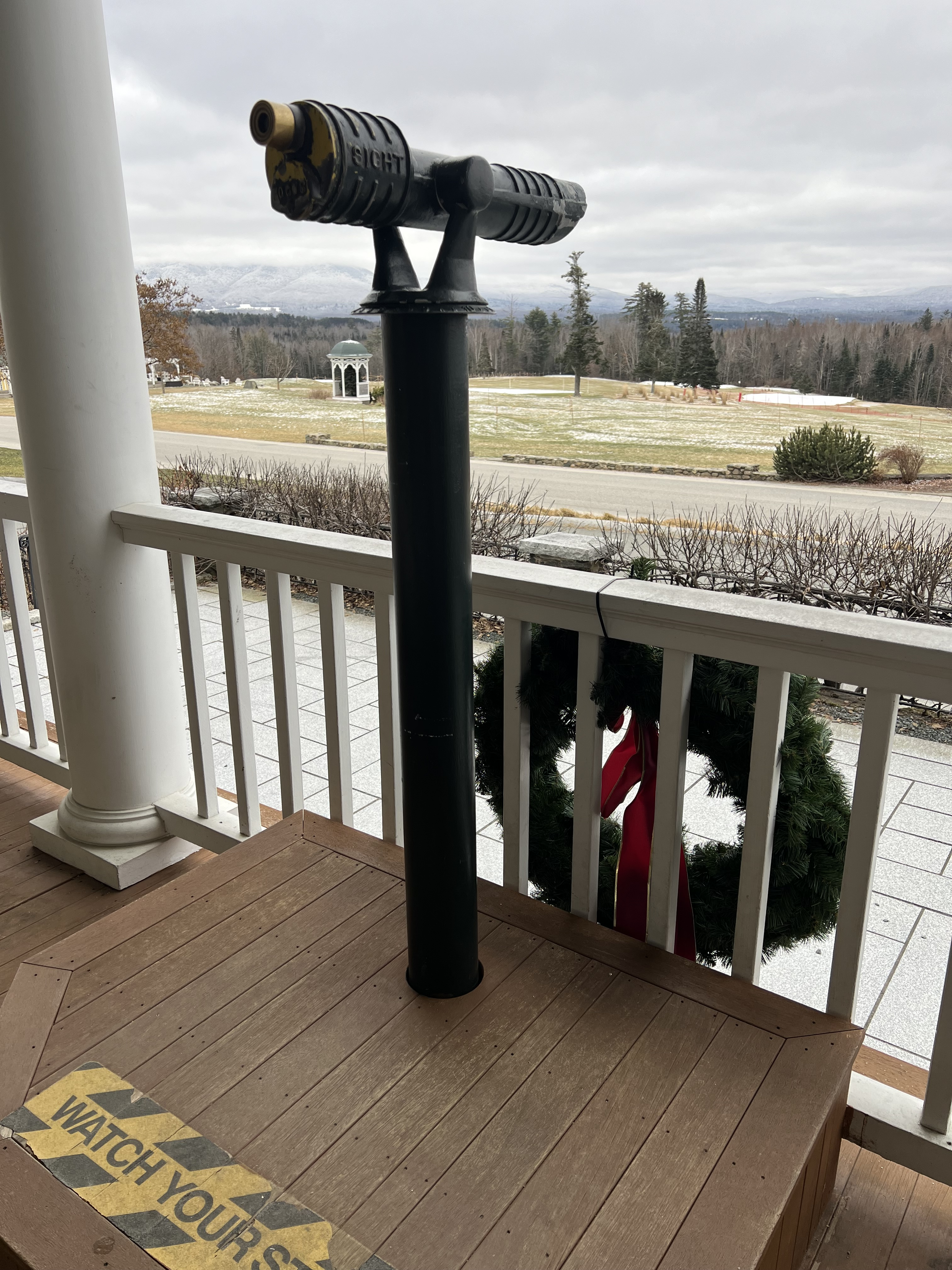
A telescope for mountain viewing

The Mountain View House was added to the National Register of Historic Places in 2004.

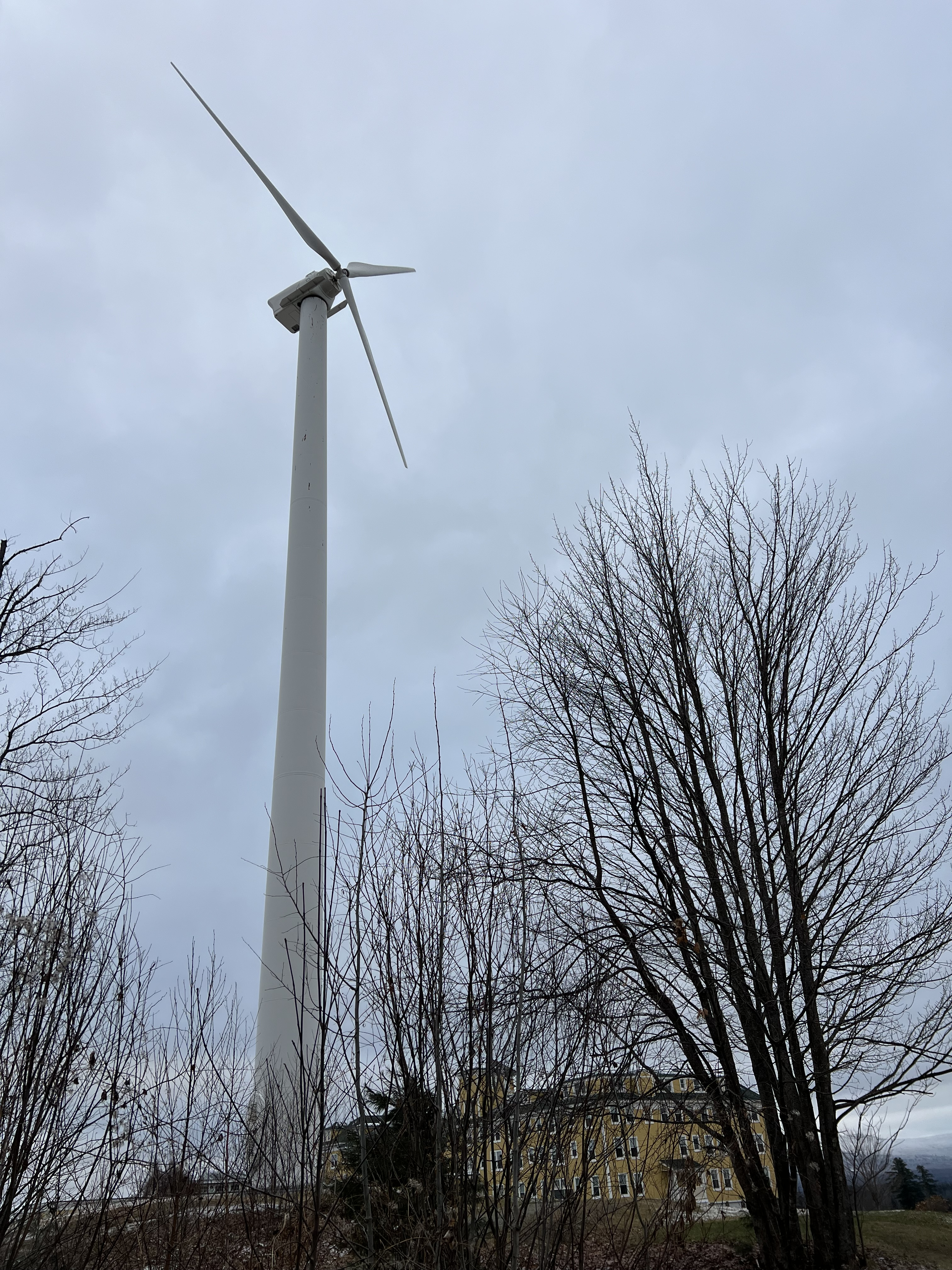
The wind turbine on the property

The Mountain View House is an EPA Green Power Partner, getting all of its electrical power through the installation of a 121-foot (37 m) wind turbine adjacent to the hotel and through the purchase of renewable energy certificates. The resort has been named an "Environmental Champion" by the New Hampshire Department of Environmental Services and the N.H. Lodging and Restaurant Association.

== Controversy ==
In 2004, a year after vehemently denying any wrongdoing, Mr. Craffey pleaded guilty to environmental felonies, arising from improper asbestos removal and disposal during renovations, and was sentenced to two years of detention, all but two months of which were suspended. He also agreed to pay over $230,000 in fines and restitution and 150 hours of community service.

Subcontractors on the renovation filed liens for $765,000 on the property, claiming they had not been paid.

== See also ==
- National Register of Historic Places listings in Coos County, New Hampshire
