= Qilian County =

Qilian County 祁连县 · མདོ་ལ་རྫོང་།
- County
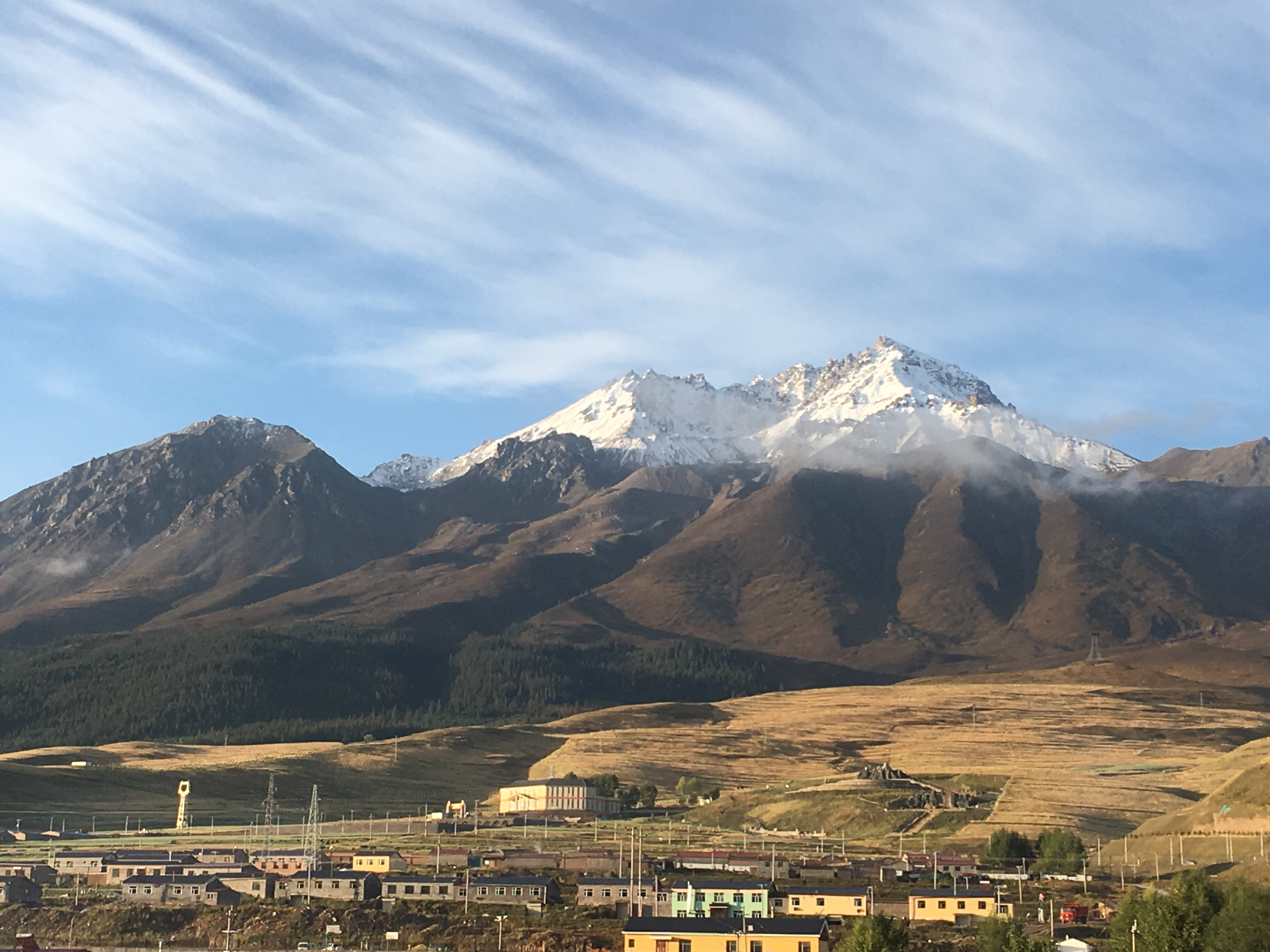
- Mount Niuxin of the Qilian Mountains in Qilian County

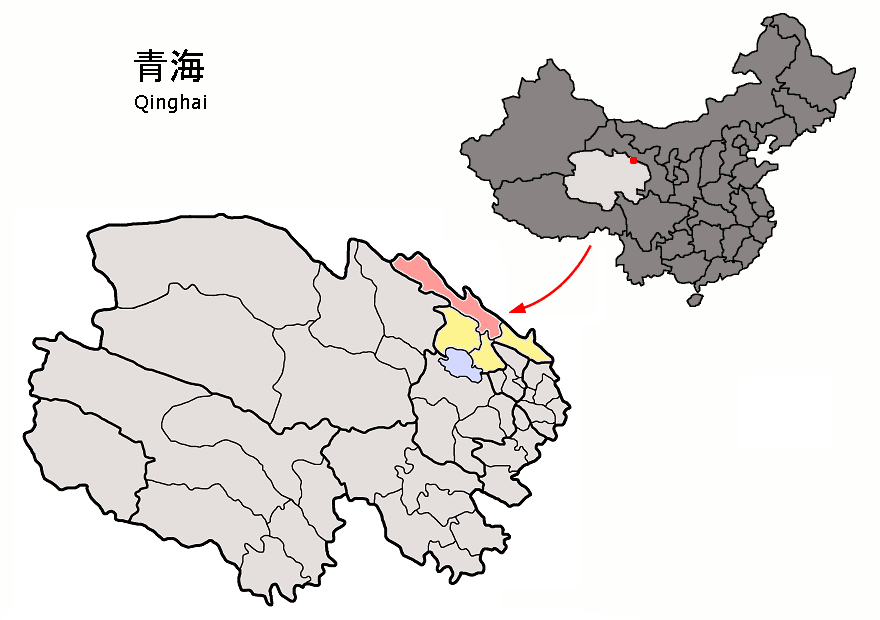
- Location of Qilian County (red) within Haibei Prefecture (yellow) and Qinghai

- Location in Qinghai Qilian County (China)
- Coordinates: 38°09′N 99°46′E
- Country: China
- Province: Qinghai
- Autonomous prefecture: Haibei
- County seat: Babao Town

Area
  - Total: 13,886 km^{2} (5,361 sq mi)

Population (2020)
  - Total: 48,538
  - Density: 3.4955/km^{2} (9.0532/sq mi)
- Time zone: UTC+8 (China Standard)
- Website: www.qilian.gov.cn

Qilian County

Chinese name
- Simplified Chinese: 祁连县
- Traditional Chinese: 祁連縣
Transcriptions
Standard Mandarin
- Hanyu Pinyin: Qílián Xiàn

Tibetan name
- Tibetan: མདོ་ལ་རྫོང་།
Transcriptions
- Wylie: mdo la rdzong
- Tibetan Pinyin: Dola Zong

Qilian County (Chinese: 祁连县, Tibetan: མདོ་ལ་རྫོང་།, Tibetan pronunciation: [to˩˨ la˥˥], Amdo Tibetan pronunciation: [mdo læ]), known as Dhola County in Tibetan, is a county of Haibei Tibetan Autonomous Prefecture, Qinghai Province, China. The Haibei Qilian Airport is located in the county.

== History ==
The history of human activity in the Qilian area can be traced back to the Han dynasty, more than 2,000 years ago. The Qilian County area was inhabited by the Qiang people in ancient times, and was adjacent to the territories of the Yuezhi during the Xia, Shang, Zhou, and Qin dynasties (circa 2200 B.C.-206 A.D.).

In the sixth year of the Han dynasty (201 AD), the Yuezhi was attacked and invaded by the Xiongnu and some of them moved to the Qilian Mountains.

In the year 121, Huo Qubing went and led his warriors to capture the Qilian Mountains, and the power of the Xiongnu and the Yuezhi was greatly reduced in the Qilian Mountains. From then on the Yuezhi in the Qilian Mountains and the Huangshui valley submitted to the Han dynasty. Since then, the Han Chinese have also settled in this area.

During the Eastern Han dynasty, the Lesser Yuezhi, who lived in the present-day Nongniugoudi area of Qilian County, developed into the "Lushuihu", and later, due to the influence of Han culture, they gradually integrated into the Han during the Northern Wei dynasty.

On October 1, 1949, the People's Republic of China was founded and the Chinese People's Liberation Army was stationed in the Babao area. Qilian was liberated and on September 13, 1951, the Qinghai Provincial People's Government changed Qilian County into a city under provincial jurisdiction. In 1952, the Qilian Autonomous Region People's Government was established, and in 1980, Qilian County was restored and placed under the jurisdiction of Haibei Tibetan Autonomous Prefecture.

== Geographical ==
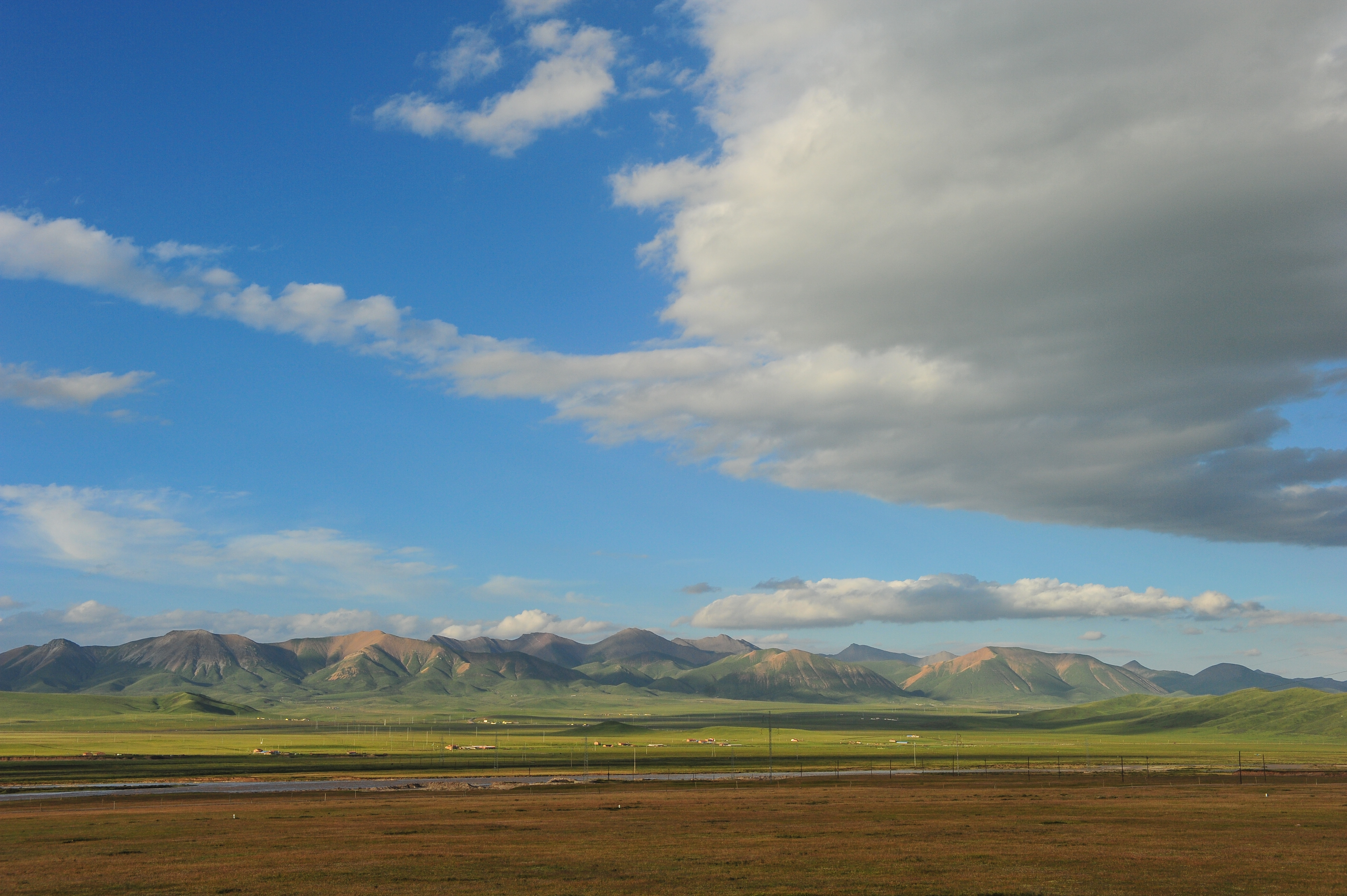
Qilian Mountains in Qilian, Qinghai

Qilian County covers an area of 15,700 square kilometers, accounting for 2.05% of the total area of Qinghai Province. Qilian County borders Menyuan Hui Autonomous County to the east, Gungca County and Haiyan County to the south, and Tianjun County to the southwest. To the north and northwest, it borders Jiuquan City, Sunan Yugur Autonomous County and Minle County in Gansu Province.

Qilian County contains a total of seven townships, which are Babao, Zhamashen, Yeniugou, Kekeli, Mole, Duolong, Ebao, and Aru. The town of Babao is the economic and political center of Qilian County.

Qilian County is named after its location in the Qilian Mountains, "Qilian" means "heavenly mountain" in the Xiongnu language, and in ancient times it was the place where the Qiang people gathered.

Qilian County is in the middle part of the Qilian Mountains. The average altitude is 3,169 m (10,397 ft), At the altitude of 4,000 m (13,000 ft) and above is the alpine zone with snow all year round.The elevation of the county seat is 2,787 m (9,144 ft).

The average year-round temperature in the county is 1 °C (34 °F), the climate type is highland climate, and the annual precipitation is about 270–600 mm (11–24 in). The climate is typical of an alpine climate. Due to its geographical location, Qilian County is subject to humid air currents from the southeast monsoon in the summer, and high pressure from Mongolia and dry and cold air currents from Siberia in the winter, resulting in large temperature differences and low temperatures.

The total number of rivers in the county is 247, including Mole River, Black River, Babao River and Tuole River, with a total annual runoff of 2.322 billion cubic meters.

== Climate ==
Climate data for Qilian, elevation 2,787 m (9,144 ft), (1991–2020 normals, extremes 1991–present)
Month	Jan	Feb	Mar	Apr	May	Jun	Jul	Aug	Sep	Oct	Nov	Dec	Year
Record high °C (°F)	11.8 (53.2)	16.5 (61.7)	22.3 (72.1)	27.4 (81.3)	27.2 (81.0)	28.5 (83.3)	33.4 (92.1)	31.8 (89.2)	28.4 (83.1)	22.2 (72.0)	16.6 (61.9)	9.0 (48.2)	33.4 (92.1)
Mean daily maximum °C (°F)	−2.4 (27.7)	2.0 (35.6)	7.0 (44.6)	12.5 (54.5)	16.2 (61.2)	19.5 (67.1)	21.7 (71.1)	20.9 (69.6)	17.1 (62.8)	11.5 (52.7)	4.9 (40.8)	−1.3 (29.7)	10.8 (51.5)
Daily mean °C (°F)	−12.4 (9.7)	−8.2 (17.2)	−2.6 (27.3)	3.7 (38.7)	8.0 (46.4)	11.8 (53.2)	13.9 (57.0)	12.9 (55.2)	8.7 (47.7)	2.2 (36.0)	−5.2 (22.6)	−11.3 (11.7)	1.8 (35.2)
Mean daily minimum °C (°F)	−19.7 (−3.5)	−16.0 (3.2)	−10.0 (14.0)	−3.4 (25.9)	1.2 (34.2)	5.3 (41.5)	7.7 (45.9)	6.8 (44.2)	2.9 (37.2)	−4.2 (24.4)	−12.2 (10.0)	−18.3 (−0.9)	−5.0 (23.0)
Record low °C (°F)	−28.9 (−20.0)	−27.1 (−16.8)	−23.0 (−9.4)	−15.2 (4.6)	−10.1 (13.8)	−3.2 (26.2)	1.0 (33.8)	−2.2 (28.0)	−7.3 (18.9)	−13.9 (7.0)	−24.9 (−12.8)	−32.0 (−25.6)	−32.0 (−25.6)
Average precipitation mm (inches)	1.3 (0.05)	1.4 (0.06)	7.3 (0.29)	17.2 (0.68)	51.0 (2.01)	72.2 (2.84)	100.0 (3.94)	96.3 (3.79)	66.7 (2.63)	15.2 (0.60)	2.3 (0.09)	0.4 (0.02)	431.3 (17)
Average precipitation days (≥ 0.1 mm)	2.2	2.8	6.4	7.8	13.3	17.2	18.3	18.4	14.8	7.1	2.0	0.7	111
Average snowy days	3.4	4.8	9.5	9.1	5.0	0.3	0	0.1	0.8	6.0	3.2	2.0	44.2
Average relative humidity (%)	45	42	44	47	53	59	64	67	65	57	48	47	53
Mean monthly sunshine hours	218.9	208.0	235.9	246.2	254.7	238.8	241.4	236.8	220.5	245.4	232.2	220.0	2,798.8
Percentage possible sunshine	71	68	63	62	58	54	54	57	60	72	78	75	64
Source: China Meteorological Administration

Climate data for Tuolei, Qilian, elevation 3,367 m (11,047 ft), (1991–2020 normals)
Month	Jan	Feb	Mar	Apr	May	Jun	Jul	Aug	Sep	Oct	Nov	Dec	Year
Mean daily maximum °C (°F)	−5.9 (21.4)	−1.7 (28.9)	3.2 (37.8)	8.9 (48.0)	12.5 (54.5)	16.1 (61.0)	18.5 (65.3)	18.1 (64.6)	14.2 (57.6)	7.7 (45.9)	0.8 (33.4)	−4.7 (23.5)	7.3 (45.2)
Daily mean °C (°F)	−16.8 (1.8)	−12.2 (10.0)	−6.6 (20.1)	0.0 (32.0)	4.7 (40.5)	8.9 (48.0)	11.4 (52.5)	10.6 (51.1)	5.7 (42.3)	−1.8 (28.8)	−9.6 (14.7)	−15.6 (3.9)	−1.8 (28.8)
Mean daily minimum °C (°F)	−25.4 (−13.7)	−21.3 (−6.3)	−15.2 (4.6)	−7.9 (17.8)	−2.6 (27.3)	2.2 (36.0)	5.2 (41.4)	4.2 (39.6)	−0.9 (30.4)	−9.0 (15.8)	−17.4 (0.7)	−23.7 (−10.7)	−9.3 (15.2)
Average precipitation mm (inches)	1.4 (0.06)	1.2 (0.05)	3.2 (0.13)	8.9 (0.35)	36.9 (1.45)	66.4 (2.61)	93.3 (3.67)	66.5 (2.62)	34.2 (1.35)	8.5 (0.33)	1.4 (0.06)	0.7 (0.03)	322.6 (12.71)
Average precipitation days (≥ 0.1 mm)	2.3	1.7	3.7	5.8	10.0	15.0	17.4	14.8	9.8	4.0	1.8	1.0	87.3
Average snowy days	3.1	2.8	5.0	7.9	9.4	2.8	0.5	0.5	2.8	5.1	2.4	1.5	43.8
Average relative humidity (%)	45	40	40	44	51	59	64	64	62	53	49	46	51
Mean monthly sunshine hours	225.4	214.4	248.0	262.4	276.6	257.4	256.5	256.8	247.8	263.9	236.2	223.4	2,968.8
Percentage possible sunshine	74	70	66	66	62	58	57	62	67	77	79	77	68
Source: China Meteorological Administration

Climate data for Yeniugou, Qilian, elevation 3,314 m (10,873 ft), (1991–2020 normals)
Month	Jan	Feb	Mar	Apr	May	Jun	Jul	Aug	Sep	Oct	Nov	Dec	Year
Mean daily maximum °C (°F)	−5.1 (22.8)	−1.3 (29.7)	3.3 (37.9)	8.5 (47.3)	11.8 (53.2)	15.1 (59.2)	17.4 (63.3)	16.9 (62.4)	13.3 (55.9)	7.4 (45.3)	1.2 (34.2)	−3.7 (25.3)	7.1 (44.7)
Daily mean °C (°F)	−16.3 (2.7)	−12.4 (9.7)	−6.9 (19.6)	−0.7 (30.7)	3.7 (38.7)	7.7 (45.9)	10.2 (50.4)	9.3 (48.7)	5.1 (41.2)	−2.0 (28.4)	−9.8 (14.4)	−15.3 (4.5)	−2.3 (27.9)
Mean daily minimum °C (°F)	−24.8 (−12.6)	−21.6 (−6.9)	−15.4 (4.3)	−8.1 (17.4)	−2.9 (26.8)	1.4 (34.5)	4.2 (39.6)	3.5 (38.3)	−0.6 (30.9)	−8.7 (16.3)	−17.7 (0.1)	−23.4 (−10.1)	−9.5 (14.9)
Average precipitation mm (inches)	1.9 (0.07)	2.8 (0.11)	9.0 (0.35)	16.9 (0.67)	44.7 (1.76)	74.5 (2.93)	114.8 (4.52)	98.4 (3.87)	59.8 (2.35)	15.5 (0.61)	2.9 (0.11)	0.8 (0.03)	442 (17.38)
Average precipitation days (≥ 0.1 mm)	3.2	3.9	7.5	9.1	14.3	17.5	20.4	19.5	14.8	7.0	3.0	1.7	121.9
Average snowy days	4.6	5.8	10.0	11.5	12.4	2.8	0.8	0.7	5.1	8.6	3.9	2.3	68.5
Average relative humidity (%)	50	47	48	52	59	66	71	73	71	63	54	50	59
Mean monthly sunshine hours	209.1	206.4	229.9	238.4	239.4	216.6	218.8	220.2	203.4	240.2	222.8	207.4	2,652.6
Percentage possible sunshine	68	67	62	60	54	49	49	53	55	71	75	71	61
Source: China Meteorological Administration

== Administrative divisions ==
Qilian County is made up of 3 towns and 4 townships:

Name	Simplified Chinese	Hanyu Pinyin	Tibetan	Wylie	Administrative division code
Towns
Babao Town (Zünmoxong Town)	八宝镇	Bābǎo Zhèn	བཙུན་མོ་གཞོང་གྲོང་རྡལ།	btsun mo gzhong grong rdal	632222100
Obo Town (Karmar Town, Ebao Town)	峨堡镇	Ébǎo Zhèn	མཁར་དམར་གྲོང་རྡལ།	mkhar dmar grong rdal	632222101
Muri Town (Mole Town)	默勒镇	Mòlè Zhèn	མུ་རི་གྲོང་རྡལ།	mu ri grong rdal	632222102
Townships
Zhamashi Township (Zamar Township)	扎麻什乡	Zhāmáshí Xiāng	རྫ་དམར་ཞང་།	rdza dmar zhang	632222200
Arig Township (Arou Township, or Aruk Township)	阿柔乡	Āróu Xiāng	ཨ་རིག་ཞང་།	a rig zhang	632222201
Yeniugou Township (Zhonglung Township, or Dronglong Village)	野牛沟乡	Yěniúgōu Xiāng	འབྲོང་ལུང་ཞང་།	'brong lung zhang	632222202
Yanglung Township (Yanglong Township)	央隆乡	Yānglóng Xiāng	གཡང་ལུང་ཡུལ་ཚོ།	g.yang lung yul tsho	632222203

== Population ==
Chorten in Qilian County

Qilian County has a total population of 43,700 people. Qilian County is inhabited by about 15 ethnic groups, including Tibetans, Hui, Han, Monguor, Gaoshan people, Zhuang and Koreans. The main religions in the Qilian area are Tibetan Buddhism and Islam. Tibetans are mainly concentrated in Arou, Ebao, Yeniugou, and Kekeli, Mongolians mainly live in Mole and Duolong, and the Hui are concentrated in Babao, the county seat.

== Fauna ==
There are more than 20 species of wild animals found in Qilian County. According to statistics, there are about 20,000 of them, mainly classified as rare and protected animals, ornamental animals, meat animals, and fur animals.

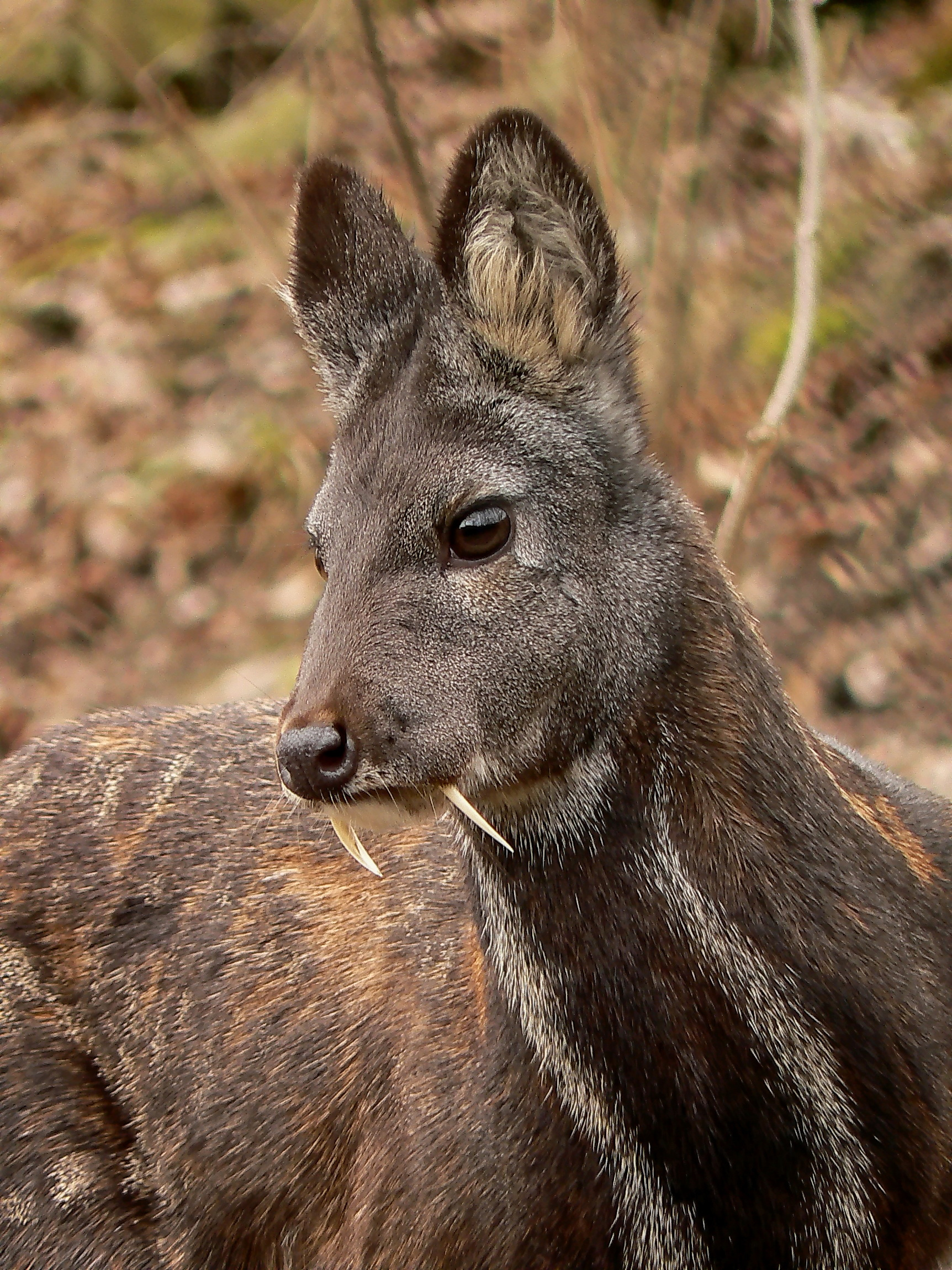
Moschus

Moschus	A mammal of the deer family; secretes musk. Moschus does not live in herds. It is a herbivore that feeds on moss, weeds, or grasses.
Gymnocypris chilianensis	A cold-water freshwater fish. Produced in the Mole River, Babao River, and Black River. Feed on aquatic insects.
Pseudois nayaur	A phytophagous mountain mammal, belonging to the bovine family. Good at jumping and quick to move. Its meat is edible.
Ovis ammon	Brownish-gray in color, with powerful limbs, it is found in the foothills of the highlands. It migrates seasonally, living and feeding in the grasslands and valleys in winter, and inhabiting the mountains in summer.
Grus nigricollis	A large wading bird with silvery gray plumage, it is one of the most recently discovered cranes in the world and is a protected species. It eats fish and shrimp in the water.
Aquila rapax nipalensis	A fierce predatory bird that preys on small animals and birds; active during the day. It inhabits plains and mountain forests.

=== Qilian Deer Farm ===
Qilian Deer Farm is the largest semi-wild deer breeding base in Asia. Qilian Deer Farm covers an area of about 60,000 acres, with an average altitude of 3,500 meters. Qilian Deer Farm is located in the Oil Gourd Wildlife Nature Reserve, 40 kilometers from the county seat. It is a local tourist attraction. The farm was established in 1958. At the beginning, the deer farm kept only red deer and white-lipped deer. In 1964 the sika deer was introduced.

== Natural resources ==
There are 41 kinds of mineral resources in Qilian County, among which the main minerals are coal, asbestos, alluvial gold, etc.

There are 369 species of plants in Qilian County, including those with medicinal value, such as Saussurea involucrata, cordyceps, rhubarb, Bupleurum, and Astragalus.

Altitude (m)	Species
2769–2849	Hordeum vulgare, Brassicaca campestris, Stipa purpurea, Carex myosuroides, Descurainia sophia, Ranunculus tanguticus, Dracocephalum heterophyllum, Pedicularis verticillata, Taraxacum species, Gueldenstaedtia species, Medicago species.
2931–3009	Agropyron cristatum, Poa annua, Dracocephalum heterophyllum, Ajuga lupulina, Ranunculus tanguticus, Juniperus przewalskii, Picea crassifolia, Taraxacum mongolicum, Agropyron cristatum.
3062–3168	Dasiphora fruticosa, Myricaria paniculata, Bistorta vivipara, Bistorta macrophylla, Urtica hyperborea.
3435–3889	Urtica hyperborea, Bistorta macrophylla, Bistorta vivipara, Myricaria paniculata, Salix cupularis, Dasiphora fruticosa, Sibiraea angustata, Caragana jubata, Oxytropis species.

== See also ==
- List of administrative divisions of Qinghai
