= Johns River (New Hampshire) =

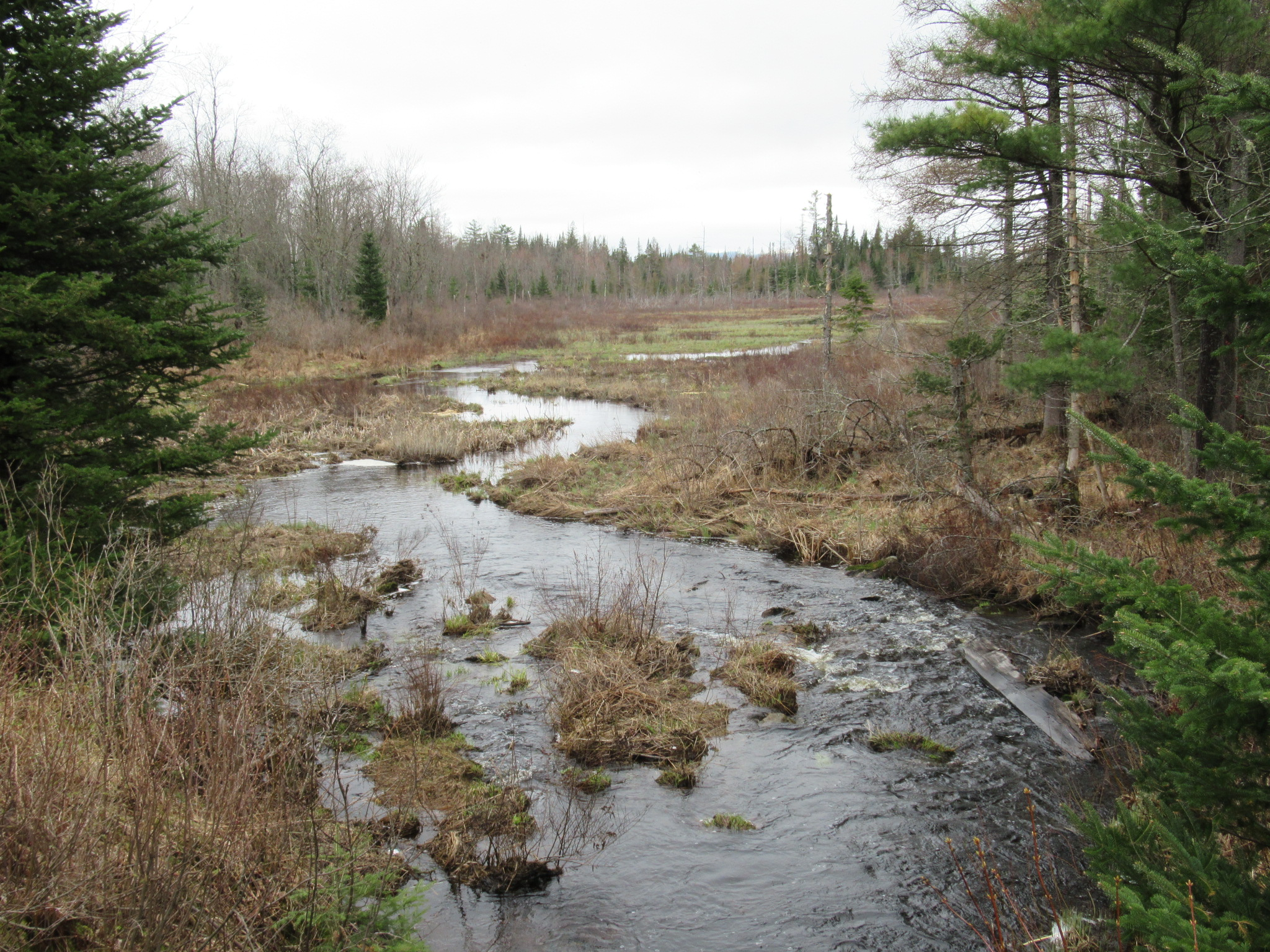
- The Johns River downstream from its source at Cherry Pond

- Location within New Hampshire Location within the United States

Location
- Country: United States
- State: New Hampshire
- County: Coos
- Towns: Jefferson, Whitefield, Dalton

Physical characteristics
- Source: Cherry Pond
  - location: Jefferson
  - coordinates: 44°22′26″N 71°31′8″W
  - elevation: 1,109 ft (338 m)
- Mouth: Connecticut River
  - location: Dalton
  - coordinates: 44°25′35″N 71°40′34″W
  - elevation: 837 ft (255 m)
- Length: 14 mi (23 km)

Basin features
- Tributaries
  - left: Ayling Brook, Carroll Stream, Bog Brook, Chase Brook

The Johns River (also called "John's River"), in northern New Hampshire, arises at Cherry Pond in Jefferson and runs approximately 14 miles (23 km), generally northwest, to the Connecticut River. It passes through Hazens Pond, near the Mount Washington Regional Airport, traverses the town of Whitefield, where it is crossed by U.S. Route 3, and then crosses the town of Dalton before joining the Connecticut. It is named for an early hunter and trapper of the area, John Glines, who established a fishing and hunting camp in the area in the 18th century. Another nearby river, the Israel River, is named for John's brother Israel.

The river basin drains numerous small ponds, including Martin Meadow Pond, Weeks Pond, Weed Pond, Clark Pond, Burns Pond (formerly Long Pond), Richardson Pond/Marsh, Hazens Pond, Cherry and Little Cherry Pond, Forest Lake and Mirror Lake (formerly Blake Pond). Tributaries include Chase Brook, Carroll Stream, Bear Brook, Leonard Brook, Cherry Mountain Brook, Carter Brook and Bog Brook. The watershed area is bounded by the eastern slope of the Dalton Mountain Range, the southern slope of Prospect Mountain and the western slope of Cherry Mountain (also called Mount Martha).

== See also ==
- List of rivers of New Hampshire
