= Dalton, New Hampshire =

- Town
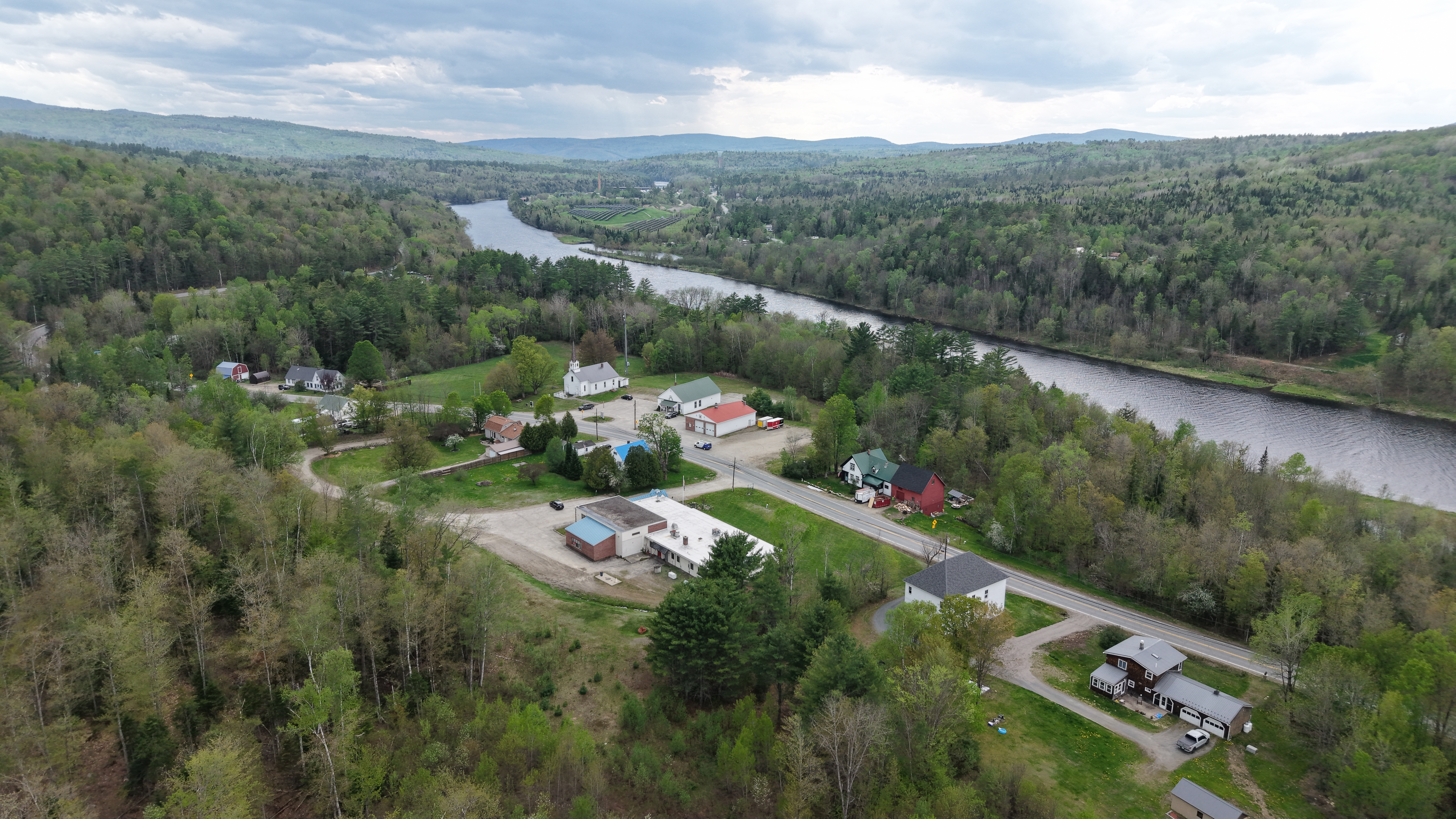
- Dalton, NH, from the northeast

- Seal

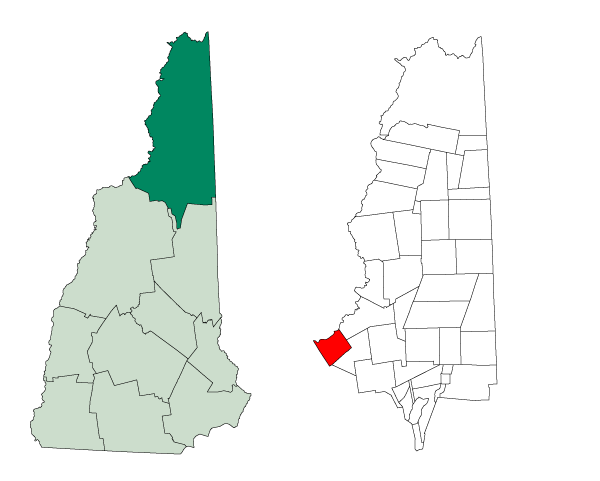
- Location in Coös County, New Hampshire
- Coordinates: 44°23′15″N 71°40′55″W
- Country: United States
- State: New Hampshire
- County: Coös
- Incorporated: 1764
- Villages: Dalton; Cushman

Area
  - Total: 28.1 sq mi (72.7 km^{2})
  - Land: 27.5 sq mi (71.3 km^{2})
  - Water: 0.54 sq mi (1.4 km^{2}) 1.97%
- Elevation: 1,650 ft (500 m)

Population (2020)
  - Total: 933
  - Density: 34/sq mi (13.1/km^{2})
- Time zone: UTC-5 (Eastern)
  - Summer (DST): UTC-4 (Eastern)
- ZIP code: 03598
- Area code: 603
- FIPS code: 33-16820
- GNIS feature ID: 873573
- Website: townofdaltonnh.gov

Dalton is a town in Coös County, New Hampshire, United States. The population was 933 at the 2020 census, and an estimated 907 in 2025. It is part of the Berlin, NH-VT Micropolitan Statistical Area.

== History ==
On November 17, 1764, Benning Wentworth, the royal governor of the Province of New Hampshire, granted the commission of a new township "Chiswick", named for the Duke of Devonshire's castle. The name was changed to "Apthorp" in 1770, after the Apthorp family. At the same time a change in the town of Lancaster's boundaries left about 10,000 acres (4,000 ha) near the Johns River outside the town. In 1770, the township of Apthorp was chartered, incorporating most of the old Chiswick grant along with these 10,000 acres, extending roughly from Cherry Pond in present-day Jefferson to the Connecticut River. In 1784 Apthorp was divided into two towns, Littleton and Dalton.

The name "Dalton" was chosen in honor of Tristram Dalton, merchant and senator from Massachusetts.

== Geography ==
According to the United States Census Bureau, the town has a total area of 28.1 square miles (72.7 km^{2}), of which 27.5 square miles (71.3 km^{2}) are land and 0.5 square miles (1.4 km^{2}) are water, comprising 1.97% of the town. The town's highest point is the summit of Dalton Mountain, at 2,150 feet (660 m) above sea level. The town includes the hamlet of Cushman, located on the Connecticut River opposite Gilman, Vermont. Dalton lies fully within the Connecticut River watershed.

Approximately 82% of the town's land—14,458 acres (58.5 km^{2}) out of a total land area of 17,624 acres (71.3 km^{2})—is undeveloped farm land, forest land or unproductive land enrolled in the state's current use program. The land enrolled in current use is owned by 216 property owners, resulting in an average parcel size of 66.94 acres (270,900 m^{2}) per current use owner. According to the town's property ownership records, the town's largest landowner, together with family members, owns in excess of 1,800 acres (7.3 km^{2}) of land.

== Demographics ==
Historical population
Census	Pop.	Note	%±
1790	14		—
1800	62		342.9%
1810	235		279.0%
1820	347		47.7%
1830	532		53.3%
1840	664		24.8%
1850	751		13.1%
1860	666		−11.3%
1870	773		16.1%
1880	570		−26.3%
1890	596		4.6%
1900	592		−0.7%
1910	475		−19.8%
1920	460		−3.2%
1930	580		26.1%
1940	642		10.7%
1950	557		−13.2%
1960	567		1.8%
1970	425		−25.0%
1980	672		58.1%
1990	827		23.1%
2000	927		12.1%
2010	979		5.6%
2020	933		−4.7%
U.S. Decennial Census

As of the census of 2000, there were 927 people, 374 households, and 253 families living in the town. The population density was 33.7 people per square mile (13.0 people/km^{2}). There were 520 housing units at an average density of 18.9 per square mile (7.3/km^{2}). The racial makeup of the town was 96.76% White, 0.76% African American, 0.54% Native American, 0.22% Asian, 0.22% from other races, and 1.51% from two or more races. Hispanic or Latino of any race were 1.94% of the population.

There were 374 households, out of which 28.9% had children under the age of 18 living with them, 56.1% were married couples living together, 6.7% had a female householder with no husband present, and 32.1% were non-families. 24.1% of all households were made up of individuals, and 13.4% had someone living alone who was 65 years of age or older. The average household size was 2.48 and the average family size was 2.95.

In the town, the population was spread out, with 24.4% under the age of 18, 6.5% from 18 to 24, 27.2% from 25 to 44, 27.4% from 45 to 64, and 14.6% who were 65 years of age or older. The median age was 41 years. For every 100 females, there were 106.0 males. For every 100 females age 18 and over, there were 104.4 males.

The median income for a household in the town was $35,625, and the median income for a family was $41,667. Males had a median income of $29,097 versus $20,089 for females. The per capita income for the town was $16,234. About 2.7% of families and 5.6% of the population were below the poverty line, including 6.3% of those under age 18 and 10.8% of those age 65 or over.

== Adjacent municipalities ==
- Lancaster (northeast)
- Whitefield (east)
- Bethlehem (south)
- Littleton (southwest)
- Concord, Vermont (west)
- Lunenburg, Vermont (northwest)
