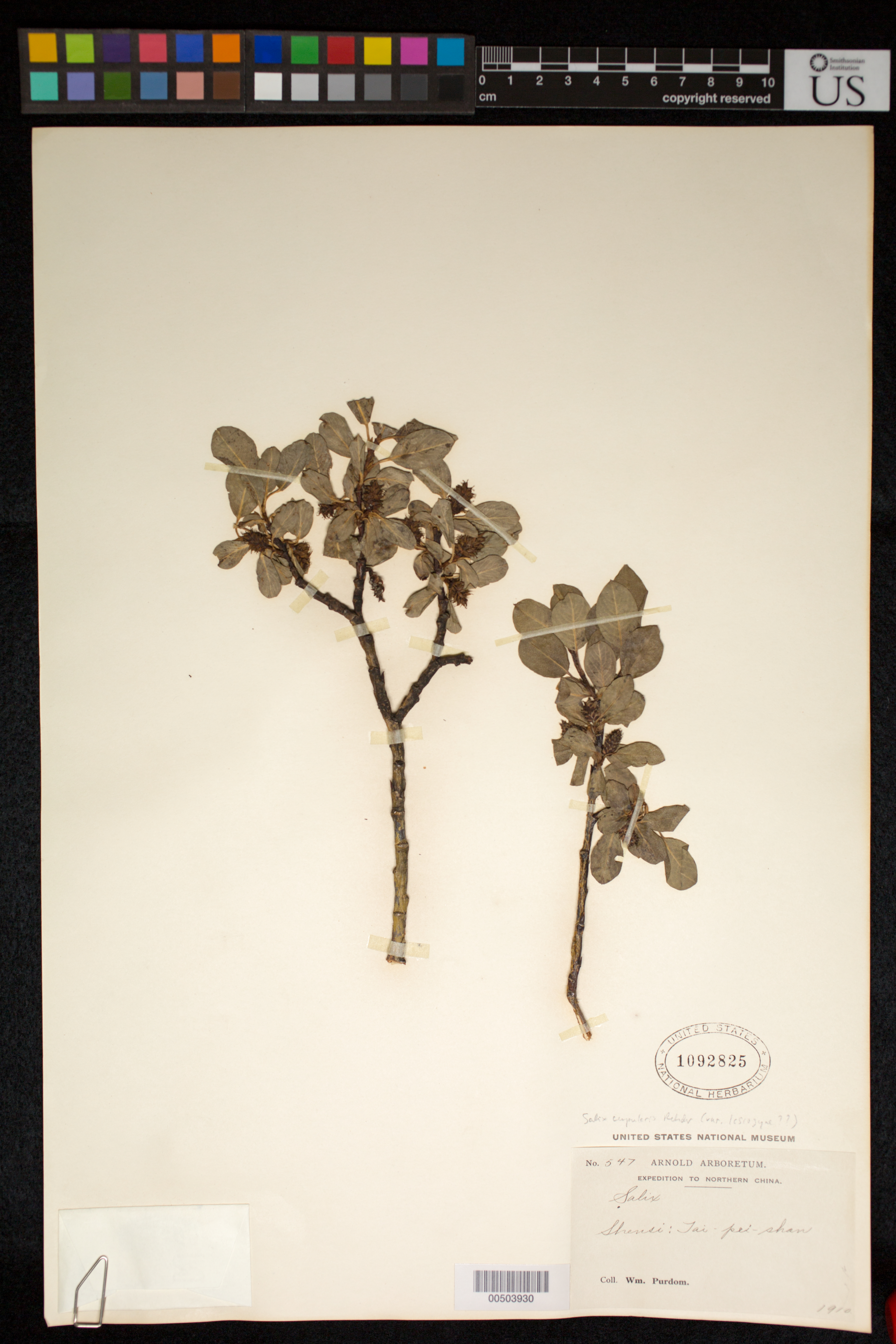

Scientific classification
- Kingdom: Plantae
- Clade: Tracheophytes
- Clade: Angiosperms
- Clade: Eudicots
- Clade: Rosids
- Order: Malpighiales
- Family: Salicaceae
- Genus: Salix
- Species: S. cupularis

Binomial name
- Salix cupularis Rehder (1923)

= Salix cupularis =

Shrub in the genus of willows

Salix cupularis is a small shrub from the willow genus (Salix) with leaves 1.5 to 2.7 centimeters long. It is native to northwestern China.

== Description ==
Salix cupularis is a small shrub. The branches are initially reddish-brown or black-purple and later gray and have clearly developed nodes. The buds are brown-red, shiny, narrowly elongated, and about 4 millimeters long. The leaves have roundish stipules about 5 millimeters. The petiole is yellowish, and about a third to a half times as long as the leaf blade. The leaf blade is elliptical or obovate-elliptical, rarely rounded, 1.5 to 2.7 centimeters long and 1 to 1.5 centimeters wide, entire, with a rounded or broad wedge-shaped base and a more or less rounded and acuminate or long pointed end. The upper side of the leaf is dull green and bare, the underside greenish. Six to nine pairs of side veins are formed.

The male inflorescences are catkins about 2 centimeters long. The peduncle is short and has three leaflets. The bracts are obovate, about half as long as the stamens, downy or hairless on the underside of the leaf towards the tip. They have a rounded tip. Male flowers have adaxially and abaxially narrowly ovate-petiolate nectar glands connected at the base. They have two stamens. The stamens are hairy at the base. Female catkins are elliptical to short cylindrical, about 1 centimeter long, and petiolate. The bracts are ovate to broadly ovate, 1.5 to 2 millimeters long and have a rounded tip. Female flowers have an adaxial and a somewhat smaller abaxial nectar gland. The adaxial gland is divided into two or three parts, the base of the gland is fused and thus resembles a disc. The ovary is long ovate, hairless, and short stalked. The stylus is about 1 millimeter long, the stigma has two columns. The capsule fruits are about 3 millimeters long when ripe. Salix cupularis flowers in June with the leaf shoots or a little later, the fruits ripen in July and August.

== Range ==
The natural range is in the northwest of the Chinese provinces of Gansu, Qinghai, Shaanxi, Sichuan, and in Inner Mongolia. Salix cupularis grows on mountain slopes at elevations of 2500 to 4000 meters.

== Taxonomy ==
Salix cupularis is in the section Sclerophyllae of the willow family (Salicaceae). It was described scientifically for the first time in 1923 by Alfred Rehder in Arnoldia, the Journal of the Arnold Arboretum. No synonyms are known. The genus name Salix is the classical Latin name for various willow species.

There are two varieties:

- Salix cupularis var. cupularis: the tip of the leaf is more or less rounded and pointed, male catkins are about 1 centimeter long. The distribution area is in the Chinese provinces of Gansu, Qinghai, Shaanxi, Sichuan on mountain slopes at elevations of 2500 to 4000 meters.
- Salix cupularis var. acutifolia S. Q. Zhou: The tip of the leaf is long, pointed, male catkins are up to 2 centimeters long. The distribution area is in Inner Mongolia in the Helen Mountains at an elevation of about 3200 meters.

== Literature ==
- Wu Zheng-yi, Peter H. Raven (Ed.): Flora of China. Volume 4: Cycadaceae through Fagaceae. Science Press / Missouri Botanical Garden Press, Beijing / St. Louis 1999, ISBN 0-915279-70-3, pp. 218, 220, 221 (English).
- Helmut Genaust: Etymological dictionary of botanical plant names. 3rd, completely revised and expanded edition. Nikol, Hamburg 2005, ISBN 3-937872-16-7, p. 552 (reprint from 1996).
