= Haibei Qilian Airport =

Haibei Qilian Airport 海北祁连机场
- IATA: HBQ; ICAO: ZLHB

Summary
- Airport type: Public
- Serves: Qilian, Qinghai, China
- Elevation AMSL: 3,163 m / 10,377 ft
- Coordinates: 38.012°N 100.644°E

Map
- Location of airport in Qinghai

Runways
Direction	Length		Surface
Direction	m	ft	Surface
10/28	3,400	11,155	Concrete

Statistics (2021)
- Passengers: 3,612
- Aircraft movements: 172
- Cargo (metric tons): 41.2

Haibei Qilian Airport
- Simplified Chinese: 海北祁连机场
- Traditional Chinese: 海北祁連機場
Transcriptions
Standard Mandarin
- Hanyu Pinyin: Hǎiběi Qílián Jīchǎng

Haibei Qilian Airport (IATA: HBQ, ICAO: ZLHB) is an airport serving Qilian County in Haibei Tibetan Autonomous Prefecture, Qinghai province, China. It is located 35 kilometres (22 mi) east of the county seat of Qilian. Construction began in July 2014, with an estimated investment of 1.203 billion yuan. Qilian airport was opened on 28 August 2018. It is the seventh civil airport in Qinghai.

Qilian Airport is a high-altitude airport located on the Tibetan Plateau, with an elevation of 3,163 metres (10,377 ft) above sea level.

== Facilities ==
The airport has a 3,400-meter runway, a 3,000-square-meter terminal building, and four aircraft parking places.

== Airlines and destinations ==
Airlines	Destinations
China Eastern Airlines	Xining

== See also ==
- List of airports in China
- List of the busiest airports in China
