= Herendeen Bay, Alaska =

Coordinates: 55°46′05″N 160°41′09″W

Herendeen Bay is a populated place in the Aleutians East Borough of Alaska. Located on the Alaska Peninsula, it is 90 miles (140 km) northeast of Fort Randall.

== Demographics ==
Historical population
Census	Pop.	Note	%±
1920	51		—
1940	13		—
U.S. Decennial Census

Herendeen Bay first appeared on the 1890 U.S. Census as Herendeen Bay Coal Mine, but was reported under "Ozernoi", which had a total of 45 residents and did not report a separate figure. It next appeared as Herendeen in 1920 and in 1940 as Herendeen Bay. It has not reported again since and is considered a ghost.
