= Whitefield, New Hampshire =

- Town
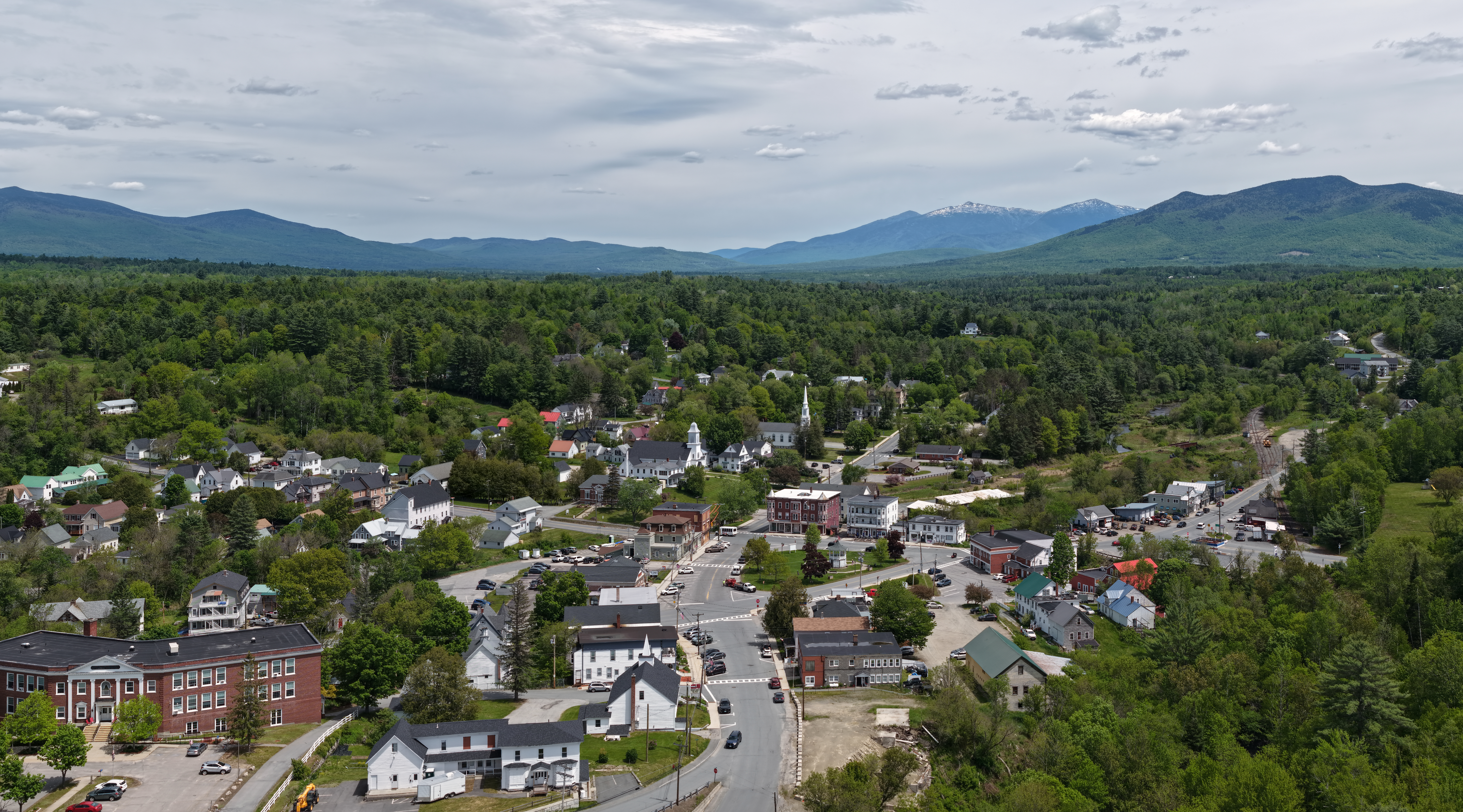
- Whitefield, NH, from the northwest

- Seal

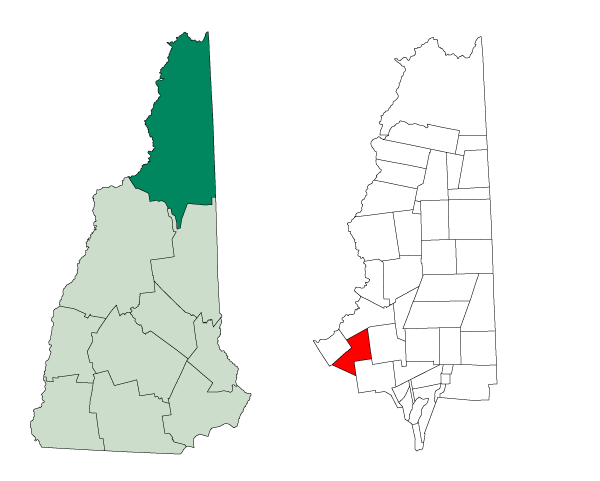
- Location in Coos County, New Hampshire
- Coordinates: 44°22′24″N 71°36′44″W
- Country: United States
- State: New Hampshire
- County: Coös
- Incorporated: 1804
- Villages: Whitefield; Hazens

Area
  - Total: 34.74 sq mi (89.97 km^{2})
  - Land: 34.26 sq mi (88.74 km^{2})
  - Water: 0.47 sq mi (1.23 km^{2}) 1.37%
- Elevation: 1,109 ft (338 m)

Population (2020)
  - Total: 2,490
  - Density: 73/sq mi (28.1/km^{2})
- Time zone: UTC-5 (Eastern)
  - Summer (DST): UTC-4 (Eastern)
- ZIP code: 03598
- Area code: 603
- FIPS code: 33-84420
- GNIS feature ID: 873754
- Website: www.whitefieldnh.gov

Whitefield is a town in Coös County, New Hampshire, United States, in the White Mountains Region. The population was 2,490 at the 2020 census. Situated on the northern edge of the White Mountains, Whitefield is home to the Mount Washington Regional Airport and the White Mountains Regional High School.

Whitefield is part of the Berlin, NH-VT Micropolitan Statistical Area. The central village in the town, where 1,460 people resided at the 2020 census, is defined as the Whitefield census-designated place (CDP) and is located at the junction of U.S. Route 3, New Hampshire Route 116 and NH Route 142.

== History ==
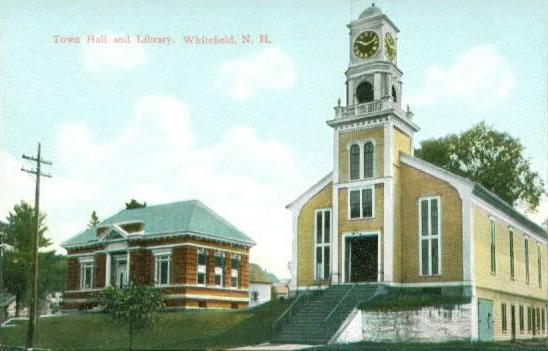
Town Hall and Library c. 1910

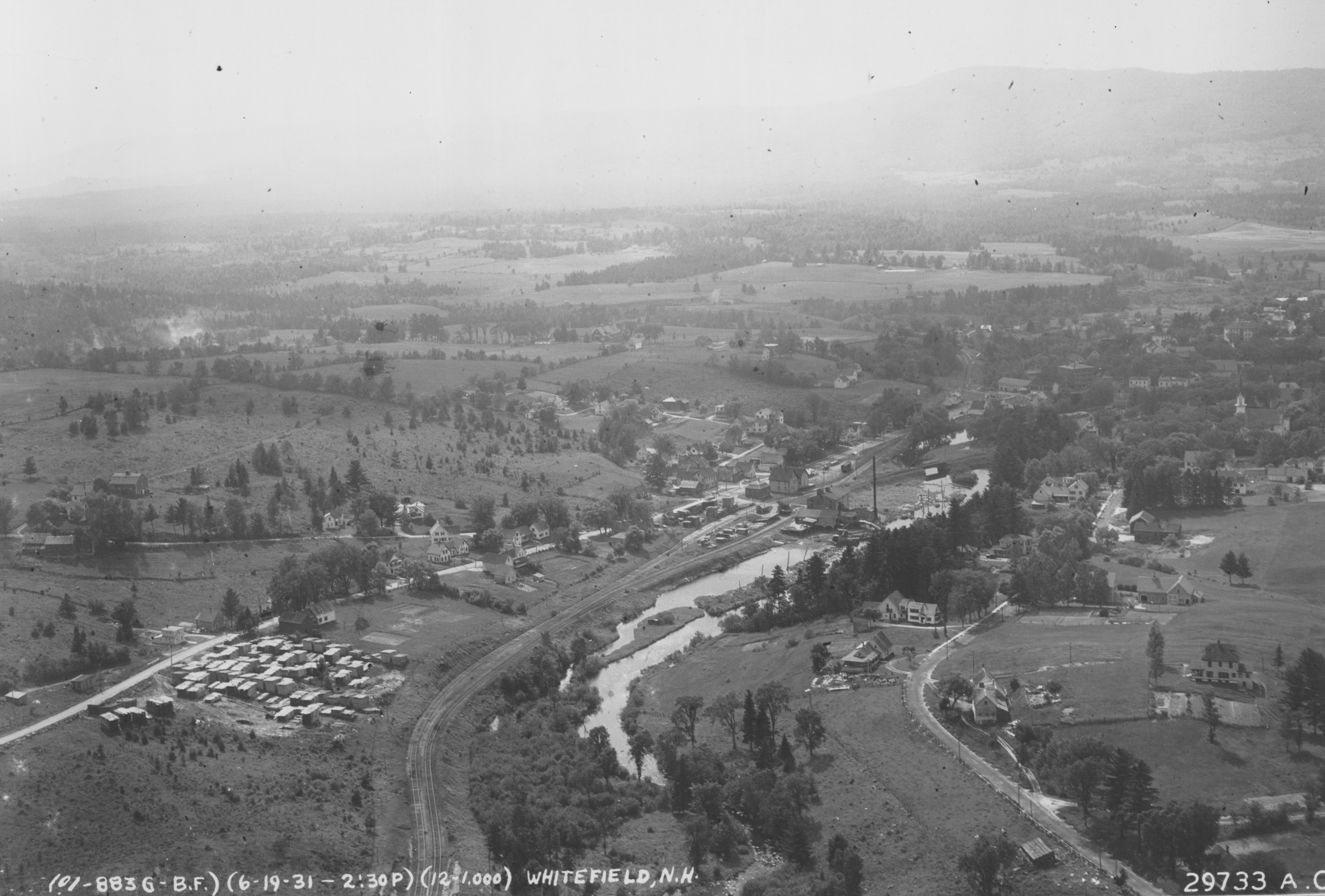
Aerial view of the town, 1930s

The last town to be granted under the English provincial government, Whitefield was chartered on July 4, 1774, exactly two years before adoption of the Declaration of Independence. Some believe it was named for George Whitefield, a famous English evangelist and a friend of William Legge, 2nd Earl of Dartmouth, the patron of Dartmouth College. Others believe the name originated from earlier references to the snowy white fields one would see upon approach through any of the surrounding mountain passages. The chartered name was "Whitefields", but the "s" was dropped on December 1, 1804, the date of incorporation. Early grantees included Jeremy Belknap, historian, and John Langdon, who succeeded John Wentworth as governor.

With the entrance of the railroad in the 19th century, tourists discovered the town and its cool, clean mountain air. They sought relief from the heat, humidity and pollution of coal-era summers in Boston, Hartford, New York and Philadelphia. Several inns and hotels were built to accommodate their increasing numbers. On a hilltop facing the Presidential Range is the grandest, the Mountain View House (now called the Mountain View Grand Resort & Spa), established in 1866. The historic hotel underwent an extensive renovation in the 2000s, and is now one of the most luxurious in New Hampshire.

The two railroad lines whose tracks crossed in the center of Whitefield were the Boston and Maine Railroad, running from Wells River, Vermont, to Berlin, New Hampshire; and the Maine Central Railroad, running from Portland, Maine, to St. Johnsbury, Vermont. Though the actual "diamond" track crossing with rails remains intact as of 2022, "guarded" by the last remaining, historic "ball"-type signal in all of New England, the tracks are mostly disused or torn-up on the old B&M line in both directions from Whitefield, and from St. Johnsbury to Fabyan station, on the Maine Central line east of Whitefield. (The Conway Scenic Railroad now operates the old Maine Central "Mountain Division" between Fabyan station and North Conway, New Hampshire.)

Whitefield has many examples of Victorian architecture, including a landmark bandstand built in 1875 on the common. The century-old town hall with bell tower was torn down in 2013. At the 2014 town meeting, voters chose to build a pre-fab building to be located outside of the town center.

== Geography ==
According to the United States Census Bureau, the town has a total area of 34.7 square miles (90.0 km^{2}), of which 34.2 square miles (88.7 km^{2}) are land and 0.46 square miles (1.2 km^{2}), or 1.37%, are water. Whitefield is drained by the Johns River, which runs through the center of town, and its tributary Bog Brook. Forest Lake, the largest lake in town, straddles the Whitefield/Dalton town line and is located southwest of the town center. Burns Lake is near Forest Lake, off Route 116 closer to the town center. Mirror Lake is a small water body close to Route 3 north of the center of town.

The two highest points in Whitefield are Howland Hill and Kimball Hill, both of which top 1,713 feet (522 m) above sea level.

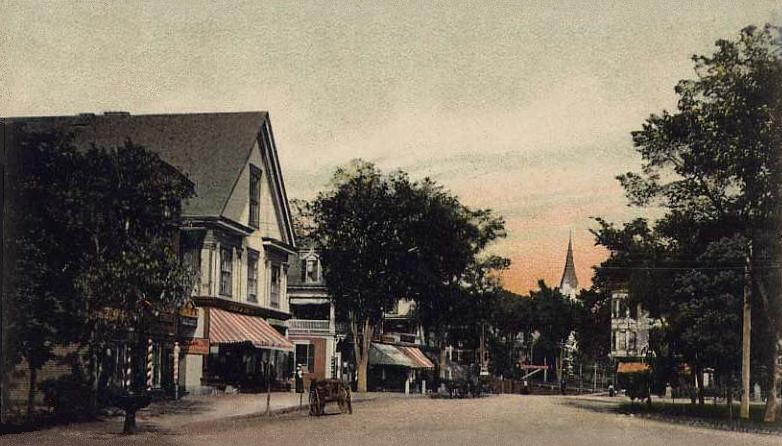
Main Street in 1907

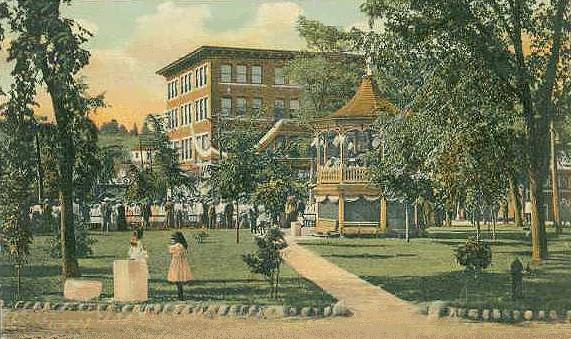
King's Square in 1905

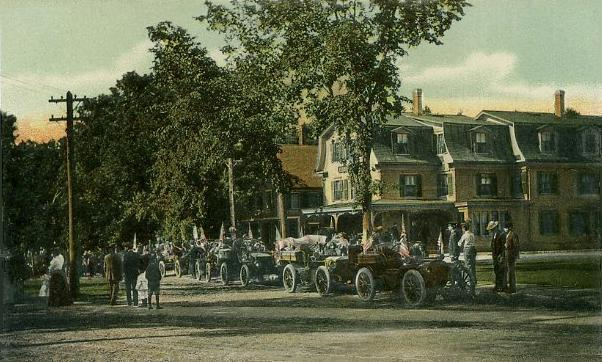
Fiske House c. 1910

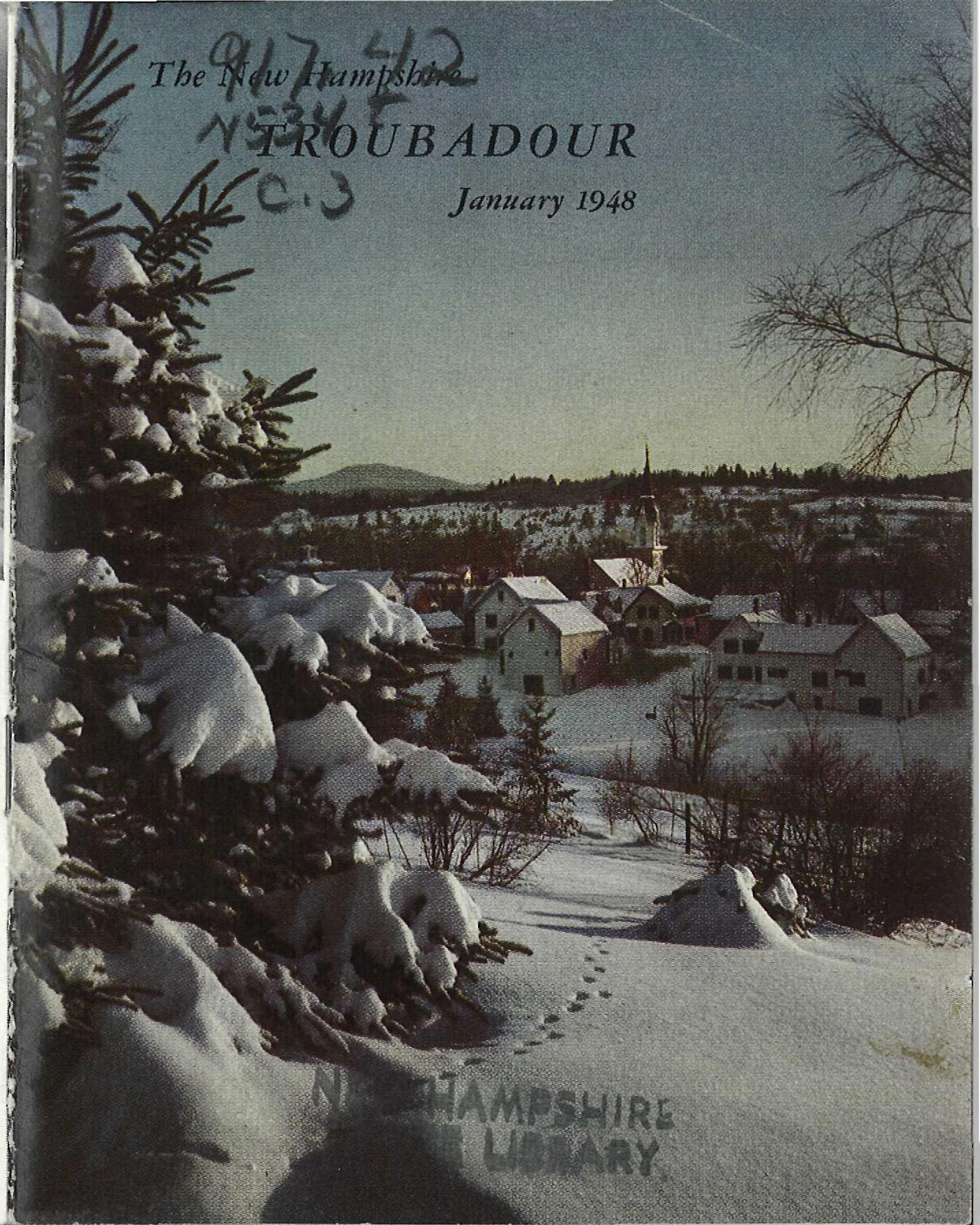
Village center c. 1948, cover of the January issue of the New Hampshire Troubadour

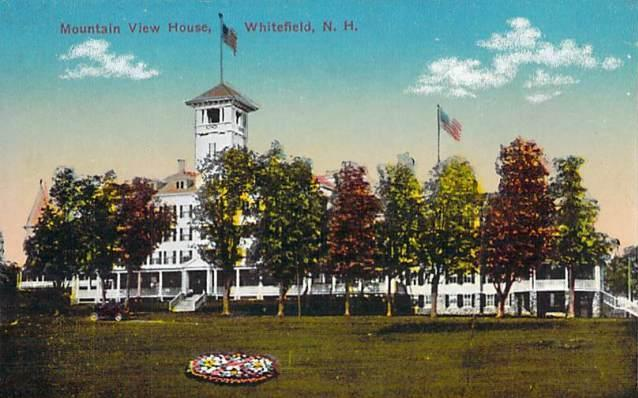
Mountain View House, Whitefield, NH

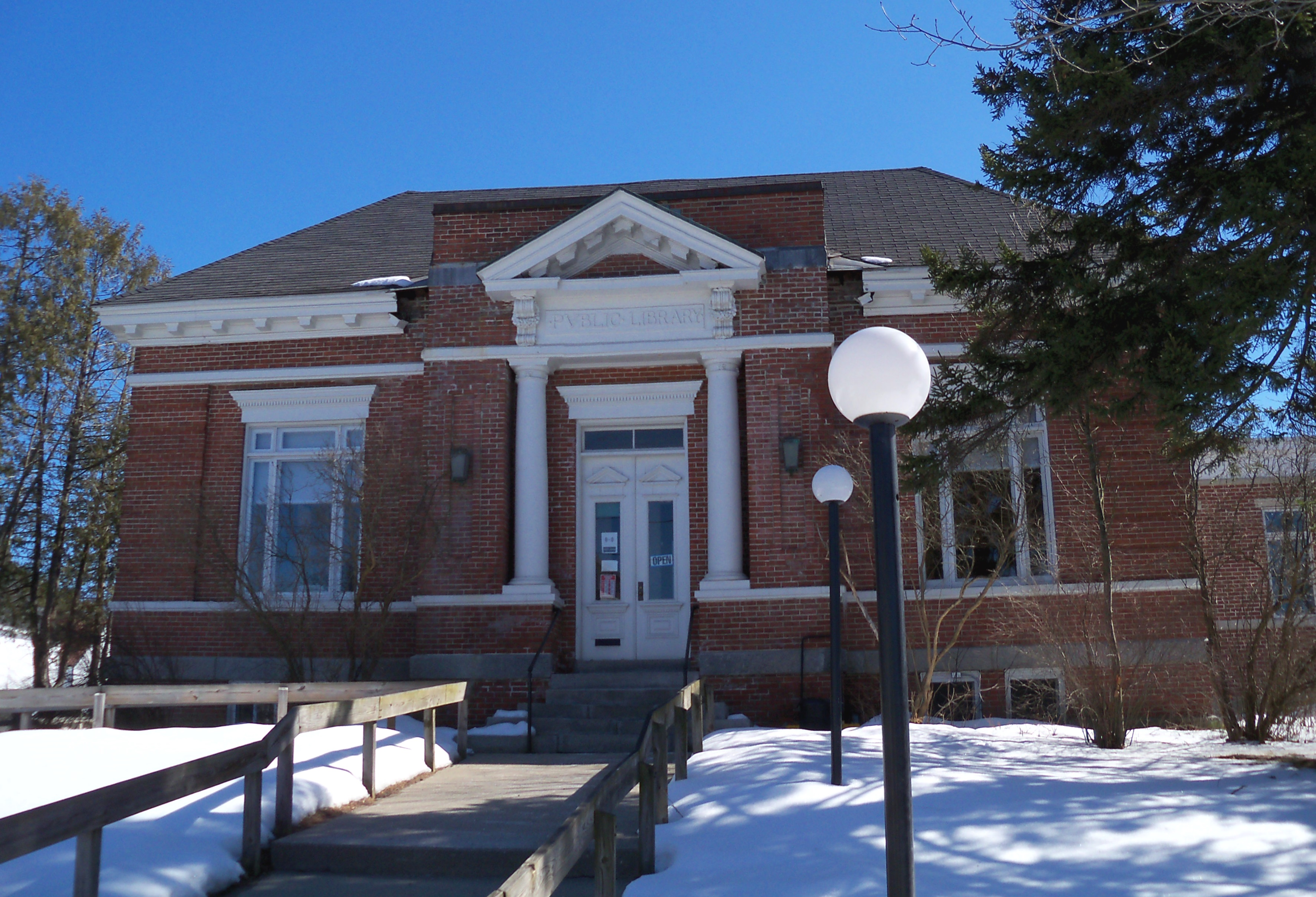
Whitefield Public Library

=== Adjacent communities ===
- Lancaster (north)
- Jefferson (east)
- Carroll (southeast)
- Bethlehem (southwest)
- Dalton (west)

=== Climate ===
Climate data for Mount Washington Regional Airport, 1991–2020 normals, extremes 1996–present
Month	Jan	Feb	Mar	Apr	May	Jun	Jul	Aug	Sep	Oct	Nov	Dec	Year
Record high °F (°C)	63 (17)	70 (21)	82 (28)	87 (31)	92 (33)	94 (34)	94 (34)	95 (35)	92 (33)	84 (29)	73 (23)	66 (19)	95 (35)
Mean maximum °F (°C)	50.7 (10.4)	51.9 (11.1)	61.0 (16.1)	77.0 (25.0)	84.8 (29.3)	88.5 (31.4)	89.2 (31.8)	87.6 (30.9)	85.4 (29.7)	75.5 (24.2)	66.8 (19.3)	54.3 (12.4)	90.7 (32.6)
Mean daily maximum °F (°C)	27.4 (−2.6)	30.9 (−0.6)	39.8 (4.3)	53.7 (12.1)	67.2 (19.6)	75.5 (24.2)	80.1 (26.7)	77.9 (25.5)	70.8 (21.6)	57.6 (14.2)	44.7 (7.1)	32.7 (0.4)	54.9 (12.7)
Daily mean °F (°C)	16.1 (−8.8)	18.1 (−7.7)	27.9 (−2.3)	41.4 (5.2)	53.2 (11.8)	61.9 (16.6)	66.6 (19.2)	64.7 (18.2)	57.1 (13.9)	45.7 (7.6)	34.9 (1.6)	23.0 (−5.0)	42.5 (5.8)
Mean daily minimum °F (°C)	4.7 (−15.2)	5.3 (−14.8)	16.0 (−8.9)	29.0 (−1.7)	39.2 (4.0)	48.3 (9.1)	53.2 (11.8)	51.4 (10.8)	43.5 (6.4)	33.9 (1.1)	25.1 (−3.8)	13.3 (−10.4)	30.2 (−1.0)
Mean minimum °F (°C)	−23.3 (−30.7)	−20.9 (−29.4)	−12.2 (−24.6)	13.9 (−10.1)	24.5 (−4.2)	32.1 (0.1)	39.8 (4.3)	37.1 (2.8)	27.6 (−2.4)	19.0 (−7.2)	5.6 (−14.7)	−12.9 (−24.9)	−26.3 (−32.4)
Record low °F (°C)	−38 (−39)	−37 (−38)	−33 (−36)	1 (−17)	19 (−7)	26 (−3)	31 (−1)	31 (−1)	19 (−7)	12 (−11)	−11 (−24)	−25 (−32)	−38 (−39)
Average precipitation inches (mm)	2.12 (54)	1.45 (37)	2.06 (52)	2.89 (73)	3.78 (96)	3.94 (100)	4.45 (113)	3.72 (94)	3.64 (92)	3.66 (93)	2.89 (73)	2.44 (62)	37.04 (941)
Average precipitation days (≥ 0.01 in)	11.3	10.7	12.7	14.3	15.0	16.7	17.3	16.6	13.4	15.4	14.2	13.8	171.4
Source: NOAA

== Demographics ==
Historical population
Census	Pop.	Note	%±
1810	51		—
1820	281		451.0%
1830	685		143.8%
1840	751		9.6%
1850	857		14.1%
1860	1,015		18.4%
1870	1,196		17.8%
1880	1,828		52.8%
1890	2,041		11.7%
1900	2,157		5.7%
1910	1,635		−24.2%
1920	1,935		18.3%
1930	1,693		−12.5%
1940	1,834		8.3%
1950	1,677		−8.6%
1960	1,581		−5.7%
1970	1,538		−2.7%
1980	1,681		9.3%
1990	1,909		13.6%
2000	2,038		6.8%
2010	2,306		13.2%
2020	2,490		8.0%
U.S. Decennial Census

As of the census of 2010, there were 2,306 people, 976 households, and 613 families residing in the town. There were 1,339 housing units, of which 363, or 27.1%, were vacant. 268 of the vacant units were for seasonal or recreational use. The racial makeup of the town was 95.6% white, 0.3% African American, 0.4% Native American, 0.7% Asian, 0.0% Native Hawaiian or Pacific Islander, 1.3% some other race, and 1.6% from two or more races. 2.0% of the population were Hispanic or Latino of any race.

Of the 976 households, 27.2% had children under the age of 18 living with them, 48.3% were headed by married couples living together, 9.7% had a female householder with no husband present, and 37.2% were non-families. 29.1% of all households were made up of individuals, and 12.4% were someone living alone who was 65 years of age or older. The average household size was 2.30, and the average family size was 2.79. In the town, 20.9% of the population were under the age of 18, 6.1% were from 18 to 24, 23.3% from 25 to 44, 31.7% from 45 to 64, and 18.0% were 65 years of age or older. The median age was 44.7 years. For every 100 females, there were 95.4 males. For every 100 females age 18 and over, there were 93.5 males.

For the period 2011–2015, the estimated median annual income for a household was $42,454, and the median income for a family was $55,833. Male full-time workers had a median income of $43,036 versus $33,563 for females. The per capita income for the town was $25,080. 12.8% of the population and 8.6% of families were below the poverty line. 19.3% of the population under the age of 18 and 9.8% of those 65 or older were living in poverty.

== Transportation ==
Whitefield is at the intersections of New Hampshire Route 116 and U.S. Route 3 and is also served by New Hampshire Route 142, which leads to Dalton and points beyond. Once important but now seldom-used railroad lines of the Maine Central and Boston and Maine railroads run through town. The Mount Washington Regional Airport is located in Whitefield. As of January 2006 Whitefield is also served by The Tri-Town Bus, a public transportation route connecting with Lancaster and Littleton.

== Sites of interest ==
- Weathervane Theatre
- Whitefield Historical Society Museum
