= Hluhluwe Airport =

- IATA: HLW; ICAO: FAHL

Summary
- Airport type: Public
- Location: Hluhluwe, KwaZulu-Natal, South Africa
- Elevation AMSL: 249 ft / 76 m
- Coordinates: 28°00.5′S 32°16.5′E

Map
- Location in KwaZulu-Natal

Runways
Direction	Length		Surface
Direction	m	ft	Surface
03/21	1,208	3,963	Grass
- Source: South African AIP

Hluhluwe Airport (IATA: HLW, ICAO: FAHL) is an airport serving Hluhluwe, a town in the KwaZulu-Natal province in South Africa.

== Facilities ==
The airport resides at an elevation of 249 feet (76 m) above mean sea level. It has one runway designated 03/21 with a grass surface measuring 1,208 by 30 metres (3,963 ft × 98 ft).
