= Mount Washington Regional Airport =

- IATA: HIE; ICAO: KHIE; FAA LID: HIE

Summary
- Airport type: Public
- Operator: Town of Whitefield
- Location: Whitefield, New Hampshire
- Elevation AMSL: 1,074 ft / 327.4 m
- Coordinates: 44°22′03.41″N 71°32′40.09″W
- Website: www.mountwashingtonairport.com

Map
- Interactive map of Mount Washington Regional Airport

Runways
Direction	Length		Surface
Direction	ft	m	Surface
10/28	4,001	1,220	Asphalt

Mount Washington Regional Airport (IATA: HIE, ICAO: KHIE, FAA LID: HIE) is a public airport located 3 miles (5 km) east of downtown Whitefield in Coos County, New Hampshire, United States. The Civil Air Patrol maintains a composite squadron at this location.

It is included in the Federal Aviation Administration (FAA) National Plan of Integrated Airport Systems for 2017–2021, in which it is categorized as a local general aviation facility.

The airport has a single, newly re-paved runway that is 4,001 feet (1,220 m) long, 75 feet (23 m) wide, at an average altitude of 1,074 feet (327 m) MSL, beneath the Yankee One Military Operations Area (MOA). It features pilot-controlled lighting. Traffic pattern altitude is 2,000 feet (610 m) MSL, and pilots must make right traffic for runway 28 unless winds require use of Runway 10 during landing. Scheduled runway improvements have been completed and accepted which include re-alignment and resurfacing of a lengthened runway from 3,495 to 4,100 feet (1,065 to 1,250 m).

== See also ==
- List of airports in New Hampshire
