= 1962 United States Senate elections =

- November 6, 1962
- Class 3

39 (Note: Including one Class 1 special election and four Class 2 special elections.) of the 100 seats in the United States Senate 51 seats needed for a majority
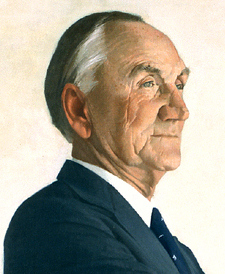

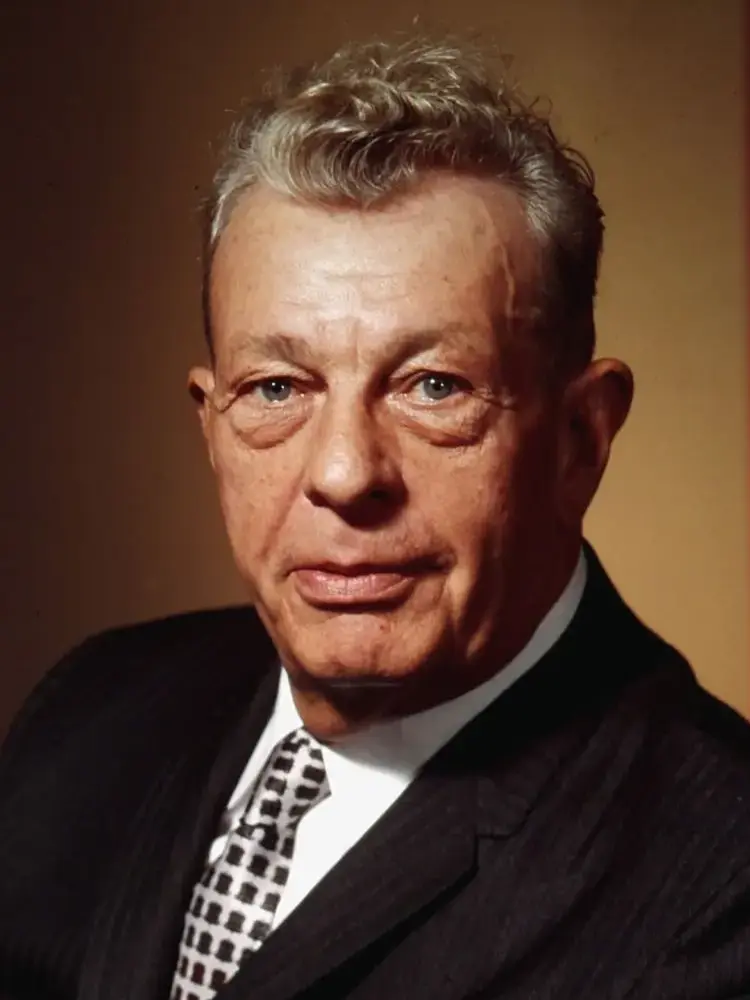
	Majority party	Minority party
Leader	Mike Mansfield	Everett Dirksen
Party	Democratic	Republican
Leader since	January 3, 1961	January 3, 1959
Leader's seat	Montana	Illinois
Seats before	64	36
Seats after	68	32
Seat change	▲4	▼4
Popular vote	21,387,598	20,897,719
Percentage	50.3%	49.1%
Seats up	21	18
Races won	25	14
- Results of the elections: Democratic gain Democratic hold Republican gain Republican hold No election Rectangular inset (Id., Kan. & N. H.): both seats up for election
Majority Leader before election
Mike Mansfield
Democratic
Elected Majority Leader
Mike Mansfield
Democratic

The 1962 United States Senate elections was an election for the United States Senate. Held on November 6, the 34 seats of Class 3 were contested in regular elections. Special elections were also held to fill vacancies. They occurred in the middle of President John F. Kennedy's term. His Democratic Party made a net gain of four seats from the Republicans, increasing their control of the Senate to 68–32. However, this was reduced to 67–33 between the election and the next Congress, as on November 18, 1962, Democrat Dennis Chávez, who was not up for election that year, died. He was replaced on November 30, 1962, by Republican appointee Edwin L. Mechem. Additionally, Democrat Strom Thurmond became a Republican in 1964, further reducing Democrats to 66–34. This was the first time since 1932 that Democrats gained seats in this class of senators.

This was the first time since 1914 that the president's party gained seats in the Senate and lost seats in the House. This would occur again in 1970, 2018, and 2022.

This was also the first regular Senate election to elect a senator from Hawaii.

== Results summary ==
↓
68	32
Democratic	Republican

Parties				Total
Parties	Democratic	Republican	Other	Total
Last elections (1960) Before these elections	64	36	0	100
Not up	43	18	0	61
Up	21	18	—	39
Class 3 (1956→1962)	19	15	—	34
Special: Class 1	1	0	—	1
Special: Class 2	1	3	—	4
Incumbent retired	2	2	—	4
Held by same party	2	0	—	2
Replaced by other party	▼2 Republicans replaced by ▲2 Democrats		—	2
Result	4	0	0	4
Incumbent ran	19	16 (Note: In New Hampshire special election, Maurice J. Murphy Jr. lost nomination to represent the state and Perkins Bass became the party's new nominee.)	—	35
Won re-election	17	12	—	29
Lost re-election	▼3 Republicans replaced by ▲3 Democrats ▼2 Democrats replaced by ▲2 Republicans		—	5
Lost renomination, but held by same party	0	0	—	0
Lost renomination, and party lost	▼1 Republican replaced by ▲1 Democrat		—	1
Result	21	14	0	35
Total elected	25	14	0	39
Net gain/loss	▲4	▼4	Steady	4
Nationwide vote	21,387,598	20,897,719	258,084	42,543,401
Share	50.27%	49.12%	0.61%	100%
Result	68	32	0	100

== Gains, losses, and holds ==
=== Retirements ===
Two Republicans and two Democrats retired instead of seeking re-election.

State	Senator	Replaced by
Connecticut	Prescott Bush	Abraham Ribicoff
Hawaii	Oren E. Long	Daniel Inouye
Maryland	John Marshall Butler	Daniel Brewster
Massachusetts	Benjamin A. Smith II	Ted Kennedy

=== Defeats ===
Four Republicans and two Democrats sought re-election but lost in the primary or general election.

State	Senator	Replaced by
Colorado	John A. Carroll	Peter H. Dominick
Indiana	Homer E. Capehart	Birch Bayh
New Hampshire (special)	Maurice J. Murphy Jr.	Thomas J. McIntyre
South Dakota	Joe Bottum	George McGovern
Wisconsin	Alexander Wiley	Gaylord Nelson
Wyoming (special)	Joe Hickey	Milward Simpson

=== Post-election changes ===
State	Senator	Replaced by
California (Class 1)	Clair Engle	Pierre Salinger
New Mexico (Class 1)	Dennis Chávez	Edwin L. Mechem
Tennessee (Class 2)	Estes Kefauver	Herbert S. Walters

=== Post-election changes ===
One Democrat switched to a Republican in September 1964.

State	Senator	Replaced by
South Carolina (Class 2)	Strom Thurmond	Strom Thurmond

== Change in composition ==
=== Before the elections ===
D_{1}	D_{2}	D_{3}	D_{4}	D_{5}	D_{6}	D_{7}	D_{8}	D_{9}	D_{10}
D_{20}	D_{19}	D_{18}	D_{17}	D_{16}	D_{15}	D_{14}	D_{13}	D_{12}	D_{11}
D_{21}	D_{22}	D_{23}	D_{24}	D_{25}	D_{26}	D_{27}	D_{28}	D_{29}	D_{30}
D_{40}	D_{39}	D_{38}	D_{37}	D_{36}	D_{35}	D_{34}	D_{33}	D_{32}	D_{31}
D_{41}	D_{42}	D_{43}	D_{44} Ala. Ran	D_{45} Alaska; Ran	D_{46} Ariz. Ran	D_{47} Ark. Ran	D_{48} Colo. Ran	D_{49} Fla. Ran	D_{50} Ga. Ran
Majority →									D_{51} Hawaii; Retired
D_{60} Ore. Ran	D_{59} Okla. Ran	D_{58} Ohio; Ran	D_{57} N.C. Ran	D_{56} Nev. Ran	D_{55} Mo. Ran	D_{54} Mass. (sp); Retired	D_{53} La. Ran	D_{52} Idaho (reg); Ran	D_{51} Hawaii; Retired
D_{61} Pa. Ran	D_{62} S.C. Ran	D_{63} Wash. Ran	D_{64} Wyo. (sp); Ran	R_{36} Wisc. Ran	R_{35} Vt. Ran	R_{34} Utah; Ran	R_{33} S.D. Ran	R_{32} N.D. Ran	R_{31} N.Y. Ran
R_{30} N.H. (sp); Ran	R_{29} N.H. (reg); Ran	R_{28} Md. Retired	R_{27} Ky. Ran	R_{26} Kan. (sp); Ran	R_{25} Kan. (reg); Ran	R_{24} Iowa; Ran	R_{23} Ind. Ran	R_{22} Ill. Ran	R_{21} Idaho (sp); Ran
R_{20} Conn. Retired	R_{19} Calif. Ran	R_{18}	R_{17}	R_{16}	R_{15}	R_{14}	R_{13}	R_{12}	R_{11}
R_{1}	R_{2}	R_{3}	R_{4}	R_{5}	R_{6}	R_{7}	R_{8}	R_{9}	R_{10}

=== Elections results ===
D_{1}	D_{2}	D_{3}	D_{4}	D_{5}	D_{6}	D_{7}	D_{8}	D_{9}	D_{10}
D_{20}	D_{19}	D_{18}	D_{17}	D_{16}	D_{15}	D_{14}	D_{13}	D_{12}	D_{11}
D_{21}	D_{22}	D_{23}	D_{24}	D_{25}	D_{26}	D_{27}	D_{28}	D_{29}	D_{30}
D_{40}	D_{39}	D_{38}	D_{37}	D_{36}	D_{35}	D_{34}	D_{33}	D_{32}	D_{31}
D_{41}	D_{42}	D_{43}	D_{44} Ala. Re-elected	D_{45} Alaska; Re-elected	D_{46} Ariz. Re-elected	D_{47} Ark. Re-elected	D_{48} Fla. Re-elected	D_{49} Ga. Re-elected	D_{50} Hawaii; Hold
Majority →									D_{51} Idaho (reg); Re-elected
D_{60} Pa. Re-elected	D_{59} Ore. Re-elected	D_{58} Okla. Re-elected	D_{57} Ohio; Re-elected	D_{56} N.C. Re-elected	D_{55} Nev. Re-elected	D_{54} Mo. Re-elected	D_{53} Mass. (sp); Hold	D_{52} La. Re-elected	D_{51} Idaho (reg); Re-elected
D_{61} S.C. Re-elected	D_{62} Wash. Re-elected	D_{63} Conn. Gain	D_{64} Ind. Gain	D_{65} Md. Gain	D_{66} N.H. (sp); Gain	D_{67} S.D. Gain (Note: Appointee defeated)	D_{68} Wisc. Gain	R_{32} Wyo. (sp); Gain	R_{31} Colo. Gain
R_{30} Vt. Re-elected	R_{29} Utah; Re-elected	R_{28} N.D. Re-elected	R_{27} N.Y. Re-elected	R_{26} N.H. (reg); Re-elected	R_{25} Ky. Re-elected	R_{24} Kan. (sp); Elected (Note: Appointee elected)	R_{23} Kan. (reg); Re-elected	R_{22} Iowa; Re-elected	R_{21} Ill. Re-elected
R_{20} Idaho (sp); Elected	R_{19} Calif. Re-elected	R_{18}	R_{17}	R_{16}	R_{15}	R_{14}	R_{13}	R_{12}	R_{11}
R_{1}	R_{2}	R_{3}	R_{4}	R_{5}	R_{6}	R_{7}	R_{8}	R_{9}	R_{10}

=== Beginning of the next Congress ===
D_{1}	D_{2}	D_{3}	D_{4}	D_{5}	D_{6}	D_{7}	D_{8}	D_{9}	D_{10}
D_{20}	D_{19}	D_{18}	D_{17}	D_{16}	D_{15}	D_{14}	D_{13}	D_{12}	D_{11}
D_{21}	D_{22}	D_{23}	D_{24}	D_{25}	D_{26}	D_{27}	D_{28}	D_{29}	D_{30}
D_{40}	D_{39}	D_{38}	D_{37}	D_{36}	D_{35}	D_{34}	D_{33}	D_{32}	D_{31}
D_{41}	D_{42}	D_{43}	D_{44}	D_{45}	D_{46}	D_{47}	D_{48}	D_{49}	D_{50}
Majority →									D_{51}
D_{60}	D_{59}	D_{58}	D_{57}	D_{56}	D_{55}	D_{54}	D_{53}	D_{52}	D_{51}
D_{61}	D_{62}	D_{63}	D_{64}	D_{65}	V_{1} Okla. Died	V_{2} Wisc. Delayed	R_{33} N.M. Gain	R_{32}	R_{31}
R_{21}	R_{22}	R_{23}	R_{24}	R_{25}	R_{26}	R_{27}	R_{28}	R_{29}	R_{30}
R_{20}	R_{19}	R_{18}	R_{17}	R_{16}	R_{15}	R_{14}	R_{13}	R_{12}	R_{11}
R_{1}	R_{2}	R_{3}	R_{4}	R_{5}	R_{6}	R_{7}	R_{8}	R_{9}	R_{10}

Key

D_{#}	Democratic
R_{#}	Republican
V_{#}	Vacant

== Race summaries ==
=== Special elections during the 87th Congress ===
In these special elections, the winner was seated during 1962 or before January 3, 1963; ordered by election date, then state.

State	Incumbent			Results	Candidates
State	Senator	Party	Electoral history	Results	Candidates
Idaho (Class 2)	Len Jordan	Republican	1962 (Appointed)	Interim appointee elected.	▌ ✓ Len Jordan (Republican) 51.0%; ▌Gracie Pfost (Democratic) 49.0%
Kansas (Class 2)	James B. Pearson	Republican	1962 (Appointed)	Interim appointee elected.	▌ ✓ James B. Pearson (Republican) 56.2%; ▌Paul L. Aylward (Democratic) 42.5%
Massachusetts (Class 1)	Benjamin A. Smith II	Democratic	1960 (Appointed)	Interim appointee retired. New senator elected. Democratic hold.	▌ ✓ Ted Kennedy (Democratic) 55.4%; ▌George C. Lodge (Republican) 41.9%
New Hampshire (Class 2)	Maurice J. Murphy Jr.	Republican	1961 (Appointed)	Interim appointee lost nomination New senator elected. Democratic gain.	▌ ✓ Thomas J. McIntyre (Democratic) 52.3%; ▌Perkins Bass (Republican) 47.7%
Wyoming (Class 2)	Joe Hickey	Democratic	1961 (Appointed)	Interim appointee lost election New senator elected. Republican gain.	▌ ✓ Milward Simpson (Republican) 57.8%; ▌Joe Hickey (Democratic) 42.2%

=== Elections leading to the next Congress ===
In these regular elections, the winners were elected for the term beginning January 3, 1963; ordered by state.

All of the elections involved the Class 3 seats.

State	Incumbent			Results	Candidates
State	Senator	Party	Electoral history	Results	Candidates
Alabama	J. Lister Hill	Democratic	1938 (Appointed); 1938; 1944; 1950; 1956	Incumbent re-elected.	▌ ✓ J. Lister Hill (Democratic) 50.9%; ▌James D. Martin (Republican) 49.1%
Alaska	Ernest Gruening	Democratic	1958 (New state)	Incumbent re-elected.	▌ ✓ Ernest Gruening (Democratic) 58.1%; ▌Ted Stevens (Republican) 41.9%
Arizona	Carl Hayden	Democratic	1926; 1932; 1938; 1944; 1950; 1956	Incumbent re-elected.	▌ ✓ Carl Hayden (Democratic) 54.9%; ▌Evan Mecham (Republican) 45.1%
Arkansas	J. William Fulbright	Democratic	1944; 1950; 1956	Incumbent re-elected.	▌ ✓ J. William Fulbright (Democratic) 68.7%; ▌Kenneth Jones (Republican) 31.3%
California	Thomas Kuchel	Republican	1953 (Appointed); 1954 (special); 1956	Incumbent re-elected.	▌ ✓ Thomas Kuchel (Republican) 56.3%; ▌Richard B. Richards (Democratic) 43.4%
Colorado	John A. Carroll	Democratic	1956	Incumbent lost re-election. New senator elected. Republican gain.	▌ ✓ Peter H. Dominick (Republican) 53.6%; ▌John A. Carroll (Democratic) 45.6%
Connecticut	Prescott Bush	Republican	1952 (special); 1956	Incumbent retired. New senator elected. Democratic gain.	▌ ✓ Abraham Ribicoff (Democratic) 51.3%; ▌Horace Seely-Brown Jr. (Republican) 48.8%
Florida	George Smathers	Democratic	1950; 1956	Incumbent re-elected.	▌ ✓ George Smathers (Democratic) 70.0%; ▌Emerson Rupert (Republican) 30.0%
Georgia	Herman Talmadge	Democratic	1956	Incumbent re-elected.	▌ ✓ Herman Talmadge (Democratic); Unopposed
Hawaii	Oren E. Long	Democratic	1959 (New state)	Incumbent retired. New senator elected. Democratic hold.	▌ ✓ Daniel Inouye (Democratic) 69.4%; ▌Ben Dillingham (Republican) 30.6%
Idaho	Frank Church	Democratic	1956	Incumbent re-elected.	▌ ✓ Frank Church (Democratic) 54.7%; ▌Jack Hawley (Republican) 45.3%
Illinois	Everett Dirksen	Republican	1950; 1956	Incumbent re-elected.	▌ ✓ Everett Dirksen (Republican) 52.9%; ▌Sidney R. Yates (Democratic) 47.1%
Indiana	Homer E. Capehart	Republican	1944; 1950; 1956	Incumbent lost re-election. New senator elected. Democratic gain.	▌ ✓ Birch Bayh (Democratic) 50.3%; ▌Homer E. Capehart (Republican) 49.7%
Iowa	Bourke B. Hickenlooper	Republican	1944; 1950; 1956	Incumbent re-elected.	▌ ✓ Bourke B. Hickenlooper (Republican) 53.4%; ▌Elbert B. Smith (Democratic) 46.6%
Kansas	Frank Carlson	Republican	1950 (special); 1950; 1956	Incumbent re-elected.	▌ ✓ Frank Carlson (Republican) 62.4%; ▌K. L. Smith (Democratic) 35.9%
Kentucky	Thruston Ballard Morton	Republican	1956	Incumbent re-elected.	▌ ✓ Thruston Ballard Morton (Republican) 52.8%; ▌Wilson W. Wyatt (Democratic) 47.2%
Louisiana	Russell B. Long	Democratic	1948 (special); 1950; 1956	Incumbent re-elected.	▌ ✓ Russell B. Long (Democratic) 75.6%; ▌Taylor W. O'Hearn (Republican) 24.4%
Maryland	John Marshall Butler	Republican	1950; 1956	Incumbent retired. New senator elected. Democratic gain.	▌ ✓ Daniel Brewster (Democratic) 62.0%; ▌Edward Tylor Miller (Republican) 38.0%
Missouri	Edward V. Long	Democratic	1960 (Appointed); 1960 (special)	Incumbent re-elected.	▌ ✓ Edward V. Long (Democratic) 54.6%; ▌R. Crosby Kemper Jr. (Republican) 45.4%
Nevada	Alan Bible	Democratic	1954 (special); 1956	Incumbent re-elected.	▌ ✓ Alan Bible (Democratic) 65.3%; ▌William B. Wright (Republican) 34.7%
New Hampshire	Norris Cotton	Republican	1954 (special); 1956	Incumbent re-elected.	▌ ✓ Norris Cotton (Republican) 59.7%; ▌Alfred Catalfo Jr. (Democratic) 40.3%
New York	Jacob Javits	Republican	1956	Incumbent re-elected.	▌ ✓ Jacob Javits (Republican) 57.4%; ▌James B. Donovan (Democratic) 40.1%
North Carolina	Sam Ervin	Democratic	1954 (Appointed); 1954 (special); 1956	Incumbent re-elected.	▌ ✓ Sam Ervin (Democratic) 60.5%; ▌Claude L. Greene Jr. (Republican) 39.6%
North Dakota	Milton Young	Republican	1945 (Appointed); 1946 (special); 1950; 1956	Incumbent re-elected.	▌ ✓ Milton Young (Republican) 60.7%; ▌William Lanier (Democratic-NPL) 39.4%
Ohio	Frank Lausche	Democratic	1956	Incumbent re-elected.	▌ ✓ Frank Lausche (Democratic) 61.6%; ▌John M. Briley (Republican) 38.4%
Oklahoma	Mike Monroney	Democratic	1950; 1956	Incumbent re-elected.	▌ ✓ Mike Monroney (Democratic) 53.2%; ▌B. Hayden Crawford (Republican) 46.3%
Oregon	Wayne Morse	Democratic	1944 (Note: Morse was first elected in 1944 and re-elected in 1950 as a Republican. He became an independent in 1952 and joined the Democratic Party in 1955.); 1950; 1956	Incumbent re-elected.	▌ ✓ Wayne Morse (Democratic) 54.2%; ▌Sig Unander (Republican) 45.8%
Pennsylvania	Joseph S. Clark Jr.	Democratic	1956	Incumbent re-elected.	▌ ✓ Joseph S. Clark Jr. (Democratic) 51.1%; ▌James E. Van Zandt (Republican) 48.7%
South Carolina	Olin D. Johnston	Democratic	1944; 1950; 1956	Incumbent re-elected.	▌ ✓ Olin D. Johnston (Democratic) 57.2%; ▌W. D. Workman Jr. (Republican) 42.8%
South Dakota	Joe Bottum	Republican	1962 (Appointed)	Interim appointee lost election. New senator elected. Democratic gain.	▌ ✓ George McGovern (Democratic) 50.1%; ▌Joe Bottum (Republican) 49.9%
Utah	Wallace F. Bennett	Republican	1950; 1956	Incumbent re-elected.	▌ ✓ Wallace F. Bennett (Republican) 52.4%; ▌David S. King (Democratic) 47.6%
Vermont	George Aiken	Republican	1940 (special); 1944; 1950; 1956	Incumbent re-elected.	▌ ✓ George Aiken (Republican) 66.9%; ▌W. Robert Johnson (Democratic) 33.1%
Washington	Warren Magnuson	Democratic	1944 (Appointed); 1944; 1950; 1956	Incumbent re-elected.	▌ ✓ Warren Magnuson (Democratic) 52.1%; ▌Richard G. Christensen (Republican) 47.3%
Wisconsin	Alexander Wiley	Republican	1938; 1944; 1950; 1956	Incumbent lost re-election. New senator elected. Democratic gain.	▌ ✓ Gaylord Nelson (Democratic) 52.6%; ▌Alexander Wiley (Republican) 47.2%

== Closest races ==
Nineteen races had a margin of victory under 10%:

State	Party of winner	Margin
South Dakota	Democratic (flip)	0.2%
Indiana	Democratic (flip)	0.6%
Alabama	Democratic	1.8%
Idaho (special)	Republican	2.0%
Connecticut	Democratic (flip)	2.5%
New Hampshire (special)	Democratic (flip)	4.6%
Utah	Republican	4.8%
Washington	Democratic	4.8%
Wisconsin	Democratic (flip)	5.4%
Kentucky	Republican	5.6%
Illinois	Republican	5.8%
Pennsylvania	Democratic	2.4%
Iowa	Republican	6.8%
Oklahoma	Democratic	6.9%
Colorado	Republican (flip)	8.0%
Oregon	Democratic	8.4%
Missouri	Democratic	9.2%
Idaho	Democratic	9.4%
Arizona	Democratic	9.5%

Nevada was the tipping point state, with a margin of 30.6%.

== Alabama ==
1962 United States Senate election in Alabama
- November 6, 1962
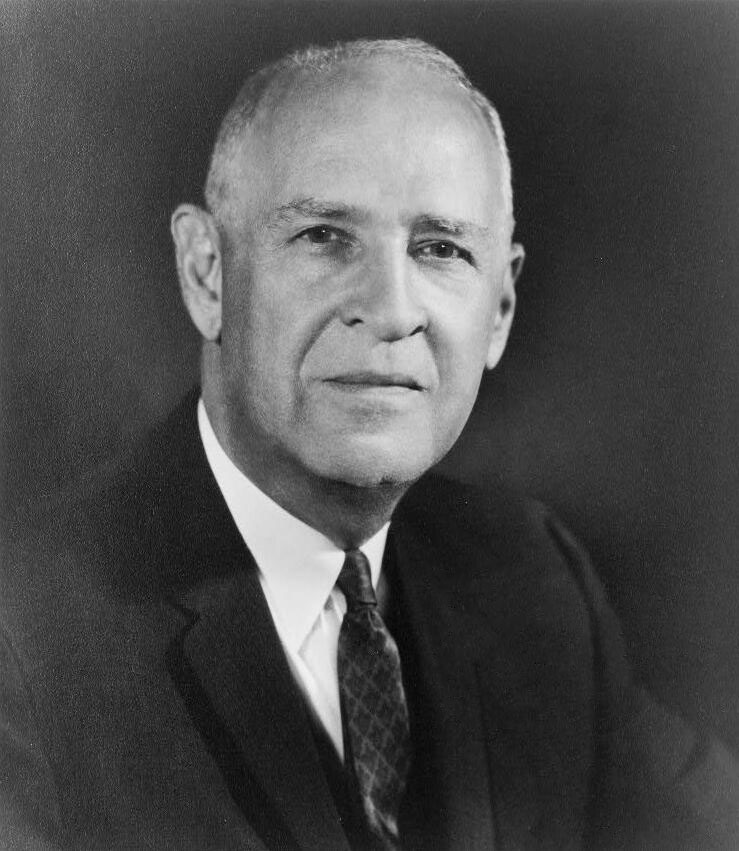

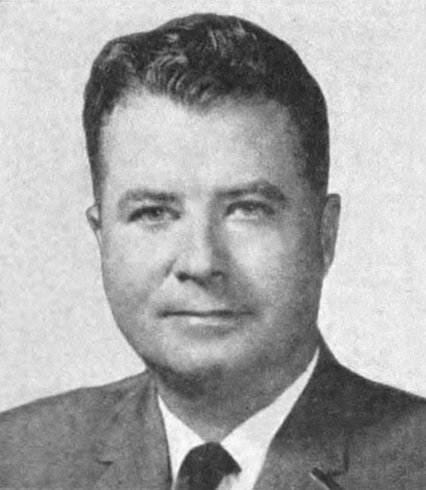
Nominee	J. Lister Hill	James D. Martin
Party	Democratic	Republican
Popular vote	201,937	195,134
Percentage	50.86%	49.14%
County results
Hill
50-60%
60-70%
70-80%
80-90%
Martin
50-60%
60-70%
70-80%
U.S. senator before election
J. Lister Hill
Democratic
Elected U.S. Senator
J. Lister Hill
Democratic

Alabama general election
Party	Candidate	Votes	%
Democratic	Lister Hill (incumbent)	201,937	50.86
Republican	James D. Martin	195,134	49.14
Majority		6,803	1.72
Turnout		397,071	
Democratic hold			

== Alaska ==
1962 United States Senate election in Alaska
- November 6, 1962
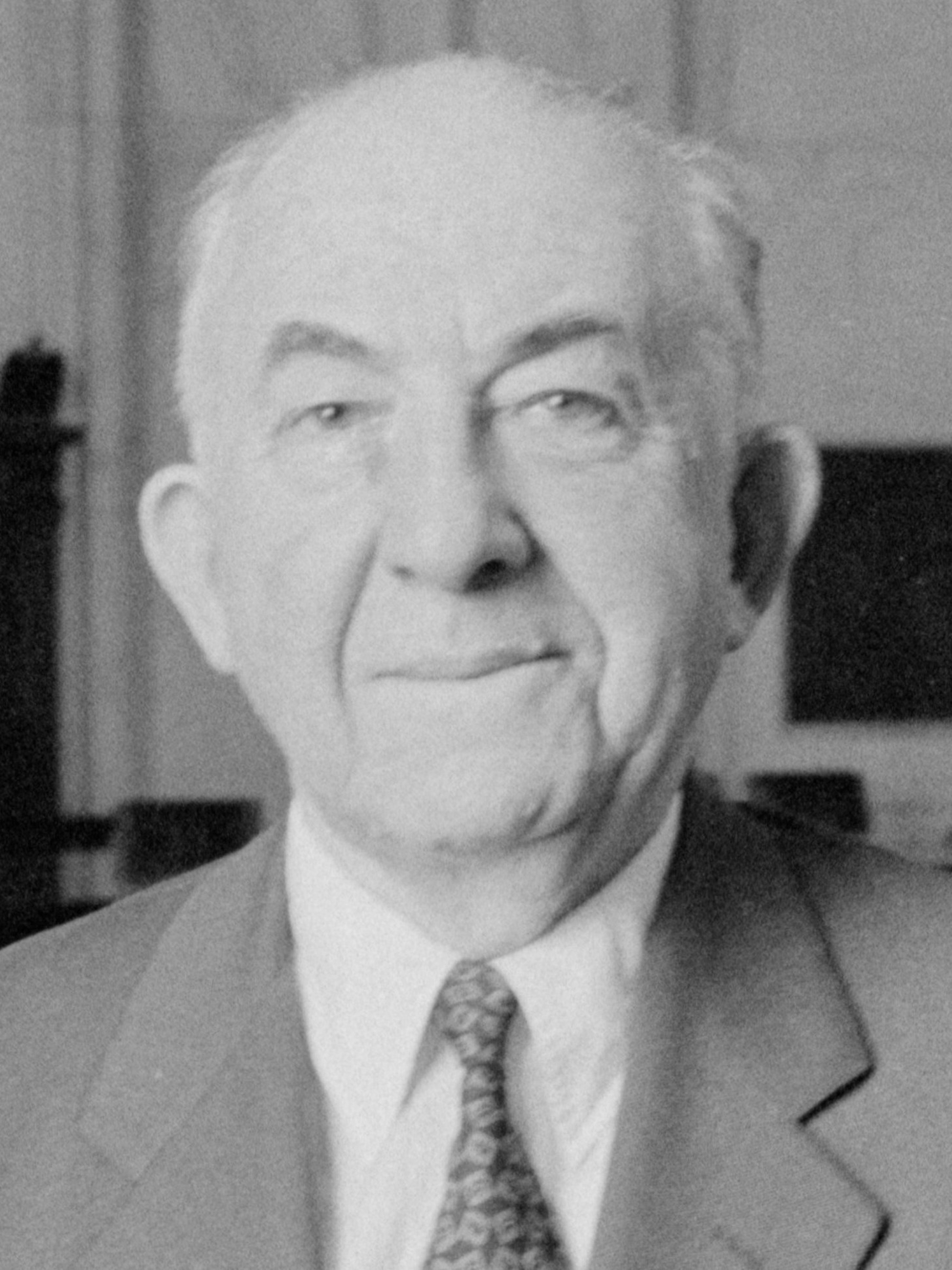

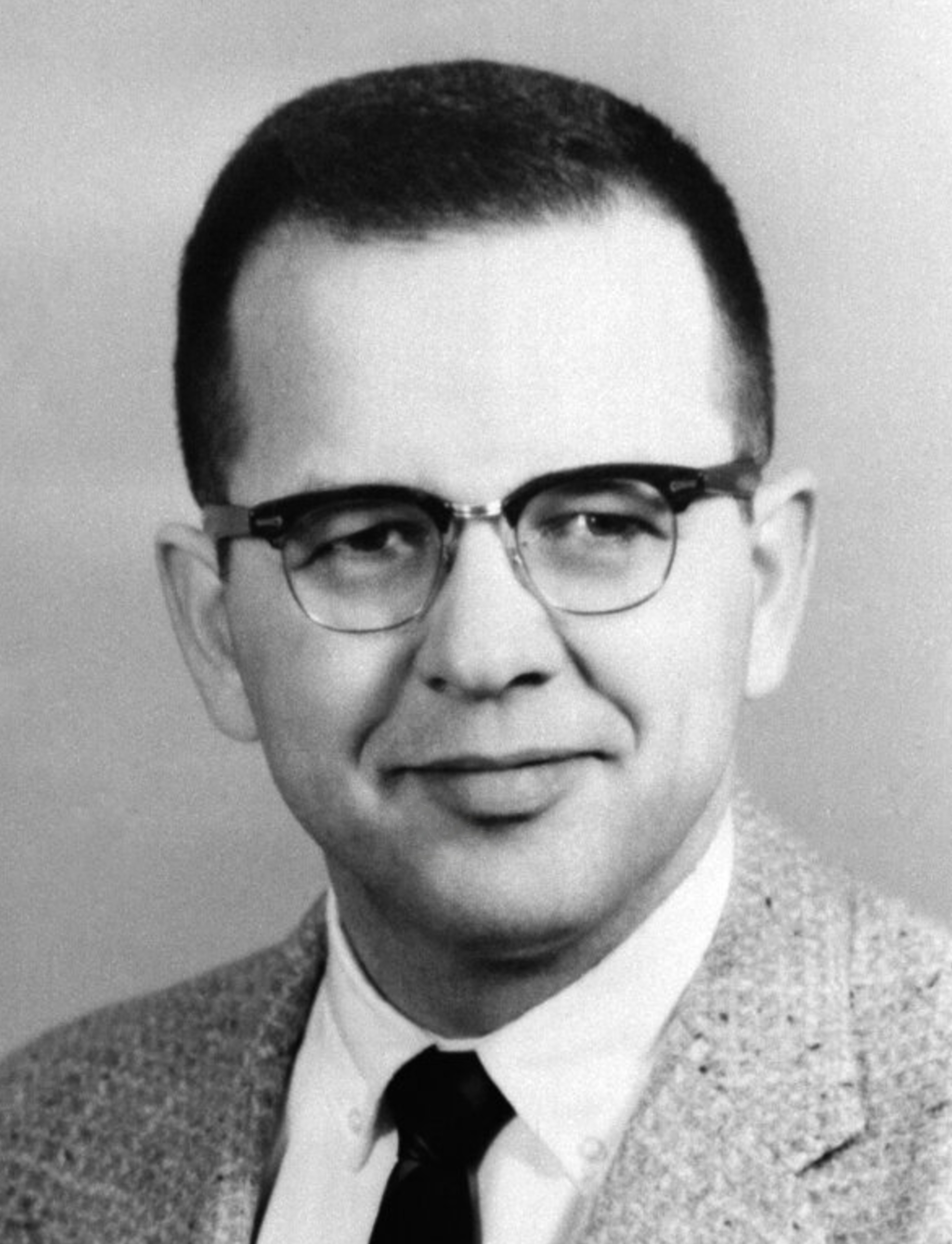
Nominee	Ernest Gruening	Ted Stevens
Party	Democratic	Republican
Popular vote	33,827	24,354
Percentage	58.14%	41.86%
- Results by state house district Gruening: 50–60% 60–70% 70–80%
U.S. senator before election
Ernest Gruening
Democratic
Elected U.S. Senator
Ernest Gruening
Democratic

Incumbent Ernest Gruening defeated the Republican challenger, former U.S. attorney, interior solicitor and future long-time U.S. Senator Ted Stevens, to win re-election to a full term.

Alaska general election
Party	Candidate	Votes	%
Democratic	Ernest Gruening (incumbent)	33,827	58.14
Republican	Ted Stevens	24,354	41.86
Majority		9,473	16.28
Turnout		58,181	
Democratic hold			

== Arizona ==
1962 United States Senate election in Arizona
- November 6, 1962
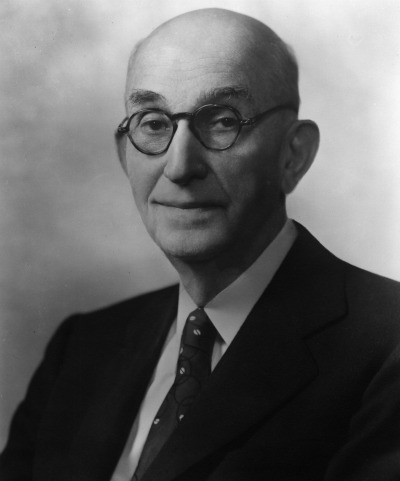

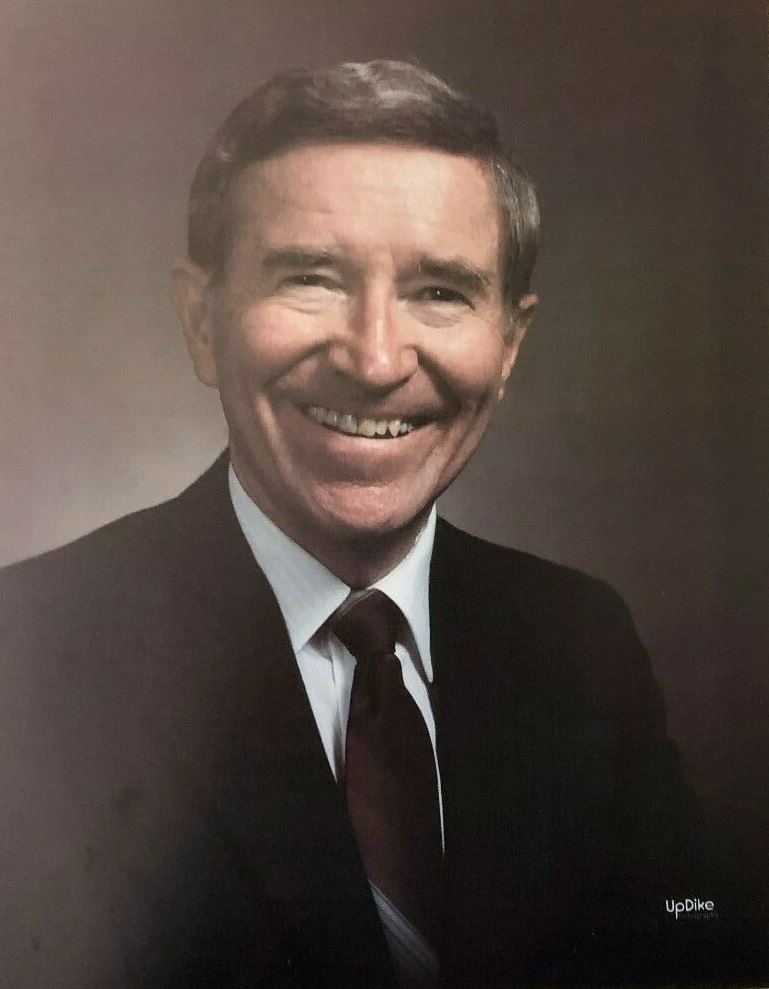
Nominee	Carl Hayden	Evan Mecham
Party	Democratic	Republican
Popular vote	199,217	163,338
Percentage	54.94%	45.06%
- County results Hayden: 50–60% 60–70% 70–80% Mecham: 50–60%
U.S. senator before election
Carl Hayden
Democratic
Elected U.S. Senator
Carl Hayden
Democratic

Incumbent Democrat Carl Hayden defeated future Governor Evan Mecham to win re-election to a seventh term.

Arizona general election
Party	Candidate	Votes	%
Democratic	Carl Hayden (incumbent)	199,217	54.94
Republican	Evan Mecham	163,388	45.06
Majority		35,829	9.88
Turnout		362,605	
Democratic hold			

== Arkansas ==
1962 U.S. Senate election in Arkansas
- November 6, 1962
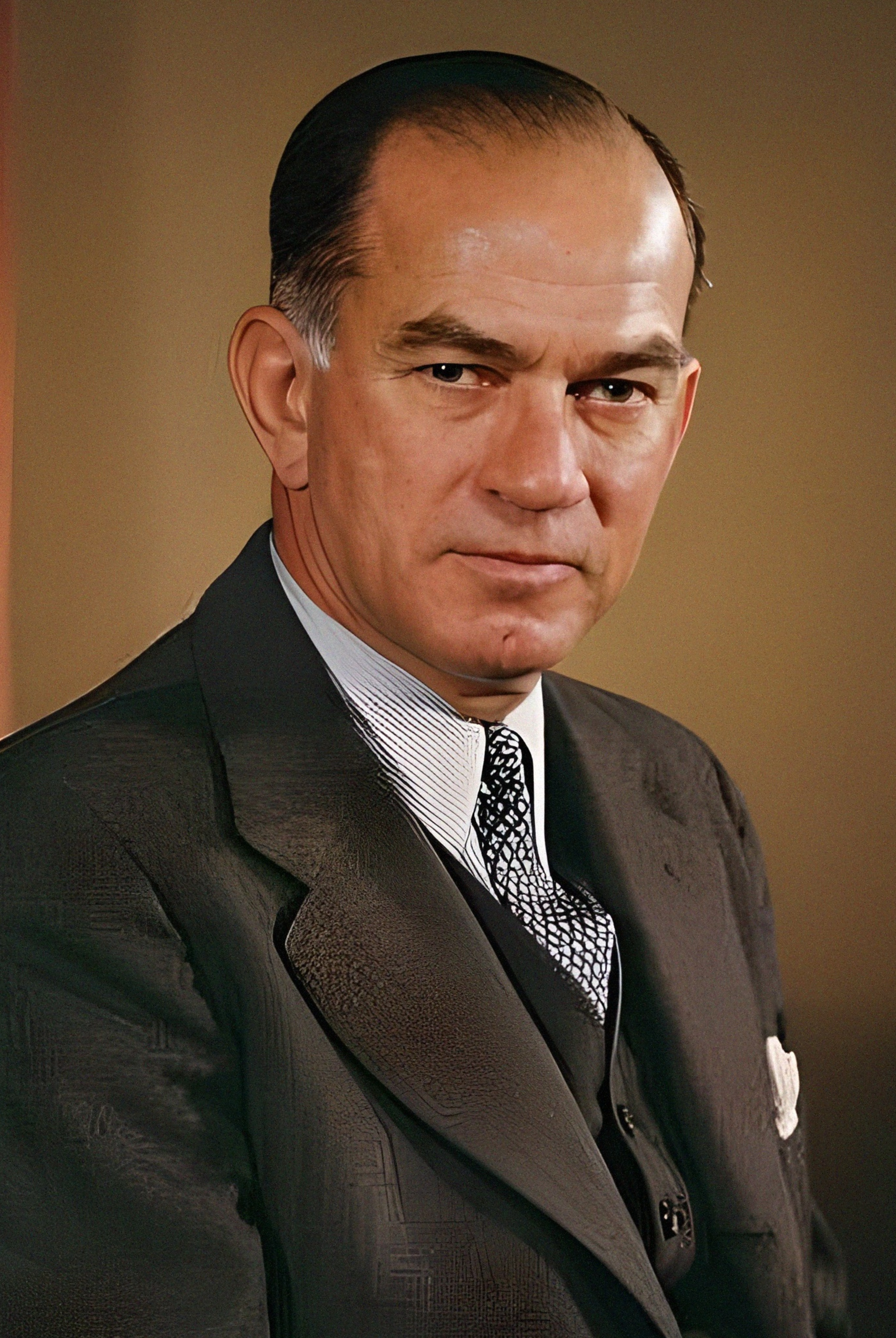

Nominee	J. William Fulbright	Kenneth G. Jones
Party	Democratic	Republican
Popular vote	214,867	98,013
Percentage	68.67%	31.33%
- County results Fulbright: 50–60% 60–70% 70–80% 80–90%
U.S. senator before election
J. William Fulbright
Democratic
Elected U.S. Senator
J. William Fulbright
Democratic

Arkansas general election
Party	Candidate	Votes	%
Democratic	J. William Fulbright (incumbent)	214,867	68.67
Republican	Kenneth Jones	98,013	31.33
Majority		116,854	37.34
Turnout		312,880	
Democratic hold			

== California ==
1962 United States Senate election in California
- November 6, 1962
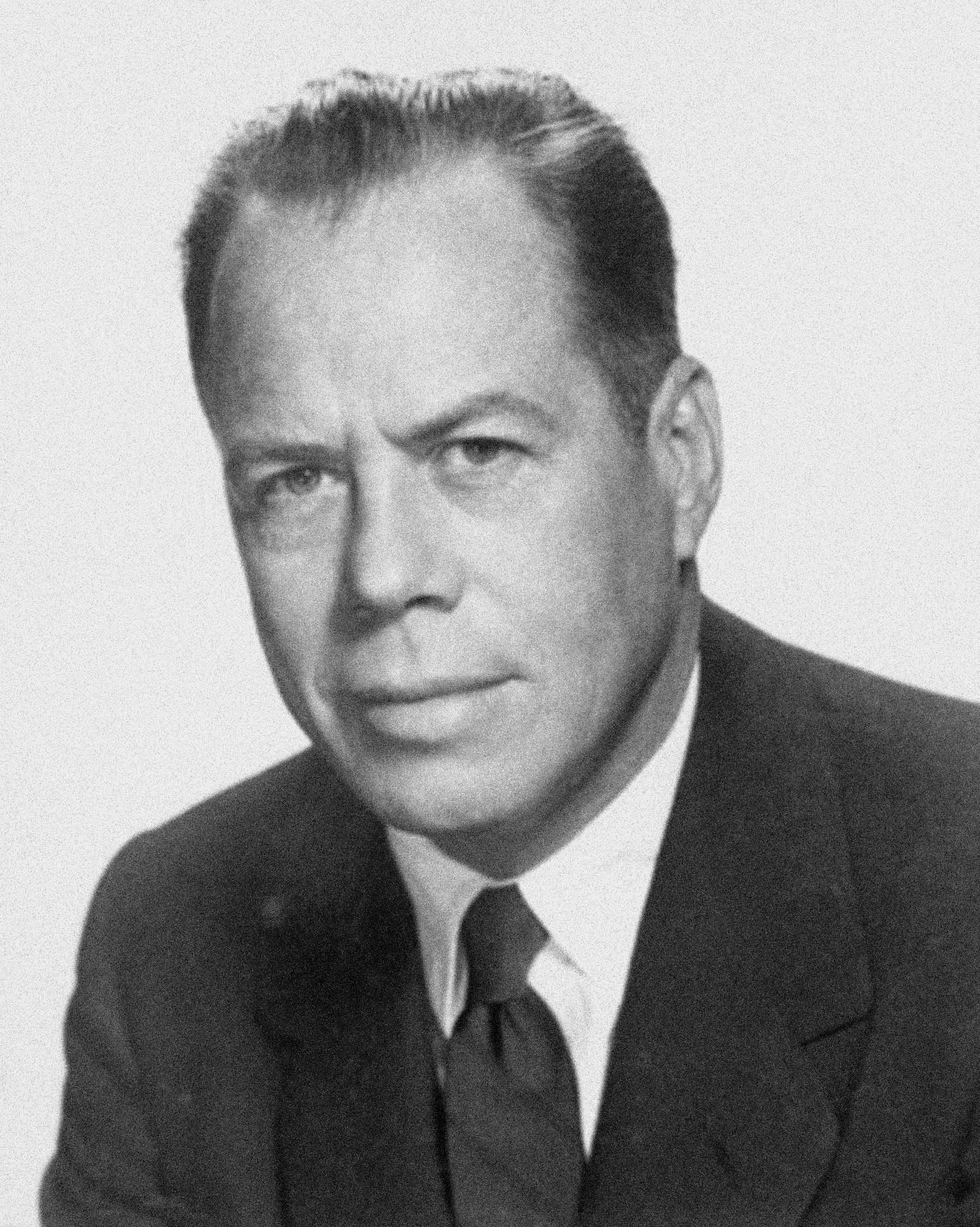

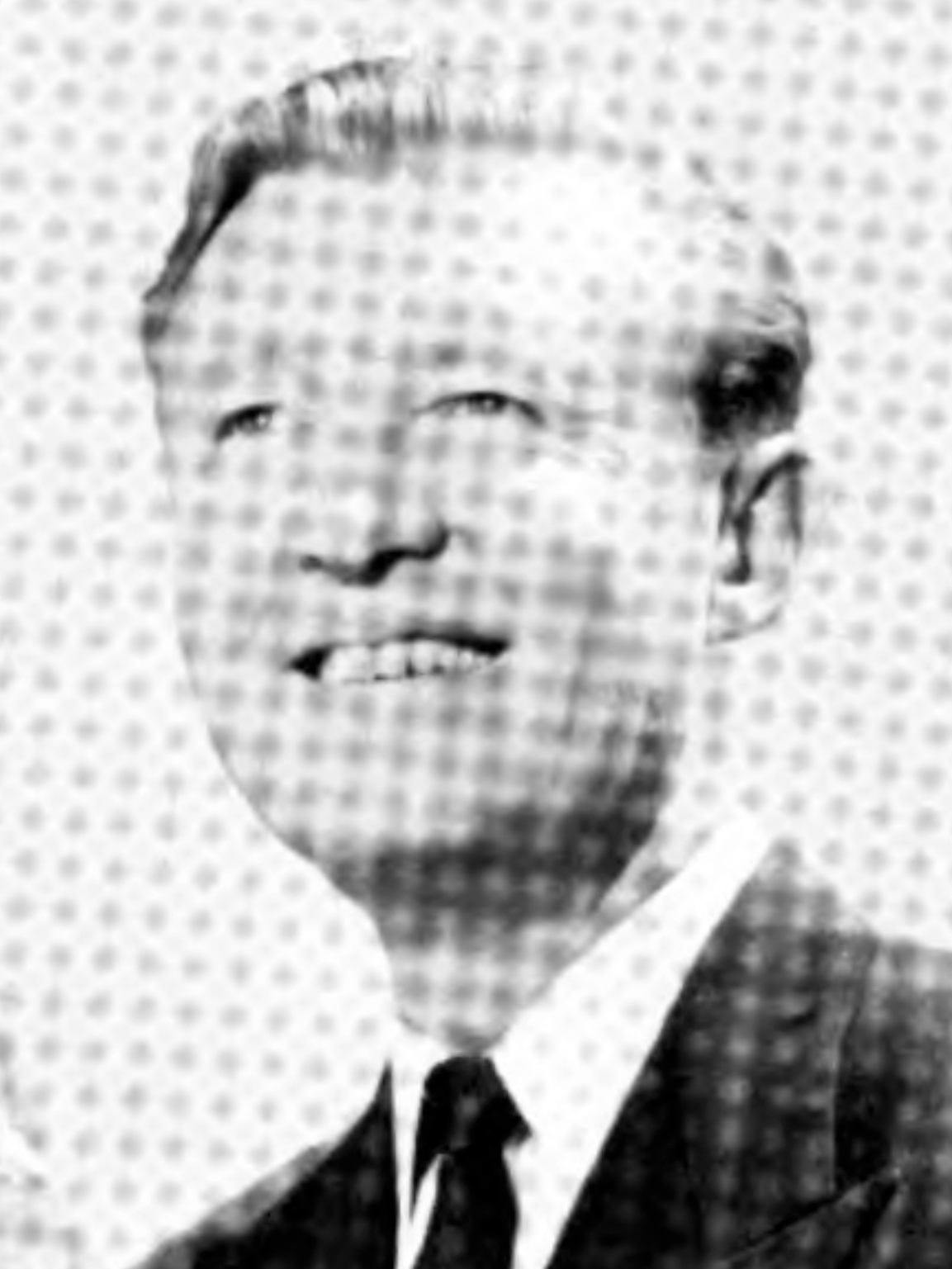
Nominee	Thomas Kuchel	Richard B. Richards
Party	Republican	Democratic
Popular vote	3,180,483	2,452,839
Percentage	56.31%	43.43%
- County results Kuchel: 50–60% 60–70% 70–80%
U.S. senator before election
Thomas Kuchel
Republican
Elected U.S. Senator
Thomas Kuchel
Republican

California general election
Party	Candidate	Votes	%
Republican	Thomas H. Kuchel (incumbent)	3,180,483	56.31
Democratic	Richard B. Richards	2,452,839	43.43
Write-In	Howard Jarvis	9,963	0.18
Write-In	Linus Pauling	2,964	0.05
Write-In	Edward Brothers	1,689	0.03
None	Scattering	284	0.01
Majority		727,644	12.88
Turnout		5,648,222	
Republican hold			

== Colorado ==
1962 United States Senate election in Colorado
- November 6, 1962
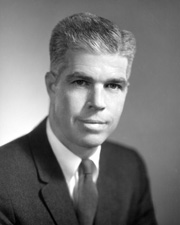

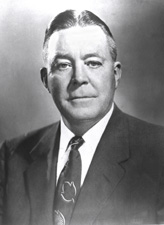
Nominee	Peter Dominick	John A. Carroll
Party	Republican	Democratic
Popular vote	328,655	279,586
Percentage	53.58%	45.58%
- County results Dominick: 40–50% 50–60% 60–70% Carroll: 40–50% 50–60% 60–70%
U.S. senator before election
John A. Carroll
Democratic
Elected U.S. Senator
Peter Dominick
Republican

Colorado general election
Party	Candidate	Votes	%
Republican	Peter H. Dominick	328,655	53.58
Democratic	John A. Carroll (incumbent)	279,586	45.58
Socialist Labor	Charlotte Benson	3,546	0.58
Independent	Henry John Olshaw	1,217	0.20
Socialist Workers	Thomas Leonard	440	0.07
Majority		49,069	8.00
Turnout		613,444	
Republican gain from Democratic			

== Connecticut ==
1962 United States Senate election in Connecticut
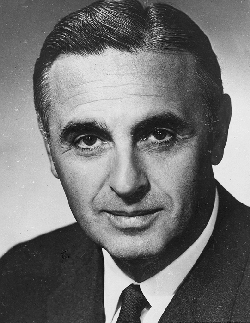

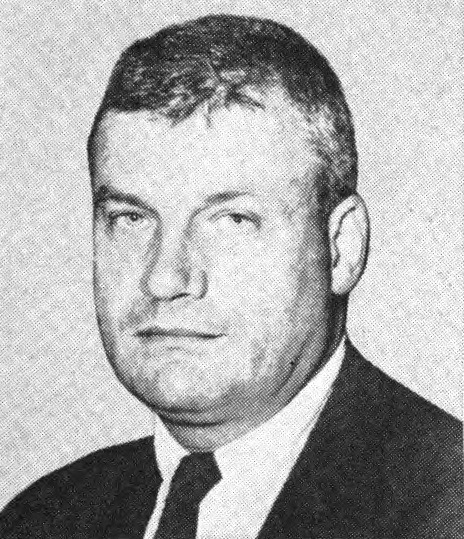
Nominee	Abraham Ribicoff	Horace Seely-Brown, Jr.
Party	Democratic	Republican
Popular vote	527,522	501,694
Percentage	51.25%	48.74%
- Ribicoff: 50–60% 60-70% Brown: 50-60% 60-70% 70-80% 80-90%
U.S. senator before election
Prescott Bush
Republican
Elected U.S. Senator
Abraham Ribicoff
Democratic

Connecticut general election
Party	Candidate	Votes	%
Democratic	Abraham Ribicoff	527,522	51.25
Republican	Horace Seely-Brown Jr.	501,694	48.74
None	Scattering	85	0.00
Majority		25,828	2.51
Turnout		1,029,301	
Democratic gain from Republican			

== Florida ==
1962 United States Senate election in Florida
- November 6, 1962
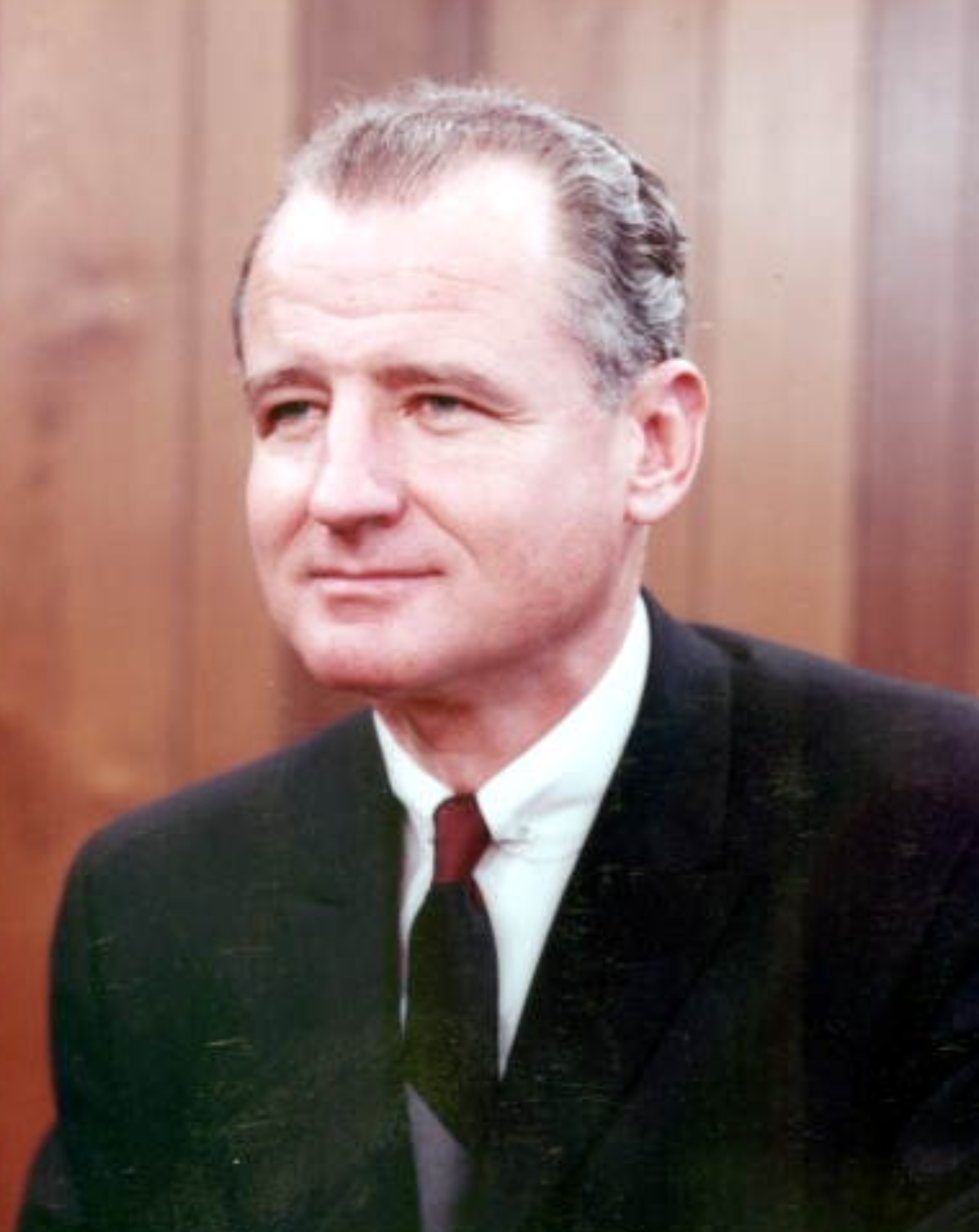

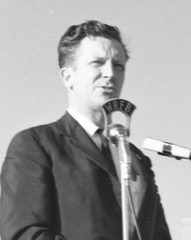
Nominee	George Smathers	Emerson Rupert
Party	Democratic	Republican
Popular vote	657,633	281,381
Percentage	70.02%	29.96%
- County results Smathers: 50–60% 60–70% 70–80% 80–90% >90%
U.S. senator before election
George Smathers
Democratic
Elected U.S. Senator
George Smathers
Democratic

1962 United States Senate election in Florida
Party	Candidate	Votes	%
Democratic	George Smathers (incumbent)	657,633	70.02
Republican	Emerson Rupert	281,381	29.96
None	Scattering	193	0.02
Majority		376,252	40.06
Turnout		939,207	
Democratic hold			

== Georgia ==
1962 U.S. Senate Democratic primary in Georgia
- September 12, 1962
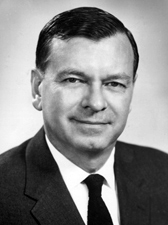

Nominee	Herman Talmadge	Henry M. Henderson
Party	Democratic	Democratic
Popular vote	673,782	91,654
Percentage	88.03%	11.79%
- County results Talmadge: 60–70% 70–80% 80–90% >90%
U.S. senator before election
Herman Talmadge
Democratic
Elected U.S. Senator
Herman Talmadge
Democratic

Georgia general election
Party	Candidate	Votes	%
Democratic	Herman Talmadge (incumbent)	306,250	100.00
Democratic hold			

== Hawaii ==
1962 United States Senate election in Hawaii
- November 6, 1962
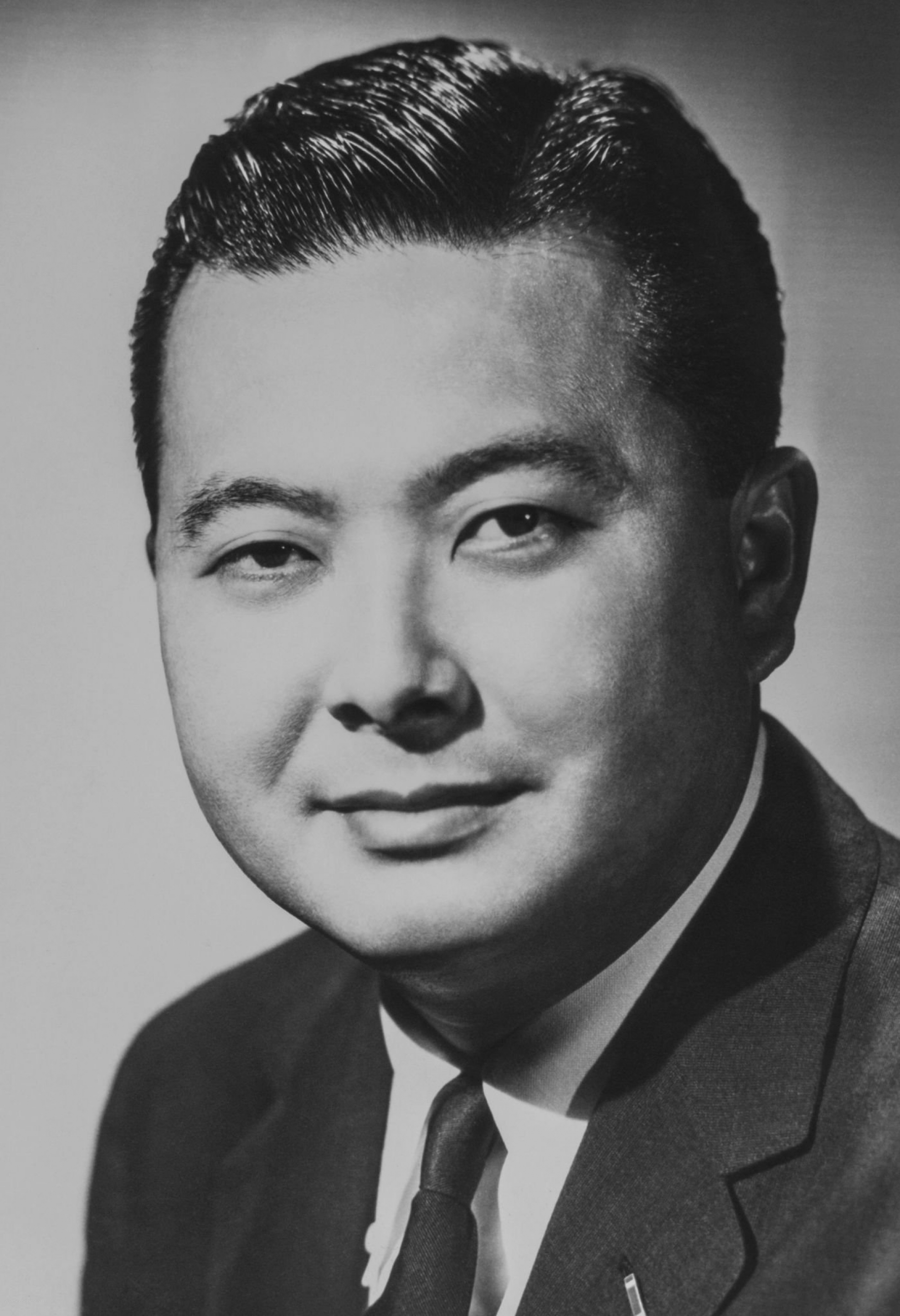

Nominee	Daniel Inouye	Ben Dillingham II
Party	Democratic	Republican
Popular vote	136,294	60,067
Percentage	69.41%	30.59%
- County results Inouye: 60–70% 70–80%
U.S. senator before election
Oren Long
Democratic
Elected U.S. Senator
Daniel Inouye
Democratic

Hawaii general election
Party	Candidate	Votes	%
Democratic	Daniel K. Inouye	136,294	69.41
Republican	Ben F. Dillingham	60,067	30.59
Majority		76,227	38.82
Turnout		196,361	
Democratic hold			

== Idaho ==
=== Idaho (regular) ===
1962 United States Senate election in Idaho
- November 6, 1962
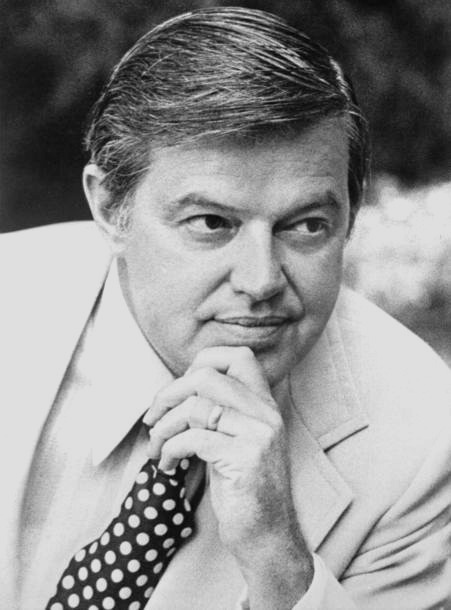

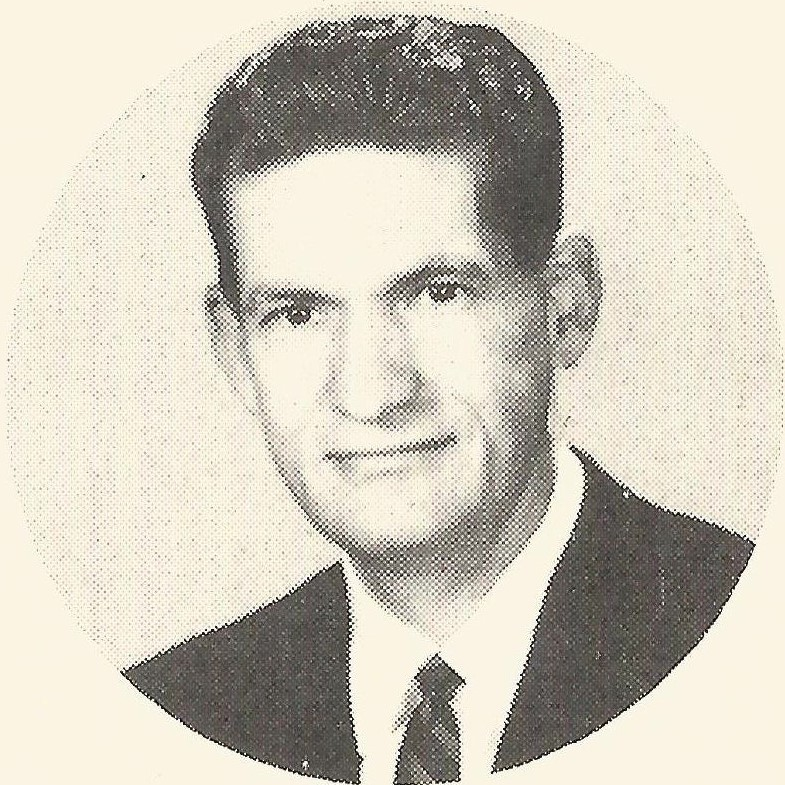
Nominee	Frank Church	Jack Hawley
Party	Democratic	Republican
Popular vote	141,657	117,129
Percentage	54.74%	45.26%
- County results Church: 50–60% 60–70% 70–80% Hawley: 50–60% Tie: 50%
U.S. senator before election
Frank Church
Democratic
Elected U.S. Senator
Frank Church
Democratic

Idaho general election
Party	Candidate	Votes	%
Democratic	Frank Church (incumbent)	141,657	54.74
Republican	Jack Hawley	117,129	45.26
Majority		24,528	9.48
Turnout		258,786	
Democratic hold			

=== Idaho (special) ===
1962 United States Senate special election in Idaho
- November 6, 1962
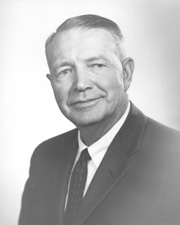

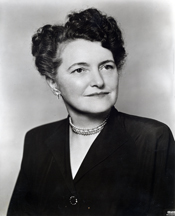
Nominee	Len Jordan	Gracie Pfost
Party	Republican	Democratic
Popular vote	131,279	126,398
Percentage	50.95%	49.05%
- County results Jordan: 50–60% 60–70% Pfost: 50–60% 60–70% 70–80% 80–90%
U.S. senator before election
Len Jordan
Republican
Elected U.S. Senator
Len Jordan
Republican

1962 United States Senate special election in Idaho
Party	Candidate	Votes	%
Republican	Len Jordan (incumbent)	131,279	50.95
Democratic	Gracie Pfost	126,398	49.05
Majority		4,881	1.90
Turnout		257,677	
Republican hold			

== Illinois ==
1962 United States Senate election in Illinois
- Turnout: 72.66%
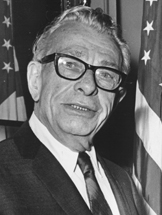

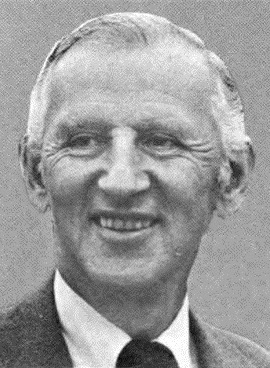
Nominee	Everett Dirksen	Sidney R. Yates
Party	Republican	Democratic
Popular vote	1,961,202	1,748,007
Percentage	52.87%	47.13%
- County results Dirksen: 50-60% 60-70% 70-80% Yates: 50–60% 60–70%
U.S. senator before election
Everett Dirksen
Republican
Elected U.S. Senator
Everett Dirksen
Republican

Illinois general election
Party	Candidate	Votes	%
Republican	Everett Dirksen (incumbent)	1,961,202	52.87
Democratic	Sidney R. Yates	1,748,007	47.13
Majority		213,195	5.74
Turnout		3,709,209	
Republican hold			

== Indiana ==
1962 United States Senate election in Indiana
- November 6, 1962
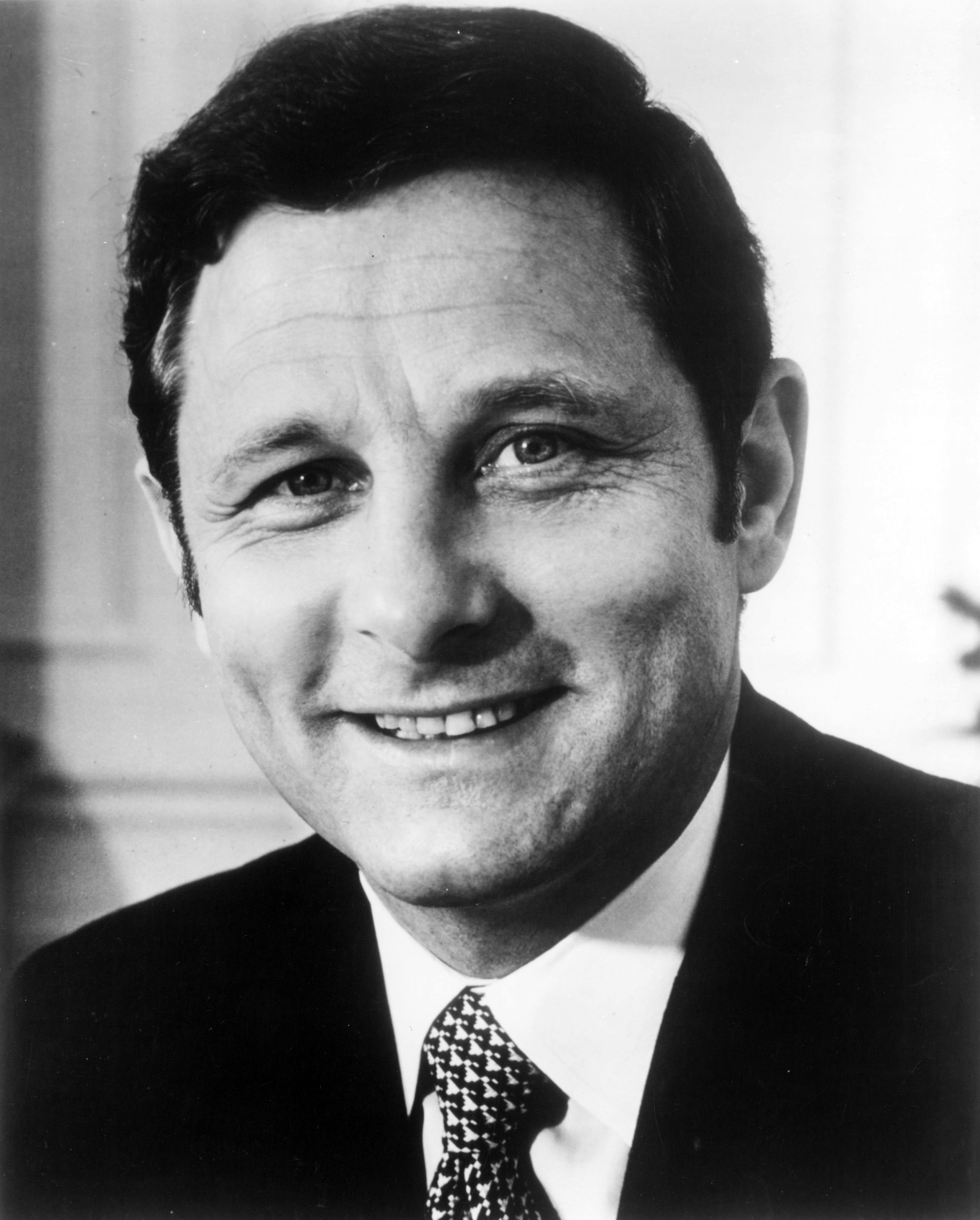

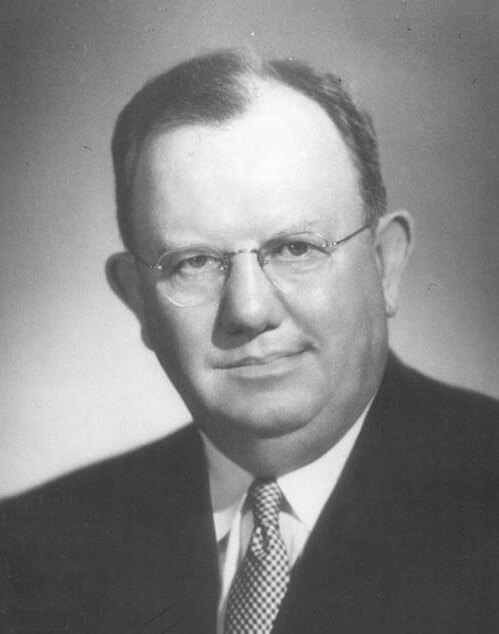
Nominee	Birch Bayh	Homer Capehart
Party	Democratic	Republican
Popular vote	905,491	894,547
Percentage	50.30%	49.70%
- County results Bayh: 50–60% 60–70% Capehart: 50–60% 60–70%
U.S. senator before election
Homer Capehart
Republican
Elected U.S. Senator
Birch Bayh
Democratic

Indiana general election
Party	Candidate	Votes	%
Democratic	Birch Bayh	905,491	50.30
Republican	Homer E. Capehart (incumbent)	894,547	49.70
Majority		10,944	0.60
Turnout		1,800,038	
Democratic gain from Republican			

== Iowa ==
1962 United States Senate election in Iowa
- November 6, 1962
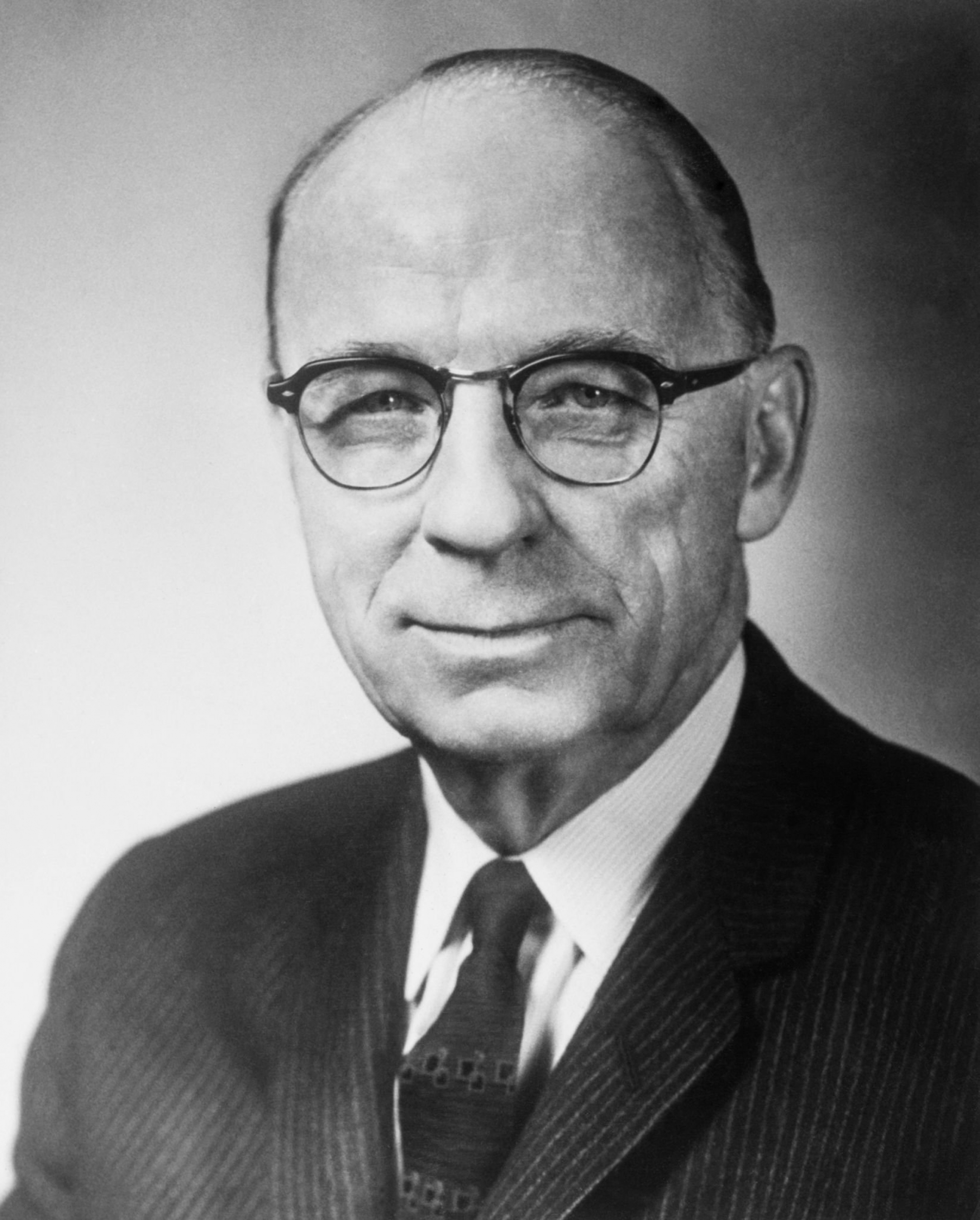

Nominee	Bourke B. Hickenlooper	E.B. Smith
Party	Republican	Democratic
Popular vote	431,364	376,602
Percentage	53.39%	46.61%
- County results Hickenlooper: 50-60% 60-70% 70-80% Smith: 50–60% 60–70% Tie: 40–50%
U.S. senator before election
Bourke B. Hickenlooper
Republican
Elected U.S. Senator
Bourke B. Hickenlooper
Republican

Iowa general election
Party	Candidate	Votes	%
Republican	Bourke B. Hickenlooper (incumbent)	431,364	53.39
Democratic	E. B. Smith	376,602	46.61
None	Scattering	6	0.00
Majority		54,762	6.78
Turnout		807,972	
Republican hold			

== Kansas ==
=== Kansas (regular) ===
1962 United States Senate election in Kansas
- November 6, 1962
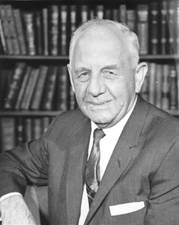

Nominee	Frank Carlson	K.L. Smith
Party	Republican	Democratic
Popular vote	388,500	223,630
Percentage	62.44%	35.94%
- County results Carlson: 50–60% 60–70% 70–80% Smith: 50–60%
U.S. senator before election
Frank Carlson
Republican
Elected U.S. Senator
Frank Carlson
Republican

Kansas general election
Party	Candidate	Votes	%
Republican	Frank Carlson (incumbent)	388,500	62.44
Democratic	K. L. (Ken) Smith	223,630	35.94
Prohibition	George E. Kline	10,098	1.62
Majority		164,870	26.50
Turnout		622,228	
Republican hold			

=== Kansas (special) ===
1962 United States Senate special election in Kansas
- November 6, 1962
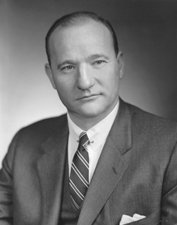

Nominee	James B. Pearson	Paul L. Aylward
Party	Republican	Democratic
Popular vote	344,689	260,756
Percentage	56.21%	42.52%
- County results Pearson: 50–60% 60–70% 70–80% Aylward: 40–50% 50–60% 60–70%
U.S. senator before election
James B. Pearson
Republican
Elected U.S. Senator
James B. Pearson
Republican

Kansas special general election
Party	Candidate	Votes	%
Republican	James B. Pearson (incumbent)	344,689	56.21
Democratic	Paul L. Aylward	260,756	42.52
Prohibition	C.E. Cowen	7,804	1.27
Majority		83,933	13.69
Turnout		613,249	
Republican hold			

== Kentucky ==
1962 United States Senate election in Kentucky
- November 6, 1962
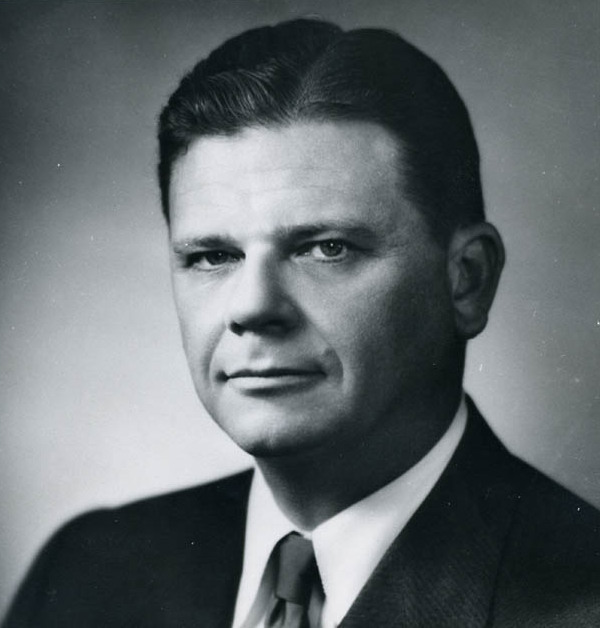

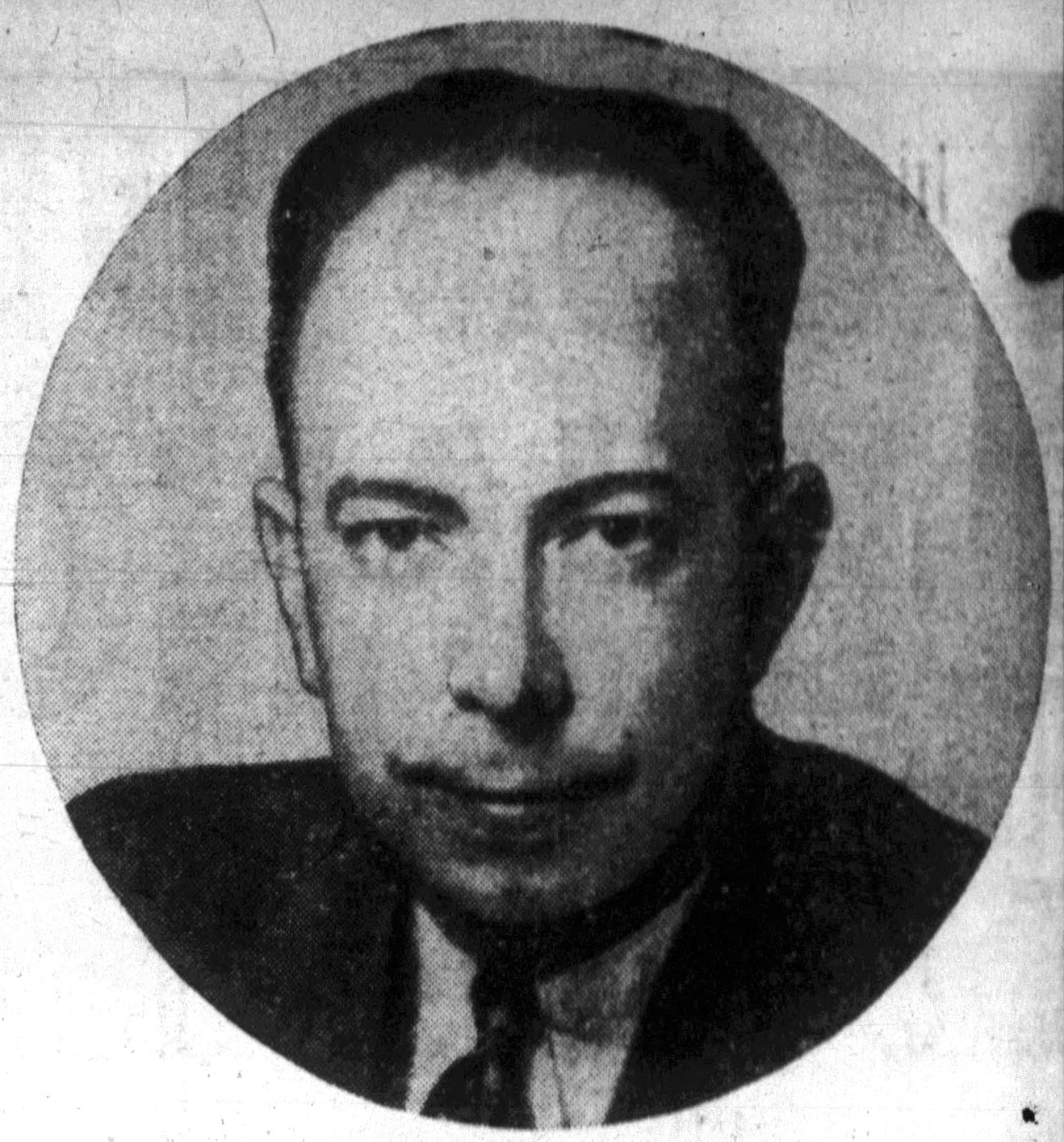
Nominee	Thruston Ballard Morton	Wilson W. Wyatt
Party	Republican	Democratic
Popular vote	432,648	387,440
Percentage	52.76%	47.24%
- County results Morton: 50-60% 60-70% 70-80% 80–90% Wyatt: 50–60% 60–70% 70–80%
U.S. senator before election
Thruston Ballard Morton
Republican
Elected U.S. Senator
Thruston Ballard Morton
Republican

Kentucky general election
Party	Candidate	Votes	%
Republican	Thruston B. Morton (incumbent)	432,648	52.76
Democratic	Wilson W. Wyatt	387,440	47.24
Majority		45,208	5.52
Turnout		820,088	
Republican hold			

== Louisiana ==
1962 United States Senate election in Louisiana
- November 6, 1962
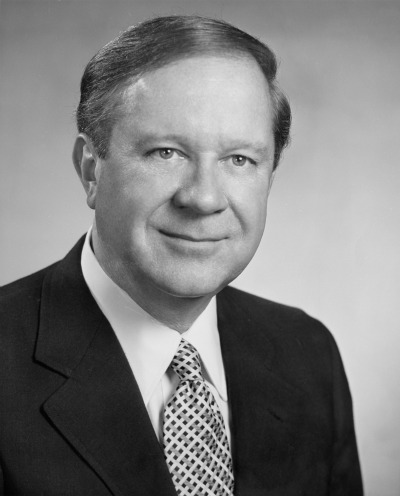

Nominee	Russell B. Long	Taylor W. O'Hearn
Party	Democratic	Republican
Popular vote	318,838	103,666
Percentage	75.46%	24.54%
- Parish results Long: 50–60% 60–70% 70–80% 80–90% >90% Maloney: 50-60% 60-70%
U.S. senator before election
Russell Long
Democratic
Elected U.S. Senator
Russell Long
Democratic

Louisiana general election
Party	Candidate	Votes	%
Democratic	Russell B. Long (incumbent)	318,838	75.57
Republican	Taylor Walters O'Hearn	103,066	24.43
Majority		215,772	51.14
Turnout		421,904	
Democratic hold			

== Maryland ==
1962 United States Senate election in Maryland
- November 6, 1962
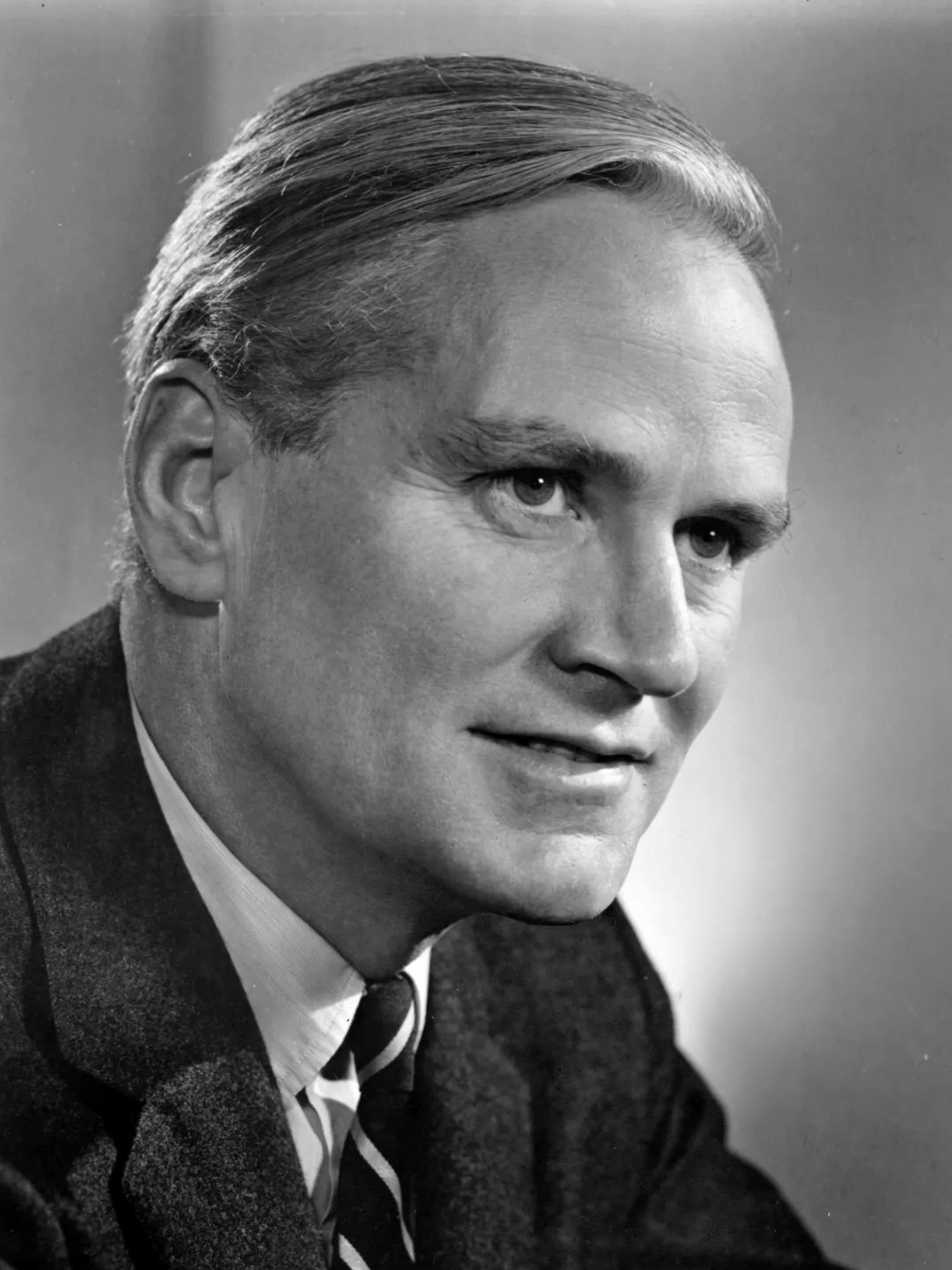

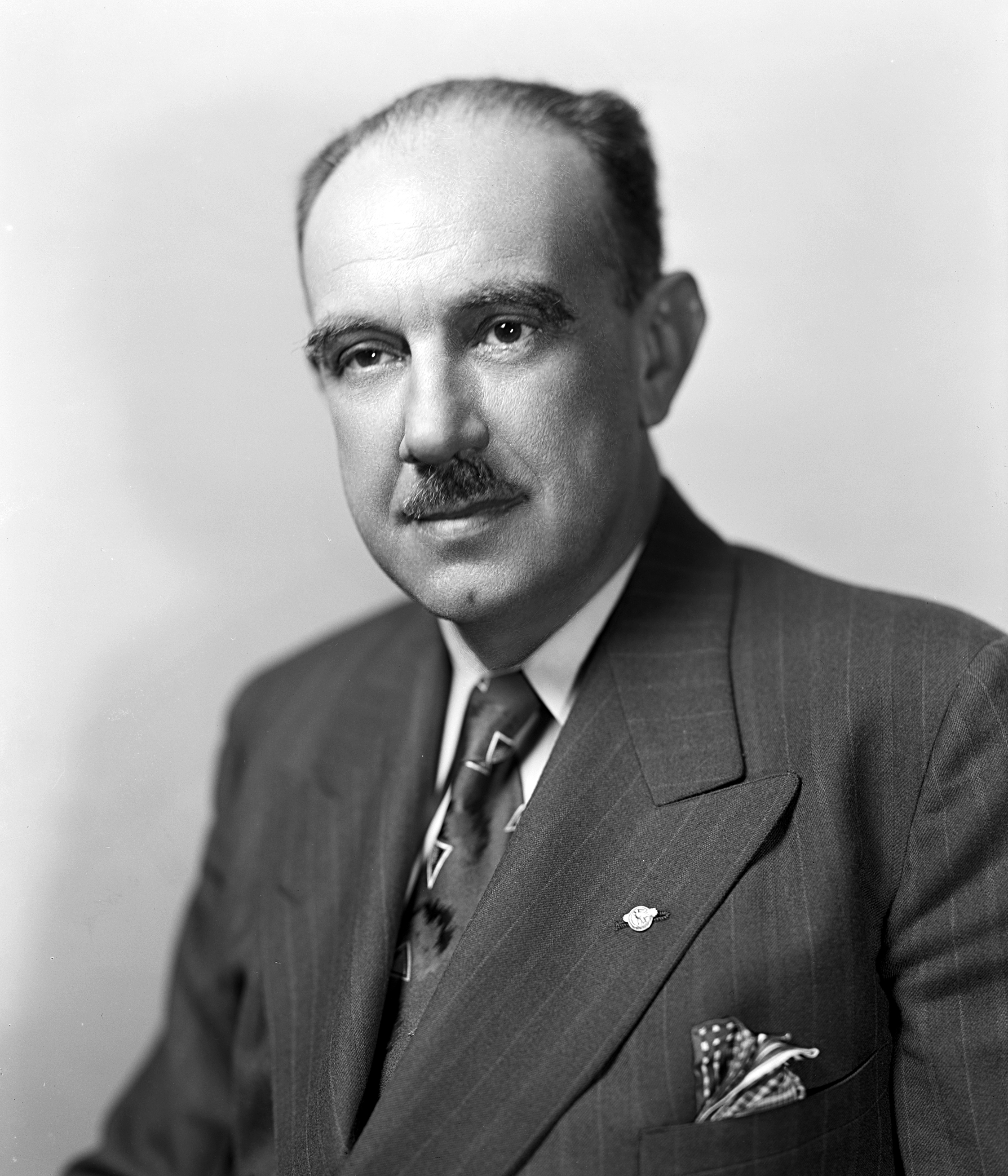
Nominee	Daniel Brewster	Edward Tylor Miller
Party	Democratic	Republican
Popular vote	439,723	269,131
Percentage	62.03%	37.97%
- County results Brewster: 50–60% 60–70% 70–80% Miller: 50–60% 60–70%
U.S. senator before election
John Marshall Butler
Republican
Elected U.S. Senator
Daniel Brewster
Democratic

Maryland general election
Party	Candidate	Votes	%
Democratic	Daniel B. Brewster	439,723	62.03
Republican	Edward Tylor Miller	269,131	37.97
None	Scattering	1	0.00
Majority		170,592	24.06
Turnout		708,855	
Democratic gain from Republican			

== Massachusetts (special) ==
1962 United States Senate special election in Massachusetts
- November 6, 1962
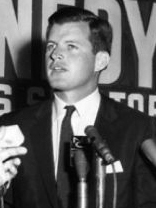

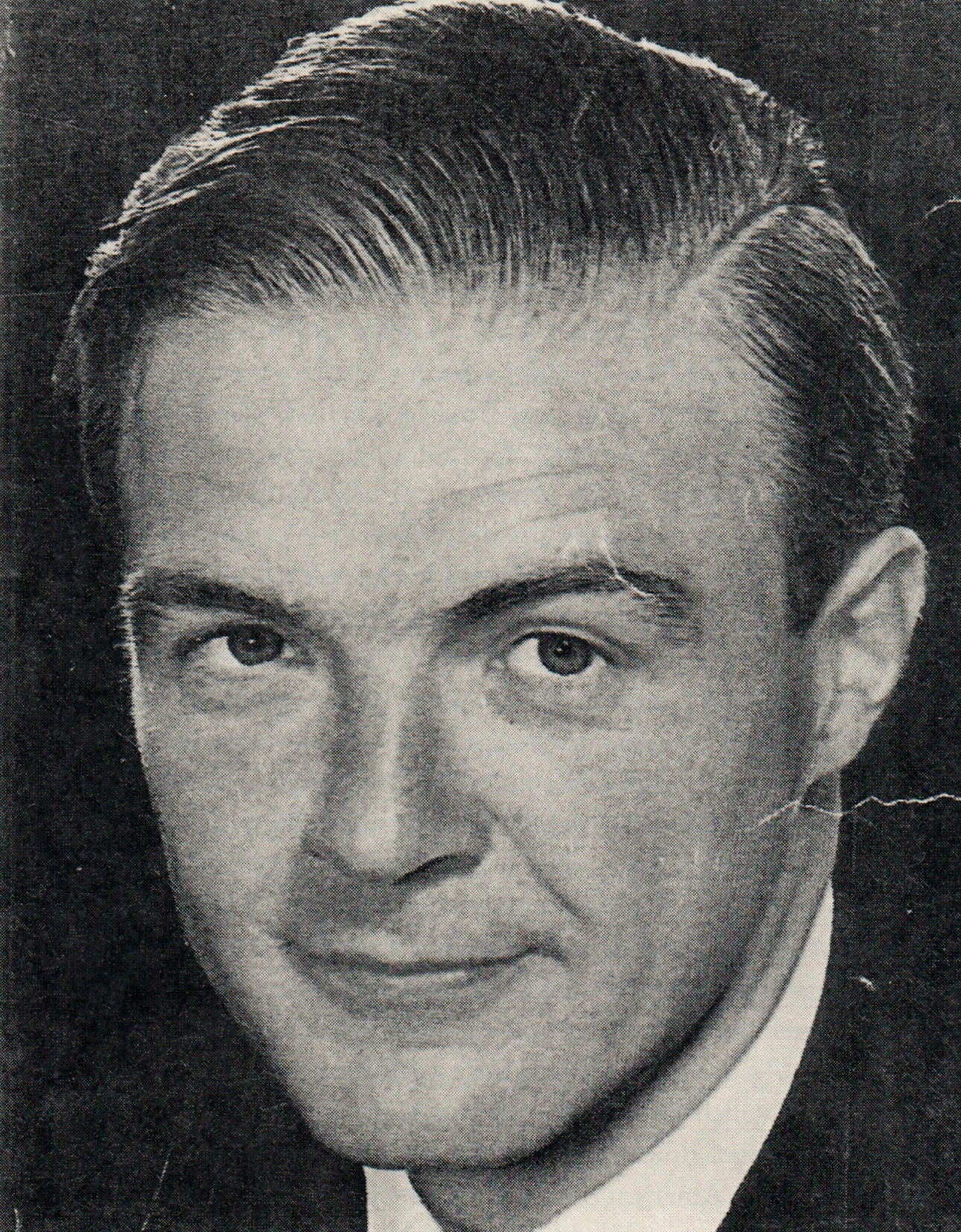
Nominee	Ted Kennedy	George C. Lodge
Party	Democratic	Republican
Popular vote	1,162,611	877,668
Percentage	55.44%	41.85%
- Kennedy: 40–50% 50–60% 60–70% 70–80% Lodge: 40–50% 50–60% 60–70% 70–80% 80–90%
U.S. senator before election
Benjamin A. Smith II
Democratic
Elected U.S. Senator
Ted Kennedy
Democratic

Massachusetts special election
Party	Candidate	Votes	%	±%
Democratic	Ted Kennedy	1,162,611	55.44	−17.76%
Republican	George C. Lodge	877,668	41.85	+15.62%
Independent	H. Stuart Hughes	50,013	2.38	N/A
Socialist Labor	Lawrence Gilfedder	5,330	0.25	−0.04%
Prohibition	Mark R. Shaw	1,439	0.07	−0.22%
Total votes		2,097,061	100.00%	
Democratic hold				

John F. Kennedy, originally elected to the U.S. Senate in 1952 United States Senate election in Massachusetts, resigned in 1961 after being elected in the 1960 United States presidential election. Incumbent Benjamin A. Smith II chose not to run for re-election. Ted Kennedy, brother of John and Attorney General Robert F. Kennedy, defeated Edward J. McCormack, Jr. by a wide margin in the Democratic primary. In the Republican primary, U.S. Assistant Secretary of Labor for International Affairs George C. Lodge defeated U.S. representative Laurence Curtis in a close race.

In a battle between two candidates from influential political families, H. Stuart Hughes ran as an independent. Ted Kennedy defeated Lodge with 55% of the vote to 42% for Lodge, with 2% to Hughes. Kennedy would serve until 2009.

== Missouri ==
1962 United States Senate election in Missouri
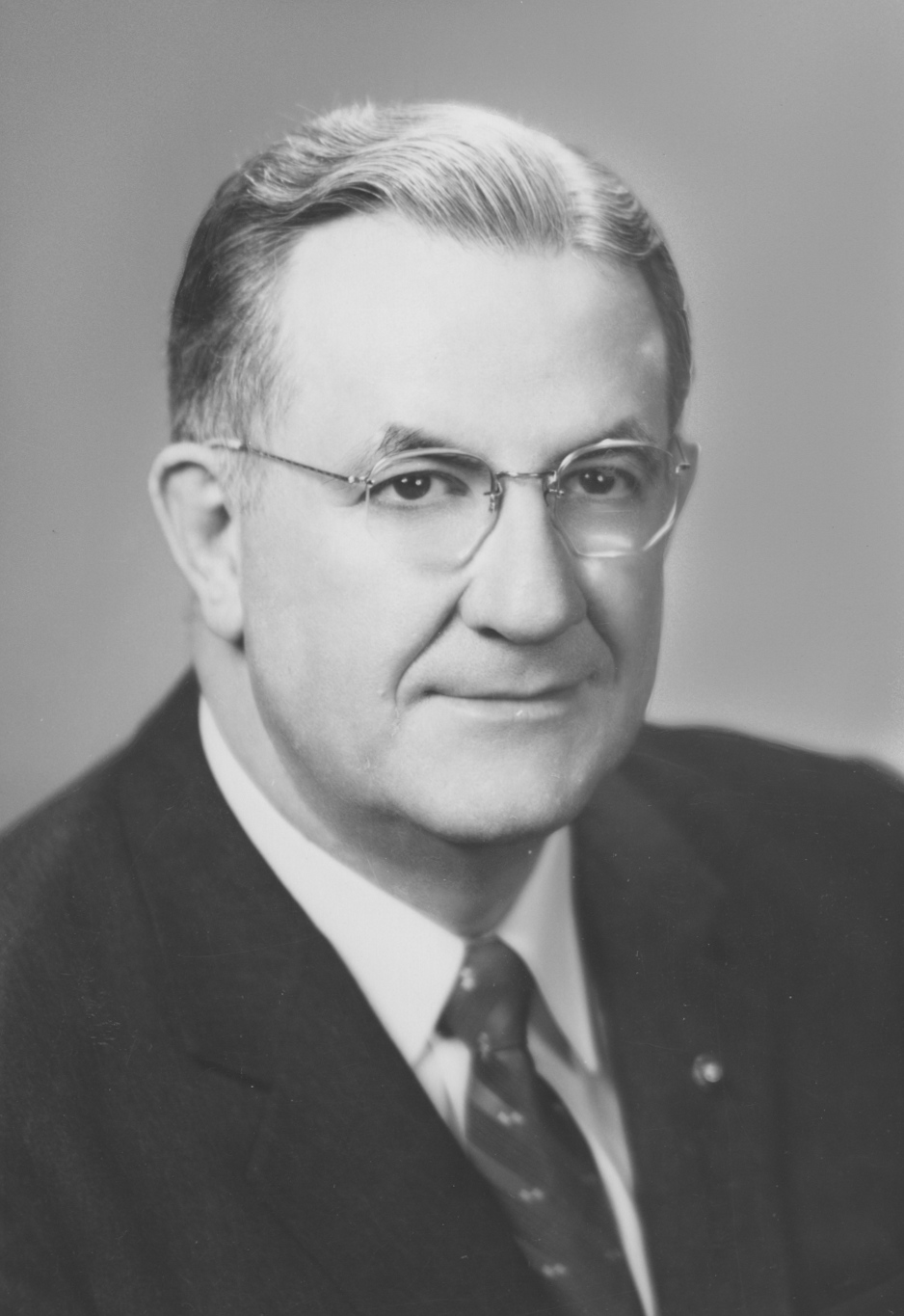
Nominee	Edward V. Long	R. Crosby Kemper Jr.
Party	Democratic	Republican
Popular vote	663,301	555,330
Percentage	54.43%	45.57%
- County results Long: 50–60% 60–70% 70–80% 80–90% Kemper: 50–60% 60–70% 70–80%
U.S. senator before election
Edward V. Long
Democratic
Elected U.S. senator
Edward V. Long
Democratic

Missouri general election
Party	Candidate	Votes	%
Democratic	Edward V. Long (incumbent)	663,301	54.43
Republican	Crosby Kemper	555,330	45.57
Majority		107,971	8.86
Turnout		1,218,631	
Democratic hold			

== Nevada ==
1962 United States Senate election in Nevada
- November 6, 1962
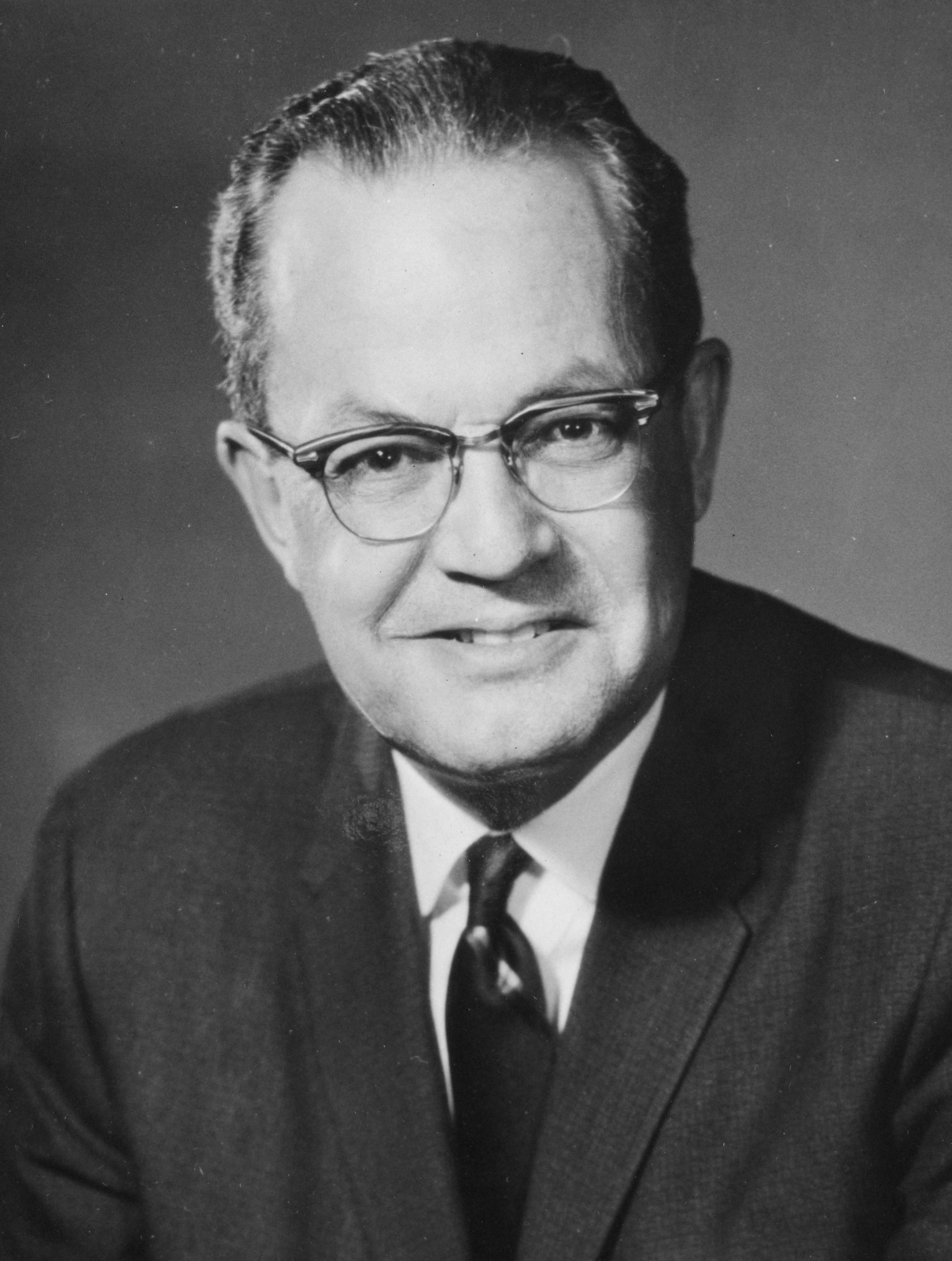

Nominee	Alan Bible	William B. Wright
Party	Democratic	Republican
Popular vote	63,443	33,749
Percentage	65.3%	34.7%
- County results Bible: 50–60% 60–70% 70–80% Wright: 50–60%
U.S. senator before election
Alan Bible
Democratic
Elected U.S. Senator
Alan Bible
Democratic

Nevada general election
Party	Candidate	Votes	%
Democratic	Alan Bible (incumbent)	63,443	65.28
Republican	William B. Wright	33,749	34.72
Majority		29,694	30.56
Turnout		97,192	
Democratic hold			

== New Hampshire ==
=== New Hampshire (regular) ===
1962 United States Senate election in New Hampshire
- November 6, 1962
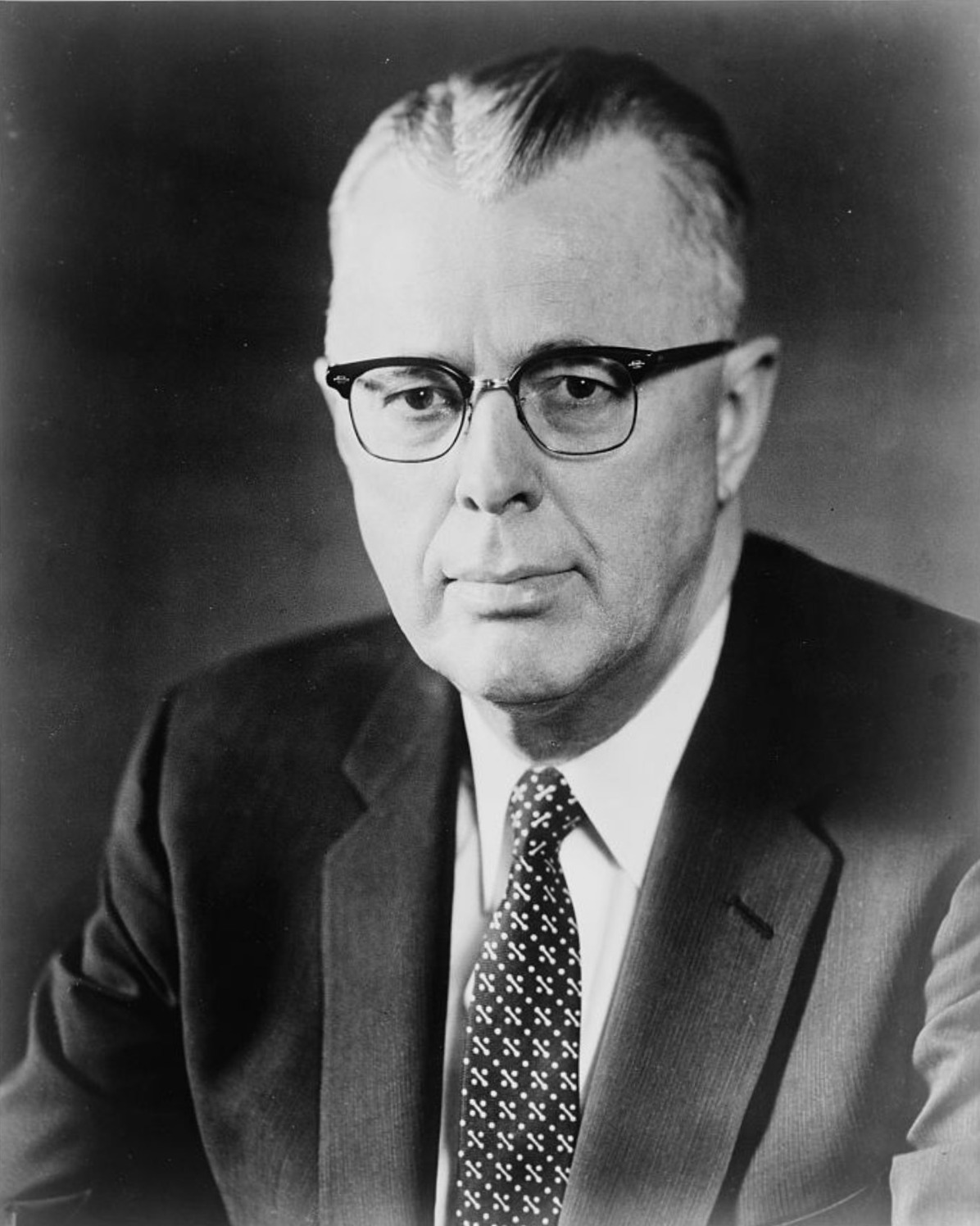

Nominee	Norris Cotton	Alfred Catalfo Jr.
Party	Republican	Democratic
Popular vote	134,035	90,444
Percentage	59.71%	40.29%
- Cotton: 50–60% 60–70% 70–80% 80–90% 90-100% Catalfo: 50–60% 60–70% 70–80%
U.S. senator before election
Norris Cotton
Republican
Elected U.S. Senator
Norris Cotton
Republican

New Hampshire general election
Party	Candidate	Votes	%
Republican	Norris Cotton (incumbent)	134,035	59.71
Democratic	Alfred Catalfo Jr.	90,444	40.29
Majority		43,591	19.42
Turnout		224,479	
Republican hold			

=== New Hampshire (special) ===
1962 United States Senate special election in New Hampshire
- November 6, 1962
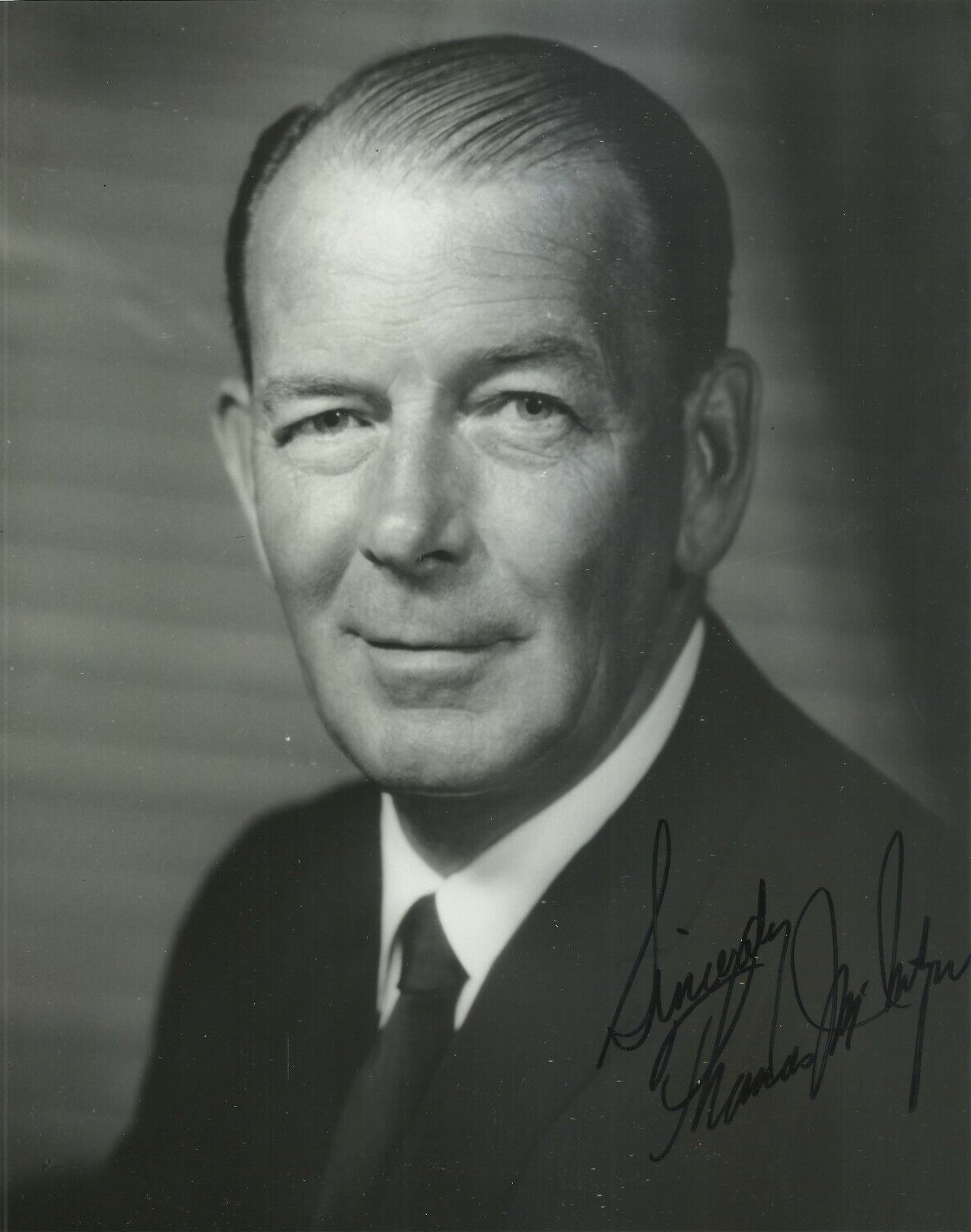

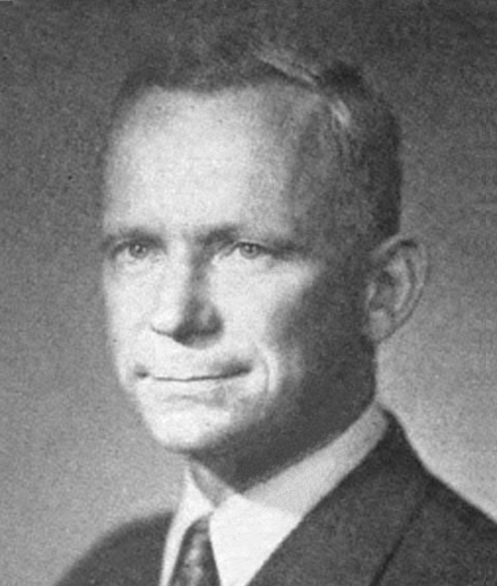
Nominee	Thomas J. McIntyre	Perkins Bass
Party	Democratic	Republican
Popular vote	117,612	107,199
Percentage	52.32%	47.68%
- McIntyre: 50–60% 60–70% 70–80% 80–90% Bass: 50–60% 60–70% 70–80% 80–90% 90-100%
U.S. senator before election
Maurice J. Murphy Jr.
Republican
Elected U.S. Senator
Thomas J. McIntyre
Democratic

1962 United States Senate special election in New Hampshire
Party	Candidate	Votes	%
Democratic	Thomas J. McIntyre	117,612	52.32
Republican	Perkins Bass	107,199	47.68
Majority		10,413	4.64
Turnout		224,811	
Democratic gain from Republican			

== New York ==
1962 United States Senate election in New York
- November 6, 1962
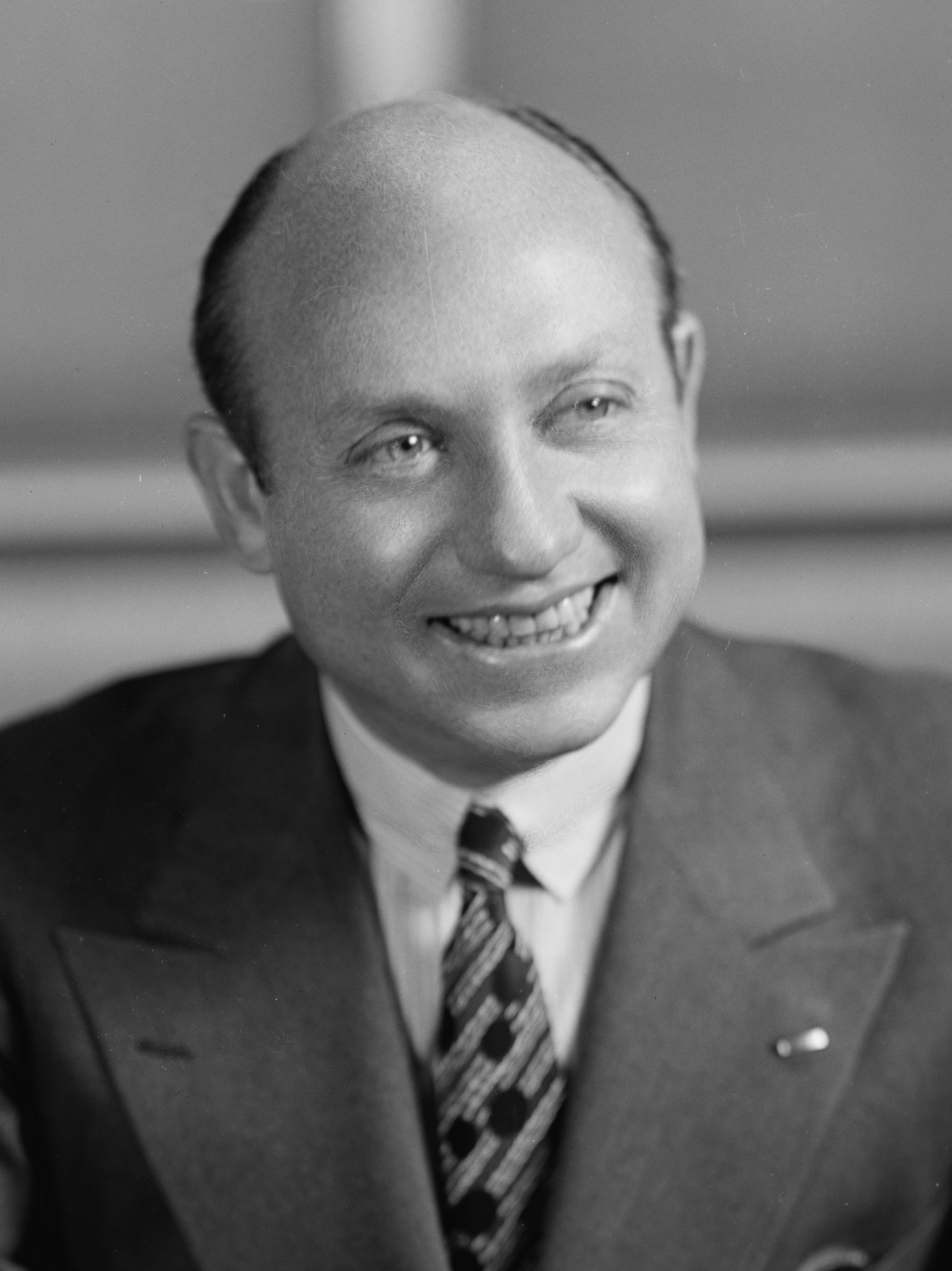

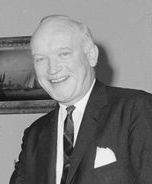
Nominee	Jacob Javits	James B. Donovan
Party	Republican	Democratic
Alliance		Liberal
Popular vote	3,272,417	2,289,323
Percentage	57.38%	40.14%
- County results Javits: 40–50% 50–60% 60–70% 70–80% Donovan: 50–60%
U.S. senator before election
Jacob K. Javits
Republican
Elected U.S. Senator
Jacob K. Javits
Republican

New York general election
Party	Candidate	Votes	%
Republican	Jacob Javits (incumbent)	3,272,417	57.38
Democratic	James B. Donovan	2,289,323	40.14
Constitution	Kieran O’Dougherty	116,151	2.04
Socialist Workers	Carl Feingold	17,440	0.31
Socialist Labor	Stephen Emery	7,786	0.14
Majority		983,094	17.24
Turnout		5,703,117	
Republican hold			

== North Carolina ==
1962 United States Senate election in North Carolina
- November 6, 1962
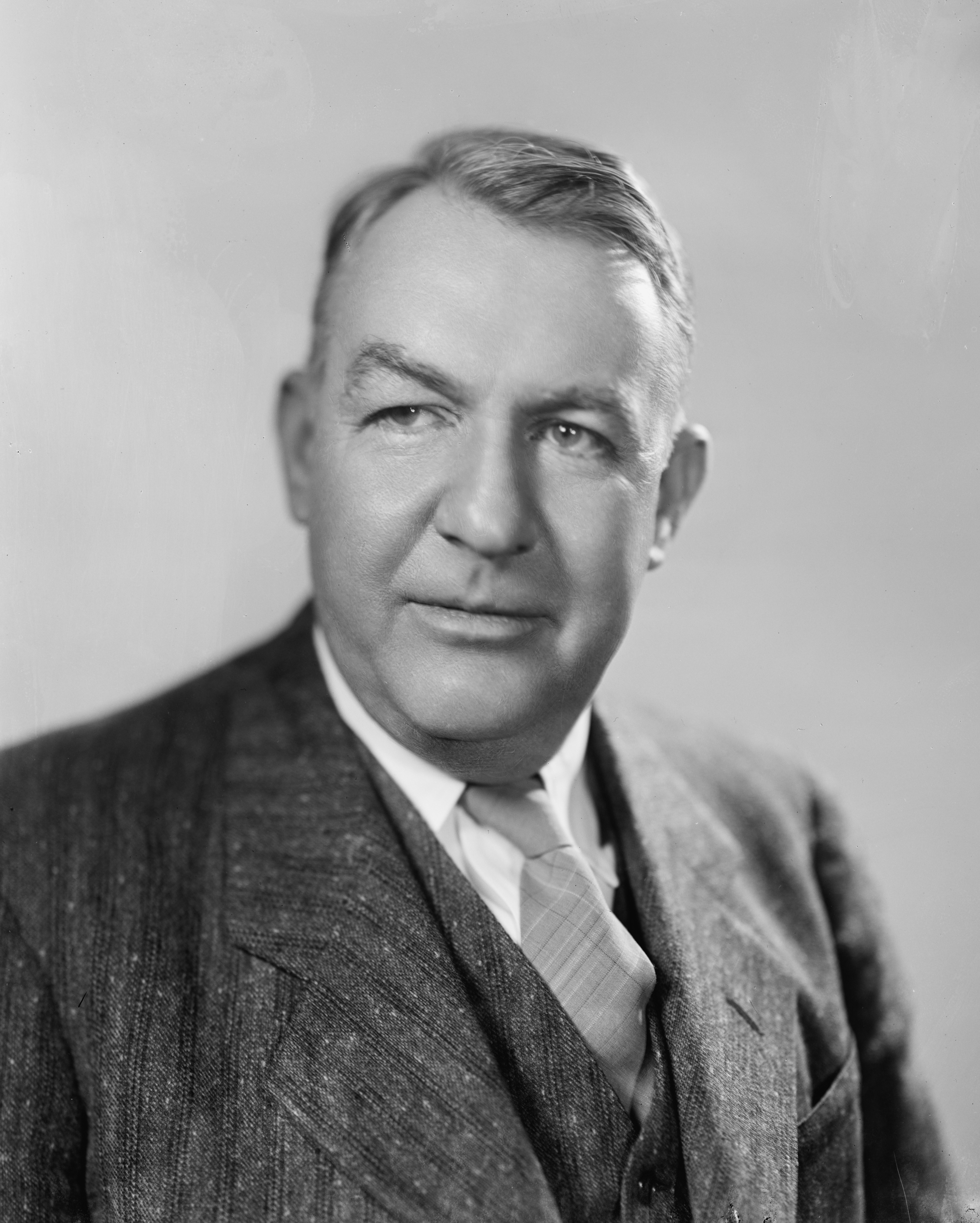

Nominee	Sam Ervin	Claude Greene
Party	Democratic	Republican
Popular vote	491,520	321,635
Percentage	60.45%	39.55%
- County results Ervin: 50–60% 60–70% 70–80% 80–90% >90% Greene: 50-60% 60-70%
Senator before election
Sam Ervin
Democratic
Elected Senator
Sam Ervin
Democratic

North Carolina general election
Party	Candidate	Votes	%
Democratic	Sam Ervin (incumbent)	491,520	60.45
Republican	Claude L. Greene Jr.	321,635	39.55
Majority		169,885	20.90
Turnout		813,155	
Democratic hold			

== North Dakota ==
1962 United States Senate election in North Dakota
- November 6, 1962
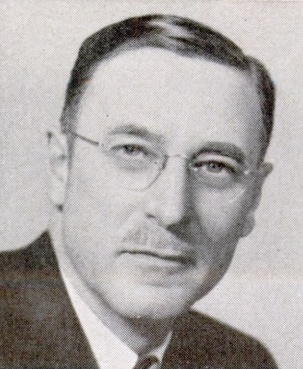

Nominee	Milton Young	William Lanier
Party	Republican	Democratic–NPL
Popular vote	135,705	88,032
Percentage	60.65%	39.35%
- County results Young: 50–60% 60–70% 70–80% Lanier: 50–60%
Senator before election
Milton Young
Republican
Elected Senator
Milton Young
Republican

Incumbent Republican Milton Young was re-elected to his fourth term, defeating North Dakota Democratic-NPL Party candidate William Lanier of Fargo. Only Young filed as a Republican, and the endorsed Democratic candidate was Lanier, who had previously faced Young in a special election held in 1946 to fill the seat which was vacated by the late John Moses. Young and Lanier won the primary elections for their respective parties. No independents ran.

North Dakota Senate election
Party	Candidate	Votes	%
Republican	Milton R. Young (incumbent)	135,705	60.65
Democratic–NPL	William Lanier	88,032	39.35
Majority		47,673	21.30
Turnout		223,737	
Republican hold			

== Ohio ==
1962 United States Senate election in Ohio
- November 6, 1962
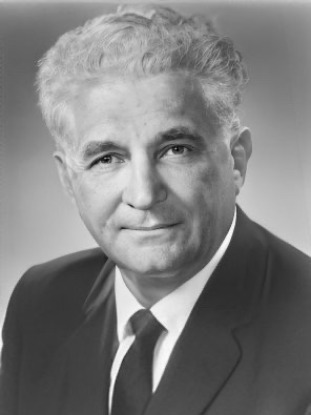

Nominee	Frank Lausche	John M. Briley
Party	Democratic	Republican
Popular vote	1,843,813	1,151,173
Percentage	61.56%	38.44%
- County results Lausche: 50–60% 60–70% 70–80% Briley: 50–60%
U.S. senator before election
Frank J. Lausche
Democratic
Elected U.S. Senator
Frank J. Lausche
Democratic

Ohio general election
Party	Candidate	Votes	%
Democratic	Frank J. Lausche (incumbent)	1,843,813	61.56
Republican	John Marshall Briley	1,151,173	38.44
Majority		692,640	23.12
Turnout		2,994,986	
Democratic hold			

== Oklahoma ==
1962 United States Senate election in Oklahoma
- November 6, 1962
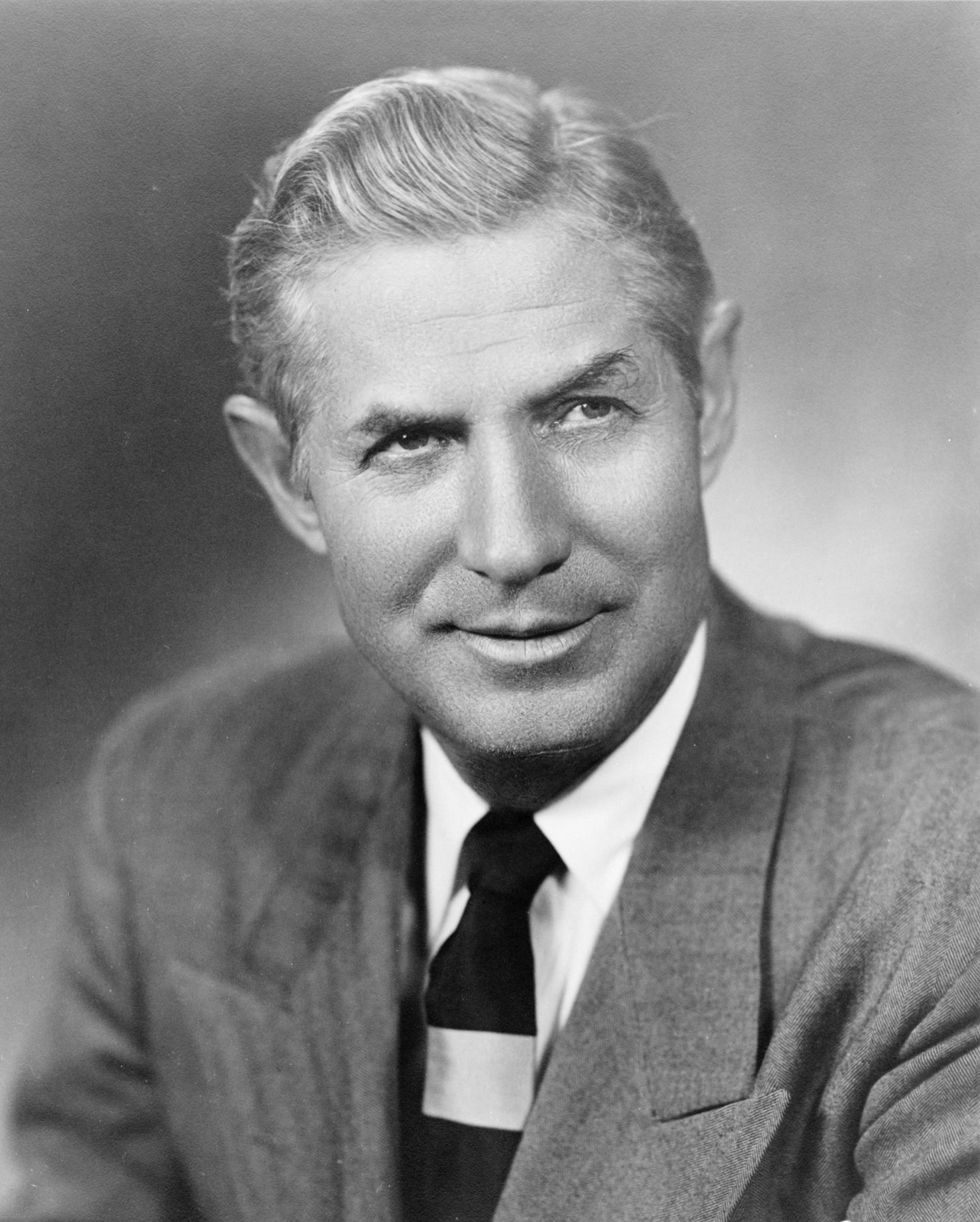

Nominee	Mike Monroney	B. Hayden Crawford
Party	Democratic	Republican
Popular vote	353,890	307,966
Percentage	53.24%	46.33%
- County results Monroney: 50–60% 60–70% 70–80% Crawford: 40–50% 50–60% 60–70% 70–80%
U.S. senator before election
Mike Monroney
Democratic
Elected U.S. Senator
Mike Monroney
Democratic

Oklahoma general election
Party	Candidate	Votes	%
Democratic	A. S. Mike Monroney (incumbent)	353,890	53.24
Republican	B. Hayden Crawford	307,966	46.33
Independent	Paul V. Beck	2,856	0.43
Majority		45,924	6.91
Turnout		664,712	
Democratic hold			

== Oregon ==
1962 United States Senate election in Oregon
- November 8, 1962
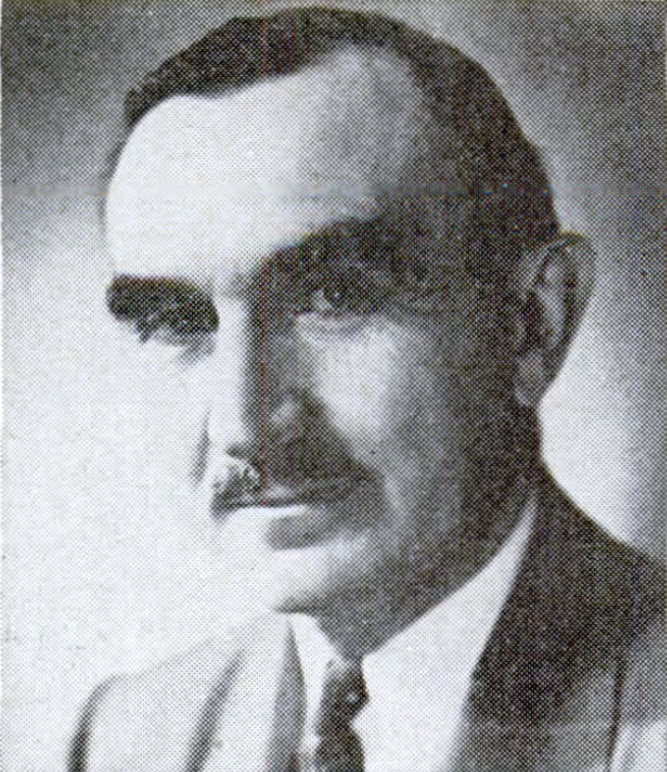

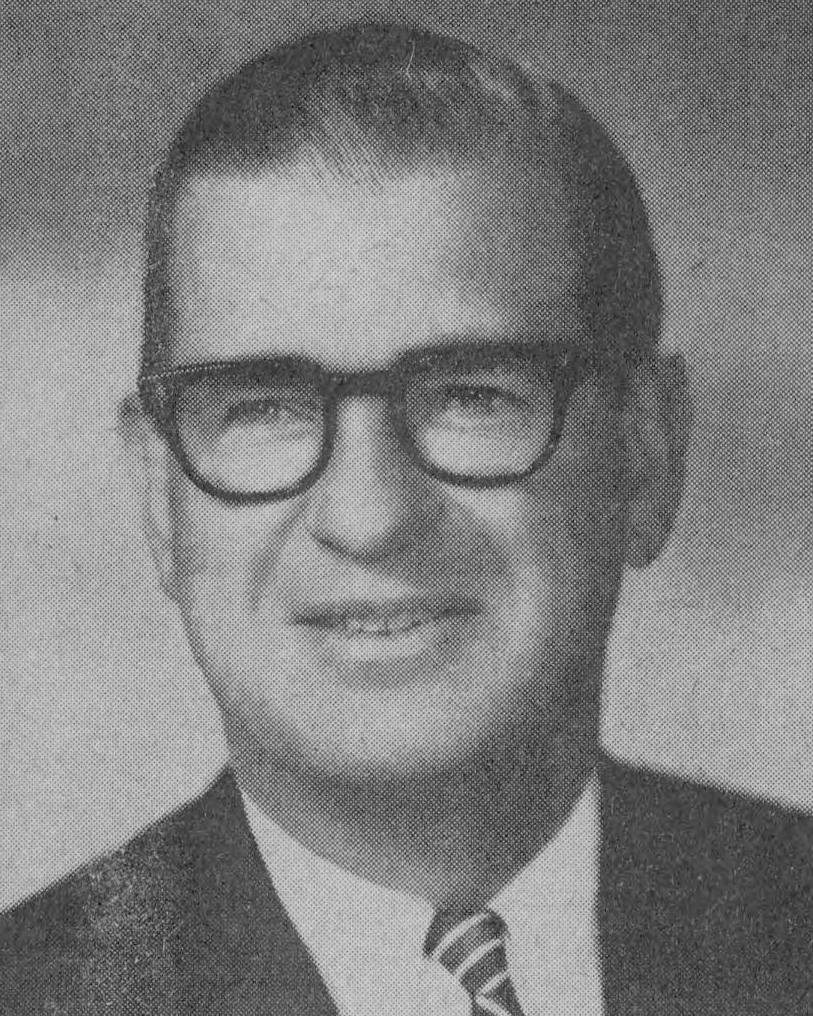
Nominee	Wayne Morse	Sig Unander
Party	Democratic	Republican
Popular vote	344,716	291,587
Percentage	54.15%	45.81%
- County results Morse: 50–60% 60–70% Unander: 50–60% 60–70%
U.S. senator before election
Wayne Morse
Democratic
Elected U.S. Senator
Wayne Morse
Democratic

Democratic incumbent Wayne Morse was re-elected to a fourth term. He defeated Republican candidate Sig Unander in the general election.

1962 United States Senate election in Oregon
Party	Candidate	Votes	%
Democratic	Wayne Morse (incumbent)	344,716	54.15%
Republican	Sig Unander	291,587	45.81%
Write-in	write-ins	253	0.04%
Majority		53,129	8.34%
Total votes		636,556	100.00%
Democratic hold			

== Pennsylvania ==
1962 United States Senate election in Pennsylvania
- November 6, 1962
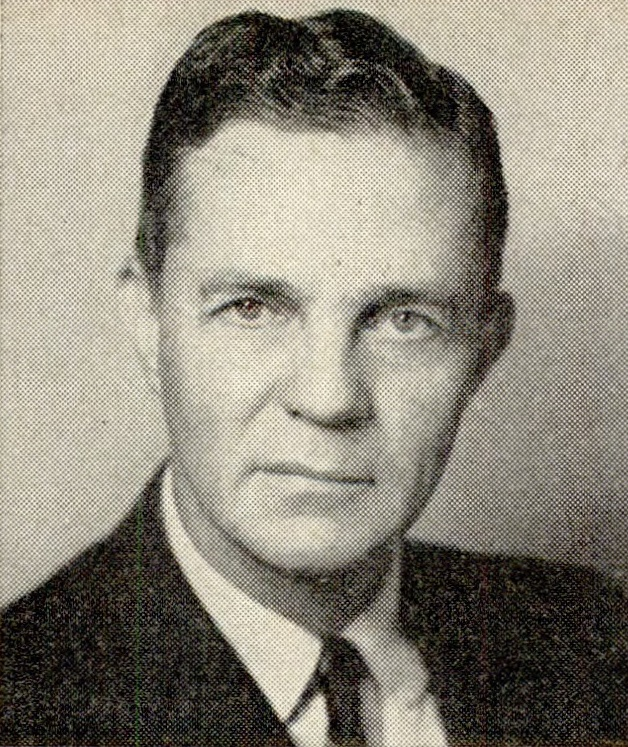

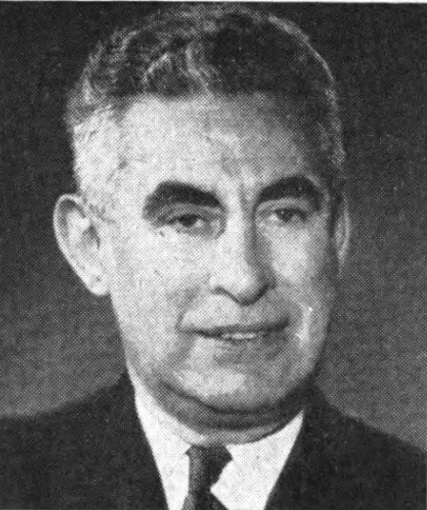
Nominee	Joseph S. Clark Jr.	James E. Van Zandt
Party	Democratic	Republican
Popular vote	2,238,383	2,134,649
Percentage	51.07%	48.70%
- County results Clark: 40–50% 50–60% 60–70% Zandt: 50–60% 60–70% 70–80%
U.S. senator before election
Joseph S. Clark, Jr.
Democratic
Elected U.S. Senator
Joseph S. Clark, Jr.
Democratic

Pennsylvania general election
Party	Candidate	Votes	%
Democratic	Joseph S. Clark (incumbent)	2,238,383	51.06
Republican	James E. Van Zandt	2,134,649	48.70
Socialist Labor	Arla A. Aubaugh	10,387	0.24
Majority		103,734	2.36
Turnout		4,383,419	
Democratic hold			

== South Carolina ==
1962 United States Senate election in South Carolina
- November 6, 1962
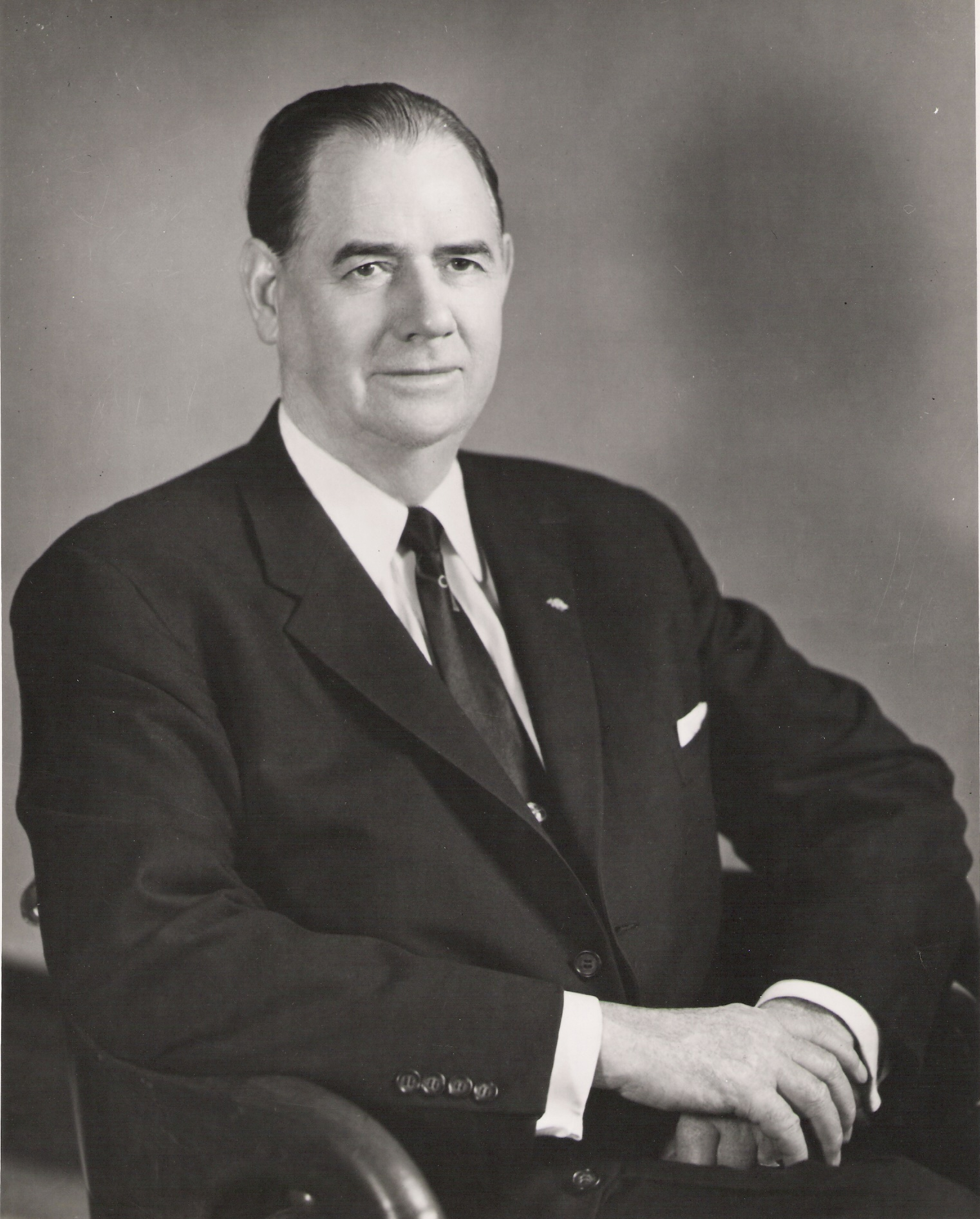

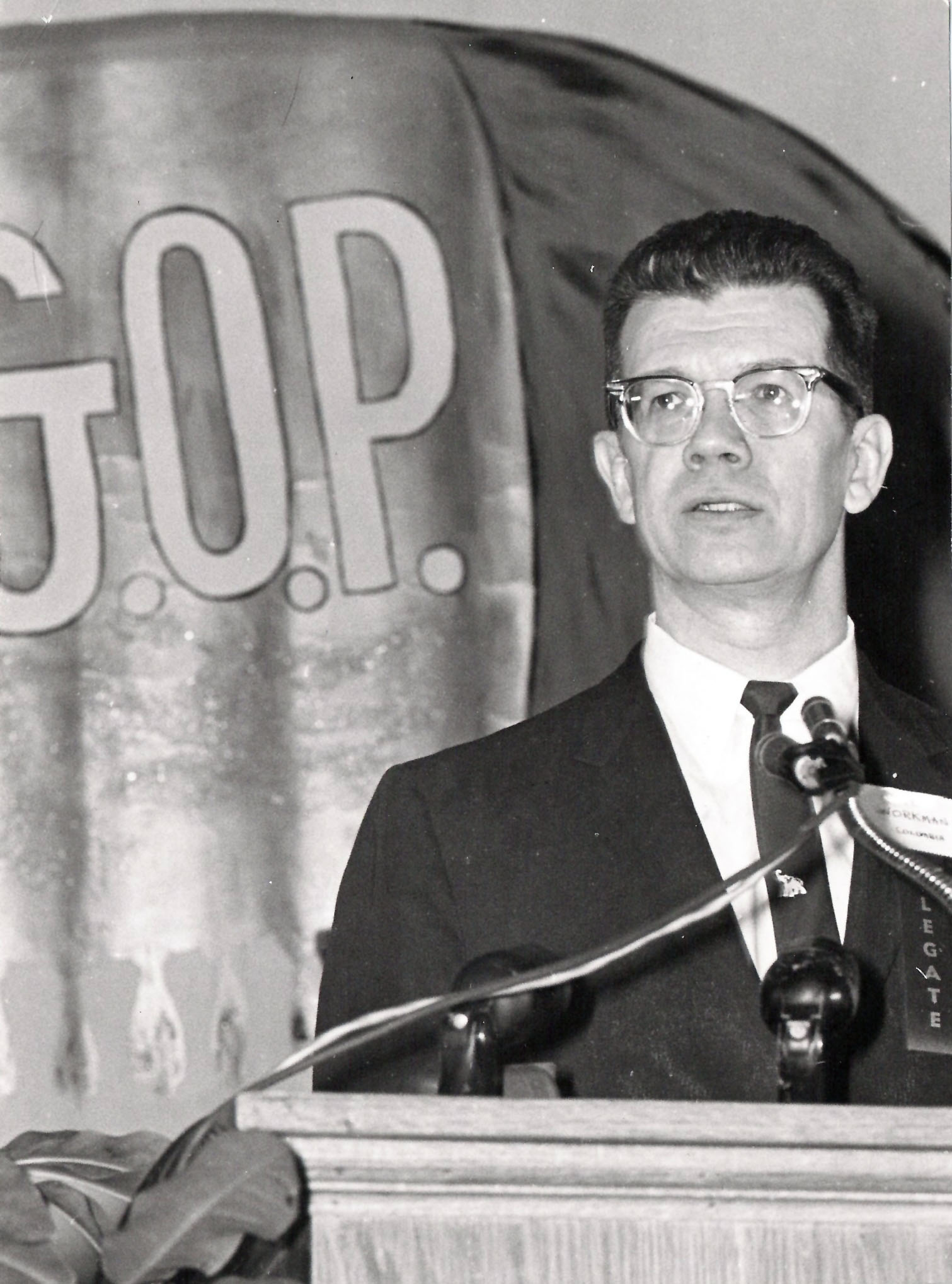
Nominee	Olin D. Johnston	W. D. Workman Jr.
Party	Democratic	Republican
Popular vote	178,712	133,930
Percentage	57.16%	42.84%
- County results Johnston: 50–60% 60–70% 70–80% 80–90% Workman: 50-60%
U.S. senator before election
Olin D. Johnston
Democratic
Elected U.S. Senator
Olin D. Johnston
Democratic

Incumbent Democratic Senator Olin D. Johnston defeated Governor Fritz Hollings in the Democratic primary and Republican W. D. Workman Jr. in the general election. The South Carolina Democratic Party held their primary on June 12, 1962. Olin D. Johnston, the incumbent senator, faced stiff competition from Governor Fritz Hollings, who argued that Johnston was too liberal and not representative of South Carolina interests. Johnston told the voters that he was doing what he thought was best for the agriculture and textile workers of the state. Hollings was decisively defeated by Johnston because Johnston used his position as Post Office and Civil Service Committee to build 40 new post offices in the state and thus demonstrate the pull he had in Washington.

Democratic primary
Party	Candidate	Votes	%
Democratic	Olin D. Johnston (incumbent)	216,918	66.3
Democratic	Fritz Hollings	110,023	33.7

W. D. Workman Jr., a correspondent for the News and Courier, faced no opposition from South Carolina Republicans and avoided a primary election.

Both Johnston and Workman supported segregation, so the campaign centered on the economic issues of the state. Workman tried to persuade the voters that Johnston's policies were socialist and that he was too closely aligned with the Kennedy administration. Johnston was a consistent supporter of socialized health care proposals, and Workman was able to win considerable support from the medical establishment. However, the state's citizens were much poorer than those of the rest of the nation, and Johnston's class based appeals made him a very popular figure for the downtrodden of both the white and black races. The competitive nature of this race foretold the eventual rise of the Republican Party and the fact that South Carolinians were growing increasingly suspicious of policies generated at the federal level.

South Carolina U.S. Senate election, 1962
Party	Candidate	Votes	%	±%
Democratic	Olin D. Johnston (incumbent)	178,712	57.2	−25.0
Republican	W. D. Workman Jr.	133,930	42.8	+25.0
No party	Write-Ins	5	0.0	0.0
Majority		44,782	14.4	−50.0
Turnout		312,647	46.9	+8.8
Democratic hold		Swing		

== South Dakota ==
1962 United States Senate election in South Dakota
- November 6, 1962
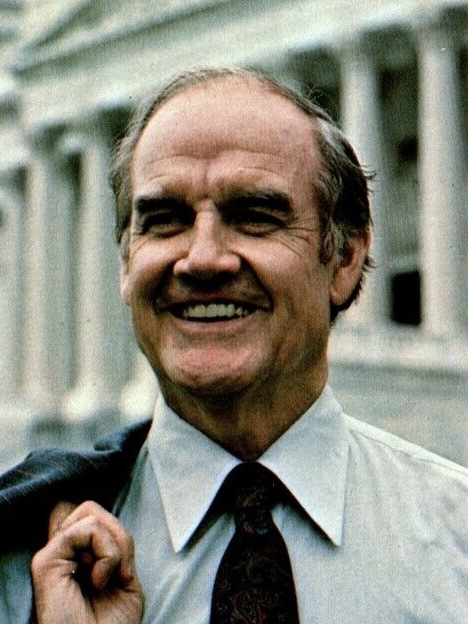

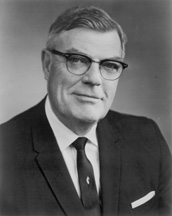
Nominee	George McGovern	Joseph H. Bottum
Party	Democratic	Republican
Popular vote	127,458	126,861
Percentage	50.12%	49.88%
- County results McGovern: 50–60% 60–70% Bottum: 50–60% 60–70% 70–80%
U.S. senator before election
Joseph H. Bottum
Republican
Elected U.S. Senator
George McGovern
Democratic

South Dakota general election
Party	Candidate	Votes	%
Democratic	George McGovern	127,458	50.12
Republican	Joseph H. Bottum (incumbent)	126,861	49.88
Majority		597	0.24
Turnout		254,319	
Democratic gain from Republican			

== Utah ==
1962 United States Senate election in Utah
- November 6, 1962
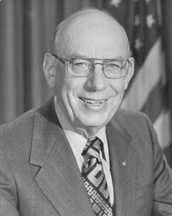

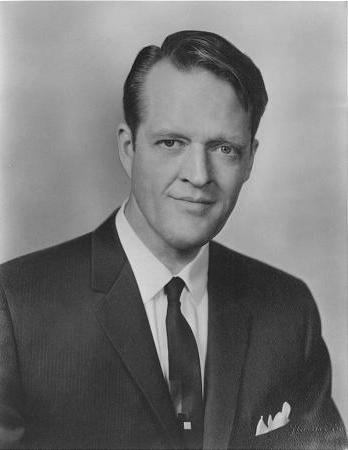
Nominee	Wallace F. Bennett	David S. King
Party	Republican	Democratic
Popular vote	166,755	151,656
Percentage	52.37%	47.63%
- County results Bennett: 50–60% 60–70% 70–80% King: 50–60% 60–70%
U.S. senator before election
Wallace F. Bennett
Republican
Elected U.S. Senator
Wallace F. Bennett
Republican

Utah general election
Party	Candidate	Votes	%
Republican	Wallace F. Bennett (incumbent)	166,755	52.37
Democratic	David S. King	151,656	47.63
Majority		15,099	4.74
Turnout		318,411	
Republican hold			

== Vermont ==
1962 United States Senate election in Vermont
- November 6, 1962
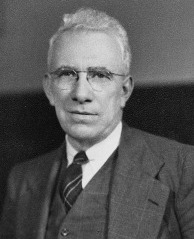

Nominee	George Aiken	W. Robert Johnson
Party	Republican	Democratic
Popular vote	81,241	40,134
Percentage	66.83%	33.17%
- County results Aiken: 50–60% 60–70% 70-80%
U.S. senator before election
George Aiken
Republican
Elected U.S. Senator
George Aiken
Republican

Vermont general election
Party	Candidate	Votes	%
Republican	George D. Aiken (incumbent)	81,242	66.93
Democratic	W. Robert Johnson Sr.	40,134	33.07
Majority		41,108	33.86
Turnout		121,376	
Republican hold			

== Washington ==
1962 United States Senate election in Washington
- November 6, 1962
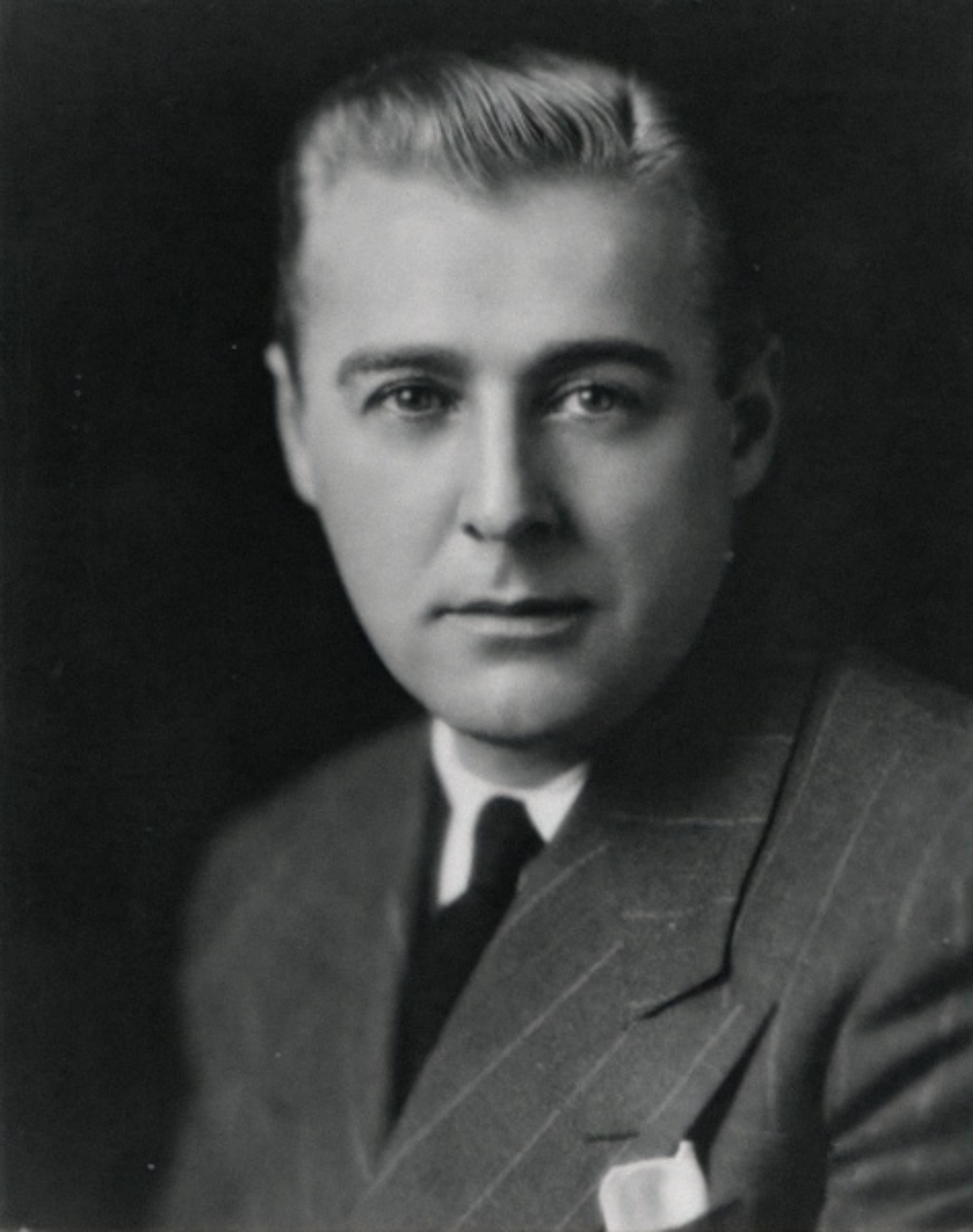
Nominee	Warren Magnuson	Richard G. Christensen
Party	Democratic	Republican
Popular vote	491,365	446,204
Percentage	52.09%	47.31%
- County results Magnuson: 50–60% 60–70% Christensen: 50–60% 60–70%
U.S. senator before election
Warren Magnuson
Democratic
Elected U.S. Senator
Warren Magnuson
Democratic

Washington general election
Party	Candidate	Votes	%
Democratic	Warren G. Magnuson (incumbent)	491,365	52.09
Republican	Richard G. Christensen	446,204	47.31
Socialist Labor	Henry Killman	4,730	0.50
Constitution	W. Frank Horne	930	0.10
Majority		45,161	4.78
Turnout		943,229	
Democratic hold			

== Wisconsin ==
1962 United States Senate election in Wisconsin
- November 6, 1962
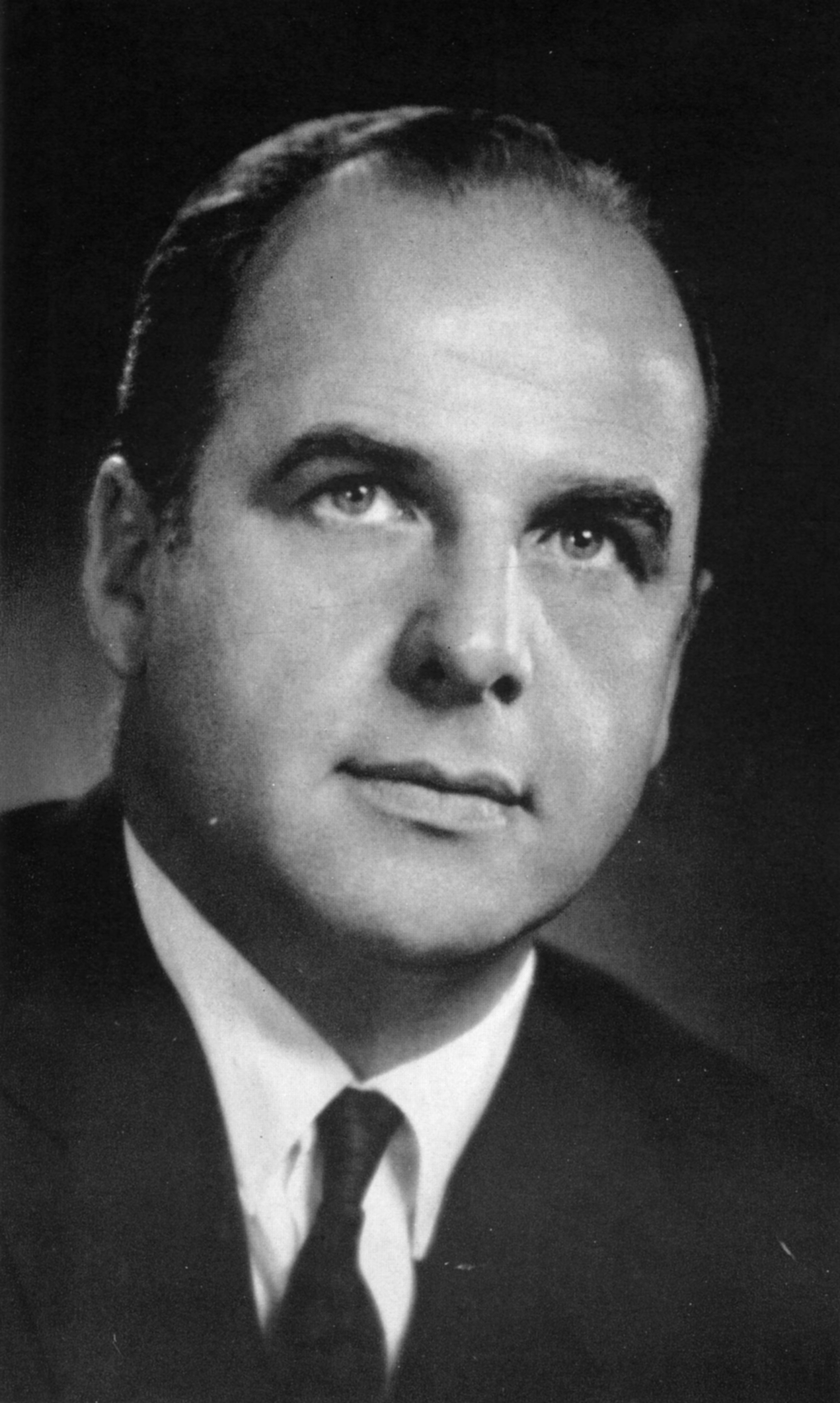

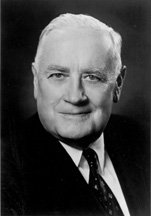
Nominee	Gaylord Nelson	Alexander Wiley
Party	Democratic	Republican
Popular vote	662,342	594,846
Percentage	52.26%	47.21%
- County results Nelson: 50–60% 60–70% Wiley: 40-50% 50-60% 60-70% 70-80%
U.S. senator before election
Alexander Wiley
Republican
Elected U.S. Senator
Gaylord A. Nelson
Democratic

Incumbent Republican Alexander Wiley lost to Democrat Gaylord A. Nelson.

Wisconsin election results
Party	Candidate	Votes	%
Democratic	Gaylord A. Nelson	662,342	52.26
Republican	Alexander Wiley (incumbent)	594,846	47.21
Independent	William Osborne Hart	1,428	0.11
Socialist Labor	Georgia Cozzini	1,096	0.09
Socialist Workers	Wayne Leverenz	368	0.03
None	Scattering	88	0.01
Majority		67,496	5.36
Turnout		1,260,168	
Democratic gain from Republican			

== Wyoming (special) ==
1962 United States Senate special election in Wyoming
- November 6, 1962
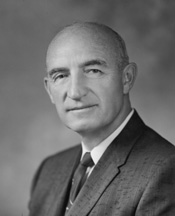

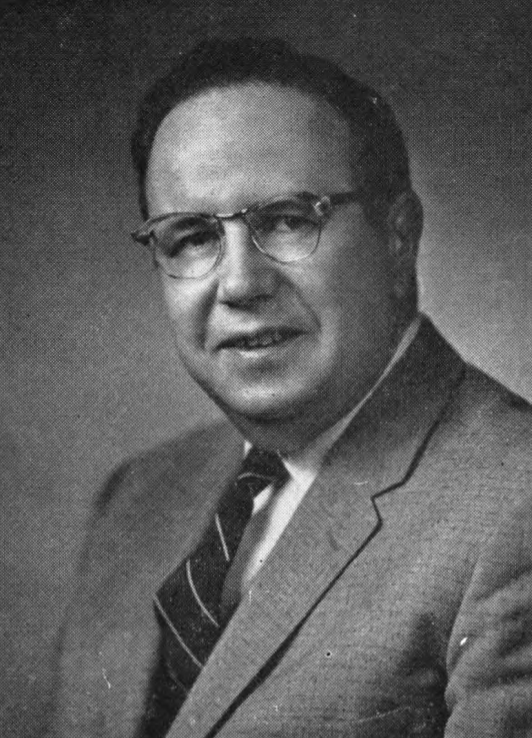
Nominee	Milward Simpson	John J. Hickey
Party	Republican	Democratic
Popular vote	69,043	50,329
Percentage	57.84%	42.16%
- County results Simpson: 50–60% 60–70% 70–80% Hickey: 50–60% 60–70%
U.S. senator before election
John J. Hickey
Democratic
Elected U.S. Senator
Milward Simpson
Republican

1962 United States Senate special election in Wyoming
Party	Candidate	Votes	%
Republican	Milward Simpson	69,043	57.84
Democratic	John J. Hickey (incumbent)	50,329	42.16
Majority		18,714	15.68
Turnout		119,372	
Republican gain from Democratic			

== See also ==
- 1962 United States elections
  - 1962 United States gubernatorial elections
  - 1962 United States House of Representatives elections
- 87th United States Congress
- 88th United States Congress
