= 1966 United States Senate election in New Hampshire =

- November 8, 1966
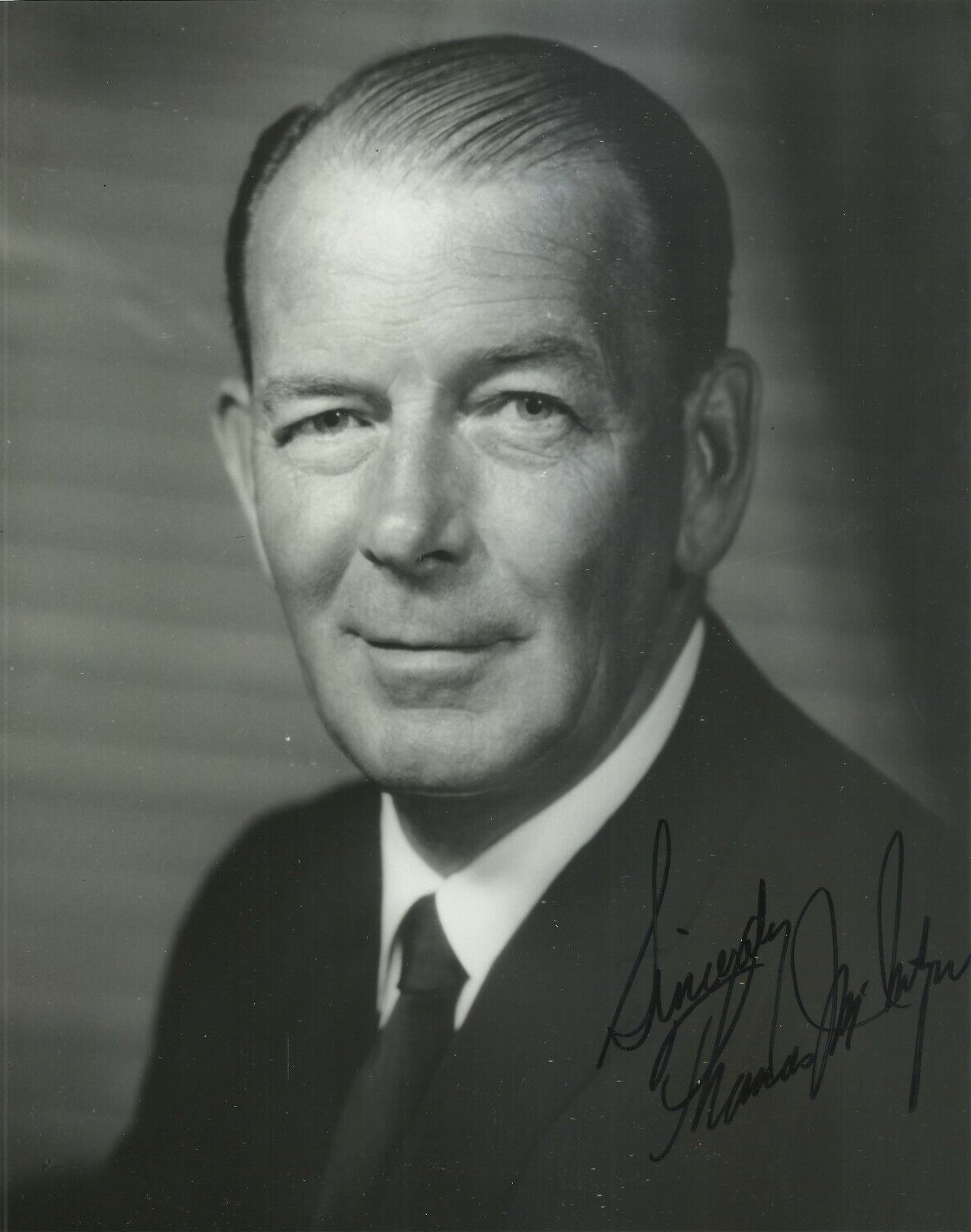

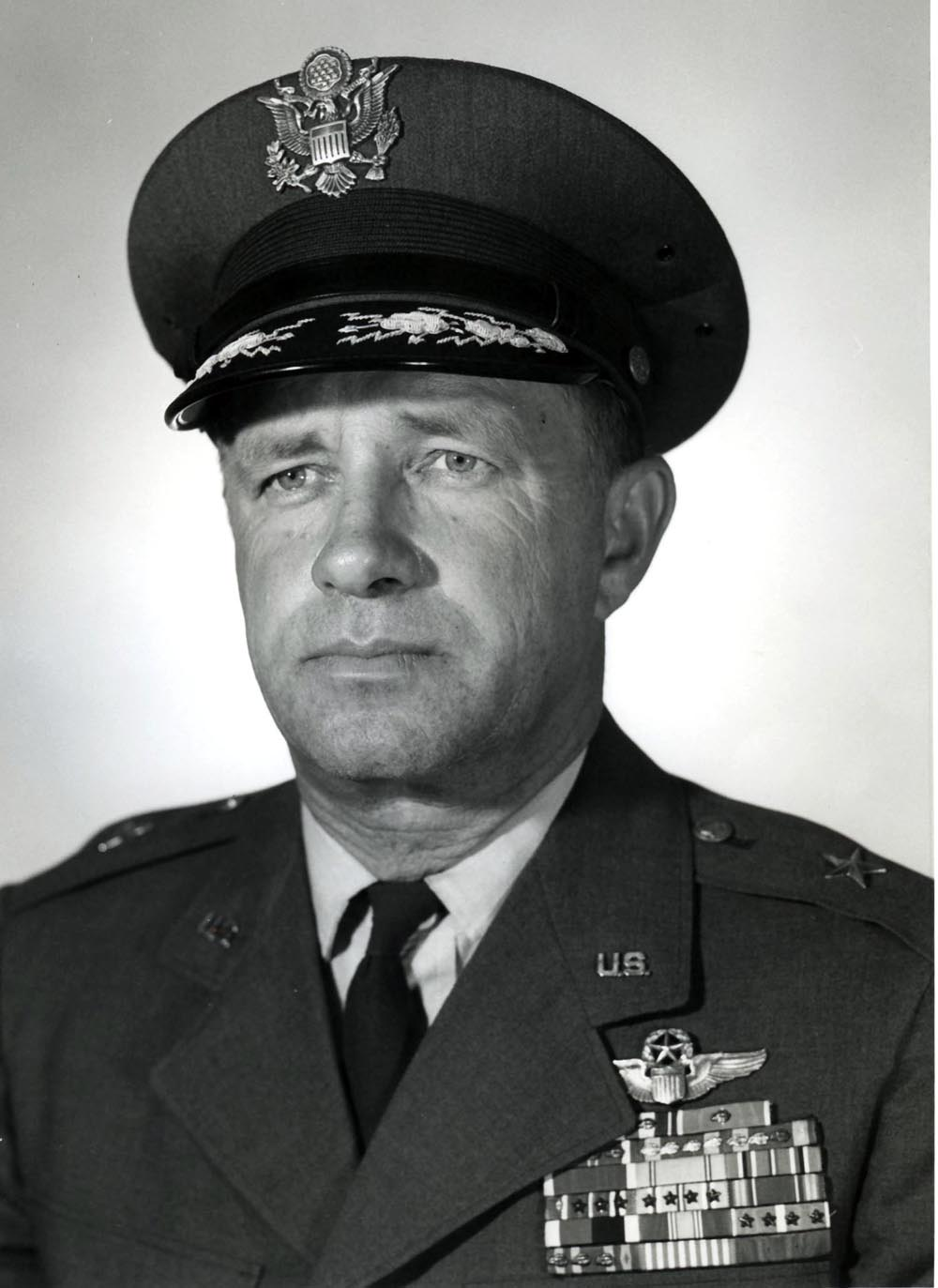
Nominee	Thomas J. McIntyre	Harrison Thyng
Party	Democratic	Republican
Popular vote	123,888	105,241
Percentage	54.03%	45.90%
- McIntyre: 50–60% 60–70% 70–80% 80–90% Thyng: 50–60% 60–70% 70–80% 80–90% Tie: 50%
U.S. senator before election
Thomas J. McIntyre
Democratic
Elected U.S. Senator
Thomas J. McIntyre
Democratic

The 1966 United States Senate election in New Hampshire took place on November 8, 1966. Incumbent Democratic Senator Thomas J. McIntyre won re-election to a full term, having first been elected in a special election in 1962. This was the first time that a Democrat was reelected to the Senate from New Hampshire.

== Primary elections ==
Primary elections were held on September 13, 1966.

=== Democratic primary ===
==== Candidates ====
- Thomas J. McIntyre, incumbent United States Senator

==== Results ====
Democratic primary results
Party	Candidate	Votes	%
Democratic	Thomas J. McIntyre (incumbent)	26,668	100.00
Total votes		26,668	100.00

=== Republican primary ===
==== Candidates ====
- Harold W. Ayer, former state employee
- Doloris Bridges, unsuccessful candidate for Republican nomination for U.S. Senate in 1962 special election
- Lane Dwinell, former Governor
- William R. Johnson, former chairman of the New Hampshire Republican Party
- Wesley Powell, former Governor
- Harrison R. Thyng, former United States Air Force Brigadier General

==== Results ====
Republican primary results
Party	Candidate	Votes	%
Republican	Harrison R. Thyng	22,741	29.52
Republican	Wesley Powell	18,145	23.55
Republican	William R. Johnson	17,410	22.60
Republican	Lane Dwinell	10,781	13.99
Republican	Doloris Bridges	7,613	9.88
Republican	Harold W. Ayer	351	0.46
Total votes		77,041	100.00

== General election ==
=== Results ===
1966 United States Senate election in New Hampshire
Party	Candidate	Votes	%
Democratic	Thomas J. McIntyre (Incumbent)	123,888	54.03
Republican	Harrison R. Thyng	105,241	45.90
None	Helen Bliss	108	0.05
Write-in		68	0.03
Majority		18,647	8.13
Turnout		229,305	
Democratic hold			

== See also ==
- 1966 United States Senate elections

== Bibliography ==
- Congressional Elections, 1946-1996. Washington, D.C.: Congressional Quarterly Inc. 1998. ISBN 1-56802-248-4.
- Stark, Robert L., ed. (1967). Manual for the General Court of New Hampshire. Vol. 40. Concord, NH: Department of State, New Hampshire.
- Scammon, Richard M., ed. (1968). America Votes 7: a handbook of contemporary American election statistics, 1966. Washington, D.C.: Governmental Affairs Institute.
