= 1962 United States Senate special election in New Hampshire =

- November 6, 1962
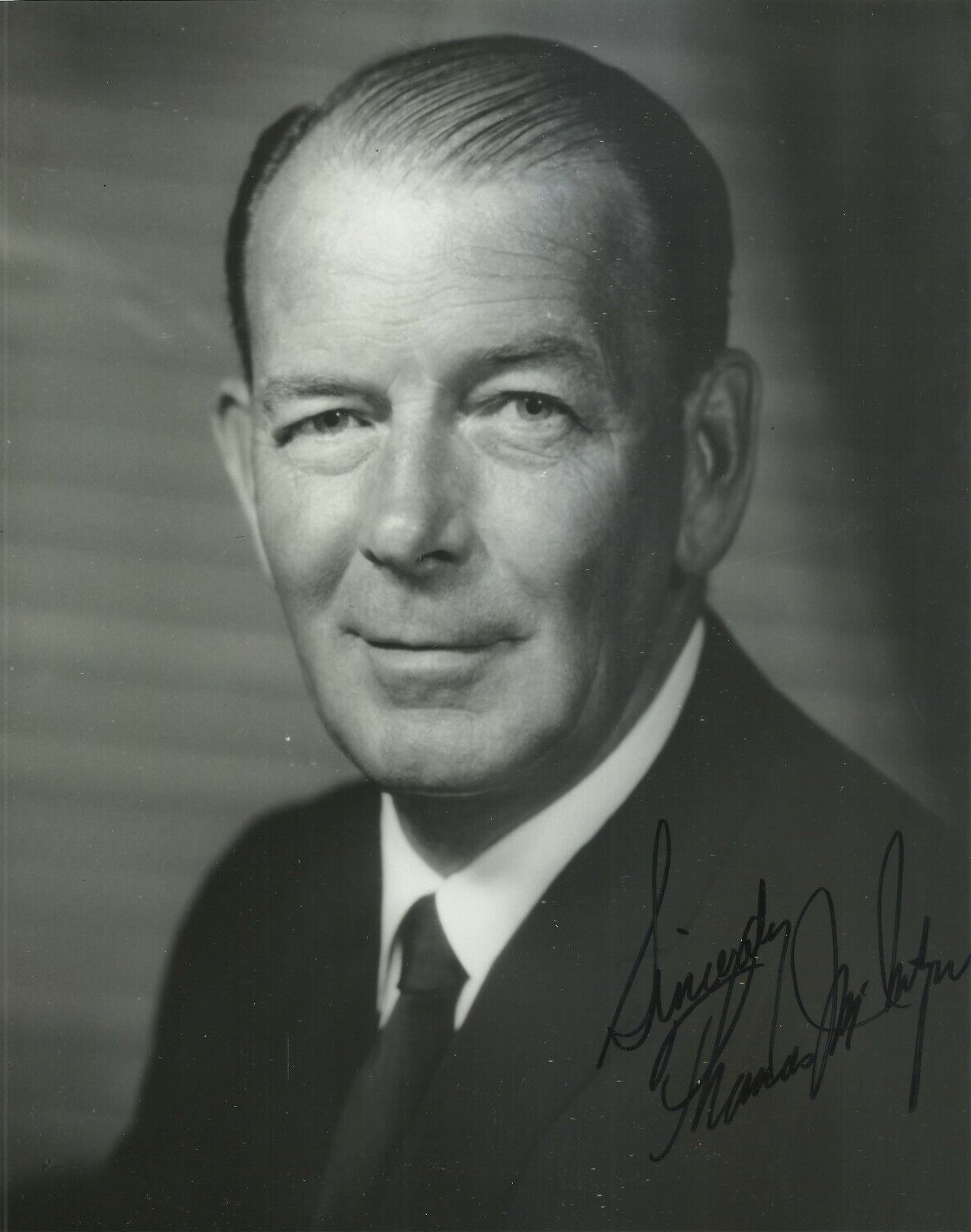

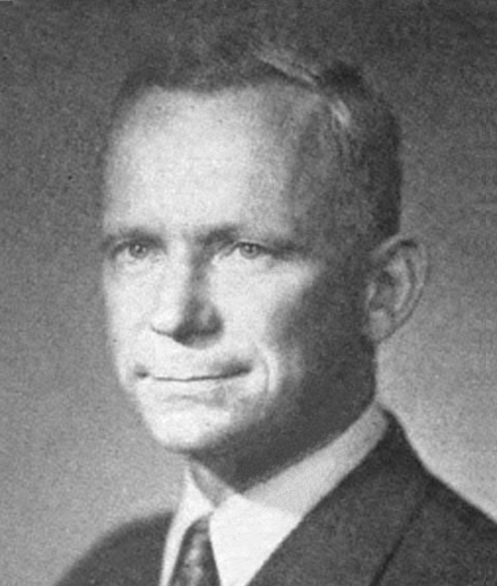
Nominee	Thomas J. McIntyre	Perkins Bass
Party	Democratic	Republican
Popular vote	117,612	107,199
Percentage	52.32%	47.68%
- McIntyre: 50–60% 60–70% 70–80% 80–90% Bass: 50–60% 60–70% 70–80% 80–90% >90%
U.S. senator before election
Maurice J. Murphy Jr.
Republican
Elected U.S. Senator
Thomas J. McIntyre
Democratic

The 1962 United States Senate special election in New Hampshire took place on November 6, 1962, to elect a U.S. Senator to complete the unexpired term of Senator Styles Bridges, who died on November 26, 1961. New Hampshire Attorney General Maurice J. Murphy Jr. was appointed on December 7, 1961, by Governor Wesley Powell to fill the vacancy until a special election could be held.

Murphy placed third in the Republican primary, being defeated by Congressman Perkins Bass, who went on to be defeated in the general election by Democratic nominee former Mayor of Laconia, Thomas J. McIntyre. Democrats won this seat for the first time since 1912. It is the last time where an incumbent Senator placed third or worse in a primary until the 2026 United States Senate election in Louisiana.

== Primary elections ==
Primary elections were held on September 11, 1962.

=== Democratic primary ===
==== Candidates ====
- Thomas J. McIntyre, former Mayor of Laconia, New Hampshire and Democratic nominee for New Hampshire's 1st congressional district in 1954

==== Results ====
Democratic primary results
Party	Candidate	Votes	%
Democratic	Thomas J. McIntyre	24,885	100.00
Total votes		24,885	100.00

=== Republican primary ===
==== Candidates ====
- Perkins Bass, incumbent U.S. Representative
- Doloris Bridges, widow of Styles Bridges
- Chester Earl Merrow, incumbent U.S. Representative
- Maurice J. Murphy Jr., incumbent United States Senator

==== Results ====
Republican primary results
Party	Candidate	Votes	%
Republican	Perkins Bass	31,037	31.35
Republican	Doloris Bridges	29,345	29.64
Republican	Maurice J. Murphy Jr. (incumbent)	24,204	24.45
Republican	Chester Earl Merrow	14,417	14.56
Total votes		99,003	100.00

== General election ==
=== Results ===
1962 United States Senate special election in New Hampshire
Party	Candidate	Votes	%
Democratic	Thomas J. McIntyre	117,612	52.32
Republican	Perkins Bass	107,199	47.68
Majority		10,413	4.64
Turnout		224,811	
Democratic gain from Republican			

== See also ==
- 1962 United States Senate elections

== Bibliography ==
- Congressional Elections, 1946-1996. Washington, D.C.: Congressional Quarterly Inc. 1998. ISBN 1-56802-248-4.
- Stark, Robert L., ed. (1963). Manual for the General Court of New Hampshire. Vol. 38. Concord, NH: Department of State, New Hampshire.
- Scammon, Richard M., ed. (1964). America Votes 5: a handbook of contemporary American election statistics, 1962. Washington, D.C.: Governmental Affairs Institute.
