= Thomas J. McIntyre =

American politician

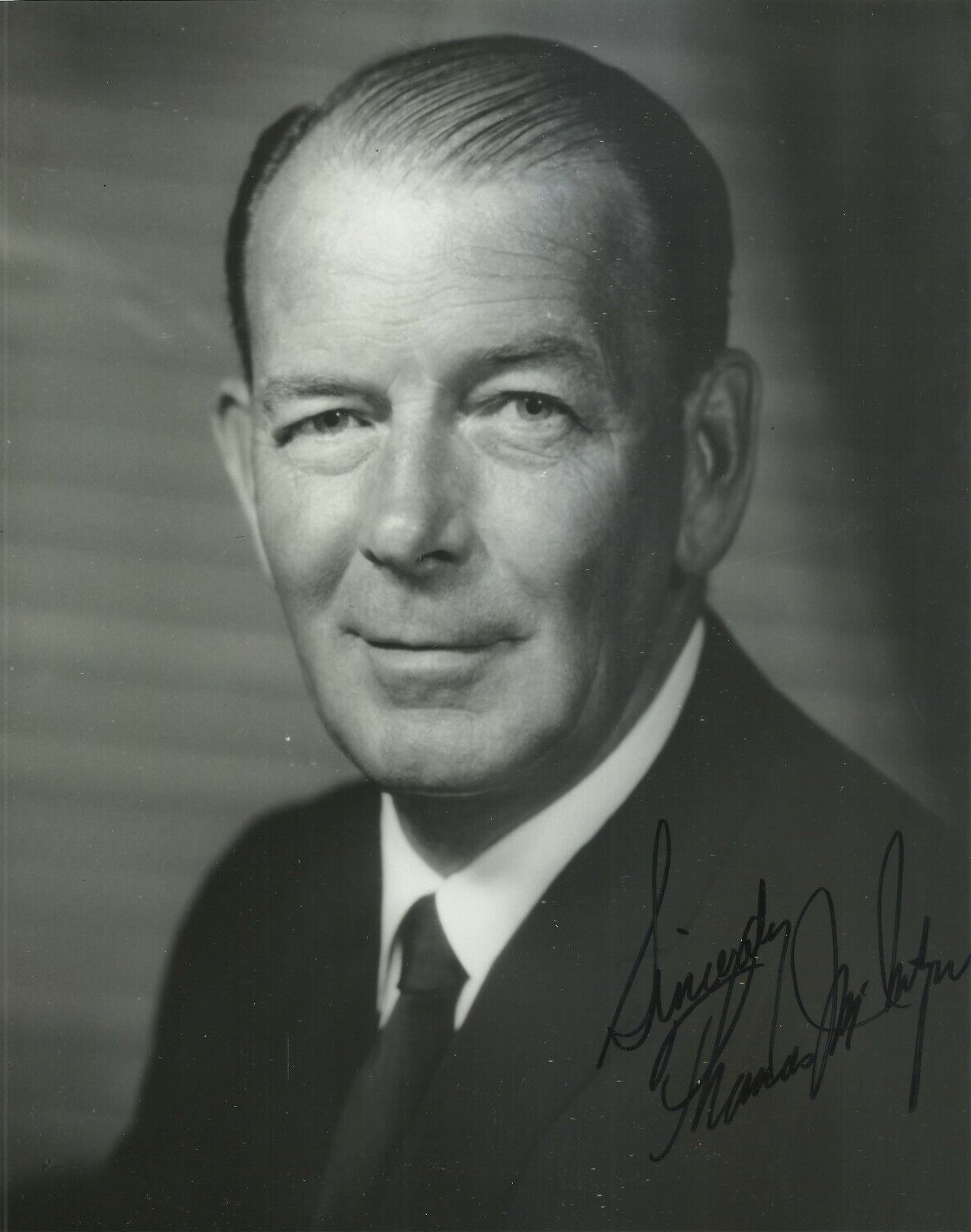

United States Senator from New Hampshire
- In office November 7, 1962 – January 3, 1979
- Preceded by: Maurice J. Murphy Jr.
- Succeeded by: Gordon J. Humphrey

Mayor of Laconia, New Hampshire
- In office 1949 – 1951
- Preceded by: Albert Parmentier
- Succeeded by: Robinson W. Smith

Personal details
- Born: Thomas James McIntyre; February 20, 1915 Laconia, New Hampshire, U.S.
- Died: August 8, 1992 (aged 77) Palm Beach, Florida, U.S.
- Resting place: Lambert Cemetery
- Party: Democratic
- Spouse: Myrtle Ann Clement (m. 1941–1992)
- Education: Dartmouth College, B.A. 1937; Boston University School of Law, LL.B. 1940
- Profession: Lawyer

Military service
- Allegiance: United States
- Branch/service: United States Army (Reserves)
- Years of service: 1942–1946
- Rank: Major
- Battles/wars: World War II

Thomas James McIntyre (February 20, 1915 – August 8, 1992) was an American lawyer and politician. A member of the Democratic Party, he served as a United States senator from New Hampshire from 1962 to 1979.

== Early life and education ==
Thomas McIntyre was born in Laconia, New Hampshire, to Thomas James and Helen Grey (née Trask) McIntyre. He received his early education at parochial and public schools in Laconia. Shortly after his mother's death in 1927, he entered Manlius Military School in Onondaga County, New York. He graduated from Manlius in 1933 and, returning to New Hampshire, enrolled at Dartmouth College in Hanover. During college, he was a member of the Green Key Society and the Palaeopitus Senior Society. He earned a Bachelor of Arts degree in history and political science from Dartmouth in 1937.

McIntyre then studied at the Boston University School of Law in Massachusetts, receiving his Bachelor of Laws degree in 1940. In May 1941, he married Myrtle Ann Clement, to whom he remained married until his death; the couple had one daughter, Martha.

== Early career ==
In 1940, McIntyre was admitted to the bar and joined the law office of former Senator Robert W. Upton in Concord. He returned to Laconia following his father's death in 1941, and there opened his own practice. During World War II, he served in the United States Army from 1942 to 1946. He was first commissioned as a second lieutenant in the Army Reserve, training at Camp Croft in South Carolina (now Croft State Park) and at Fort Benning in Georgia. He was then assigned to the 94th Infantry Division and later served in the Third Army under General George S. Patton, participating in all the major European campaigns. At the end of the war, he was made a military government judge of the Amtsgericht (lower court) in Düsseldorf, Germany. He was discharged as a major, and earned four battle stars, the Combat Infantryman Badge, and the Bronze Star Medal.

Following his military service, McIntyre returned to Laconia and joined the law office of Harold E. Westcott in 1946. He opened his own office after Wescott was made a judge of the New Hampshire Superior Court. He also joined his brother as a partner in McIntyre Properties, a firm that owned and managed rental real estate, and served as president of the Community TV Corporation, which specialized in television antennae. He later served as chairman of the Laconia Democratic Committee and the Belknap County Democratic Committee, and was a delegate to the 1956 Democratic National Convention. He was also director of the Laconia-Weirs Beach Chamber of Commerce (1960–1963) and of the Laconia Development Corporation (1962). In 1980, he was elected to the Common Cause National Governing Board.

== Mayor and city solicitor of Laconia 1949 to 1953 ==
A Democrat, McIntyre served as mayor of Laconia from 1949 to 1951. During his administration, he oversaw the construction of a sewage disposal plant and a municipal bathing beach. He declined to run for Governor of New Hampshire in 1950, he served as city solicitor of Laconia in 1953.

== 1954 Campaign for Congress ==
In 1954, McIntyre won the Democratic nomination for the United States House of Representatives from New Hampshire's 1st congressional district. In the general election, he faced seven-term Republican incumbent Chester Earl Merrow. He was narrowly defeated by Merrow in November, losing by only 468 votes. A recount was subsequently held, but McIntyre still trailed Merrow by 397 votes.

== United States Senator (1962-1979) ==
Following the death of Senator Styles Bridges in November 1961, McIntyre ran unopposed for the Democratic nomination to fill Bridges's unexpired term in the United States Senate. His chances for victory were enhanced by a bitter four-way primary in the Republican Party between Maurice J. Murphy, Jr., who had been appointed by Governor Wesley Powell to Bridges's seat; the Senator's widow, Doloris Bridges; and the state's two U.S. Representatives, Perkins Bass and Chester Merrow. Bass ultimately won the nomination, and faced McIntyre in the general election. During the campaign, McIntyre ran on a platform supporting President John F. Kennedy's proposal for federal aid to education and for medical care to the elderly under Social Security. In the special election on November 6, 1962, he defeated Bass by 10,413 votes. He was the first Democratic Senator elected from New Hampshire since Fred H. Brown in 1932, and only the second Democrat to be popularly elected to the Senate from New Hampshire.

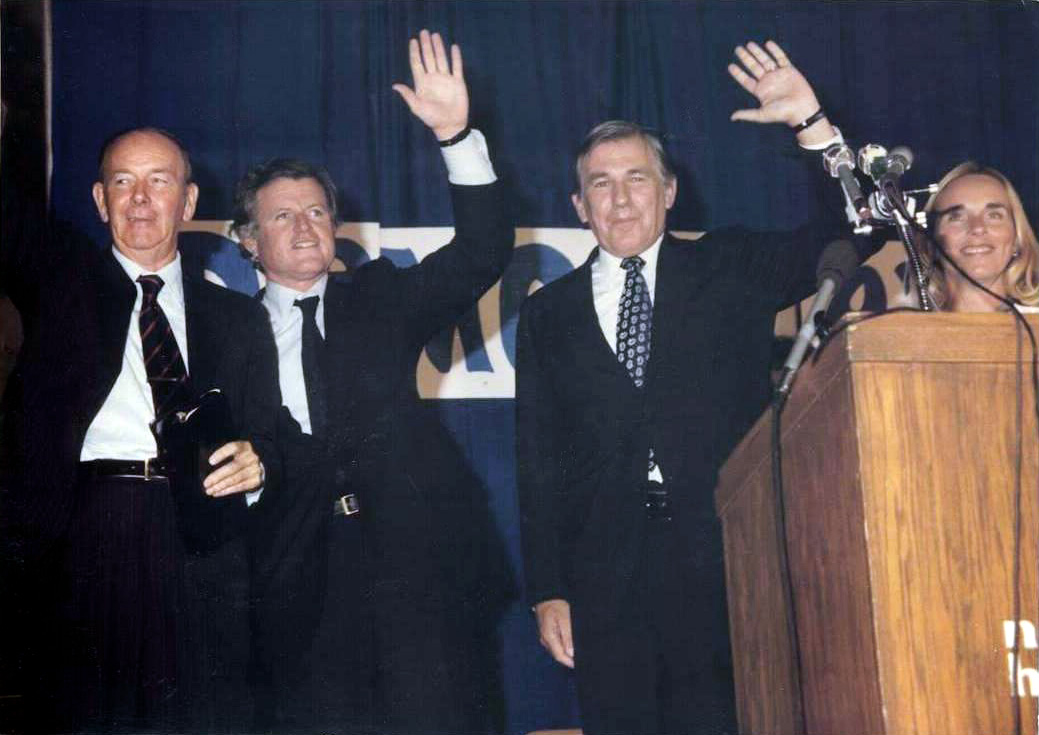
Senator McIntyre, Senator Ted Kennedy, Governor Hugh Gallen, and Executive Councilor Dudley Dudley

McIntyre was officially seated in the Senate on November 13, 1962. During his tenure, he served as chairman of the Armed Services Subcommittee on Research and Development; of the Banking Subcommittee on Financial Institutions; and of the Small Business Subcommittee on Government Regulation. He supported the Kennedy administration on national wilderness preservation, youth employment, and increased area redevelopment aid, but opposed Kennedy's proposal for mass transportation. He supported an amendment by Senator Richard Russell, Jr. to remove funds for the Nike-Zeus antimissile system from a defense procurement bill, and endorsed a motion by Senator Margaret Chase Smith to add $134,000,000 for two additional nuclear submarines to the same bill. He sponsored the law creating share-draft checking accounts for savings institutions.

McIntyre won a full term in 1966, defeating retired pilot Harrison Thyng by 18,647 votes, to become the first Democratic Senator in the state's history to win a second term. Originally a strong supporter of the Vietnam War, he served as co-chairman of President Lyndon B. Johnson's campaign in New Hampshire in the 1968 election and called Johnson's primary opponent, Senator Eugene McCarthy, an "appeaser." However, he later came to oppose the war, saying, "Our nation is tearing itself apart."

In 1967, as subcommittee chairman on the Banking Committee, he demonstrated that he could beat the recommendations of stock investors by throwing darts at stock listings.

He was re-elected to a third term in 1972, defeating former Governor Wesley Powell by 44,643 votes.

McIntyre led an unsuccessful attempt to filibuster George H. W. Bush's confirmation as Director of Central Intelligence in 1976, believing the former chairman of the Republican National Committee would politicize the agency. In 1978, he narrowly lost his bid for a fourth term to Gordon Humphrey, by 5,800 votes, who took advantage of a nationwide conservative movement and McIntyre's tendency to spend more time in Florida than in New Hampshire.

== Later life and death ==
Recognizing the rising power of the New Right in his defeat, McIntyre published The Fear Brokers, in 1979, co-authored with John Obert. In his book, McIntyre described the forces and personalities of the New Right across the nation, focusing particularly on the struggle in his home state. He divided his time between his native Laconia and Tequesta, Florida.

McIntyre died at Good Samaritan Hospital in West Palm Beach, at age 77. He is buried in St. Lambert Cemetery in Laconia.

Party political offices
Preceded by Herbert W. Hill	Democratic nominee for U.S. Senator from New Hampshire (Class 2); 1962, 1966, 1972, 1978	Succeeded by Norman D'Amours
U.S. Senate
Preceded by Maurice J. Murphy, Jr.	U.S. senator (Class 2) from New Hampshire; 1962–1979; Served alongside: Norris Cotton, Louis C. Wyman, John A. Durkin	Succeeded by Gordon J. Humphrey
