= Senator Jacobson =

Senator Jacobsen or Jacobson may refer to:

- Alf E. Jacobson (1924–2010), New Hampshire State Senate
- Clarence Jacobson (1912–1990), Nebraska State Senate
- Jeff Jacobson (politician) (fl. 1990s–2000s), Ohio State Senate
- Judy Jacobson (1939–2019), Montana State Senate
- Mike Jacobson (born 1953), Nebraska State Senate
- Tom Jacobson (born 1967), Montana State Senate

== See also ==
- Ken Jacobsen (born 1945), Washington State Senate
