= Perkins Bass =

American politician (1912–2011)

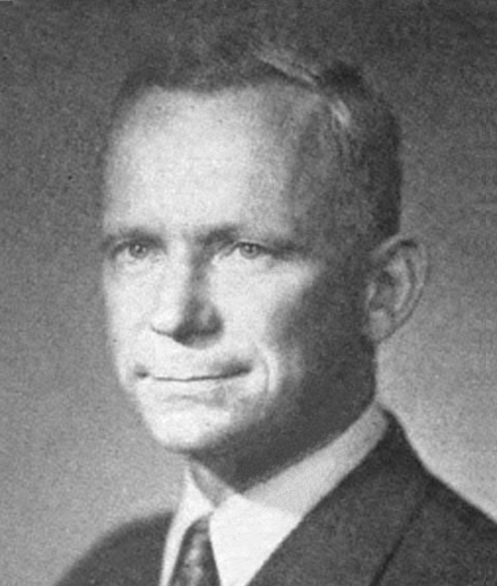

Member of the U.S. House of Representatives from New Hampshire's 2nd district
- In office January 3, 1955 – January 3, 1963
- Preceded by: Norris Cotton
- Succeeded by: James Colgate Cleveland

Personal details
- Born: October 6, 1912 East Walpole, Massachusetts, U.S.
- Died: October 25, 2011 (aged 99) Peterborough, New Hampshire, U.S.
- Party: Republican
- Children: Charles Bass

Perkins Bass (October 6, 1912 – October 25, 2011) was an American elected official from the state of New Hampshire, including four terms as a U.S. representative from 1955 to 1963.

== Biography ==
Bass was born on October 6, 1912, in East Walpole, Massachusetts. He was the eldest son of former New Hampshire Governor Robert P. Bass and First Lady Edith B. Bass. Bass attended Milton Academy, graduated from Dartmouth College in 1934, and from Harvard Law School. He practiced as a lawyer and served in the United States Army Air Forces in Asia during World War II. He was elected state representative in 1939, 1941, 1947, and 1951, and as state senator in 1949, all to two-year terms. Bass voted in favor of the Civil Rights Acts of 1957 and 1960, but voted present on the 24th Amendment to the U.S. Constitution.

After serving four terms in the U.S. Congress, he ran unsuccessfully for the U.S. Senate in a 1962 special election. After defeating interim Senator Maurice J. Murphy Jr., Doloris Bridges, and Congressman Chester Merrow in the Republican primary, he was defeated in the general election by Democrat Thomas J. McIntyre. From 1972 to 1976, he served as a selectman of Peterborough, New Hampshire, where he lived until his death in 2011, aged 99.

== Family ==
- Charles Bass, the U.S. representative from New Hampshire's 2nd congressional district (son)
- Robert P. Bass, the governor of New Hampshire from 1911 to 1913 (father)

U.S. House of Representatives
Preceded by Norris Cotton	Member of the U.S. House of Representatives from New Hampshire's 2nd congressional district January 3, 1955 – January 3, 1963	Succeeded by James Colgate Cleveland
Party political offices
Preceded by Styles Bridges	Republican nominee for U.S. Senator from New Hampshire (Class 2); 1962	Succeeded by Harrison Thyng
Honorary titles
Preceded by William F. Walsh	Oldest living U.S. representative (Sitting or former); January 8, 2011 – October 25, 2011	Succeeded by Ken Hechler
