= 1978 United States Senate election in New Hampshire =

- November 7, 1978
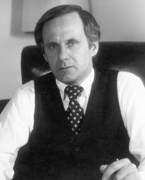

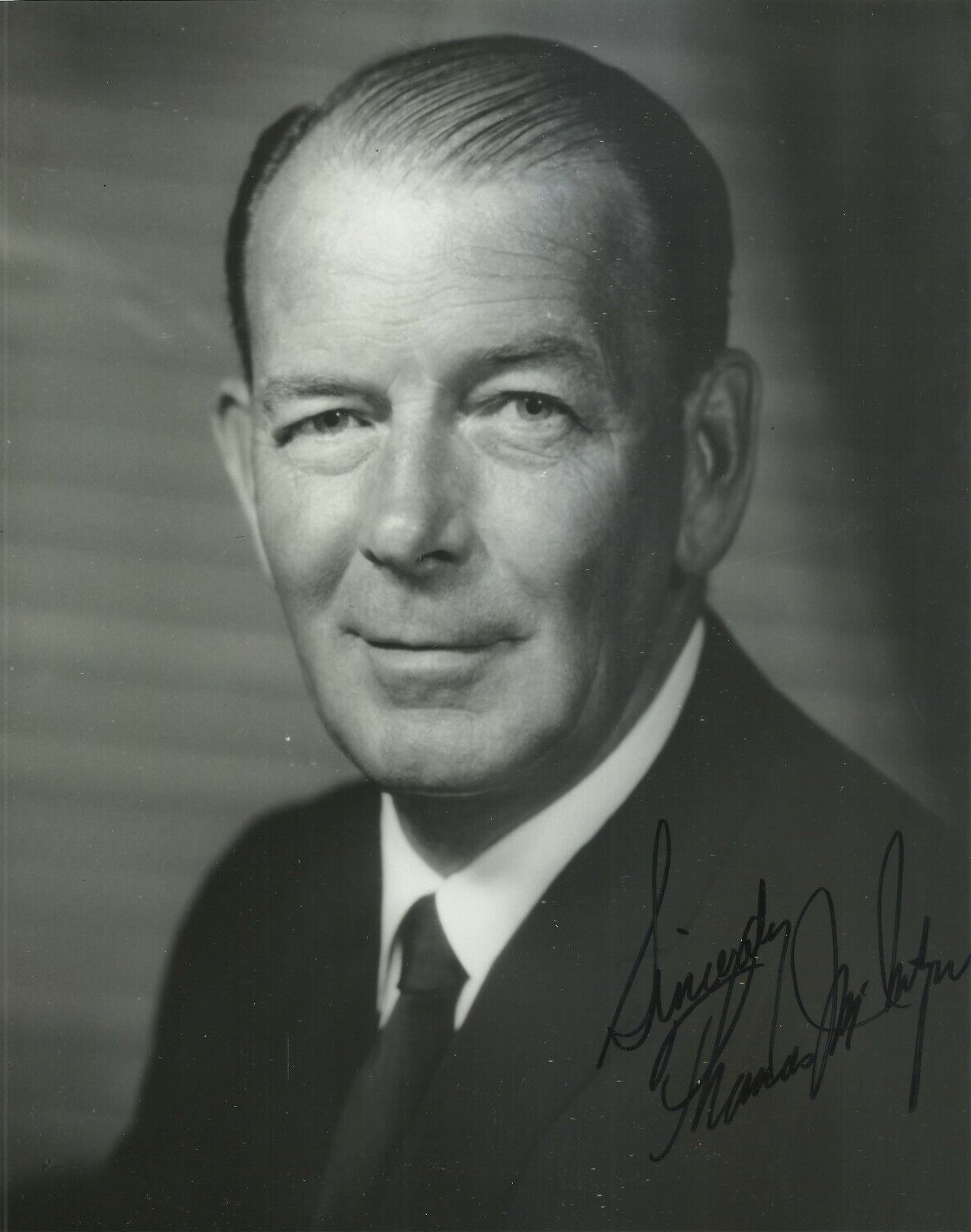
Nominee	Gordon J. Humphrey	Thomas J. McIntyre
Party	Republican	Democratic
Popular vote	133,745	127,945
Percentage	50.71%	48.51%
- Humphrey: 50–60% 60–70% 70–80% 80–90% >90% McIntyre: 40–50% 50–60% 60–70% 70–80% 80–90% >90%
U.S. senator before election
Thomas J. McIntyre
Democratic
Elected U.S. Senator
Gordon J. Humphrey
Republican

The 1978 United States Senate election in New Hampshire took place on November 7, 1978. Incumbent Democratic Senator Thomas J. McIntyre ran for re-election to a fourth term but was defeated by Republican Gordon J. Humphrey.

== Democratic primary ==
=== Candidates ===
- Raymond J. Coughlan, former U.S. Navy captain
- Thomas J. McIntyre, incumbent Senator

=== Results ===
1978 Democratic Senate primary
Party	Candidate	Votes	%
Democratic	Thomas J. McIntyre (incumbent)	31,796	80.70%
Democratic	Raymond J. Coughlan	7,605	19.30%
Total votes		39,401	100.00%

== Republican primary ==
=== Candidates ===
- Carmen Chimento, perennial candidate
- Gordon J. Humphrey, professional pilot and conservative activist
- Alf E. Jacobson, State Senator from New London
- James Masiello, businessman and former Mayor of Keene

=== Results ===
1978 Republican Senate primary
Party	Candidate	Votes	%
Republican	Gordon J. Humphrey	35,503	50.24%
Republican	James A. Masiello	18,371	26.00%
Republican	Alf E. Jacobson	13,619	19.27%
Republican	Carmen C. Chimento	2,885	4.08%
Democratic	Thomas J. McIntyre (incumbent, write-in)	243	0.34%
Write-in	All others	47	0.07%
Democratic	Raymond J. Coughlan (write-in)	1	0.00%
Total votes		70,669	100.00%

== General election ==
=== Results ===
General election results
Party	Candidate	Votes	%	±%
Republican	Gordon J. Humphrey	133,745	50.71%	▲7.59
Democratic	Thomas J. McIntyre (incumbent)	127,945	48.51%	▼8.37
Libertarian	Craig Franklin	2,070	0.79%	N/A
Total votes		284,047	100.00%	
Republican gain from Democratic		Swing		

== See also ==
- 1978 United States Senate elections
