= 1956 United States Senate election in New Hampshire =

- November 6, 1956
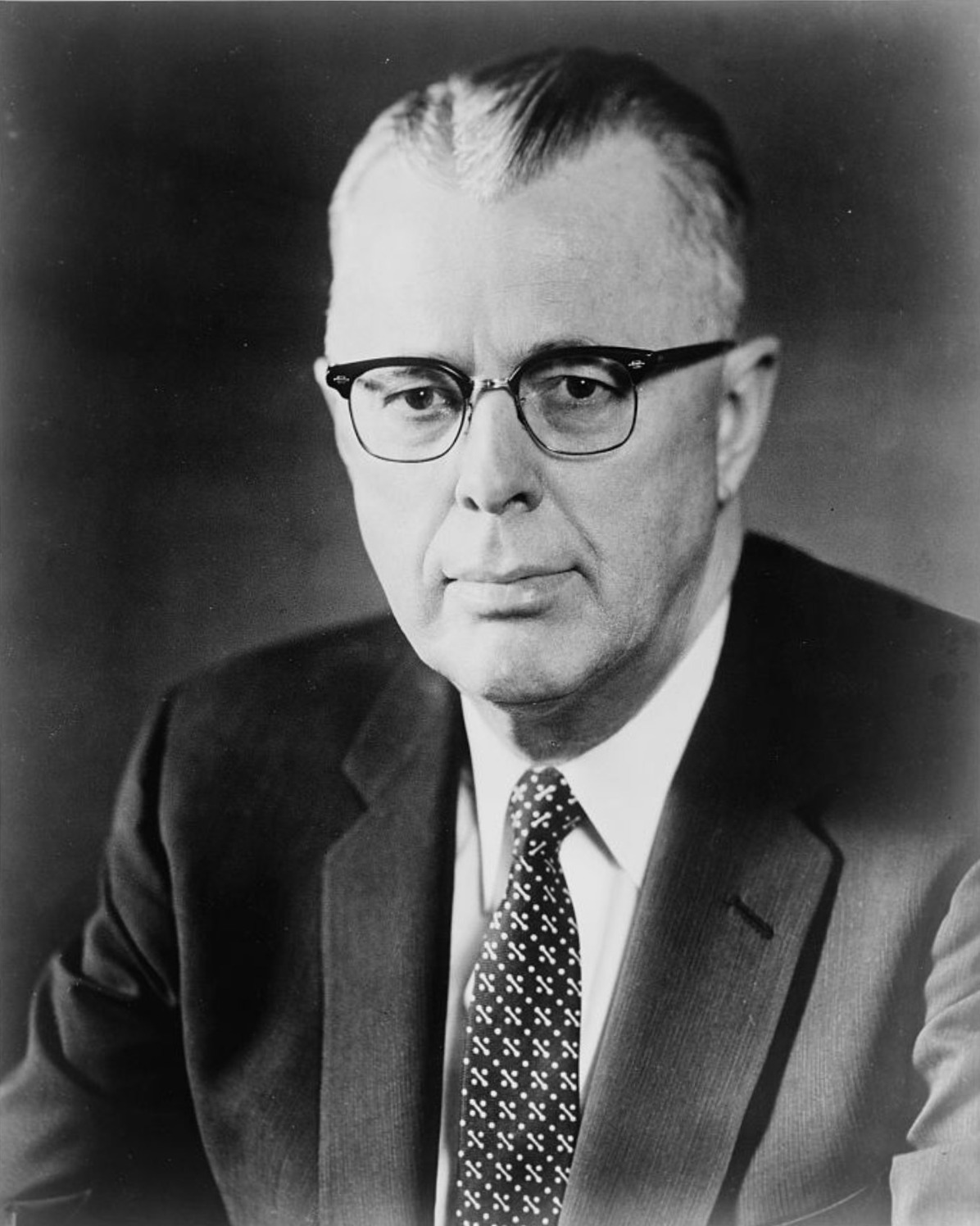

Nominee	Norris Cotton	Laurence M. Pickett
Party	Republican	Democratic
Popular vote	161,424	90,519
Percentage	64.07%	35.93%
- Cotton: 50–60% 60–70% 70–80% 80–90% >90% Pickett: 50–60% 60–70% 70–80%
U.S. senator before election
Norris Cotton
Republican
Elected U.S. Senator
Norris Cotton
Republican

The 1956 United States Senate election in New Hampshire took place on November 6, 1956. Incumbent Republican Senator Norris Cotton won re-election to a full term, having first been elected in a 1954 special election.

== Primary elections ==
Primary elections were held on September 11, 1956.

=== Democratic primary ===
==== Candidates ====
- Laurence M. Pickett, former Mayor of Keene, unsuccessful candidate for Democratic nomination for U.S. Senator in 1954

==== Results ====
Democratic primary results
Party	Candidate	Votes	%
Democratic	Laurence M. Pickett	23,440	100.00
Total votes		23,440	100.00

=== Republican primary ===
==== Candidates ====
- Norris Cotton, incumbent United States Senator
- Joseph Moore, unsuccessful candidate for Democratic nomination for U.S. Representative in 1946 and 1954

==== Results ====
Republican primary results
Party	Candidate	Votes	%
Republican	Norris Cotton (incumbent)	61,673	89.46
Republican	Joseph Moore	7,264	10.54
Total votes		68,937	100.00

== General election ==
=== Results ===
1956 United States Senate election in New Hampshire
Party	Candidate	Votes	%
Republican	Norris Cotton (Incumbent)	161,424	64.07
Democratic	Laurence M. Pickett	90,519	35.93
Majority		70,905	28.14
Turnout		251,943	
Republican hold			

== See also ==
- 1956 United States Senate elections

== Bibliography ==
- Congressional Elections, 1946-1996. Washington, D.C.: Congressional Quarterly Inc. 1998. ISBN 1-56802-248-4.
- Fuller, Enoch D., ed. (1957). Manual for the General Court of New Hampshire. Vol. 35. Concord, NH: Department of State, New Hampshire.
