= 1956 New Hampshire gubernatorial election =

- November 6, 1956
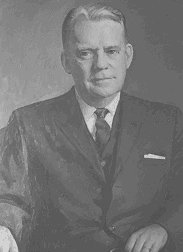

Nominee	Lane Dwinell	John Shaw
Party	Republican	Democratic
Popular vote	141,578	117,117
Percentage	54.73%	45.27%
- Dwinell: 50–60% 60–70% 70–80% 80–90% >90% Shaw: 50–60% 60–70% 70–80% 80–90%
Governor before election
Lane Dwinell
Republican
Elected Governor
Lane Dwinell
Republican

The 1956 New Hampshire gubernatorial election was held on November 6, 1956. Incumbent Republican Lane Dwinell defeated Democratic nominee John Shaw with 54.73% of the vote.

== Primary elections ==
Primary elections were held on September 11, 1956.

=== Republican primary ===
==== Candidates ====
- Lane Dwinell, incumbent Governor
- Wesley Powell, attorney
- Elmer E. Bussey

==== Results ====
Republican primary results
Party	Candidate	Votes	%
Republican	Lane Dwinell (incumbent)	38,734	53.13
Republican	Wesley Powell	33,408	45.82
Republican	Elmer E. Bussey	769	1.06
Total votes		72,911	100.00

== General election ==
=== Candidates ===
- Lane Dwinell, Republican
- John Shaw, Democratic

=== Results ===
1956 New Hampshire gubernatorial election
Party	Candidate	Votes	%	±%
Republican	Lane Dwinell (incumbent)	141,578	54.73%	
Democratic	John Shaw	117,117	45.27%	
Majority		24,461		
Turnout		258,695		
Republican hold		Swing		
