= 1954 United States Senate special election in New Hampshire =

- November 2, 1954
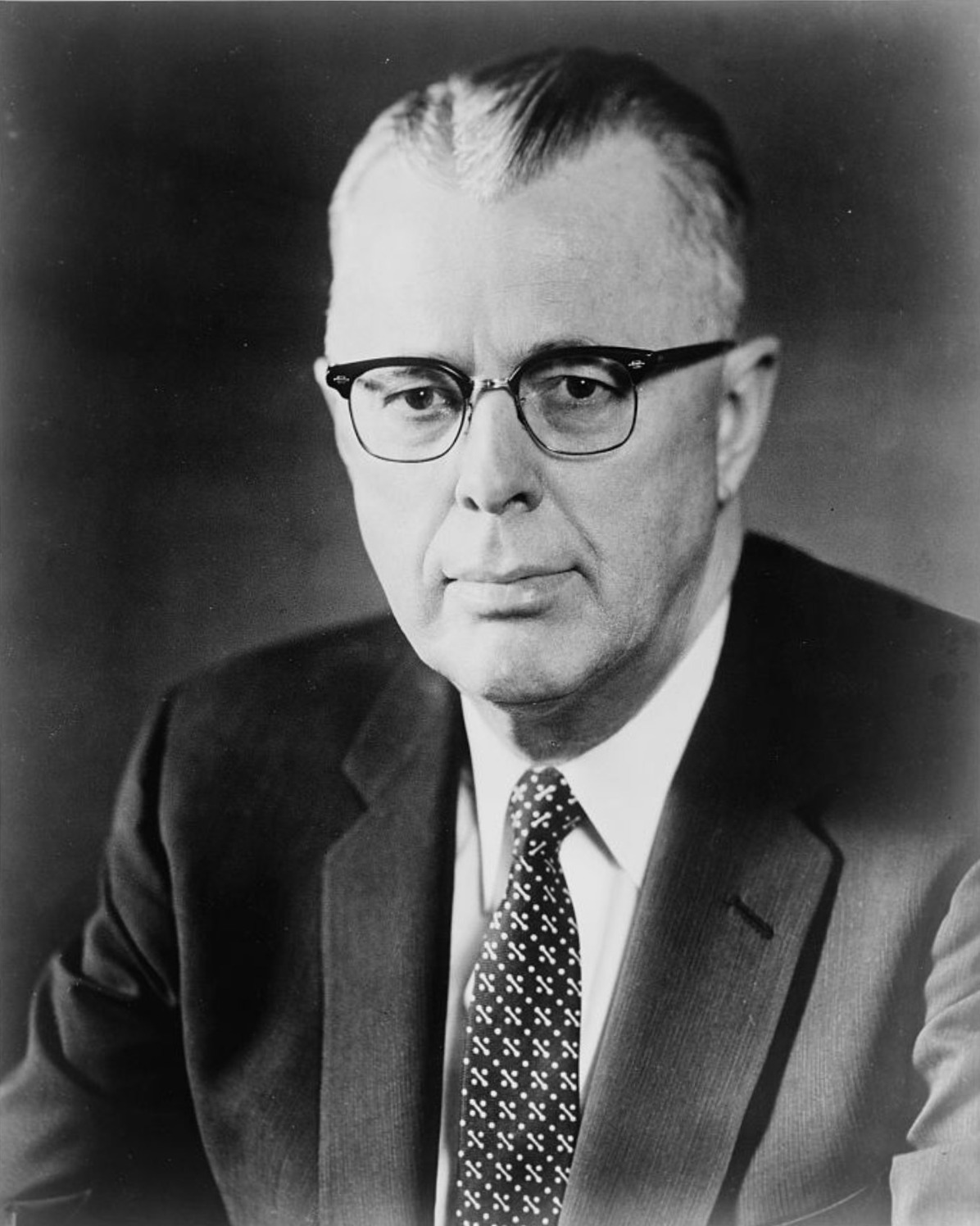

Nominee	Norris Cotton	Stanley J. Betley
Party	Republican	Democratic
Popular vote	114,068	75,490
Percentage	60.18%	39.82%
- Cotton: 50–60% 60–70% 70–80% 80–90% >90% Betley: 50–60% 60–70% 70–80% 80–90%
U.S. senator before election
Robert W. Upton
Republican
Elected U.S. Senator
Norris Cotton
Republican

The 1954 United States Senate special election in New Hampshire took place on November 2, 1954, to elect a U.S. Senator to complete the unexpired term of Senator Charles W. Tobey, who died on July 24, 1953. Former President of the New Hampshire Bar Association Robert W. Upton was appointed on August 14, 1953, by Governor Hugh Gregg to fill the vacancy until a special election could be held.

Upton was defeated in the Republican primary by Congressman Norris Cotton, who went on to defeat Democratic nominee Stanley J. Betley.

== Primary elections ==
Primary elections were held on September 14, 1954.

=== Democratic primary ===
==== Candidates ====
- Stanley J. Betley, State Representative
- Laurence M. Pickett, Mayor of Keene

==== Results ====
Democratic primary results
Party	Candidate	Votes	%
Democratic	Stanley J. Betley	12,486	54.89
Democratic	Laurence M. Pickett	10,262	45.11
Total votes		22,748	100.00

=== Republican primary ===
==== Candidates ====
- Norris Cotton, incumbent U.S. Representative
- Wesley Powell, attorney, independent candidate for U.S. Senator in 1950
- Robert W. Upton, incumbent U.S. Senator

==== Results ====
Republican primary results
Party	Candidate	Votes	%
Republican	Norris Cotton	29.761	40.63
Republican	Robert W. Upton	23,778	32.47
Republican	Wesley Powell	19,704	26.90
Total votes		73,243	100.00

== General election ==
=== Results ===
1954 United States Senate special election in New Hampshire
Party	Candidate	Votes	%
Republican	Norris Cotton	114,068	60.18
Democratic	Stanley J. Betley	75,490	39.82
Majority		38,578	20.36
Turnout		189,558	
Republican hold			

== See also ==
- 1954 United States Senate elections

== Bibliography ==
- Congressional Elections, 1946-1996. Washington, D.C.: Congressional Quarterly Inc. 1998. ISBN 1-56802-248-4.
- Fuller, Enoch D., ed. (1955). Manual for the General Court of New Hampshire. Vol. 34. Concord, NH: Department of State, New Hampshire.
