= Harrison Thyng =

United States Air Force general and flying ace

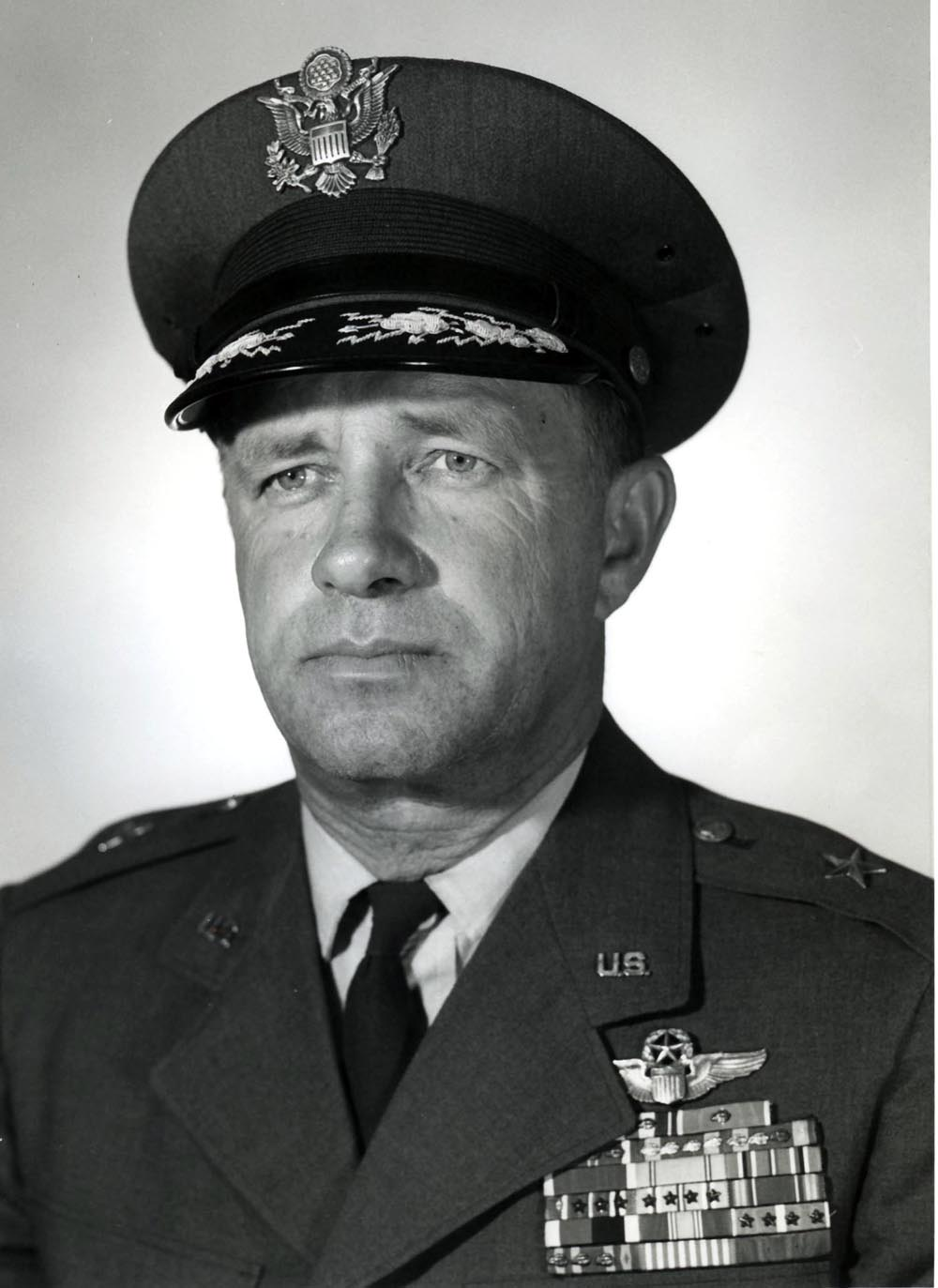
- Official portrait, 1966
- Born: Harrison Reed Thyng; April 12, 1918; Laconia, New Hampshire, U.S.
- Died: September 24, 1983 (aged 65); Pittsfield, New Hampshire, U.S.
- Burial place: Riverview Cemetery; Barnstead, New Hampshire
- Military career
- Allegiance: United States of America
- Branch: United States Air Force
- Service years: 1940–1966
- Rank: Brigadier General
- Nickname: "Harry"
- Units: 31st Fighter Group; 413th Fighter Group; 4th Fighter-Interceptor Wing
- Conflicts: World War II; Operation Jubilee; Dieppe Raid; Operation Torch; Battle of Kasserine Pass; Korean War
- Awards: Silver Star (3); Legion of Merit (2); Distinguished Flying Cross (5); Air Medal (33); Purple Heart
- Other work: US Senate candidate from New Hampshire

Brigadier General Harrison Reed Thyng (April 12, 1918 – September 24, 1983) was a fighter pilot and a general in the United States Air Force (USAF). He is notable as one of only six USAF fighter pilots to be recognized as an ace in two wars. On retiring from the military, Thyng became a New Hampshire candidate to the United States Senate.

== Early life ==
Born in Laconia, New Hampshire, the second of two sons of Herbert and Elizabeth Thyng, "Harry" Thyng was raised in Barnstead. He was educated in a rural school system, attending a "one-room" school through the 8th Grade, then attending Pittsfield High School. He was an avid athlete, participating in football, baseball and track, in all of which he lettered, and graduated in 1935.

Thyng obtained a Bachelor of Arts pre-law degree from the University of New Hampshire in 1939. An ROTC graduate, he was given a reserve commission as a second lieutenant, Infantry, at graduation but enlisted in the U.S. Army Air Corps as a flying cadet. He trained at Parks Air College near East St. Louis, Illinois, for primary, Randolph Field for basic, and Kelly Field for advanced, where he obtained his wings and commission in the Air Corps on March 23, 1940. His first assignment was as a pursuit pilot with the 94th Pursuit Squadron, 1st Pursuit Group, at Selfridge Field, Michigan.

The personnel of the 1st Pursuit Group provided cadre and instructors for new pursuit groups being mobilized by the U.S. Army Air Forces in preparation for World War II. One of these new groups was the 31st Pursuit Group, the first to be equipped with the Bell P-39 Airacobra. On October 10 he was transferred to the 41st Pursuit Squadron of the newly activated 31st Pursuit Group, then promoted to 1st lieutenant on November 1, 1941.

== World War II ==
=== Operations in Europe ===
After the United States entered the war, several squadrons of the 35th Pursuit Group in the Philippines became total losses in combat and the newly trained squadrons of the 31st PG, including the 41st PS, were detached on January 15, 1942, to form the core of a new 35th Group and moved to the West Coast for immediate deployment to the Pacific. The U.S. Army Air Forces then created three new squadrons to become the flying units of the 31st fighting Group On January 30, 1942, 1st Lt. Thyng became the first commanding officer of the newly created 309th Fighter Squadron, 31st Fighter Group. Initially equipped with Curtiss P-40B Warhawk fighters, the 309th FS relocated to New Orleans to transition to the P-39, and trained during the spring of 1942 for deployment overseas to England. Thyng was promoted to captain on April 4. In May, it staged to Grenier Field, New Hampshire, to train for long-distance over-water flights using drop tanks, for which the P-39 was found to be unsuitable.

The headquarters and ground echelon of the 309th FS shipped out to England on June 4, 1942, aboard HMS Queen Elizabeth as part of Operation Bolero. Arriving at its new base at High Ercall without aircraft on June 11, the squadron began flight training on Spitfire V fighters provided by the RAF beginning June 26. Its RAF instructors declared the 31st FG ready for operations in late July, the first U.S. combat group to be so rated. On July 26, the group headquarters and its three-squadron commanders, including Major Thyng, flew a combat mission with No. 412 Squadron (RCAF) based at RAF Biggin Hill, a fighter sweep near Saint-Omer, France, that resulted in the loss of one 31st FG Spitfire.

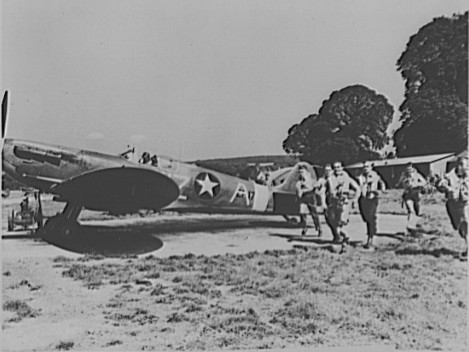
Thyng's Spitfire VB "WZ-A", named Mary & James, in 1942

Thyng's 309th FS was relocated twice, first to RAF Warmwell, Dorset, in late July, and then to RAF Westhampnett, Sussex, on August 4, where it became operational, flying its first operational mission the next day. Its scheduled missions were "Rodeos", feints to decoy German fighter opposition, and convoy escorts, but on August 9 Major Thyng and a wingman flew a defensive patrol over the English Channel in which Thyng claimed a Junkers Ju 88 damaged, the first claim by a U.S. fighter during the war. His personal aircraft was a Spitfire V he nicknamed Mary & James after his wife and son, bearing the squadron identification codes WZ—A.

On August 19, 1942, the 31st Fighter Group flew eleven missions and 123 sorties in support of Operation Jubilee, the Allied raid on Dieppe, France. There it encountered its first opposition from Luftwaffe fighters and recorded its first kills. Thyng was granted a "probable" kill of an Fw 190 and was awarded the Silver Star for flying top cover for a rescue mission of a downed 31st FG pilot.

On August 20 the 309th FS conducted the first American escort mission for U.S. B-17 Flying Fortress bombers, and on August 29 the 31st FG flew its first group mission. The 31st flew several days of escort missions for U.S. Douglas A-20 light bombers at the beginning of September, and then stood down from operations except for defensive reactions until a final escort mission on October 2, its last before transferring to the Twelfth Air Force.

On October 26, 1942, the 31st shipped its Spitfires by sea to Gibraltar, to provide air support for Operation Torch as part of the Twelfth Air Force.

=== North African combat ===
The advanced command post of the Twelfth Air Force ordered two squadrons of the 31st Fighter Group to fly into Tafaraoui Airfield near Oran, newly captured by the U.S. 1st Infantry Division. 24 Spitfires of the 308th and 309th FS, including Major Thyng, took off from Gibraltar at 15:40. They arrived in Algeria at 17:00 and observed four aircraft circling overhead, mistakenly identified as RAF Hawker Hurricanes. The 12 Spitfires of the 308th FS landed without incident but as the 309th began landing, it was attacked by the four aircraft, now seen to be Vichy French Dewoitine D.520 fighters. A 309th Spitfire was shot down and its pilot killed. Major Thyng and two other 31st FG pilots counter-attacked and shot down three of the four D.520's. (USAF Historical Study No. 105, Air Phase of the North African Invasion, November 1942, Thomas J. Mayock)

The 31st deployed to a forward base at Thelepte, Tunisia, which it temporarily evacuated during the German breakthrough at the Battle of the Kasserine Pass. Thyng won a second Silver Star attacking German armored forces during the battle and was shot down twice, once by British anti-aircraft fire. Suffering a broken ankle during his recovery from the shoot down by the latter, Thyng continued flying with the aid of a sling rigged by his crew chief to enable him to operate the Spitfire's rudder.

Thyng officially was credited with shooting down 4 Bf 109 fighters while commanding the 309th to be recognized as an ace on May 6, 1943. Thyng, promoted to lieutenant colonel in February, moved up to second-in-command of the 31st Fighter Group on May 12, 1943, and continued operations until wounded in action. Lt. Col. Thyng officially was credited with 162 combat sorties and 5 planes destroyed. Although many unofficial accounts credit him with as many as eight kills, including an Italian fighter, only five are recognized officially by the Air Force (USAF Historical Study No. 85, USAF Credits for Destruction of Enemy Aircraft, World War II, Wesley P. Newton et al.).

=== Duty in the Central Pacific ===
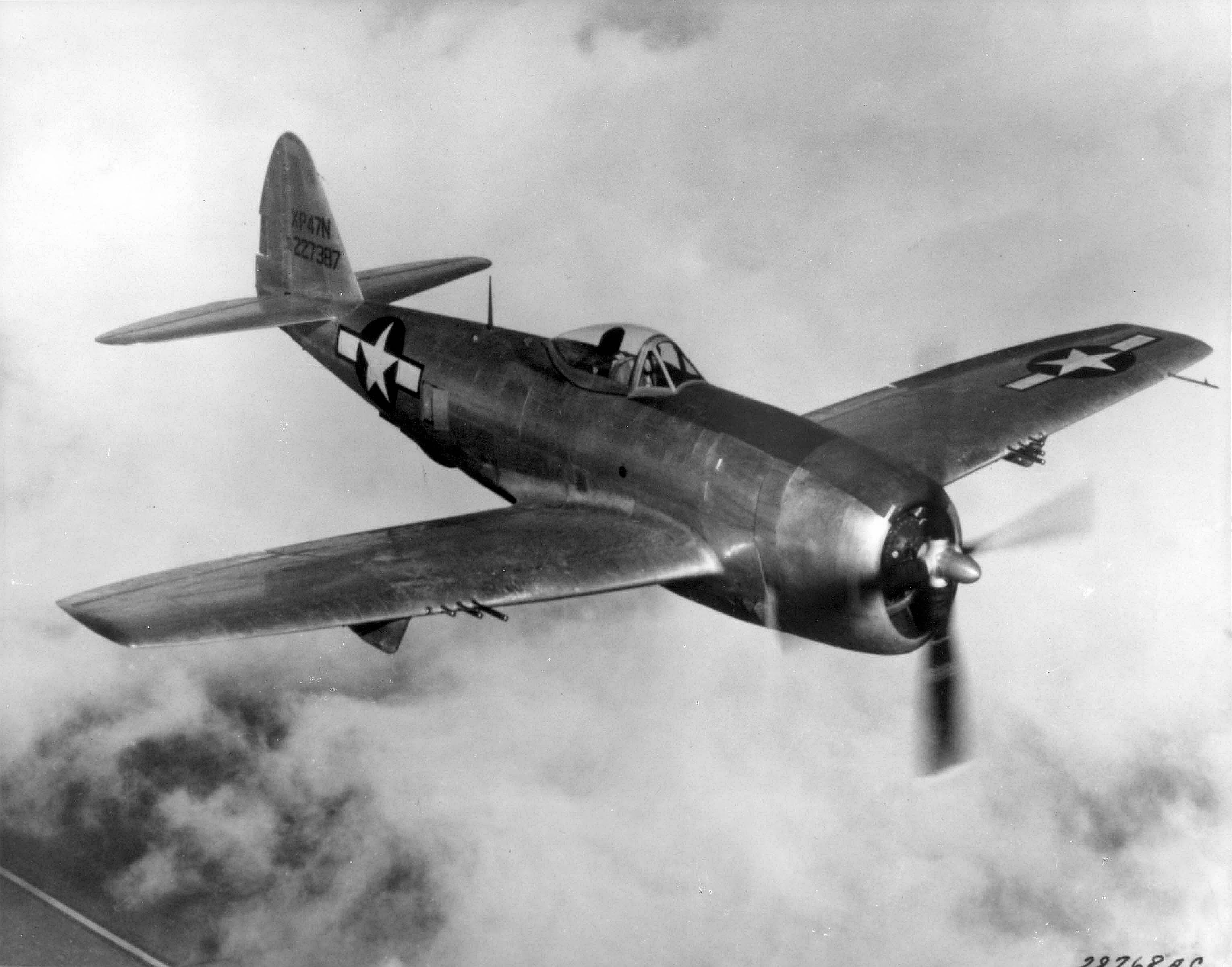
Republic P-47N Thunderbolt

Thyng was promoted to full colonel at the age of 26 and returned to the United States, where on November 1, 1944, he was made commander of the 413th Fighter Group at Bluethenthal Field, North Carolina. This group, consisting of Republic P-47N Thunderbolt fighters, trained for long-range escort operations for B-29 bombers of the Twentieth Air Force.

On May 19, 1945, the group deployed to the Pacific. It conducted several strafing missions from Saipan to the Caroline Islands in May before beginning operations from Ie Shima in June. The group engaged in dive-bombing and strafing attacks on factories, radar stations, airfields, small ships, and other targets in Japan, and made several attacks on shipping and airfields in China during July. Thyng's group flew its sole B-29 escort mission on August 8, 1945, to Yawata, Japan.

Col. Thyng is credited with 22 sorties but despite some accounts asserting that he shot down one of the 16 Japanese aircraft credited to his group, he was not awarded any kills in this theater and the credit is likely based on submission of a "probable". Col. Thyng remained in command of the 413th FG until October 14, 1945.

== USAF career ==
Col. Thyng was granted a commission in the Regular Army in 1946 and in the United States Air Force on September 18, 1947, when that service became an independent arm. From September 1947 through May 1950, he served as an instructor for the Air National Guard and was instrumental in the founding of the Air Guard in the states of Maine, Vermont, and his home state of New Hampshire.

On June 15, 1950, Col. Thyng was named commander of the 33rd Fighter-Interceptor Group, flying North American F-86 Sabres from Otis Air Force Base, Massachusetts, and moved up to command its parent 33rd Fighter-Interceptor Wing in April 1951.

=== Korean War duty ===
Thyng deployed to Kimpo Air Base, South Korea in October 1951 and while still on unassigned duty recorded his first MiG-15 kill on October 24, 1951, flying with the 4th Fighter-Interceptor Wing. Leading a flight of F-86 Sabres, Thyng attacked a formation of 11 MiGs and hit the leader, causing him to eject. Thyng was made commander of the wing on November 1, 1951, at a period of time when United Nations air superiority over North Korea was being severely challenged by the communist forces.

His first severe test as commander came in January 1952 when the activation of a second F-86 wing resulted in a serious shortage of fuel wing tanks and replacement parts, dropping in-commission rates to 55%. Thyng, going over the heads of the chain of command, warned USAF Chief of Staff General Hoyt Vandenberg that "I can no longer be responsible for air superiority in northwest Korea" because of an inability to field sufficient numbers of F-86s to conduct combat operations. The situation was rapidly addressed by the Air Force as a result and in-commission rates rose to greater than 75%.

The spring of 1952 saw a surge in the destruction of MiGs by both F-86 wings in Korea, but particularly in the 4th FIW. Flying with the 335th Fighter-Interceptor Squadron, Col. Thyng recorded four additional MiG kills to become a jet ace on May 20, 1952, and was awarded his third Silver Star. Kenneth P. Werrell, in his study Sabres over MiG Alley, states that Thyng's kills in March and April likely took place over China. He cites RAF Air Marshal Sir John M. Nicholls KCB CBE DFC AFC, then a flight lieutenant exchange pilot with the 4th FIW, as stating Thyng sent him low over the primary MiG base at Antung "to stir them up" and then shot down a reacting MiG-15 after it had taken off. He next quotes USAF Lt. Gen. Charles G. Cleveland, then a 1st lieutenant in the 335th FIS, as being in a flight led by Thyng that resulted in a shoot down north of Mukden, although the claim submission placed the location at the mouth of the Yalu River.

Col. Thyng commanded the 4th FIW through October 2, 1952, and flew 114 missions. Although credited with the destruction of five MiGs, many accounts assert that after his 5th jet credit he began giving claims for his shoot-downs to his wingmen. Thyng flew a number of aircraft during his Korean tour, but his personal aircraft was F-86E 50-0623 which carried the nickname Pretty Mary and the J's, after his family, on the lower portion of the nose.

After his return to the United States, Col. Thyng had a succession of assignments with the Air Defense Command and NORAD. He served as deputy of operations for the Western Air Defense Area, as vice commander and commander of an ADC Air Division, and after promotion to brigadier general in May 1963, as vice commander of NORAD North Region at CFB North Bay, Ontario. He also saw duty in Headquarters USAF and with the Federal Aviation Agency.

In 1966, just prior to his retirement, Gen. Thyng observed the testing of air-to-air missiles in Southeast Asia and flew several combat sorties. He retired from the Air Force on April 1, 1966, to go into politics. Gen. Thyng had over 650 hours of combat flight time on 307 sorties in three wars, with 10 aircraft officially credited shot down and another 6 unofficially attributed to him. Gen. Thyng had operational experience flying the P-40, P-39, Spitfire Vb, P-47N, F-80, F-84, F-86, F-89, F-94, F-100, F-102, and F-106 fighter aircraft.

== 1966 Senate campaign ==
In 1966 Thyng ran as the Republican Party candidate for the United States Senate seat from New Hampshire held by Thomas J. McIntyre. He prevailed in a crowded Republican primary that included former governors Lane Dwinell and Wesley Powell, Party chair William R. Johnson, and Doloris Bridges, widow of 25-year U.S. Senator Styles Bridges. In the general election, McIntyre was a strong supporter of President Lyndon B. Johnson's Vietnam War policy, neutralizing much of Thyng's appeal as a conservative and a hawk. Because of financial support from H. L. Hunt and others, and his position on the war, Thyng was successfully painted as a far-right candidate and was defeated by 18,647 votes.

== Retirement ==
Thyng and his wife, Mary Evans Thyng, whom he married on March 23, 1940 (the day of his commissioning), retired to Pittsfield, New Hampshire.

Thyng founded the New England Aeronautical Institute in 1965, which later merged with Daniel Webster Junior College to become Daniel Webster College in Nashua, New Hampshire, and served as its first president. He retired to Pittsfield, New Hampshire.

Thyng died of heart attack on September 24, 1983, at the age of 65.

On July 17, 2004, a memorial to General Thyng was dedicated in Pittsfield by the Pittsfield Historical Society, with United States Senator Judd Gregg; General Ronald Fogleman, former Chief of Staff of the United States Air Force; Lt Gen Daniel James III, Director of the Air National Guard; and Maj Gen John Blair, New Hampshire National Guard, in attendance.

== Awards and decorations ==
Thyng's awards and decorations include:

US Air Force Command Pilot Badge

Silver Star with two bronze oak leaf clusters
Legion of Merit with bronze oak leaf cluster
Distinguished Flying Cross with three bronze oak leaf clusters
Purple Heart
Air Medal with four silver oak leaf clusters
Air Medal with two silver and one bronze oak leaf cluster (second ribbon required for accouterment spacing)
Air Force Commendation Medal
Air Force Presidential Unit Citation
American Defense Service Medal
American Campaign Medal
European-African-Middle Eastern Campaign Medal with one silver and three bronze service stars
Asiatic-Pacific Campaign Medal with four bronze campaign stars
World War II Victory Medal
Army of Occupation Medal with 'Japan' clasp
National Defense Service Medal with service star
Korean Service Medal with four bronze campaign stars
Air Force Longevity Service Award with silver oak leaf cluster
Croix de Guerre with Palm (France)
Republic of Korea Presidential Unit Citation
United Nations Service Medal for Korea
Korean War Service Medal

== Aerial victory credits ==
Gen. Thyng is one of six USAF pilots and seven U.S. pilots overall who achieved ace status as both a piston-engined pilot in World War II and as a jet pilot in a later conflict (the others are Col. Francis S. Gabreski, Col. James P. Hagerstrom, Major William T. Whisner, Col. Vermont Garrison, Major George A. Davis, Jr., and Lt.Col. John F. Bolt, USMC), and the only one to achieve flag-general officer rank. His credited victories:

Date	Type	Location	Aircraft flown	Unit
November 8, 1942	Dewoitine D.520	Tafaraoui, Algeria	Spitfire Vb	309 FS, 31 FG
February 15, 1943	Bf 109	Thelepte, Tunisia	Spitfire Vb	309 FS, 31 FG
March 29, 1943	Bf 109	Tunisia	Spitfire Vb	309 FS, 31 FG
April 1, 1943	Bf 109	Tunisia	Spitfire Vb	309 FS, 31 FG
May 6, 1943	Bf 109	Tunis, Tunisia	Spitfire Vb	309 FS, 31 FG
October 24, 1951	MiG-15	North Korea	F-86E	4 FIW
December 14, 1951	MiG-15	North Korea	F-86E	4 FIW
March 10, 1952	MiG-15	Dandong, China?	F-86E	335 FIS, 4 FIW
April 18, 1952	MiG-15	Shenyang, China?	F-86E	335 FIS, 4 FIW
May 20, 1952	MiG-15	North Korea	F-86E	4 FIW
Sources: Air Force Historical Study 85: USAF Credits for the Destruction of Enemy Aircraft, World War II and Air Force Historical Study 81: USAF Credits for the Destruction of Enemy Aircraft, Korean War

Party political offices
Preceded by Perkins Bass	Republican nominee for U.S. Senator from New Hampshire (Class 2); 1966	Succeeded by Wesley Powell
