= Maurice J. Murphy Jr. =

American politician

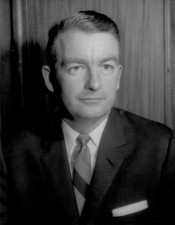

Member of the New Hampshire Boundary Commission
- In office July 17, 1973 – March 1, 1975
- Appointed by: Meldrim Thomson Jr.
- Preceded by: Position established
- Succeeded by: Position abolished

United States Senator from New Hampshire
- In office December 7, 1961 – November 6, 1962
- Appointed by: Wesley Powell
- Preceded by: Styles Bridges
- Succeeded by: Thomas J. McIntyre

17th Attorney General of New Hampshire
- In office November 4, 1961 – December 7, 1961
- Governor: Wesley Powell
- Preceded by: William Maynard
- Succeeded by: George S. Pappagianis

Personal details
- Born: Maurice James Murphy Jr. October 3, 1927 Dover, New Hampshire, U.S.
- Died: October 27, 2002 (aged 75) Stratham, New Hampshire, U.S.
- Party: Republican
- Spouse: Mary E. Doody
- Education: College of the Holy Cross (BS); Boston College (JD)

Military service
- Branch/service: United States Army
- Years of service: 1946–1947; 1953–1954
- Rank: Private First Class

Maurice James Murphy Jr. (October 3, 1927 – October 27, 2002) was an American politician and lawyer from New Hampshire. He was (for one month) the New Hampshire Attorney General and (for eleven months) an appointed United States Senator.

== Early life and education ==
Murphy was born in Dover, New Hampshire and graduated from Dover High School and St. Mary's Academy. He graduated from the College of the Holy Cross in 1950 and from Boston College Law School in 1953. Murphy was admitted to the bar and commenced the practice of law in Portsmouth in 1955. He served as an enlisted man in the United States Army in 1946 and 1947 and again in 1953 and 1954.

== Legal and political career ==
Murphy was legal counsel to the New Hampshire Senate in 1957–1958, and administrative assistant to Governor Wesley Powell from 1959 to 1961. After serving as deputy attorney general for several months, Murphy was appointed by Governor Powell as New Hampshire Attorney General, and took office on November 4, 1961. Three weeks later, the longest-serving U.S. Senator, conservative Republican Styles Bridges, died in office. On December 7, 1961, Governor Powell appointed Murphy as U.S. Senator, to fill the vacancy until a November 1962 special election. Powell's choice of Murphy was controversial; powerful publisher William Loeb published a front-page editorial in the Manchester Union Leader attacking Powell for passing over the late Senator's widow Doloris. Many political observers expected that Mrs. Bridges would be appointed to her husband's seat. Murphy voted in favor of the 24th Amendment to the U.S. Constitution.

Murphy ran in the 1962 election in an effort to keep his seat. However, Murphy was challenged in the primary by Doloris Bridges, Congressman Perkins Bass, and Congressman Chester Merrow. Murphy finished third behind Bass and Mrs. Bridges. Governor Powell, too, was defeated in that primary, and in his election night speech, he referenced Loeb's opposition and added that "I'm paying the penalty for appointing a Catholic to the U.S. Senate."

Murphy later served on the Portsmouth Economic Commission, Portsmouth Housing Authority and was elected chairman of the board of the Portsmouth-Kittery Armed Services Committee (now called the Seacoast Shipyard Association). He served on the New Hampshire Boundary Commission from 1973 to 1975.

== Later life and death ==
Murphy then resumed the practice of law. He was chairman of the board and general counsel of the Portsmouth (N.H.) Savings Bank from 1968 to 1988. At the time of his death in 2002, he resided in Stratham, New Hampshire. He was interred in Prospect Hill Cemetery in Greenland, New Hampshire.

== Personal life ==
Murphy was married to Mary E. Doody, who died in 2016.

Legal offices
Preceded by William Maynard	Attorney General of New Hampshire; November 4, 1961 – December 7, 1961	Succeeded by George S. Pappagianis
U.S. Senate
Preceded by Styles Bridges	U.S. senator (Class 2) from New Hampshire; December 7, 1961 – November 6, 1962; Served alongside: Norris Cotton	Succeeded by Thomas J. McIntyre
Honorary titles
Preceded by John Tower	Baby of the Senate; December 7, 1961 – November 6, 1962	Succeeded by Ted Kennedy
