= Norris Cotton =

American politician (1900–1989)

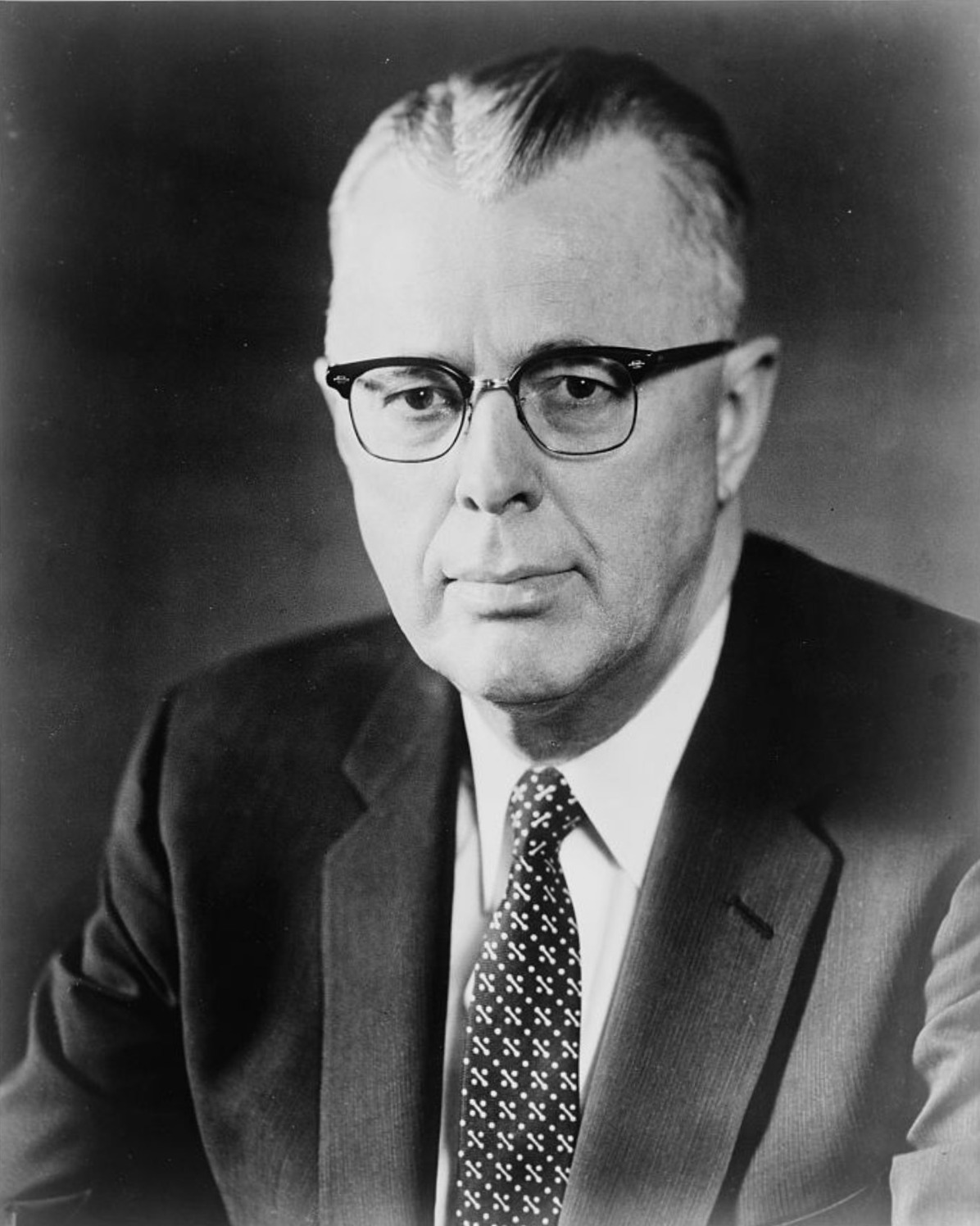

United States Senator from New Hampshire
- In office August 8, 1975 – September 18, 1975
- Appointed by: Meldrim Thomson Jr.
- Preceded by: Louis C. Wyman
- Succeeded by: John A. Durkin
- In office November 8, 1954 – December 31, 1974
- Preceded by: Robert W. Upton
- Succeeded by: Louis C. Wyman

Chair of the Senate Republican Conference
- In office January 3, 1973 – January 3, 1975
- Preceded by: Margaret Chase Smith
- Succeeded by: Carl Curtis

Member of the U.S. House of Representatives from New Hampshire's 2nd district
- In office January 3, 1947 – November 7, 1954
- Preceded by: Sherman Adams
- Succeeded by: Perkins Bass

Speaker of the New Hampshire House of Representatives
- In office 1945–1947
- Preceded by: Sherman Adams
- Succeeded by: J. Walker Wiggin

Member of the New Hampshire House of Representatives
- In office 1923–1923
- In office 1943–1947

Personal details
- Born: May 11, 1900 Warren, New Hampshire, U.S.
- Died: February 24, 1989 (aged 88) Lebanon, New Hampshire, U.S.
- Party: Republican
- Spouses: Ruth Isaacs (m. 1927; died 1978) Eleanor Coolidge Brown (m. 1980)
- Children: 1
- Education: Wesleyan University; George Washington University Law School
- Occupation: Lawyer; politician

Norris Henry Cotton (May 11, 1900 – February 24, 1989) was an American politician from the state of New Hampshire. A member of the Republican Party, he served as a U.S. representative and subsequently as a U.S. senator.

== Early life ==
Cotton was born on a farm in Warren, New Hampshire, and was educated at Phillips Exeter Academy in New Hampshire and Wesleyan University in Connecticut. He was the son of Henry Lang and Elizabeth (née Moses) Cotton. While in college, he served as a clerk to the New Hampshire State Senate. He also served as a member of the New Hampshire House of Representatives in 1923 as one of the youngest legislators in history. He became a lawyer after attending George Washington University Law School and practiced law in Lebanon, New Hampshire.

== Career ==
Cotton was elected to the New Hampshire House of Representatives again in 1943, and served as majority leader that year and as Speaker from 1945 to 1947.

In 1946, Cotton was elected to the United States House of Representatives from New Hampshire's 2nd congressional district for the first time. He served until 1954, when he ran for a seat in the United States Senate from New Hampshire in a special election to fill the vacancy caused by the death of incumbent Senator Charles W. Tobey. He was elected to a full term in 1956, reelected twice and served in the Senate until 1975.

His appointment to the House Appropriations Committee in his third term belies his relative public inactivity. None of his eleven bills in eight years were enacted; he was successful with three of his six floor amendments, addressing truck safety, the Defense Production Act, and agricultural funding. Noteworthy is his comment about his frustration with the legislative process:

It is not so much the size and complications of government that baffle a new congressman, as it is the fact that he finds himself constantly handcuffed by the legislative process. He rarely has the opportunity to vote for what he wants, but nearly always has to take the lesser of two evils – and then try to explain the whys and wherefores to his constituents. Thus, during one fateful month, I voted for a compulsory Selective Service bill I disliked, a tax bill I detested, and a price-and-wage-control bill I abominated.

Cotton voted in favor of the Civil Rights Acts of 1957, 1960, and 1968, as well as the 24th Amendment to the U.S. Constitution, the Voting Rights Act of 1965, and the confirmation of Thurgood Marshall to the U.S. Supreme Court, but against the Civil Rights Act of 1964 and the Immigration and Nationality Act of 1965. Cotton was the only New England senator do so. Cotton was one of thirteen Republican senators to vote in favor of Medicare. He was a prominent leader of his party in the Senate, chairing the Senate Republican Conference from 1973 to 1975. He did not run for reelection in 1974. Three days before his final term ran out, Cotton resigned to allow the governor to appoint Louis C. Wyman.

Cotton returned to the Senate in August 1975 after the election of his successor was contested. The closest Senate election in history, it went through two recounts at the state level, followed by protracted debate on the Senate floor, until both candidates agreed to a special election. Cotton served as a temporary senator until the September 1975 special election, the result of which was not challenged; Cotton returned to Lebanon, New Hampshire. Cotton was the last senator to return to the senate via appointment for 43 years until Arizona's former Senator Jon Kyl was appointed by Governor Doug Ducey in 2018 following the death of Senator John McCain.

== Death and legacy ==
Cotton died on February 24, 1989, in Lebanon, aged 88. He is interred at School Street Cemetery in Lebanon.

The Norris Cotton Cancer Care Pavilion at Dartmouth Hitchcock Medical Center in Lebanon is named for him, and a federal building in Manchester also bears his name. There is a New Hampshire historical marker (number 231) in Warren, unveiled in 2012, which says that his rise from humble beginnings "embodied an American way of life."

== Family life ==
He had a daughter, Mary Martha Ballou, on February 15, 1925. He married Ruth Isaacs on May 11, 1927. They had no children. Ruth died in 1978, and he married his housekeeper, Eleanor Coolidge Brown, in 1980.

Political offices
Preceded by Sherman Adams	Speaker of the New Hampshire House of Representatives; 1945–1947	Succeeded by J. Walker Wiggin
U.S. House of Representatives
Preceded by Sherman Adams	Member of the U.S. House of Representatives from New Hampshire's 2nd congressional district 1947 – 1954	Succeeded by Perkins Bass
Party political offices
Preceded by Charles W. Tobey	Republican nominee for U.S. Senator from New Hampshire (Class 3); 1954, 1956, 1962, 1968	Succeeded by Louis C. Wyman
Preceded by Margaret Chase Smith	Chair of the Senate Republican Conference; 1973–1975	Succeeded by Carl Curtis
U.S. Senate
Preceded by Robert W. Upton	U.S. senator (Class 3) from New Hampshire; November 8, 1954 – December 31, 1974; Served alongside: Styles Bridges, Maurice J. Murphy, Jr., Thomas J. McIntyre	Succeeded by Louis C. Wyman
Preceded by Louis C. Wyman	U.S. senator (Class 3) from New Hampshire; August 8, 1975 – September 18, 1975; Served alongside: Thomas J. McIntyre	Succeeded by John A. Durkin
Preceded by John Marshall Butler	Ranking Member of the Senate Commerce Committee; 1963–1975	Succeeded by James B. Pearson
