= William J. Crockett =

American diplomat

- Born: July 22, 1914
- Died: March 18, 1999 (aged 84)
- Occupation: United States Diplomat
- Known for: He created the Crockett reforms.

William J. Crockett (July 22, 1914 – March 18, 1999) was a United States diplomat and official in the United States Department of State.

== Biography ==
William J. Crockett joined the United States Foreign Service in 1951 and became a Foreign Service Officer a short time later. He spent 1954-58 as an FSO in Rome.

After six years as an FSO, President of the United States John F. Kennedy appointed Crockett Assistant Secretary of State for Administration, with Crockett holding this office from February 23, 1961, until June 7, 1963. He became Deputy Under Secretary of State for Management in June 1963, holding this office until January 1967.

Shortly after his appointment as Assistant Secretary, United States Attorney General Robert F. Kennedy had tasked Crockett with introducing business management techniques to the United States Department of State, as had been recommended by the Commission on National Goals, chaired by Henry Wriston. The so-called "Crockett reforms" that he introduced were ambitious, but met resistance, and were largely seen as a failure.

Government offices
Preceded by Lane Dwinell	Assistant Secretary of State for Administration; February 23, 1961 – June 7, 1963	Succeeded by Dwight J. Porter
