= 1984 United States Senate election in New Hampshire =

- November 6, 1984
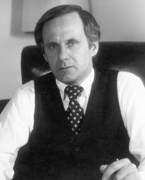

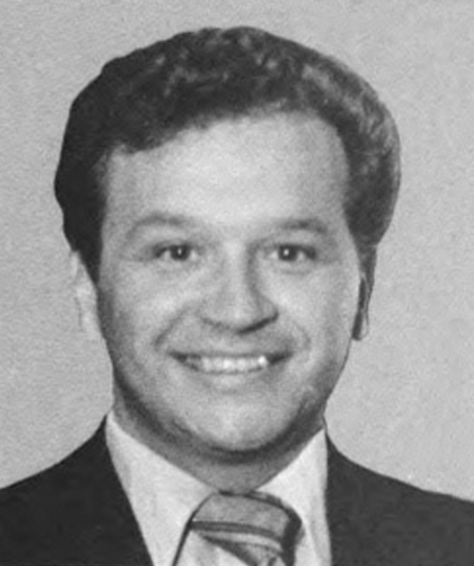
Nominee	Gordon J. Humphrey	Norman D'Amours
Party	Republican	Democratic
Popular vote	225,828	157,447
Percentage	58.75%	40.96%
- Humphrey: 50–60% 60–70% 70–80% 80–90% >90% D'Amours: 50–60% 60–70% 80–90% >90%
U.S. senator before election
Gordon J. Humphrey
Republican
Elected U.S. Senator
Gordon J. Humphrey
Republican

The 1984 United States Senate election in New Hampshire was held on November 6, 1984.

Senator Gordon Humphrey was re-elected to a second term in office.

== Republican primary ==
=== Candidates ===
- Gordon J. Humphrey, incumbent Senator

=== Results ===
Senator Humphrey was unopposed for re-nomination by the Republican Party.

== Democratic primary ==
=== Candidates ===
- Norman D'Amours, U.S. Representative from New Hampshire's 1st congressional district

=== Results ===
Representative D'Amours was unopposed for the Democratic nomination.

== Independents and third parties ==
=== Libertarian ===
- Saunder "Sandy" Primack

== General election ==
=== Campaign ===
During the campaign, D'Amours accused Humphrey of being "ultraconservative." Humphrey, long considered a target for Senate Democrats, may have been helped by his support of environmental programs, including an increase for Superfund spending.

=== Results ===
General election results
Party	Candidate	Votes	%	±%
Republican	Gordon J. Humphrey (incumbent)	225,828	58.75%	▲8.04
Democratic	Norman D'Amours	157,447	40.96%	▼7.55
Libertarian	Saunder Primack	1,094	0.29%	▼0.50
Total votes		384,369	100.00%	
Republican hold				

== See also ==
- 1984 United States Senate elections
