= 2000 New Hampshire gubernatorial election =

- November 7, 2000
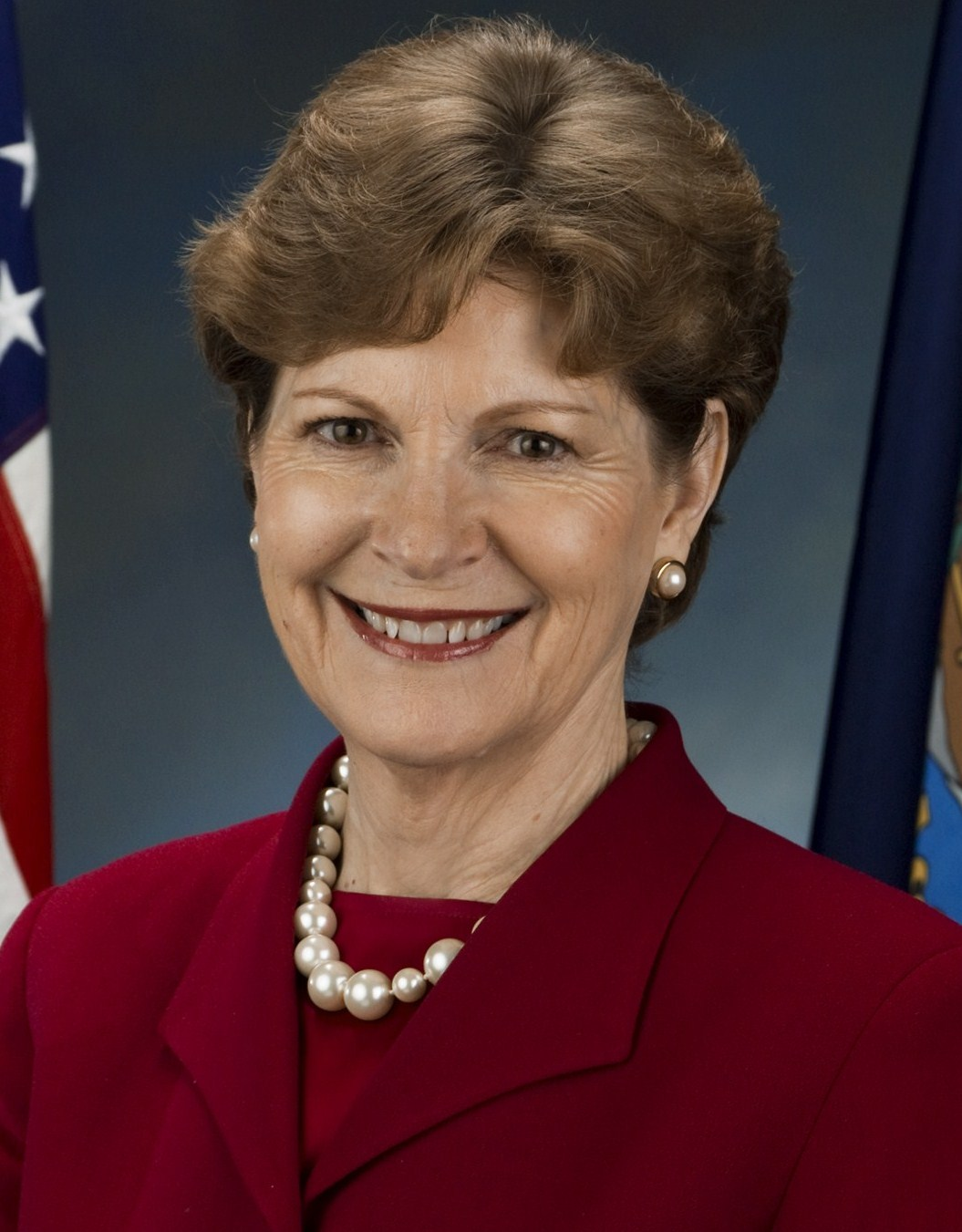

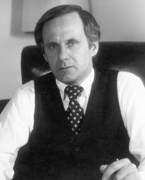

Nominee	Jeanne Shaheen	Gordon Humphrey	Mary Brown
Party	Democratic	Republican	Independent
Popular vote	275,038	246,952	35,904
Percentage	48.74%	43.76%	6.36%
- Shaheen: 40–50% 50–60% 60–70% Humphrey: 40–50% 50–60% 60–70% 70–80% 80–90% >90% Tie: 40–50%
Governor before election
Jeanne Shaheen
Democratic
Elected Governor
Jeanne Shaheen
Democratic

The 2000 New Hampshire gubernatorial election took place on November 7, 2000. Democratic incumbent Jeanne Shaheen was re-elected to a third term in office over former U.S. senator Gordon J. Humphrey.

== Democratic primary ==
=== Candidates ===
- Mark Fernald, state senator from Sharon
- Jeanne Shaheen, incumbent governor of New Hampshire since 1997

=== Results ===
Democratic primary results
Party	Candidate	Votes	%
Democratic	Jeanne Shaheen (incumbent)	45,249	60.41
Democratic	Mark Fernald	28,488	38.03
Democratic	Write-ins	1,164	1.55
Total votes		74,901	100.00

== Republican primary ==
=== Candidates ===
- Fred Bramante, perennial candidate
- Jeffrey R. Howard, former New Hampshire attorney general and former U.S. attorney for the District of New Hampshire
- Gordon J. Humphrey, former U.S. senator
- Jim Marron
- Jim Squires, former state senator

=== Results ===
Republican primary results
Party	Candidate	Votes	%
Republican	Gordon Humphrey	54,134	51.86
Republican	Jim Squires	23,582	22.59
Republican	Jeffrey R. Howard	21,734	20.82
Republican	Fred Bramante	2,500	2.39
Republican	Write-ins	1,851	1.77
Republican	Jim Marron	584	0.56
Total votes		104,385	100.00

== Campaign ==
=== Candidates ===
- John J. Babiarz (Libertarian)
- Mary Brown, former state senator (Independent)
- Gordon J. Humphrey, former U.S. senator (Republican)
- Jeanne Shaheen, incumbent governor of New Hampshire since 1997 (Democratic)

=== Debates ===
- Complete video of debate, September 25, 2000
- Complete video of debate, October 2, 2000
- Complete video of debate, October 26, 2000
- Complete video of debate, October 31, 2000

=== Polling ===
Poll source	Date(s)	Sample size	Margin of error	Jeanne Shaheen (D)	Gordon Humphrey (R)	Other / undecided (Note: Calculated by taking the difference of 100% and all other candidates combined.)
Harris Insights & Analytics	November 3, 2000	1,388	—	48%	40%	12%
University of New Hampshire Survey Center	November 3, 2000	801	—	43%	37%	20%
American Research Group	November 1, 2000	600	—	43%	44%	13%
Research 2000	October 31, 2000	600	—	51%	42%	7%
Franklin Pierce University Marlin Fitzwater Center for Communication	October 24, 2000	885	—	51%	30%	19%
Rasmussen Reports	October 22, 2000	1,338	—	45%	40%	15%
Research 2000	October 17, 2000	600	—	49%	41%	10%

=== Results ===
New Hampshire gubernatorial election, 2000
Party	Candidate	Votes	%	±%
Democratic	Jeanne Shaheen (incumbent)	275,038	48.74%	−17.34%
Republican	Gordon J. Humphrey	246,952	43.76%	+12.88%
Independent	Mary Brown	35,904	6.36%	
Libertarian	John J. Babiarz	6,446	1.14%	−1.57%
Majority		28,086	4.98%	−30.23%
Turnout		564,340		
Democratic hold		Swing		

==== Results by county ====
County	Jeanne Shaheen Democratic		Gordon Humphrey Republican		Mary Brown Independent		John Babiarz Libertarian		Margin		Total votes cast
County	#	%	#	%	#	%	#	%	#	%	Total votes cast
Belknap	11,994	44.6%	12,980	48.3%	1,664	6.2%	208	0.9%	-986	-3.7%	26,867
Carroll	10,363	43.9%	11,691	49.5%	1,260	5.3%	188	1.3%	-1,328	-5.6%	23,618
Cheshire	17,734	53.7%	12,554	38.0%	2,245	6.8%	478	1.5%	5,180	15.7%	33,053
Coös	7,011	48.2%	6,470	44.5%	896	6.2%	156	1.1%	541	3.8%	14,537
Grafton	18,425	48.3%	17,030	44.6%	2,066	5.4%	609	1.7%	1,395	1.7%	38,178
Hillsborough	78,522	47.6%	75,067	45.5%	9,523	5.8%	1,763	1.2%	3,455	2.1%	165,047
Merrimack	33,571	52.8%	24,479	38.5%	4,766	7.5%	677	1.2%	9,092	14.3%	63,602
Rockingham	61,247	46.3%	60,837	46.0%	8,743	6.6%	1,395	1.1%	410	0.3%	132,351
Strafford	28,044	56.9%	17,234	35.0%	3,326	6.8%	620	1.3%	10,810	21.9%	49,262
Sullivan	8,127	44.1%	8,610	46.7%	1,415	7.7%	252	1.5%	-483	-2.6%	18,438
Totals	275,038	48.7%	246,952	43.8%	35,904	6.4%	6,446	1.1%	28,086	4.9%%	564,953

Counties that flipped from Democratic to Republican

- Belknap (largest city: Laconia)
- Carroll (largest town: Conway)
- Sullivan (largest city: Claremont)
