= Norman D'Amours =

American politician (born 1937)

Norm D'Amours
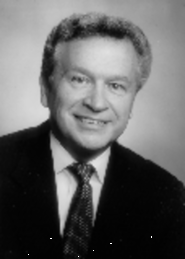

Chair of the National Credit Union Administration
- In office November 24, 1993 – January 20, 2001
- President: Bill Clinton
- Preceded by: Roger Jepsen
- Succeeded by: Dennis Dollar (acting)

Member of the U.S. House of Representatives from New Hampshire's 1st district
- In office January 3, 1975 – January 3, 1985
- Preceded by: Louis C. Wyman
- Succeeded by: Bob Smith

Personal details
- Born: Norman Edward D'Amours; October 14, 1937 (age 88) Holyoke, Massachusetts, U.S
- Party: Democratic
- Spouse: Helen Manning
- Children: 3
- Education: Assumption University (BA); Boston University (LLB)

Military service
- Allegiance: United States
- Branch/service: United States Army
- Years of service: 1964–1967
- Unit: United States Army Reserve

Norman Edward D'Amours (born October 14, 1937) is an American lawyer and Democratic politician who was a five-term member of the United States House of Representatives from New Hampshire from 1975 to 1985.

== Early life ==
Born in Holyoke, Hampden County, Massachusetts, D'Amours attended parochial school in Holyoke and High School in Worcester, Massachusetts. He graduated from Assumption College with a B.A. in 1960 and from Boston University School of Law with an L.L.B. in 1963. He was admitted to the bar in Massachusetts in 1963 and in New Hampshire in 1964. He was also admitted to the bar in the District of Columbia. He was a practicing attorney in New Hampshire and served in the United States Army Reserves.

== Career ==
D'Amours served as assistant attorney general for the state of New Hampshire from 1966 to 1969 and as city prosecutor of Manchester, New Hampshire from 1970 to 1972.

=== Congress ===
D'Amours served during the 94th, 95th, 96th, 97th, and 98th Congresses as United States Representative for the 1st District of New Hampshire from January 3, 1975 to January 3, 1985. During his tenure, he was an active participant on issues related to banking and finance. He ran for the United States Senate in 1984 against Republican incumbent Gordon J. Humphrey but lost with 41% of the vote to Humphrey's 59%. He was succeeded as Representative for the 1st district by Republican Bob Smith.

=== Clinton administration ===
President Bill Clinton appointed D'Amours as the chairman of the National Credit Union Administration (NCUA), and he was subsequently unanimously confirmed by the U.S. Senate. He served seven years, from 1993 to 2000, as chairman of NCUA. This federal government agency has oversight over 11,000 institutions, managing $400 billion in assets.

=== Later career ===
D'Amours remains active in national politics. He is a partner in Dierman, Wortley, Zola & Associates in Washington, DC.

== Family life ==
The son of Albert and Edna Delvina (LaPlante) D'Amours, he married Helen Elizabeth Manning, and they had three children, Susan, Danielle, and Norman. He resides in Arlington, Virginia.

U.S. House of Representatives
Preceded by Louis C. Wyman	Member of the U.S. House of Representatives from New Hampshire's 1st congressional district 1975–1985	Succeeded by Bob Smith
Party political offices
Preceded by Thomas J. McIntyre	Democratic nominee for U.S. Senator from New Hampshire (Class 2); 1984	Succeeded by John A. Durkin
U.S. order of precedence (ceremonial)
Preceded by Tom Rice as Former U.S. Representative	Order of precedence of the United States as Former U.S. Representative	Succeeded by Stan Lundine as Former U.S. Representative
