= 1972 United States Senate election in New Hampshire =

- November 7, 1972
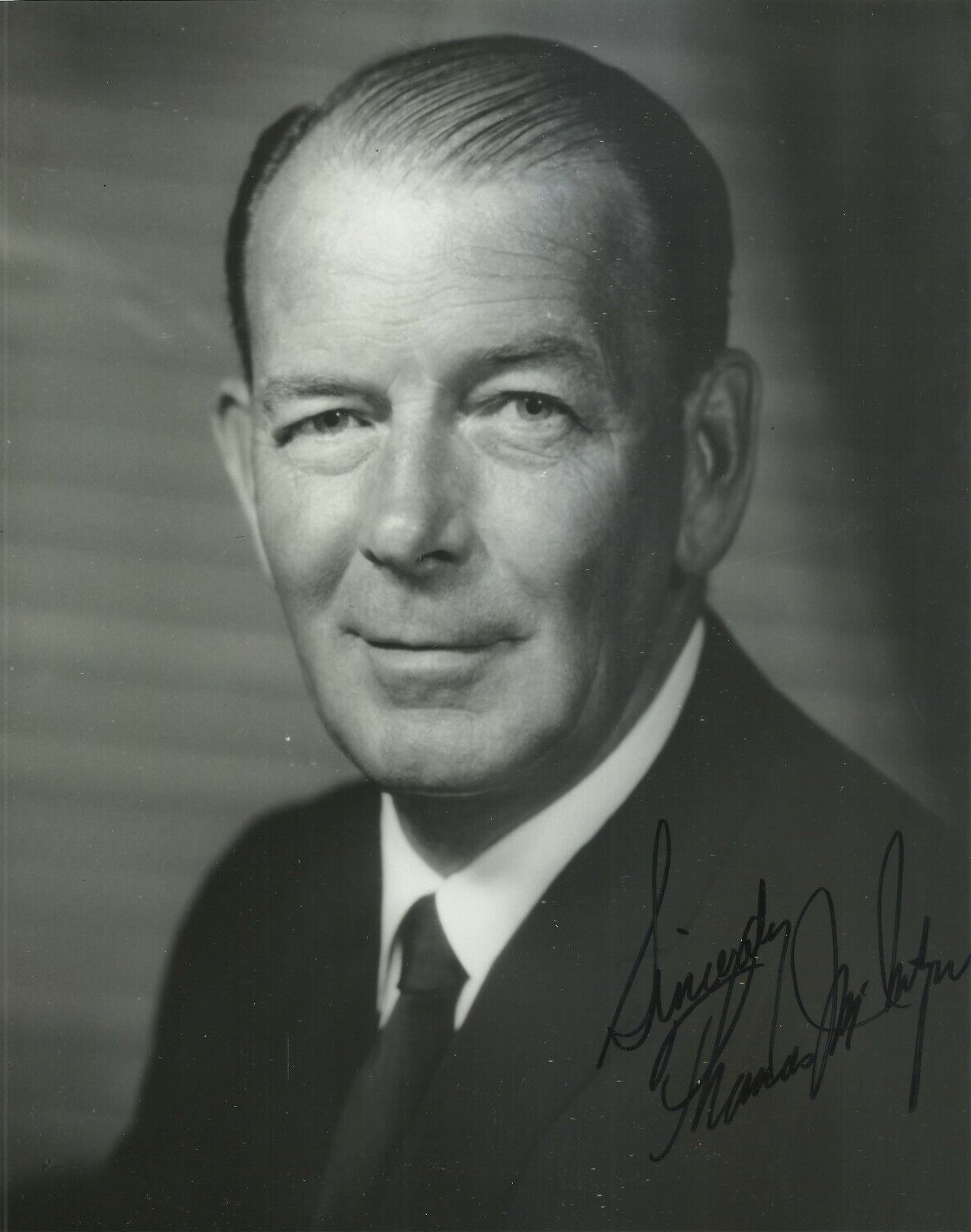

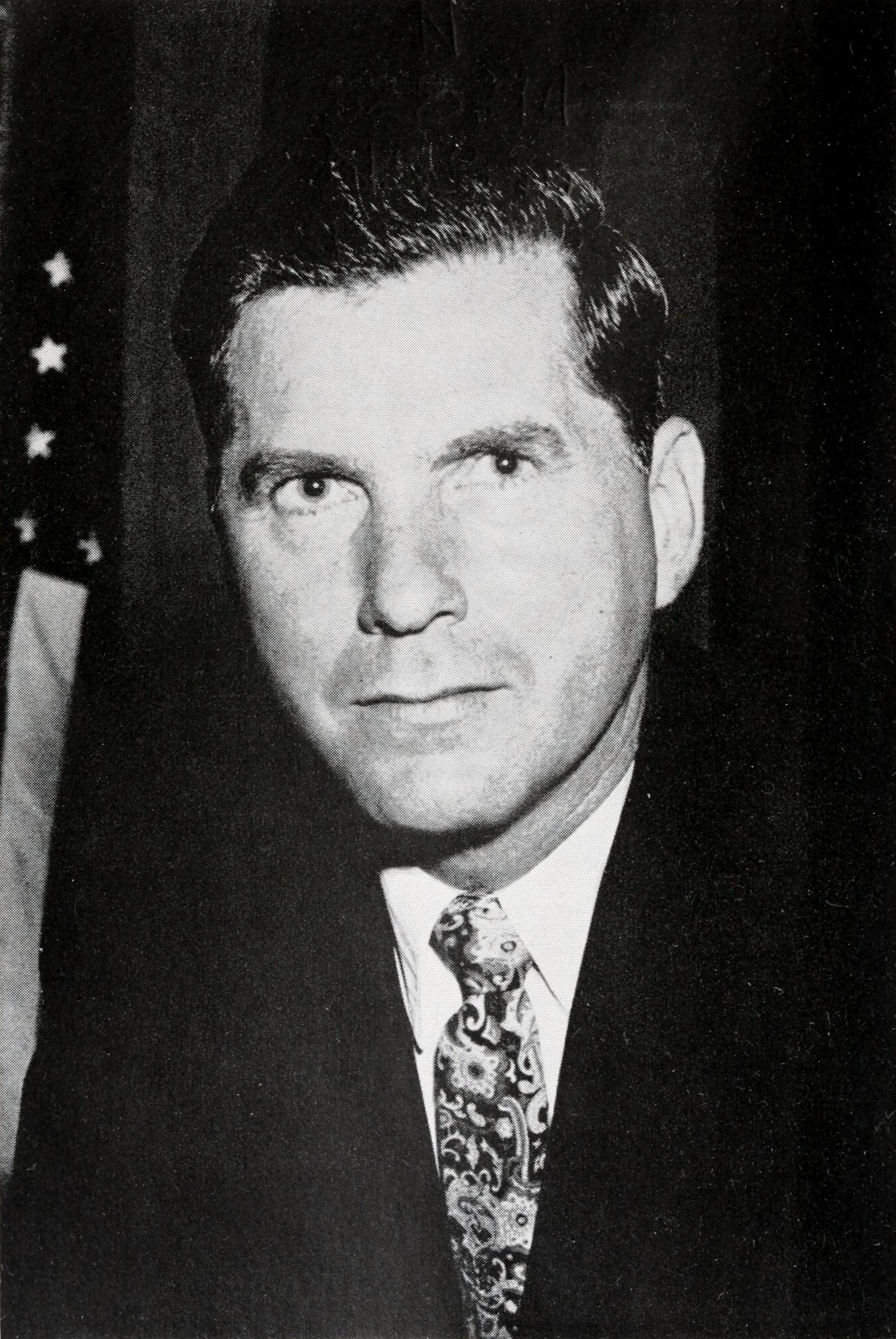
Nominee	Thomas J. McIntyre	Wesley Powell
Party	Democratic	Republican
Popular vote	184,495	139,852
Percentage	56.88%	43.12%
- McIntyre: 40–50% 50–60% 60–70% 70–80% >90% Powell: 50–60% 60–70% 70–80% 80–90% >90% No data/vote
U.S. senator before election
Thomas J. McIntyre
Democratic
Elected U.S. Senator
Thomas J. McIntyre
Democratic

The 1972 United States Senate election in New Hampshire took place on November 7, 1972. Incumbent Democratic Senator Thomas J. McIntyre won re-election to a third term. Democrats would not win this seat again until 2008. This was the first time Democrats were re-elected to any Senate seat in New Hampshire.

New Hampshire was one of fifteen states, alongside Alabama, Arkansas, Colorado, Delaware, Georgia, Iowa, Louisiana, Maine, Minnesota, Mississippi, Montana, Rhode Island, South Dakota and West Virginia, that were won by Republican President Richard Nixon in 1972 that elected Democrats to the United States Senate.

== Primary elections ==
Primary elections were held on September 12, 1972.

=== Democratic primary ===
==== Candidates ====
- Thomas J. McIntyre, incumbent United States senator

==== Results ====
Democratic primary results
Party	Candidate	Votes	%
Democratic	Thomas J. McIntyre (incumbent)	42,461	98.37
Democratic	Write-ins	702	1.63
Total votes		43,163	100.00

=== Republican primary ===
==== Candidates ====
- Peter J. Booras, businessman
- David A. Brock, former United States attorney
- Marshall W. Cobleigh, speaker of the New Hampshire House of Representatives
- Wesley Powell, former Governor

==== Results ====
Republican primary results
Party	Candidate	Votes	%
Republican	Wesley Powell	42,837	47.97
Republican	Peter J. Booras	19,714	22.08
Republican	David A. Brock	16,326	18.28
Republican	Marshall W. Cobleigh	10,106	11.32
Republican	Write-ins	319	0.36
Total votes		89,302	100.00

== General election ==
=== Results ===
1972 United States Senate election in New Hampshire
Party	Candidate	Votes	%
Democratic	Thomas J. McIntyre (incumbent)	184,495	56.88
Republican	Wesley Powell	139,852	43.12
None	Scattering	7	0.00
Majority		44,643	13.76
Turnout		324,354	
Democratic hold			

== See also ==
- 1972 United States Senate elections

== Bibliography ==
- Congressional Elections, 1946-1996. Washington, D.C.: Congressional Quarterly Inc. 1998. ISBN 1-56802-248-4.
- Stark, Robert L., ed. (1973). Manual for the General Court of New Hampshire. Vol. 43. Concord, NH: Department of State, New Hampshire.
- Scammon, Richard M., ed. (1973). America Votes 10: a handbook of contemporary American election statistics, 1972. Washington, D.C.: Governmental Affairs Institute.
