= 1954 New Hampshire gubernatorial election =

- November 2, 1954
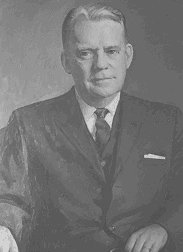

Nominee	Lane Dwinell	John Shaw
Party	Republican	Democratic
Popular vote	107,287	87,344
Percentage	55.12%	44.88%
- Dwinell: 50–60% 60–70% 70–80% 80–90% >90% Shaw: 50–60% 60–70% 70–80% 80–90%
Governor before election
Hugh Gregg
Republican
Elected Governor
Lane Dwinell
Republican

The 1954 New Hampshire gubernatorial election was held on November 2, 1954. Republican nominee Lane Dwinell defeated Democratic nominee John Shaw with 55.12% of the vote.

== Primary elections ==
Primary elections were held on September 14, 1954.

=== Candidates ===
- John Shaw, Mayor of Rochester
- Charles R. Eastman, former head of the New Hampshire Grange

=== Results ===
Democratic primary results
Party	Candidate	Votes	%
Democratic	John Shaw	13,563	55.19
Democratic	Charles R. Eastman	11,014	44.81
Total votes		24,577	100.00

=== Republican primary ===
==== Candidates ====
- Lane Dwinell, President of the New Hampshire Senate
- Elmer E. Bussey, farmer

==== Results ====
Republican primary results
Party	Candidate	Votes	%
Republican	Lane Dwinell	57,445	89.58
Republican	Elmer E. Bussey	6,682	10.42
Total votes		64,127	100.00

== General election ==
=== Candidates ===
- Lane Dwinell, Republican
- John Shaw, Democratic

=== Results ===
1954 New Hampshire gubernatorial election
Party	Candidate	Votes	%	±%
Republican	Lane Dwinell	107,287	55.12%	
Democratic	John Shaw	87,344	44.88%	
Majority		19,943		
Turnout		194,631		
Republican hold		Swing		
