= Gordon J. Humphrey =

American politician (born 1940)

Gordon Humphrey
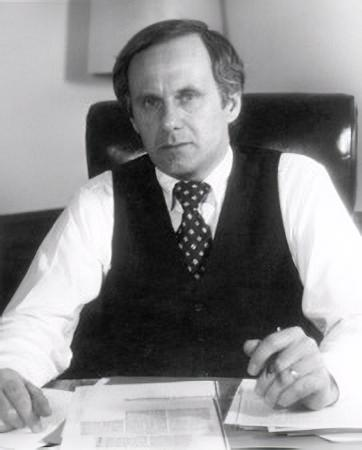

Member of the New Hampshire Senate from the 17th district
- In office December 5, 1990 – December 2, 1992
- Preceded by: William Johnson
- Succeeded by: John Barnes Jr.

United States Senator from New Hampshire
- In office January 3, 1979 – December 4, 1990
- Preceded by: Thomas McIntyre
- Succeeded by: Bob Smith

Personal details
- Born: Gordon John Humphrey; October 9, 1940 (age 85) Bristol, Connecticut, U.S.
- Party: Republican (before 2016); Independent (2016–present)
- Spouse: Patricia Green
- Education: George Washington University (attended); University of Maryland, College Park (attended)

Gordon John Humphrey (born October 9, 1940) is an American politician from New Hampshire. A member of the Republican Party, he served two terms in the United States Senate from 1979 to 1990, and twice ran unsuccessfully for governor of New Hampshire.

== Early life and education ==
Humphrey was born in Bristol, Connecticut. His first career path was in aviation: he served in the United States Air Force for several years and, following college (George Washington University and the University of Maryland, College Park), he became a professional pilot.

Originally a liberal, Humphrey said he converted to conservatism because of "the force of my own logic".

In 1977, Humphrey became the leader of the New Hampshire chapter of Conservative Caucus, which had been looking for someone to head it up for months. Humphrey volunteered and began organizing signature-gathering for petitions and putting together well-attended rallies.

== U.S. Senate ==
=== Elections ===
In 1978, Humphrey won election to the U.S. Senate, despite being only a local Republican activist holding no political office. He defeated three-term incumbent Thomas J. McIntyre by barely two percent. He won election without help from the Republican Party and had few links to party regulars. Humphrey's 18-month campaign was run for the most part by himself and Patricia Green, a former New York City schoolteacher whom he married just after the four-way GOP primary that September. According to a New York Times article written a month after the election, she was "considered the strongest force in his camp and is expected to have a strong influence on his Washington staff".

Humphrey was easily reelected in 1984, defeating five-term Democratic congressman Norman D'Amours. Humphrey declined to run for a third term in 1990, having promised to serve only two terms, and was succeeded by fellow Republican Bob Smith.

Humphrey was known for his outspokenness as a senator.

In 1987, Humphrey harshly criticized President Ronald Reagan's appointment of openly gay geneticist Dr. Frank Lilly to his commission on the HIV Epidemic, saying that Lilly's appointment would send the message ". . .that homosexuality is simply an alternative lifestyle".

=== Committee assignments ===
In the Senate Humphrey served on the Committee on Foreign Relations, the Armed Services Committee and the Judiciary Committee and was a leader in the Congressional Task Force on Afghanistan, which shaped U.S. policy regarding the Soviet–Afghan War and Operation Cyclone. He voted against the federal budget all 12 years he was a member of the Senate, each time because the proposed budget ran a deficit.

=== Role at 1988 GOP Convention ===
Humphrey played a major role at the 1988 Republican National Convention as a leader and spokesman for right-wing delegates. He was instrumental in steering the vice-presidential nomination to Dan Quayle, having marshaled the commitment of four state delegations to run their own vice-presidential candidate in the event a candidate not to their liking was picked by George H. W. Bush. Under party rules, six delegations were needed. Bush's choice of Quayle, who was pro-life (as was Humphrey), satisfied the New Hampshire senator.

== Later political career ==
On March 5, 1989, Humphrey announced he would not run for a third term, stating that two terms was enough. Instead, he ran for and won a seat in the New Hampshire State Senate in 1990, serving one term. There were reports of his making a possible run for president on the Republican ticket in both 1988 and 1992, but neither happened.

Humphrey returned to New Hampshire politics in 2000 by challenging incumbent Governor Jeanne Shaheen. Shaheen, a Democrat, was considered vulnerable in the wake of a New Hampshire Supreme Court decision requiring the state to play a larger role in funding education, which many saw as a path toward instituting a statewide income or sales tax. Humphrey pledged to block attempts to enact such taxes, but was narrowly defeated in a contentious campaign.

Humphrey ran for the Republican nomination for governor again in 2002, but businessman Craig Benson eventually won the nomination and the governor's race. Humphrey finished third in the primary, and said the campaign would be his last.

== Post-political career ==
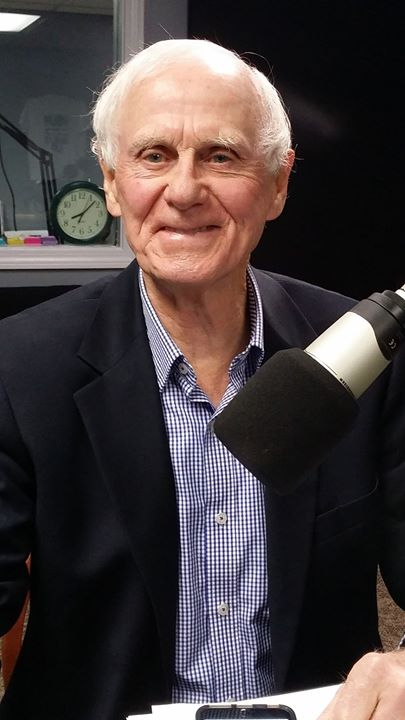
Humphrey in 2015

In 2004, Humphrey entered the field of radio broadcasting, purchasing an AM station in Concord, WKXL. He lives in Chichester, New Hampshire, with his wife, Patricia, and their two children.

=== Support for Edward Snowden ===
In 2013, Humphrey made headlines when he expressed support for whistleblower Edward Snowden, who exposed the mass surveillance of Americans and foreign nationals by the National Security Agency. Journalist Glenn Greenwald reported that Humphrey, a former member of the Senate Foreign Relations Committee, contacted Snowden via email, telling him that, "Provided you have not leaked information that would put in harms [sic] way any intelligence agent, I believe you have done the right thing in exposing what I regard as massive violation of the United States Constitution."

Humphrey complained to Snowden that "no effort is being made to identify, remove from office and bring to justice those officials who have abused power, seriously and repeatedly violating the Constitution of the United States and the rights of millions of unsuspecting citizens." He cited Snowden as a "courageous whistle-blower". Snowden replied with a message thanking Humphrey.

=== 2016 presidential election ===
In 2015, Humphrey endorsed Ohio governor John Kasich for President in 2016. During the 2016 Republican presidential primaries, Humphrey was a leader of efforts to try to block Donald Trump from securing the nomination at the Republican National Convention. He stated, "I would only vote for Hillary in the event of a very close contest. Meantime, I'm hoping the Republican leadership, at long, long last will show the courage and principle to denounce Trump and to demand he renounce the nomination or face a reconvening of the convention." On November 6, 2016, two days before the election, Humphrey officially endorsed Clinton. That same month, Humphrey left the Republican Party and became an independent.

=== Calling for Donald Trump's removal from office ===
On August 9, 2017, Humphrey extended his opposition to President Trump by calling for his removal from office in a letter addressed to his own member of Congress, Democrat Annie Kuster, arguing that Trump is "sick of mind" and dangerous.

Party political offices
Preceded by Wesley Powell	Republican nominee for U.S. Senator from New Hampshire (Class 2); 1978, 1984	Succeeded by Bob Smith
Preceded by Jay Lucas	Republican nominee for Governor of New Hampshire; 2000	Succeeded by Craig Benson
U.S. Senate
Preceded by Thomas McIntyre	United States Senator (Class 2) from New Hampshire; 1979–1990; Served alongside: John Durkin, Warren Rudman	Succeeded by Bob Smith
U.S. order of precedence (ceremonial)
Preceded by Saxby Chambliss as Former U.S. Senator	Order of precedence of the United States as Former U.S. Senator	Succeeded by Bob Smith as Former U.S. Senator
