= Richard F. Upton =

American politician

Member of the New Hampshire House of Representatives
- In office 1941
- In office 1947–1951

Speaker of the New Hampshire House of Representatives
- In office 1949–1951
- Preceded by: J. Walker Wiggin
- Succeeded by: Lane Dwinell

Personal details
- Born: September 3, 1914 Bow, New Hampshire, U.S.
- Died: August 12, 1996 (aged 81)
- Party: Republican
- Parent: Robert W. Upton (father)
- Education: Dartmouth College; Harvard University

Richard F. Upton (September 3, 1914 – August 12, 1996) was an American politician. He served as a Republican member of the New Hampshire House of Representatives.

== Life and career ==
Upton was born in Bow, New Hampshire. He attended Dartmouth College and Harvard University.

Upton served in the New Hampshire House of Representatives in 1941 and again from 1947 to 1951.

Upton died on August 12, 1996, at the age of 81.
