= Doloris Bridges =

American politician (1916–1969)

Doloris Bridges (May 28, 1916 – January 16, 1969), widow of 25-year U.S. Senator H. Styles Bridges, was the first woman to seek election to the U.S. Senate from New Hampshire. Considered an example of staunchly anti-communist women who emerged as leaders during the Goldwater era of the Republican Party in the mid-1960s, she died of cancer before the decade was over, without ever winning office.

== Personal background ==
Doloris May Thauwald was born in Gibbon, Minnesota, the daughter of Dr. Charles Casper Thauwald and Clara (Frediani) Thauwald. She was educated in St. Paul, Minnesota, public schools and graduated from the University of Minnesota in 1935. She attended Strayer Business College at Washington D.C., and the Foreign Service School of the U.S. Department of State. She entered government service in October 1937 in the U.S. Department of Internal Revenue, and later became an administrative assistant in the State Department's world trade intelligence division.

== Wife ==
In February 1944, at age 29, she married U.S. Senator H. Styles Bridges of New Hampshire, a widower then in his second term. Bridges continued to serve in the U.S. Senate for 17 more years. In 1955, during Senator Bridges' fourth term, the New Hampshire Sunday News, a newspaper owned by conservative editor William Loeb III, suggested that Mrs. Bridges should be elected to New Hampshire's other U.S. Senate seat. Late in the 1960 presidential campaign, she accused Senator John F. Kennedy of softness toward communism and of absenting himself from the Senate when anticommunist legislation reached the Senate floor.

== Widow ==
Sen. Bridges died the next year, on November 26, 1961. Even before Senator Bridges was laid to rest, Loeb editorialized that Mrs. Bridges should be appointed to fill his vacancy.

Although many assumed that Governor Wesley Powell would either appoint himself, or Mrs. Bridges, to the Senate seat, instead Powell appointed 34-year-old Maurice J. Murphy, Jr., whom Powell had chosen as the state's attorney general just one month earlier. Loeb broke with Powell because he appointed Murphy over Mrs. Bridges. Powell lost his bid for renomination in the next Republican primary, a loss that Powell would attribute to Loeb and to the Murphy appointment.

== 1962 Republican U.S. Senate primary ==
In response to the Murphy appointment, Mrs. Bridges issued a statement that wished for Murphy “a special blessing from our Lord, because he will have great need of it in the weeks and months ahead.” But she immediately decided to run for Murphy's seat, which was the subject of a special election in November 1962. When kicking off her campaign, she stated that she wished to win and hold the seat for “the rest of my life.” Her opponents in the primary included Murphy, Congressman Perkins Bass, and Congressman Chester Merrow, all of whom except Bridges incurred the wrath of Loeb's editorials. During the campaign, she advocated an invasion of Cuba to overthrow the Castro regime. She finished a close second in the primary, less than 2,000 votes behind Bass, but ahead of Murphy and Merrow. Bass lost in the general election to Democrat Thomas J. McIntyre.

== 1964 New Hampshire presidential primary ==
In the 1964 Republican presidential primary in New Hampshire, she was an early and prominent supporter of Barry Goldwater, who, in 1962, had criticized Powell's failure to appoint her to the Senate. Had Goldwater earned the most votes, she and the others on the Goldwater slate would have represented New Hampshire at the 1964 Republican National Convention. Instead, more New Hampshire Republican primary voters wrote in the name of a non-candidate who had not even entered the state—former Massachusetts Senator Henry Cabot Lodge Jr., who was then the U.S. Ambassador to Vietnam.

== 1966 Republican U.S. Senate primary ==
The Senate seat once held by Mr. Bridges and won by Democrat McIntyre in the 1962 special election was up again for election in 1966. From the outset Loeb backed retired Air Force General Harrison Thyng, who was a strong supporter of continuing U.S. offensives in the Vietnam War. On the eve of the filing deadline, Bridges became a surprise candidate for the nomination. Distancing herself from Loeb's editorials and Thyng's position on the war, Bridges urged a peaceful solution to the conflict, to be found by a blue-ribbon committee of Americans. Yet in the same interview she would add, "I don't want my position to be misunderstood. I am for winning this war in Vietnam and getting out." She finished in fifth place in the primary, well behind Thyng, who then lost in the general election to McIntyre.

== Her final years ==
Mrs. Bridges maintained a low profile in the politics surrounding the 1968 New Hampshire presidential primary, won by Richard M. Nixon. Suffering from cancer, she was hospitalized in late 1968, and died on January 16, 1969, in Concord.

In their wills, Mr. and Mrs. Bridges left their East Concord home (known as Bridges House) to the state for use as the New Hampshire Governor's Mansion.
