= Robert W. Upton =

American politician (1884–1972)

Robert William Upton
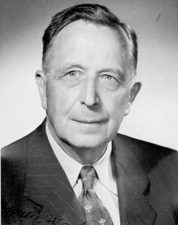

United States Senator from New Hampshire
- In office August 14, 1953 – November 7, 1954
- Appointed by: Hugh Gregg
- Preceded by: Charles W. Tobey
- Succeeded by: Norris Cotton

Member of the New Hampshire House of Representatives
- In office 1911

Personal details
- Born: February 3, 1884 Boston, Massachusetts, U.S.
- Died: April 28, 1972 (aged 88) Concord, New Hampshire, U.S.
- Party: Republican
- Children: Richard F. Upton
- Education: Boston University Law School

Robert William Upton (February 3, 1884 – April 28, 1972) was a United States senator from New Hampshire. Born in Boston, Massachusetts, he attended the public schools, graduated from Boston University Law School in 1907, was admitted to the Massachusetts and New Hampshire bars in 1907 and commenced practice in Concord, New Hampshire. He was a member of the New Hampshire House of Representatives in 1911 and was a delegate to the New Hampshire State Constitutional Conventions of 1918, 1930, 1938, and 1948, serving as president in 1948. In 1940, he also served as president of the New Hampshire Bar Association.

Upton was appointed on August 14, 1953, as a Republican to the U.S. Senate to fill the vacancy caused by the death of Charles W. Tobey, and served from August 14, 1953, to November 7, 1954; he was an unsuccessful candidate for nomination to fill the vacancy. He resumed the practice of law, was a member of the Mixed Board, Clemency and Parole in Bonn, Germany in 1956, and was special ambassador to Liberia that year. He retired from law practice in 1970 and in 1972 died in Concord; interment was in Blossom Hill Cemetery.

U.S. Senate
Preceded by Charles W. Tobey	U.S. senator (Class 3) from New Hampshire; 1953 – 1954; Served alongside: Styles Bridges	Succeeded by Norris Cotton
