= Alf E. Jacobson =

American politician

Member of the New Hampshire House of Representatives
- In office 1994–2001
- In office 1982–1992

Member of the New Hampshire Senate
- In office 1969–1981

Personal details
- Born: April 4, 1924
- Died: April 18, 2010 (aged 86)
- Party: Republican
- Education: North Park College; Northwestern University; Tufts University; Harvard University

Alf E. Jacobson (April 4, 1924 – April 18, 2010) was a Republican Party politician who served in the New Hampshire House of Representatives from 1982 to 1992 and again from 1994 to 2001. He also served in the New Hampshire Senate from 1969 to 1981, where he served as President. He was a professor at Colby–Sawyer College.
