= Lane Dwinell =

American manufacturer and politician

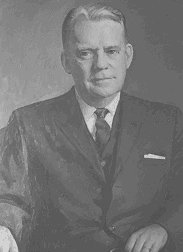

Assistant Secretary of State for Administration
- In office July 13, 1959 – February 3, 1961
- President: Dwight D. Eisenhower; John F. Kennedy
- Preceded by: Walter K. Scott
- Succeeded by: William J. Crockett

69th Governor of New Hampshire
- In office January 6, 1955 – January 1, 1959
- Preceded by: Hugh Gregg
- Succeeded by: Wesley Powell

Personal details
- Born: November 14, 1906 Newport, Vermont
- Died: March 27, 1997 (aged 90) Hanover, New Hampshire
- Party: Republican
- Spouse: Elizabeth Cushman Dwinell

Seymour Lane Dwinell (November 14, 1906 – March 27, 1997) was an American manufacturer and Republican politician from Lebanon, New Hampshire. Born in 1906 in Newport, Vermont, he served in and led both houses of the New Hampshire legislature before his tenure as the 69th governor of New Hampshire from 1955 to 1959. He died in 1997 aged 90 in Hanover, New Hampshire and is buried in Lebanon, New Hampshire.

Party political offices
Preceded by Hugh Gregg	Republican nominee for Governor of New Hampshire; 1954, 1956	Succeeded by Wesley Powell
Political offices
Preceded by Hugh Gregg	Governor of New Hampshire; 1955–1959	Succeeded by Wesley Powell
Preceded by Blaylock Atherton	President of the New Hampshire Senate; 1953–1955	Succeeded by Raymond K. Perkins
Preceded by Richard F. Upton	Speaker of the New Hampshire House of Representatives; 1951–1952	Succeeded by
Government offices
Preceded by Walter K. Scott	Assistant Secretary of State for Administration; July 23, 1959 – February 3, 1961	Succeeded by William J. Crockett
