= Chester E. Merrow =

American politician (1906–1974)

Chester Earl Merrow
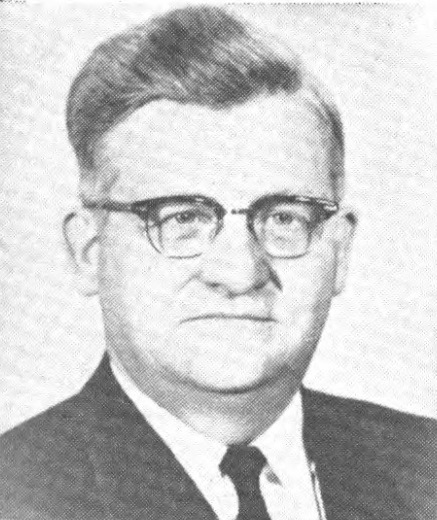

Member of the U.S. House of Representatives from New Hampshire's 1st district
- In office January 3, 1943 – January 3, 1963
- Preceded by: Arthur B. Jenks
- Succeeded by: Louis C. Wyman

Member of the New Hampshire House of Representatives
- In office 1939-1940

Personal details
- Born: November 15, 1906 Center Ossipee, New Hampshire
- Died: February 10, 1974 (aged 67) Center Ossipee, New Hampshire
- Resting place: Chickville Cemetery
- Party: Republican

Chester Earl Merrow (November 15, 1906 – February 10, 1974) was a U.S. representative from New Hampshire.

Born in Center Ossipee, New Hampshire, Merrow attended the public schools and Brewster Free Academy in Wolfeboro from 1921 to 1925. He was graduated from Colby College, Waterville, Maine, in 1929 and from Teachers College (summers) (Columbia University), New York City, in 1937.

Merrow was an instructor of science at Kents Hill School in Maine in 1929 and 1930 and at Montpelier Seminary from 1930 to 1937. He served as assistant headmaster of Montpelier Seminary from 1935 to 1938. He was an instructor of political science and history at Vermont Junior College in Montpelier in 1937 and 1938.

Merrow was a member of the New Hampshire House of Representatives in 1939 and 1940. He became a radio news commentator and lecturer, and served as delegate to an international conference on education and cultural relations of the United Nations, held in London in 1945. He was a congressional adviser to the first conference of the United Nations Educational, Scientific, and Cultural Organization (UNESCO) held in Paris in 1946. He served as a member of the United States delegation to UNESCO 1946-1949.

Merrow was elected as a Republican to the Seventy-eighth and to the nine succeeding Congresses (January 3, 1943 – January 3, 1963). Merrow voted in favor of the Civil Rights Acts of 1957 and 1960, but voted present the 24th Amendment to the U.S. Constitution. He was not a candidate for reelection in 1962 to the Eighty-eighth Congress, but was unsuccessful for nomination to the United States Senate. Subsequently, he was Special Adviser on Community Relations, Department of State, from 1963 to 1968. He was an unsuccessful candidate for election in 1970 to the Ninety-second Congress and in 1972 to the Ninety-third Congress. He resided in Center Ossipee until his death there, February 10, 1974. He was interred in Chickville Cemetery.

U.S. House of Representatives
Preceded by Arthur B. Jenks	Member of the U.S. House of Representatives from New Hampshire's 1st congressional district January 3, 1943 – January 3, 1963	Succeeded by Louis C. Wyman
