= Wesley Powell =

American lawyer and politician

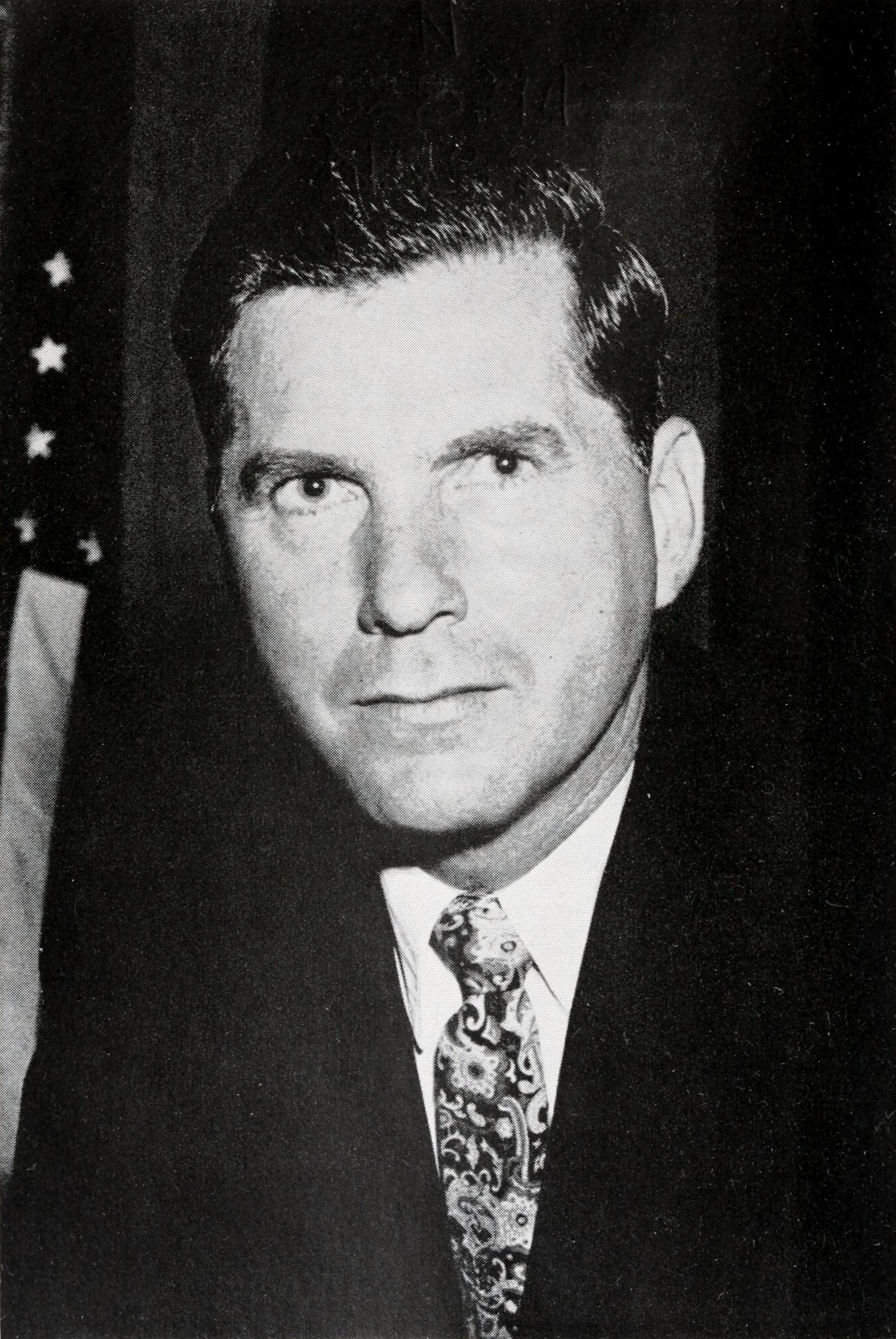

70th Governor of New Hampshire
- In office January 1, 1959 – January 3, 1963
- Preceded by: Lane Dwinell
- Succeeded by: John W. King

Chair of the National Governors Association
- In office June 25, 1961 – July 1, 1962
- Preceded by: Stephen McNichols
- Succeeded by: Albert Rosellini

Personal details
- Born: October 13, 1915 Portsmouth, New Hampshire, U.S.
- Died: January 6, 1981 (aged 65) Hampton Falls, New Hampshire, U.S.
- Party: Republican
- Education: University of New Hampshire, Durham (BA); Southern Methodist College of Law (LLB)

Wesley Powell (October 13, 1915 – January 6, 1981) was an American lawyer and Republican politician who served as the 70th governor of New Hampshire from 1959 to 1963.

Powell was born in Portsmouth, New Hampshire. He attended schools in Portsmouth before graduating from the University of New Hampshire. He received his law degree from the Southern Methodist College of Law in 1940.

He served in the U.S. Army Air Corps in World War II and practiced law in Manchester before his tenure as the 70th governor of New Hampshire from 1959 to 1963. During Powell’s tenure, he helped to consolidate state agencies, and to promote tourism. As governor Powell opposed tax increases.

Powell ran for renomination in 1962, he was defeated in the Primary by John Pillsbury who lost the general election to John W. King. Powell made unsuccessful bids for the governorship in 1964, and 1978, and The U. S. Senate in 1966 and 1972. Powell died of natural causes on January 6, 1981, at the age of 65.

== Memorials ==
A street in Hampton Falls is named Governor Powell Drive.

Party political offices
| Preceded by Lane Dwinell | Republican nominee for Governor of New Hampshire; 1958, 1960 | Succeeded by John Pillsbury |
| Preceded by Harrison Thyng | Republican nominee for U.S. Senator from New Hampshire (Class 2); 1972 | Succeeded by Gordon J. Humphrey |
Political offices
| Preceded by Lane Dwinell | Governor of New Hampshire; 1959–1963 | Succeeded by John W. King |
| Preceded by Stephen McNichols | Chair of the National Governors Association; 1961–1962 | Succeeded by Albert Rosellini |
