= List of United States senators from New Hampshire =

Current delegation

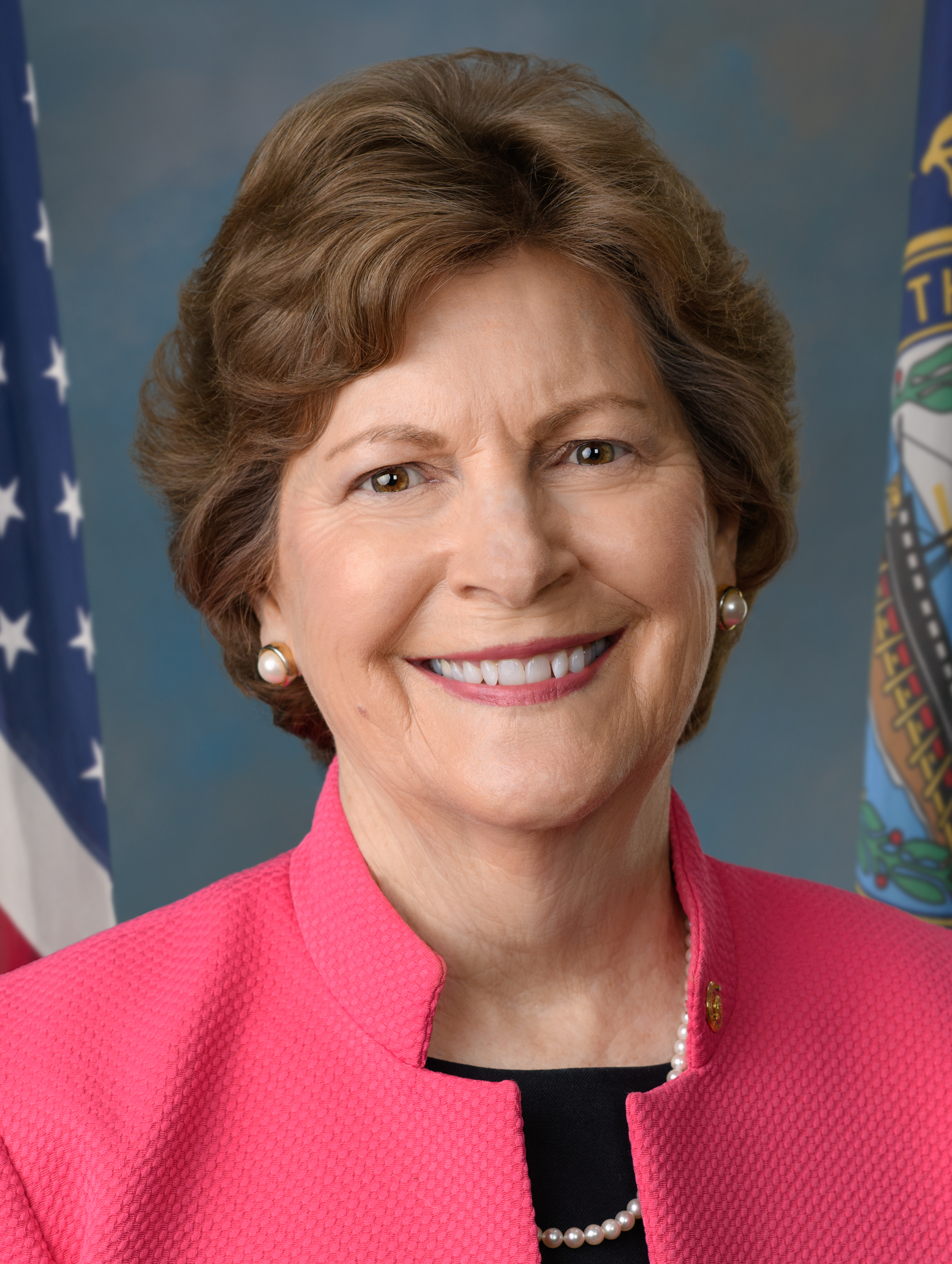
Jeanne Shaheen (D)

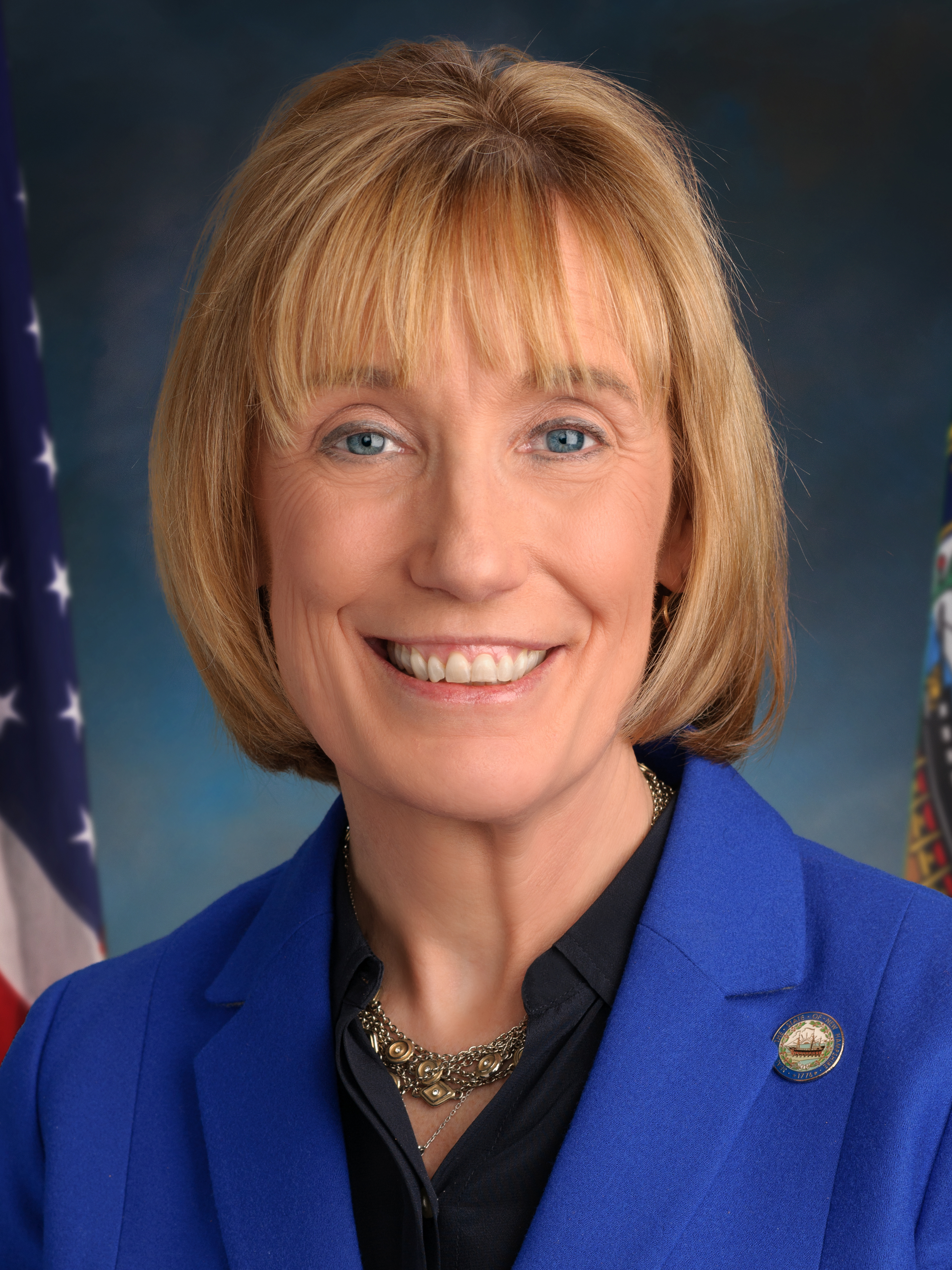
Maggie Hassan (D)

(ordered by seniority)

New Hampshire was admitted to the Union on June 21, 1788. It elects United States senators to class 2 and class 3. The state's current senators are Democrats Jeanne Shaheen and Maggie Hassan making it one of only four states alongside Minnesota, Nevada and Washington to have two female U.S. senators. Senator Shaheen is currently serving her third term (since 2009); Senator Hassan is currently serving her second term (since 2017). Jacob Harold Gallinger was New Hampshire's longest-serving senator (1891–1918).

== List of senators ==
Class 2 Class 2 senators belong to the electoral cycle that most recently had regular elections in 2008, 2014, 2020, and 2026. The next election will be in 2032.						C	Class 3 Class 3 senators belong to the electoral cycle that most recently had regular elections in 2004, 2010, 2016, and 2022. The next election will be in 2028.					
#	Senator	Party	Dates in office	Electoral history	T	C	T	Electoral history	Dates in office	Party	Senator	#
1	Paine Wingate (Stratham)	Anti- Admin.	Mar 4, 1789 – Mar 3, 1793	Josiah Bartlett was at first elected in 1788, but "declined the appointment." Elected in 1789. Lost re-election.	1	1st	1	Elected in 1788.	Mar 4, 1789 – Mar 3, 1801	Pro- Admin.	John Langdon (Portsmouth)	1
1	Paine Wingate (Stratham)	Anti- Admin.	Mar 4, 1789 – Mar 3, 1793	Josiah Bartlett was at first elected in 1788, but "declined the appointment." Elected in 1789. Lost re-election.	1	2nd	1	Elected in 1788.	Mar 4, 1789 – Mar 3, 1801	Pro- Admin.	John Langdon (Portsmouth)	1
2	Samuel Livermore (Holderness)	Pro- Admin.	Mar 4, 1793 – Jun 12, 1801	Elected in 1792.	2	3rd	1	Elected in 1788.	Mar 4, 1789 – Mar 3, 1801	Anti- Admin.	John Langdon (Portsmouth)	1
2	Samuel Livermore (Holderness)	Federalist	Mar 4, 1793 – Jun 12, 1801	Elected in 1792.	2	4th	2	Re-election year unknown.	Mar 4, 1789 – Mar 3, 1801	Democratic- Republican	John Langdon (Portsmouth)	1
2	Samuel Livermore (Holderness)	Federalist	Mar 4, 1793 – Jun 12, 1801	Elected in 1792.	2	5th	2	Re-election year unknown.	Mar 4, 1789 – Mar 3, 1801	Democratic- Republican	John Langdon (Portsmouth)	1
2	Samuel Livermore (Holderness)	Federalist	Mar 4, 1793 – Jun 12, 1801	Re-elected in 1798. Resigned.	3	6th	2	Re-election year unknown.	Mar 4, 1789 – Mar 3, 1801	Democratic- Republican	John Langdon (Portsmouth)	1
2	Samuel Livermore (Holderness)	Federalist	Mar 4, 1793 – Jun 12, 1801	Re-elected in 1798. Resigned.	3	7th	3	Elected in 1800. Resigned.	Mar 4, 1801 – Jun 14, 1802	Federalist	James Sheafe (Portsmouth)	2
Vacant			Jun 12, 1801 – Jun 17, 1801		3	7th	3	Elected in 1800. Resigned.	Mar 4, 1801 – Jun 14, 1802	Federalist	James Sheafe (Portsmouth)	2
3	Simeon Olcott (Charlestown)	Federalist	Jun 17, 1801 – Mar 3, 1805	Elected in 1801 to finish Livermore's term.	3	7th	3	Elected in 1800. Resigned.	Mar 4, 1801 – Jun 14, 1802	Federalist	James Sheafe (Portsmouth)	2
3	Simeon Olcott (Charlestown)	Federalist	Jun 17, 1801 – Mar 3, 1805	Elected in 1801 to finish Livermore's term.	3	7th	3		Jun 14, 1802 – Jun 17, 1802	Vacant		
3	Simeon Olcott (Charlestown)	Federalist	Jun 17, 1801 – Mar 3, 1805	Elected in 1801 to finish Livermore's term.	3	7th	3	Elected in 1802 to finish Sheafe's term. Retired.	Jun 17, 1802 – Mar 3, 1807	Federalist	William Plumer (Epping)	3
3	Simeon Olcott (Charlestown)	Federalist	Jun 17, 1801 – Mar 3, 1805	Elected in 1801 to finish Livermore's term.	3	8th	3	Elected in 1802 to finish Sheafe's term. Retired.	Jun 17, 1802 – Mar 3, 1807	Federalist	William Plumer (Epping)	3
4	Nicholas Gilman (Exeter)	Democratic- Republican	Mar 4, 1805 – May 2, 1814	Elected in 1804.	4	9th	3	Elected in 1802 to finish Sheafe's term. Retired.	Jun 17, 1802 – Mar 3, 1807	Federalist	William Plumer (Epping)	3
4	Nicholas Gilman (Exeter)	Democratic- Republican	Mar 4, 1805 – May 2, 1814	Elected in 1804.	4	10th	4	Elected in 1807. Resigned.	Mar 4, 1807 – Jun 1, 1810	Democratic- Republican	Nahum Parker (Fitzwilliam)	4
4	Nicholas Gilman (Exeter)	Democratic- Republican	Mar 4, 1805 – May 2, 1814	Elected in 1804.	4	11th	4	Elected in 1807. Resigned.	Mar 4, 1807 – Jun 1, 1810	Democratic- Republican	Nahum Parker (Fitzwilliam)	4
4	Nicholas Gilman (Exeter)	Democratic- Republican	Mar 4, 1805 – May 2, 1814	Elected in 1804.	4	11th	4		Jun 1, 1810 – Jun 21, 1810	Vacant		
4	Nicholas Gilman (Exeter)	Democratic- Republican	Mar 4, 1805 – May 2, 1814	Elected in 1804.	4	11th	4	Elected in 1810 to finish Parker's term.	Jun 21, 1810 – Mar 3, 1813	Federalist	Charles Cutts (Portsmouth)	5
4	Nicholas Gilman (Exeter)	Democratic- Republican	Mar 4, 1805 – May 2, 1814	Re-elected in 1810. Died.	5	12th	4	Elected in 1810 to finish Parker's term.	Jun 21, 1810 – Mar 3, 1813	Federalist	Charles Cutts (Portsmouth)	5
4	Nicholas Gilman (Exeter)	Democratic- Republican	Mar 4, 1805 – May 2, 1814	Re-elected in 1810. Died.	5	13th	5	Legislature failed to elect.	Mar 4, 1813 – Apr 2, 1813	Vacant		5
4	Nicholas Gilman (Exeter)	Democratic- Republican	Mar 4, 1805 – May 2, 1814	Re-elected in 1810. Died.	5	13th	5	Appointed to continue the term. Retired when successor elected.	Apr 2, 1813 – Jun 10, 1813	Federalist	Charles Cutts (Portsmouth)	5
4	Nicholas Gilman (Exeter)	Democratic- Republican	Mar 4, 1805 – May 2, 1814	Re-elected in 1810. Died.	5	13th	5	Elected in 1813 to finish the vacant term that happened in 1813. Resigned.	Jun 10, 1813 – Jun 16, 1817	Federalist	Jeremiah Mason (Portsmouth)	6
Vacant			May 2, 1814 – Jun 24, 1814		5	13th	5	Elected in 1813 to finish the vacant term that happened in 1813. Resigned.	Jun 10, 1813 – Jun 16, 1817	Federalist	Jeremiah Mason (Portsmouth)	6
5	Thomas W. Thompson (Concord)	Federalist	Jun 24, 1814 – Mar 3, 1817	Elected in 1814 to finish Gilman's term.	5	13th	5	Elected in 1813 to finish the vacant term that happened in 1813. Resigned.	Jun 10, 1813 – Jun 16, 1817	Federalist	Jeremiah Mason (Portsmouth)	6
5	Thomas W. Thompson (Concord)	Federalist	Jun 24, 1814 – Mar 3, 1817	Elected in 1814 to finish Gilman's term.	5	14th	5	Elected in 1813 to finish the vacant term that happened in 1813. Resigned.	Jun 10, 1813 – Jun 16, 1817	Federalist	Jeremiah Mason (Portsmouth)	6
6	David L. Morril (Goffstown)	Democratic- Republican	Mar 4, 1817 – Mar 3, 1823	Elected in 1816. Retired.	6	15th	5	Elected in 1813 to finish the vacant term that happened in 1813. Resigned.	Jun 10, 1813 – Jun 16, 1817	Federalist	Jeremiah Mason (Portsmouth)	6
6	David L. Morril (Goffstown)	Democratic- Republican	Mar 4, 1817 – Mar 3, 1823	Elected in 1816. Retired.	6	15th	5		Jun 16, 1817 – Jun 27, 1817	Vacant		
6	David L. Morril (Goffstown)	Democratic- Republican	Mar 4, 1817 – Mar 3, 1823	Elected in 1816. Retired.	6	15th	5	Elected in 1817 to finish the vacant term that happened in 1813.	Jun 27, 1817 – Mar 3, 1819	Democratic- Republican	Clement Storer (Portsmouth)	7
6	David L. Morril (Goffstown)	Democratic- Republican	Mar 4, 1817 – Mar 3, 1823	Elected in 1816. Retired.	6	16th	6	Elected in 1818.	Mar 4, 1819 – Mar 3, 1825	Democratic- Republican	John Fabyan Parrott (Portsmouth)	8
6	David L. Morril (Goffstown)	Democratic- Republican	Mar 4, 1817 – Mar 3, 1823	Elected in 1816. Retired.	6	17th	6	Elected in 1818.	Mar 4, 1819 – Mar 3, 1825	Democratic- Republican	John Fabyan Parrott (Portsmouth)	8
7	Samuel Bell (Chester)	Democratic- Republican	Mar 4, 1823 – Mar 3, 1835	Elected in 1823.	7	18th	6	Elected in 1818.	Mar 4, 1819 – Mar 3, 1825	Democratic- Republican	John Fabyan Parrott (Portsmouth)	8
7	Samuel Bell (Chester)	National; Republican	Mar 4, 1823 – Mar 3, 1835	Elected in 1823.	7	19th	7		Mar 3, 1825 – Mar 16, 1825	Vacant		
7	Samuel Bell (Chester)	National; Republican	Mar 4, 1823 – Mar 3, 1835	Elected in 1823.	7	19th	7	Elected in 1825.	Mar 16, 1825 – Mar 3, 1831	Jacksonian	Levi Woodbury (Portsmouth)	9
7	Samuel Bell (Chester)	National; Republican	Mar 4, 1823 – Mar 3, 1835	Elected in 1823.	7	20th	7	Elected in 1825.	Mar 16, 1825 – Mar 3, 1831	Jacksonian	Levi Woodbury (Portsmouth)	9
7	Samuel Bell (Chester)	National; Republican	Mar 4, 1823 – Mar 3, 1835	Re-elected in 1828 or 1829. Retired.	8	21st	7	Elected in 1825.	Mar 16, 1825 – Mar 3, 1831	Jacksonian	Levi Woodbury (Portsmouth)	9
7	Samuel Bell (Chester)	National; Republican	Mar 4, 1823 – Mar 3, 1835	Re-elected in 1828 or 1829. Retired.	8	22nd	8	Elected in 1831. Resigned to become Governor of New Hampshire.	Mar 4, 1831 – May 30, 1836	Jacksonian	Isaac Hill (Concord)	10
7	Samuel Bell (Chester)	National; Republican	Mar 4, 1823 – Mar 3, 1835	Re-elected in 1828 or 1829. Retired.	8	23rd	8	Elected in 1831. Resigned to become Governor of New Hampshire.	Mar 4, 1831 – May 30, 1836	Jacksonian	Isaac Hill (Concord)	10
8	Henry Hubbard (Charlestown)	Jacksonian	Mar 4, 1835 – Mar 3, 1841	Elected in 1835. Retired to run for Governor of New Hampshire.	9	24th	8	Elected in 1831. Resigned to become Governor of New Hampshire.	Mar 4, 1831 – May 30, 1836	Jacksonian	Isaac Hill (Concord)	10
8	Henry Hubbard (Charlestown)	Jacksonian	Mar 4, 1835 – Mar 3, 1841	Elected in 1835. Retired to run for Governor of New Hampshire.	9	24th	8		May 30, 1836 – Jun 8, 1836	Vacant		
8	Henry Hubbard (Charlestown)	Jacksonian	Mar 4, 1835 – Mar 3, 1841	Elected in 1835. Retired to run for Governor of New Hampshire.	9	24th	8	Elected in 1836 to finish Hill's term. Lost re-election.	Jun 8, 1836 – Mar 3, 1837	Jacksonian	John Page (Haverhill)	11
8	Henry Hubbard (Charlestown)	Democratic	Mar 4, 1835 – Mar 3, 1841	Elected in 1835. Retired to run for Governor of New Hampshire.	9	25th	9	Elected in 1837. Resigned.	Mar 4, 1837 – Feb 28, 1842	Democratic	Franklin Pierce (Concord)	12
8	Henry Hubbard (Charlestown)	Democratic	Mar 4, 1835 – Mar 3, 1841	Elected in 1835. Retired to run for Governor of New Hampshire.	9	26th	9	Elected in 1837. Resigned.	Mar 4, 1837 – Feb 28, 1842	Democratic	Franklin Pierce (Concord)	12
9	Levi Woodbury (Portsmouth)	Democratic	Mar 4, 1841 – Sep 20, 1845	Elected in 1841. Resigned to become a Justice of the U.S. Supreme Court.	10	27th	9	Elected in 1837. Resigned.	Mar 4, 1837 – Feb 28, 1842	Democratic	Franklin Pierce (Concord)	12
9	Levi Woodbury (Portsmouth)	Democratic	Mar 4, 1841 – Sep 20, 1845	Elected in 1841. Resigned to become a Justice of the U.S. Supreme Court.	10	27th	9	Appointed to continue Pierce's term. Elected in 1842 to finish Pierce's term.	Mar 1, 1842 – Mar 3, 1843	Democratic	Leonard Wilcox (Orford)	13
9	Levi Woodbury (Portsmouth)	Democratic	Mar 4, 1841 – Sep 20, 1845	Elected in 1841. Resigned to become a Justice of the U.S. Supreme Court.	10	28th	10	Elected in 1843.	Mar 4, 1843 – Mar 3, 1849	Democratic	Charles G. Atherton (Nashua)	14
9	Levi Woodbury (Portsmouth)	Democratic	Mar 4, 1841 – Sep 20, 1845	Elected in 1841. Resigned to become a Justice of the U.S. Supreme Court.	10	29th	10	Elected in 1843.	Mar 4, 1843 – Mar 3, 1849	Democratic	Charles G. Atherton (Nashua)	14
Vacant			Sep 20, 1845 – Dec 1, 1845		10	29th	10	Elected in 1843.	Mar 4, 1843 – Mar 3, 1849	Democratic	Charles G. Atherton (Nashua)	14
10	Benning W. Jenness (Strafford)	Democratic	Dec 1, 1845 – Jun 13, 1846	Appointed to continue Woodbury's term. Lost election to finish Woodbury's term.	10	29th	10	Elected in 1843.	Mar 4, 1843 – Mar 3, 1849	Democratic	Charles G. Atherton (Nashua)	14
11	Joseph Cilley (Nottingham)	Liberty	Jun 13, 1846 – Mar 3, 1847	Elected in 1846 to finish Woodbury's term. Lost election to next term.	10	29th	10	Elected in 1843.	Mar 4, 1843 – Mar 3, 1849	Democratic	Charles G. Atherton (Nashua)	14
12	John P. Hale (Dover)	Independent; Democratic	Mar 4, 1847 – Mar 3, 1853	Elected in 1846. Retired to run for President of the United States.	11	30th	10	Elected in 1843.	Mar 4, 1843 – Mar 3, 1849	Democratic	Charles G. Atherton (Nashua)	14
12	John P. Hale (Dover)	Free Soil	Mar 4, 1847 – Mar 3, 1853	Elected in 1846. Retired to run for President of the United States.	11	31st	11	Elected in 1848 or 1849. Died.	Mar 4, 1849 – Jan 11, 1855	Democratic	Moses Norris Jr. (Manchester)	15
12	John P. Hale (Dover)	Free Soil	Mar 4, 1847 – Mar 3, 1853	Elected in 1846. Retired to run for President of the United States.	11	32nd	11	Elected in 1848 or 1849. Died.	Mar 4, 1849 – Jan 11, 1855	Democratic	Moses Norris Jr. (Manchester)	15
13	Charles G. Atherton (Nashua)	Democratic	Mar 4, 1853 – Nov 15, 1853	Elected in 1852. Died.	12	33rd	11	Elected in 1848 or 1849. Died.	Mar 4, 1849 – Jan 11, 1855	Democratic	Moses Norris Jr. (Manchester)	15
Vacant			Nov 15, 1853 – Nov 29, 1853		12	33rd	11	Elected in 1848 or 1849. Died.	Mar 4, 1849 – Jan 11, 1855	Democratic	Moses Norris Jr. (Manchester)	15
14	Jared W. Williams (Lancaster)	Democratic	Nov 29, 1853 – Jul 15, 1854	Appointed to continue Atherton's term. Appointment expired without election.	12	33rd	11	Elected in 1848 or 1849. Died.	Mar 4, 1849 – Jan 11, 1855	Democratic	Moses Norris Jr. (Manchester)	15
Vacant			Jul 15, 1854 – Jul 30, 1855		12	33rd	11	Elected in 1848 or 1849. Died.	Mar 4, 1849 – Jan 11, 1855	Democratic	Moses Norris Jr. (Manchester)	15
Vacant			Jul 15, 1854 – Jul 30, 1855		12	33rd	11		Jan 11, 1855 – Jan 16, 1855	Vacant		
Vacant			Jul 15, 1854 – Jul 30, 1855		12	33rd	11	Appointed to finish Norris's term.	Jan 16, 1855 – Mar 3, 1855	Democratic	John S. Wells (Exeter)	16
Vacant			Jul 15, 1854 – Jul 30, 1855		12	34th	12	Legislature failed to elect.	Mar 4, 1855 – Jul 29, 1855	Vacant		
15	John P. Hale (Dover)	Republican	Jul 30, 1855 – Mar 3, 1865	Elected in 1855 to finish Atherton's term.	12	34th	12	Elected late in 1855. Died.	Jul 30, 1855 – May 26, 1857	Republican	James Bell (Laconia)	17
15	John P. Hale (Dover)	Republican	Jul 30, 1855 – Mar 3, 1865	Elected in 1855 to finish Atherton's term.	12	35th	12	Elected late in 1855. Died.	Jul 30, 1855 – May 26, 1857	Republican	James Bell (Laconia)	17
15	John P. Hale (Dover)	Republican	Jul 30, 1855 – Mar 3, 1865	Elected in 1855 to finish Atherton's term.	12	35th	12		May 26, 1857 – Jun 27, 1857	Vacant		
15	John P. Hale (Dover)	Republican	Jul 30, 1855 – Mar 3, 1865	Elected in 1855 to finish Atherton's term.	12	35th	12	Elected in 1857 to finish Bell's term.	Jun 27, 1857 – Jul 27, 1866	Republican	Daniel Clark (Manchester)	18
15	John P. Hale (Dover)	Republican	Jul 30, 1855 – Mar 3, 1865	Re-elected in 1859 Lost re-nomination.	13	36th	12	Elected in 1857 to finish Bell's term.	Jun 27, 1857 – Jul 27, 1866	Republican	Daniel Clark (Manchester)	18
15	John P. Hale (Dover)	Republican	Jul 30, 1855 – Mar 3, 1865	Re-elected in 1859 Lost re-nomination.	13	37th	13	Re-elected in 1861. Resigned to become a District Court Judge for New Hampshire.	Jun 27, 1857 – Jul 27, 1866	Republican	Daniel Clark (Manchester)	18
15	John P. Hale (Dover)	Republican	Jul 30, 1855 – Mar 3, 1865	Re-elected in 1859 Lost re-nomination.	13	38th	13	Re-elected in 1861. Resigned to become a District Court Judge for New Hampshire.	Jun 27, 1857 – Jul 27, 1866	Republican	Daniel Clark (Manchester)	18
16	Aaron H. Cragin (Lebanon)	Republican	Mar 4, 1865 – Mar 3, 1877	Elected in 1864.	14	39th	13	Re-elected in 1861. Resigned to become a District Court Judge for New Hampshire.	Jun 27, 1857 – Jul 27, 1866	Republican	Daniel Clark (Manchester)	18
16	Aaron H. Cragin (Lebanon)	Republican	Mar 4, 1865 – Mar 3, 1877	Elected in 1864.	14	39th	13		Jul 27, 1866 – Aug 31, 1866	Vacant		
16	Aaron H. Cragin (Lebanon)	Republican	Mar 4, 1865 – Mar 3, 1877	Elected in 1864.	14	39th	13	Appointed to finish Clark's term. Retired.	Aug 31, 1866 – Mar 3, 1867	Republican	George G. Fogg (Concord)	19
16	Aaron H. Cragin (Lebanon)	Republican	Mar 4, 1865 – Mar 3, 1877	Elected in 1864.	14	40th	14	Elected in 1866 or 1867. Lost renomination.	Mar 4, 1867 – Mar 3, 1873	Republican	James W. Patterson (Hanover)	20
16	Aaron H. Cragin (Lebanon)	Republican	Mar 4, 1865 – Mar 3, 1877	Elected in 1864.	14	41st	14	Elected in 1866 or 1867. Lost renomination.	Mar 4, 1867 – Mar 3, 1873	Republican	James W. Patterson (Hanover)	20
16	Aaron H. Cragin (Lebanon)	Republican	Mar 4, 1865 – Mar 3, 1877	Re-elected in 1870.	15	42nd	14	Elected in 1866 or 1867. Lost renomination.	Mar 4, 1867 – Mar 3, 1873	Republican	James W. Patterson (Hanover)	20
16	Aaron H. Cragin (Lebanon)	Republican	Mar 4, 1865 – Mar 3, 1877	Re-elected in 1870.	15	43rd	15	Elected in 1872. Lost re-election.	Mar 4, 1873 – Mar 3, 1879	Republican	Bainbridge Wadleigh (Milford)	21
16	Aaron H. Cragin (Lebanon)	Republican	Mar 4, 1865 – Mar 3, 1877	Re-elected in 1870.	15	44th	15	Elected in 1872. Lost re-election.	Mar 4, 1873 – Mar 3, 1879	Republican	Bainbridge Wadleigh (Milford)	21
17	Edward H. Rollins (Concord)	Republican	Mar 4, 1877 – Mar 3, 1883	Elected in 1876. Lost re-election.	16	45th	15	Elected in 1872. Lost re-election.	Mar 4, 1873 – Mar 3, 1879	Republican	Bainbridge Wadleigh (Milford)	21
17	Edward H. Rollins (Concord)	Republican	Mar 4, 1877 – Mar 3, 1883	Elected in 1876. Lost re-election.	16	46th	16	Legislature failed to elect.	Mar 3, 1879 – Mar 18, 1879	Vacant		
17	Edward H. Rollins (Concord)	Republican	Mar 4, 1877 – Mar 3, 1883	Elected in 1876. Lost re-election.	16	46th	16	Appointed to fill vacancy caused by legislature's failure to elect. Retired.	Mar 18, 1879 – Jun 18, 1879	Republican	Charles H. Bell (Exeter)	22
17	Edward H. Rollins (Concord)	Republican	Mar 4, 1877 – Mar 3, 1883	Elected in 1876. Lost re-election.	16	46th	16		Jun 18, 1879 – Jun 20, 1879	Vacant		
17	Edward H. Rollins (Concord)	Republican	Mar 4, 1877 – Mar 3, 1883	Elected in 1876. Lost re-election.	16	46th	16	Elected in 1879 to finish the vacant term.	Jun 20, 1879 – Mar 3, 1885	Republican	Henry W. Blair (Manchester)	23
17	Edward H. Rollins (Concord)	Republican	Mar 4, 1877 – Mar 3, 1883	Elected in 1876. Lost re-election.	16	47th	16	Elected in 1879 to finish the vacant term.	Jun 20, 1879 – Mar 3, 1885	Republican	Henry W. Blair (Manchester)	23
Vacant			Mar 4, 1883 – Aug 2, 1883	Legislature failed to elect.	17	48th	16	Elected in 1879 to finish the vacant term.	Jun 20, 1879 – Mar 3, 1885	Republican	Henry W. Blair (Manchester)	23
18	Austin F. Pike (Franklin)	Republican	Aug 2, 1883 – Oct 8, 1886	Elected late in 1883. Died.	17	48th	16	Elected in 1879 to finish the vacant term.	Jun 20, 1879 – Mar 3, 1885	Republican	Henry W. Blair (Manchester)	23
18	Austin F. Pike (Franklin)	Republican	Aug 2, 1883 – Oct 8, 1886	Elected late in 1883. Died.	17	49th	17	Legislature failed to elect.	Mar 3, 1885 – Mar 5, 1885	Vacant		23
18	Austin F. Pike (Franklin)	Republican	Aug 2, 1883 – Oct 8, 1886	Elected late in 1883. Died.	17	49th	17	Appointed to continue the vacant term. Elected in 1885 to finish the vacant term. Lost renomination.	Mar 5, 1885 – Mar 3, 1891	Republican	Henry W. Blair (Manchester)	23
Vacant			Oct 8, 1886 – Nov 14, 1886		17	49th	17	Appointed to continue the vacant term. Elected in 1885 to finish the vacant term. Lost renomination.	Mar 5, 1885 – Mar 3, 1891	Republican	Henry W. Blair (Manchester)	23
19	Person Colby Cheney (Manchester)	Republican	Nov 14, 1886 – Jun 14, 1887	Appointed to continue Pike's term. Retired when successor qualified.	17	49th	17	Appointed to continue the vacant term. Elected in 1885 to finish the vacant term. Lost renomination.	Mar 5, 1885 – Mar 3, 1891	Republican	Henry W. Blair (Manchester)	23
19	Person Colby Cheney (Manchester)	Republican	Nov 14, 1886 – Jun 14, 1887	Appointed to continue Pike's term. Retired when successor qualified.	17	50th	17	Appointed to continue the vacant term. Elected in 1885 to finish the vacant term. Lost renomination.	Mar 5, 1885 – Mar 3, 1891	Republican	Henry W. Blair (Manchester)	23
20	Bill Chandler (Concord)	Republican	Jun 14, 1887 – Mar 3, 1889	Elected in 1887 to finish Pike's term. Legislature failed to elect.	17	50th	17	Appointed to continue the vacant term. Elected in 1885 to finish the vacant term. Lost renomination.	Mar 5, 1885 – Mar 3, 1891	Republican	Henry W. Blair (Manchester)	23
21	Gilman Marston (Exeter)	Republican	Mar 4, 1889 – Jun 18, 1889	Appointed to start term when legislature failed to elect.	18	51st	17	Appointed to continue the vacant term. Elected in 1885 to finish the vacant term. Lost renomination.	Mar 5, 1885 – Mar 3, 1891	Republican	Henry W. Blair (Manchester)	23
22	Bill Chandler (Concord)	Republican	Jun 18, 1889 – Mar 3, 1901	Elected in 1889 to finish the term.	18	51st	17	Appointed to continue the vacant term. Elected in 1885 to finish the vacant term. Lost renomination.	Mar 5, 1885 – Mar 3, 1891	Republican	Henry W. Blair (Manchester)	23
22	Bill Chandler (Concord)	Republican	Jun 18, 1889 – Mar 3, 1901	Elected in 1889 to finish the term.	18	52nd	18	Elected in 1891.	Mar 4, 1891 – Aug 17, 1918	Republican	Jacob H. Gallinger (Concord)	24
22	Bill Chandler (Concord)	Republican	Jun 18, 1889 – Mar 3, 1901	Elected in 1889 to finish the term.	18	53rd	18	Elected in 1891.	Mar 4, 1891 – Aug 17, 1918	Republican	Jacob H. Gallinger (Concord)	24
22	Bill Chandler (Concord)	Republican	Jun 18, 1889 – Mar 3, 1901	Re-elected in 1895. Lost renomination.	19	54th	18	Elected in 1891.	Mar 4, 1891 – Aug 17, 1918	Republican	Jacob H. Gallinger (Concord)	24
22	Bill Chandler (Concord)	Republican	Jun 18, 1889 – Mar 3, 1901	Re-elected in 1895. Lost renomination.	19	55th	19	Re-elected in 1897.	Mar 4, 1891 – Aug 17, 1918	Republican	Jacob H. Gallinger (Concord)	24
22	Bill Chandler (Concord)	Republican	Jun 18, 1889 – Mar 3, 1901	Re-elected in 1895. Lost renomination.	19	56th	19	Re-elected in 1897.	Mar 4, 1891 – Aug 17, 1918	Republican	Jacob H. Gallinger (Concord)	24
23	Henry E. Burnham (Manchester)	Republican	Mar 4, 1901 – Mar 3, 1913	Elected in 1901.	20	57th	19	Re-elected in 1897.	Mar 4, 1891 – Aug 17, 1918	Republican	Jacob H. Gallinger (Concord)	24
23	Henry E. Burnham (Manchester)	Republican	Mar 4, 1901 – Mar 3, 1913	Elected in 1901.	20	58th	20	Re-elected in 1903.	Mar 4, 1891 – Aug 17, 1918	Republican	Jacob H. Gallinger (Concord)	24
23	Henry E. Burnham (Manchester)	Republican	Mar 4, 1901 – Mar 3, 1913	Elected in 1901.	20	59th	20	Re-elected in 1903.	Mar 4, 1891 – Aug 17, 1918	Republican	Jacob H. Gallinger (Concord)	24
23	Henry E. Burnham (Manchester)	Republican	Mar 4, 1901 – Mar 3, 1913	Re-elected in 1907. Retired.	21	60th	20	Re-elected in 1903.	Mar 4, 1891 – Aug 17, 1918	Republican	Jacob H. Gallinger (Concord)	24
23	Henry E. Burnham (Manchester)	Republican	Mar 4, 1901 – Mar 3, 1913	Re-elected in 1907. Retired.	21	61st	21	Re-elected in 1909.	Mar 4, 1891 – Aug 17, 1918	Republican	Jacob H. Gallinger (Concord)	24
23	Henry E. Burnham (Manchester)	Republican	Mar 4, 1901 – Mar 3, 1913	Re-elected in 1907. Retired.	21	62nd	21	Re-elected in 1909.	Mar 4, 1891 – Aug 17, 1918	Republican	Jacob H. Gallinger (Concord)	24
Vacant			Mar 4, 1913 – Mar 13, 1913	Legislature elected late.	22	63rd	21	Re-elected in 1909.	Mar 4, 1891 – Aug 17, 1918	Republican	Jacob H. Gallinger (Concord)	24
24	Henry F. Hollis (Concord)	Democratic	Mar 13, 1913 – Mar 3, 1919	Elected late in 1913. Retired.	22	63rd	21	Re-elected in 1909.	Mar 4, 1891 – Aug 17, 1918	Republican	Jacob H. Gallinger (Concord)	24
24	Henry F. Hollis (Concord)	Democratic	Mar 13, 1913 – Mar 3, 1919	Elected late in 1913. Retired.	22	64th	22	Re-elected in 1914. Died.	Mar 4, 1891 – Aug 17, 1918	Republican	Jacob H. Gallinger (Concord)	24
24	Henry F. Hollis (Concord)	Democratic	Mar 13, 1913 – Mar 3, 1919	Elected late in 1913. Retired.	22	65th	22	Re-elected in 1914. Died.	Mar 4, 1891 – Aug 17, 1918	Republican	Jacob H. Gallinger (Concord)	24
24	Henry F. Hollis (Concord)	Democratic	Mar 13, 1913 – Mar 3, 1919	Elected late in 1913. Retired.	22	65th	22		Aug 17, 1918 – Sep 2, 1918	Vacant		
24	Henry F. Hollis (Concord)	Democratic	Mar 13, 1913 – Mar 3, 1919	Elected late in 1913. Retired.	22	65th	22	Appointed to continue Gallinger's term. Retired.	Sep 2, 1918 – Nov 5, 1918	Republican	Irving W. Drew (Lancaster)	25
24	Henry F. Hollis (Concord)	Democratic	Mar 13, 1913 – Mar 3, 1919	Elected late in 1913. Retired.	22	65th	22	Elected in 1918 to finish Gallinger's term.	Nov 6, 1918 – Mar 3, 1933	Republican	George H. Moses (Concord)	26
25	Henry W. Keyes (Haverhill)	Republican	Mar 4, 1919 – Jan 3, 1937	Elected in 1918.	23	66th	22	Elected in 1918 to finish Gallinger's term.	Nov 6, 1918 – Mar 3, 1933	Republican	George H. Moses (Concord)	26
25	Henry W. Keyes (Haverhill)	Republican	Mar 4, 1919 – Jan 3, 1937	Elected in 1918.	23	67th	23	Re-elected in 1920.	Nov 6, 1918 – Mar 3, 1933	Republican	George H. Moses (Concord)	26
25	Henry W. Keyes (Haverhill)	Republican	Mar 4, 1919 – Jan 3, 1937	Elected in 1918.	23	68th	23	Re-elected in 1920.	Nov 6, 1918 – Mar 3, 1933	Republican	George H. Moses (Concord)	26
25	Henry W. Keyes (Haverhill)	Republican	Mar 4, 1919 – Jan 3, 1937	Re-elected in 1924.	24	69th	23	Re-elected in 1920.	Nov 6, 1918 – Mar 3, 1933	Republican	George H. Moses (Concord)	26
25	Henry W. Keyes (Haverhill)	Republican	Mar 4, 1919 – Jan 3, 1937	Re-elected in 1924.	24	70th	24	Re-elected in 1926. Lost re-election.	Nov 6, 1918 – Mar 3, 1933	Republican	George H. Moses (Concord)	26
25	Henry W. Keyes (Haverhill)	Republican	Mar 4, 1919 – Jan 3, 1937	Re-elected in 1924.	24	71st	24	Re-elected in 1926. Lost re-election.	Nov 6, 1918 – Mar 3, 1933	Republican	George H. Moses (Concord)	26
25	Henry W. Keyes (Haverhill)	Republican	Mar 4, 1919 – Jan 3, 1937	Re-elected in 1930. Retired.	25	72nd	24	Re-elected in 1926. Lost re-election.	Nov 6, 1918 – Mar 3, 1933	Republican	George H. Moses (Concord)	26
25	Henry W. Keyes (Haverhill)	Republican	Mar 4, 1919 – Jan 3, 1937	Re-elected in 1930. Retired.	25	73rd	25	Elected in 1932. Lost re-election.	Mar 4, 1933 – Jan 3, 1939	Democratic	Fred H. Brown (Somersworth)	27
25	Henry W. Keyes (Haverhill)	Republican	Mar 4, 1919 – Jan 3, 1937	Re-elected in 1930. Retired.	25	74th	25	Elected in 1932. Lost re-election.	Mar 4, 1933 – Jan 3, 1939	Democratic	Fred H. Brown (Somersworth)	27
26	Styles Bridges (Concord)	Republican	Jan 3, 1937 – Nov 26, 1961	Elected in 1936.	26	75th	25	Elected in 1932. Lost re-election.	Mar 4, 1933 – Jan 3, 1939	Democratic	Fred H. Brown (Somersworth)	27
26	Styles Bridges (Concord)	Republican	Jan 3, 1937 – Nov 26, 1961	Elected in 1936.	26	76th	26	Elected in 1938.	Jan 3, 1939 – Jul 24, 1953	Republican	Charles W. Tobey (Temple)	28
26	Styles Bridges (Concord)	Republican	Jan 3, 1937 – Nov 26, 1961	Elected in 1936.	26	77th	26	Elected in 1938.	Jan 3, 1939 – Jul 24, 1953	Republican	Charles W. Tobey (Temple)	28
26	Styles Bridges (Concord)	Republican	Jan 3, 1937 – Nov 26, 1961	Re-elected in 1942.	27	78th	26	Elected in 1938.	Jan 3, 1939 – Jul 24, 1953	Republican	Charles W. Tobey (Temple)	28
26	Styles Bridges (Concord)	Republican	Jan 3, 1937 – Nov 26, 1961	Re-elected in 1942.	27	79th	27	Re-elected in 1944.	Jan 3, 1939 – Jul 24, 1953	Republican	Charles W. Tobey (Temple)	28
26	Styles Bridges (Concord)	Republican	Jan 3, 1937 – Nov 26, 1961	Re-elected in 1942.	27	80th	27	Re-elected in 1944.	Jan 3, 1939 – Jul 24, 1953	Republican	Charles W. Tobey (Temple)	28
26	Styles Bridges (Concord)	Republican	Jan 3, 1937 – Nov 26, 1961	Re-elected in 1948.	28	81st	27	Re-elected in 1944.	Jan 3, 1939 – Jul 24, 1953	Republican	Charles W. Tobey (Temple)	28
26	Styles Bridges (Concord)	Republican	Jan 3, 1937 – Nov 26, 1961	Re-elected in 1948.	28	82nd	28	Re-elected in 1950. Died.	Jan 3, 1939 – Jul 24, 1953	Republican	Charles W. Tobey (Temple)	28
26	Styles Bridges (Concord)	Republican	Jan 3, 1937 – Nov 26, 1961	Re-elected in 1948.	28	83rd	28	Re-elected in 1950. Died.	Jan 3, 1939 – Jul 24, 1953	Republican	Charles W. Tobey (Temple)	28
26	Styles Bridges (Concord)	Republican	Jan 3, 1937 – Nov 26, 1961	Re-elected in 1948.	28	83rd	28		Jul 24, 1953 – Aug 14, 1953	Vacant		
26	Styles Bridges (Concord)	Republican	Jan 3, 1937 – Nov 26, 1961	Re-elected in 1948.	28	83rd	28	Appointed to continue Tobey's term. Lost nomination to finish Tobey's term.	Aug 14, 1953 – Nov 7, 1954	Republican	Robert W. Upton (Concord)	29
26	Styles Bridges (Concord)	Republican	Jan 3, 1937 – Nov 26, 1961	Re-elected in 1948.	28	83rd	28	Elected in 1954 to finish Tobey's term.	Nov 8, 1954 – Dec 31, 1974	Republican	Norris Cotton (Lebanon)	30
26	Styles Bridges (Concord)	Republican	Jan 3, 1937 – Nov 26, 1961	Re-elected in 1954.	29	84th	28	Elected in 1954 to finish Tobey's term.	Nov 8, 1954 – Dec 31, 1974	Republican	Norris Cotton (Lebanon)	30
26	Styles Bridges (Concord)	Republican	Jan 3, 1937 – Nov 26, 1961	Re-elected in 1954.	29	85th	29	Re-elected in 1956.	Nov 8, 1954 – Dec 31, 1974	Republican	Norris Cotton (Lebanon)	30
26	Styles Bridges (Concord)	Republican	Jan 3, 1937 – Nov 26, 1961	Re-elected in 1954.	29	86th	29	Re-elected in 1956.	Nov 8, 1954 – Dec 31, 1974	Republican	Norris Cotton (Lebanon)	30
26	Styles Bridges (Concord)	Republican	Jan 3, 1937 – Nov 26, 1961	Re-elected in 1960. Died.	30	87th	29	Re-elected in 1956.	Nov 8, 1954 – Dec 31, 1974	Republican	Norris Cotton (Lebanon)	30
Vacant			Nov 26, 1961 – Jan 10, 1962		30	87th	29	Re-elected in 1956.	Nov 8, 1954 – Dec 31, 1974	Republican	Norris Cotton (Lebanon)	30
27	Mo Murphy (Portsmouth)	Republican	Jan 10, 1962 – Nov 6, 1962	Appointed to continue Bridges's term. Lost nomination to finish Bridges's term.	30	87th	29	Re-elected in 1956.	Nov 8, 1954 – Dec 31, 1974	Republican	Norris Cotton (Lebanon)	30
28	Thomas J. McIntyre (Laconia)	Democratic	Nov 7, 1962 – Jan 3, 1979	Elected in 1962 to finish Bridge's term.	30	87th	29	Re-elected in 1956.	Nov 8, 1954 – Dec 31, 1974	Republican	Norris Cotton (Lebanon)	30
28	Thomas J. McIntyre (Laconia)	Democratic	Nov 7, 1962 – Jan 3, 1979	Elected in 1962 to finish Bridge's term.	30	88th	30	Re-elected in 1962.	Nov 8, 1954 – Dec 31, 1974	Republican	Norris Cotton (Lebanon)	30
28	Thomas J. McIntyre (Laconia)	Democratic	Nov 7, 1962 – Jan 3, 1979	Elected in 1962 to finish Bridge's term.	30	89th	30	Re-elected in 1962.	Nov 8, 1954 – Dec 31, 1974	Republican	Norris Cotton (Lebanon)	30
28	Thomas J. McIntyre (Laconia)	Democratic	Nov 7, 1962 – Jan 3, 1979	Re-elected in 1966.	31	90th	30	Re-elected in 1962.	Nov 8, 1954 – Dec 31, 1974	Republican	Norris Cotton (Lebanon)	30
28	Thomas J. McIntyre (Laconia)	Democratic	Nov 7, 1962 – Jan 3, 1979	Re-elected in 1966.	31	91st	31	Re-elected in 1968. Retired, then resigned early.	Nov 8, 1954 – Dec 31, 1974	Republican	Norris Cotton (Lebanon)	30
28	Thomas J. McIntyre (Laconia)	Democratic	Nov 7, 1962 – Jan 3, 1979	Re-elected in 1966.	31	92nd	31	Re-elected in 1968. Retired, then resigned early.	Nov 8, 1954 – Dec 31, 1974	Republican	Norris Cotton (Lebanon)	30
28	Thomas J. McIntyre (Laconia)	Democratic	Nov 7, 1962 – Jan 3, 1979	Re-elected in 1972. Lost re-election.	32	93rd	31	Re-elected in 1968. Retired, then resigned early.	Nov 8, 1954 – Dec 31, 1974	Republican	Norris Cotton (Lebanon)	30
28	Thomas J. McIntyre (Laconia)	Democratic	Nov 7, 1962 – Jan 3, 1979	Re-elected in 1972. Lost re-election.	32	93rd	31	Appointed to finish Cotton's term. Term annulled.	Dec 31, 1974 – Jan 3, 1975	Republican	Louis Wyman (Manchester)	31
28	Thomas J. McIntyre (Laconia)	Democratic	Nov 7, 1962 – Jan 3, 1979	Re-elected in 1972. Lost re-election.	32	94th	32	Contested election.	Jan 3, 1975 – Aug 8, 1975	Vacant		
28	Thomas J. McIntyre (Laconia)	Democratic	Nov 7, 1962 – Jan 3, 1979	Re-elected in 1972. Lost re-election.	32	94th	32	Appointed to continue term after contested election. Resigned when successor elected.	Aug 8, 1975 – Sep 18, 1975	Republican	Norris Cotton (Lebanon)	32
28	Thomas J. McIntyre (Laconia)	Democratic	Nov 7, 1962 – Jan 3, 1979	Re-elected in 1972. Lost re-election.	32	94th	32	Elected to finish contested term. Lost re-election and resigned early.	Sep 18, 1975 – Dec 29, 1980	Democratic	John Durkin (Manchester)	33
28	Thomas J. McIntyre (Laconia)	Democratic	Nov 7, 1962 – Jan 3, 1979	Re-elected in 1972. Lost re-election.	32	95th	32	Elected to finish contested term. Lost re-election and resigned early.	Sep 18, 1975 – Dec 29, 1980	Democratic	John Durkin (Manchester)	33
29	Gordon Humphrey (Chichester)	Republican	Jan 3, 1979 – Dec 4, 1990	Elected in 1978.	33	96th	32	Elected to finish contested term. Lost re-election and resigned early.	Sep 18, 1975 – Dec 29, 1980	Democratic	John Durkin (Manchester)	33
29	Gordon Humphrey (Chichester)	Republican	Jan 3, 1979 – Dec 4, 1990	Elected in 1978.	33	96th	32	Appointed to finish contested term, having been elected to the next term.	Dec 29, 1980 – Jan 3, 1993	Republican	Warren Rudman (Hollis)	34
29	Gordon Humphrey (Chichester)	Republican	Jan 3, 1979 – Dec 4, 1990	Elected in 1978.	33	97th	33	Elected in 1980.	Dec 29, 1980 – Jan 3, 1993	Republican	Warren Rudman (Hollis)	34
29	Gordon Humphrey (Chichester)	Republican	Jan 3, 1979 – Dec 4, 1990	Elected in 1978.	33	98th	33	Elected in 1980.	Dec 29, 1980 – Jan 3, 1993	Republican	Warren Rudman (Hollis)	34
29	Gordon Humphrey (Chichester)	Republican	Jan 3, 1979 – Dec 4, 1990	Re-elected in 1984. Retired and resigned early to take his seat in the New Hampshire Senate.	34	99th	33	Elected in 1980.	Dec 29, 1980 – Jan 3, 1993	Republican	Warren Rudman (Hollis)	34
29	Gordon Humphrey (Chichester)	Republican	Jan 3, 1979 – Dec 4, 1990	Re-elected in 1984. Retired and resigned early to take his seat in the New Hampshire Senate.	34	100th	34	Re-elected in 1986. Retired.	Dec 29, 1980 – Jan 3, 1993	Republican	Warren Rudman (Hollis)	34
29	Gordon Humphrey (Chichester)	Republican	Jan 3, 1979 – Dec 4, 1990	Re-elected in 1984. Retired and resigned early to take his seat in the New Hampshire Senate.	34	101st	34	Re-elected in 1986. Retired.	Dec 29, 1980 – Jan 3, 1993	Republican	Warren Rudman (Hollis)	34
Vacant			Dec 4, 1990 – Dec 7, 1990		34	101st	34	Re-elected in 1986. Retired.	Dec 29, 1980 – Jan 3, 1993	Republican	Warren Rudman (Hollis)	34
30	Bob Smith (Tuftonboro)	Republican	Dec 7, 1990 – Jan 3, 2003	Appointed to finish Humphrey's term, having already been elected to the next term.	34	101st	34	Re-elected in 1986. Retired.	Dec 29, 1980 – Jan 3, 1993	Republican	Warren Rudman (Hollis)	34
30	Bob Smith (Tuftonboro)	Republican	Dec 7, 1990 – Jan 3, 2003	Elected in 1990.	35	102nd	34	Re-elected in 1986. Retired.	Dec 29, 1980 – Jan 3, 1993	Republican	Warren Rudman (Hollis)	34
30	Bob Smith (Tuftonboro)	Republican	Dec 7, 1990 – Jan 3, 2003	Elected in 1990.	35	103rd	35	Elected in 1992.	Jan 3, 1993 – Jan 3, 2011	Republican	Judd Gregg (Rye)	35
30	Bob Smith (Tuftonboro)	Republican	Dec 7, 1990 – Jan 3, 2003	Elected in 1990.	35	104th	35	Elected in 1992.	Jan 3, 1993 – Jan 3, 2011	Republican	Judd Gregg (Rye)	35
30	Bob Smith (Tuftonboro)	Republican	Dec 7, 1990 – Jan 3, 2003	Re-elected in 1996. Lost renomination.	36	105th	35	Elected in 1992.	Jan 3, 1993 – Jan 3, 2011	Republican	Judd Gregg (Rye)	35
30	Bob Smith (Tuftonboro)	Independent	Dec 7, 1990 – Jan 3, 2003	Re-elected in 1996. Lost renomination.	36	106th	36	Re-elected in 1998.	Jan 3, 1993 – Jan 3, 2011	Republican	Judd Gregg (Rye)	35
30	Bob Smith (Tuftonboro)	Republican	Dec 7, 1990 – Jan 3, 2003	Re-elected in 1996. Lost renomination.	36	107th	36	Re-elected in 1998.	Jan 3, 1993 – Jan 3, 2011	Republican	Judd Gregg (Rye)	35
31	John E. Sununu (Bedford)	Republican	Jan 3, 2003 – Jan 3, 2009	Elected in 2002. Lost re-election.	37	108th	36	Re-elected in 1998.	Jan 3, 1993 – Jan 3, 2011	Republican	Judd Gregg (Rye)	35
31	John E. Sununu (Bedford)	Republican	Jan 3, 2003 – Jan 3, 2009	Elected in 2002. Lost re-election.	37	109th	37	Re-elected in 2004. Retired.	Jan 3, 1993 – Jan 3, 2011	Republican	Judd Gregg (Rye)	35
31	John E. Sununu (Bedford)	Republican	Jan 3, 2003 – Jan 3, 2009	Elected in 2002. Lost re-election.	37	110th	37	Re-elected in 2004. Retired.	Jan 3, 1993 – Jan 3, 2011	Republican	Judd Gregg (Rye)	35
32	Jeanne Shaheen (Madbury)	Democratic	Jan 3, 2009 – present	Elected in 2008.	38	111th	37	Re-elected in 2004. Retired.	Jan 3, 1993 – Jan 3, 2011	Republican	Judd Gregg (Rye)	35
32	Jeanne Shaheen (Madbury)	Democratic	Jan 3, 2009 – present	Elected in 2008.	38	112th	38	Elected in 2010. Lost re-election.	Jan 3, 2011 – Jan 3, 2017	Republican	Kelly Ayotte (Nashua)	36
32	Jeanne Shaheen (Madbury)	Democratic	Jan 3, 2009 – present	Elected in 2008.	38	113th	38	Elected in 2010. Lost re-election.	Jan 3, 2011 – Jan 3, 2017	Republican	Kelly Ayotte (Nashua)	36
32	Jeanne Shaheen (Madbury)	Democratic	Jan 3, 2009 – present	Re-elected in 2014.	39	114th	38	Elected in 2010. Lost re-election.	Jan 3, 2011 – Jan 3, 2017	Republican	Kelly Ayotte (Nashua)	36
32	Jeanne Shaheen (Madbury)	Democratic	Jan 3, 2009 – present	Re-elected in 2014.	39	115th	39	Elected in 2016.	Jan 3, 2017 – present	Democratic	Maggie Hassan (Newfields)	37
32	Jeanne Shaheen (Madbury)	Democratic	Jan 3, 2009 – present	Re-elected in 2014.	39	116th	39	Elected in 2016.	Jan 3, 2017 – present	Democratic	Maggie Hassan (Newfields)	37
32	Jeanne Shaheen (Madbury)	Democratic	Jan 3, 2009 – present	Re-elected in 2020. Retiring at the end of term.	40	117th	39	Elected in 2016.	Jan 3, 2017 – present	Democratic	Maggie Hassan (Newfields)	37
32	Jeanne Shaheen (Madbury)	Democratic	Jan 3, 2009 – present	Re-elected in 2020. Retiring at the end of term.	40	118th	40	Re-elected in 2022.	Jan 3, 2017 – present	Democratic	Maggie Hassan (Newfields)	37
32	Jeanne Shaheen (Madbury)	Democratic	Jan 3, 2009 – present	Re-elected in 2020. Retiring at the end of term.	40	119th	40	Re-elected in 2022.	Jan 3, 2017 – present	Democratic	Maggie Hassan (Newfields)	37
33	Chris Pappas (elect) (Manchester)	Democratic	Taking office Jan 3, 2027	Elected in 2026.	41	120th	40	Re-elected in 2022.	Jan 3, 2017 – present	Democratic	Maggie Hassan (Newfields)	37
33	Chris Pappas (elect) (Manchester)	Democratic	Taking office Jan 3, 2027	Elected in 2026.	41	121st	41	To be determined in the 2028 election.				

== See also ==
- Elections in New Hampshire
- List of United States representatives from New Hampshire
- New Hampshire's congressional delegations
