= 1920 United States Senate election in New Hampshire =

- November 2, 1920
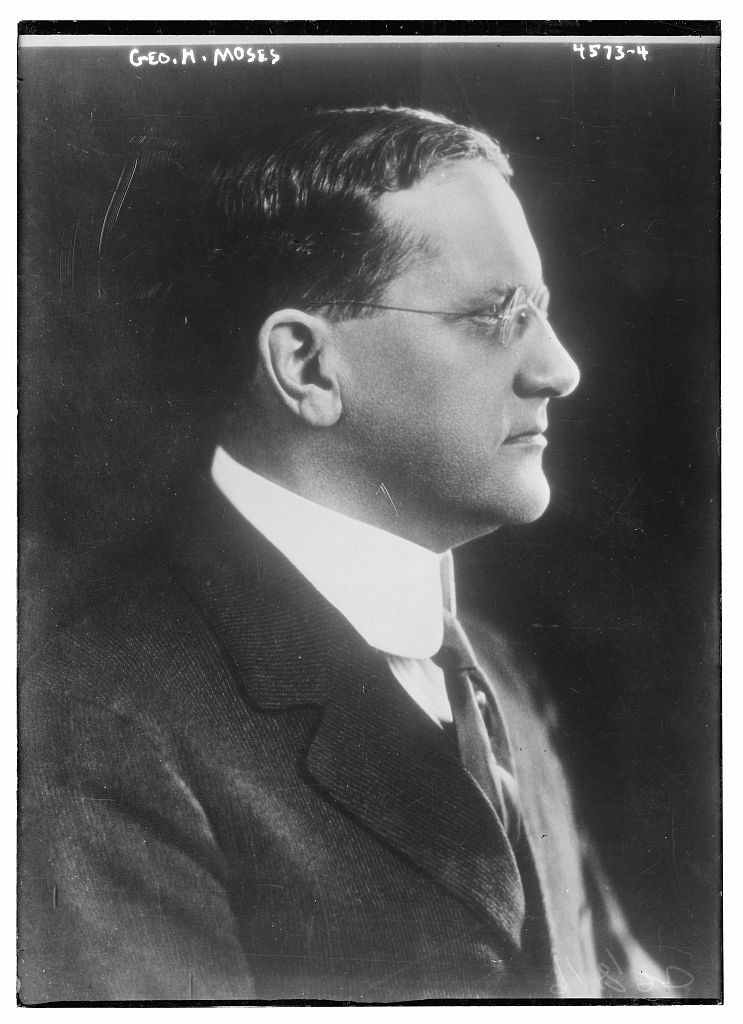

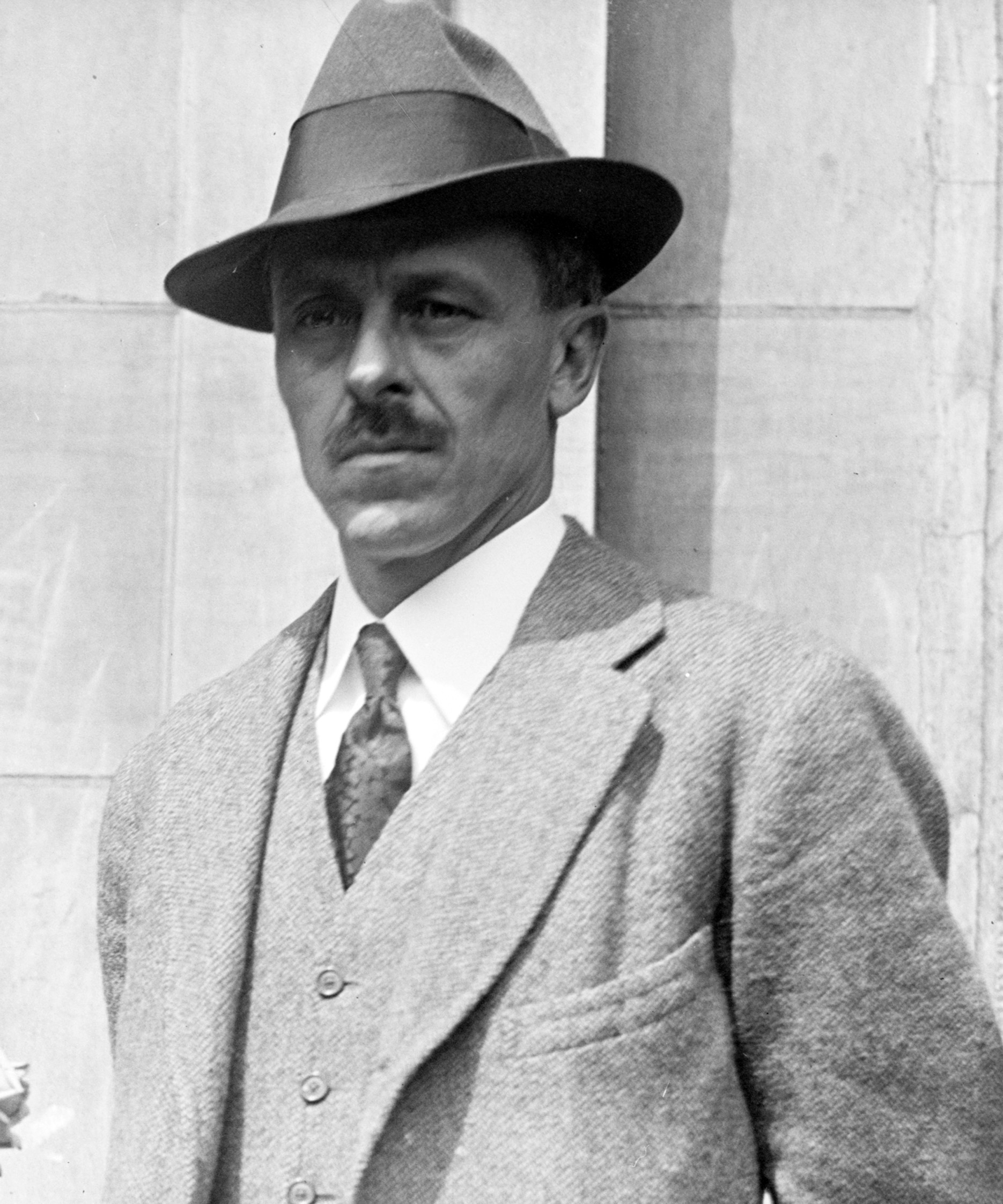
Nominee	George H. Moses	Raymond Bartlett Stevens
Party	Republican	Democratic
Popular vote	90,173	65,035
Percentage	57.72%	41.63%
- Moses: 50–60% 60–70% 70–80% 80–90% >90% Stevens: 50–60% 60–70% Tie: 40–50% 50%
U.S. senator before election
George H. Moses
Republican
Elected U.S. Senator
George H. Moses
Republican

The 1920 United States Senate election in New Hampshire took place on November 2, 1920. Incumbent Republican Senator George H. Moses, who was first elected in a 1918 special election, ran for re-election to his second term, and first full term in the Senate. In the general election, he faced former Democratic Congressman Raymond B. Stevens. The national political environment strongly favored Republicans, and Republican presidential nominee Warren G. Harding easily won the state in the presidential election, and Moses defeated Stevens in a landslide to win re-election.

== Democratic primary ==
=== Candidates ===
- Raymond B. Stevens, former U.S. Representative from New Hampshire's 2nd congressional district
- Albert W. Noone, former Executive Councilor, 1914 Democratic nominee for Governor

=== Results ===
Democratic primary results
Party	Candidate	Votes	%
Democratic	Raymond B. Stevens	7,097	76.24%
Democratic	Albert W. Noone	2,212	23.76%
Total votes		9,309	100.00%

== Republican primary ==
=== Candidates ===
- George H. Moses, incumbent U.S. Senator
- Huntley N. Spaulding, former Federal Food Administrator for New Hampshire

=== Results ===
Republican primary results
Party	Candidate	Votes	%
Republican	George H. Moses (inc.)	34,256	64.34%
Republican	Huntley N. Spaulding	18,984	35.66%
Total votes		53,240	100.00%

== General election ==
=== Results ===
1920 United States Senate election in New Hampshire
Party	Candidate	Votes	%	±%
Republican	George H. Moses (inc.)	90,173	57.72%	+6.96%
Democratic	Raymond B. Stevens	65,035	41.63%	−7.60%
Socialist	William H. Wilkins	1,004	0.64%	—
Majority		25,138	16.09%	+14.56%
Total votes		156,212	100.00%	
Republican hold				
