= Raymond B. Stevens =

American politician

Raymond Bartlett Stevens
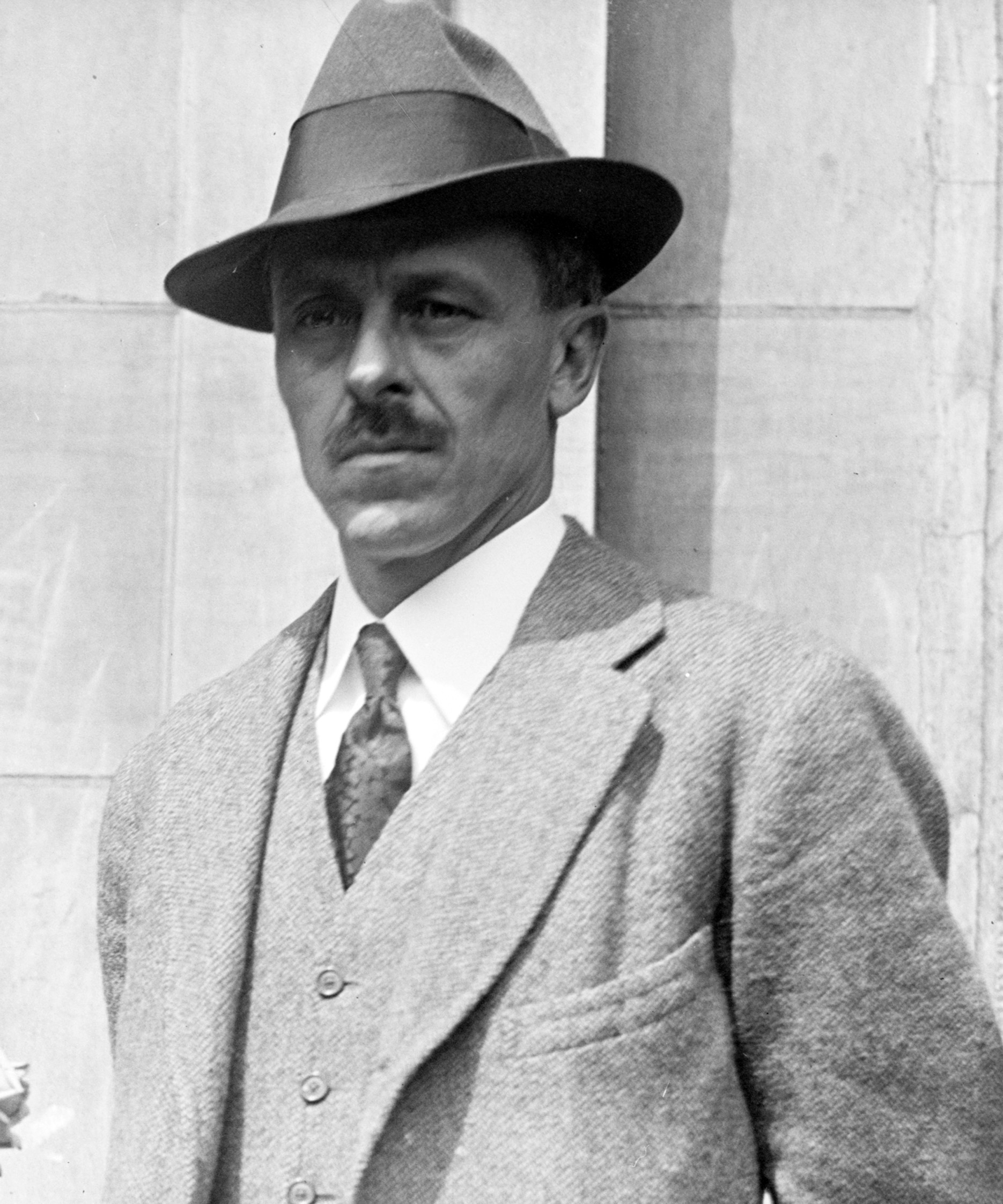

Member of the U.S. House of Representatives from New Hampshire's 2nd district
- In office March 4, 1913 – March 3, 1915
- Preceded by: Frank Dunklee Currier
- Succeeded by: Edward Hills Wason

Member of the New Hampshire House of Representatives
- In office 1909; 1911; 1913; 1923

Personal details
- Born: June 18, 1874 Binghamton, New York
- Died: May 18, 1942 (aged 67) Indianapolis, Indiana
- Party: Democratic
- Education: Boston Latin School, Harvard College, Harvard Law School

Raymond Bartlett Stevens (June 18, 1874 – May 18, 1942) was a U.S. representative from New Hampshire.

Born in Binghamton, New York, Stevens moved with his parents to Lisbon, New Hampshire, in 1876. He attended the public schools, Boston Latin School, Harvard University, and Harvard Law School. He was admitted to the bar in 1899 and commenced practice in Lisbon. He served as member of the New Hampshire House of Representatives in 1909, 1911, 1913, and 1923. He served as member of the State constitutional convention in 1912.

Stevens was elected as a Democrat to the Sixty-third Congress (March 4, 1913 – March 3, 1915). He was not a candidate for renomination in 1914, but was instead an unsuccessful candidate for the United States Senate. He served as special counsel of the Federal Trade Commission, 1915–1917, and was United States representative to the Allied Maritime Transport Council in 1917 and 1918. He served as vice chairman of the United States Shipping Board, 1917-1920.

Stevens served as delegate to the Democratic National Conventions in 1920 and 1924. He was appointed adviser in foreign affairs to the King of Siam in January 1926, in which capacity he served until 1935, except for a six-month period during 1933 when he was a member of the Federal Trade Commission. He was a member of the Federal Tariff Commission, 1935–1942, serving as chairman, 1937-1942. He died in Indianapolis, Indiana, May 18, 1942, and was interred on the grounds of the family residence at Landaff, New Hampshire.

Party political offices
First	Democratic nominee for U.S. Senator from New Hampshire (Class 3); 1914	Succeeded by John B. Jameson
Preceded by John B. Jameson	Democratic nominee for U.S. Senator from New Hampshire (Class 3); 1920	Succeeded by Robert C. Murchie
U.S. House of Representatives
Preceded by Frank Dunklee Currier	Member of the U.S. House of Representatives from New Hampshire's 2nd congressional district March 4, 1913 – March 3, 1915	Succeeded by Edward Hills Wason
