= 1918 United States Senate special election in New Hampshire =

Election in a U.S state

- November 5, 1918
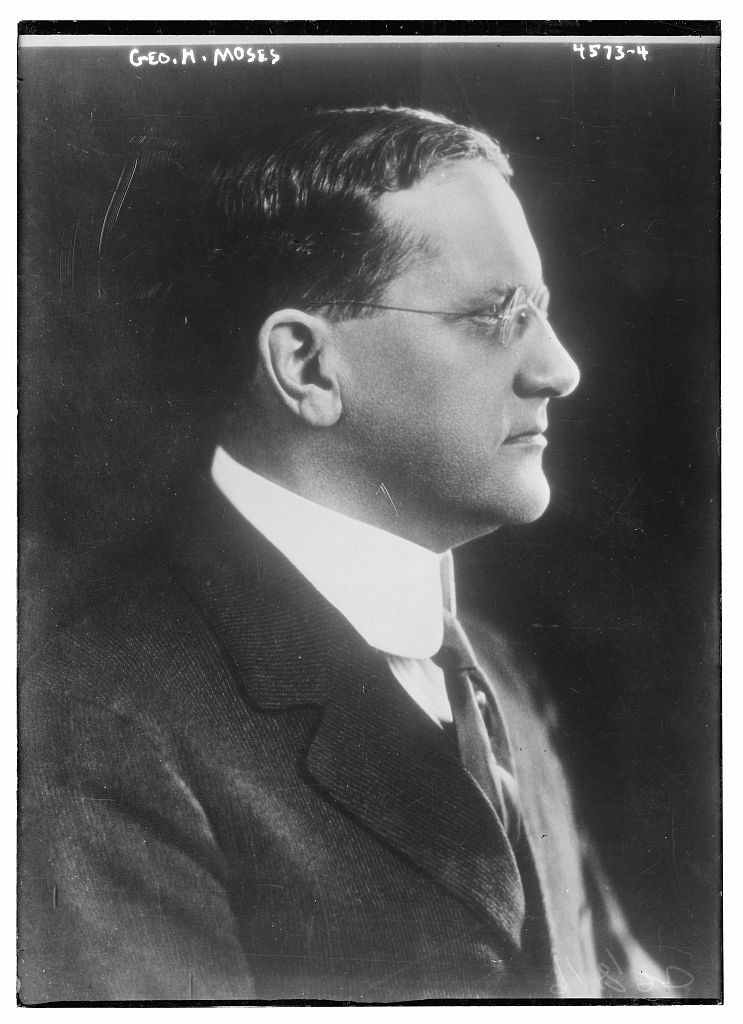

Nominee	George H. Moses	John B. Jameson
Party	Republican	Democratic
Popular vote	35,528	34,458
Percentage	50.76%	49.23%
- Moses: 50–60% 60–70% 70–80% 80–90% >90% Jameson: 50–60% 60–70% 70–80% Tie: 50%
U.S. senator before election
Irving W. Drew
Republican
Elected U.S. senator
George H. Moses
Republican

The 1918 United States Senate special election was held on November 5, 1918, following the death of Republican U.S. Senator Jacob H. Gallinger on August 17, 1918. Following Gallinger's death, Governor Henry W. Keyes appointed Irving W. Drew, a former State Senator and businessman, to serve until the special election. Because Gallinger's death took place too close to the September 3 primary, the Democratic and Republican parties named their nominations through conventions in late September.

George H. Moses, the former U.S. Minister to Greece, won the nomination of the state Republican Party over former Governor Rolland H. Spaulding, and faced Democratic nominee John B. Jameson, the Chairman of the New Hampshire Committee of Public Safety, in the general election. Moses only narrowly defeated Jameson, winning the election by less than 2 percent of the vote and by a 1,070 vote margin.

== Republican nomination ==
Prior to Senator Gallinger's death, four prominent Republican candidates—former Governors Rolland Spaulding and Henry W. Keyes, former U.S. Minister to Greece George H. Moses, and publisher Rosecrans W. Pillsbury—were running for the U.S. Senate seat held by Democrat Henry F. Hollis, which was up in 1918. However, after Gallinger's death, Moses withdrew from the primary and turned his attention toward winning the nomination of the Republican convention. After Spaulding lost the primary for the regular election, he did not actively campaign for the nomination at the convention, but announced that he would accept the nomination if it were offered.

On September 27, the state Republican Party convened in Concord, New Hampshire, to select their nominee for the special election. Moses won the nomination on the first ballot, receiving 450 votes to Spaulding's 201 and 1 cast for Senator Drew. After Moses won the nomination, a supporter of Spaulding's moved to have the nomination made unanimous, which the convention agreed to.

== Democratic nomination ==
On September 30, 1918, the New Hampshire Democratic Party held its convention in Concord to select its nominee for the special election. The convention delegates unanimously voted to select John B. Jameson, the Chairman of the state Committee on Public Safety, as their nominee.

== General election ==
=== Results ===
1918 United States Senate special election in New Hampshire
Party	Candidate	Votes	%	±%
Republican	George H. Moses	35,528	50.76%	−0.89%
Democratic	John B. Jameson	34,458	49.23%	+4.61%
Write-in		6	0.01%	—
Majority		1,070	1.53%	−5.50%
Total votes		69,992	100.00%	
Republican hold				
