= 1932 United States Senate election in New Hampshire =

- November 8, 1932
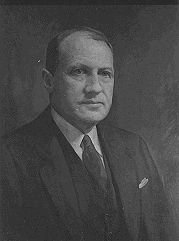

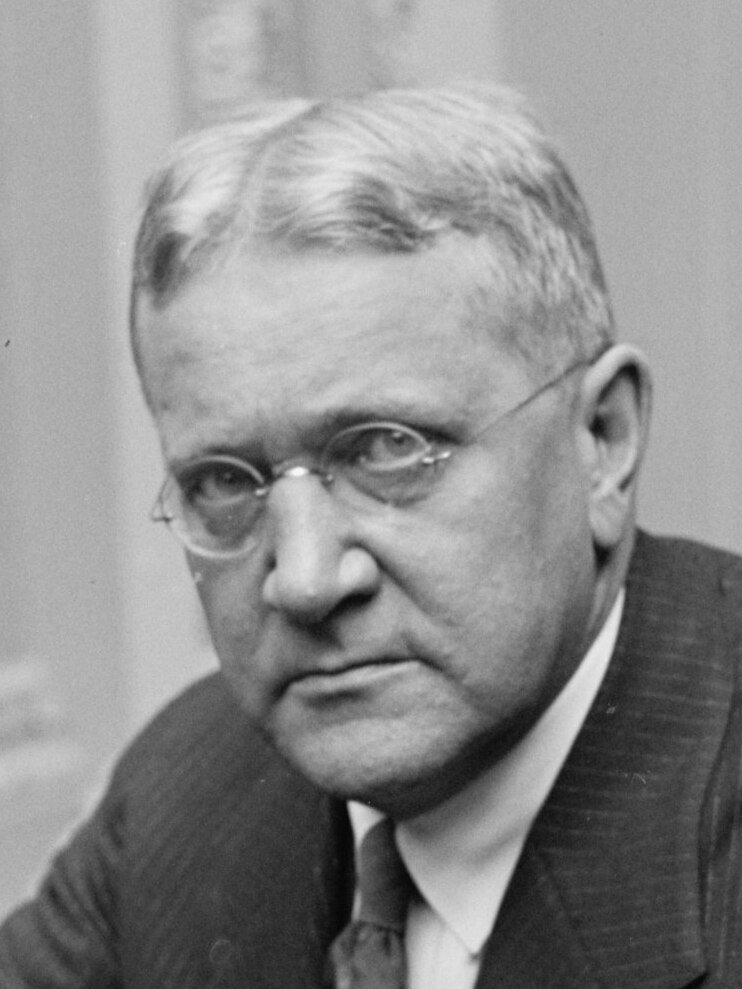
Nominee	Fred H. Brown	George H. Moses
Party	Democratic	Republican
Popular vote	98,766	96,649
Percentage	50.35%	49.27%
- Brown: 50–60% 60–70% 70–80% 80–90% 90-100% Moses: 50–60% 60–70% 70–80% 80–90% Tie: 40-50% 50%
Senator before election
George H. Moses
Republican
Elected Senator
Fred H. Brown
Democratic

The 1932 United States Senate election in New Hampshire took place on November 8, 1932. Incumbent Republican Senator George H. Moses ran for re-election to a third full term but was defeated by Democratic former governor Fred H. Brown. Although the state voted for incumbent Republicans Herbert Hoover and John G. Winant in the concurrent presidential election and gubernatorial election, respectively, Moses ran significantly behind the top of the ticket and was narrowly defeated by Brown. The result was attributed to Brown's personal popularity and Moses's age.

== Background ==
Incumbent Senator George H. Moses was first elected in 1918 to fill the unexpired term of Jacob H. Gallinger and re-elected in 1920 and 1926. Entering 1932, he pledged to retire at the expiration of the next term and referred to this race as his "sunset campaign."

As a Senator, Moses was noted for biting remarks which had alienated the progressive wing of his own party, whom he referred to in a Senate speech as "sons of the wild jackass." By contrast, Brown had a strong public profile as a former player for the Boston Braves and governor from 1923 to 1925. He had been put forward as a candidate for the presidential nomination at the 1924 Democratic National Convention. In January 1932, Democratic Party supporters from Strafford County began recruiting Brown to oppose Moses. He defeated two lesser candidates for the Democratic nomination in September.

== Republican primary ==
=== Candidates ===
- George H. Moses, incumbent U.S. Senator since 1918

=== Results ===
1932 Republican U.S. Senate primary
Party	Candidate	Votes	%
Republican	George H. Moses (incumbent)	45,443	100.00%
Total votes		45,443	100.00%
	Blank ballots	16,257	26.35%
Turnout		61,700	100.00%

== Democratic primary ==
=== Candidates ===
- Fred H. Brown, former Governor of New Hampshire
- Joseph A. Coutremarsh, Lebanon dentist
- Timothy F. O'Connor, Manchester attorney

=== Results ===
1932 Democratic U.S. Senate primary
Party	Candidate	Votes	%
Democratic	Fred H. Brown	14,598	57.13%
Democratic	Timothy F. O'Connor	8,239	32.24%
Democratic	Joseph A. Coutremarsh	2,715	10.63%
Total votes		25,552	100.00%
	Blank ballots	4,701	15.54%
Turnout		30,253	100.00%

== General election ==
=== Candidates ===
- Fred H. Brown, former Governor of New Hampshire (Democratic)
- Fred B. Chase (Independent)
- Charles W. Greene (Independent)
- George H. Moses, incumbent U.S. Senator since 1918 (Republican)

=== Results ===
The Manchester Union, which supported Moses, conceded his defeat on November 9. Brown's largest margin came from his home town of Somersworth, which he had won by a margin of roughly 1,900 votes and had presided over for a decade as mayor.

1932 U.S. Senate election in New Hampshire
Party	Candidate	Votes	%	±%
Democratic	Fred H. Brown	98,766	50.35%	▲12.67
Republican	George H. Moses (incumbent)	96,649	49.27%	▼13.05
Independent	Charles W. Greene	533	0.27%	N/A
Independent	Fred B. Chase	228	0.12%	N/A
Total votes		196,176	100.00%	
Democratic gain from Republican		Swing		
