= George H. Moses =

American politician (1869–1944)

George Higgins Moses
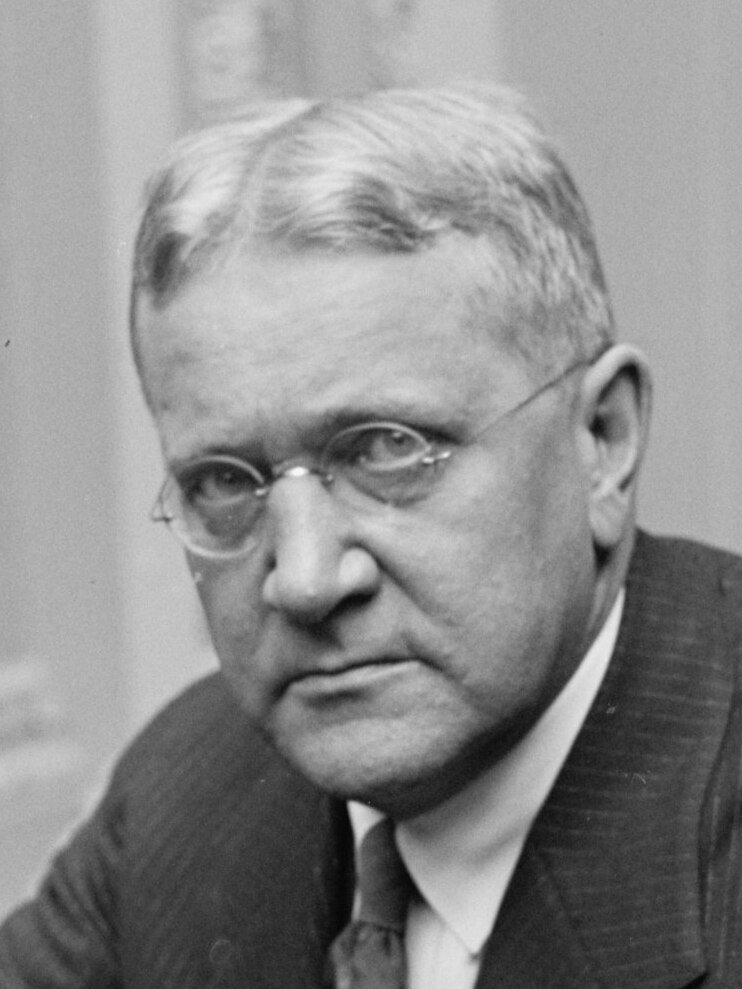
- Moses in 1929

United States Senator from New Hampshire
- In office November 6, 1918 – March 3, 1933
- Preceded by: Irving W. Drew
- Succeeded by: Fred H. Brown

President pro tempore of the United States Senate
- In office March 6, 1925 – March 3, 1933
- Preceded by: Albert B. Cummins
- Succeeded by: Key Pittman

3rd United States Minister to Montenegro
- In office May 31, 1910 – September 30, 1912
- President: William Howard Taft
- Preceded by: Richmond Pearson
- Succeeded by: Jacob Gould Schurman

United States Minister to Greece
- In office July 5, 1909 – September 30, 1912
- President: William Howard Taft
- Preceded by: Richmond Pearson
- Succeeded by: Jacob Gould Schurman

Personal details
- Born: February 9, 1869 Lubec, Maine
- Died: December 20, 1944 (aged 75) Concord, New Hampshire
- Party: Republican
- Education: Dartmouth College (B.A., M.A.)
- Profession: Newspaper editor, diplomat

George Higgins Moses (February 9, 1869 – December 20, 1944) was a U.S. diplomat and political figure. He served as a United States senator from New Hampshire and was chosen as the Senate's president pro tempore.

== Biography ==
George H. Moses was born in Lubec, Maine on February 9, 1869. He was raised in Eastport, Maine, and Franklin, New Hampshire, and graduated from Phillips Exeter Academy in 1887. He graduated from Dartmouth College in 1890, and was a member of the Psi Upsilon fraternity. In 1893 he received a Master of Arts degree from Dartmouth.

After graduating, though he considered a job teaching Latin and Greek, he instead joined the Concord Monitor, and became a newspaper editor.

He was private secretary to Governor David H. Goodell from 1889 to 1891. Moses then went into journalism, working as a reporter, news editor, and chief editor for the Concord Evening Monitor from 1892 to 1918. Moses was a member of the New Hampshire Forestry Commission from 1893 to 1907, and served as the commission's secretary. Moses was a delegate to the 1908 Republican National Convention.

In 1909 Moses was appointed by President William Howard Taft to be the United States Minister to Greece and Montenegro, and he served until 1912. The appointment was a surprise to Moses, who had opposed Taft's nomination for President at the 1908 convention. Moses was also a delegate to the 1916 Republican National Convention.

== United States Senator ==
In 1918 Moses was elected to the United States Senate from New Hampshire to complete the term of Jacob H. Gallinger. He was handily reelected to full terms in 1920 and 1926. He was Senate president pro tempore from 1925 to 1933. During his Senate service Moses was chairman of the Committee on Printing (Sixty-sixth through Sixty-eighth Congresses); the Committee on Post Office and Post Roads (Sixty-ninth and Seventieth Congresses); and the Committee on Rules (Seventy-first and Seventy-second Congresses).

Moses ran unsuccessfully for reelection in 1932, losing narrowly to Democrat Fred H. Brown, a former governor, in the Democratic landslide that also saw Franklin D. Roosevelt defeat Herbert Hoover in that year's presidential election. Moses was later a delegate to the 1936 Republican National Convention.

== Later life ==
Moses died in Concord, New Hampshire on December 20, 1944. He was buried at Franklin Cemetery in Franklin, New Hampshire.

Party political offices
Preceded by Jacob Harold Gallinger	Republican nominee for U.S. Senator from New Hampshire (Class 3); 1918, 1920, 1926, 1932	Succeeded by Charles W. Tobey
Diplomatic posts
Preceded by Richmond Pearson	United States Minister to Greece; 1910–1912	Succeeded by Jacob Gould Schurman
Preceded by Richmond Pearson	United States Minister to Montenegro; 1910–1912	Succeeded by Jacob Gould Schurman
U.S. Senate
Preceded by Irving W. Drew	U.S. senator (Class 3) from New Hampshire; November 6, 1918 – March 3, 1933; Served alongside: Henry F. Hollis, Henry W. Keyes	Succeeded by Fred H. Brown
Political offices
Preceded by Albert B. Cummins	President pro tempore of the United States Senate; March 6, 1925 – March 3, 1933	Succeeded by Key Pittman
