= 1914 United States Senate election in New Hampshire =

- November 3, 1914
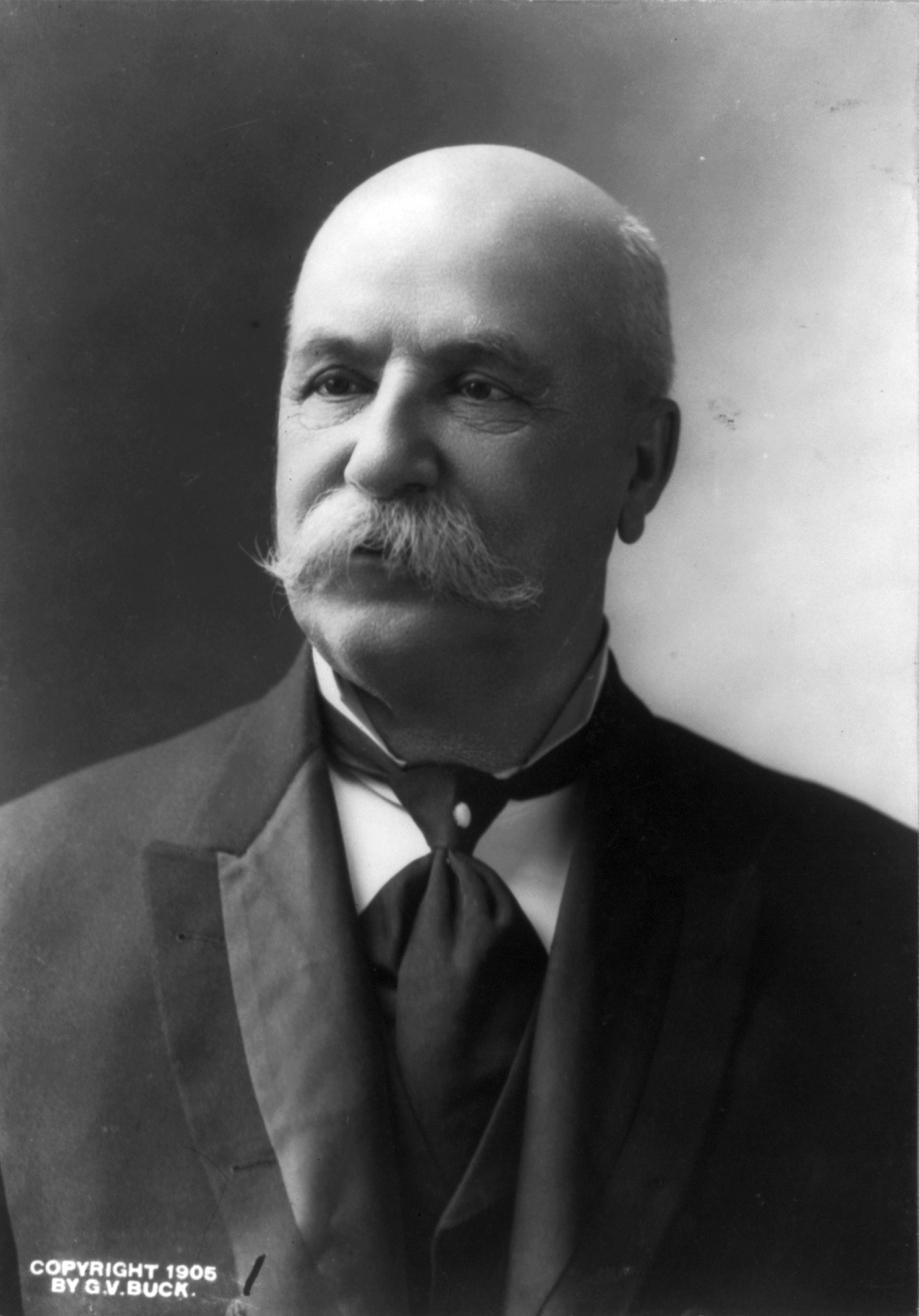

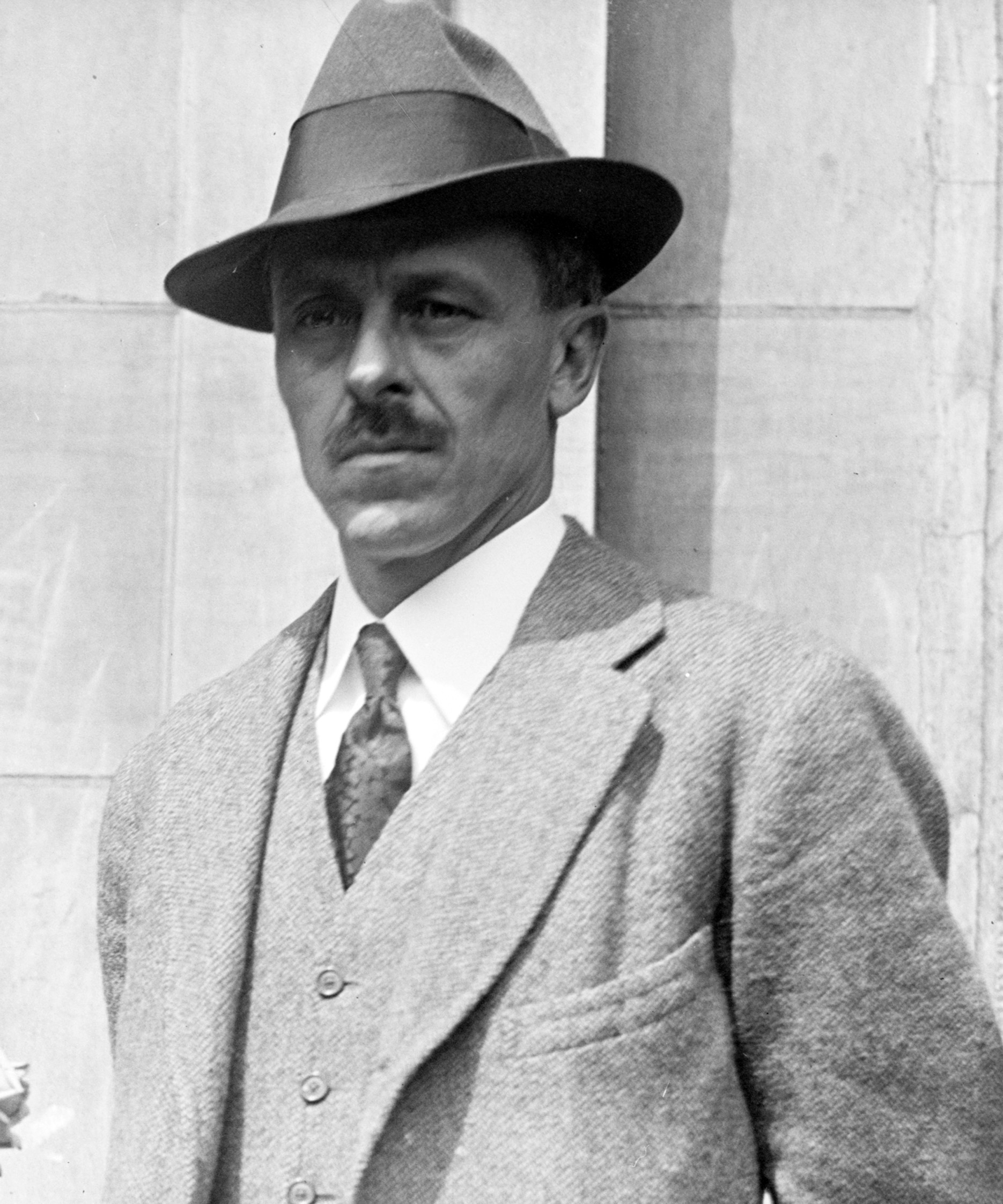
Nominee	Jacob H. Gallinger	Raymond B. Stevens
Party	Republican	Democratic
Popular vote	42,113	36,382
Percentage	51.65%	44.63%
- Gallinger: 40–50% 50–60% 60–70% 70–80% 80–90% >90% Stevens: 40–50% 50–60% 60–70% 70–80% Tie: 40–50% 50%
U.S. senator before election
Jacob H. Gallinger
Republican
Elected U.S. senator
Jacob H. Gallinger
Republican

The 1914 United States Senate election in New Hampshire took place on November 3, 1914, and was the first direct election for the U.S. Senate that took place in New Hampshire. Incumbent U.S. Senator Jacob H. Gallinger ran for re-election to a fifth term. He defeated U.S. Representative Raymond B. Stevens by a 7 percent margin, winning re-election. Gallinger did not end up serving his full term; he died on August 17, 1918.

== Democratic primary ==
=== Candidates ===
- Raymond B. Stevens, U.S. Representative from New Hampshire's 2nd congressional district
- Calvin Page, former State Senator
- William H. Barry, Mayor of Nashua

=== Results ===
Democratic primary results
Party	Candidate	Votes	%
Democratic	Raymond B. Stevens	4,919	46.94%
Democratic	Calvin Page	2,996	28.59%
Democratic	William H. Barry	2,564	24.47%
Total votes		10,479	100.00%

== Republican primary ==
=== Candidates ===
- Jacob H. Gallinger, incumbent U.S. Senator

=== Results ===
Republican primary results
Party	Candidate	Votes	%
Republican	Jacob H. Gallinger (inc.)	17,796	100.00%
Total votes		17,796	100.00%

== Progressive primary ==
=== Candidates ===
- Benjamin F. Greer, former Executive Councilor

=== Results ===
Progressive primary results
Party	Candidate	Votes	%
Progressive	Benjamin F. Greer	744	100.00%
Total votes		744	100.00%

== General election ==
=== Results ===
1914 United States Senate election in New Hampshire
Party	Candidate	Votes	%
Republican	Jacob H. Gallinger (inc.)	42,113	51.65%
Democratic	Raymond B. Stevens	36,382	44.63%
Progressive	Benjamin F. Greer	1,938	2.38%
Socialist	William H. Wilkins	1,089	1.34%
Write-in		6	0.01%
Total votes		81,528	100.00%
Republican hold			
