= Edward Hills Wason =

American politician (1865–1941)

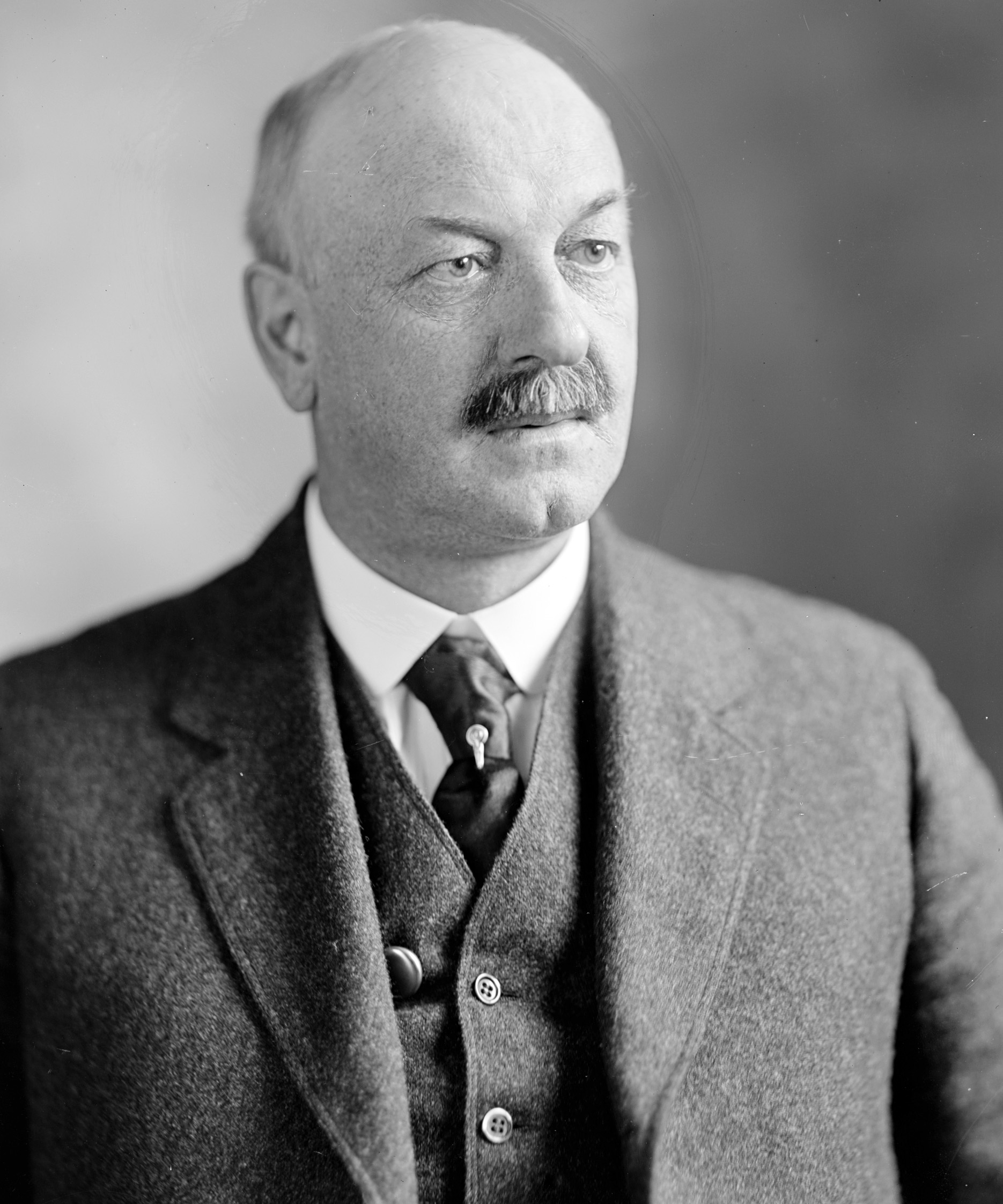

Member of the U.S. House of Representatives from New Hampshire's 2nd district
- In office March 4, 1915 – March 3, 1933
- Preceded by: Raymond Bartlett Stevens
- Succeeded by: Charles W. Tobey

Member of the New Hampshire House of Representatives
- In office 1913–1913
- In office 1909–1909
- In office 1899–1899

Member of the Nashua, New Hampshire Board of Aldermen
- In office 1906–1908

Solicitor of Hillsborough County
- In office 1903–1907

President of the Nashua, New Hampshire Common Council
- In office 1897–1898

Member of the Nashua, New Hampshire Common Council
- In office 1897–1898

Personal details
- Born: September 2, 1865 New Boston, New Hampshire
- Died: February 6, 1941 (aged 75) New Boston, New Hampshire
- Party: Republican
- Education: New Hampshire College of Agriculture and the Mechanic Arts, 1886; Boston University School of Law, 1890

Edward Hills Wason (September 2, 1865 – February 6, 1941) was a U.S. representative from New Hampshire.

== Biography ==
Born in New Boston, New Hampshire, Wason attended public and private schools and Francestown Academy. He was graduated from the New Hampshire College of Agriculture and the Mechanic Arts at Hanover in 1886 and from Boston University School of Law in 1890. He was admitted to the bar in 1890 and commenced practice in Nashua, New Hampshire.

Wason was sergeant at arms, assistant clerk, and later clerk of the New Hampshire Senate. He served as member of the Nashua Board of Education, 1891–1895, serving as its president in 1895. He was city solicitor of Nashua in 1894 and 1895, and served as president of the common council in 1897 and 1898. He was an alderman of Nashua, 1906–1908.

He served in the New Hampshire House of Representatives in 1899, 1909, and 1913, and as member of the state constitutional conventions in 1902 and 1912. He served as solicitor of Hillsborough County, 1903–1907. He served as president of the Citizens' Guaranty Savings Bank of Nashua, 1904–1941, and he also engaged in agricultural pursuits in Merrimack from 1906 to 1941.

Wason was elected as a Republican to the 64th United States Congress and to the eight succeeding Congresses (March 4, 1915 – March 3, 1933). He was not a candidate for renomination in 1932. He retired from public life in 1933 and resided on his estate near New Boston, where he died February 6, 1941. He was interred in New Boston Cemetery.

U.S. House of Representatives
| Preceded by Raymond Bartlett Stevens | Member of the U.S. House of Representatives from New Hampshire's 2nd congressional district March 4, 1915 – March 3, 1933 | Succeeded by Charles W. Tobey |
Business positions
| Preceded by | President of the Citizens' Guaranty Savings Bank of Nashua; 1904–1941 | Succeeded by |
