= Warren F. Daniell =

American politician

Hon. Warren Fisher Daniell
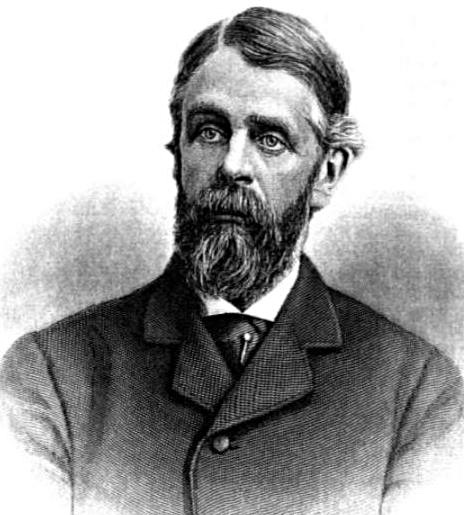

Member of the U.S. House of Representatives from New Hampshire's 2nd district
- In office March 4, 1891 – March 3, 1893
- Preceded by: Orren C. Moore
- Succeeded by: Henry Moore Baker

Member of the New Hampshire Senate
- In office 1873-1874

Member of the New Hampshire House of Representatives
- In office 1861; 1862; 1870-1877

Personal details
- Born: June 26, 1826 Newton Lower Falls; Massachusetts, USA
- Died: July 30, 1913 (aged 87) Franklin, Merrimack County; New Hampshire, USA
- Resting place: Franklin Cemetery, Franklin; Merrimack County, New Hampshire
- Party: Democratic
- Spouse(s): Elizabeth D. Rundlett Daniell; Abbie Ann Sanger Daniell
- Children: Harry W. Daniell; Eugene S. Daniell, Sr. Otis Daniell; Warren Fisher Daniell, Jr. Jere R. Daniell
- Profession: Manufacturer; Farmer; Stock Breeder; Banker; Politician

Warren Fisher Daniell (June 26, 1826 – July 30, 1913) was an American politician and a U.S. Representative from New Hampshire. He was also a manufacturer, stock breeder, and banker.

== Early life ==
Born in Newton Lower Falls, Massachusetts, Daniell attended the common schools, and moved with his parents to Franklin, New Hampshire, in 1834. He proceeded with his studies until fourteen years of age, when he entered his father's paper mill as an apprentice.

== Career ==
Daniell constructed a paper mill at Waterville, Maine, in 1852, and in the following year, managed a similar mill in Pepperell, Massachusetts. He returned to Franklin, New Hampshire, in 1854 and while engaged in the manufacture of paper, he also engaged in agricultural pursuits and the breeding of blooded stock on a large model farm within Franklin's city limits. He was director of the Franklin National Bank and trustee of the Franklin Savings Bank.

Daniell served as member of the New Hampshire House of Representatives in 1861, 1862, and 1870-1877. He served as delegate to the Democratic National Convention in 1872, and in the New Hampshire Senate in 1873 and 1874.

Elected as a Democrat to the Fifty-second Congress, Daniell served as United States Representative for the second district of New Hampshire from (March 4, 1891 – March 3, 1893). He was not a candidate for renomination in 1892. He continued his activities in the manufacture of paper at Franklin, New Hampshire, until 1898, being interested in the Winnepesogee Paper Co.

== Death ==
Daniell died in Franklin, July 30, 1913, and is interred at Franklin Cemetery, Franklin, Merrimack County, New Hampshire.

== Family life ==
Son of Jeremiah Fisher and Sarah Daniell, he married Elizabeth D. Rundlett on December 31, 1850, and they had a son, Harry W. Elizabeth died in 1853, and on October 19, 1860, he married Abbie Ann Sanger and they had four sons, Eugene S., Otis, Warren F., and Jere R.

U.S. House of Representatives
Preceded by Orren C. Moore	Member of the U.S. House of Representatives from New Hampshire's 2nd congressional district March 4, 1891 – March 3, 1893	Succeeded by Henry Moore Baker
