= Orren C. Moore =

American politician (1839–1893)

Hon. Orren Cheney Moore
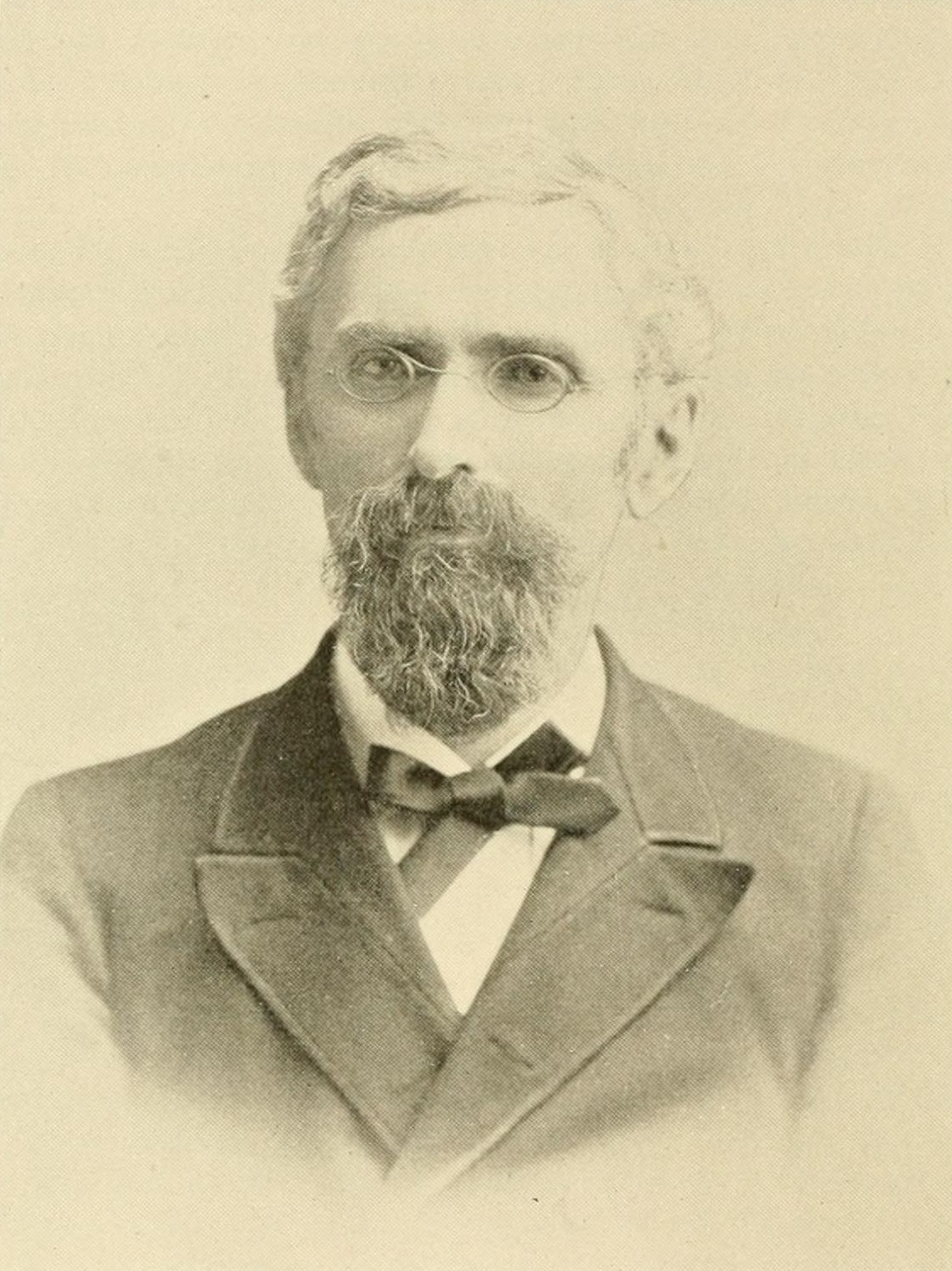

Member of the U.S. House of Representatives from New Hampshire's 2nd district
- In office March 4, 1889 – March 3, 1891
- Preceded by: Jacob H. Gallinger
- Succeeded by: Warren F. Daniell

Member of the New Hampshire Senate
- In office 1879–1881

Member of the New Hampshire House of Representatives
- In office 1878–1878

Member of the New Hampshire House of Representatives
- In office 1875–1876

Member of the New Hampshire House of Representatives
- In office 1863–1864

Personal details
- Born: August 10, 1839 New Hampton, New Hampshire, US
- Died: May 12, 1893 (aged 53) Nashua, New Hampshire, US
- Party: Republican

Orren Cheney Moore (August 10, 1839 – May 12, 1893) was a U.S. Representative from New Hampshire.

Born in New Hampton, New Hampshire, Moore attended the public schools, learned the trade of printer and became a journalist. He served as member of the New Hampshire House of Representatives in 1863, 1864, 1875, 1876, and 1878. He established the Nashua Daily Telegraph in 1869. He served as member of the State tax commission in 1878 and served in the New Hampshire Senate, 1879-1881. He was again a member of the State house of representatives in 1887, and he served as chairman of the state railroad commission, 1884-1888.

Moore was elected as a Republican to the Fifty-first Congress (March 4, 1889 – March 3, 1891). He was an unsuccessful candidate for reelection in 1890 to the Fifty-second Congress. He resumed his former pursuits as editor and publisher, and died in Nashua, on May 12, 1893. He was interred in the Woodlawn Cemetery.

U.S. House of Representatives
Preceded by Jacob H. Gallinger	Member of the U.S. House of Representatives from New Hampshire's 2nd congressional district March 4, 1889 – March 3, 1891	Succeeded by Warren F. Daniell
