= Henry M. Baker =

American lawyer and politician

Henry Moore Baker
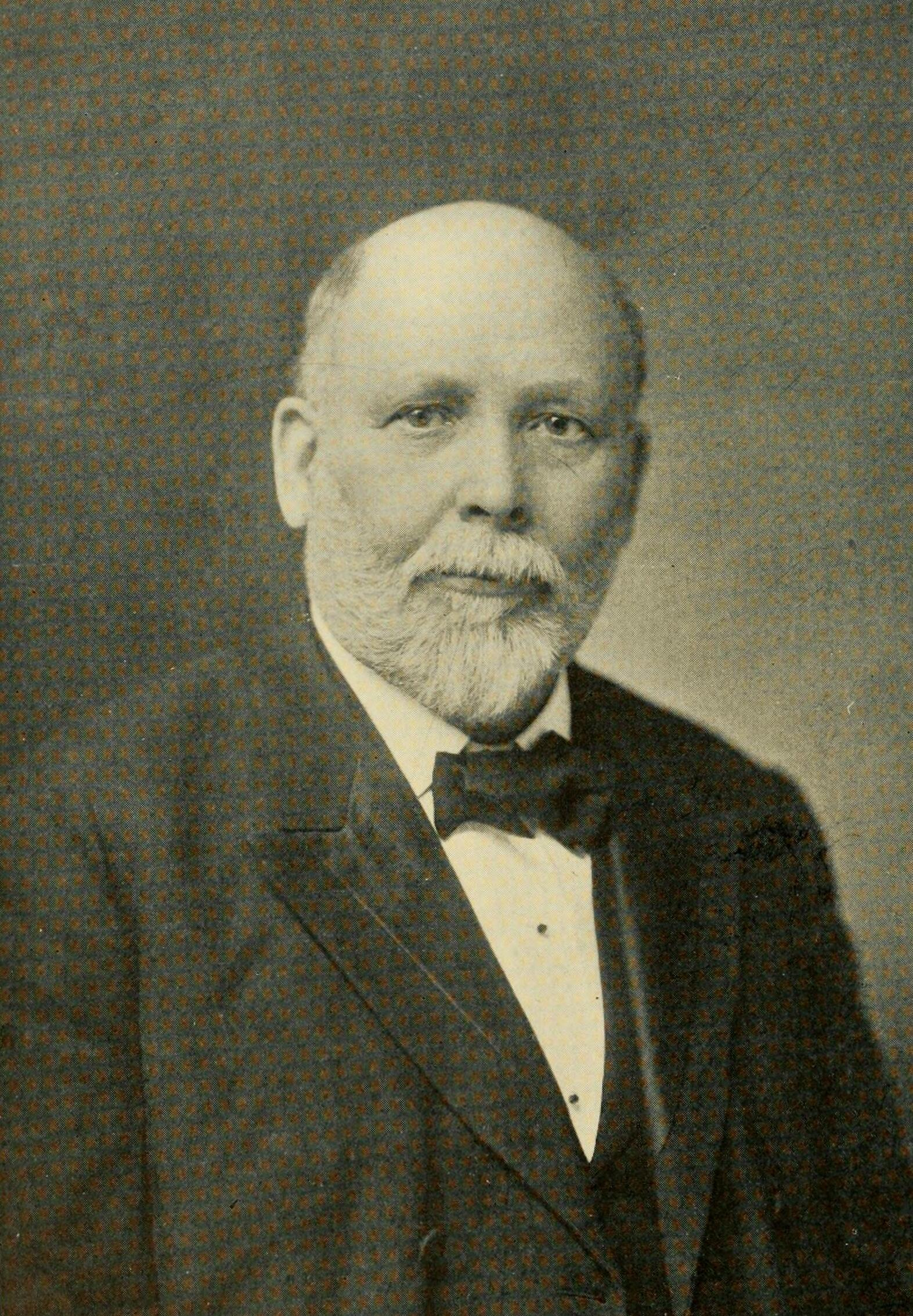
- Baker in 1912

Member of the New Hampshire House of Representatives
- In office 1905–1909

Member of the U.S. House of Representatives from New Hampshire's 2nd district
- In office March 4, 1893 – March 3, 1897
- Preceded by: Warren F. Daniell
- Succeeded by: Frank Gay Clarke

Member of the New Hampshire Senate from the 9th District
- In office 1891–1892
- Preceded by: John C. Pearson
- Succeeded by: George C. Preston

Personal details
- Born: January 11, 1841 Bow, New Hampshire, U.S.
- Died: May 30, 1912 (aged 71) Washington, D.C., U.S.
- Resting place: Alexander Cemetery, Bow, New Hampshire, U.S.
- Party: Republican
- Relations: Mary Baker Eddy (cousin)
- Education: Dartmouth College, 1863; Columbian Law School) University, Washington, D.C., 1866.

Military service
- Branch/service: Judge Advocate General, New Hampshire National Guard
- Years of service: 1886 – 1887
- Rank: Brigadier General

Henry Moore Baker (January 11, 1841 – May 30, 1912) was an American lawyer and politician who served as a member of the New Hampshire House and Senate, and as a member of the United States House of Representatives representing New Hampshire.

== Early life ==
Henry Moore Baker was born in Bow, New Hampshire, near the capital city of Concord, on January 11, 1841; the son of Aaron Whittemore Baker, a descendant of Aaron Whittemore, the first settled minister in Pembroke, and Nancy Dustin Baker. He had three siblings, Rufus, Francis M., and John B. Baker. Baker attended state common schools as well as Pembroke, Tilton, and Hopkinton Academies. He graduated from the New Hampshire Conference Seminary in 1859, Dartmouth College in 1863, and the law school of Columbian (now George Washington) University, Washington, D.C., in 1866.

Baker is the cousin of Mary Baker Eddy, the founder of the Church of Christ, Scientist.

== Career ==
In 1866, Baker was admitted to the bar. From 1864 to 1874, he served as clerk in the War and Treasury Departments.

After leaving government service, Baker stayed in Washington, D.C., to practice law. From 1886 to 1887, he served as Judge Advocate General of the National Guard of New Hampshire with the rank of brigadier general.

Baker ran as the Republican candidate in the 9th District of the New Hampshire Senate during the 1890 United States elections, in which Republicans performed poorly nationwide, but won the election by three votes. The seat was traditionally a Democratic stronghold, and his win there in such an off-year for Republicans encouraged speculation that he would run for the United States Congress. From 1891 to 1892, Baker held the seat in the New Hampshire Senate until he was elected to be a Republican member of New Hampshire's delegation to the national House of Representatives representing New Hampshire's 2nd congressional district. He served in the Fifty-third and Fifty-fourth Congresses (March 3, 1893 – March 3, 1897).

After retiring from his Congressional seat, he once again practiced law in Washington, D.C., although he remained a legal resident of his hometown of Bow, New Hampshire. However, from 1905 to 1909, he was a member of the New Hampshire House of Representatives.

== Death ==
Shortly before his death, he donated $10,000 ($333,621 in 2025) and a plot of land next to his property in Bow for the creation of the towns public library, which was named after him and still stands to this day. He died at George Washington University Hospital in Washington, D.C. on May 30, 1912, and was buried in Alexander Cemetery in his hometown.

== Sources ==
- Bundy, David A. (1975). 100 acres more or less: The history of the land and people of Bow, New Hampshire. Phoenix Pub.
- United States Congress. "Henry M. Baker (id: B000061)". Biographical Directory of the United States Congress.

U.S. House of Representatives
Preceded by Warren F. Daniell	Member of the U.S. House of Representatives from New Hampshire's 2nd congressional district March 4, 1893 – March 3, 1897	Succeeded by Frank Gay Clarke
