= 1926 United States Senate election in New Hampshire =

- November 2, 1926
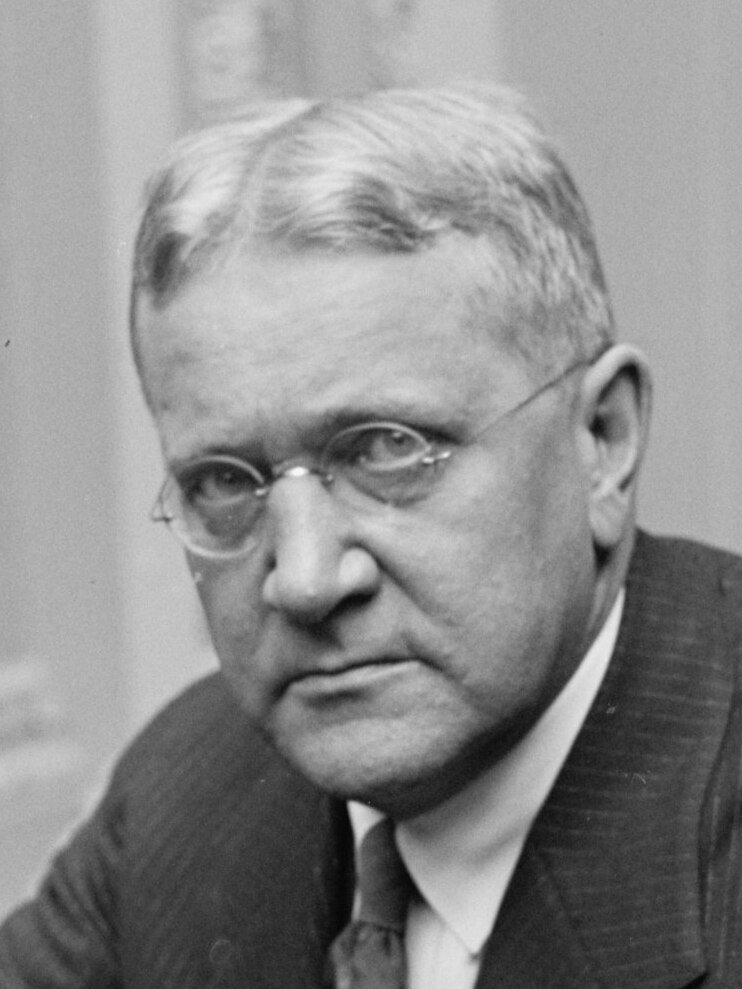

Nominee	George H. Moses	Robert C. Murchie
Party	Republican	Democratic
Popular vote	79,279	47,935
Percentage	62.3%	37.7%
- Moses: 50–60% 60–70% 70–80% 80–90% >90% Murchie: 50–60% 60–70% 70–80%
Senator before election
George H. Moses
Republican
Elected Senator
George H. Moses
Republican

The 1926 United States Senate election in New Hampshire took place on November 2, 1926. Incumbent Republican Senator George H. Moses was re-elected to a second full term in office over Democratic nominee Robert C. Murchie.

Primary elections were held on September 7. Moses defeated a challenge from former Governor of New Hampshire and progressive leader Robert P. Bass in the Republican primary, while Murchie defeated 1916 gubernatorial nominee Albert W. Noone in the Democratic primary.

== Republican primary ==
=== Candidates ===
- Robert P. Bass, former Governor of New Hampshire
- George H. Moses, incumbent U.S. Senator since 1918
- James G. Remick

=== Results ===
1926 Republican U.S. Senate primary
Party	Candidate	Votes	%
Republican	George H. Moses (incumbent)	37,655	66.70%
Republican	Robert P. Bass	17,654	31.27%
Republican	James G. Remick	1,147	2.03%
Total votes		56,456	100.00%
	Blank ballots	1,449	2.50%
Turnout		57,905	100.00%

== Democratic primary ==
=== Candidates ===
- Robert C. Murchie
- Albert W. Noone, Democratic nominee for governor in 1914

=== Results ===
1926 Democratic U.S. Senate primary
Party	Candidate	Votes	%
Democratic	Robert C. Murchie	6,121	68.81%
Democratic	Albert W. Noone	2,774	31.19%
Total votes		8,895	100.00%
	Blank ballots	2,574	22.44%
Turnout		11,469	100.00%

== General election ==
=== Candidates ===
- George H. Moses, incumbent U.S. Senator since 1918 (Republican)
- Robert C. Murchie (Democratic)

=== Results ===
1926 U.S. Senate election in New Hampshire
Party	Candidate	Votes	%	±%
Republican	George H. Moses (Incumbent)	79,279	62.32%	
Democratic	Robert C. Murchie	47,935	37.68%	
Total votes		127,214	100.00%	
Republican hold		Swing		
