= Irving W. Drew =

American politician (1845–1922)

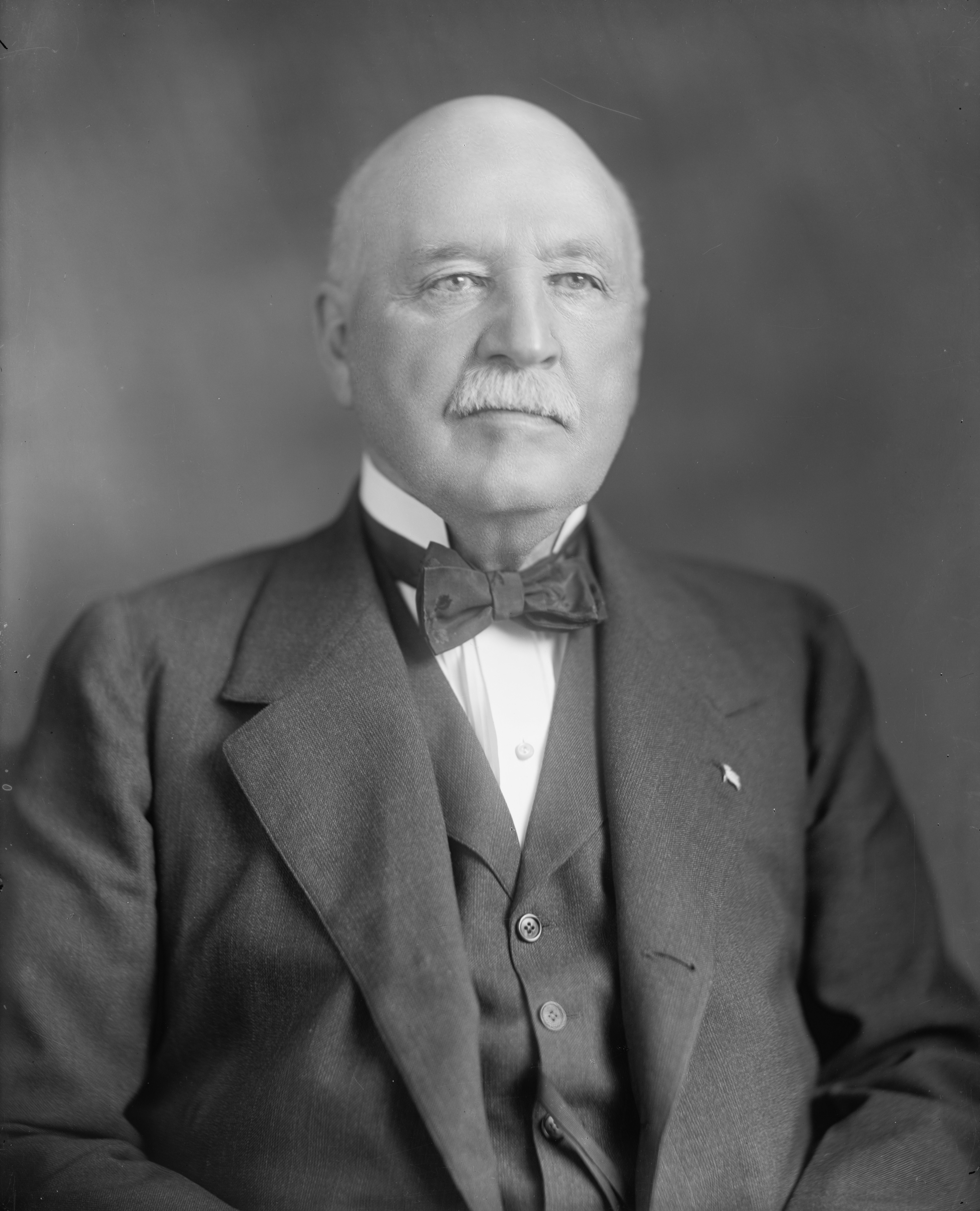
- Drew in 1905
- In office September 2, 1918 – November 5, 1918
- Appointed by: Henry W. Keyes
- Preceded by: Jacob H. Gallinger
- Succeeded by: George H. Moses

Member of the New Hampshire Senate
- In office 1883–1884

Personal details
- Born: January 8, 1845 Colebrook, New Hampshire
- Died: April 10, 1922 (aged 77) Montclair, New Jersey
- Party: Democratic, later Republican
- Education: Dartmouth College

Irving Webster Drew (January 8, 1845 – April 10, 1922) was a United States senator from New Hampshire. Born in Colebrook, he attended Kimball Union Academy and graduated from Dartmouth College in 1870. He moved to Lancaster, New Hampshire, where he studied law, and was admitted to the bar in 1871 and commenced practice in Lancaster. He was appointed major of the New Hampshire National Guard in 1876 and served three years. Between 1883 and 1884, he was a member of the New Hampshire Senate. He left the Democratic Party in 1896 and became a member of the Republican Party. In 1899, he was president of the New Hampshire Bar Association. He was a delegate to the State constitutional conventions in 1902 and 1912, and engaged in banking and the railroad business.

Drew was appointed on September 2, 1918, as a Republican to the U.S. Senate to fill the vacancy caused by the death of Jacob H. Gallinger and served from September 2, to November 5, 1918, when a successor was elected. He was not a candidate for election and retired from active business pursuits. He died in Montclair, New Jersey in 1922; was interment in Summer Street Cemetery, Lancaster.

U.S. Senate
Preceded by Jacob H. Gallinger	U.S. senator (Class 3) from New Hampshire; 1918; Served alongside: Henry F. Hollis	Succeeded by George H. Moses
