= Jacob H. Gallinger =

American politician (1837–1918)

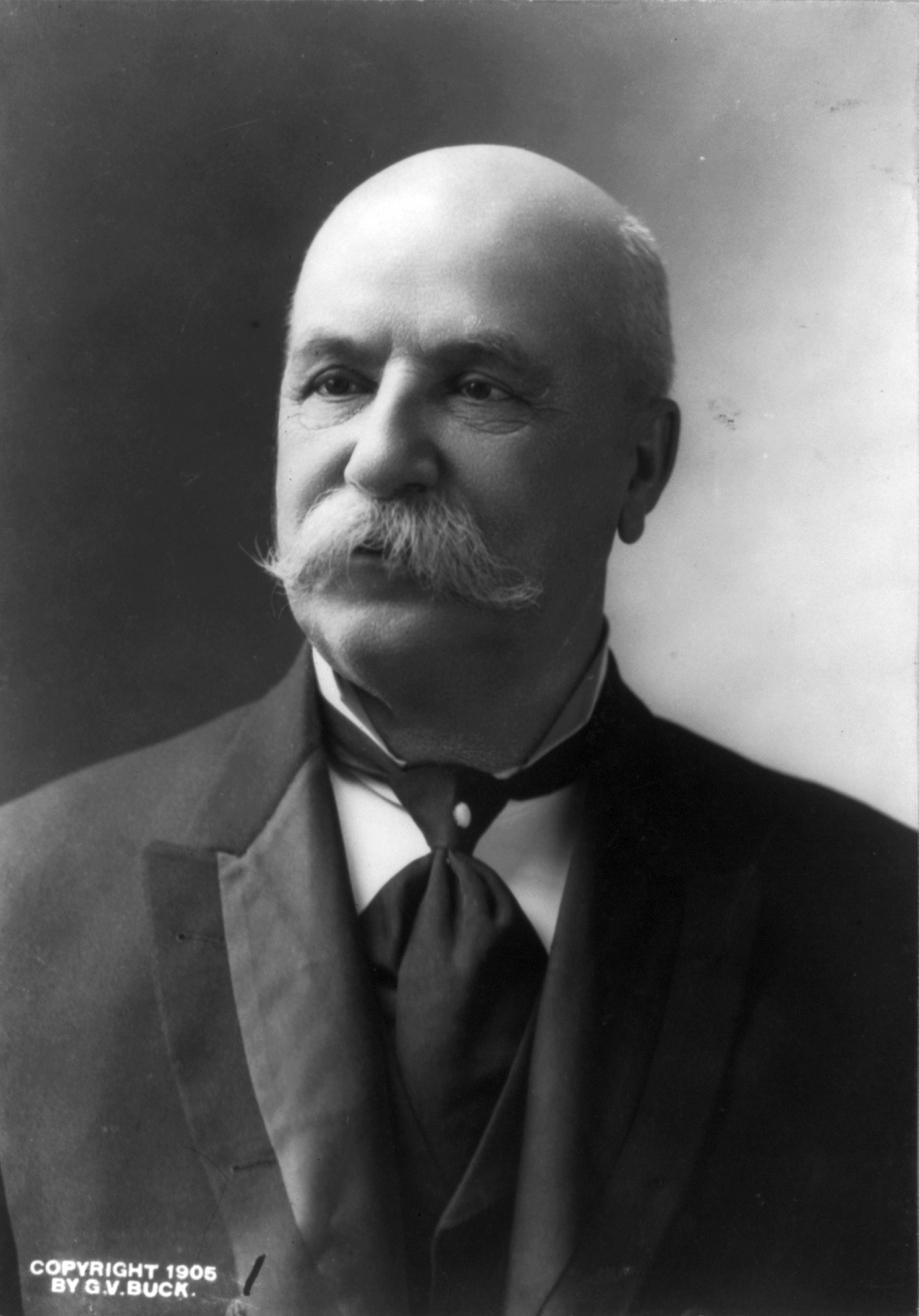
- Gallinger, c. 1905

Chairman of the Senate Republican Conference
- In office March 4, 1913 – August 17, 1918
- Deputy: James Wolcott Wadsworth Jr. (1915)
- Preceded by: Shelby Moore Cullom
- Succeeded by: Henry Cabot Lodge

President pro tempore of the United States Senate
- In office February 12, 1912 – March 3, 1913 Serving with Augustus O. Bacon, Frank B. Brandegee & Henry Cabot Lodge
- Preceded by: Augustus O. Bacon
- Succeeded by: James Paul Clarke

United States Senator from New Hampshire
- In office March 4, 1891 – August 17, 1918
- Preceded by: Henry W. Blair
- Succeeded by: Irving W. Drew

Member of the U.S. House of Representatives from New Hampshire's 2nd district
- In office March 4, 1885 – March 3, 1889
- Preceded by: Ossian Ray
- Succeeded by: Orren C. Moore

Member of the New Hampshire Senate
- In office 1878–1880

Member of the New Hampshire House of Representatives
- In office 1872–1873

Personal details
- Born: March 28, 1837 Cornwall, Ontario, British Canada
- Died: August 17, 1918 (aged 81) Franklin, New Hampshire, U.S.
- Party: Republican

Jacob Harold Gallinger (March 28, 1837 – August 17, 1918) was an American politician who was United States senator from New Hampshire from 1891 to 1918 and president pro tempore of the Senate from 1912 to 1913.

== Early life and career ==
Jacob Harold Gallinger was born in Cornwall, Ontario, British Canada on March 28, 1837. His father's family were German and his mother's was German American.

He was home-schooled from an early age.

Gallinger moved to the U.S. at an early age and first worked as a printer.

== Medical career ==
Gallinger studied medicine at the Cincinnati Eclectic Medical Institute and graduated at the head of his class in May 1858. He studied abroad for three years, writing and working as a printer to cover his expenses. In 1861, he returned to the United States and engaged in the practice of homeopathic medicine and surgery in Keene, New Hampshire before moving to Concord, New Hampshire in April 1862. He practiced medicine actively until 1885.

He was an active member of the American Institute of Homeopathy from 1868 to 1880, and throughout his political career, he was a forthright advocate of the homeopathic school of thought and practice. Besides the AIH, he was a member of many state and national medical societies and a frequent contributor to the journals of his profession. He was on the board of trustees of Columbia Hospital for Women, and a member of the board of visitors to Providence Hospital.

== Early political career ==
=== State legislature ===
Gallinger was elected to the New Hampshire House of Representatives in 1872 and re-elected in 1873. He served as a member of the state constitutional convention in 1876. He was then elected to the New Hampshire Senate and served from 1878 to 1880. In 1879, he was elected Senate President.

He became surgeon general of New Hampshire under Governor Natt Head, with the rank of brigadier general, from 1879 to 1880. In 1882, he was elected chairman of the New Hampshire Republican Party and remained in that role until his resignation in 1890.

=== United States House of Representatives ===
In 1884, Gallinger was elected to the United States House of Representatives, serving from March 4, 1885, to March 3, 1889, but declined to be a candidate for reelection in 1888.

In 1888, Gallinger served as chairman of the New Hampshire delegation to the Republican National Convention at Chicago, where he seconded the nomination of Benjamin Harrison of Indiana for president.

== United States Senate ==
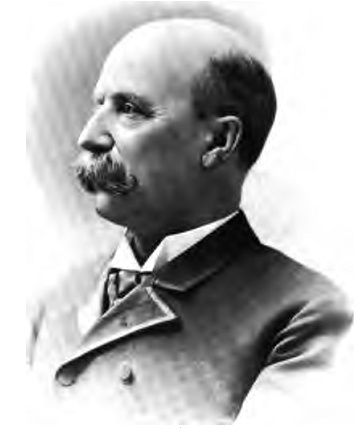
Gallinger circa 1903

In 1890, Gallinger was elected to the New Hampshire House again, but served only a short time before the legislature elected him to the United States Senate in 1891. He was reelected by the legislature without Republican opposition in 1897, 1903 and 1909, and by popular vote in 1914. He served from March 4, 1891, until his death in Franklin, New Hampshire in 1918.

As Senator, Gallinger chaired the New Hampshire delegations to the Republican National Convention of 1888, 1900, 1904 and 1908, and for a time was a member of the Republican National Committee.

In 1898, Gallinger returned to the role of chairman of the New Hampshire Republican Party and was re-elected in 1900 and 1902. In 1901, he was also elected to represent New Hampshire on the Republican National Committee.

As Senator he was considered a master of parliamentary law and was frequently called upon to preside over the Senate. He was also an active public speaker in and out of the Senate.

He served as president pro tempore during the Sixty-second Congress and was also Republican Conference chairman. He also chaired the Committee on Transportation Routes to the Seaboard, Committee on Pensions, Committee on the District of Columbia, and the Merchant Marine Commission. He was named a member of the National Forest Reservation Commission, established by the Weeks Act, which Gallinger sponsored in the Senate.

== Personal life and death ==
Gallinger received the honorary degree of A.M. from Dartmouth College in 1885 and served as trustee of George Washington University for several years. He was interred at Blossom Hill Cemetery, Concord.

== See also ==
- List of members of the United States Congress who died in office (1900–1949)
- List of United States senators born outside the United States

== Notes ==
Party political offices
First	Republican nominee for U.S. Senator from New Hampshire (Class 3); 1914	Succeeded by George H. Moses
U.S. House of Representatives
Preceded by Ossian Ray	U.S. Congressman from New Hampshire; 1885–1889	Succeeded by Orren C. Moore
U.S. Senate
Preceded by Henry W. Blair	United States Senator from New Hampshire; 1891–1918	Succeeded by Irving W. Drew
Political offices
Preceded by William P. Frye	President pro tempore of the United States Senate; Rotating pro tems	Succeeded by James P. Clarke
Preceded by David H. Buffum	President of the New Hampshire Senate; 1879–1881	Succeeded by John Kimball
Honorary titles
Preceded by Shelby Moore Cullom	Dean of the United States Senate; March 4, 1913 – August 17, 1918	Succeeded by Henry Cabot Lodge
