= 1944 United States Senate election in New Hampshire =

- November 7, 1944
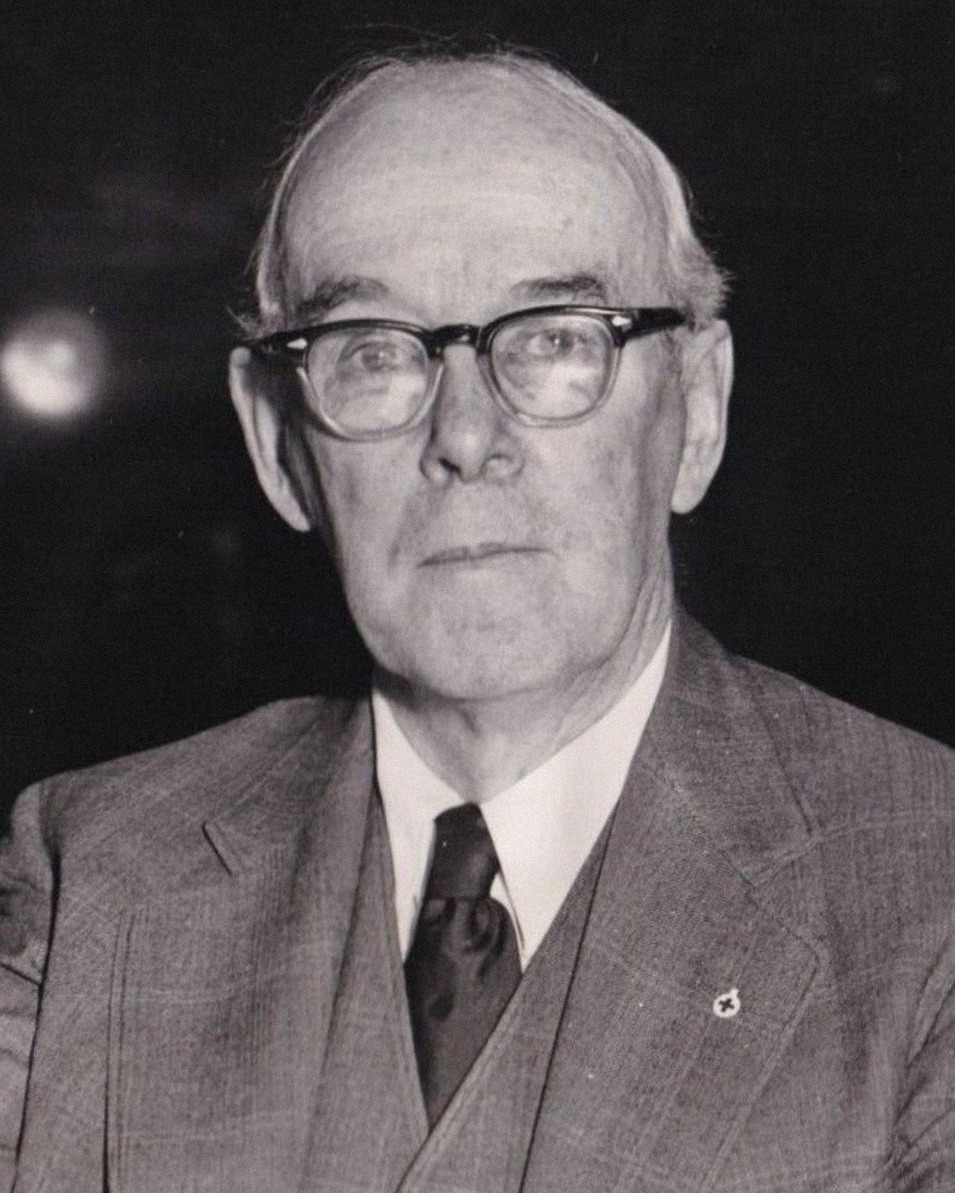

| Nominee | Charles W. Tobey | Joseph J. Betley |
| Party | Republican | Democratic |
| Popular vote | 110,549 | 106,508 |
| Percentage | 50.93% | 49.07% |
- Tobey: 50–60% 60–70% 70–80% 80–90% >90% Betley: 50–60% 60–70% 70–80% 80–90% Tie: 50%
Senator before election
Charles W. Tobey
Republican
Elected Senator
Charles W. Tobey
Republican

The 1944 United States Senate election in New Hampshire took place on November 7, 1944. Incumbent Republican Senator Charles W. Tobey won re-election to a second term.

== Republican primary ==
=== Candidates ===
- Foster W. Stearns, U.S. Representative from Hancock
- Charles W. Tobey, incumbent U.S. Senator since 1939

=== Campaign ===
U.S. Representative Foster W. Stearns, who had succeeded Tobey in the House in 1939, announced a primary challenge to Tobey on July 19, 1943.

=== Results ===
The Associated Press declared Tobey the winner on the basis of partial returns showing him leading Stearns by about 6,400 votes.

1944 Republican U.S. Senate primary
| Party | Candidate | Votes | % |
|---|---|---|---|
| Republican | Charles W. Tobey (incumbent) | 27,183 | 57.12% |
| Republican | Foster W. Stearns | 20,407 | 42.88% |
| Total votes | | 47,590 | 100.00% |

== Democratic primary ==
=== Candidates ===
- Joseph J. Betley, attorney and former state representative from Manchester

=== Results ===
1944 Democratic U.S. Senate primary
| Party | Candidate | Votes | % |
|---|---|---|---|
| Democratic | Joseph J. Betley | 12,798 | 100.00% |
| Total votes | | 12,798 | 100.00% |

== General election ==
=== Candidates ===
- Joseph J. Betley, attorney and former state representative from Manchester (Democratic)
- Charles W. Tobey, incumbent Senator since 1939 (Republican)

=== Campaign ===
Although New Hampshire was considered a close state in the concurrent presidential election, Tobey was expected to win re-election to a third term. During the race, Tobey came under sustained attack from the Democratic Party and state Congress of Industrial Organizations as an "isolationist" and "reactionary".

Tobey's prospects may have been aided by a split in the New Hampshire Democratic Party over the election of former Republican governor Francis P. Murphy as Democratic National Committeeman, and the appointment of a new Democratic nominee for Hillsborough County Sheriff.

=== Results ===
1944 U.S. Senate election in New Hampshire
| Party | Candidate | Votes | % | ±% |
|---|---|---|---|---|
| Republican | Charles W. Tobey (incumbent) | 110,549 | 50.93% | ▼4.30 |
| Democratic | Joseph J. Betley | 106,508 | 49.07% | ▲4.30 |
| Total votes | | 217,057 | 100.00% | |
| Republican hold | | Swing | | |
