= 1950 United States Senate election in New Hampshire =

- November 7, 1950
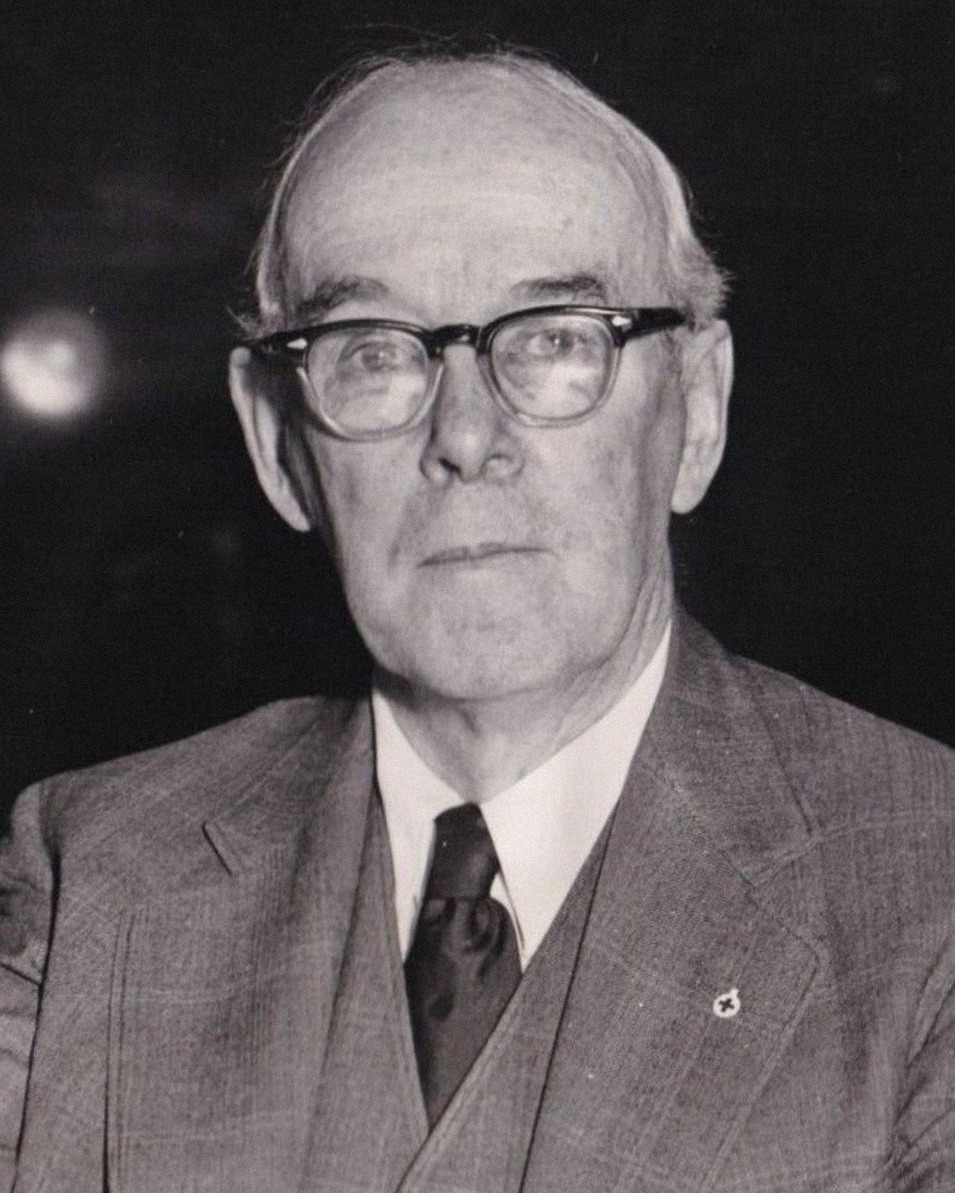

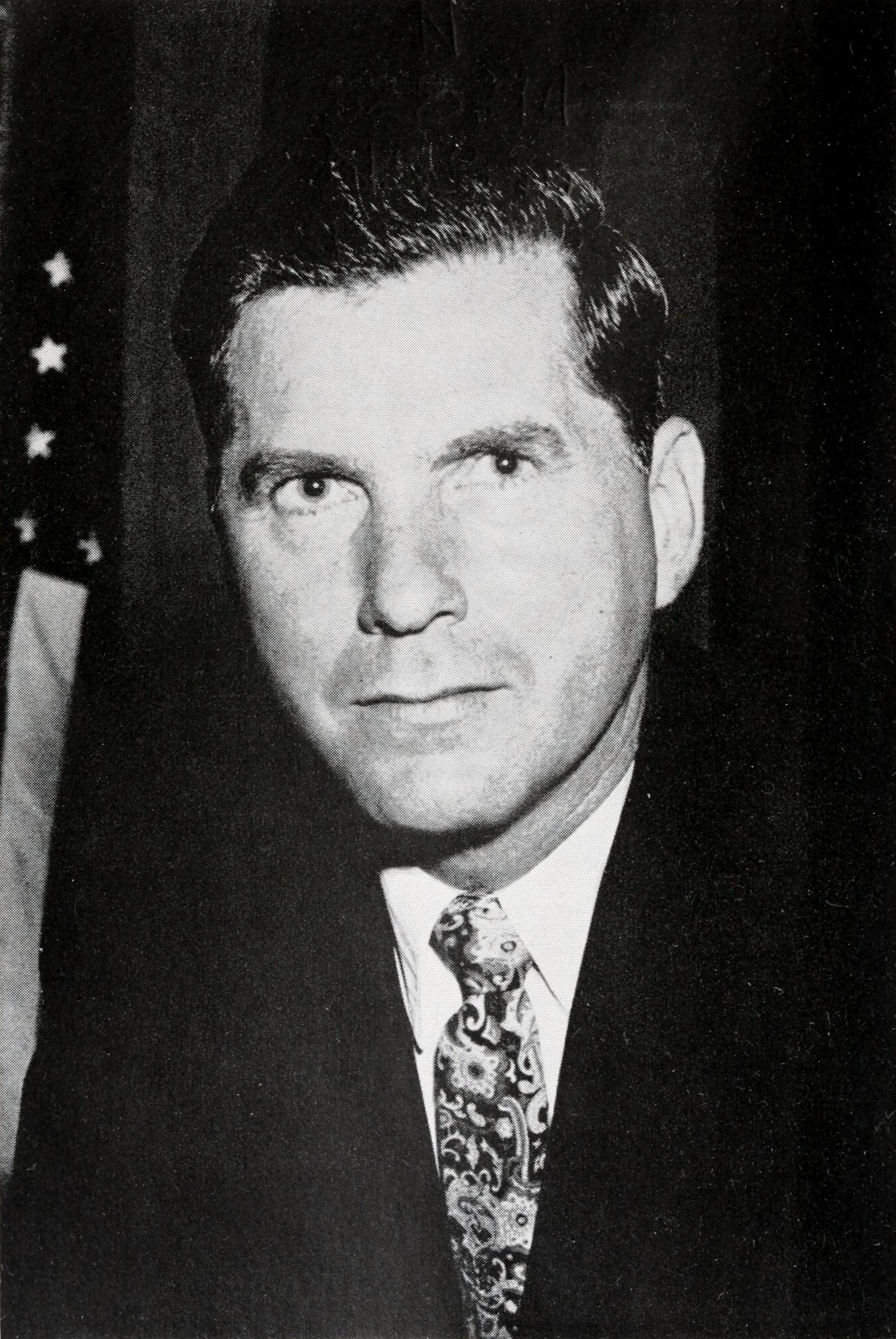
Nominee	Charles W. Tobey	Emmet J. Kelley	Wesley Powell (write-in)
Party	Republican	Democratic	Republican
Popular vote	106,142	72,473	10,943
Percentage	55.99%	38.23%	5.77%
- Tobey: 40–50% 50–60% 60–70% 70–80% 80–90% >90% Kelley: 40–50% 50–60% 60–70% 70–80% Kelley: 40–50%
Senator before election
Charles W. Tobey
Republican
Elected Senator
Charles W. Tobey
Republican

The 1950 United States Senate election in New Hampshire took place on November 7, 1950. Incumbent Republican Senator Charles W. Tobey won re-election to a third full term.

Primary elections were held on September 12. Tobey narrowly survived a challenge from Manchester attorney and future governor Wesley Powell.

== Republican primary ==
=== Candidates ===
- Wesley Powell, Manchester attorney and aide to Styles Bridges
- Charles W. Tobey, incumbent U.S. Senator since 1939

Wesley Powell, making his first bid for elective office of an eventual twelve, was an assistant to Tobey's Senate colleague Styles Bridges.

=== Campaign ===
Tobey's fourth campaign for the Republican nomination for Senate was among the bitterest of his thirty-year political career. Powell waged an aggressively critical campaign, referring to Tobey as a "Truman Republican". Tobey fought back hard, relishing his reputation as a political maverick and arguing that whether he was a loyal Republican or not, he had always voted "for the best interests of New Hampshire and all the people regardless of party."

Styles Bridges remained officially neutral in the campaign.

=== Results ===
The results were unclear through election night, with Tobey declared the winner by the Associated Press after the final tabulation in the early hours of September 13. Powell showed unexpected strength in communities which had historically backed Tobey.

1950 Republican U.S. Senate primary
Party	Candidate	Votes	%
Republican	Charles W. Tobey (incumbent)	39,203	50.85%
Republican	Wesley Powell	39,203	49.15%
Total votes		77,096	100.00%
{{{party}}}	Blank ballots	1,906	2.48%
Turnout		79,002	100.00%

== Democratic primary ==
=== Candidates ===
- Emmet J. Kelley, state senator from Berlin and member of the New Hampshire racing commission

=== Results ===
1950 Democratic U.S. Senate primary
Party	Candidate	Votes	%
Democratic	Emmet J. Kelley	20,095	100.00%
Total votes		20,095	100.00%
{{{party}}}	Blank ballots	9,090	31.15%
Turnout		29,185	100.00%

== General election ==
=== Candidates ===
- Emmet J. Kelley, state senator from Berlin and member of the New Hampshire racing commission (Democratic)
- Wesley Powell, Manchester attorney and aide to Styles Bridges (write-in)
- Charles W. Tobey, incumbent Senator since 1939 (Republican)

=== Campaign ===
Following his narrow loss in the Republican primary, Wesley Powell attempted to run an independent campaign, which threatened to split the Republican vote and elect the first Democratic senator from New Hampshire in over twenty years. However, the New Hampshire State Ballot Law Commission ruled in favor of Tobey on October 6, who argued that Powell's nominating petitions were "invalid and illegal" because they had not been "filed forty days prior to the election as required by law." Powell acquiesced to the ruling.

=== Results ===
1950 U.S. Senate election in New Hampshire
Party	Candidate	Votes	%	±%
Republican	Charles W. Tobey (incumbent)	106,142	55.99%	▲5.06
Democratic	Emmet J. Kelley	72,473	38.23%	▼10.84
Independent	Wesley Powell (write-in)	10,943	5.77%	N/A
Total votes		189,558	100.00%	
Republican hold		Swing		
