= 1936 New Hampshire gubernatorial election =

- November 3, 1936
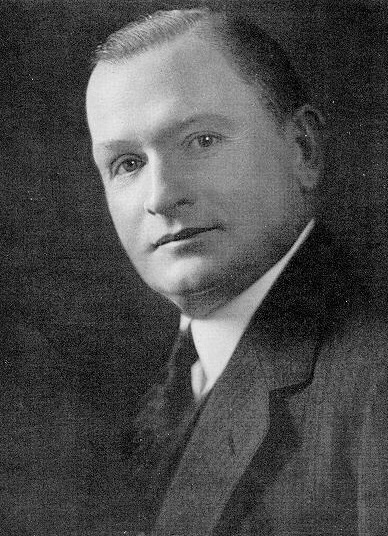

Nominee	Francis P. Murphy	Amos Blandin
Party	Republican	Democratic
Popular vote	118,178	89,011
Percentage	56.60%	42.63%
- Murphy: 40-50% 50–60% 60–70% 70–80% 80–90% >90% Blandin: 50–60% 60–70% 70–80% 80–90% Tie: 50%
Governor before election
Styles Bridges
Republican
Elected Governor
Francis P. Murphy
Republican

The 1936 New Hampshire gubernatorial election was held on November 3, 1936. Republican nominee Francis P. Murphy defeated Democratic nominee Amos Blandin with 56.60% of the vote.

== Primary elections ==
Primary elections were held on September 15, 1936.

=== Republican primary ===
==== Candidates ====
- Francis P. Murphy, former member of the Executive Council of New Hampshire
- Eliot A. Carter

==== Results ====
Republican primary results
Party	Candidate	Votes	%
Republican	Francis P. Murphy	45,955	61.87
Republican	Eliot A. Carter	28,322	38.13
Total votes		74,277	100.00

== General election ==
=== Candidates ===
Major party candidates

- Francis P. Murphy, Republican
- Amos Blandin, Democratic

Other candidates

- Arthur J. Bergeron, Farmer–Labor

=== Results ===
1936 New Hampshire gubernatorial election
Party	Candidate	Votes	%	±%
Republican	Francis P. Murphy	118,178	56.60%	
Democratic	Amos Blandin	89,011	42.63%	
Farmer–Labor	Arthur J. Bergeron	1,617	0.77%	
Majority		29,167		
Turnout				
Republican hold		Swing		
