= 1954 United States Senate election in New Hampshire =

- November 2, 1954
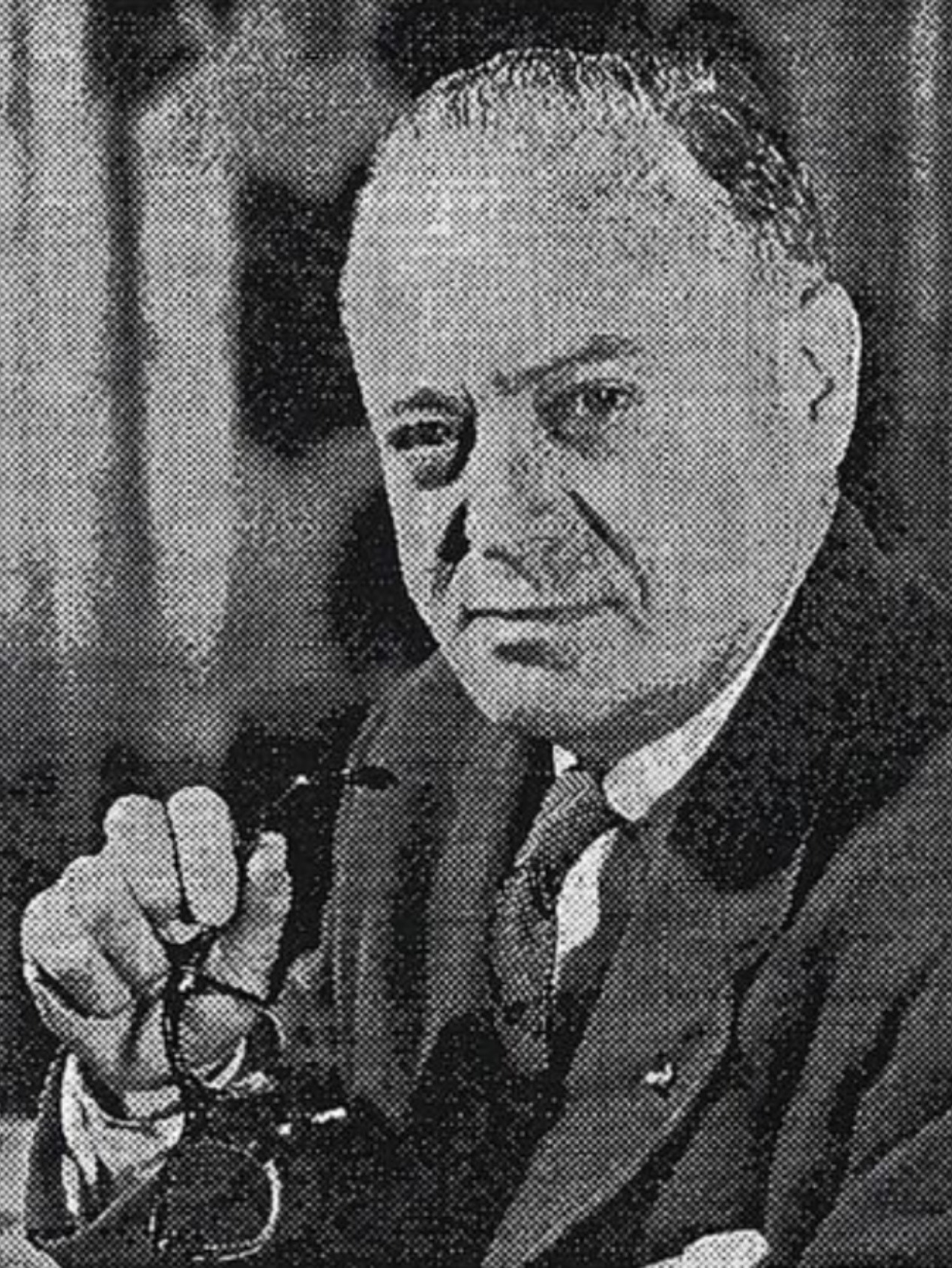

Nominee	Styles Bridges	Gerald L. Morin
Party	Republican	Democratic
Popular vote	117,150	77,386
Percentage	60.22%	39.78%
- Bridges: 50–60% 60–70% 70–80% 80–90% >90% Morin: 50–60% 60–70% 70–80%
U.S. senator before election
Styles Bridges
Republican
Elected U.S. Senator
Styles Bridges
Republican

The 1954 United States Senate election in New Hampshire took place on November 2, 1954. Incumbent Republican Senator Styles Bridges won re-election to a fourth term in office, defeating Democrat Gerald Morin.

Primary elections were held on September 14, 1954.

== Republican primary ==
=== Candidates ===
- Styles Bridges, incumbent Senator since 1937

=== Results ===
1954 Republican U.S. Senate primary
Party	Candidate	Votes	%
Republican	Styles Bridges (incumbent)	62,524	100.00%
Total votes		62,524	100.00%

== Democratic primary ==
=== Candidates ===
- Albert R. Courtois
- Eugene S. Daniell Jr.
- Gerald L. Morin, mayor of Laconia
- Frank L. Sullivan

=== Results ===
1954 Democratic U.S. Senate primary
Party	Candidate	Votes	%
Democratic	Gerald L. Morin	9,839	40.01%
Democratic	Frank L. Sullivan	7,317	29.76%
Democratic	Eugene S. Daniell Jr.	4,675	19.01%
Democratic	Albert Courtois	2,759	11.22%
Total votes		24,590	100.00%

== General election ==
=== Candidates ===
- Styles Bridges, incumbent Senator since 1937 (Republican)
- Gerald L. Morin (Democratic)

=== Results ===
1954 U.S. Senate election in New Hampshire
Party	Candidate	Votes	%	±%
Republican	Styles Bridges (incumbent)	117,150	60.22%	▲2.08
Democratic	Gerald L. Morin	77,386	39.78%	▼1.39
Total votes		194,536	100.00%	
Republican hold				

== See also ==
- 1954 United States Senate elections
