= 1934 New Hampshire gubernatorial election =

- November 6, 1934
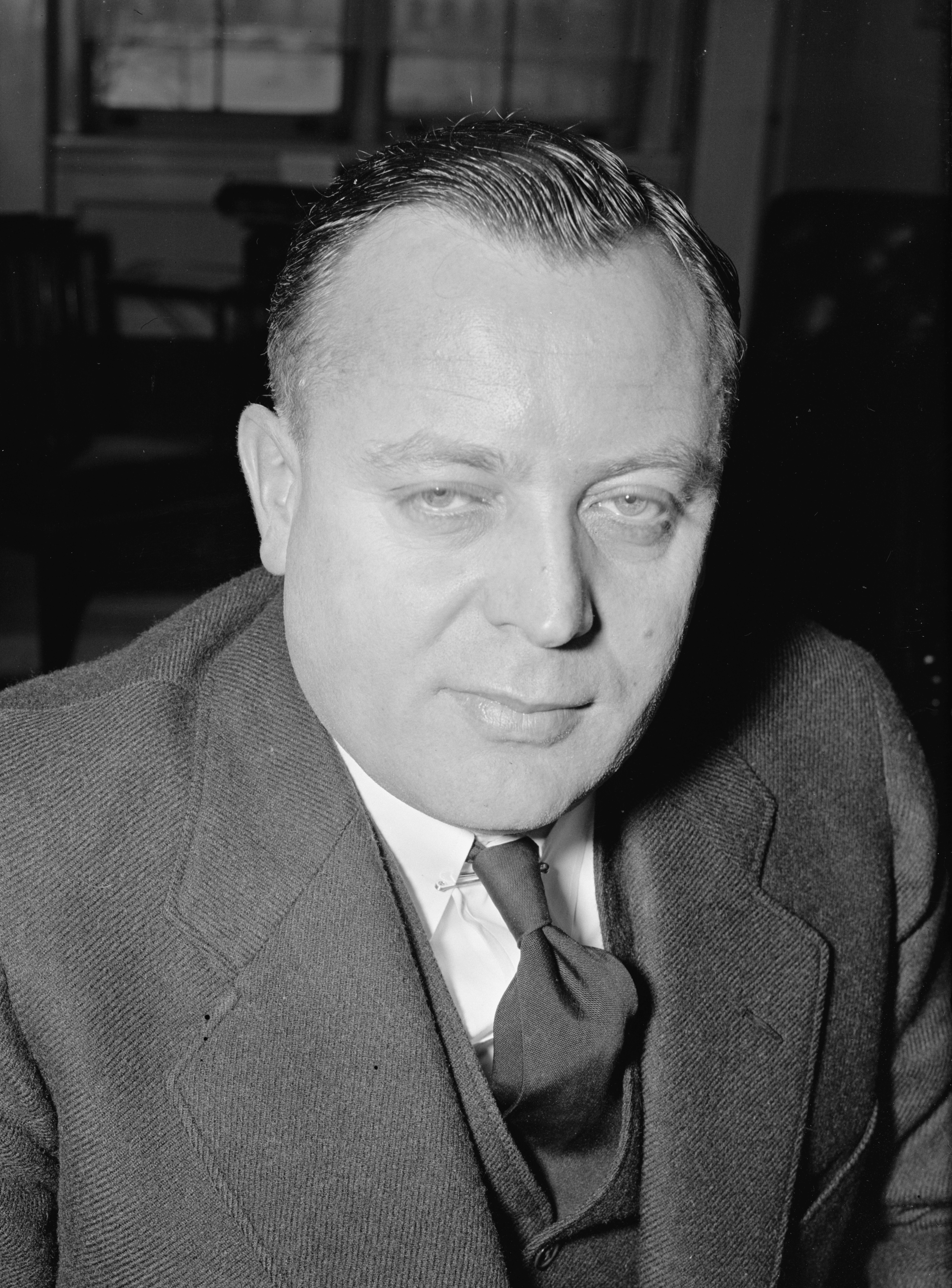

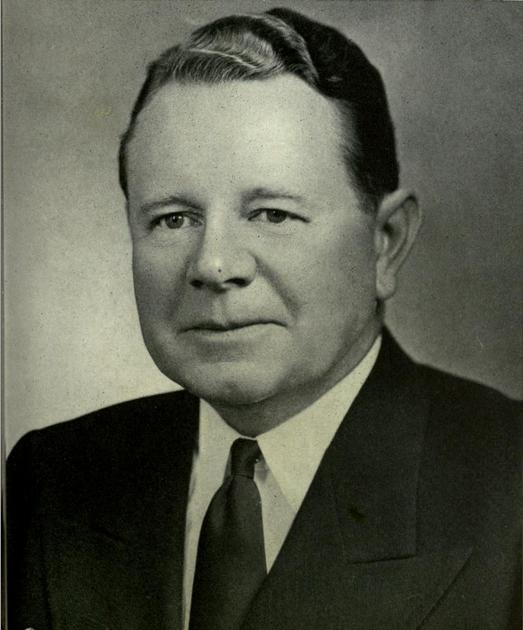
Nominee	Styles Bridges	John L. Sullivan
Party	Republican	Democratic
Popular vote	89,481	87,019
Percentage	50.55%	49.16%
- Bridges: 50–60% 60–70% 70–80% 80–90% >90% Sullivan: 40-50% 50–60% 60–70% 70–80% 80–90% Tie: 40-50%
Governor before election
John Gilbert Winant
Republican
Elected Governor
Styles Bridges
Republican

The 1934 New Hampshire gubernatorial election was held on November 6, 1934. Republican nominee Styles Bridges defeated Democratic nominee John L. Sullivan with 50.55% of the vote.

== Primary elections ==
Primary elections were held on September 11, 1934.

=== Democratic primary ===
==== Candidates ====
- John L. Sullivan
- Eaton D. Sargent
- George H. Duncan

==== Results ====
Democratic primary results
Party	Candidate	Votes	%
Democratic	John L. Sullivan	21,022	63.75
Democratic	Eaton D. Sargent	6,587	19.98
Democratic	George H. Duncan	5,367	16.28
Total votes		32,976	100.00

=== Republican primary ===
==== Candidates ====
- Styles Bridges, New Hampshire Public Service Commissioner
- Charles E. Carroll

==== Results ====
Republican primary results
Party	Candidate	Votes	%
Republican	Styles Bridges	33,952	64.70
Republican	Charles E. Carroll	18,526	35.30
Total votes		52,478	100.00

== General election ==
=== Candidates ===
Major party candidates

- Styles Bridges, Republican
- John L. Sullivan, Democratic

Other candidates

- Eli Bourdon, Socialist
- Elba K. Chase, Communist

=== Results ===
1934 New Hampshire gubernatorial election
Party	Candidate	Votes	%	±%
Republican	Styles Bridges	89,481	50.55%	
Democratic	John L. Sullivan	87,019	49.16%	
Socialist	Eli Bourdon	278	0.16%	
Communist	Elba K. Chase	244	0.14%	
Majority		2,462		
Turnout				
Republican hold		Swing		
