= 1942 United States Senate election in New Hampshire =

- November 3, 1942
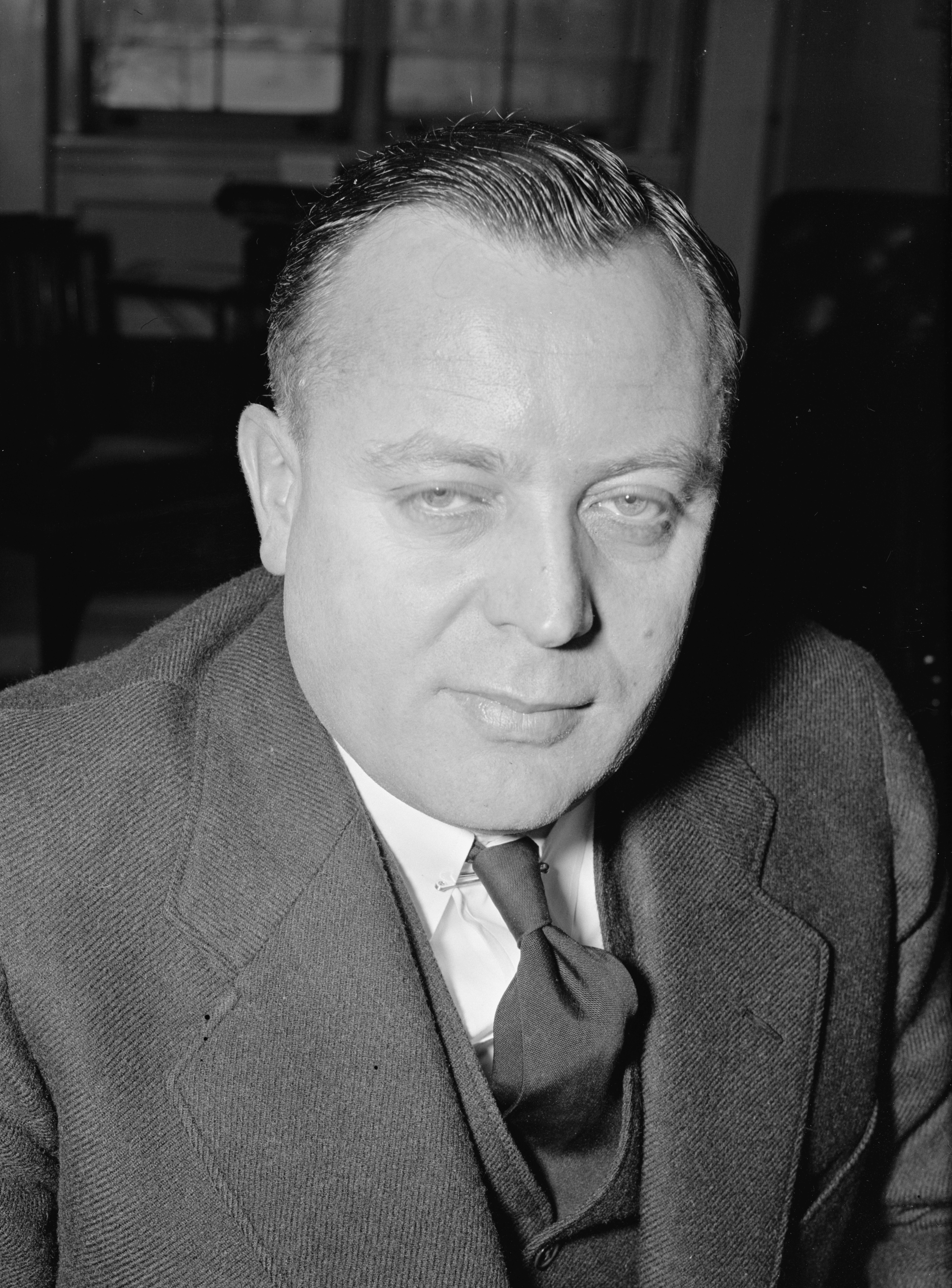

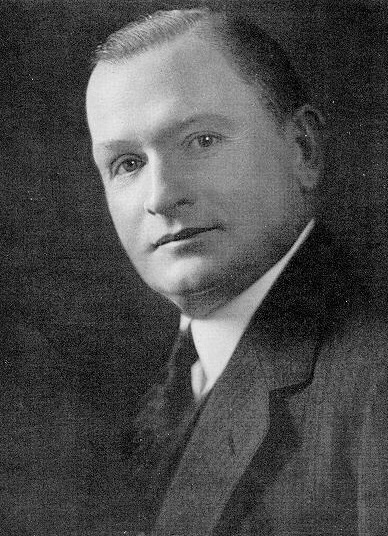
Nominee	Styles Bridges	Francis P. Murphy
Party	Republican	Democratic
Popular vote	88,601	73,656
Percentage	54.60%	45.40%
- Bridges: 50–60% 60–70% 70–80% 80–90% >90% Murphy: 50–60% 60–70% 70–80% 80–90% Tie: 50%
U.S. senator before election
Styles Bridges
Republican
Elected U.S. Senator
Styles Bridges
Republican

The 1942 United States Senate election in New Hampshire took place on November 3, 1942. Incumbent Republican Senator Styles Bridges won re-election to a second term in office, defeating Democratic former Governor Francis P. Murphy.

Primary elections were held on September 15, 1942.

== Republican primary ==
=== Candidates ===
- Styles Bridges, incumbent Senator since 1937
- Arthur J. Gruenler

=== Results ===
1942 Republican U.S. Senate primary
Party	Candidate	Votes	%
Republican	Styles Bridges (incumbent)	37,045	92.42%
Republican	Alfred J. Gruenlin	3,040	7.58%
Total votes		40,085	100.00%

== Democratic primary ==
=== Candidates ===
- Francis P. Murphy, former Governor of New Hampshire (1937–1941)

=== Results ===
1942 Democratic U.S. Senate primary
Party	Candidate	Votes	%
Democratic	Francis P. Murphy	16,653	68.70%
Democratic	Joseph A. Millimet	7,588	31.30%
Total votes		24,241	100.00%

== General election ==
=== Candidates ===
- Styles Bridges, incumbent Senator since 1937 (Republican)
- Francis P. Murphy, former Governor of New Hampshire (Democratic)

=== Results ===
1942 U.S. Senate election in New Hampshire
Party	Candidate	Votes	%	±%
Republican	Styles Bridges (incumbent)	88,601	54.60%	▲3.13
Democratic	Francis P. Murphy	73,656	45.40%	▼2.27
Total votes		162,257	100.00%	
Republican hold				

== See also ==
- 1942 United States Senate elections
