= Charles W. Tobey =

American politician (1880–1953)

Charles William Tobey
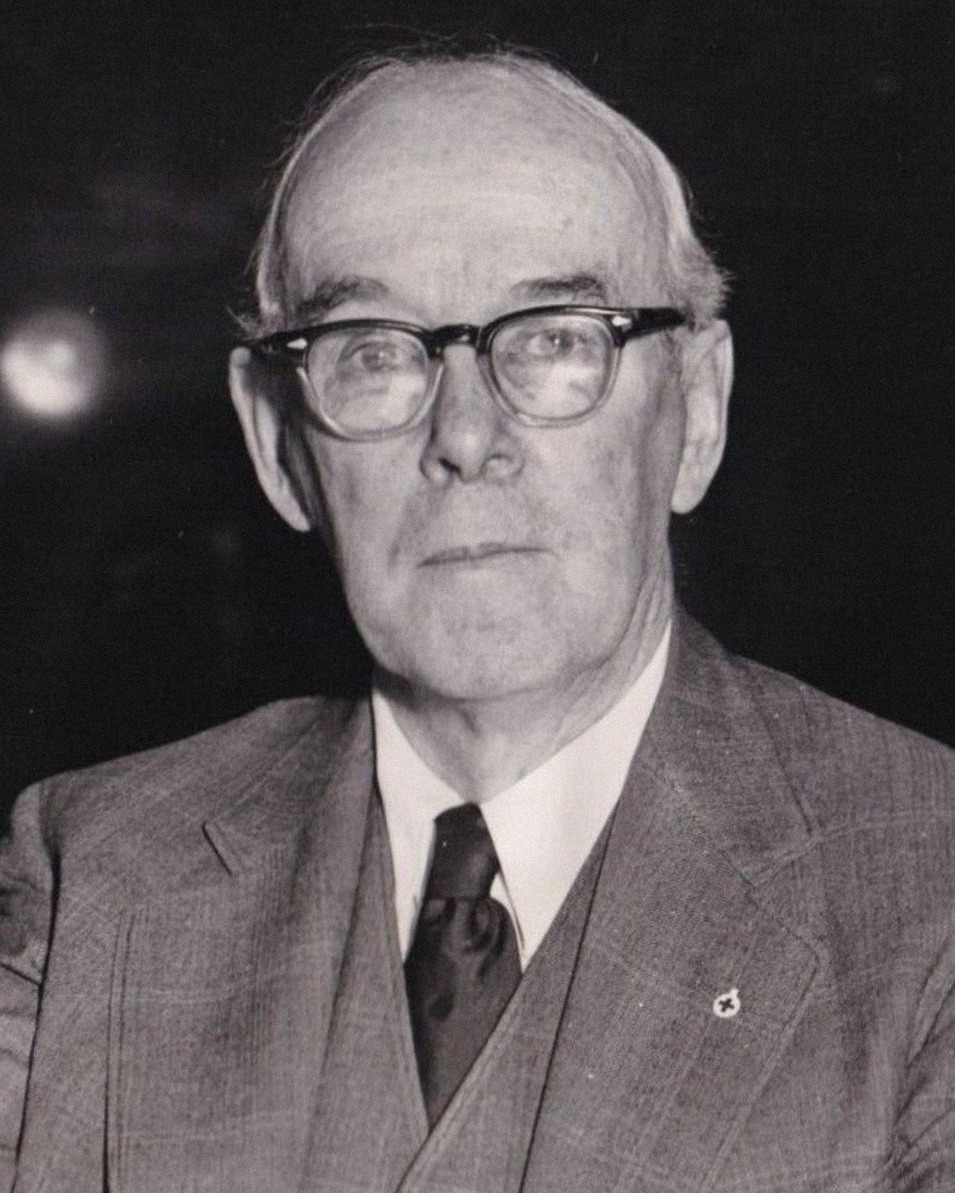
- Tobey in 1953

62nd Governor of New Hampshire
- In office January 3, 1929 – January 1, 1931
- Preceded by: Huntley N. Spaulding
- Succeeded by: John G. Winant

United States Senator from New Hampshire
- In office January 3, 1939 – July 24, 1953
- Preceded by: Fred H. Brown
- Succeeded by: Robert W. Upton

Member of the United States House of Representatives from New Hampshire's 2nd district
- In office March 4, 1933 – January 3, 1939
- Preceded by: Edward H. Wason
- Succeeded by: Foster W. Stearns

Member of the New Hampshire House of Representatives

Personal details
- Born: July 22, 1880 Roxbury, Massachusetts
- Died: July 24, 1953 (aged 73) Bethesda, Maryland
- Party: Republican
- Spouse(s): Francelia Lovett (desc.); Loretta Capell Rabenhorst (desc.); Lillian Crompton

Charles William Tobey (July 22, 1880 – July 24, 1953) was an American politician. A member of the Republican Party, he served as the 62nd governor of New Hampshire from 1929 to 1931, and represented New Hampshire in the United States Senate from 1939 until his death in 1953.

== Early life ==
He was born in Roxbury, Massachusetts, the son of William Tobey, an accountant, and Ellen Hall Parker Tobey. His father had moved to Massachusetts from Maine in the 1860s. Charles Tobey had relatively little formal education. He attended the Roxbury Latin School for four years (being part of the Class of 1897), but was forced to withdraw before graduation because of family financial difficulties. He had a thorough knowledge of the Bible, however, which he gained from his mother, an ardent Baptist. As a result, Tobey's speeches were always marked by a generous sprinkling of biblical quotations and classical allusions.

On June 4, 1902, Tobey married Francelia Lovett. A year later they began to spend summers in Temple, New Hampshire, on an old farm that they had purchased from Lucius W. Felt, whose great-uncle Peter Felt Sr. erected the house in 1789.

== Career ==
For several years Tobey commuted during the summers to Boston, where he worked as a clerk for various insurance and banking firms. In 1911, however, he decided to move to Temple and become a full-time farmer. He was a good poultryman and considered himself a farmer for the remainder of his life, although in 1916 he moved to Manchester, New Hampshire, to resume a career as a bond salesman. His four children were born in Temple, which Tobey always maintained as his legal residence.

Tobey served on the Temple school board and the board of selectmen. In 1914 he was elected to the state legislature as a candidate of the Progressive Party. He was a friend and disciple of the progressive Republican Robert P. Bass, a former governor. New Hampshire progressivism was characterized by an effort to democratize the processes and make equitable the administration of government and to challenge powerful economic interests such as the Boston and Maine Railroad. Tobey's hard-working manner, wit, and commonsense intelligence led to his political success. He served three non-consecutive terms in the New Hampshire House of Representatives and was speaker in 1919–1920, winning an important victory over the old-guard candidate. Tobey had returned to the Republican Party after the 1914 election.

Tobey's experience in the bonding business as well as his general reputation and political contacts led to his selection as New Hampshire Liberty Loan chairman during World War I. Later, as a member of the New Hampshire Food Administration, he came to know Herbert Hoover, who, together with Bass and Charles Evans Hughes, greatly influenced Tobey's political beliefs.

In 1924 Tobey was elected to the New Hampshire Senate, and he served as president of that body during the administration of progressive governor John Gilbert Winant. In 1928, despite opposition in the primary from the old guard, led by George Moses, Tobey won the governorship. During the first two years of the Great Depression, he retained a progressive approach to government operation and continued the state road-building program. But Tobey resembled President Hoover in his budget-tightening approach to economic disaster.

Tobey did not run for re-election in 1930, in part because of personal financial problems. In 1932, however, he won a seat in the United States House of Representatives and was re-elected in 1934 and 1936. Tobey supported early New Deal relief measures, but became an increasingly outspoken foe of Franklin D. Roosevelt. He opposed efforts to restructure the economy, and he expressed great concern over the growth of executive power. In 1938 he joined Styles Bridges, another Bass protégé and the manager of Tobey's 1928 gubernatorial victory, in the United States Senate.

Tobey joined with the isolationist bloc in the Senate in opposition to the Roosevelt administration's policies on neutrality and preparedness. He blamed producers of war materials for American entry into World War I. He allied himself with Gerald Nye, Charles Lindbergh, and the America First Committee, and his statements occasionally contained elements of anti-Semitism. Bass and other internationalists among his old allies broke with Tobey on this issue, and the junior senator was further isolated when Styles Bridges became the champion of preparedness.

After the attack on Pearl Harbor, Tobey supported the war, but his enthusiasm was limited. However, political as well as philosophical considerations led him to a more internationalist position by 1944. Facing an election challenge from the Bass wing of the party as well as from the followers of Bridges and Frank Knox, Tobey sought and received an appointment as delegate to the United Nations Monetary and Financial Conference at Bretton Woods, New Hampshire; he also defended the International Monetary Fund, but he still rejected the "one-worlders," as he described the Wendell Willkie wing of his party. In the days immediately following the Japanese attack on Pearl Harbor, Tobey was criticized by other senators for revealing classified details of the extent of the damage done to the Navy; Tobey argued that the people had the right to know the truth.

In 1948, Tobey called for the establishment of a Jewish state in Palestine.

Tobey joined with Wayne Morse and George Aiken in opposing Robert A. Taft's leadership of the Senate Republicans and supporting President Harry S. Truman on several important votes during the 80th Congress. The illness and death of his wife in 1947 restricted his role in the Marshall Plan debate, but by then he had clearly become an advocate of interdependence. On May 26, 1948, Tobey married Loretta Capell Rabenhorst. After his second wife's death, he married Lillian Crompton in 1952.

The same year Tobey supported the presidential election of Dwight D. Eisenhower. An early opponent of Senator Joseph McCarthy, Tobey was re-elected despite a Bridges-led challenge that accused him of being soft on Communism. Further national recognition came to him through his role in the nationally televised hearings on organized crime, the Kefauver hearings. Tobey was at the peak of his career when he died suddenly in Bethesda, Maryland from a coronary thrombosis at the Bethesda Naval Hospital. He is buried at the Miller Cemetery in Temple, New Hampshire.

Tobey's politics were variously described as liberal, conservative, and progressive. None of these terms is quite adequate. A quiet, non-aggressive nationalism and an unwavering belief in the dignity of the individual capped his values. But his views altered with changing contexts, new definitions of governmental responsibility, and new understanding of the international role of the United States. He was not always on the side of the majority. A New York Times obituary noted that his "independence and sharp tongue made him one of the more colorful figures in American public life."

== See also ==
- List of members of the United States Congress who died in office (1950–1999)

Party political offices
| Preceded by Huntley N. Spaulding | Republican nominee for Governor of New Hampshire; 1928 | Succeeded by John Gilbert Winant |
| Preceded by George H. Moses | Republican nominee for U.S. Senator from New Hampshire (Class 3); 1938, 1944, 1950 | Succeeded by Norris Cotton |
Political offices
| Preceded by Huntley N. Spaulding | Governor of New Hampshire; 1929 – 1931 | Succeeded by John G. Winant |
| Preceded by Wesley Adams | President of the New Hampshire Senate; 1925–1927 | Succeeded by Frank P. Tilton |
U.S. House of Representatives
| Preceded by Edward H. Wason | Member of the U.S. House of Representatives from New Hampshire's 2nd congressional district 1933 – 1939 | Succeeded by Foster W. Stearns |
U.S. Senate
| Preceded by Fred H. Brown | U.S. senator (Class 3) from New Hampshire; 1939 – 1953; Served alongside: Styles Bridges | Succeeded by Robert W. Upton |
| Preceded by John G. Townsend Jr. | Ranking Member of the Senate Banking Committee; 1941–1947 | Succeeded by Robert F. Wagner |
| Preceded by Robert F. Wagner | Chair of the Senate Banking Committee; 1947–1949 | Succeeded by Burnet R. Maybank |
| Preceded by Robert F. Wagner | Ranking Member of the Senate Banking Committee; 1949–1951 | Succeeded by Homer E. Capehart |
| Preceded by Edwin C. Johnson | Ranking Member of the Senate Commerce Committee; 1949–1953 | Succeeded by Edwin C. Johnson |
| Preceded by Edwin C. Johnson | Chair of the Senate Commerce Committee; 1953 | Succeeded by John W. Bricker |
