= 1948 United States Senate election in New Hampshire =

- November 2, 1948
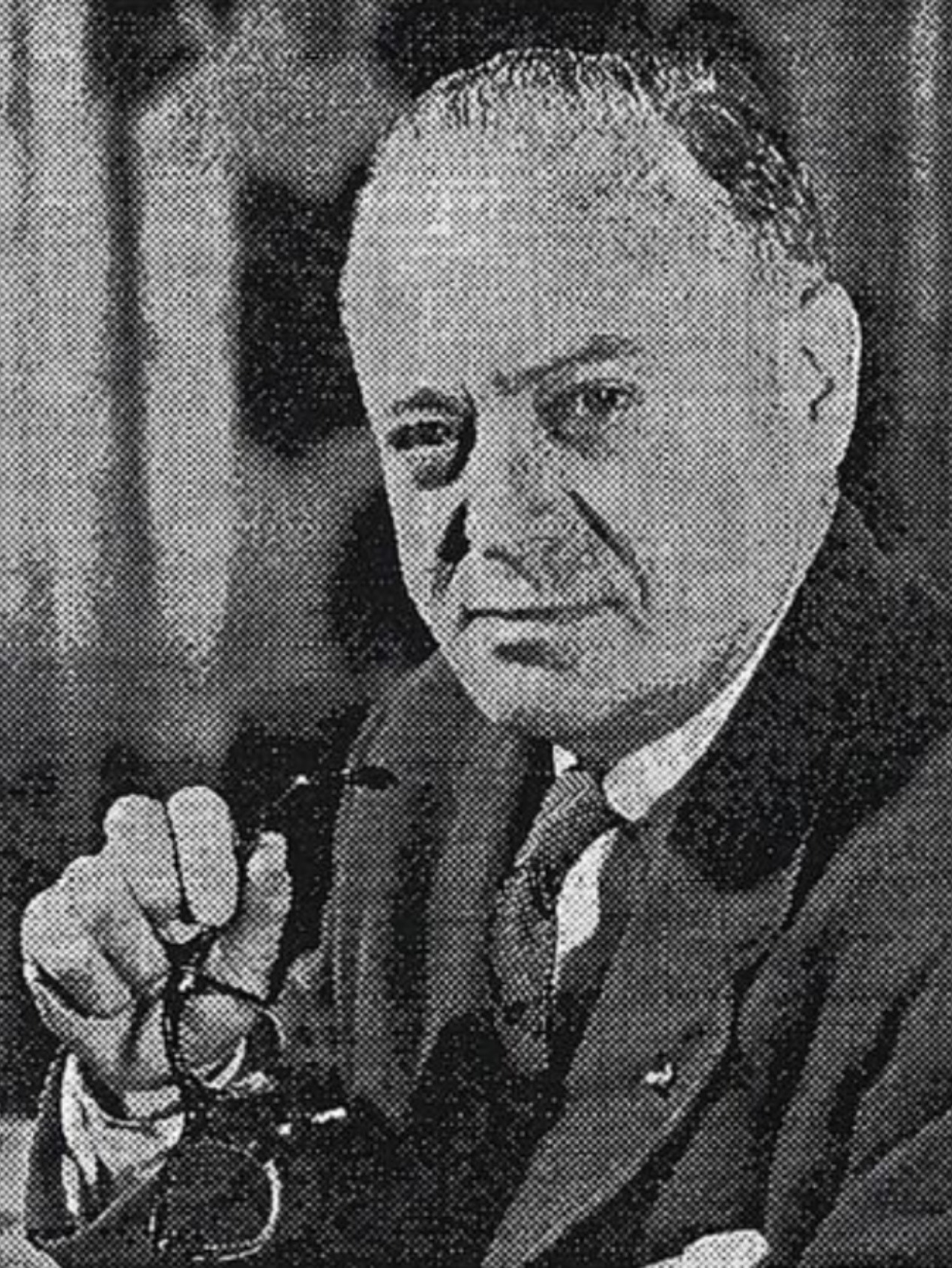

Nominee	Styles Bridges	Alfred E. Fortin
Party	Republican	Democratic
Popular vote	129,600	91,760
Percentage	58.14%	41.17%
- Bridges: 50–60% 60–70% 70–80% 80–90% >90% Fortin: 50–60% 60–70% 70–80%
U.S. senator before election
Styles Bridges
Republican
Elected U.S. Senator
Styles Bridges
Republican

The 1948 United States Senate election in New Hampshire took place on November 2, 1948. Incumbent Republican Senator Styles Bridges won re-election to a third term in office, defeating Democrat Alfred Fortin.

Primary elections were held on September 14, 1948.

== Republican primary ==
=== Candidates ===
- Styles Bridges, incumbent Senator since 1937

=== Results ===
1948 Republican U.S. Senate primary
Party	Candidate	Votes	%
Republican	Styles Bridges (incumbent)	44,616	100.00%
Total votes		44,616	100.00%

== Democratic primary ==
=== Candidates ===
- Alfred E. Fortin
- Joseph A. Millimet

=== Results ===
1948 Democratic U.S. Senate primary
Party	Candidate	Votes	%
Democratic	Alfred E. Fortin	11,563	60.36%
Democratic	Joseph A. Millimet	7,595	39.64%
Total votes		19,158	100.00%

== General election ==
=== Candidates ===
- Styles Bridges, incumbent Senator since 1937 (Republican)
- Alfred E. Fortin (Democratic)

=== Results ===
1948 U.S. Senate election in New Hampshire
Party	Candidate	Votes	%	±%
Republican	Styles Bridges (incumbent)	129,600	58.14%	▲3.53
Democratic	Alfred E. Fortin	91,760	41.17%	▼4.23
Progressive	John G. Rideout	1,538	0.69%	N/A
Total votes		222,898	100.00%	
Republican hold				

== See also ==
- 1948 United States Senate elections
