= 1928 New Hampshire gubernatorial election =

- November 6, 1928
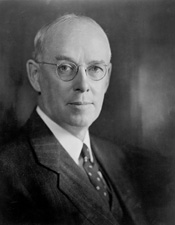

Nominee	Charles W. Tobey	Eaton D. Sargent
Party	Republican	Democratic
Popular vote	108,431	79,798
Percentage	57.50%	42.32%
- Tobey: 50–60% 60–70% 70–80% 80–90% >90% Sargent: 50–60% 60–70% 70–80%
Governor before election
Huntley N. Spaulding
Republican
Elected Governor
Charles W. Tobey
Republican

The 1928 New Hampshire gubernatorial election was held on November 6, 1928. Republican nominee Charles W. Tobey defeated Democratic nominee Eaton D. Sargent with 57.50% of the vote.

== General election ==
=== Candidates ===
Major party candidates

- Charles W. Tobey, Republican
- Eaton D. Sargent, Democratic

Other candidates

- Frank T. Butler, Socialist
- Henry C. Iram, Workers

=== Results ===
1928 New Hampshire gubernatorial election
Party	Candidate	Votes	%	±%
Republican	Charles W. Tobey	108,431	57.50%	
Democratic	Eaton D. Sargent	79,798	42.32%	
Socialist	Frank T. Butler	206	0.11%	
Workers	Henry C. Iram	127	0.07%	
Majority		28,633		
Turnout				
Republican hold		Swing		
