= 1960 United States Senate election in New Hampshire =

- November 8, 1960
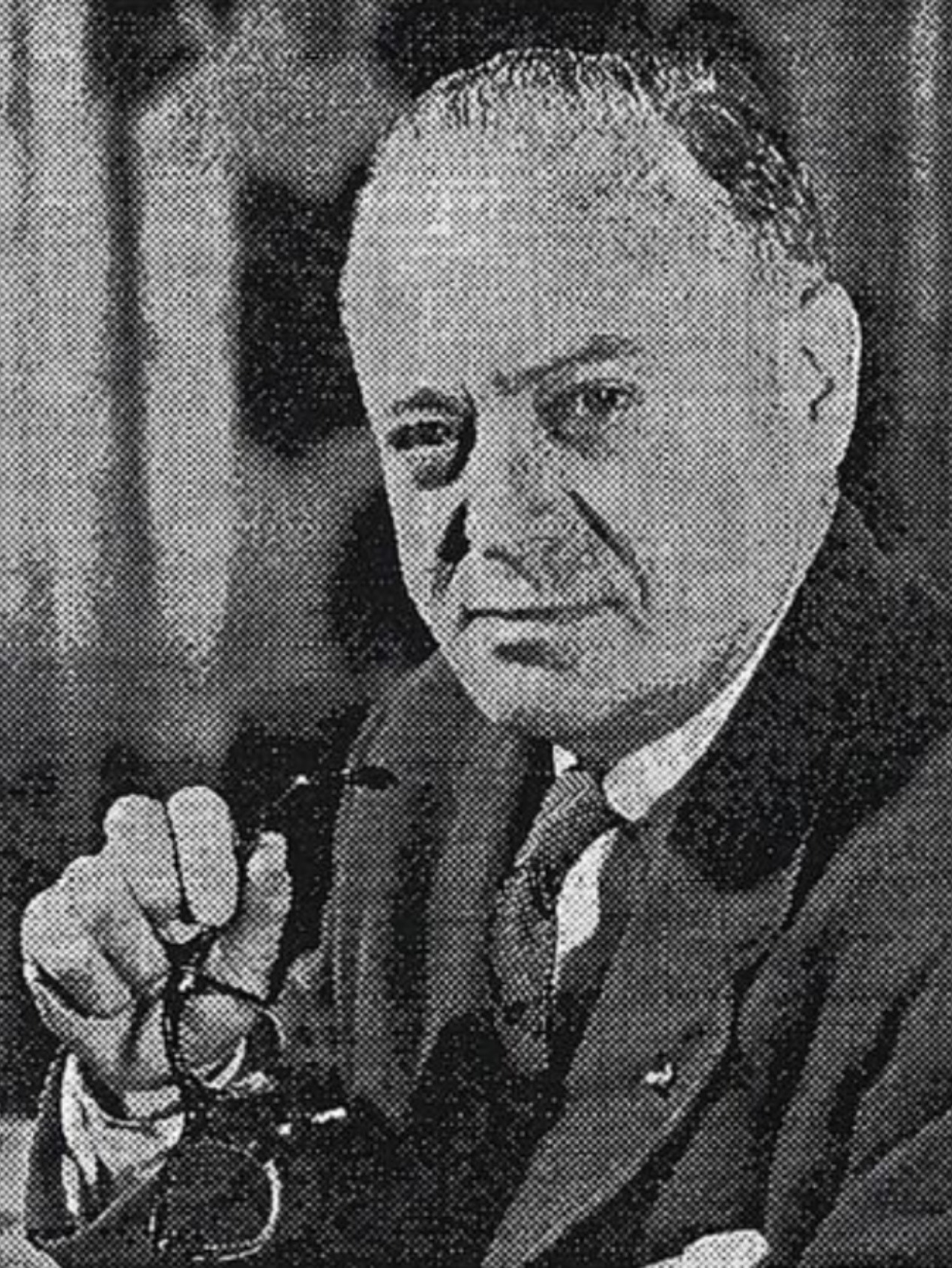

Nominee	Styles Bridges	Herbert W. Hill
Party	Republican	Democratic
Popular vote	173,521	114,024
Percentage	60.35%	39.65%
- Bridges: 50–60% 60–70% 70–80% 80–90% >90% Hill: 50–60% 60–70% 70–80%
U.S. senator before election
Styles Bridges
Republican
Elected U.S. Senator
Styles Bridges
Republican

The 1960 United States Senate election in New Hampshire took place on November 8, 1960. Incumbent Republican Senator Styles Bridges won re-election to a fifth term in office, defeating Democrat Herbert Hill. Bridges died on November 26, 1961, less than one year after his term began.

Primary elections were held on September 13, 1960.

== Republican primary ==
=== Candidates ===
- Styles Bridges, incumbent Senator since 1937
- Albert Levitt

=== Results ===
Republican primary results
Party	Candidate	Votes	%
Republican	Styles Bridges (incumbent)	87,629	92.92%
Republican	Albert Levitt	6,681	7.08%
Total votes		94,310	100.00

== Democratic primary ==
=== Candidates ===
- Herbert W. Hill
- Alphonse Roy, former U.S. Representative from Manchester
- Frank L. Sullivan

=== Results ===
Democratic primary results
Party	Candidate	Votes	%
Democratic	Herbert W. Hill	16,198	40.25%
Democratic	Alphonse Roy	13,782	34.24%
Democratic	Frank L. Sullivan	10,266	25.51%
Total votes		40,246	100.00

== General election ==
=== Candidates ===
- Styles Bridges, incumbent Senator since 1937 (Republican)
- Herbert W. Hill (Democratic)

=== Results ===
1960 United States Senate election in New Hampshire
Party	Candidate	Votes	%	±%
Republican	Styles Bridges (incumbent)	173,521	60.35%	▲0.13
Democratic	Herbert W. Hill	114,024	39.65%	▼0.13
Total votes		287,545	100.00%	
Republican hold				

== See also ==
- 1960 United States Senate elections

== Bibliography ==
- Stark, Robert L., ed. (1961). Manual for the General Court of New Hampshire. Vol. 40. Concord, NH: Department of State, New Hampshire.
