= Sullivan House (Manchester, New Hampshire) =

Historic house in New Hampshire, United States

- U.S. National Register of Historic Places
- Location within New Hampshire Location within the United States
- Location: 1330 Union St., Manchester, New Hampshire
- Coordinates: 43.0211°N 71.4624°W
- Built: 1932–1933
- Architectural style: Colonial Revival
- NRHP reference No.: 100009112
- Added to NRHP: July 6, 2023

The Sullivan House is a historic house at 1330 Union Street in Manchester, New Hampshire. Built in 1932–1933, it is an example of “Little House” architecture. It was added to the National Register of Historic Places in July 2023.

== History ==
The house was built for Priscilla Manning and her fiancé, John L. Sullivan. Sullivan later served as the 49th United States Secretary of the Navy, during 1947–1949. The house was a wedding gift from Manning's maternal grandfather, Frank Pierce Carpenter, founder of the Amoskeag Paper Company.

The house is still owned by the Sullivan family, and contains many of its original furnishings.

== See also ==
- National Register of Historic Places listings in Hillsborough County, New Hampshire
