= John L. Sullivan (United States Navy) =

United States Secretary of the Navy (1899–1982)

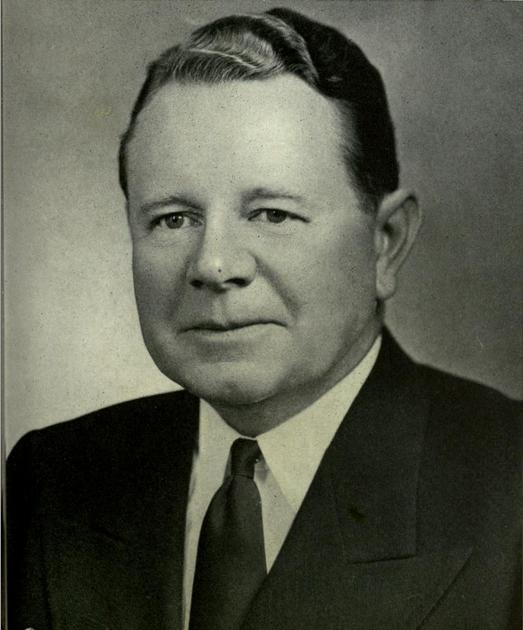

49th United States Secretary of the Navy
- In office September 17, 1947 – May 24, 1949
- President: Harry S. Truman
- Preceded by: James Forrestal
- Succeeded by: Francis P. Matthews

United States Under Secretary of the Navy
- In office June 17, 1946 – September 18, 1947
- President: Harry S. Truman
- Preceded by: Artemus Gates
- Succeeded by: W. John Kenney

Assistant Secretary of the Navy (AIR)
- In office July 5, 1945 – June 17, 1946
- President: Harry S. Truman
- Preceded by: Artemus Gates
- Succeeded by: John N. Brown

Assistant Secretary of the Treasury
- In office January 18, 1940 – November 30, 1944
- President: Franklin D. Roosevelt
- Preceded by: John Wesley Hanes II
- Succeeded by: Harry D. White

Personal details
- Born: John Lawrence Sullivan; June 16, 1899 Manchester, New Hampshire, United States
- Died: August 8, 1982 (aged 83) Exeter, New Hampshire, United States
- Resting place: Arlington National Cemetery
- Party: Democratic
- Spouse: Priscilla Manning (m. 1932)
- Education: Dartmouth College (BA); Harvard University (LLB)

Military service
- Branch/service: United States Navy; Naval Reserve
- Years of service: 1918‍–‍1921
- Battles/wars: World War I

John Lawrence Sullivan (June 16, 1899 – August 8, 1982) was an American lawyer who served in several positions in the US federal government, including as Secretary of the Navy, the first during the administration of Harry S. Truman.

== Early life ==
Sullivan was born in Manchester, New Hampshire on June 16, 1899. He was an alumnus of Dartmouth College. He graduated from Harvard Law School in 1924.

== Career ==
Sullivan served as Assistant Secretary of the Treasury in 1940–44, Assistant Secretary of the Navy (AIR) in 1945–46, notable as the first civilian sworn into Naval office aboard a ship in an active combat zone, and as Under Secretary of the Navy in 1946–47.

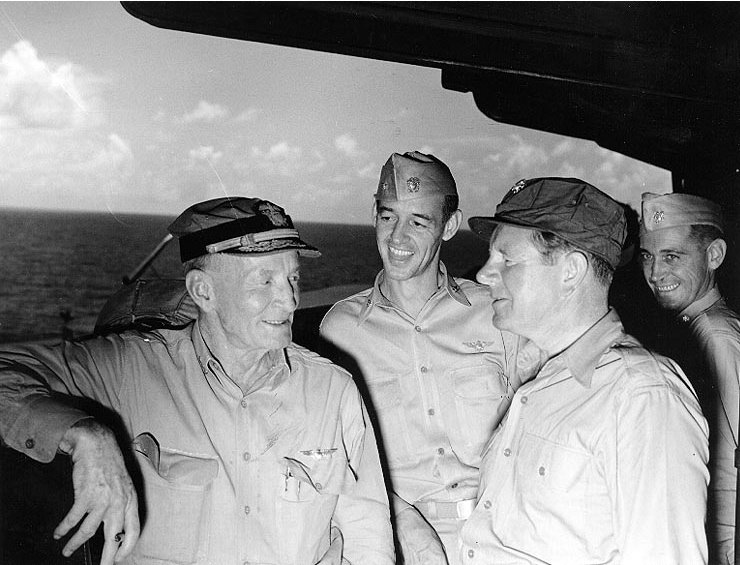
John L. Sullivan (right) and John S. McCain Sr. aboard USS Shangri-La

Sullivan was appointed Secretary of the Navy upon James Forrestal's installation as Secretary of Defense. Sullivan's major contributions to the Navy's future directions include the advent of naval nuclear propulsion. In 1947, then-Captain Hyman G. Rickover went around his chain-of-command and directly to the Chief of Naval Operations, Fleet Admiral Chester W. Nimitz, by chance also a former submariner, to pitch his ideas for creating a nuclear-powered warship. Nimitz immediately understood the potential of nuclear propulsion and recommended the project to Sullivan, whose endorsement to build the world's first nuclear-powered vessel, USS Nautilus (SSN-571), later caused Rickover to state that Sullivan was "the true father of the Nuclear Navy."

In May 1949, Sullivan resigned in protest after the second Secretary of Defense, Louis A. Johnson, canceled the heavy aircraft carrier USS United States (CVA-58). This event was part of an interservice conflict known as the Revolt of the Admirals.

== Personal life ==
Sullivan and his wife had two daughters and a son. Sullivan died on August 8, 1982. He is buried in Arlington National Cemetery.

The house that Sullivan and his wife lived in, constructed in 1932–1933 in Manchester, New Hampshire, was added to the National Register of Historic Places in July 2023.

Party political offices
Preceded by Henri Ledoux	Democratic nominee for Governor of New Hampshire; 1934	Succeeded by Amos Blandin
Preceded by Amos Blandin	Democratic nominee for Governor of New Hampshire; 1938	Succeeded by F. Clyde Keefe
Government offices
Preceded by Artemus Gates	Assistant Secretary of the Navy (AIR); July 5, 1945 – June 17, 1946	Succeeded by John N. Brown
Preceded by Artemus Gates	Under Secretary of the Navy; June 17, 1946 – September 18, 1947	Succeeded by W. John Kenney
Preceded by James V. Forrestal (cabinet)	United States Secretary of the Navy (DoD); September 18, 1947 – May 24, 1949	Succeeded by Francis P. Matthews
