= 1938 New Hampshire gubernatorial election =

- November 8, 1938
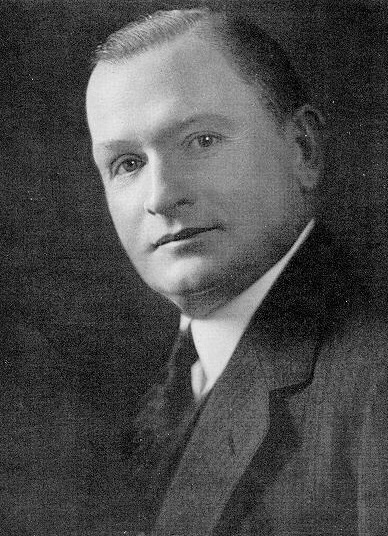

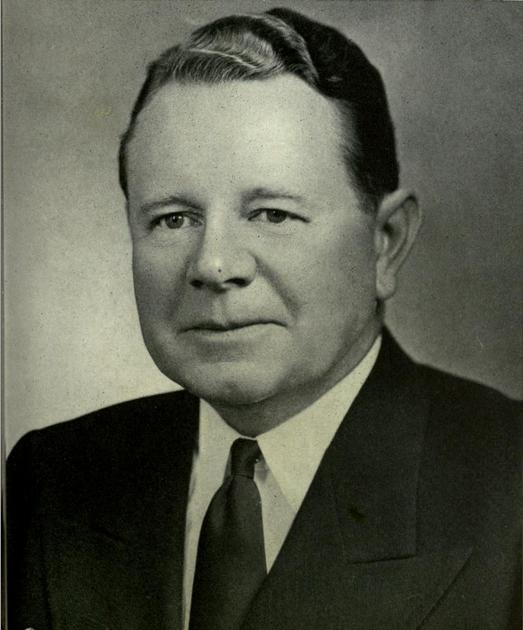
| Nominee | Francis P. Murphy | John L. Sullivan |
| Party | Republican | Democratic |
| Popular vote | 107,841 | 80,847 |
| Percentage | 57.08% | 42.79% |
- Murphy: 50–60% 60–70% 70–80% 80–90% >90% Sullivan: 50–60% 60–70% 70–80% 80–90% Tie: 50%
Governor before election
Francis P. Murphy
Republican
Elected Governor
Francis P. Murphy
Republican

The 1938 New Hampshire gubernatorial election was held on November 8, 1938. Incumbent Republican Francis P. Murphy defeated Democratic nominee John L. Sullivan with 57.08% of the vote.

== Primary elections ==
Primary elections were held on September 13, 1938.

=== Republican primary ===
==== Candidates ====
- Francis P. Murphy, incumbent Governor
- Thomas P. Cheney, New Hampshire Attorney General

==== Results ====
Republican primary results
| Party | Candidate | Votes | % |
|---|---|---|---|
| Republican | Francis P. Murphy (incumbent) | 43,918 | 53.71 |
| Republican | Thomas P. Cheney | 37,852 | 46.29 |
| Total votes | | 81,770 | 100.00 |

== General election ==
=== Candidates ===
Major party candidates

- Francis P. Murphy, Republican
- John L. Sullivan, Democratic

Other candidates

- Elba K. Chase, Communist

=== Results ===
1938 New Hampshire gubernatorial election
| Party | Candidate | Votes | % | ±% |
|---|---|---|---|---|
| Republican | Francis P. Murphy (incumbent) | 107,841 | 57.08% | |
| Democratic | John L. Sullivan | 80,847 | 42.79% | |
| Communist | Elba K. Chase | 237 | 0.13% | |
| Majority | | 26,994 | | |
| Turnout | | | | |
| Republican hold | | Swing | | |
