= Foster W. Stearns =

American politician (1881–1956)

Foster Waterman Stearns
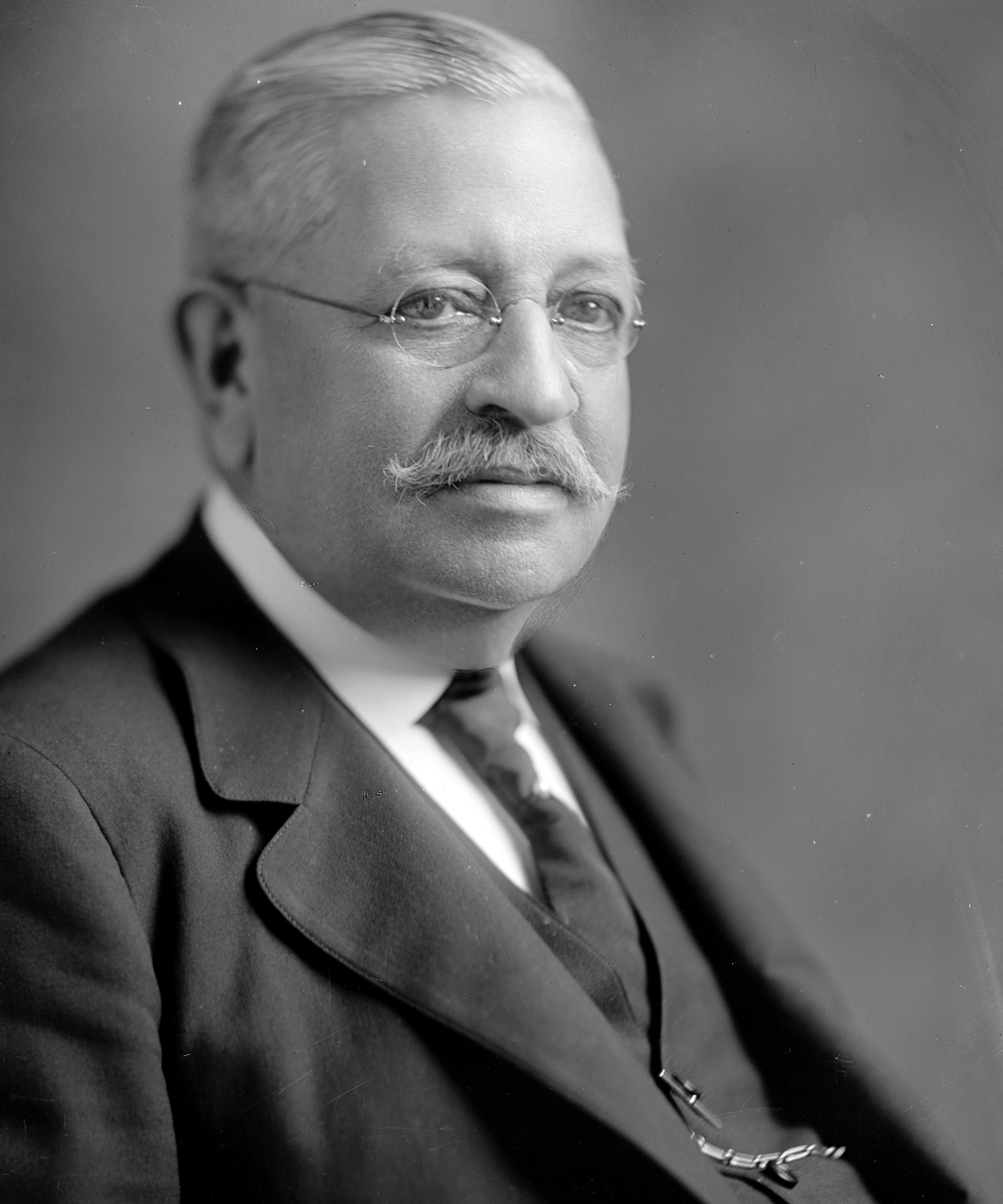
- Harris & Ewing Collection, Library of Congress

Member of the U.S. House of Representatives from New Hampshire's 2nd district
- In office January 3, 1939 – January 3, 1945
- Preceded by: Charles W. Tobey
- Succeeded by: Sherman Adams

Member of the New Hampshire House of Representatives
- In office 1937–1938

Personal details
- Born: July 29, 1881 Hull, Massachusetts
- Died: June 4, 1956 (aged 74) Exeter, New Hampshire
- Resting place: Exeter Cemetery
- Education: Amherst College, 1903; Harvard University, 1906; Boston College, 1915

Military service
- Branch/service: Sixteenth Infantry, First Division, and at the General Headquarters of the American Expeditionary Forces in France
- Years of service: 1917 – August 5, 1919
- Rank: First Lieutenant
- Battles/wars: World War I

Foster Waterman Stearns (July 29, 1881 – June 4, 1956) was a U.S. representative from New Hampshire.

== Biography ==
Born in Hull, Massachusetts, Stearns attended public schools. He graduated from Amherst College in 1903, Harvard University in 1906, and Boston College in 1915. He was Librarian of the Museum of Fine Arts, Boston, from 1913 to 1917, and State Librarian of Massachusetts in 1917.

During the First World War, Stearns served as a first lieutenant with the Sixteenth Infantry, First Division, and at the General Headquarters of the American Expeditionary Forces in France, where he served as assistant military attaché from November 27, 1917, until discharged August 5, 1919. He received the Silver Star and Purple Heart decorations in recognition of his service.

He served in the Department of State, Washington, D.C., in 1920 and 1921, and was third secretary of the American Embassy, attached to the United States High Commission, in Constantinople, 1921–1923. He was second secretary of the American Embassy at Paris in 1923 and 1924.

Returning to the United States, Stearns was Librarian of the College of the Holy Cross in Worcester, Massachusetts, from 1925 to 1930. He moved to Hancock, New Hampshire, in 1927.

He served as member of the New Hampshire House of Representatives in 1937 and 1938, and served as delegate to the Republican National Conventions in 1940 and 1948. He was Regent of the Smithsonian Institution, 1941–1945. In 1941 he became a hereditary member of the New Hampshire Society of the Cincinnati.

Stearns was elected as a Republican to the Seventy-sixth, Seventy-seventh, and Seventy-eighth Congresses (January 3, 1939 – January 3, 1945). He was not a candidate for renomination in 1944, but was an unsuccessful candidate for the Republican nomination for United States Senator.

A confidential 1943 analysis of the House Foreign Affairs Committee by Isaiah Berlin for the British Foreign Office described Stearns as

One of the liberal Republicans who supported the Administration's foreign policy on all major measures, and is reported to be in the Willkie camp, although likely to go along with the Democratic majority on the committee; unlikely to be much of a force, being a kindly old derelict rather than a man of parts. Previously in the State Department and in the American Embassy in Paris. A Catholic; age 62. A mild internationalist.

In 1942, Stearns became a director of the Rumford Printing Co. of Concord, New Hampshire. He moved to Exeter in 1948, where he died June 4, 1956. He was interred in Exeter Cemetery.

U.S. House of Representatives
Preceded by Charles W. Tobey	Member of the U.S. House of Representatives from New Hampshire's 2nd congressional district January 3, 1939 – January 3, 1945	Succeeded by Sherman Adams
