= Francis P. Murphy =

American politician

Francis Parnell Murphy
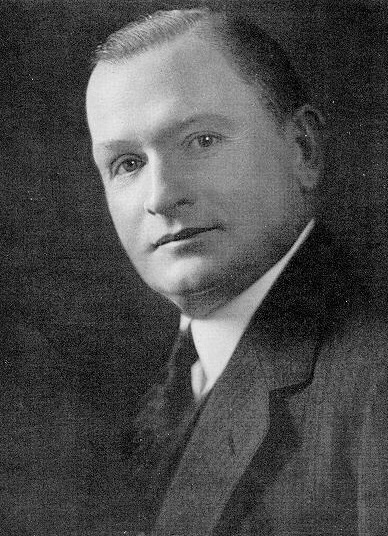

64th Governor of New Hampshire
- In office January 7, 1937 – January 2, 1941
- Preceded by: Styles Bridges
- Succeeded by: Robert O. Blood

Member of the New Hampshire House of Representatives

Personal details
- Born: August 16, 1877 Winchester, New Hampshire, U.S.
- Died: December 19, 1958 (aged 81) Nashua, New Hampshire, U.S.
- Party: Republican (1931–1941); Democratic (1942–1958)

Francis Parnell Murphy (August 16, 1877 – December 19, 1958) was an American manufacturer and politician from Nashua, New Hampshire. He served in the New Hampshire House of Representatives and on the Governor's Council before serving as the 64th governor of New Hampshire from 1937 to 1941.

Murphy supported Roosevelt's New Deal policies and switched to the Democratic Party in an attempt to unseat U.S. Senator Styles Bridges in the 1942 Senate election. He retired from politics to enter the radio broadcasting business and later started the WMUR radio and television stations in Manchester - the station takes its name from Murphy's surname.

A large flood control project in northern New Hampshire at the headwaters of the Connecticut River is named for him, with Murphy Dam impounding Lake Francis. He was also responsible for one of the first ski area aerial tramways in the United States when the Cannon Mountain aerial tramway was built in Franconia Notch.

== Biography ==
Murphy was the fourth of eight children born to Irish immigrant Catholic parents. His father was a tannery worker and a Civil War veteran.

Murphy graduated from high school in the factory town of Hudson, Massachusetts, and secured an entry-level job nailing packing cases for shoes together at a local shoe factory. Murphy worked his way up from this entry position, holding successively more responsible jobs at factories in Newport, Manchester, and Nashua, New Hampshire.

During World War I Murphy was chairman of New Hampshire's Committee on Electric Power Supply, and he was a longtime member of the New Hampshire National Guard. In 1922, Murphy and two partners organized the J.F. McElwain Company, a manufacturer of shoes, and in 1925 Murphy served on Governor John Gilbert Winant's military staff with the rank of major. He was elected to the New Hampshire House of Representatives (1931), and to Governor Winant's Executive Council (1933).

By 1936, Murphy's shoe manufacturing plant had grown to twelve shoe manufacturing plants, and J.F. McElwain Company was the largest employer of labor in New Hampshire. Murphy won the Republican nomination for governor in 1936. Then he won the election in the face of an overwhelming electoral landslide for Franklin D. Roosevelt, the Democrat entering his second of four election victories as president. Even Republican New Hampshire voted (narrowly) for Roosevelt, so much split-ticket voting was necessary for Murphy to win. He was reelected to a second term in 1938.

Governor Murphy supported much New Deal legislation, particularly legislation which supported labor rights. He also had the traditional New Hampshire concern for sound budgeting. In order to ease homeowners' tax burdens, he eliminated the state tax on real estate in favor of a new tax on tobacco products. The State House annex was built to bring all state agencies under one roof and improve efficiency. The state got into tourism with the new Cannon Mountain Tramway, and with new state-owned bathing facilities at Hampton Beach. The New Hampshire State Police were established at this time and a statewide system of probation was set up to make law enforcement more efficient.

In 1940, just before he was due to retire as governor, Murphy entered the broadcasting business. He founded Radio Voice of New Hampshire, Inc. and opened WMUR (AM 610, now WGIR) in 1941. He made one last effort at political life, campaigning against Styles Bridges for the U.S. Senate seat in 1942. When Murphy lost that election (by 15,000 votes), he returned to his business interests. When television came, he set up WMUR-TV in 1954.

== Sources ==
- Melville Corporation-J.F. McElwain Company papers at Baker Library Special Collections, Harvard Business School.

Party political offices
Preceded by Styles Bridges	Republican nominee for Governor of New Hampshire; 1936, 1938	Succeeded by Robert O. Blood
Preceded by William Nathaniel Rogers	Democratic nominee for U.S. Senator from New Hampshire (Class 2); 1942	Succeeded by Alfred E. Fortin
Political offices
Preceded by H. Styles Bridges	Governor of New Hampshire; 1937–1941	Succeeded by Robert O. Blood
