= Styles Bridges =

American politician (1898–1961)

Henry Styles Bridges
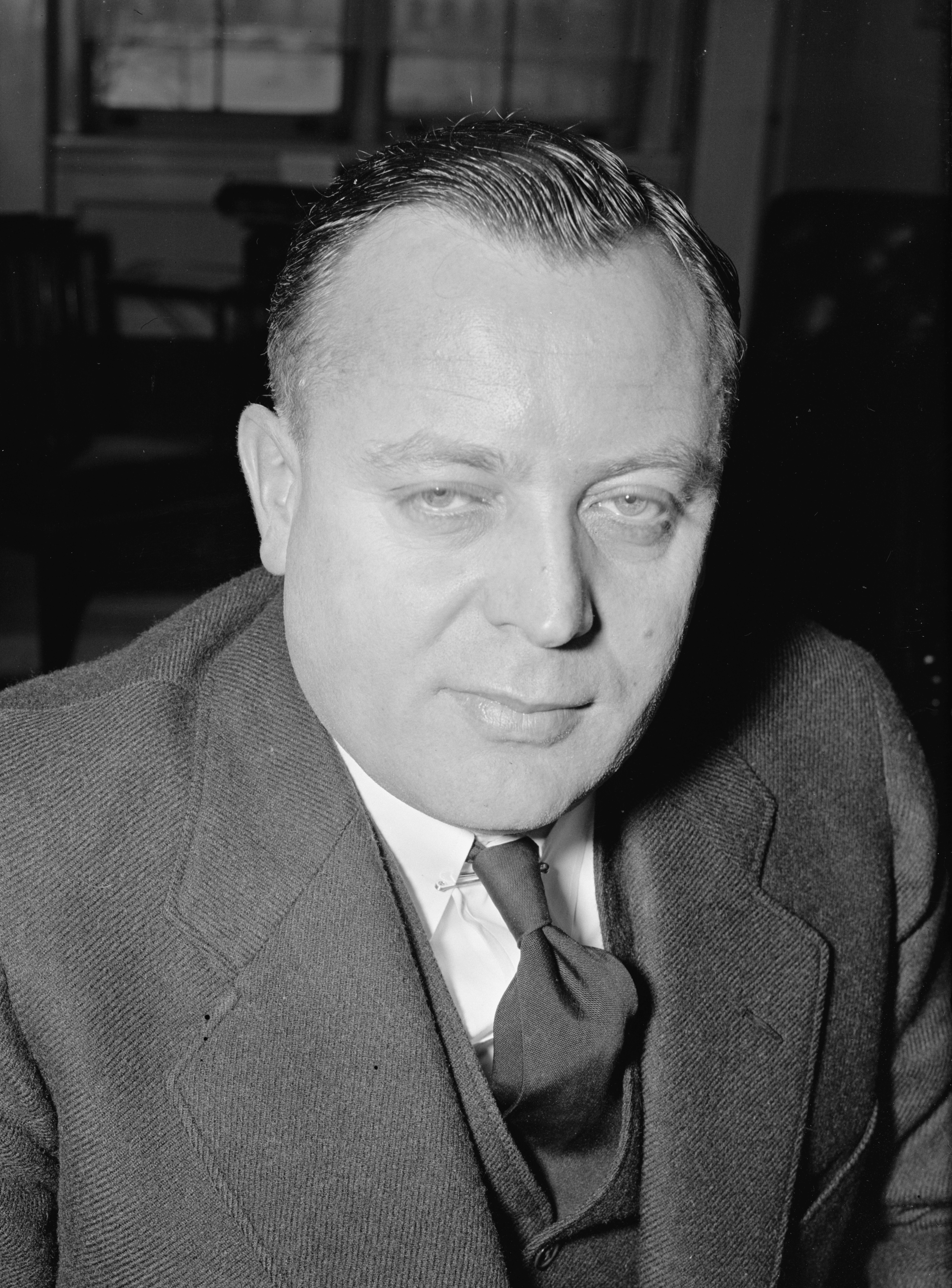
- Bridges in 1939

United States Senator from New Hampshire
- In office January 3, 1937 – November 26, 1961
- Preceded by: Henry W. Keyes
- Succeeded by: Maurice J. Murphy Jr.
Senate positions
Chair of the Senate Republican Policy Committee
In office January 3, 1955 – November 26, 1961
| Leader | William Knowland; Everett Dirksen |
| Preceded by | Homer S. Ferguson |
| Succeeded by | Bourke B. Hickenlooper |
President pro tempore of the United States Senate
In office January 3, 1953 – January 3, 1955
| Preceded by | Kenneth McKellar |
| Succeeded by | Walter F. George |
Senate Minority Leader
In office January 8, 1952 – January 3, 1953
| Whip | Leverett Saltonstall |
| Preceded by | Kenneth S. Wherry |
| Succeeded by | Lyndon B. Johnson |
Leader of the Senate Republican Conference
In office January 8, 1952 – January 3, 1953
| Deputy | Leverett Saltonstall |
| Preceded by | Kenneth S. Wherry |
| Succeeded by | Robert A. Taft |
Chair of the Senate Appropriations Committee
In office January 3, 1953 – January 3, 1955
| Preceded by | Kenneth D. McKellar |
| Succeeded by | Carl Hayden |
In office January 3, 1947 – January 3, 1949
| Preceded by | Kenneth D. McKellar |
| Succeeded by | Kenneth D. McKellar |
Ranking Member of the Senate Appropriations Committee
In office January 3, 1955 – November 26, 1961
| Preceded by | Carl Hayden |
| Succeeded by | Leverett Saltonstall |
In office January 3, 1949 – January 3, 1953
| Preceded by | Kenneth D. McKellar |
| Succeeded by | Carl Hayden |
In office January 3, 1945 – January 3, 1947
| Preceded by | Gerald Nye |
| Succeeded by | Kenneth D. McKellar |

63rd Governor of New Hampshire
- In office January 3, 1935 – January 3, 1937
- Preceded by: John Winant
- Succeeded by: Francis P. Murphy

Personal details
- Born: Henry Styles Bridges; September 9, 1898 Pembroke, Maine, U.S.
- Died: November 26, 1961 (aged 63) Concord, New Hampshire, U.S.
- Party: Republican
- Spouses: Sally Clement (m. 1928; died 1938) Doloris Thauwald (m. 1944)
- Education: University of Maine (BA)

Henry Styles Bridges (September 9, 1898 – November 26, 1961) was an American teacher, editor, and Republican Party politician from Concord, New Hampshire. He served one term as the 63rd governor of New Hampshire before a twenty-four-year career in the United States Senate until his death in 1961.

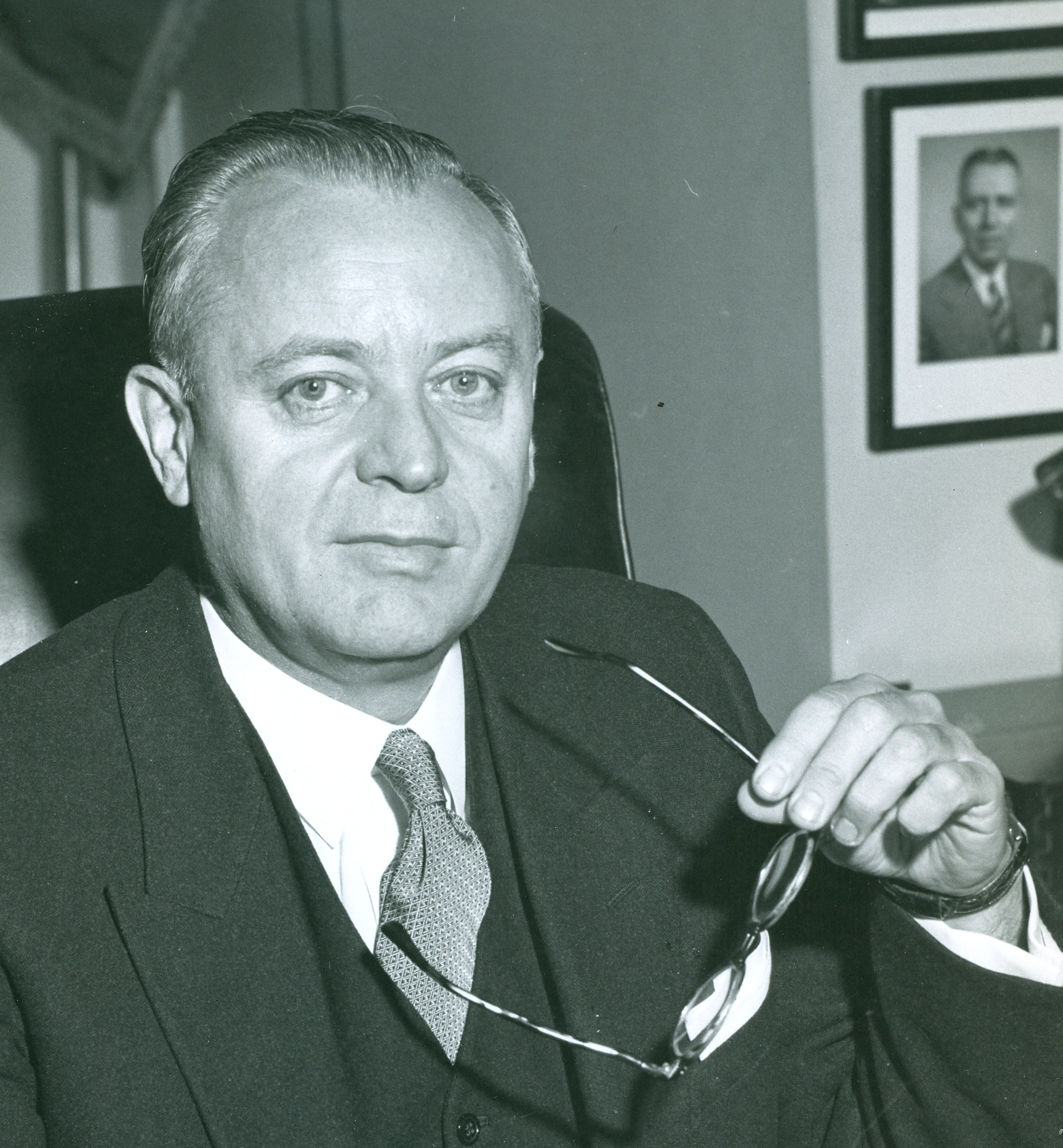

== Early life and career ==
Bridges was born in West Pembroke, Maine, the son of Alina Roxanna (Fisher) and Earle Leopold Bridges. He attended the public schools in Maine. Bridges attended the University of Maine at Orono until 1918. From 1918 he held a variety of jobs, including teaching, newspaper editing, business and state government. He was an instructor at Sanderson Academy, Ashfield, Massachusetts, from 1918 to 1919. He was a member of the extension staff of the University of New Hampshire at Durham from 1921 until 1922. He was the secretary of the New Hampshire Farm Bureau Federation from 1922 until 1923, and the editor of the Granite Monthly Magazine from 1924 until 1926. Meanwhile, He was the director and secretary of the New Hampshire Investment Corporation from 1924 until 1929. He was then a member of the New Hampshire Public Service Commission from 1930 until 1934.

== Political career ==
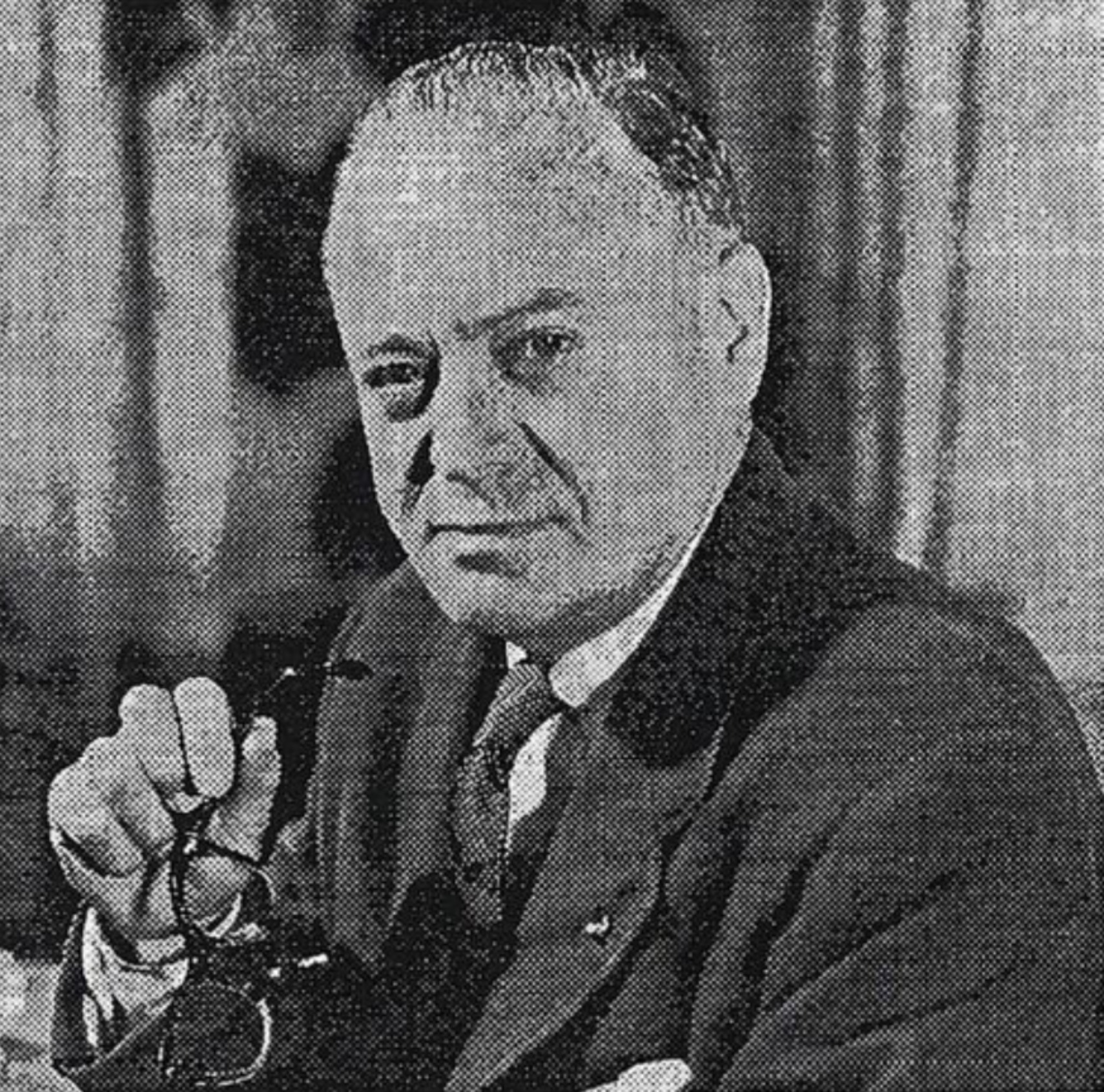
Bridges later in his career

Bridges ran for governor of New Hampshire in 1934 and narrowly won, becoming the nation's youngest governor at the time, according to John Gunther's Inside U.S.A.

Republican presidential nominee Alf Landon considered Bridges as his running mate for the 1936 United States presidential election, but aides pointed out that Democrats could use "Landon Bridges falling down" as a campaign slogan. Bridges was elected to the United States Senate in 1936, and would serve until his death in 1961. In 1937, he retired from the Army Reserve Corps, in which he had served as a lieutenant since 1925. In 1940, he attempted to win the Republican nomination for President; the nomination was eventually won by Wendell Willkie. That same year, Bridges also received two delegates for the Republican vice presidential nomination, which eventually went to Charles L. McNary. Bridges broke his hip on New Year's Eve 1941, and missed several months of the next Senate session.

Bridges was reelected to four subsequent terms in 1942, 1948, 1954, and 1960, but died in office a year into his final term. He became the highest-ranking Republican senator, serving as chairman of the Joint Committee on Foreign Economic Cooperation when the Republicans had control of the Senate from 1947 until 1949, Senate Minority Leader from 1952 until 1953, President pro tempore of the United States Senate when the Republicans had control of it from 1953 until 1955, chairman of the Joint Committee on Inaugural Arrangements for both of the inaugurations of President Dwight Eisenhower, Chairman of the Committee on Appropriations when the Republicans had control of the Senate from 1947 to 1949 and from 1953 to 1955, and Chairman of the Republican Policy Committee from 1954 until his death.

In 1946, Bridges was part of a five-member committee which investigated racist, violent voter suppression in Mississippi incited by the state's demagogic senator Theodore G. Bilbo. The committee, being composed of three Democrats and two Republicans, voted to exonerate Bilbo along party lines. Bridges and his fellow conservative colleague on the committee, Bourke Hickenlooper of Iowa, dissented from the decision on the grounds that Bilbo's actions violated federal laws and abused the First Amendment.

Bridges was on the first Senate Preparedness Investigating Subcommittee of the Armed Services Committee under the chairmanship of Lyndon Johnson. Johnson's biographer Robert Caro argues that Bridges offered Johnson a free hand in running the committee in return for employing two subcommittee staff members who would in fact augment Bridges' staff.

In the Senate, John Gunther wrote, Bridges was "an aggressive reactionary on most issues...and he is pertinaciously engaged in a continual running fight with the CIO, the Roosevelt family and the Union of Soviet Socialist Republics." Bridges voted present on the Civil Rights Act of 1957 and voted in favor of the Civil Rights Act of 1960.

After WWII, when the U.S. government was recruiting Nazi scientists, engineers, and doctors, and Jewish members of the U.S. State Department obstructed the naturalization and political rehabilitation of those individuals, Bridges said on the floor of the Senate on July 18, 1950, that the State Department needed a "first-class cyanide fumigating job" to eliminate resistance to the program, part of an extended "house cleaning" metaphor referencing the common use of cyanide as a fumigant. (Note: quote: Mr. President, the matter of the German scientists was very important. The Senator from Michigan [Mr. FERGUSON], the Senator from Nebraska Mr. WHERRY, and many other Senators who were interested in that situation at the time it was being considered, remember what took place. We sat in commmittee [sic?] and heard a man testify that this individual said he did not care what the program of the President of the United States or of the Cabinet was, that he was going to block the coming into the United States of German scientists. As the result of this attitude on the part of some of our civilians, against the advice of the President and the military authorities, the entry into the United States of a sufficient number of scientists was blocked, and Russia obtained the bulk of them. We obtained only a few.⁋ Let us face the cold, grim, bloody facts. America is in a shooting war. The cold war is over. This may be the opening skirmish of World War III. Americans can honestly face these facts. Americans can be realistic.⁋ Or we can continue to hide our heads in the sand, utter pious hopes for the success of the United Nations under Trygve Lie, who has played the Communist tune, and continue to soften our people with more handouts.⁋ [...] On March 24, 1948, I spoke on the floor of the Senate. I offered a 17-point program to stop Communist aggression. Most of those points are as valid today as they were over 2 years ago.⁋ Today I offer an expanded program based on my original suggestions. I sincerely urge the President of the United States to adopt it as a program for saving the America we know.⁋ [...] Eleventh. Clean out the State Department. This is highly important. The small chance we have to postpone the full-scale encounter with Russia, until we are ready, depends on the skill of our diplomats. For many years our State Department has been infiltrated with men who either have unbelievably poor judgment or whose loyalty is open to serious question. It is not simply a matter of sweeping the front stoop by firing the top officials. It is a matter of a complete housecleaning. President Truman owes it to himself and his country to have the best possible advice on all levels.⁋ The need for the housecleaning can no longer be ignored. In 1939 Stalin ruled 180,000,000 people. Today he rules 800,000,000 people. Our foreign policy of appeasement has resulted in stark disaster. The architects of failure must be swept out of office.⁋ When an Army officer loses a battalion, he is relieved of command, in disgrace. When a naval officer loses his ship or runs it aground in the mud, he is courtmartialed. But when foreign-policy advisers lose a whole continent, they are applauded or even promoted.⁋ Mr. President, I have felt all along that there must be security risks in the State Department. I do not know the extent of these risks or of their disloyalty. Apparently, the Senate is not going to learn much about it as a result of any investigation by this Congress. But obviously, the great bulk of employees in the State Department are loyal Americans. These persons do not pose any security problem.⁋ But I do not like the way the State Department, collectively, thinks. American thinking has never been defensive. American thinking has always been aggressive. Traditionally, our country never has sought merely to keep aggressors quietly appeased. Traditionally, our policy has been to do something about it.⁋ We do not exercise world leadership by “waiting for the dust to settle.” I believe it is essentially un-American to “wait for the situation to clarify.” These phrases mean nothing, except that we do not know what we are doing or what we are trying to do. That is not the way Americans think. Americans are imaginative, forward looking. Americans have ideas. Americans get things done. America should embark on a diplomatic offensive to cut the ground out from under Communist diplomacy.⁋ The State Department needs a real house cleanihg. This is not a job of sweeping the dust under the rug with a whisk broom, or airing out the house by opening the front door and sweeping the front steps. This job calls for yellow soap, a scrubbing brush, and plenty of elbow grease, from the basement to the attic. It should be finished off with a first-class cyanide fumigating job.⁋ We can do this for our fighting men in Korea without spending a cent. It could be accomplished long before effective reinforcements get to Korea. It would give our military morale a terrific boost. Let us clean house, Mr. President.)

=== Association with Joseph McCarthy ===
Bridges was a staunch defender of Senator Joseph McCarthy of Wisconsin, and was one of only 22 senators, all Republicans, who voted against the censure of McCarthy for his "red scare" communist investigations, and for his so-called "lavender scare" tactics aimed at homosexuals in 1954.

=== Blackmail ===
Bridges was also a key collaborator, with fellow Republican senators McCarthy and Herman Welker of Idaho, in the blackmail of Democratic Wyoming senator Lester C. Hunt, harassment that led to Senator Hunt's suicide in his Capitol office on June 19, 1954. Bridges threatened that if he did not immediately retire from the Senate and agree not to seek reelection, Bridges would see that Hunt's son, Lester Hunt Jr., who had been arrested for soliciting an undercover policeman, was prosecuted and that his son's homosexuality would be widely publicized. Bridges also threatened Inspector Roy Blick of the Morals Division of the Washington Police Department with the loss of his job for failing to prosecute Hunt Jr. A Republican, Edward D. Crippa, was appointed by the Republican governor of Wyoming, Clifford Joy Rogers, to fill the vacant seat.

Alex Ross in The New Yorker wrote in 2012 of an event "loosely dramatized in the novel and film Advise & Consent [in which] Senator Lester Hunt, of Wyoming, killed himself after ... Bridges ... threatened to expose Hunt's son as a homosexual".

== Death and burial ==
Bridges died of a heart attack on November 26, 1961, in East Concord and, after a service attended by a thousand people at the State House in Concord, was buried in Pine Grove Cemetery.

He was one of the poorest men ever elected governor and still of modest means when elected to the Senate, yet his widow Doloris told then Vice President Lyndon Johnson that her husband had left her "a million dollars in cash". Bridges willed his East Concord home to the state to serve as a residence for New Hampshire's governors. The New Hampshire Governor's Mansion is known as "Bridges House".

The "Styles Bridges Room" in the U.S. Capitol was named in his memory on March 12, 1981.

Interstate 93 in New Hampshire, from Concord north to the Vermont state line, is named the Styles Bridges Highway. In December 2012, the Boston Globe called for the state to examine Bridges' role in Senator Lester Hunt's death and reconsider whether the state should continue to honor Bridges, or rename the highway.

== See also ==
- List of members of the United States Congress who died in office (1950–1999)

== Additional sources ==
- McDaniel, Rodger. Dying for Joe McCarthy's Sins: The Suicide of Wyoming Senator Lester Hunt (WordsWorth, 2013), ISBN 978-0983027591

Party political offices
| Preceded by John Winant | Republican nominee for Governor of New Hampshire; 1934 | Succeeded by Francis P. Murphy |
| Preceded by Henry W. Keyes | Republican nominee for U.S. Senator from New Hampshire (Class 2); 1936, 1942, 1948, 1954, 1960 | Succeeded by Perkins Bass |
| Preceded by Kenneth S. Wherry | Senate Republican Leader; 1952–1953 | Succeeded by Robert A. Taft |
| Preceded by Homer S. Ferguson | Chair of the Senate Republican Policy Committee; 1955–1961 | Succeeded by Bourke B. Hickenlooper |
Political offices
| Preceded by John Winant | Governor of New Hampshire; 1935–1937 | Succeeded by Francis P. Murphy |
| Preceded by Kenneth McKellar | President pro tempore of the U.S. Senate; 1953–1955 | Succeeded by Walter F. George |
U.S. Senate
| Preceded by Henry W. Keyes | U.S. Senator (Class 2) from New Hampshire; 1937–1961; Served alongside: Fred H. Brown, Charles W. Tobey, Robert W. Upton, Norris Cotton | Succeeded by Maurice J. Murphy Jr. |
| Preceded by Kenneth McKellar | Chair of the Senate Appropriations Committee; 1947–1949 | Succeeded by Kenneth McKellar |
| New office | Chair of the Joint Foreign Economic Cooperation Committee; 1948–1949 | Succeeded by Pat McCarran |
| Preceded by Kenneth McKellar | Ranking Member of the Senate Appropriations Committee; 1949–1953 | Succeeded by Carl Hayden |
| Preceded by Kenneth S. Wherry | Senate Minority Leader; 1952–1953 | Succeeded by Lyndon B. Johnson |
| Preceded by Carl Hayden | Chair of the Joint Inaugural Ceremonies Committee; 1952–1957 | Succeeded by John Sparkman |
| Preceded by Kenneth McKellar | Chair of the Senate Appropriations Committee; 1953–1955 | Succeeded by Carl Hayden |
| Preceded by Carl Hayden | Ranking Member of the Senate Appropriations Committee; 1955–1961 | Succeeded by Leverett Saltonstall |
| New office | Ranking Member of the Senate Space Committee; 1958–1961 | Succeeded by Alexander Wiley |
Honorary titles
| Preceded by Arthur Vandenberg | Most senior Republican United States senator 1951–1961 | Succeeded by Alexander Wiley |
