= 1837 New Hampshire gubernatorial election =

- March 14, 1837
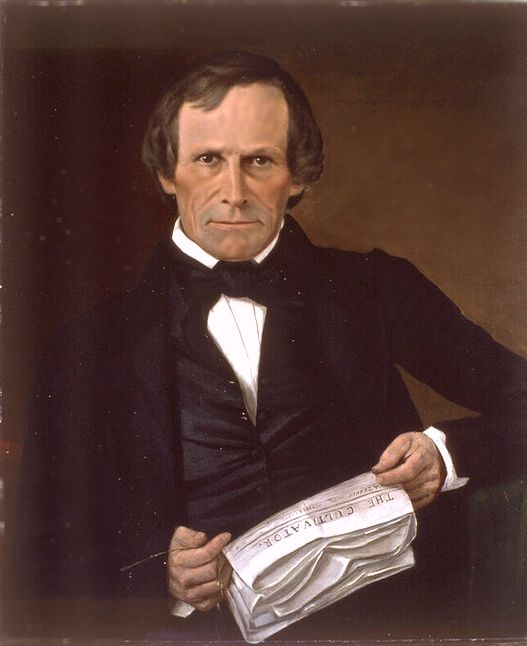
Nominee	Isaac Hill
Party	Democratic
Popular vote	22,361
Percentage	91.15%
- County results Hill: 80–90% >90%
Governor before election
Isaac Hill
Democratic
Elected Governor
Isaac Hill
Democratic

The 1837 New Hampshire gubernatorial election was held on March 14, 1837, in order to elect the governor of New Hampshire. Incumbent Democratic governor Isaac Hill won re-election in a landslide against Whig nominee Joseph Healey and former Federalist Attorney General of New Hampshire George Sullivan in a rematch from the previous election.

== General election ==
On election day, March 14, 1837, Democratic governor Isaac Hill easily won re-election by a margin of 21,205 votes against his foremost opponent Whig nominee Joseph Healey, thereby retaining Democratic control over the office of governor. Hill was sworn in for his second term on June 5, 1837.

=== Results ===
New Hampshire gubernatorial election, 1837
Party	Candidate	Votes	%
Democratic	Isaac Hill (incumbent)	22,361	91.15
Whig	Joseph Healey	557	2.27
	George Sullivan	458	1.87
	Scattering	1,156	4.71
Total votes		24,532	100.00
Democratic hold			
