= List of governors of New Hampshire =

The governor of New Hampshire is the head of government of the U.S. state of New Hampshire and is commander-in-chief of the state's military forces.

The incumbent governor is Republican Kelly Ayotte, who took office on January 9, 2025. The longest-serving governor is John Taylor Gilman, who served as governor for 14 years, from 1794 to 1805 and from 1813 to 1816.

== Governors ==
New Hampshire was one of the original Thirteen Colonies and was admitted as a state on June 21, 1788. Before it declared its independence, New Hampshire was a colony of the Kingdom of Great Britain.

The original 1776 Constitution of New Hampshire did not provide for a chief executive. The office of President was created by the 1784 constitution, and renamed Governor in 1792. Governors served one-year terms until an 1877 amendment increased this to two years. There have never been any term limits for the office, nor is there a lieutenant governor; should the office become vacant, the president of the New Hampshire Senate acts as governor.

Governors of the State of New Hampshire
No.	Governor (Note: The office was named president until 1792.)	Term in office	Party	Election
1	Meshech Weare (1713–1786)	June 15, 1784 – June 8, 1785 (359 days; retired)	No parties	1784
2	John Langdon (1741–1819)	June 8, 1785 – June 9, 1786 (367 days; lost election)	No parties	1785
3	John Sullivan (1740–1795)	June 9, 1786 – June 6, 1788 (729 days; lost election)	No parties	1786
3	John Sullivan (1740–1795)	June 9, 1786 – June 6, 1788 (729 days; lost election)	No parties	1787
2	John Langdon (1741–1819)	June 6, 1788 – January 22, 1789 (231 days; resigned) (Note: Langdon resigned, having been elected to the United States Senate.)	No parties	1788
—	John Pickering (1737–1805)	January 22, 1789 – June 9, 1789 (139 days; lost election)	No parties	President of the Senate acting
3	John Sullivan (1740–1795)	June 9, 1789 – June 8, 1790 (365 days; retired) (Note: Sullivan had been appointed to the United States District Court for the District of New Hampshire on September 26, 1789. Some sources say he resigned as governor near the end of his term due to objections to him being both in the executive and judiciary; but the State Papers indicate he remained in office until the expiration of his term.)	No parties	1789
4	Josiah Bartlett (1729–1795)	June 8, 1790 – June 5, 1794 (1459 days; retired)	No parties	1790
4	Josiah Bartlett (1729–1795)	June 8, 1790 – June 5, 1794 (1459 days; retired)	No parties	1791
4	Josiah Bartlett (1729–1795)	June 8, 1790 – June 5, 1794 (1459 days; retired)	No parties	1792
4	Josiah Bartlett (1729–1795)	June 8, 1790 – June 5, 1794 (1459 days; retired)	No parties	1793
5	John Taylor Gilman (1753–1828)	June 5, 1794 – June 6, 1805 (4019 days; lost election)	Federalist	1794
5	John Taylor Gilman (1753–1828)	June 5, 1794 – June 6, 1805 (4019 days; lost election)	Federalist	1795
5	John Taylor Gilman (1753–1828)	June 5, 1794 – June 6, 1805 (4019 days; lost election)	Federalist	1796
5	John Taylor Gilman (1753–1828)	June 5, 1794 – June 6, 1805 (4019 days; lost election)	Federalist	1797
5	John Taylor Gilman (1753–1828)	June 5, 1794 – June 6, 1805 (4019 days; lost election)	Federalist	1798
5	John Taylor Gilman (1753–1828)	June 5, 1794 – June 6, 1805 (4019 days; lost election)	Federalist	1799
5	John Taylor Gilman (1753–1828)	June 5, 1794 – June 6, 1805 (4019 days; lost election)	Federalist	1800
5	John Taylor Gilman (1753–1828)	June 5, 1794 – June 6, 1805 (4019 days; lost election)	Federalist	1801
5	John Taylor Gilman (1753–1828)	June 5, 1794 – June 6, 1805 (4019 days; lost election)	Federalist	1802
5	John Taylor Gilman (1753–1828)	June 5, 1794 – June 6, 1805 (4019 days; lost election)	Federalist	1803
5	John Taylor Gilman (1753–1828)	June 5, 1794 – June 6, 1805 (4019 days; lost election)	Federalist	1804
2	John Langdon (1741–1819)	June 6, 1805 – June 13, 1809 (1469 days; lost election)	Democratic- Republican	1805
2	John Langdon (1741–1819)	June 6, 1805 – June 13, 1809 (1469 days; lost election)	Democratic- Republican	1806
2	John Langdon (1741–1819)	June 6, 1805 – June 13, 1809 (1469 days; lost election)	Democratic- Republican	1807
2	John Langdon (1741–1819)	June 6, 1805 – June 13, 1809 (1469 days; lost election)	Democratic- Republican	1808
6	Jeremiah Smith (1759–1842)	June 13, 1809 – June 7, 1810 (360 days; lost election)	Federalist	1809
2	John Langdon (1741–1819)	June 7, 1810 – June 6, 1812 (731 days; retired)	Democratic- Republican	1810
2	John Langdon (1741–1819)	June 7, 1810 – June 6, 1812 (731 days; retired)	Democratic- Republican	1811
7	William Plumer (1759–1850)	June 6, 1812 – June 5, 1813 (365 days; lost election)	Democratic- Republican	1812
5	John Taylor Gilman (1753–1828)	June 5, 1813 – June 6, 1816 (1098 days; retired)	Federalist	1813
5	John Taylor Gilman (1753–1828)	June 5, 1813 – June 6, 1816 (1098 days; retired)	Federalist	1814
5	John Taylor Gilman (1753–1828)	June 5, 1813 – June 6, 1816 (1098 days; retired)	Federalist	1815
7	William Plumer (1759–1850)	June 6, 1816 – June 7, 1819 (1097 days; retired)	Democratic- Republican	1816
7	William Plumer (1759–1850)	June 6, 1816 – June 7, 1819 (1097 days; retired)	Democratic- Republican	1817
7	William Plumer (1759–1850)	June 6, 1816 – June 7, 1819 (1097 days; retired)	Democratic- Republican	1818
8	Samuel Bell (1770–1850)	June 7, 1819 – June 5, 1823 (1460 days; retired) (Note: Bell was instead elected to the United States Senate.)	Democratic- Republican	1819
8	Samuel Bell (1770–1850)	June 7, 1819 – June 5, 1823 (1460 days; retired)	Democratic- Republican	1820
8	Samuel Bell (1770–1850)	June 7, 1819 – June 5, 1823 (1460 days; retired)	Democratic- Republican	1821
8	Samuel Bell (1770–1850)	June 7, 1819 – June 5, 1823 (1460 days; retired)	Democratic- Republican	1822
9	Levi Woodbury (1789–1851)	June 5, 1823 – June 4, 1824 (366 days; lost election)	Democratic- Republican (Note: Woodbury was a Democratic-Republican, but was not nominated by the party, so he ran independently.)	1823
10	David L. Morril (1772–1849)	June 4, 1824 – June 8, 1827 (1100 days; lost election)	Democratic- Republican (Note: Sobel & Raimo label Morrill a Democratic-Republican, while other main sources label him an Adams Republican.)	1824
10	David L. Morril (1772–1849)	June 4, 1824 – June 8, 1827 (1100 days; lost election)	Democratic- Republican	1825
10	David L. Morril (1772–1849)	June 4, 1824 – June 8, 1827 (1100 days; lost election)	Democratic- Republican	1826
11	Benjamin Pierce (1757–1839)	June 8, 1827 – June 9, 1828 (368 days; lost election)	Democratic- Republican (Note: Dubin, Kallenbach, and Sobel & Raimo label Pierce a Jackson Democrat, while Glashan labels him a Democratic-Republican.)	1827
12	John Bell (1765–1836)	June 9, 1828 – June 6, 1829 (363 days; lost election)	Democratic- Republican	1828
11	Benjamin Pierce (1757–1839)	June 6, 1829 – June 4, 1830 (364 days; retired)	Democratic	1829
13	Matthew Harvey (1781–1866)	June 4, 1830 – February 28, 1831 (270 days; resigned) (Note: Harvey resigned, having been confirmed to the United States District Court for the District of New Hampshire.)	Democratic	1830
—	Joseph M. Harper (1787–1865)	February 28, 1831 – June 3, 1831 (96 days; retired)	Democratic	President of the Senate acting
14	Samuel Dinsmoor (1766–1835)	June 3, 1831 – June 6, 1834 (1100 days; retired)	Democratic	1831
14	Samuel Dinsmoor (1766–1835)	June 3, 1831 – June 6, 1834 (1100 days; retired)	Democratic	1832
14	Samuel Dinsmoor (1766–1835)	June 3, 1831 – June 6, 1834 (1100 days; retired)	Democratic	1833
15	William Badger (1779–1852)	June 6, 1834 – June 2, 1836 (728 days; retired)	Democratic	1834
15	William Badger (1779–1852)	June 6, 1834 – June 2, 1836 (728 days; retired)	Democratic	1835
16	Isaac Hill (1788–1851)	June 2, 1836 – June 6, 1839 (1100 days; retired)	Democratic	1836
16	Isaac Hill (1788–1851)	June 2, 1836 – June 6, 1839 (1100 days; retired)	Democratic	1837
16	Isaac Hill (1788–1851)	June 2, 1836 – June 6, 1839 (1100 days; retired)	Democratic	1838
17	John Page (1787–1865)	June 6, 1839 – June 2, 1842 (1093 days; retired)	Democratic	1839
17	John Page (1787–1865)	June 6, 1839 – June 2, 1842 (1093 days; retired)	Democratic	1840
17	John Page (1787–1865)	June 6, 1839 – June 2, 1842 (1093 days; retired)	Democratic	1841
18	Henry Hubbard (1784–1857)	June 2, 1842 – June 6, 1844 (736 days; retired)	Democratic	1842
18	Henry Hubbard (1784–1857)	June 2, 1842 – June 6, 1844 (736 days; retired)	Democratic	1843
19	John Hardy Steele (1789–1865)	June 6, 1844 – June 5, 1846 (730 days; retired)	Democratic	1844
19	John Hardy Steele (1789–1865)	June 6, 1844 – June 5, 1846 (730 days; retired)	Democratic	1845
20	Anthony Colby (1792–1873)	June 5, 1846 – June 3, 1847 (364 days; lost election)	Whig	1846
21	Jared W. Williams (1796–1864)	June 3, 1847 – June 7, 1849 (736 days; retired)	Democratic	1847
21	Jared W. Williams (1796–1864)	June 3, 1847 – June 7, 1849 (736 days; retired)	Democratic	1848
22	Samuel Dinsmoor Jr. (1799–1869)	June 7, 1849 – June 3, 1852 (1093 days; retired)	Democratic	1849
22	Samuel Dinsmoor Jr. (1799–1869)	June 7, 1849 – June 3, 1852 (1093 days; retired)	Democratic	1850
22	Samuel Dinsmoor Jr. (1799–1869)	June 7, 1849 – June 3, 1852 (1093 days; retired)	Democratic	1851
23	Noah Martin (1801–1863)	June 3, 1852 – June 8, 1854 (736 days; retired)	Democratic	1852
23	Noah Martin (1801–1863)	June 3, 1852 – June 8, 1854 (736 days; retired)	Democratic	1853
24	Nathaniel B. Baker (1818–1876)	June 8, 1854 – June 7, 1855 (365 days; lost election)	Democratic	1854
25	Ralph Metcalf (1796–1858)	June 7, 1855 – June 4, 1857 (729 days; retired)	Know Nothing	1855
25	Ralph Metcalf (1796–1858)	June 7, 1855 – June 4, 1857 (729 days; retired)	Know Nothing	1856
26	William Haile (1807–1876)	June 4, 1857 – June 2, 1859 (729 days; retired)	Republican	1857
26	William Haile (1807–1876)	June 4, 1857 – June 2, 1859 (729 days; retired)	Republican	1858
27	Ichabod Goodwin (1794–1882)	June 2, 1859 – June 6, 1861 (736 days; lost nomination)	Republican	1859
27	Ichabod Goodwin (1794–1882)	June 2, 1859 – June 6, 1861 (736 days; lost nomination)	Republican	1860
28	Nathaniel S. Berry (1796–1894)	June 6, 1861 – June 4, 1863 (729 days; retired)	Republican	1861
28	Nathaniel S. Berry (1796–1894)	June 6, 1861 – June 4, 1863 (729 days; retired)	Republican	1862
29	Joseph A. Gilmore (1811–1867)	June 4, 1863 – June 8, 1865 (736 days; retired)	Republican	1863
29	Joseph A. Gilmore (1811–1867)	June 4, 1863 – June 8, 1865 (736 days; retired)	Republican	1864
30	Frederick Smyth (1819–1899)	June 8, 1865 – June 6, 1867 (729 days; retired)	Republican	1865
30	Frederick Smyth (1819–1899)	June 8, 1865 – June 6, 1867 (729 days; retired)	Republican	1866
31	Walter Harriman (1817–1884)	June 6, 1867 – June 3, 1869 (729 days; retired)	Republican	1867
31	Walter Harriman (1817–1884)	June 6, 1867 – June 3, 1869 (729 days; retired)	Republican	1868
32	Onslow Stearns (1810–1878)	June 3, 1869 – June 14, 1871 (742 days; retired)	Republican	1869
32	Onslow Stearns (1810–1878)	June 3, 1869 – June 14, 1871 (742 days; retired)	Republican	1870
33	James A. Weston (1827–1895)	June 14, 1871 – June 6, 1872 (359 days; lost election)	Democratic	1871
34	Ezekiel A. Straw (1819–1882)	June 6, 1872 – June 4, 1874 (729 days; retired)	Republican	1872
34	Ezekiel A. Straw (1819–1882)	June 6, 1872 – June 4, 1874 (729 days; retired)	Republican	1873
33	James A. Weston (1827–1895)	June 4, 1874 – June 10, 1875 (372 days; retired)	Democratic	1874
35	Person Colby Cheney (1828–1901)	June 10, 1875 – June 7, 1877 (729 days; retired)	Republican	1875
35	Person Colby Cheney (1828–1901)	June 10, 1875 – June 7, 1877 (729 days; retired)	Republican	1876
36	Benjamin F. Prescott (1833–1895)	June 7, 1877 – June 5, 1879 (729 days; retired)	Republican	1877
36	Benjamin F. Prescott (1833–1895)	June 7, 1877 – June 5, 1879 (729 days; retired)	Republican	^{Mar.}1878
37	Nathaniel Head (1828–1883)	June 5, 1879 – June 2, 1881 (729 days; retired)	Republican	^{Nov.}1878
38	Charles H. Bell (1823–1893)	June 2, 1881 – June 7, 1883 (736 days; retired)	Republican	1880
39	Samuel W. Hale (1823–1891)	June 7, 1883 – June 4, 1885 (729 days; retired)	Republican	1882
40	Moody Currier (1806–1898)	June 4, 1885 – June 2, 1887 (729 days; retired)	Republican	1884
41	Charles H. Sawyer (1840–1908)	June 2, 1887 – June 6, 1889 (736 days; retired)	Republican	1886
42	David H. Goodell (Note: Goodell was seriously ill in 1890, and President of the Senate David A. Taggart acted as governor from April 22 to July 1.) (1834–1915)	June 6, 1889 – January 8, 1891 (582 days; retired)	Republican	1888
43	Hiram A. Tuttle (1837–1911)	January 8, 1891 – January 5, 1893 (729 days; retired)	Republican	1890
44	John Butler Smith (1838–1914)	January 5, 1893 – January 3, 1895 (729 days; retired)	Republican	1892
45	Charles A. Busiel (1842–1901)	January 3, 1895 – January 7, 1897 (736 days; retired)	Republican	1894
46	George A. Ramsdell (1834–1900)	January 7, 1897 – January 5, 1899 (729 days; retired)	Republican	1896
47	Frank W. Rollins (1860–1915)	January 5, 1899 – January 3, 1901 (729 days; retired)	Republican	1898
48	Chester B. Jordan (1839–1914)	January 3, 1901 – January 8, 1903 (736 days; retired)	Republican	1900
49	Nahum J. Bachelder (1854–1934)	January 8, 1903 – January 5, 1905 (729 days; retired)	Republican	1902
50	John McLane (1852–1911)	January 5, 1905 – January 3, 1907 (729 days; retired)	Republican	1904
51	Charles M. Floyd (1861–1923)	January 3, 1907 – January 7, 1909 (736 days; retired)	Republican	1906
52	Henry B. Quinby (1846–1924)	January 7, 1909 – January 5, 1911 (729 days; retired)	Republican	1908
53	Robert P. Bass (1873–1960)	January 5, 1911 – January 2, 1913 (729 days; retired)	Republican	1910
54	Samuel D. Felker (1859–1932)	January 2, 1913 – January 7, 1915 (736 days; retired)	Democratic	1912
55	Rolland H. Spaulding (1873–1942)	January 7, 1915 – January 4, 1917 (729 days; retired)	Republican	1914
56	Henry W. Keyes (1863–1938)	January 4, 1917 – January 2, 1919 (729 days; retired) (Note: Keyes was instead elected to the United States Senate.)	Republican	1916
57	John H. Bartlett (1869–1952)	January 2, 1919 – January 6, 1921 (736 days; retired)	Republican	1918
58	Albert O. Brown (1852–1937)	January 6, 1921 – January 4, 1923 (729 days; retired)	Republican	1920
59	Fred H. Brown (1879–1955)	January 4, 1923 – January 8, 1925 (736 days; lost election)	Democratic	1922
60	John Gilbert Winant (1889–1947)	January 8, 1925 – January 6, 1927 (729 days; lost nomination)	Republican	1924
61	Huntley N. Spaulding (1869–1955)	January 6, 1927 – January 3, 1929 (729 days; retired)	Republican	1926
62	Charles W. Tobey (1880–1953)	January 3, 1929 – January 8, 1931 (736 days; retired)	Republican	1928
60	John Gilbert Winant (1889–1947)	January 8, 1931 – January 3, 1935 (1457 days; retired)	Republican	1930
60	John Gilbert Winant (1889–1947)	January 8, 1931 – January 3, 1935 (1457 days; retired)	Republican	1932
63	Styles Bridges (1898–1961)	January 3, 1935 – January 7, 1937 (736 days; retired) (Note: Bridges was instead elected to the United States Senate.)	Republican	1934
64	Francis P. Murphy (1877–1958)	January 7, 1937 – January 2, 1941 (1457 days; retired)	Republican	1936
64	Francis P. Murphy (1877–1958)	January 7, 1937 – January 2, 1941 (1457 days; retired)	Republican	1938
65	Robert O. Blood (1887–1975)	January 2, 1941 – January 4, 1945 (1464 days; lost nomination)	Republican	1940
65	Robert O. Blood (1887–1975)	January 2, 1941 – January 4, 1945 (1464 days; lost nomination)	Republican	1942
66	Charles M. Dale (1893–1978)	January 4, 1945 – January 6, 1949 (1464 days; retired)	Republican	1944
66	Charles M. Dale (1893–1978)	January 4, 1945 – January 6, 1949 (1464 days; retired)	Republican	1946
67	Sherman Adams (1899–1986)	January 6, 1949 – January 8, 1953 (1464 days; retired)	Republican	1948
67	Sherman Adams (1899–1986)	January 6, 1949 – January 8, 1953 (1464 days; retired)	Republican	1950
68	Hugh Gregg (1917–2003)	January 8, 1953 – January 6, 1955 (729 days; retired)	Republican	1952
69	Lane Dwinell (1906–1997)	January 6, 1955 – January 8, 1959 (1464 days; retired)	Republican	1954
69	Lane Dwinell (1906–1997)	January 6, 1955 – January 8, 1959 (1464 days; retired)	Republican	1956
70	Wesley Powell (1915–1981)	January 8, 1959 – January 5, 1963 (1459 days; lost nomination) (Note: Powell lost the Republican nomination to John P. Pillsbury.)	Republican	1958
70	Wesley Powell (1915–1981)	January 8, 1959 – January 5, 1963 (1459 days; lost nomination)	Republican	1960
71	John W. King (1916–1996)	January 5, 1963 – January 2, 1969 (2190 days; retired) (Note: King instead ran unsuccessfully for the United States Senate.)	Democratic	1962
71	John W. King (1916–1996)	January 5, 1963 – January 2, 1969 (2190 days; retired)	Democratic	1964
71	John W. King (1916–1996)	January 5, 1963 – January 2, 1969 (2190 days; retired)	Democratic	1966
72	Walter R. Peterson Jr. (1922–2011)	January 2, 1969 – January 4, 1973 (1464 days; lost nomination)	Republican	1968
72	Walter R. Peterson Jr. (1922–2011)	January 2, 1969 – January 4, 1973 (1464 days; lost nomination)	Republican	1970
73	Meldrim Thomson (1912–2001)	January 4, 1973 – January 4, 1979 (2192 days; lost election)	Republican	1972
73	Meldrim Thomson (1912–2001)	January 4, 1973 – January 4, 1979 (2192 days; lost election)	Republican	1974
73	Meldrim Thomson (1912–2001)	January 4, 1973 – January 4, 1979 (2192 days; lost election)	Republican	1976
74	Hugh Gallen (1924–1982)	January 4, 1979 – December 29, 1982 (1456 days; died in office) (Note: Gallen lost the 1982 election before he died.)	Democratic	1978
74	Hugh Gallen (1924–1982)	January 4, 1979 – December 29, 1982 (1456 days; died in office)	Democratic	1980
—	Vesta M. Roy (1925–2002)	December 29, 1982 – January 6, 1983 (9 days; retired)	Republican	President of the Senate acting
75	John H. Sununu (b. 1939)	January 6, 1983 – January 5, 1989 (2192 days; retired)	Republican	1982
75	John H. Sununu (b. 1939)	January 6, 1983 – January 5, 1989 (2192 days; retired)	Republican	1984
75	John H. Sununu (b. 1939)	January 6, 1983 – January 5, 1989 (2192 days; retired)	Republican	1986
76	Judd Gregg (b. 1947)	January 5, 1989 – January 2, 1993 (1459 days; resigned) (Note: Gregg resigned, having been elected to the United States Senate.)	Republican	1988
76	Judd Gregg (b. 1947)	January 5, 1989 – January 2, 1993 (1459 days; resigned)	Republican	1990
—	Ralph D. Hough (b. 1943)	January 2, 1993 – January 7, 1993 (6 days; retired)	Republican	President of the Senate acting
77	Steve Merrill (1946–2020)	January 7, 1993 – January 9, 1997 (1464 days; retired)	Republican	1992
77	Steve Merrill (1946–2020)	January 7, 1993 – January 9, 1997 (1464 days; retired)	Republican	1994
78	Jeanne Shaheen (b. 1947)	January 9, 1997 – January 9, 2003 (2192 days; retired) (Note: Shaheen instead ran unsuccessfully for the United States Senate.)	Democratic	1996
78	Jeanne Shaheen (b. 1947)	January 9, 1997 – January 9, 2003 (2192 days; retired)	Democratic	1998
78	Jeanne Shaheen (b. 1947)	January 9, 1997 – January 9, 2003 (2192 days; retired)	Democratic	2000
79	Craig Benson (b. 1954)	January 9, 2003 – January 6, 2005 (729 days; lost election)	Republican	2002
80	John Lynch (b. 1952)	January 6, 2005 – January 3, 2013 (2920 days; retired)	Democratic	2004
80	John Lynch (b. 1952)	January 6, 2005 – January 3, 2013 (2920 days; retired)	Democratic	2006
80	John Lynch (b. 1952)	January 6, 2005 – January 3, 2013 (2920 days; retired)	Democratic	2008
80	John Lynch (b. 1952)	January 6, 2005 – January 3, 2013 (2920 days; retired)	Democratic	2010
81	Maggie Hassan (b. 1958)	January 3, 2013 – January 2, 2017 (1461 days; resigned) (Note: Hassan resigned, having been elected to the United States Senate.)	Democratic	2012
81	Maggie Hassan (b. 1958)	January 3, 2013 – January 2, 2017 (1461 days; resigned)	Democratic	2014
—	Chuck Morse (b. 1960)	January 3, 2017 (Note: Morse was sworn in at 12:01am on January 3.) – January 5, 2017 (3 days; retired)	Republican	President of the Senate acting
82	Chris Sununu (b. 1974)	January 5, 2017 – January 9, 2025 (2927 days; retired)	Republican	2016
82	Chris Sununu (b. 1974)	January 5, 2017 – January 9, 2025 (2927 days; retired)	Republican	2018
82	Chris Sununu (b. 1974)	January 5, 2017 – January 9, 2025 (2927 days; retired)	Republican	2020
82	Chris Sununu (b. 1974)	January 5, 2017 – January 9, 2025 (2927 days; retired)	Republican	2022
83	Kelly Ayotte (b. 1968)	January 9, 2025 – Incumbent (Note: Ayotte's term will expire in January 2027; she was elected to a second term on November 3, 2026.) (in office 683 days)	Republican	2024
83	Kelly Ayotte (b. 1968)	January 9, 2025 – Incumbent (in office 683 days)	Republican	2026

== See also ==
- Gubernatorial lines of succession in the United States § New Hampshire
- List of presidents of the New Hampshire Senate
- List of colonial governors of New Hampshire
- List of New Hampshire General Courts

== Sources ==
- "Former New Hampshire Governors". National Governors Association.
- "New Hampshire Constitution". State Democracy Research Initiative. University of Wisconsin Law School.
- Dubin, Michael J. (2003). United States Gubernatorial Elections, 1776–1860: The Official Results by State and County. McFarland. ISBN 0-7864-1439-1 – via Internet Archive.
- Glashan, Roy R. (1979). American Governors and Gubernatorial Elections, 1775-1978. Meckler Books. ISBN 0-7201-1511-6 – via Internet Archive.
- Kallenbach, Joseph E.; Kallenbach, Jessamine S. (1977). American State Governors, 1776-1976. Oceana Publications. ISBN 978-0-379-00665-0 – via Internet Archive.
- Mullaney, Marie Marmo (1994). Biographical Directory of the Governors of the United States, 1988–1994. Greenwood Publishing Group. ISBN 0-313-28312-5 – via Internet Archive.
- Sobel, Robert; Raimo, John (1978). Biographical Directory of the Governors of the United States, 1789-1978. Vol. 3. Meckler Books. ISBN 0-930466-01-2 – via Internet Archive.
- Thorpe, Francis Newton, ed. (1909). The Federal and State Constitutions, Colonial Charters, and Other Organic Laws of the States, Territories, and Colonies Now or Heretofore Forming the United States of America. Vol. 4. United States Government Publishing Office – via Internet Archive.
- Batchellor, Albert Stillman, ed. (1891). Early state papers of New Hampshire, including the Constitution of 1784, journals of the Senate and House of Representatives, and records of the President and council from June 1784 to June 1787 with an appendix. Vol. XX – via University of New Hampshire Scholars Repository.
- Batchellor, Albert Stillman, ed. (1892). Early state papers of New Hampshire, journals of the Senate and House of Representatives and records of the President and council from June, 1787 to June, 1790. Vol. XXI – via University of New Hampshire Scholars Repository.
- Stevens, Benjamin Franklin, ed. (1893). Early state papers of New Hampshire, including the Constitution of 1784, journals of the Senate and House of Representatives, and records of the President and council from June, 1790 to June, 1793 with an appendix. Vol. XXII – via University of New Hampshire Scholars Repository.
