= 1873 New Hampshire gubernatorial election =

- March 11, 1873
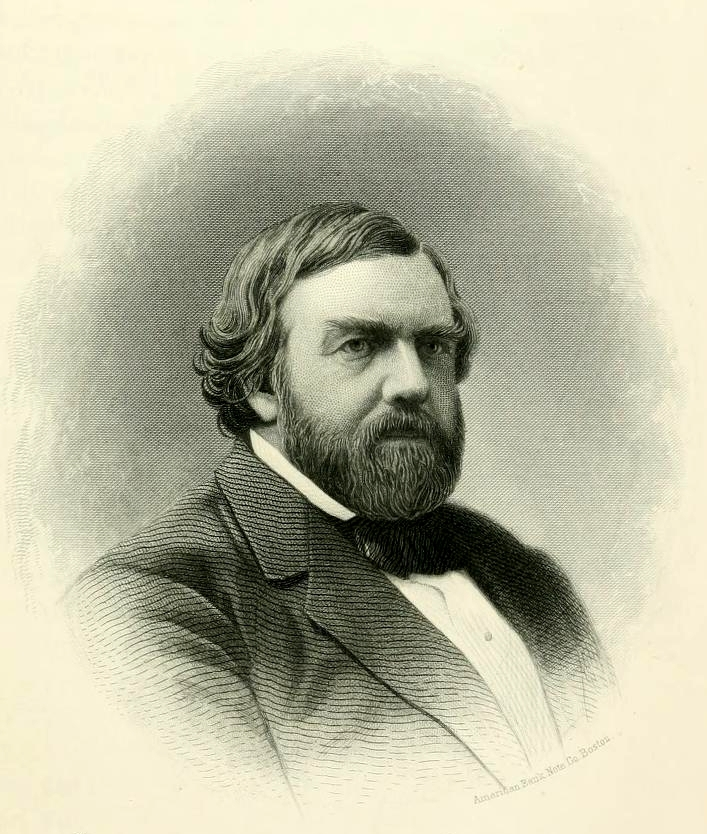

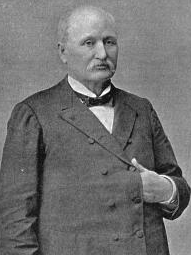
Nominee	Ezekiel A. Straw	James A. Weston
Party	Republican	Democratic
Popular vote	34,023	32,016
Percentage	50.16%	47.20%
- County results Straw: 50–60% Weston: 40–50% 50–60%
Governor before election
Ezekiel A. Straw
Republican
Elected Governor
Ezekiel A. Straw
Republican

The 1873 New Hampshire gubernatorial election was held on March 11, 1873, in order to elect the governor of New Hampshire. Incumbent Republican governor Ezekiel A. Straw won re-election against former Democratic governor James A. Weston, Temperance nominee John Blackmer and Labor Reform Party nominee Samuel K. Mason in a rematch of the previous election.

== General election ==
On election day, March 11, 1873, incumbent Republican governor Ezekiel A. Straw won re-election by a margin of 2,007 votes against his foremost opponent former Democratic governor James A. Weston, thereby retaining Republican control over the office of governor. Straw was sworn in for his second term on June 3, 1873.

=== Results ===
New Hampshire gubernatorial election, 1873
Party	Candidate	Votes	%
Republican	Ezekiel A. Straw (incumbent)	34,023	50.16
Democratic	James A. Weston	32,016	47.20
Prohibition	John Blackmer	1,098	1.62
Labor Reform Party	Samuel K. Mason	687	1.01
	Scattering	8	0.01
Total votes		67,832	100.00
Republican hold			
