= 1877 New Hampshire gubernatorial election =

- March 13, 1877
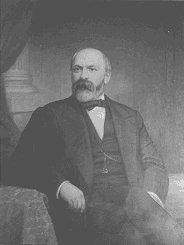

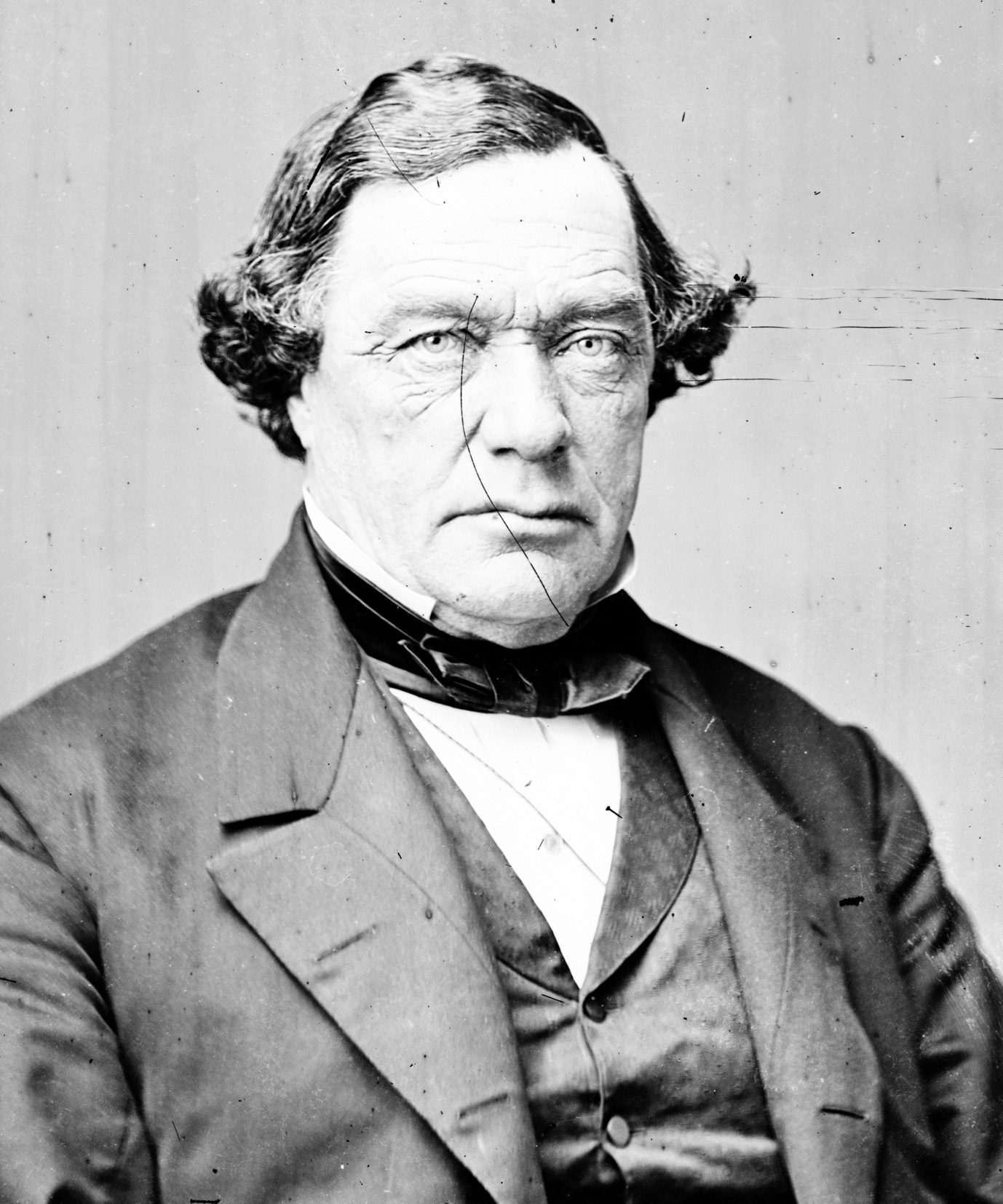
Nominee	Benjamin F. Prescott	Daniel Marcy
Party	Republican	Democratic
Popular vote	40,757	36,726
Percentage	52.33%	47.16%
- County results Prescott: 50–60% Marcy: 50–60%
Governor before election
Person Colby Cheney
Republican
Elected Governor
Benjamin F. Prescott
Republican

The 1877 New Hampshire gubernatorial election was held on March 13, 1877, in order to elect the Governor of New Hampshire. Republican nominee and former Secretary of State of New Hampshire Benjamin F. Prescott defeated Democratic nominee and former member of the U.S. House of Representatives from New Hampshire's 1st district Daniel Marcy.

== General election ==
The Democratic Party nominated Daniel Marcy for a second time following his election loss during the 1876 New Hampshire gubernatorial election. On election day, March 13, 1877, Republican nominee Benjamin F. Prescott won the election by a margin of 4,031 votes against his foremost opponent Democratic nominee Daniel Marcy, thereby retaining Republican control over the office of Governor. Prescott was sworn in as the 36th Governor of New Hampshire on June 6, 1877.

=== Results ===
New Hampshire gubernatorial election, 1877
Party	Candidate	Votes	%
Republican	Benjamin F. Prescott	40,757	52.33
Democratic	Daniel Marcy	36,726	47.16
Temperance	Asa S. Kendall	338	0.43
Others		59	0.08
Total votes		77,880	100.00
Republican hold			
