= 1849 New Hampshire gubernatorial election =

- March 13, 1849
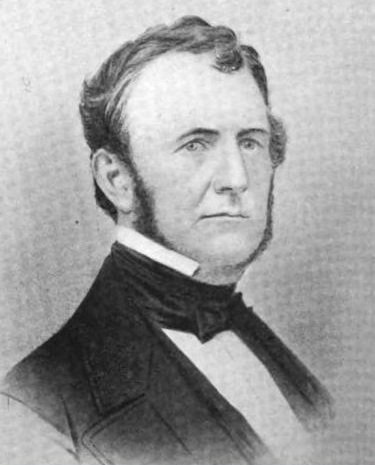

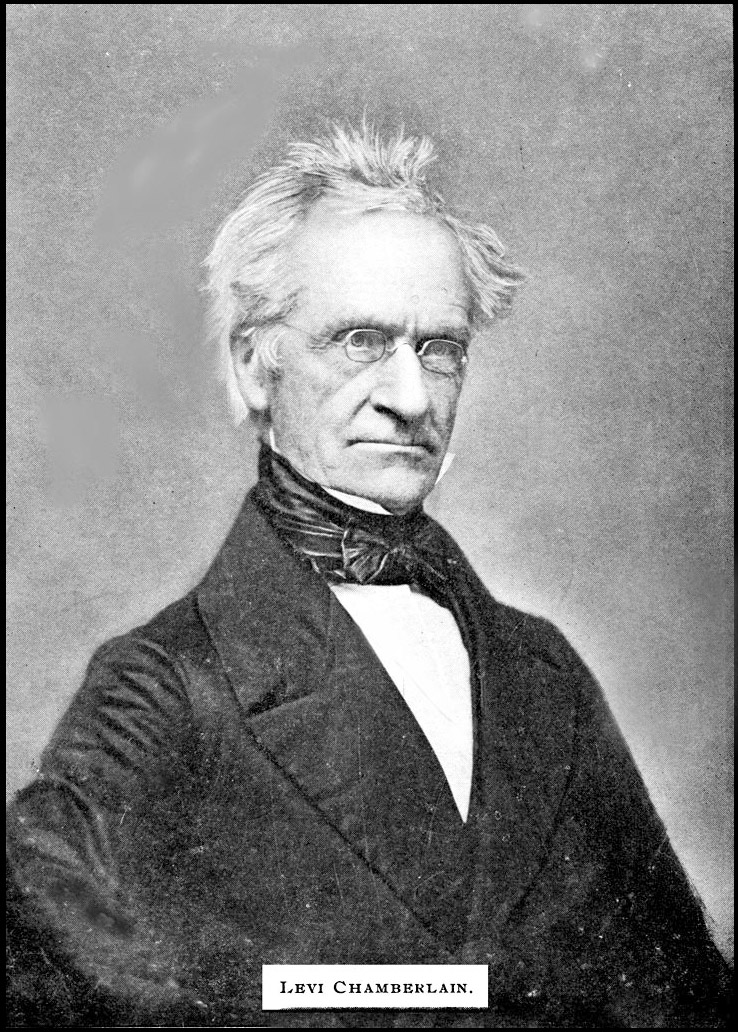

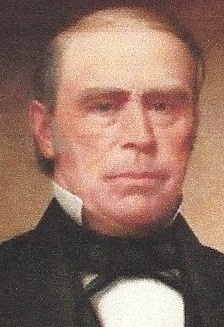
Nominee	Samuel Dinsmoor Jr.	Levi Chamberlain	Nathaniel S. Berry
Party	Democratic	Whig	Free Soil
Popular vote	30,107	18,764	7,045
Percentage	53.73%	33.49%	12.57%
- County results Dinsmoor: 40–50% 50–60% 60–70% 70–80% Chamberlain: 40–50%
Governor before election
Jared W. Williams
Democratic
Elected Governor
Samuel Dinsmoor Jr.
Democratic

The 1849 New Hampshire gubernatorial election was held on March 13, 1849.

Incumbent Democratic Governor Jared W. Williams did not stand for re-election.

Democratic nominee Samuel Dinsmoor Jr. defeated Whig nominee Levi Chamberlain and Free Soil nominee Nathaniel S. Berry with 53.73% of the vote.

== General election ==
=== Candidates ===
- Nathaniel S. Berry, Free Soil, judge of the Grafton County Court of Common Pleas, Free Soil nominee for Governor in 1846, 1847 and 1848
- Levi Chamberlain, Whig, lawyer, former State Senator
- Samuel Dinsmoor Jr., Democratic, former clerk of the New Hampshire Senate, president of the Ashuelot Bank

=== Results ===
1849 New Hampshire gubernatorial election (Note: Some sources give Berry's total as 7,162. The result given is taken from the New Hampshire Senate Journal.)
Party	Candidate	Votes	%	±%
Democratic	Samuel Dinsmoor Jr.	30,107	53.73%	
Whig	Levi Chamberlain	18,764	33.49%	
Free Soil	Nathaniel S. Berry	7,045	12.57%	
Scattering		117	0.21%	
Majority		11,343	20.24%	
Turnout		56,033		
Democratic hold		Swing		
