= 1786 New Hampshire gubernatorial election =

- March 14, 1786
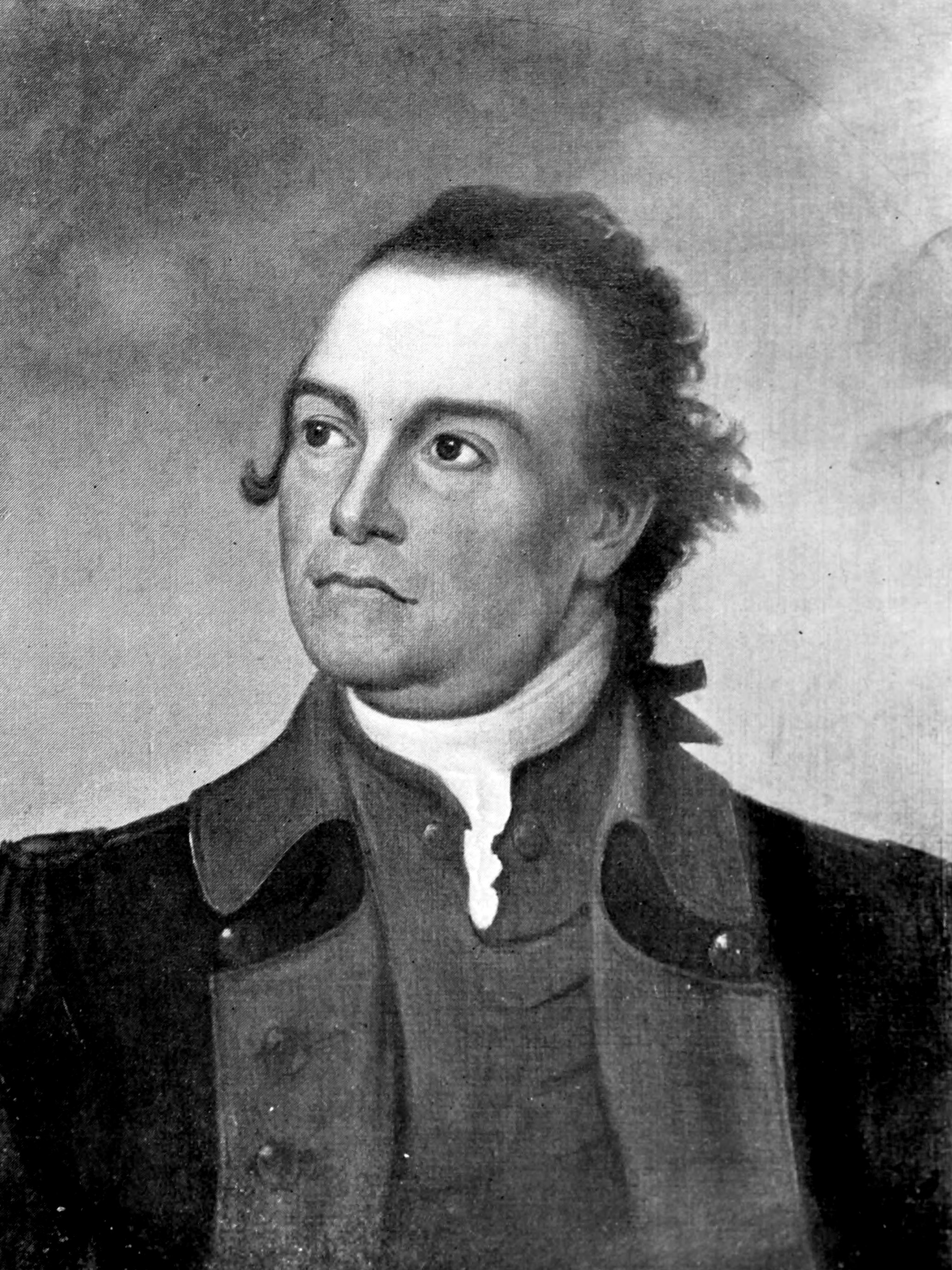

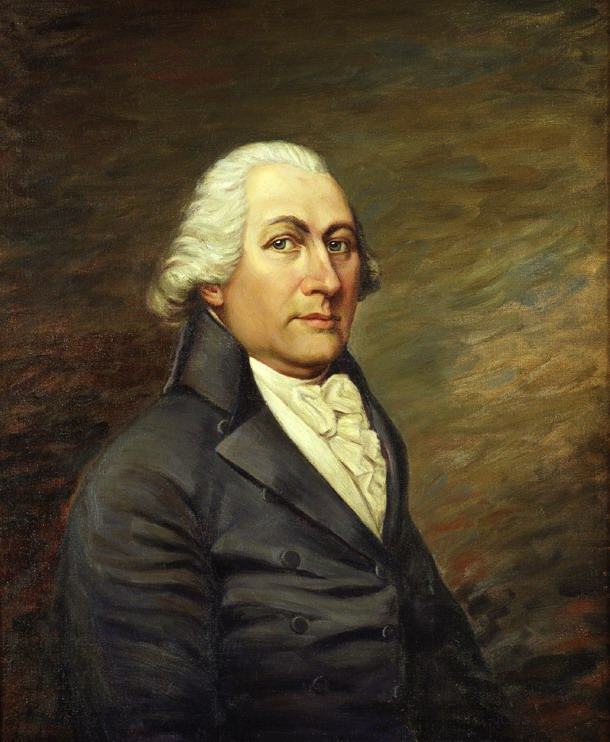
Nominee	John Sullivan	John Langdon
Party	Federalist	Anti-Federalist
Popular vote	4,309	3,600
Percentage	50.30%	42.02%
President before election
John Langdon
Anti-Federalist
Elected President
John Sullivan
Federalist

The 1786 New Hampshire gubernatorial election was held on March 14, 1786, in order to elect the President of New Hampshire. (The office would be renamed to Governor in 1792.) Incumbent Anti-Federalist President John Langdon was defeated in his re-election bid by Federalist candidate John Sullivan, who had initially finished third during the previous President election.

== General election ==
On election day, March 14, 1786, Federalist candidate John Sullivan won the election by a margin of 709 votes against incumbent Anti-Federalist President John Langdon, thereby gaining Federalist control over the office of President. Sullivan was sworn in as the 3rd President of New Hampshire on June 6, 1786.

=== Results ===
New Hampshire gubernatorial election, 1786
Party	Candidate	Votes	%
Federalist	John Sullivan	4,309	50.30
Anti-Federalist	John Langdon (incumbent)	3,600	42.02
	Scattering	658	7.68
Total votes		7,079	100.00
Federalist gain from Anti-Federalist			
