= 1868 New Hampshire gubernatorial election =

- March 10, 1868
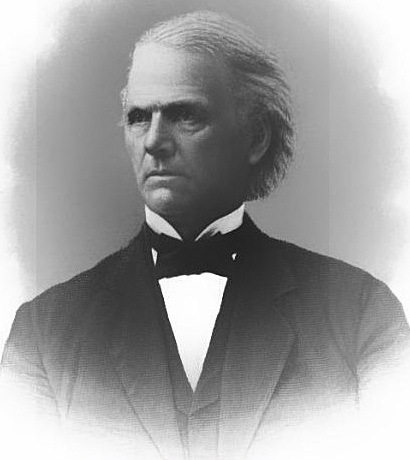

Nominee	Walter Harriman	John G. Sinclair
Party	Republican	Democratic
Popular vote	39,785	37,262
Percentage	51.62%	48.34%
- County results Harriman: 50–60% Sinclair: 50–60%
Governor before election
Walter Harriman
Republican
Elected Governor
Walter Harriman
Republican

The 1868 New Hampshire gubernatorial election was held on March 10, 1868, in order to elect the governor of New Hampshire. Incumbent Republican governor Walter Harriman won re-election against Democratic nominee John G. Sinclair in a rematch of the previous election.

== General election ==
On election day, March 10, 1868, incumbent Republican governor Walter Harriman won re-election by a margin of 2,523 votes against his opponent Democratic nominee John G. Sinclair, thereby retaining Republican control over the office of governor. Harriman was sworn in for his second term on June 2, 1868.

=== Results ===
New Hampshire gubernatorial election, 1868
Party	Candidate	Votes	%
Republican	Walter Harriman (incumbent)	39,785	51.62
Democratic	John G. Sinclair	37,262	48.34
	Scattering	30	0.04
Total votes		77,077	100.00
Republican hold			
