= 1850 New Hampshire gubernatorial election =

- March 12, 1850
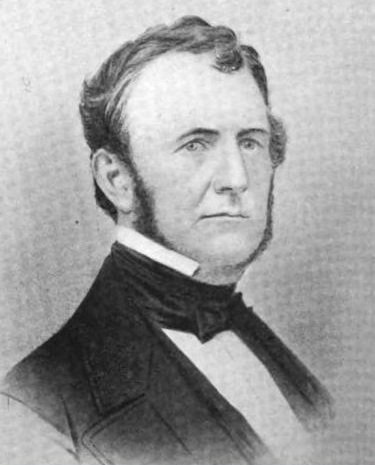

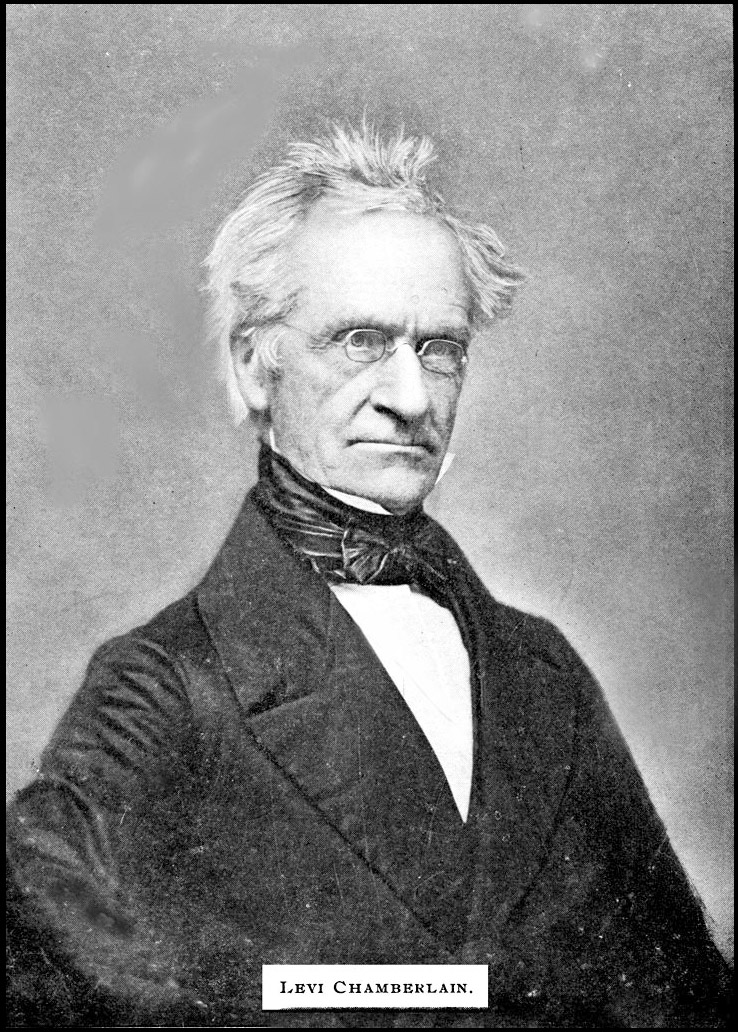

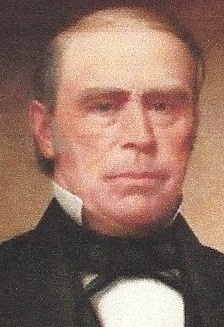
Nominee	Samuel Dinsmoor Jr.	Levi Chamberlain	Nathaniel S. Berry
Party	Democratic	Whig	Free Soil
Popular vote	30,751	18,512	6,472
Percentage	55.12%	33.18%	11.60%
- County results Dinsmoor: 40–50% 50–60% 60–70% 70–80%
Governor before election
Samuel Dinsmoor Jr.
Democratic
Elected Governor
Samuel Dinsmoor Jr.
Democratic

The 1850 New Hampshire gubernatorial election was held on March 12, 1850, in order to elect the governor of New Hampshire. Incumbent Democratic governor Samuel Dinsmoor Jr. won re-election against Whig nominee Levi Chamberlain and Free Soil Party nominee and former member of the New Hampshire Senate Nathaniel S. Berry in a rematch of the previous election.

== General election ==
On election day, March 12, 1850, incumbent Democratic governor Samuel Dinsmoor Jr. won re-election by a margin of 12,239 votes against his foremost opponent Whig nominee Levi Chamberlain, thereby retaining Democratic control over the office of governor. Dinsmoor was sworn in for his second term on June 3, 1850.

=== Results ===
New Hampshire gubernatorial election, 1850
Party	Candidate	Votes	%
Democratic	Samuel Dinsmoor Jr. (incumbent)	30,751	55.12
Whig	Levi Chamberlain	18,512	33.18
Free Soil	Nathaniel S. Berry	6,472	11.60
	Scattering	54	0.10
Total votes		55,789	100.00
Democratic hold			
