= 1875 New Hampshire gubernatorial election =

- March 9, 1875
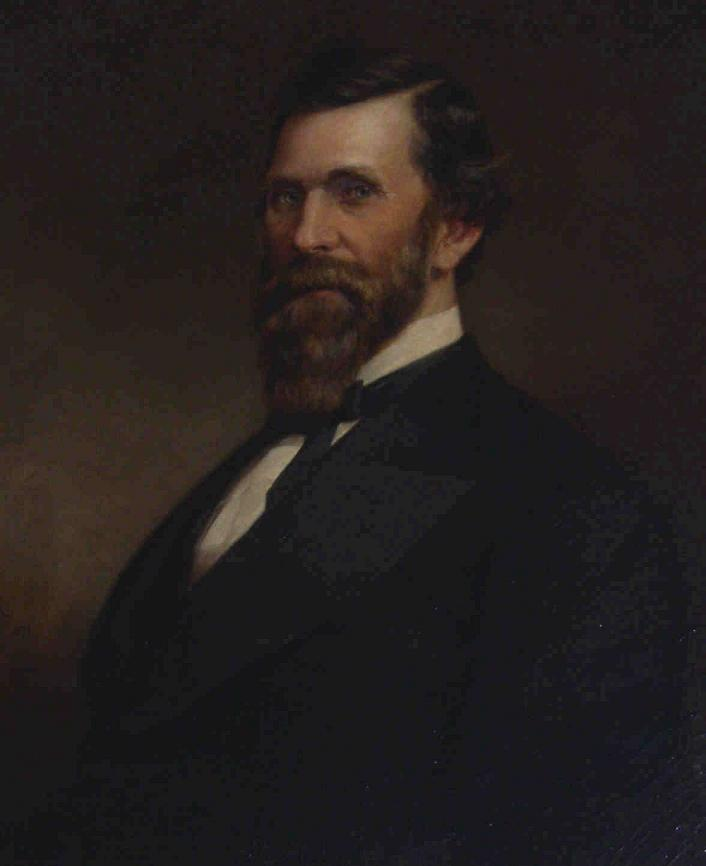

Nominee	Person Colby Cheney	Hiram R. Roberts
Party	Republican	Democratic
Popular vote	39,293	39,121
Percentage	49.61%	49.39%
- County results Cheney: 50–60% Roberts: 50–60%
Governor before election
James A. Weston
Democratic
Elected Governor
Person Colby Cheney
Republican

The 1875 New Hampshire gubernatorial election was held on March 9, 1875, in order to elect the Governor of New Hampshire. Republican nominee and former Mayor of Manchester Person Colby Cheney defeated Democratic nominee Hiram R. Roberts and Temperance nominee Nathaniel White.

== General election ==
On election day, March 9, 1875, Republican nominee Person Colby Cheney won the election by a margin of 172 votes against his foremost opponent Democratic nominee Hiram R. Roberts, thereby gaining Republican control over the office of Governor. Cheney was sworn in as the 35th Governor of New Hampshire on June 2, 1875.

=== Results ===
New Hampshire gubernatorial election, 1875
Party	Candidate	Votes	%
Republican	Person Colby Cheney	39,293	49.61
Democratic	Hiram R. Roberts	39,121	49.39
Prohibition	Nathaniel White	773	0.98
	Scattering	19	0.02
Total votes		79,206	100.00
Republican gain from Democratic			
