= 1847 New Hampshire gubernatorial election =

- March 9, 1847
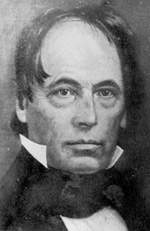

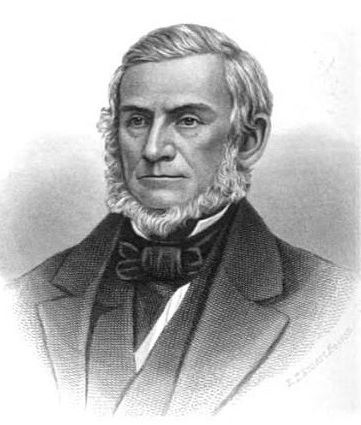

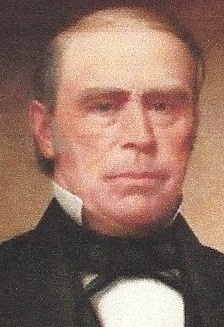
Nominee	Jared W. Williams	Anthony Colby	Nathaniel S. Berry
Party	Democratic	Whig	Liberty
Popular vote	30,806	21,109	8,531
Percentage	50.92%	34.89%	14.10%
- County results Williams: 40–50% 50–60% 70–80% Colby: 40–50%
Governor before election
Anthony Colby
Whig
Elected Governor
Jared W. Williams
Democratic

The 1847 New Hampshire gubernatorial election was held on March 9, 1847, in order to elect the governor of New Hampshire. Democratic nominee and former member of the U.S. House of Representatives from New Hampshire's At-large district (Seat 3) Jared W. Williams defeated incumbent Whig governor Anthony Colby and Liberty Party nominee and former member of the New Hampshire Senate Nathaniel S. Berry in a rematch of the previous election.

== General election ==
On election day, March 9, 1847, Democratic nominee Jared W. Williams won the election by a margin of 9,697 votes against his foremost opponent incumbent Whig governor Anthony Colby, thereby gaining Democratic control over the office of governor. Williams was sworn in as the 21st governor of New Hampshire on June 3, 1847.

=== Results ===
New Hampshire gubernatorial election, 1847
Party	Candidate	Votes	%
Democratic	Jared W. Williams	30,806	50.92
Whig	Anthony Colby (incumbent)	21,109	34.89
Liberty	Nathaniel S. Berry	8,531	14.10
	Scattering	54	0.09
Total votes		60,500	100.00
Democratic gain from Whig			
