= 1792 New Hampshire gubernatorial election =

- March 13, 1792
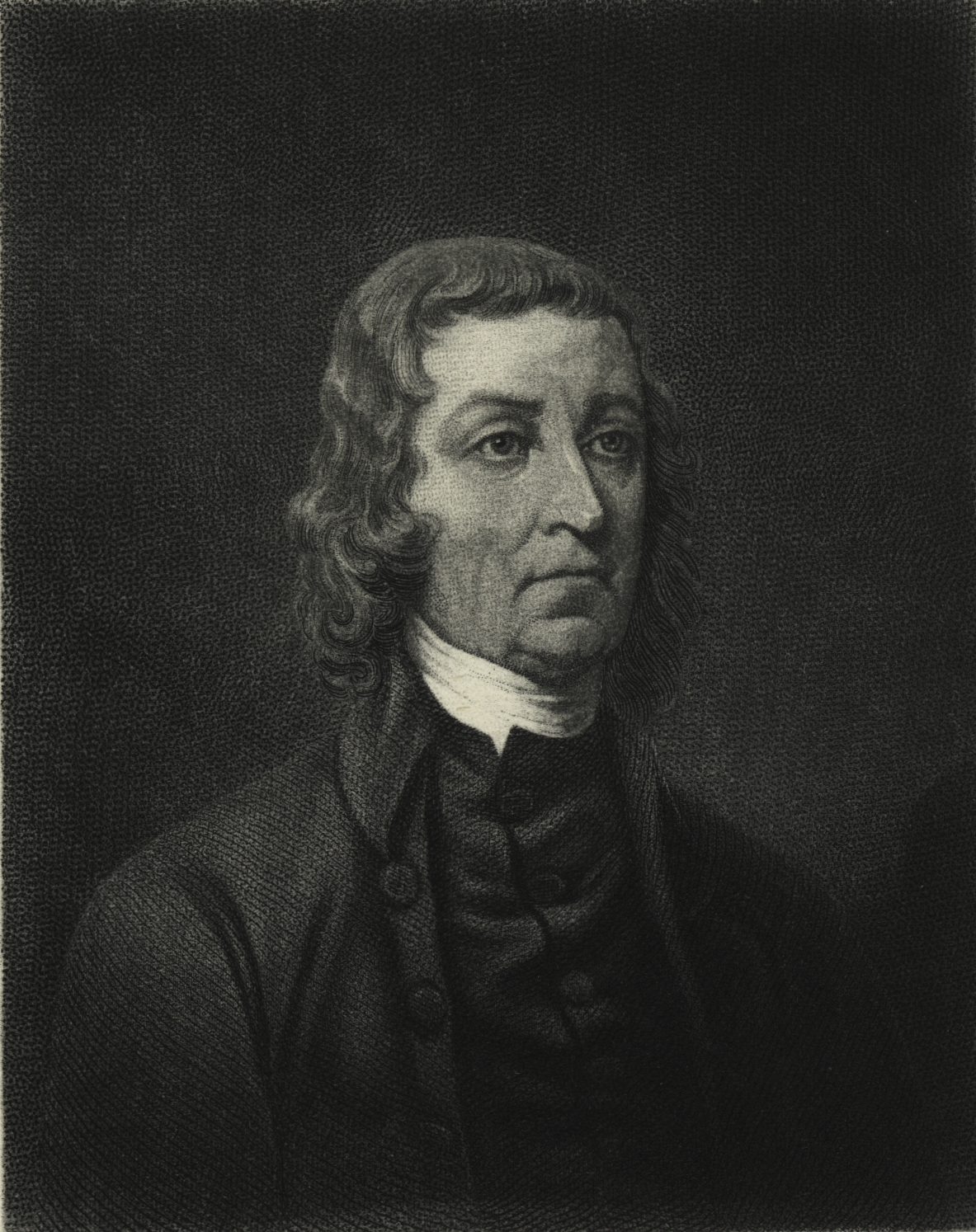
Nominee	Josiah Bartlett
Party	Anti-Federalist
Popular vote	8,092
Percentage	96.46%
Governor before election
Josiah Bartlett
Anti-Federalist
Elected Governor
Josiah Bartlett
Anti-Federalist

The 1792 New Hampshire gubernatorial election was held on March 13, 1792, in order to elect the Governor of New Hampshire. (The office was renamed to Governor this year after previously having been known as the office of President.) Incumbent Anti-Federalist President/Governor Josiah Bartlett was re-elected unopposed.

== General election ==
On election day, March 13, 1792, incumbent Anti-Federalist President/Governor Josiah Bartlett was re-elected unopposed, thereby retaining Anti-Federalist control over the new office of Governor. Bartlett was sworn in for his third term, yet his first as Governor instead of President on June 5, 1792.

=== Results ===
New Hampshire gubernatorial election, 1792
Party	Candidate	Votes	%
Anti-Federalist	Josiah Bartlett (incumbent)	8,092	96.46
	Scattering	297	3.54
Total votes		8,389	100.00
Anti-Federalist hold			
