= 1874 New Hampshire gubernatorial election =

- March 10, 1874
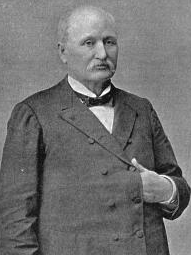

Nominee	James A. Weston	Luther McCutchins
Party	Democratic	Republican
Popular vote	35,608	34,143
Percentage	49.53%	47.49%
- County results Weston: 40–50% 50–60% McCutchins: 40–50% 50–60%
Governor before election
Ezekiel A. Straw
Republican
Elected Governor
James A. Weston
Democratic

The 1874 New Hampshire gubernatorial election was held on March 10, 1874, in order to elect the governor of New Hampshire. Former Democratic governor James A. Weston defeated Republican nominee Luther McCutchins and Temperance nominee John Blackmer.

== General election ==
On election day, March 10, 1874, former Democratic governor James A. Weston won the election by a margin of 1,465 votes against his foremost opponent Republican nominee Luther McCutchins, thereby gaining Democratic control over the office of governor. Weston was sworn in for his second non-consecutive term on June 3, 1874.

=== Results ===
New Hampshire gubernatorial election, 1874
Party	Candidate	Votes	%
Democratic	James A. Weston	35,608	49.53
Republican	Luther McCutchins	34,143	47.49
Prohibition	John Blackmer	2,100	2.92
	Scattering	40	0.06
Total votes		71,891	100.00
Democratic gain from Republican			
