= 1826 New Hampshire gubernatorial election =

- March 14, 1826
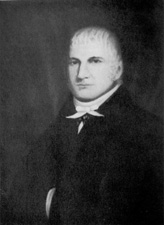

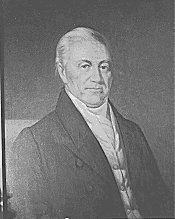
Nominee	David L. Morril	Benjamin Pierce
Party	Democratic-Republican	Democratic-Republican
Popular vote	17,578	12,287
Percentage	58.08%	40.59%
- County results Morril: 50–60% 60–70% 70–80% Pierce: 50–60% 60–70%
Governor before election
David L. Morril
Democratic-Republican
Elected Governor
David L. Morril
Democratic-Republican

The 1826 New Hampshire gubernatorial election was held on March 14, 1826, in order to elect the governor of New Hampshire. Incumbent Democratic-Republican governor David L. Morril defeated former Democratic-Republican member of the New Hampshire House of Representatives Benjamin Pierce.

== General election ==
On election day, March 14, 1826, incumbent Democratic-Republican governor David L. Morril won re-election by a margin of 5,291 votes against his opponent Democratic-Republican candidate Benjamin Pierce, thereby retaining Democratic-Republican control over the office of governor. Morril was sworn in for his third term on June 7, 1826.

=== Results ===
New Hampshire gubernatorial election, 1826
Party	Candidate	Votes	%
Democratic-Republican	David L. Morril (incumbent)	17,578	58.08
Democratic-Republican	Benjamin Pierce	12,287	40.59
	Scattering	403	1.33
Total votes		30,268	100.00
Democratic-Republican hold			
