= 1853 New Hampshire gubernatorial election =

- March 8, 1853
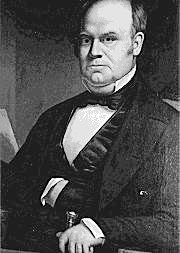

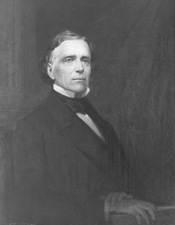

Nominee	Noah Martin	James Bell	John H. White
Party	Democratic	Whig	Free Soil
Popular vote	30,934	17,580	7,997
Percentage	54.69%	31.08%	14.14%
- County results Martin: 40–50% 50–60% 60–70% 70–80%
Governor before election
Noah Martin
Democratic
Elected Governor
Noah Martin
Democratic

The 1853 New Hampshire gubernatorial election was held on March 8, 1853, in order to elect the governor of New Hampshire. Incumbent Democratic governor Noah Martin won re-election against Whig nominee and former member of the New Hampshire House of Representatives James Bell and Free Soil Party nominee John H. White.

== General election ==
On election day, March 8, 1853, incumbent Democratic governor Noah Martin won re-election by a margin of 13,354 votes against his foremost opponent Whig nominee James Bell, thereby retaining Democratic control over the office of governor. Martin was sworn in for his second term on June 8, 1853.

=== Results ===
New Hampshire gubernatorial election, 1853
Party	Candidate	Votes	%
Democratic	Noah Martin (incumbent)	30,934	54.69
Whig	James Bell	17,580	31.08
Free Soil	John H. White	7,997	14.14
	Scattering	47	0.09
Total votes		56,558	100.00
Democratic hold			
