= 1851 New Hampshire gubernatorial election =

- March 11, 1851
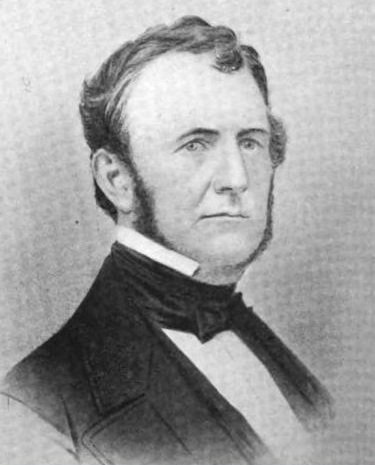

| Nominee | Samuel Dinsmoor Jr. | Thomas E. Sawyer | John Atwood |
| Party | Democratic | Whig | Free Soil |
| Popular vote | 27,425 | 18,458 | 12,049 |
| Percentage | 47.19% | 31.76% | 20.73% |
- County results Dinsmoor: 30–40% 40–50% 50–60% Sawyer: 40–50%
Governor before election
Samuel Dinsmoor Jr.
Democratic
Elected Governor
Samuel Dinsmoor Jr.
Democratic

The 1851 New Hampshire gubernatorial election was held on March 11, 1851, in order to elect the governor of New Hampshire. Incumbent Democratic governor Samuel Dinsmoor Jr. won re-election against Whig nominee Thomas E. Sawyer and Free Soil Party nominee John Atwood. Since no candidate received a majority in the popular vote, Dinsmoor was elected by the New Hampshire General Court per the state constitution.

== General election ==
On election day, March 11, 1851, incumbent Democratic governor Samuel Dinsmoor Jr. won re-election by a margin of 8,967 votes against his foremost opponent Whig nominee Thomas E. Sawyer, but because no candidate received a majority of the popular vote, a separate election was held by the New Hampshire General Court, which chose Governor Dinsmoor as the winner. He thereby retained Democratic control over the office of governor. Dinsmoor was sworn in for his third term on June 3, 1851.

=== Results ===
New Hampshire gubernatorial election, 1851
| Party | Candidate | Votes | % |
|---|---|---|---|
| Democratic | Samuel Dinsmoor Jr. (incumbent) | 27,425 | 47.19 |
| Whig | Thomas E. Sawyer | 18,458 | 31.76 |
| Free Soil | John Atwood | 12,049 | 20.73 |
| | Scattering | 179 | 0.32 |
| Total votes | | 58,111 | 100.00 |
| Democratic hold | | | |
