= 1795 New Hampshire gubernatorial election =

- March 10, 1795
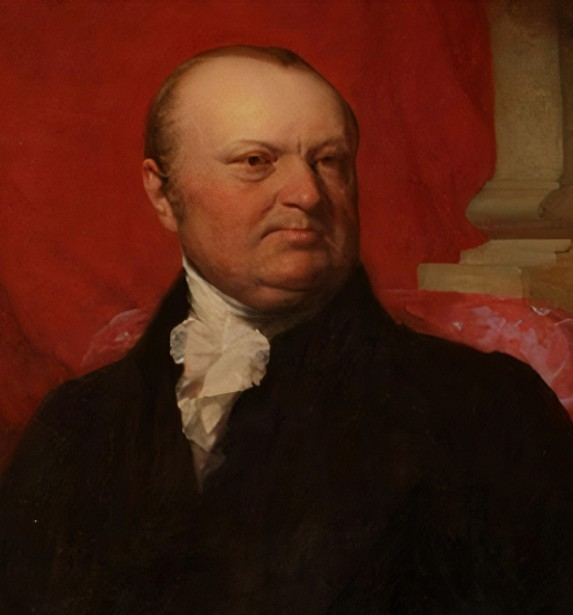
Nominee	John Taylor Gilman
Party	Federalist
Popular vote	9,340
Percentage	98.94%
Governor before election
John Taylor Gilman
Federalist
Elected Governor
John Taylor Gilman
Federalist

The 1795 New Hampshire gubernatorial election was held on March 10, 1795, in order to elect the Governor of New Hampshire. Incumbent Federalist Governor John Taylor Gilman was re-elected unopposed.

== General election ==
On election day, March 10, 1795, incumbent Federalist Governor John Taylor Gilman won re-election as he ran unopposed, thereby retaining Federalist control over the office of Governor. Gilman was sworn in for his second term on June 6, 1795.

=== Results ===
New Hampshire gubernatorial election, 1795
Party	Candidate	Votes	%
Federalist	John Taylor Gilman (incumbent)	9,340	98.94
	Scattering	100	1.06
Total votes		9,440	100.00
Federalist hold			
