= 1824 New Hampshire gubernatorial election =

- March 9, 1824
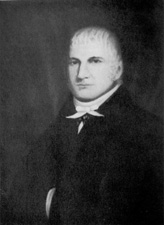

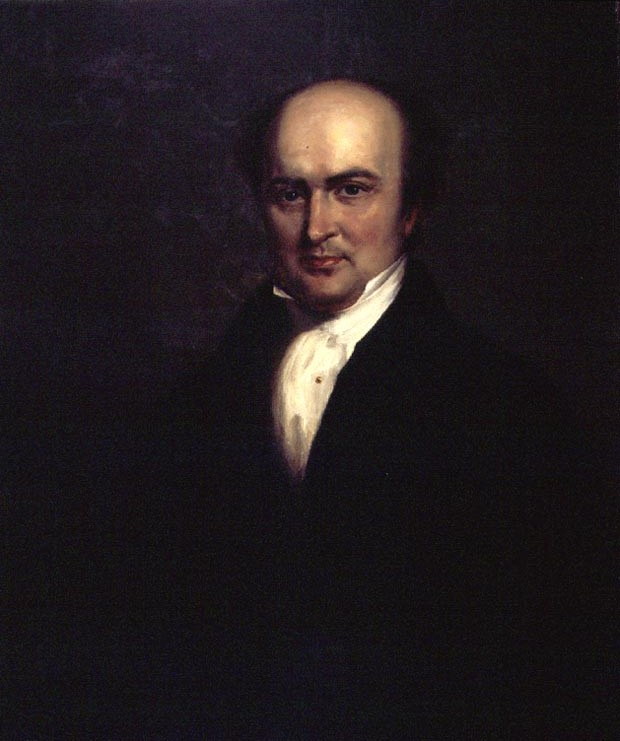

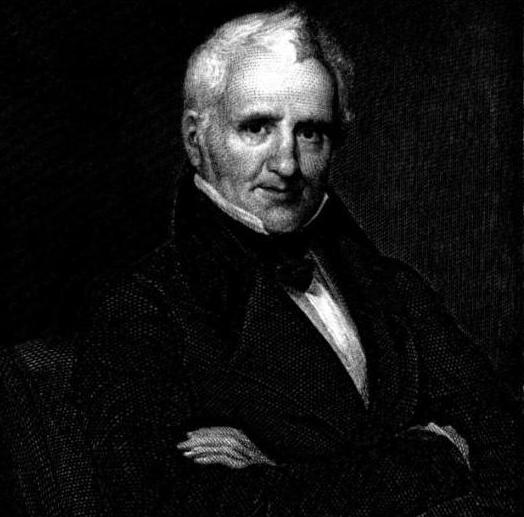
| Nominee | David L. Morril | Levi Woodbury | Jeremiah Smith |
| Party | Democratic-Republican | Democratic-Republican | Federalist |
| Popular vote | 14,985 | 11,741 | 3,300 |
| Percentage | 49.19% | 38.54% | 10.83% |
- County results Morril: 40–50% 50–60% 60–70% Woodbury: 50–60% 60–70%
Governor before election
Levi Woodbury
Democratic-Republican
Elected Governor
David L. Morril
Democratic-Republican

The 1824 New Hampshire gubernatorial election was held on March 9, 1824, in order to elect the governor of New Hampshire. Former Democratic-Republican United States senator from New Hampshire David L. Morril defeated incumbent Democratic-Republican governor Levi Woodbury and former Federalist governor Jeremiah Smith. Since no candidate received a majority in the popular vote, Morril was elected by the New Hampshire General Court per the state constitution.

== General election ==
On election day, March 9, 1824, Democratic-Republican candidate David L. Morril won the popular vote by a margin of 3,244 votes against his foremost opponent and incumbent Democratic-Republican governor Levi Woodbury. But since no candidate received a majority of the popular vote, a separate election was held by the New Hampshire General Court, which chose Morril as the winner, thereby retaining Democratic-Republican control over the office of governor. Morril was sworn in as the 10th governor of New Hampshire on June 2, 1824.

=== Results ===
New Hampshire gubernatorial election, 1824
| Party | Candidate | Votes | % |
|---|---|---|---|
| Democratic-Republican | David L. Morril | 14,985 | 49.19 |
| Democratic-Republican | Levi Woodbury (incumbent) | 11,741 | 38.54 |
| Federalist | Jeremiah Smith | 3,300 | 10.83 |
| | Scattering | 438 | 1.44 |
| Total votes | | 30,464 | 100.00 |
| Democratic-Republican hold | | | |
