= 1870 New Hampshire gubernatorial election =

- March 8, 1870
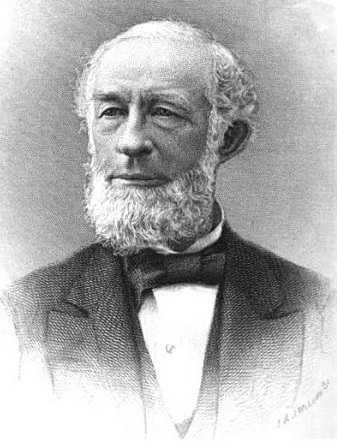

Nominee	Onslow Stearns	John Bedell	Samuel Flint
Party	Republican	Democratic	Labor Reform Party
Popular vote	34,912	25,023	7,369
Percentage	50.99%	36.55%	10.76%
- County results Stearns: 40–50% 50–60% 60–70% Bedell: 40–50% 50–60%
Governor before election
Onslow Stearns
Republican
Elected Governor
Onslow Stearns
Republican

The 1870 New Hampshire gubernatorial election was held on March 8, 1870, in order to elect the governor of New Hampshire. Incumbent Republican governor Onslow Stearns won re-election against Democratic nominee John Bedell, Labor Reform Party nominee Samuel Flint and Temperance nominee Lorenzo D. Barrows.

== General election ==
On election day, March 8, 1870, incumbent Republican governor Onslow Stearns won re-election by a margin of 9,889 votes against his foremost opponent Democratic nominee John Bedell, thereby retaining Republican control over the office of governor. Stearns was sworn in for his second term on June 14, 1870.

=== Results ===
New Hampshire gubernatorial election, 1870
Party	Candidate	Votes	%
Republican	Onslow Stearns (incumbent)	34,912	50.99
Democratic	John Bedell	25,023	36.55
Labor Reform Party	Samuel Flint	7,369	10.76
Prohibition	Lorenzo D. Barrows	1,135	1.66
	Scattering	33	0.04
Total votes		68,472	100.00
Republican hold			
