= 1865 New Hampshire gubernatorial election =

- March 14, 1865
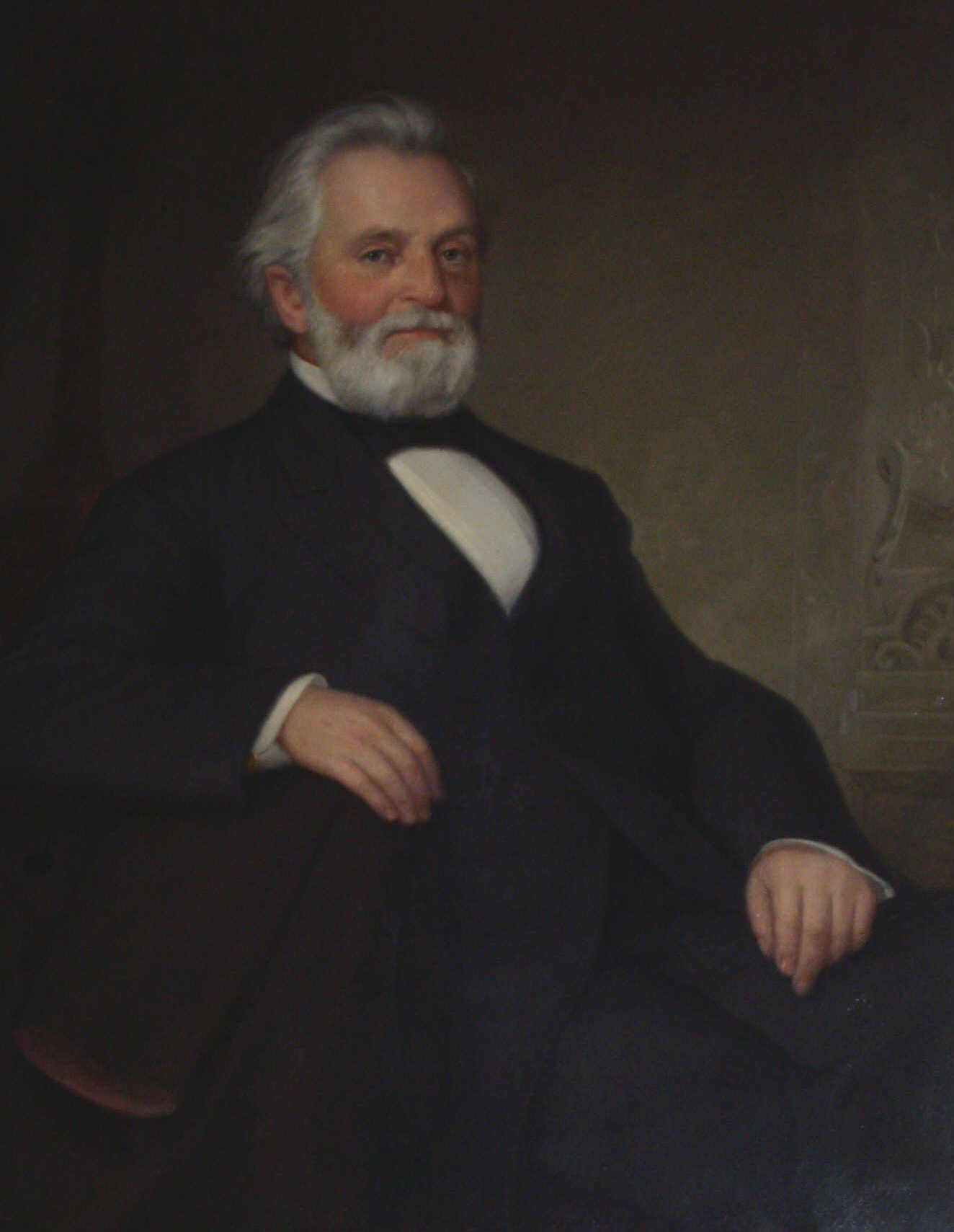

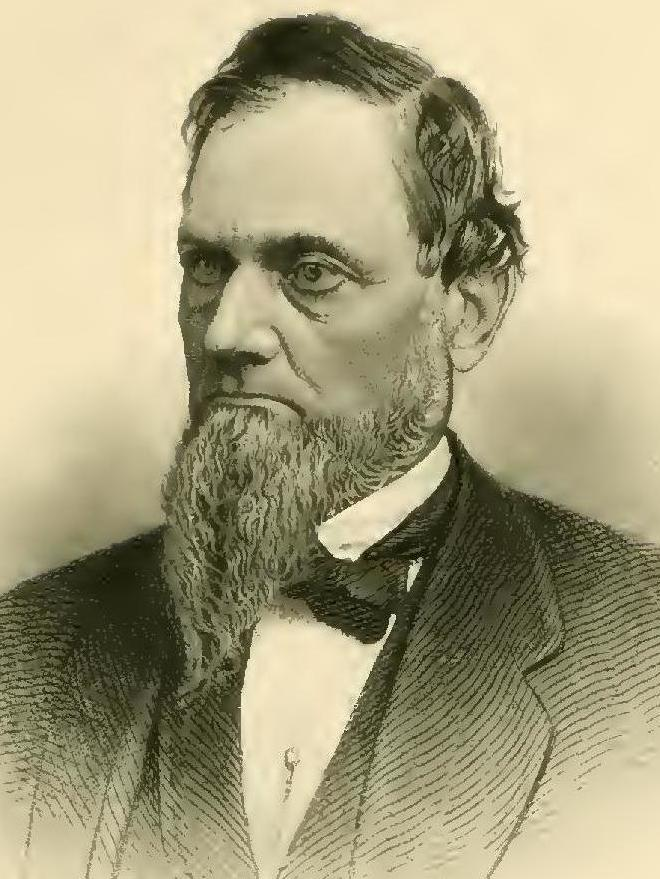
Nominee	Frederick Smyth	Edward W. Harrington
Party	Republican	Democratic
Popular vote	34,145	28,017
Percentage	54.91%	45.06%
- County results Smyth: 50–60% 60–70% Harrington: 50–60%
Governor before election
Joseph A. Gilmore
Republican
Elected Governor
Frederick Smyth
Republican

The 1865 New Hampshire gubernatorial election was held on March 14, 1865, in order to elect the Governor of New Hampshire. Republican nominee and incumbent Mayor of Manchester Frederick Smyth defeated Democratic nominee and former Mayor of Manchester Edward W. Harrington.

== General election ==
On election day, March 14, 1865, Republican nominee Frederick Smyth won the election by a margin of 6,128 votes against his opponent Democratic nominee Edward W. Harrington, thereby retaining Republican control over the office of Governor. Smyth was sworn in as the 30th Governor of New Hampshire on June 7, 1865.

=== Results ===
New Hampshire gubernatorial election, 1865
Party	Candidate	Votes	%
Republican	Frederick Smyth	34,145	54.91
Democratic	Edward W. Harrington	28,017	45.06
	Scattering	18	0.03
Total votes		52,180	100.00
Republican hold			
