= 1791 New Hampshire gubernatorial election =

Election held on March 8, 1791, to elect President of New Hampshire

- March 8, 1791
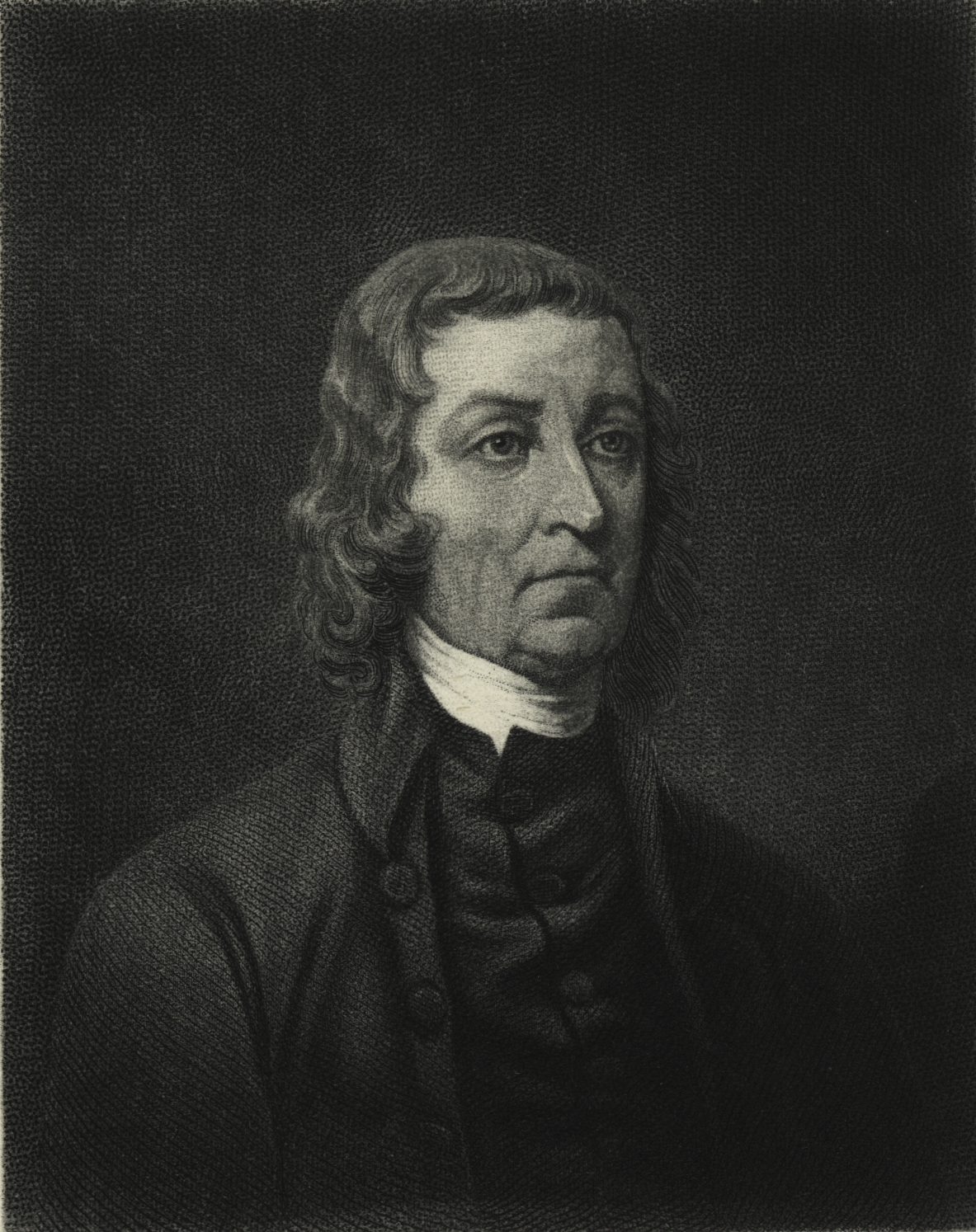
| Nominee | Josiah Bartlett |
| Party | Anti-Federalist |
| Popular vote | 8,679 |
| Percentage | 96.79% |
President before election
Josiah Bartlett
Anti-Federalist
Elected President
Josiah Bartlett
Anti-Federalist

The 1791 New Hampshire gubernatorial election was held on March 8, 1791, in order to elect the President of New Hampshire. (The office would be renamed to Governor in 1792.) Incumbent Anti-Federalist President Josiah Bartlett was re-elected unopposed.

== General election ==
On election day, March 8, 1791, incumbent Anti-Federalist President Josiah Bartlett was re-elected unopposed, thereby retaining Anti-Federalist control over the office of President. Bartlett was sworn in for his second term on June 5, 1791.

=== Results ===
New Hampshire gubernatorial election, 1791
| Party | Candidate | Votes | % |
|---|---|---|---|
| Anti-Federalist | Josiah Bartlett (incumbent) | 8,679 | 96.79 |
| | Scattering | 288 | 3.21 |
| Total votes | | 8,967 | 100.00 |
| Anti-Federalist hold | | | |
