= 1788 New Hampshire gubernatorial election =

- March 11, 1788
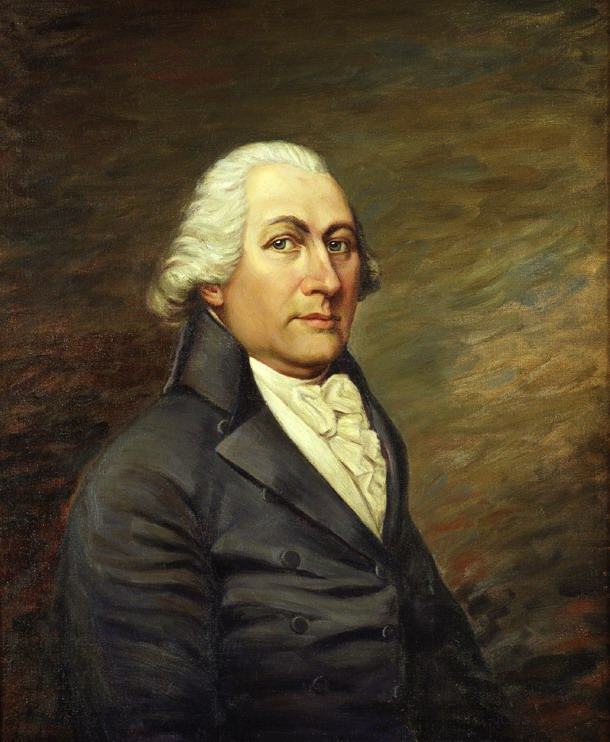

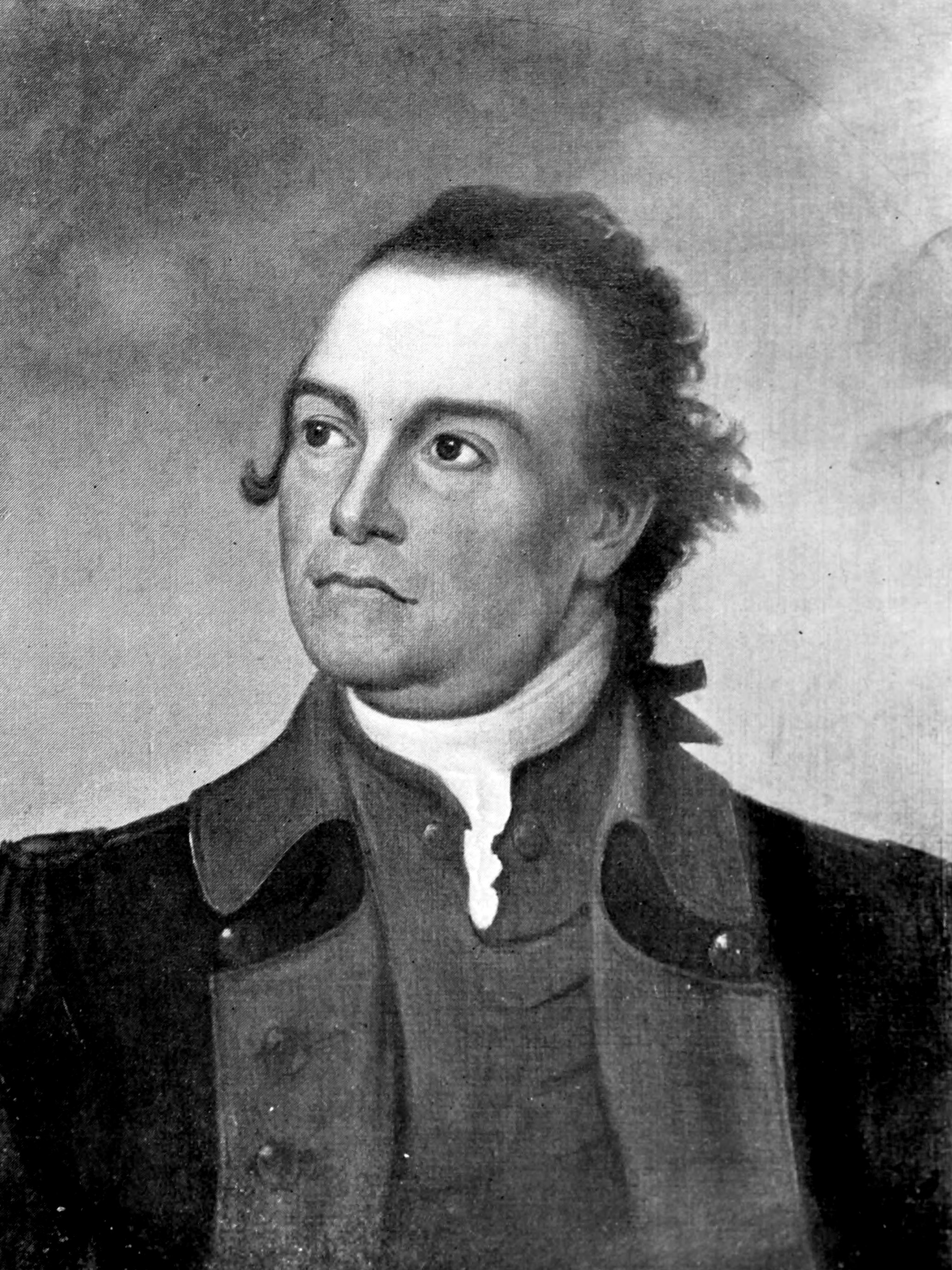
Nominee	John Langdon	John Sullivan
Party	Anti-Federalist	Federalist
Popular vote	4,421	3,664
Percentage	50.02%	41.46%
President before election
John Sullivan
Federalist
Elected President
John Langdon
Anti-Federalist

The 1788 New Hampshire gubernatorial election was held on March 11, 1788, in order to elect the President of New Hampshire. (The office would be renamed to Governor in 1792.) Incumbent Federalist President John Sullivan was defeated in his re-election bid by Anti-Federalist candidate and former President John Langdon, who had initially finished first in the popular vote during the previous President election.

== General election ==
On election day, March 11, 1788, Anti-Federalist candidate and former President John Langdon won the election by a margin of 757 votes against incumbent Federalist President John Sullivan, thereby gaining Anti-Federalist control over the office of President. Langdon was sworn in for his second term on June 6, 1788.

=== Results ===
New Hampshire gubernatorial election, 1788
Party	Candidate	Votes	%
Anti-Federalist	John Langdon	4,421	50.02
Federalist	John Sullivan (incumbent)	3,664	41.46
	Scattering	753	8.52
Total votes		7,079	100.00
Anti-Federalist gain from Federalist			
