= 1793 New Hampshire gubernatorial election =

- March 12, 1793
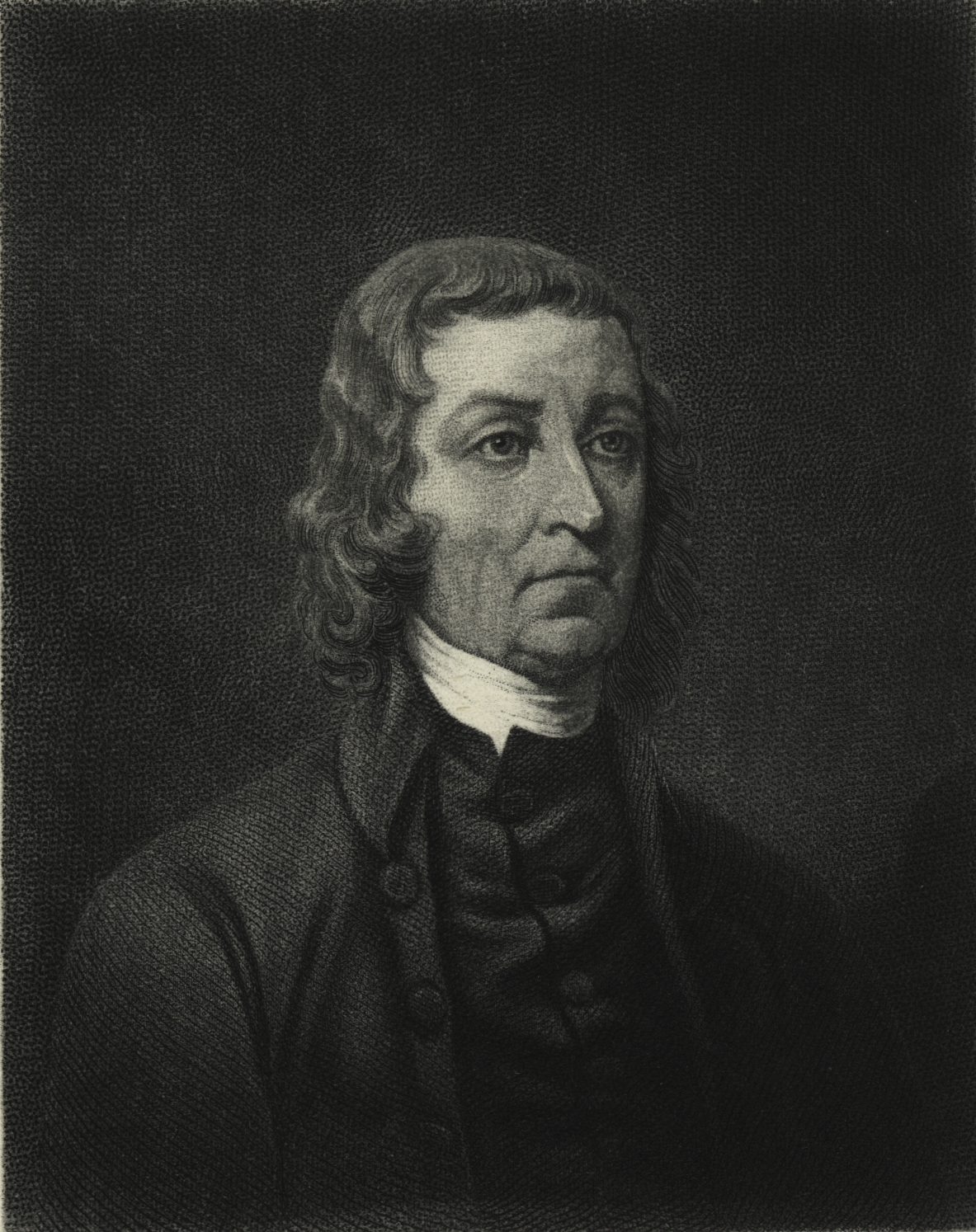

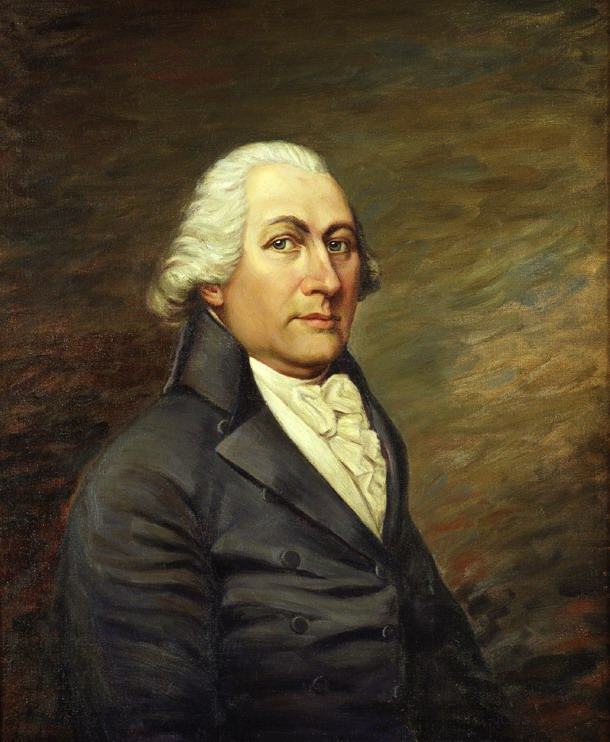

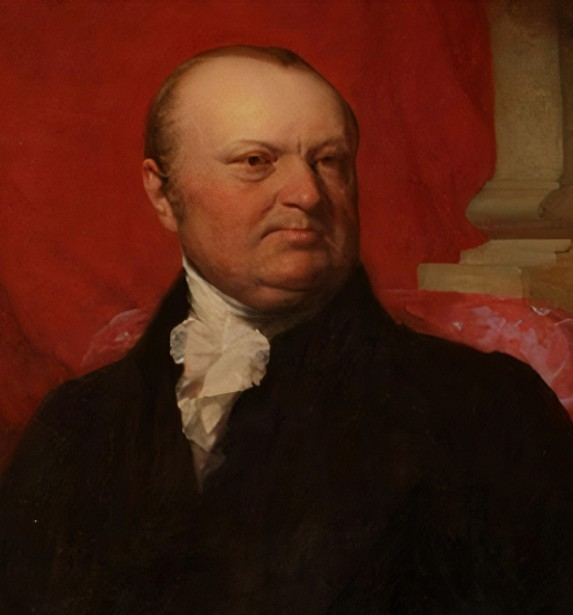
Nominee	Josiah Bartlett	John Langdon	John Taylor Gilman
Party	Anti-Federalist	Anti-Federalist	Federalist
Popular vote	7,388	1,306	708
Percentage	74.98%	13.25%	7.19%
Governor before election
Josiah Bartlett
Anti-Federalist
Elected Governor
Josiah Bartlett
Anti-Federalist

The 1793 New Hampshire gubernatorial election was held on March 12, 1793, in order to elect the Governor of New Hampshire. Incumbent Anti-Federalist Governor Josiah Bartlett defeated former Anti-Federalist Governor John Langdon, Federalist candidate John Taylor Gilman and Anti-Federalist candidate Timothy Walker.

== General election ==
On election day, March 12, 1793, incumbent Anti-Federalist Governor Josiah Bartlett won re-election by a margin of 6,082 votes against his foremost opponent former Anti-Federalist Governor John Langdon, thereby retaining Anti-Federalist control over the office of Governor. Bartlett was sworn in for his fourth term on June 5, 1793.

=== Results ===
New Hampshire gubernatorial election, 1793
Party	Candidate	Votes	%
Anti-Federalist	Josiah Bartlett (incumbent)	7,388	74.98
Anti-Federalist	John Langdon	1,306	13.25
Federalist	John Taylor Gilman	708	7.19
Anti-Federalist	Timothy Walker	382	3.88
	Scattering	70	0.70
Total votes		9,854	100.00
Anti-Federalist hold			
