= 1866 New Hampshire gubernatorial election =

- March 13, 1866
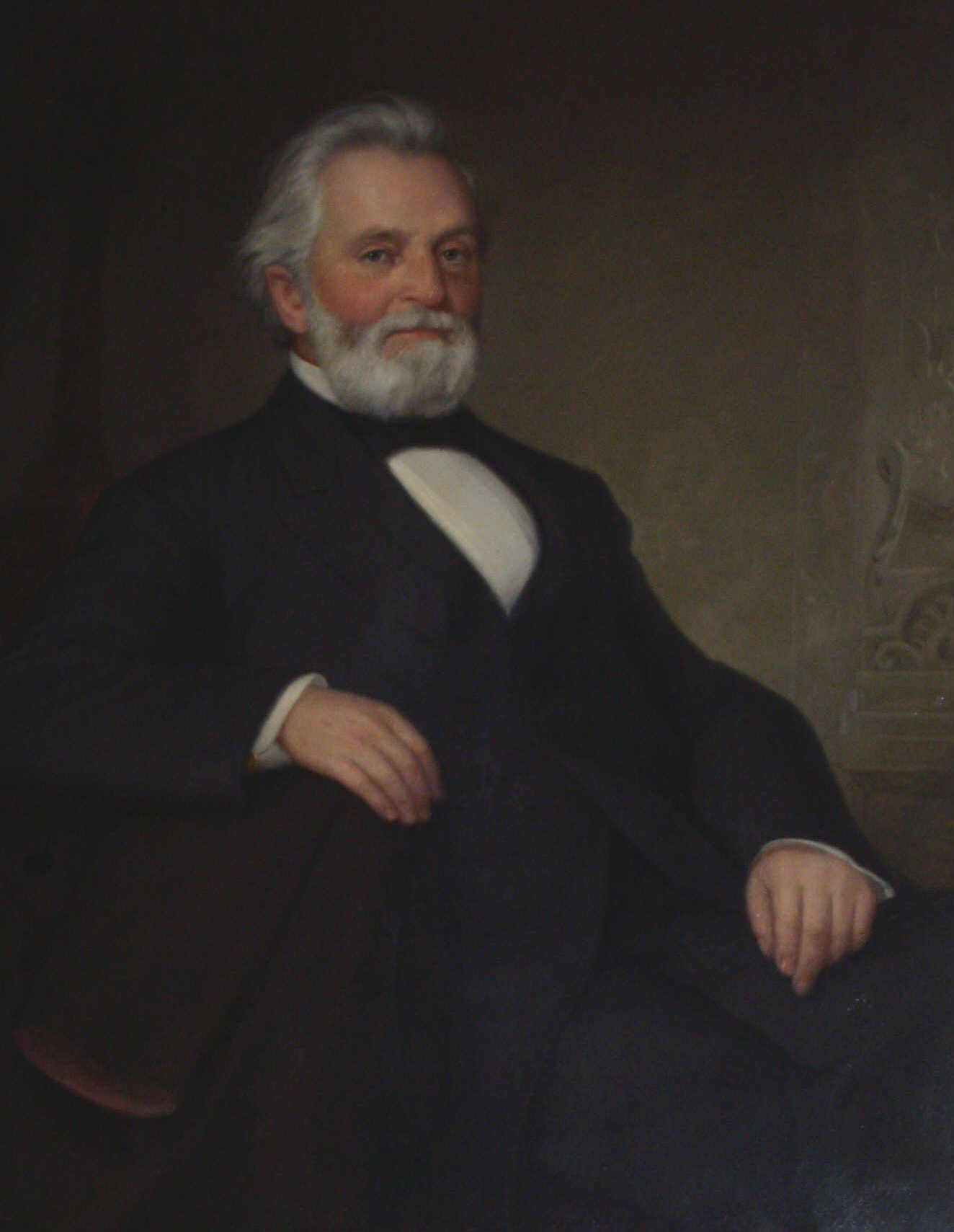

Nominee	Frederick Smyth	John G. Sinclair
Party	Republican	Democratic
Popular vote	35,137	30,481
Percentage	53.53%	46.44%
- County results Smyth: 50–60% 60–70% Sinclair: 50–60%
Governor before election
Frederick Smyth
Republican
Elected Governor
Frederick Smyth
Republican

The 1866 New Hampshire gubernatorial election was held on March 13, 1866, in order to elect the governor of New Hampshire. Incumbent Republican governor Frederick Smyth won re-election against Democratic nominee John G. Sinclair.

== General election ==
On election day, March 13, 1866, incumbent Republican governor Frederick Smyth won re-election by a margin of 4,656 votes against his opponent Democratic nominee John G. Sinclair, thereby retaining Republican control over the office of governor. Smyth was sworn in for his second term on June 5, 1866.

=== Results ===
New Hampshire gubernatorial election, 1866
Party	Candidate	Votes	%
Republican	Frederick Smyth (incumbent)	35,137	53.53
Democratic	John G. Sinclair	30,481	46.44
	Scattering	18	0.03
Total votes		65,636	100.00
Republican hold			
