= 1836 New Hampshire gubernatorial election =

- March 8, 1836
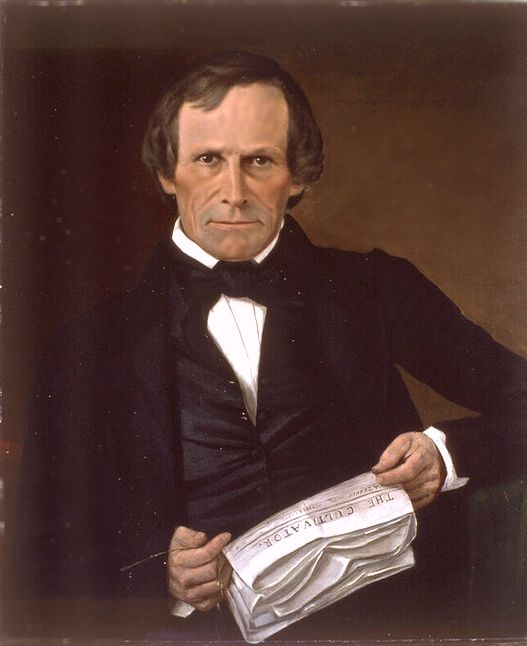

Nominee	Isaac Hill	Joseph Healey	George Sullivan
Party	Democratic	Whig	Federalist
Popular vote	24,904	2,566	2,230
Percentage	81.22%	8.37%	7.27%
- County results Hill: 50–60% 60–70% 80–90% 90–100%
Governor before election
William Badger
Democratic
Elected Governor
Isaac Hill
Democratic

The 1836 New Hampshire gubernatorial election was held on March 8, 1836, to elect the Governor of New Hampshire. The Democratic former U.S. senator from New Hampshire Isaac Hill defeated the Whig candidate Joseph Healey and the Federalist former Attorney General of New Hampshire George Sullivan.

Hill's re-election was considered nearly inevitable, and his opponents struggled to recruit a candidate to contest the election. In March, the Democratic Rhode Island Republican reported that the defunct Federalist Party had nominated Sullivan, but he had declined to run.

== General election ==
=== Results ===
New Hampshire gubernatorial election, 1836
Party	Candidate	Votes	%
Democratic	Isaac Hill	24,904	81.22
Whig	Joseph Healey	2,566	8.37
Federalist	George Sullivan	2,230	7.27
	Scattering	961	3.14
Total votes		30,661	100.00
Democratic hold			
