= 1869 New Hampshire gubernatorial election =

- March 9, 1869
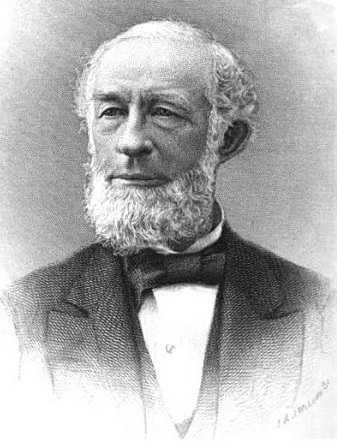

Nominee	Onslow Stearns	John Bedell
Party	Republican	Democratic
Popular vote	35,777	32,004
Percentage	52.75%	47.19%
- County results Stearns: 50–60% Bedell: 50–60%
Governor before election
Walter Harriman
Republican
Elected Governor
Onslow Stearns
Republican

The 1869 New Hampshire gubernatorial election was held on March 9, 1869, in order to elect the Governor of New Hampshire. Republican nominee and former member of the New Hampshire Senate Onslow Stearns defeated Democratic nominee John Bedell.

== General election ==
On election day, March 9, 1869, Republican nominee Onslow Stearns won the election by a margin of 3,773 votes against his opponent Democratic nominee John Bedell, thereby retaining Republican control over the office of Governor. Stearns was sworn in as the 32nd Governor of New Hampshire on June 2, 1869.

=== Results ===
New Hampshire gubernatorial election, 1869
Party	Candidate	Votes	%
Republican	Onslow Stearns	35,777	52.75
Democratic	John Bedell	32,004	47.19
	Scattering	42	0.06
Total votes		67,823	100.00
Republican hold			
