= 1796 New Hampshire gubernatorial election =

- March 8, 1796
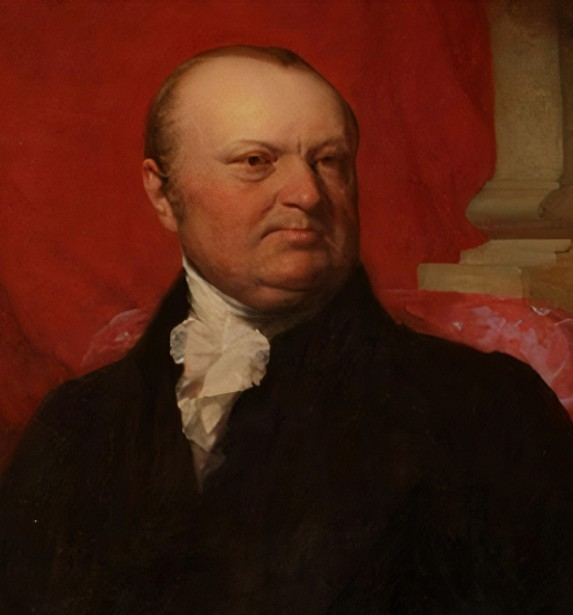
Nominee	John Taylor Gilman
Party	Federalist
Popular vote	7,809
Percentage	72.47%
Governor before election
John Taylor Gilman
Federalist
Elected Governor
John Taylor Gilman
Federalist

The 1796 New Hampshire gubernatorial election was held on March 8, 1796, in order to elect the Governor of New Hampshire. Incumbent Federalist Governor John Taylor Gilman was re-elected unopposed.

== General election ==
On election day, March 8, 1796, incumbent Federalist Governor John Taylor Gilman won re-election as he ran unopposed, thereby retaining Federalist control over the office of Governor. Gilman was sworn in for his third term on June 6, 1796.

=== Results ===
New Hampshire gubernatorial election, 1796
Party	Candidate	Votes	%
Federalist	John Taylor Gilman (incumbent)	7,809	72.47
	Scattering	2,966	27.53
Total votes		10,775	100.00
Federalist hold			
