= 1825 New Hampshire gubernatorial election =

- March 8, 1825
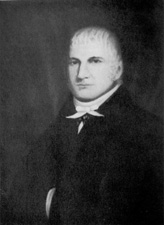
Nominee	David L. Morril
Party	Democratic-Republican
Popular vote	29,770
Percentage	97.60%
- County results Morril: 90–100%
Governor before election
David L. Morril
Democratic-Republican
Elected Governor
David L. Morril
Democratic-Republican

The 1825 New Hampshire gubernatorial election was held on March 8, 1825, in order to elect the governor of New Hampshire. Incumbent Democratic-Republican governor David L. Morril won re-election as he ran unopposed.

== General election ==
On election day, March 8, 1825, incumbent Democratic-Republican governor David L. Morril won re-election as he ran unopposed, thereby retaining Democratic-Republican control over the office of governor. Morril was sworn in for his second term on June 7, 1825.

=== Results ===
New Hampshire gubernatorial election, 1825
Party	Candidate	Votes	%
Democratic-Republican	David L. Morril (incumbent)	29,770	97.60
	Scattering	733	2.40
Total votes		30,503	100.00
Democratic-Republican hold			
