= 1784 New Hampshire gubernatorial election =

- March 9, 1784
Nominee	Meshech Weare
Party	Nonpartisan
Percentage	100.00%
President before election
Office Established
Elected President
Meshech Weare
Nonpartisan

The 1784 New Hampshire gubernatorial election was held on March 9, 1784, in order to elect the First President of New Hampshire. (The office would be renamed to Governor in 1792.) Former Non-Partisan Chief Justice of the New Hampshire Superior Court of Judicature Meshech Weare won the election as he was the only candidate.

== General election ==
On election day, March 9, 1784, Meshech Weare won the election, but its results are unknown. Weare was sworn in as the 1st President of New Hampshire on June 5, 1784.

=== Results ===
New Hampshire gubernatorial election, 1784
Party	Candidate	Votes	%
Nonpartisan	Meshech Weare		100.00
Total votes			100.00
Nonpartisan hold			
