= 1794 New Hampshire gubernatorial election =

- March 11, 1794
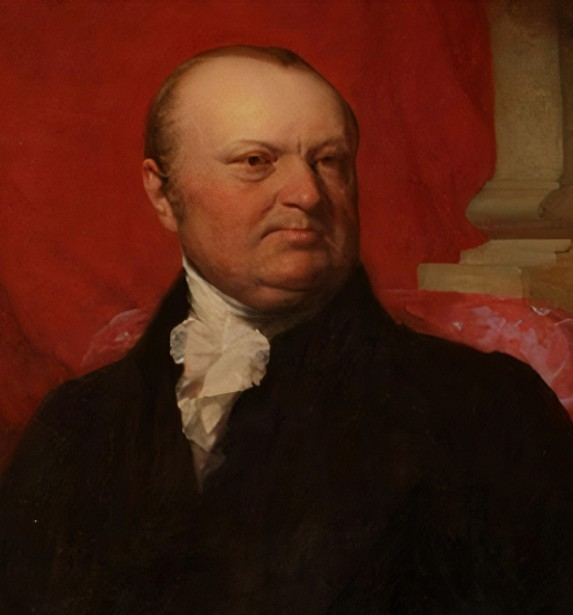
Nominee	John Taylor Gilman
Party	Federalist
Popular vote	7,629
Percentage	72.87%
President before election
Josiah Bartlett
Anti-Federalist
Elected President
John Taylor Gilman
Federalist

The 1794 New Hampshire gubernatorial election was held on March 11, 1794, in order to elect the Governor of New Hampshire. Federalist candidate John Taylor Gilman was elected unopposed.

== General election ==
On election day, March 11, 1794, Federalist candidate John Taylor Gilman won the election as he ran unopposed, thereby gaining Federalist control over the office of Governor. Gilman was sworn in as the 5th Governor of New Hampshire on June 5, 1794.

=== Results ===
New Hampshire gubernatorial election, 1794
Party	Candidate	Votes	%
Federalist	John Taylor Gilman	7,629	72.87
	Scattering	2,841	27.13
Total votes		10,470	100.00
Federalist gain from Anti-Federalist			
