= 1843 New Hampshire gubernatorial election =

- March 14, 1843
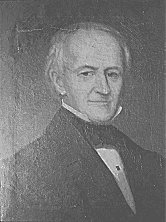

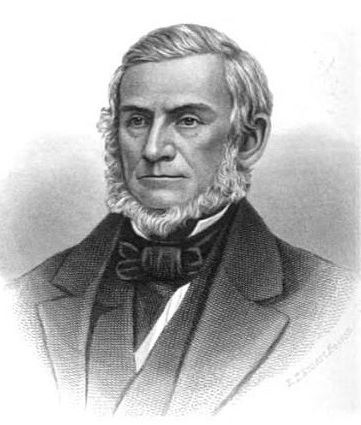
Nominee	Henry Hubbard	Anthony Colby
Party	Democratic	Whig
Popular vote	23,050	12,553
Percentage	51.58%	28.09%
Nominee	John H. White	Daniel Hoit
Party	Conservative	Liberty
Popular vote	5,597	3,392
Percentage	12.53%	7.59%
- County results Hubbard: 40–50% 50–60% 60–70% 70–80%
Governor before election
Henry Hubbard
Democratic
Elected Governor
Henry Hubbard
Democratic

The 1843 New Hampshire gubernatorial election was held on March 14, 1843, in order to elect the governor of New Hampshire. Incumbent Democratic governor Henry Hubbard won re-election against Whig nominee and former member of the New Hampshire House of Representatives Anthony Colby, Conservative nominee John H. White and Liberty nominee Daniel Hoit.

== General election ==
On election day, March 14, 1843, Democratic governor Henry Hubbard won re-election by a margin of 10,497 votes against his foremost opponent Whig nominee Anthony Colby, thereby retaining Democratic control over the office of governor. Hubbard was sworn in for his second term on June 6, 1843.

=== Results ===
New Hampshire gubernatorial election, 1843
Party	Candidate	Votes	%
Democratic	Henry Hubbard (incumbent)	23,050	51.58
Whig	Anthony Colby	12,553	28.09
Conservative	John H. White	5,597	12.53
Liberty	Daniel Hoit	3,392	7.59
	Scattering	93	0.21
Total votes		44,685	100.00
Democratic hold			
