= 1872 New Hampshire gubernatorial election =

- March 12, 1872
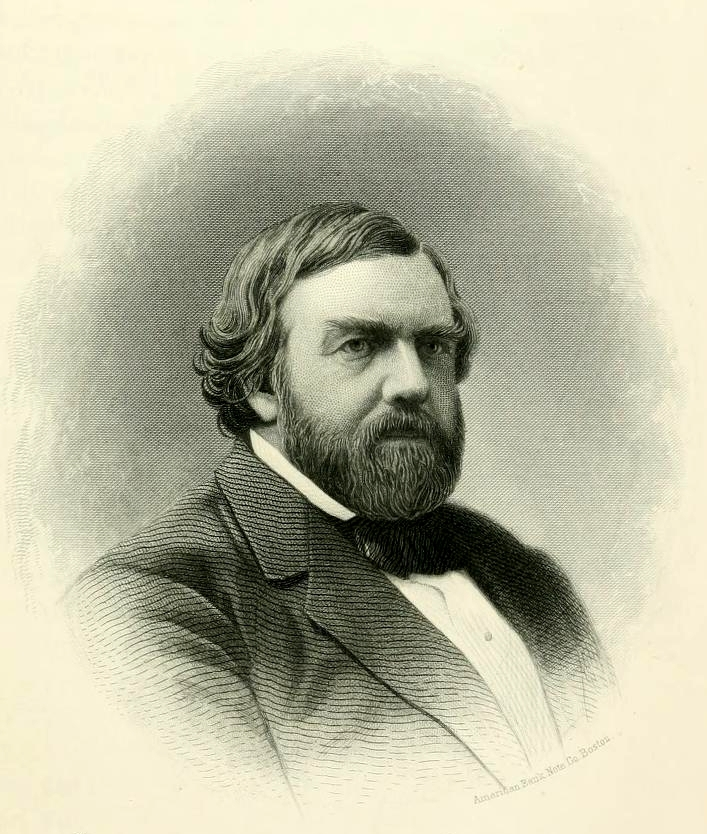

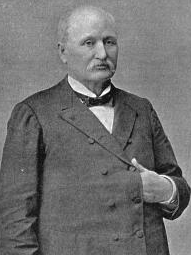
Nominee	Ezekiel A. Straw	James A. Weston
Party	Republican	Democratic
Popular vote	38,751	36,584
Percentage	50.83%	47.99%
- County results Straw: 50–60% Weston: 50–60%
Governor before election
James A. Weston
Democratic
Elected Governor
Ezekiel A. Straw
Republican

The 1872 New Hampshire gubernatorial election was held on March 12, 1872, in order to elect the governor of New Hampshire. Republican nominee and former member of the New Hampshire Senate Ezekiel A. Straw defeated incumbent Democratic governor James A. Weston, Labor Reform Party nominee Lemuel P. Cooper and Temperance nominee John Blackmer.

== General election ==
On election day, March 12, 1872, Republican nominee Ezekiel A. Straw won the election by a margin of 2,167 votes against his foremost opponent incumbent Democratic governor James A. Weston, thereby gaining Republican control over the office of governor. Straw was sworn in as the 34th governor of New Hampshire on June 5, 1872.

=== Results ===
New Hampshire gubernatorial election, 1872
Party	Candidate	Votes	%
Republican	Ezekiel A. Straw	38,751	50.83
Democratic	James A. Weston (incumbent)	36,584	47.99
Labor Reform Party	Lemuel P. Cooper	446	0.59
Prohibition	John Blackmer	436	0.57
	Scattering	14	0.02
Total votes		76,231	100.00
Republican gain from Democratic			
