= 1867 New Hampshire gubernatorial election =

- March 12, 1867
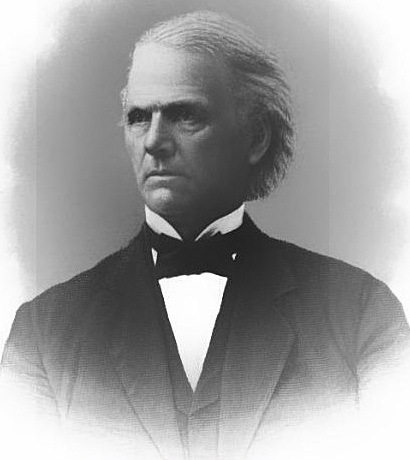

Nominee	Walter Harriman	John G. Sinclair
Party	Republican	Democratic
Popular vote	35,809	32,663
Percentage	52.19%	47.61%
- County results Harriman: 50–60% 60–70% Sinclair: 50–60%
Governor before election
Frederick Smyth
Republican
Elected Governor
Walter Harriman
Republican

The 1867 New Hampshire gubernatorial election was held on March 12, 1867, in order to elect the Governor of New Hampshire. Republican nominee and Brevet Brigadier General Walter Harriman defeated Democratic nominee John G. Sinclair.

== General election ==
On election day, March 12, 1867, Republican nominee Walter Harriman won the election by a margin of 3,146 votes against his opponent Democratic nominee John G. Sinclair, thereby retaining Republican control over the office of Governor. Harriman was sworn in as the 31st Governor of New Hampshire on June 5, 1867.

=== Results ===
New Hampshire gubernatorial election, 1867
Party	Candidate	Votes	%
Republican	Walter Harriman	35,809	52.19
Democratic	John G. Sinclair	32,663	47.61
	Scattering	136	0.20
Total votes		68,608	100.00
Republican hold			
