= 1785 New Hampshire gubernatorial election =

- March 8, 1785

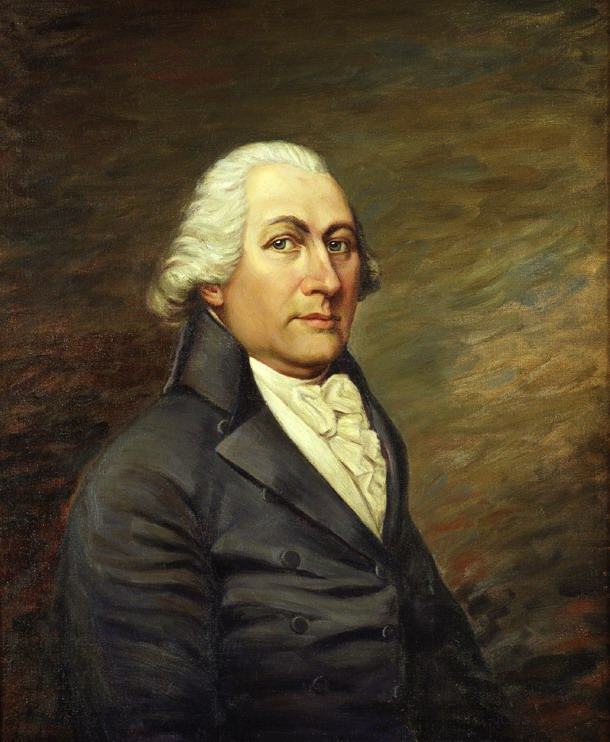

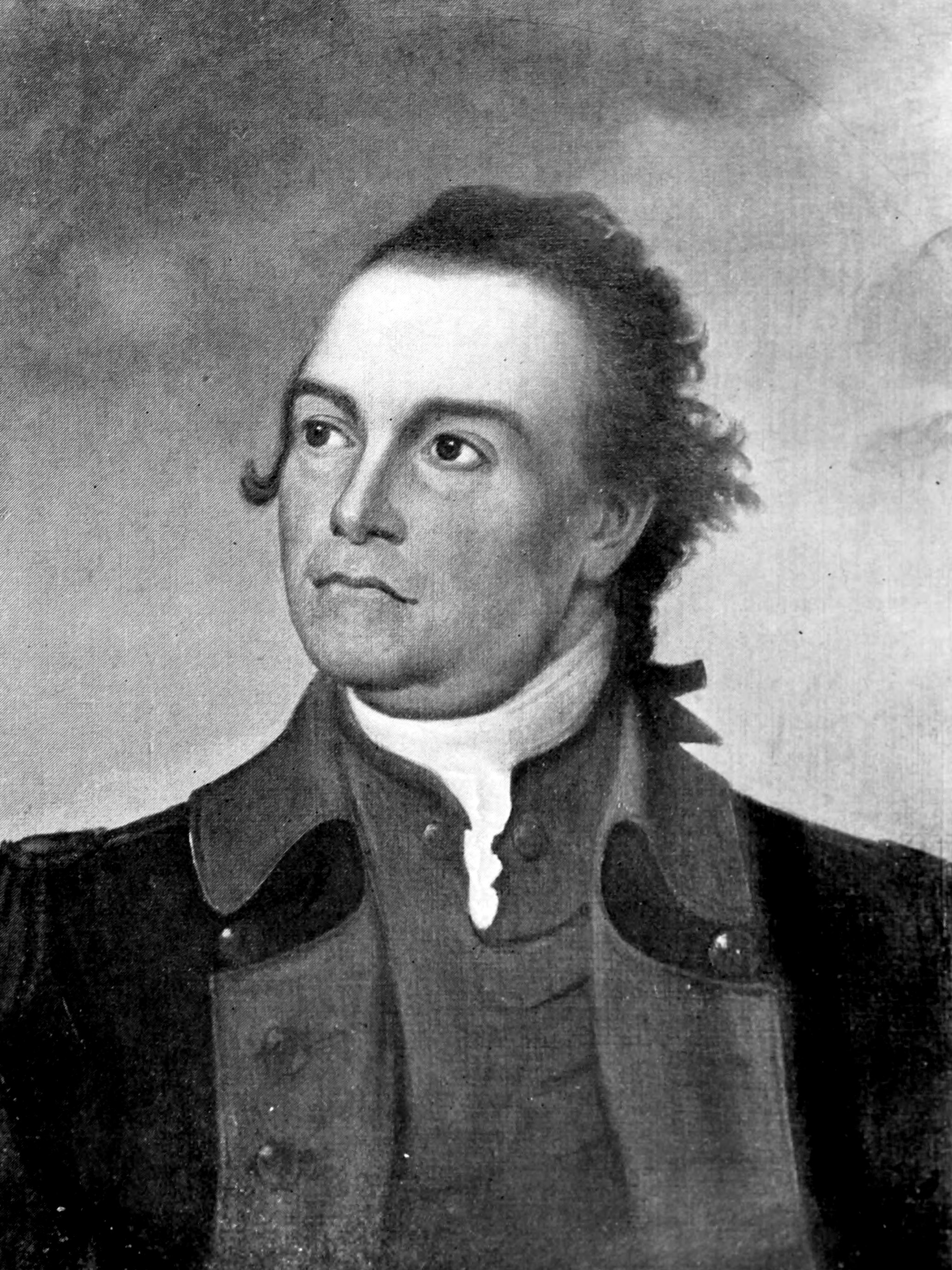

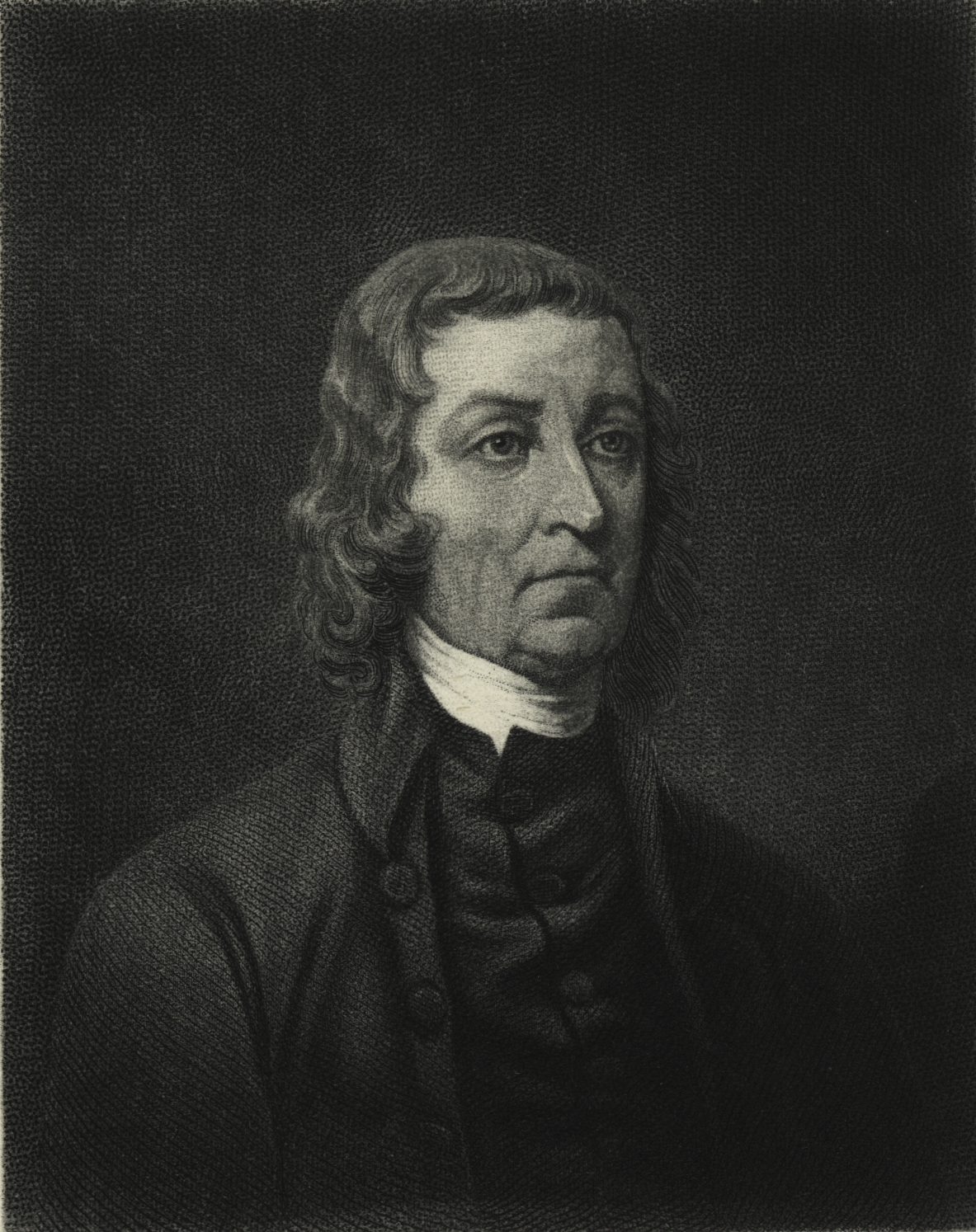
Nominee	George Atkinson	John Langdon
Party	Nonpartisan	Anti-Federalist
Popular vote	2,755	2,497
Percentage	38.92%	35.27%
Nominee	John Sullivan	Josiah Bartlett
Party	Federalist	Anti-Federalist
Popular vote	777	720
Percentage	10.98%	10.17%
President before election
Meshech Weare
Nonpartisan
Elected President
John Langdon
Anti-Federalist

The 1785 New Hampshire gubernatorial election was held on March 8, 1785, in order to elect the President of New Hampshire. (The office would be renamed to Governor in 1792.) Candidates consisted of John Langdon, George Atkinson, John Sullivan and Josiah Bartlett. Since no candidate received a majority in the popular vote, Langdon was elected by the New Hampshire General Court per the state constitution, despite having come in second in the popular vote.

== General election ==
On election day, March 8, 1785, candidate George Atkinson won the popular vote by a margin of 258 votes against his foremost opponent John Langdon. But because no candidate received a majority of the popular vote, a separate election was held by the New Hampshire General Court, which chose Langdon as the winner instead of Atkinson. Langdon was sworn in as the 2nd President of New Hampshire on June 6, 1785.

=== Results ===
New Hampshire gubernatorial election, 1785
Party	Candidate	Votes	%
Anti-Federalist	John Langdon	2,497	35.27
Nonpartisan	George Atkinson	2,755	38.92
Federalist	John Sullivan	777	10.98
Anti-Federalist	Josiah Bartlett	720	10.17
	Scattering	330	4.66
Total votes		7,079	100.00
Anti-Federalist gain from Nonpartisan			
