= 1876 New Hampshire gubernatorial election =

- March 14, 1876
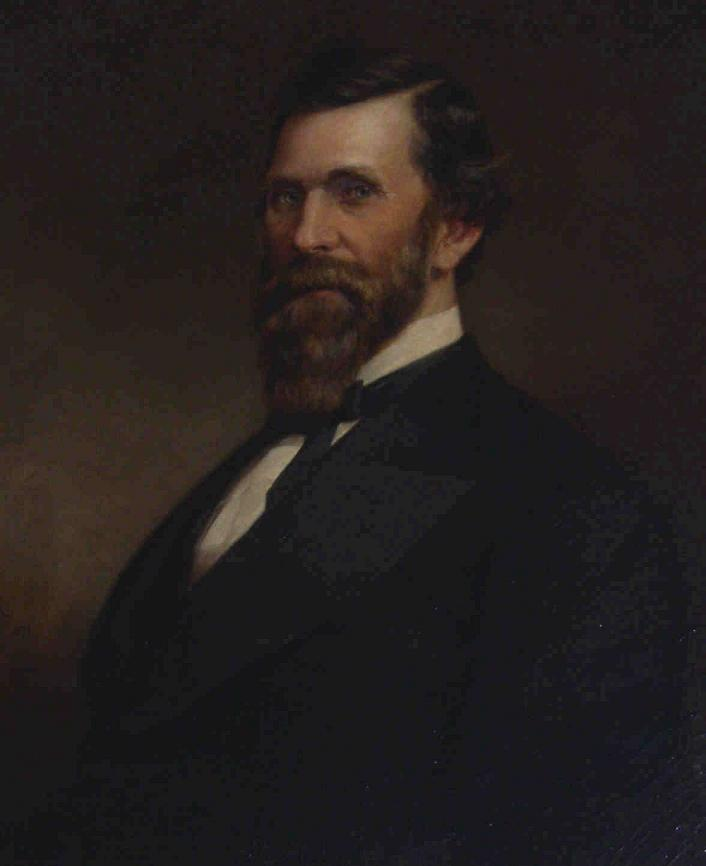

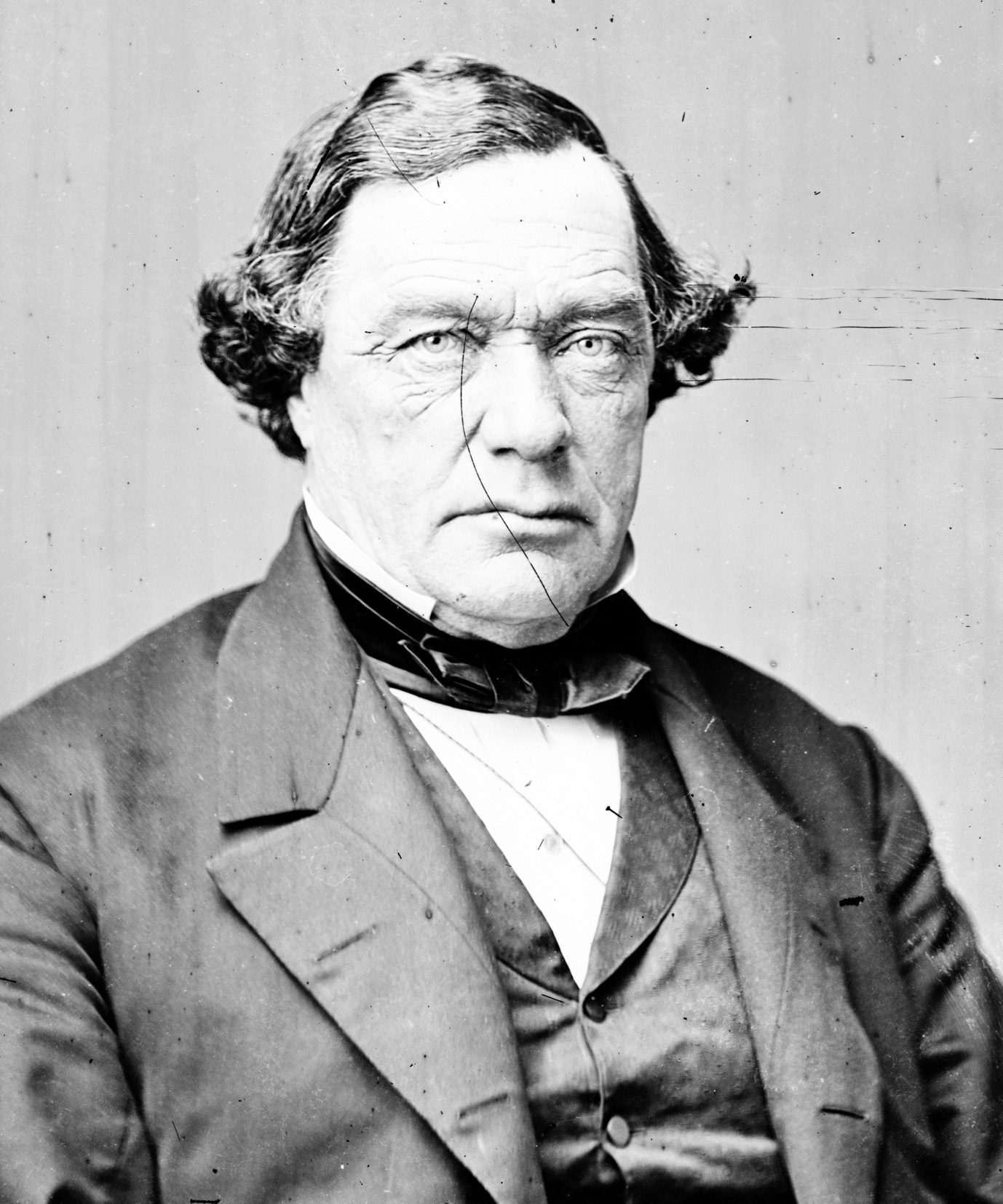
Nominee	Person Colby Cheney	Daniel Marcy
Party	Republican	Democratic
Popular vote	41,761	38,133
Percentage	51.99%	47.48%
- County results Cheney: 50–60% Marcy: 50–60%
Governor before election
Person Colby Cheney
Republican
Elected Governor
Person Colby Cheney
Republican

The 1876 New Hampshire gubernatorial election was held on March 14, 1876, in order to elect the governor of New Hampshire. Incumbent Republican governor Person Colby Cheney won re-election against Democratic nominee and former member of the U.S. House of Representatives from New Hampshire's 1st district Daniel Marcy and Temperance nominee Asa S. Kendall.

== General election ==
On election day, March 14, 1876, incumbent Republican governor Person Colby Cheney won re-election by a margin of 3,628 votes against his foremost opponent Democratic nominee Daniel Marcy, thereby retaining Republican control over the office of governor. Cheney was sworn in for his second term on June 6, 1876.

=== Results ===
New Hampshire gubernatorial election, 1876
Party	Candidate	Votes	%
Republican	Person Colby Cheney (incumbent)	41,761	51.99
Democratic	Daniel Marcy	38,133	47.48
Prohibition	Asa S. Kendall	411	0.51
	Scattering	14	0.02
Total votes		80,319	100.00
Republican hold			
