= 1848 New Hampshire gubernatorial election =

- March 8, 1848
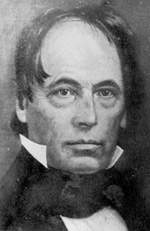

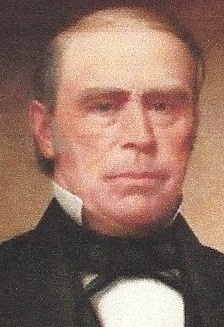
Nominee	Jared W. Williams	Nathaniel S. Berry
Party	Democratic	Whig
Popular vote	32,245	28,829
Percentage	52.40%	46.84%
- County results Williams: 50–60% 70–80% Berry: 50–60%
Governor before election
Jared W. Williams
Democratic
Elected Governor
Jared W. Williams
Democratic

The 1848 New Hampshire gubernatorial election was held on March 8, 1848, in order to elect the governor of New Hampshire. Incumbent Democratic governor Jared W. Williams won re-election against Whig nominee and former member of the New Hampshire Senate Nathaniel S. Berry.

== General election ==
On election day, March 8, 1848, Democratic governor Jared W. Williams won re-election by a margin of 3,416 votes against his opponent Whig nominee Nathaniel S. Berry, thereby retaining Democratic control over the office of governor. Williams was sworn in for his second term on June 7, 1848.

=== Results ===
New Hampshire gubernatorial election, 1848
Party	Candidate	Votes	%
Democratic	Jared W. Williams (incumbent)	32,245	52.40
Whig	Nathaniel S. Berry	28,829	46.84
	Scattering	468	0.76
Total votes		61,542	100.00
Democratic hold			
