= 1846 New Hampshire gubernatorial election =

- March 10, 1846
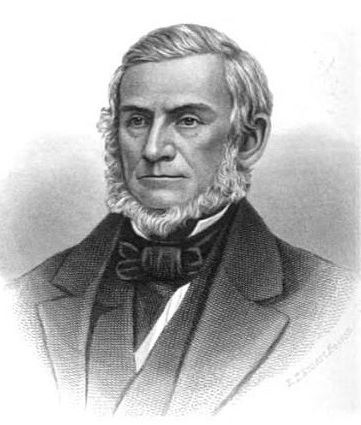

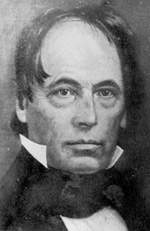

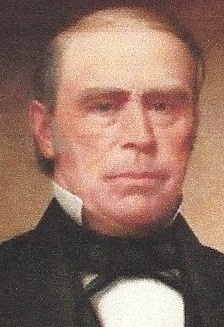
Nominee	Anthony Colby	Jared W. Williams	Nathaniel S. Berry
Party	Whig	Democratic	Liberty
Popular vote	17,737	26,740	10,403
Percentage	31.99%	48.23%	18.76%
- County results Colby: 40–50% Williams: 40–50% 50–60% 70–80%
Governor before election
John Hardy Steele
Democratic
Elected Governor
Anthony Colby
Whig

The 1846 New Hampshire gubernatorial election was held on March 10, 1846, in order to elect the Governor of New Hampshire. Whig nominee Anthony Colby defeated Democratic nominee and former member of the U.S. House of Representatives from New Hampshire's At-large district (Seat 3) Jared W. Williams and Liberty Party nominee and former member of the New Hampshire Senate Nathaniel S. Berry. Since no candidate received a majority in the popular vote, Colby was elected by the New Hampshire General Court per the state constitution, despite placing second in the popular vote.

== General election ==
On election day, March 10, 1846, Democratic nominee Jared W. Williams won the popular vote by a margin of 9,003 votes against his foremost opponent Whig nominee Anthony Colby. But because no candidate received a majority of the popular vote, a separate election was held by the New Hampshire General Court, which chose Whig nominee Anthony Colby as the winner, despite Colby having only received 31.99% of the vote and having placed second. Colby thereby gained Whig control over the office of Governor, he was sworn in as the 20th Governor of New Hampshire on June 4, 1846.

=== Results ===
New Hampshire gubernatorial election, 1846
Party	Candidate	Votes	%
Whig	Anthony Colby	17,737	31.99
Democratic	Jared W. Williams	26,740	48.23
Liberty	Nathaniel S. Berry	10,403	18.76
	Scattering	568	1.02
Total votes		55,448	100.00
Whig gain from Democratic			
