= George Sullivan (New Hampshire politician) =

American politician

George Sullivan (August 29, 1771 – April 14, 1838) was an American politician who served as a U.S. representative from New Hampshire, as well as a state representative, senator and attorney general of New Hampshire.

Born in Durham, New Hampshire, Sullivan attended Phillips Exeter Academy and was graduated from Harvard University in 1790. He studied law, was admitted to the bar, and commenced practice in Exeter, New Hampshire, in 1793. He served as member of the New Hampshire House of Representatives in 1805 and as Attorney General of New Hampshire in 1805 and 1806.

Sullivan was elected as a Federalist to the Twelfth Congress (March 4, 1811 – March 3, 1813). He was again a member of the New Hampshire House of Representatives in 1813. He served in the New Hampshire Senate in 1814 and 1815 and was again Attorney General of New Hampshire, 1816–1835. He died in Exeter, April 14, 1838, and was interred in the Old Cemetery (Winter Street).

== Personal life ==
Sullivan was the son of General John Sullivan and Lydia Worcester, and the nephew of former New Hampshire governor James Sullivan. Sullivan married Clarissa Lamson in 1780 and together they had 11 children. He died in Exeter, April 14, 1838, and was interred in the Old Cemetery (Winter Street).

U.S. House of Representatives
Preceded by James Wilson	Member of the U.S. House of Representatives from New Hampshire's At-large congressional district 1811-1813	Succeeded by Daniel Webster
