= 1806 United States gubernatorial elections =

- March 11, 1806 – December 9, 1806

10 state governorships
	Majority party	Minority party	Third party
Party	Democratic-Republican	Federalist	Independent
Last election	12 governorships	4 governorships	1 governorship
Seats before	12	4	1
Seats won	7	3	0
Seats after	12	4	1
Seat change	Steady	Steady	Steady
Seats up	7	3	0
- Results: Dem-Republican hold Federalist hold

United States gubernatorial elections were held in 1806, in ten states, concurrent with the House and Senate elections.

Five governors were elected by popular vote and five were elected by state legislatures.

== Results ==
State	Election date	Incumbent	Party	Status	Opposing candidates
Connecticut	10 April 1806 (Note: Glashan records this election as taking place on 7 April.)	Jonathan Trumbull Jr.	Federalist	Re-elected, 13,413 (58.27%) (Note: Some sources record the result as Trumbull 13,586, Hart 9,589; this includes 173 votes for Trumbull and 129 for Hart rejected by the General Assembly.)	William Hart (Democratic-Republican), 9,460 (41.10%); Scattering 144 (0.63%)
Maryland (election by legislature)	10 November 1806	Robert Bowie	Democratic-Republican	Term-limited, Democratic-Republican victory	Robert Wright (Democratic-Republican), 59 votes Charles Carroll of Carrollton (Federalist), 11 votes John Eager Howard (Federalist), 3 votes Thomas Johnson (Federalist), 1 vote
Massachusetts	7 April 1806	Caleb Strong	Federalist	Re-elected, 36,433 (50.06%) (Note: Disputed election. Many sources give the result as Strong 37,740, Sullivan 37,109, Scattering 330, but these are the results given before an investigation by the state legislature which rejected a large number of votes. The fullest account of the final result is given in the Proceedings of the Massachusetts Historical Society, 1906, cross-referenced with the town and county breakdown at A New Nation Votes.)	James Sullivan (Democratic-Republican), 36,034 (49.51%); Scattering 317 (0.44%)
New Hampshire	11 March 1806	John Langdon	Democratic-Republican	Re-elected, 15,277 (74.26%) (Note: Various sources give slightly different results for this election. The result given here is that given in the New Hampshire Senate Journal.)	Timothy Farrar (Federalist), 1,720 (8.36%); John Taylor Gilman (Federalist), 1,553 (7.55%); Jeremiah Smith (Federalist), 902 (4.38%); Oliver Peabody (Federalist), (Note: Some sources describe Peabody as a Democratic-Republican.) 866 (4.21%); Scattering 255 (1.24%)
New Jersey (election by legislature)	31 October 1806	Joseph Bloomfield	Democratic-Republican	Re-elected, unanimously	
North Carolina (election by legislature)	27 November 1806	Nathaniel Alexander	Democratic-Republican	Re-elected, "without opposition"	
Rhode Island	16 April 1806	Henry Smith (acting) (Note: As senior Senator, Smith became acting Governor on the death of Governor Arthur Fenner on 15 October 1805.)	Democratic-Republican	No choice. Lieutenant Governor of Rhode Island, Isaac Wilbour, served the term as acting Governor.	Richard Jackson Jr. (Federalist), 1,662 (43.07%); Henry Smith (Democratic-Republican), 1,097 (28.43%); Peleg Arnold (Democratic-Republican), 1,094 (28.35%); Scattering 6 (0.16%) (Legislative election) (held, 15 May 1806); Richard Jackson Jr., 16 votes Nay, 52 votes No choice made.
South Carolina (election by legislature)	9 December 1806	Paul Hamilton	Democratic-Republican	Term-limited, Democratic-Republican victory	(Second ballot); Charles Pinckney (Democratic-Republican), 73 votes Henry Middleton (Democratic-Republican), 66 votes
Vermont	2 September 1806	Isaac Tichenor	Federalist	Re-elected, 8,851 (54.97%) (Note: Some sources record the result as Tichenor 9,435, Smith 7,241, Scattering 340; this includes 584 votes for Tichenor, 311 for Smith and 20 scattering votes from 21 towns rejected by the General Assembly.)	Israel Smith (Democratic-Republican), 6,930 (43.04%); Scattering 320 (1.99%)
Virginia (election by legislature)	4 December 1806	William H. Cabell	Democratic-Republican	Re-elected, "without opposition"	

== See also ==
- 1806 United States elections

== Bibliography ==
- Glashan, Roy R. (1979). American Governors and Gubernatorial Elections, 1775-1978. Westport, CT: Meckler Books. ISBN 0-930466-17-9.
- Gubernatorial Elections, 1787-1997. Washington, D.C.: Congressional Quarterly Inc. 1998. ISBN 1-56802-396-0.
- Dubin, Michael J. (2003). United States Gubernatorial Elections, 1776-1860: The Official Results by State and County. Jefferson, North Carolina: McFarland. ISBN 978-0-7864-1439-0.
- Kallenbach, Joseph E.; Kallenbach, Jessamine S., eds. (1977). American State Governors, 1776-1976. Vol. I. Dobbs Ferry, N.Y.: Oceana Publications, Inc. ISBN 0-379-00665-0.
