= List of elections in 1806 =

The following elections occurred in the year 1806.

== North America ==
=== United States ===
- 1806 United States elections

==== United States lieutenant gubernatorial ====
- 1806 Connecticut lieutenant gubernatorial election

==== United States gubernatorial ====
- 1806 Connecticut gubernatorial election
- 1806 Maryland gubernatorial election
- 1806 Massachusetts gubernatorial election
- 1806 New Hampshire gubernatorial election
- 1806 New Jersey gubernatorial election
- 1806 North Carolina gubernatorial election
- 1806 Rhode Island gubernatorial election
- 1806 South Carolina gubernatorial election
- 1806 United States gubernatorial elections
- 1806 Vermont gubernatorial election
- 1806 Virginia gubernatorial election

==== United States Senate ====
- 1806 and 1807 United States Senate elections
- 1806 United States Senate election in Pennsylvania

==== United States House of Representatives ====
- 1806–07 United States House of Representatives elections
- 1806 United States House of Representatives election in Delaware
- 1806 United States House of Representatives election in Georgia
- 1806 United States House of Representatives elections in Maryland
- 1806 United States House of Representatives elections in Massachusetts
- 1806 Massachusetts's 4th congressional district special election
- 1806 Massachusetts's 5th congressional district special election
- 1806 United States House of Representatives election in New Hampshire
- 1806 United States House of Representatives election in New Jersey
- 1806 United States House of Representatives elections in New York
- 1806 New York's 2nd congressional district special election
- 1806 New York's 3rd congressional district special election
- 1806 United States House of Representatives elections in Ohio
- 1806 United States House of Representatives elections in Pennsylvania
- 1806 Pennsylvania's 4th congressional district special election
- 1806 United States House of Representatives elections in South Carolina
- 1806 South Carolina's 6th congressional district special election
- 1806 United States House of Representatives election in Vermont

== Europe ==
=== United Kingdom ===
- 1806 United Kingdom general election

== See also ==
- Category:1806 elections
