= 1808 New Hampshire gubernatorial election =

- March 8, 1808
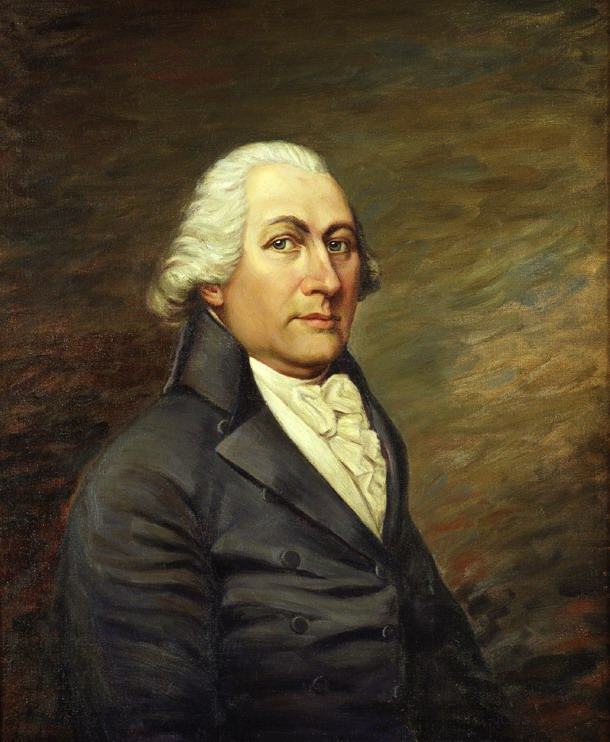

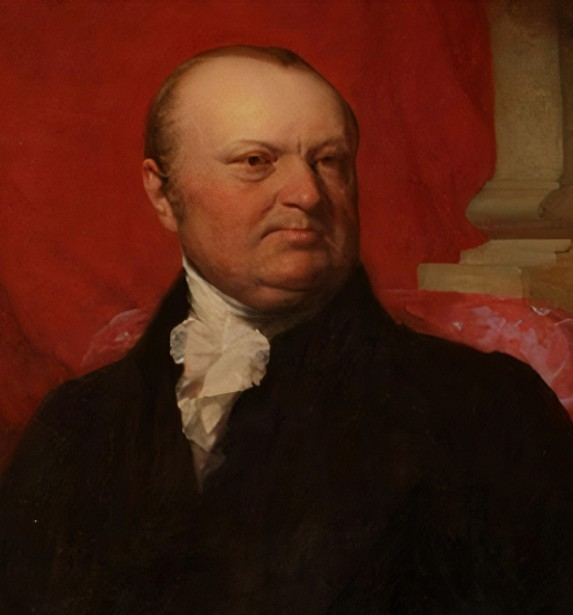

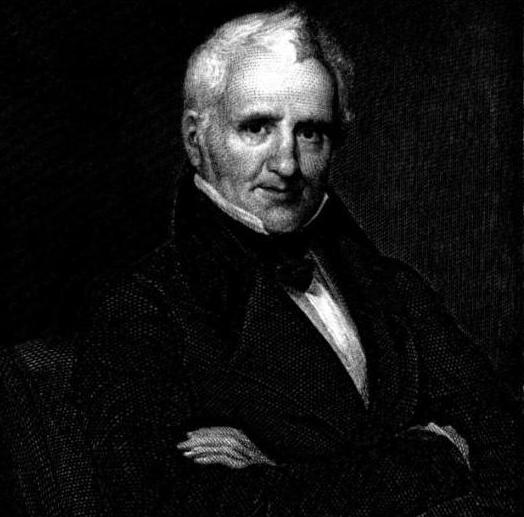
Nominee	John Langdon	John Taylor Gilman	Jeremiah Smith
Party	Democratic-Republican	Federalist	Federalist
Popular vote	12,641	1,261	839
Percentage	79.51%	7.93%	5.28%
- County results Langdon: 80–90% 90–100%
Governor before election
John Langdon
Democratic-Republican
Elected Governor
John Langdon
Democratic-Republican

The 1808 New Hampshire gubernatorial election was held on March 8, 1808.

Incumbent Democratic-Republican Governor John Langdon won re-election to a fourth term.

== General election ==
=== Major candidates ===
- John Langdon, Democratic-Republican, incumbent Governor

=== Minor candidates ===
The following candidates may not have been formally nominated and attracted only scattering votes.

- Timothy Farrar, Chief Justice of the Court of Common Pleas for Hillsborough County, former justice of the New Hampshire Superior Court of Judicature
- John Taylor Gilman, Federalist, former Governor
- William Hale, Federalist, former member of the Executive Council of New Hampshire
- Oliver Peabody, Federalist, former President of the New Hampshire Senate
- Jeremiah Smith, Federalist, Chief Justice of the New Hampshire Superior Court of Judicature

=== Results ===
1808 New Hampshire gubernatorial election (Note: Some sources give slightly different results. The result given is taken from the New Hampshire Senate Journal.)
Party	Candidate	Votes	%	±%
Democratic-Republican	John Langdon (incumbent)	12,641	79.51%	
Federalist	John Taylor Gilman	1,261	7.93%	
Federalist	Jeremiah Smith	839	5.28%	
Federalist	Oliver Peabody	405	2.55%	
Federalist	Timothy Farrar	398	2.50%	
Scattering		355	2.23%	
Majority		11,380	71.58%	
Turnout		15,899		
Democratic-Republican hold		Swing		
