= 1812 New Hampshire gubernatorial election =

- March 10, 1812
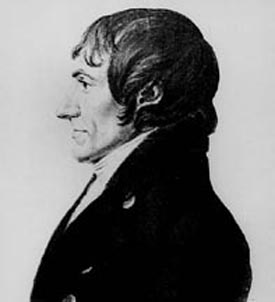

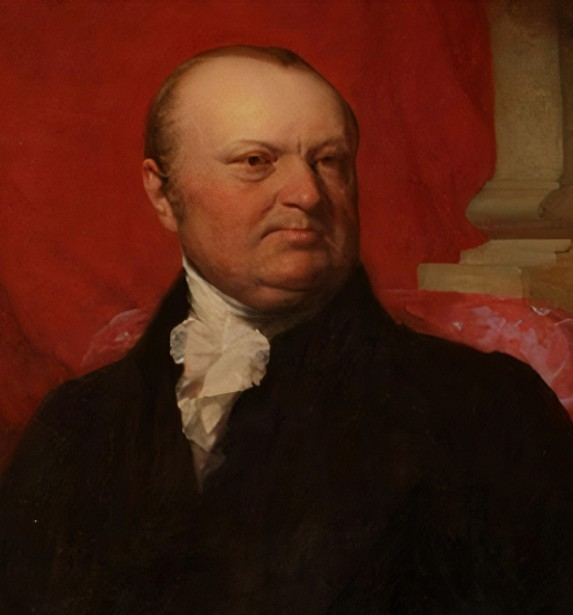
Nominee	William Plumer	John Taylor Gilman
Party	Democratic-Republican	Federalist
Electoral vote	104	82
Popular vote	15,492	15,613
Percentage	48.44%	48.82%
- County results Plumer: 50–60% 60–70% Gilman: 50–60%
Governor before election
John Langdon
Democratic-Republican
Elected Governor
William Plumer
Democratic-Republican

The 1812 New Hampshire gubernatorial election was held on March 10, 1812.

Incumbent Governor John Langdon did not run for re-election.

Democratic-Republican candidate William Plumer defeated Federalist candidate and Former Governor of New Hampshire John Taylor Gilman.

Since no candidate received a majority in the popular vote, Plumer was elected by the New Hampshire General Court per the state constitution.

== General election ==
=== Candidates ===
- John Taylor Gilman, Federalist, former Governor
- William Plumer, Democratic-Republican, former U.S. Senator, former President of the New Hampshire Senate

=== Results ===
1812 New Hampshire gubernatorial election (Note: Some sources give slightly different votes for Gilman. The result given is taken from the New Hampshire Senate Journal.)
Party	Candidate	Votes	%	±%
Federalist	John Taylor Gilman	15,613	48.82%	
Democratic-Republican	William Plumer	15,492	48.44%	
Scattering		877	2.74%	
Majority		121	0.38%	
Turnout		31,982		

=== Legislative election ===
As no candidate received a majority of the vote, the New Hampshire General Court was required to decide the election, both Houses in convention choosing among the top two vote-getters, Gilman and Plumer. The legislative election was held on June 4, 1812.

Legislative election
Party	Candidate	Votes	%
Democratic-Republican	William Plumer	104	55.91%
Federalist	John Taylor Gilman	82	44.09%
Turnout		186	
Democratic-Republican hold			
