= 1817 New Hampshire gubernatorial election =

- March 11, 1817
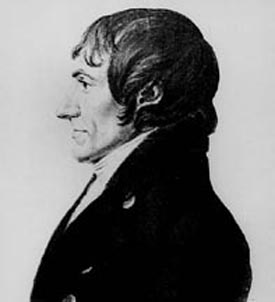

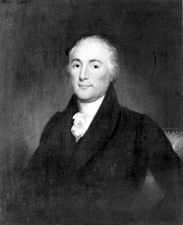

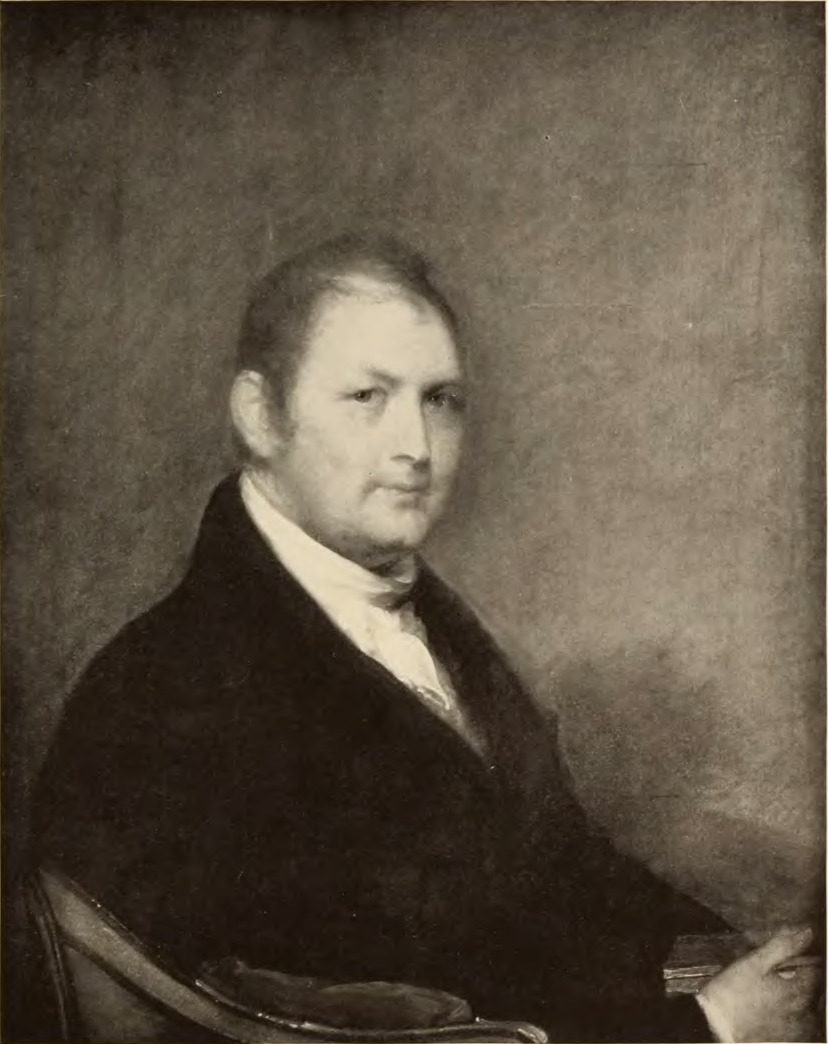
Nominee	William Plumer	James Sheafe	Jeremiah Mason
Party	Democratic-Republican	Federalist	Federalist
Popular vote	19,088	12,029	3,607
Percentage	53.96%	34.00%	10.20%
- County results Plumer: 50–60% 60–70% Sheafe: 50–60% Mason: 40–50%
Governor before election
William Plumer
Democratic-Republican
Elected Governor
William Plumer
Democratic-Republican

The 1817 New Hampshire gubernatorial election was held on March 11, 1817.

Incumbent Democratic-Republican Governor William Plumer defeated Federalist nominees James Sheafe and Jeremiah Mason.

== General election ==
=== Major candidates ===
- William Plumer, Democratic-Republican, incumbent Governor
- James Sheafe, Federalist, former U.S. Senator, Federalist nominee for Governor in 1816

=== Minor candidates ===
The following candidates may not have been formally nominated and attracted only scattering votes.

- Josiah Bartlett Jr., Democratic-Republican, former U.S. Representative
- Jeremiah Mason, Federalist, incumbent U.S. Senator

=== Results ===
1817 New Hampshire gubernatorial election (Note: Some sources give slightly different votes for Bartlett and Mason. The result given is taken from the New Hampshire Senate Journal.)
Party	Candidate	Votes	%	±%
Democratic-Republican	William Plumer (incumbent)	19,088	53.96%	
Federalist	James Sheafe	12,029	34.00%	
Federalist	Jeremiah Mason	3,607	10.20%	
Democratic-Republican	Josiah Bartlett Jr.	539	1.52%	
Scattering		112	0.32%	
Majority		7,059	19.95%	
Turnout		35,375		
Democratic-Republican hold		Swing		
