= 1807 New Hampshire gubernatorial election =

- March 10, 1807
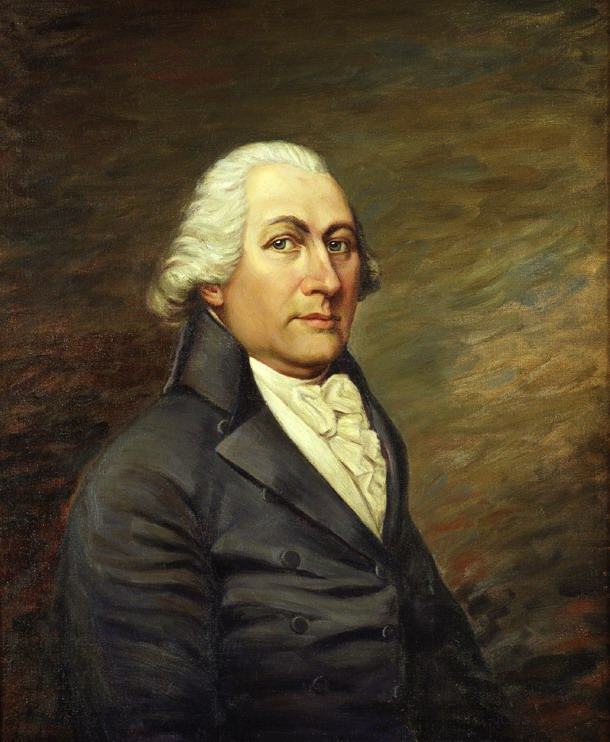
Nominee	John Langdon
Party	Democratic-Republican
Popular vote	13,912
Percentage	82.51%
- County results Langdon: 70–80% 80–90% 90–100%
Governor before election
John Langdon
Democratic-Republican
Elected Governor
John Langdon
Democratic-Republican

The 1807 New Hampshire gubernatorial election was held on March 10, 1807.

Incumbent Democratic-Republican Governor John Langdon won re-election to a third term.

== General election ==
=== Major candidates ===
- John Langdon, Democratic-Republican, incumbent Governor

=== Minor candidates ===
The following candidates may not have been formally nominated and attracted only scattering votes.

- Timothy Farrar, Chief Justice of the Court of Common Pleas for Hillsborough County, former justice of the New Hampshire Superior Court of Judicature
- John Taylor Gilman, Federalist, former Governor
- Oliver Peabody, Federalist, former President of the New Hampshire Senate
- Jeremiah Smith, Federalist, Chief Justice of the New Hampshire Superior Court of Judicature

=== Results ===
1807 New Hampshire gubernatorial election (Note: Some sources give slightly different results. The result given is taken from the New Hampshire Senate Journal.)
Party	Candidate	Votes	%	±%
Democratic-Republican	John Langdon (incumbent)	13,912	82.51%	
Scattering		2,949 (Note: A New Nation Votes indicates scattering votes break down as: John T. Gilman 1,204, Jeremiah Smith 647, Timothy Farrar 603, Oliver Peabody 412.)	17.49%	
Majority		10,963	65.02%	
Turnout		16,861		
Democratic-Republican hold		Swing		
