= 1798 New Hampshire gubernatorial election =

- March 13, 1798
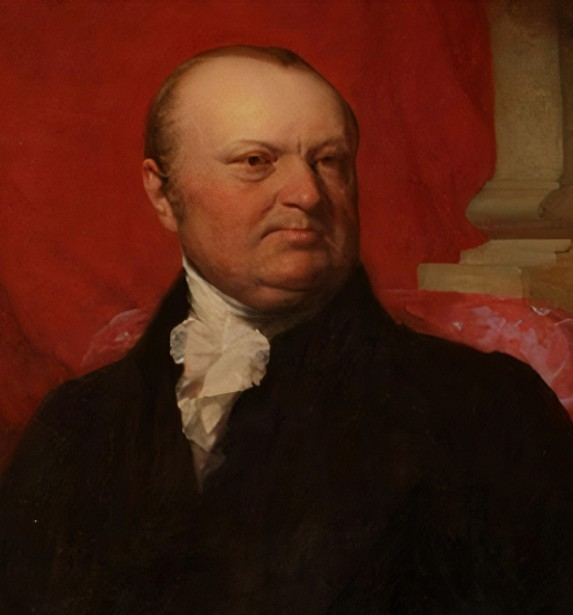

Nominee	John Taylor Gilman	Oliver Peabody	Timothy Walker
Party	Federalist	Democratic-Republican	Democratic-Republican
Popular vote	9,397	1,189	734
Percentage	77.32%	9.78%	6.04%
Governor before election
John Taylor Gilman
Federalist
Elected Governor
John Taylor Gilman
Federalist

The 1798 New Hampshire gubernatorial election took place on March 13, 1798. Incumbent Federalist Governor John Taylor Gilman won re-election to a fifth term, easily defeating various minor candidates.

== Results ==
1798 New Hampshire gubernatorial election
Party	Candidate	Votes	%	±%
Federalist	John Taylor Gilman (incumbent)	9,397	77.32%	
Democratic-Republican	Oliver Peabody (Note: Glashan and A New Nation Votes describe Peabody as a Federalist.)	1,189	9.78%	
Democratic-Republican	Timothy Walker	734	6.04%	
Democratic-Republican	John Langdon	364	3.00%	
Federalist	Simeon Olcott (Note: A New Nation Votes describes Olcott as a Republican. However, he later served as a Federalist Senator and is described in one source as a "staunch Federalist".)	146	1.20%	
Scattering		323	2.66%	
Majority		8,208	67.54%	
Turnout		12,153	100.00%	
Federalist hold		Swing		
