= Governor John Langdon House =

Historic house in New Hampshire, United States

- Gov. John Langdon Mansion
- U.S. National Register of Historic Places
- U.S. National Historic Landmark
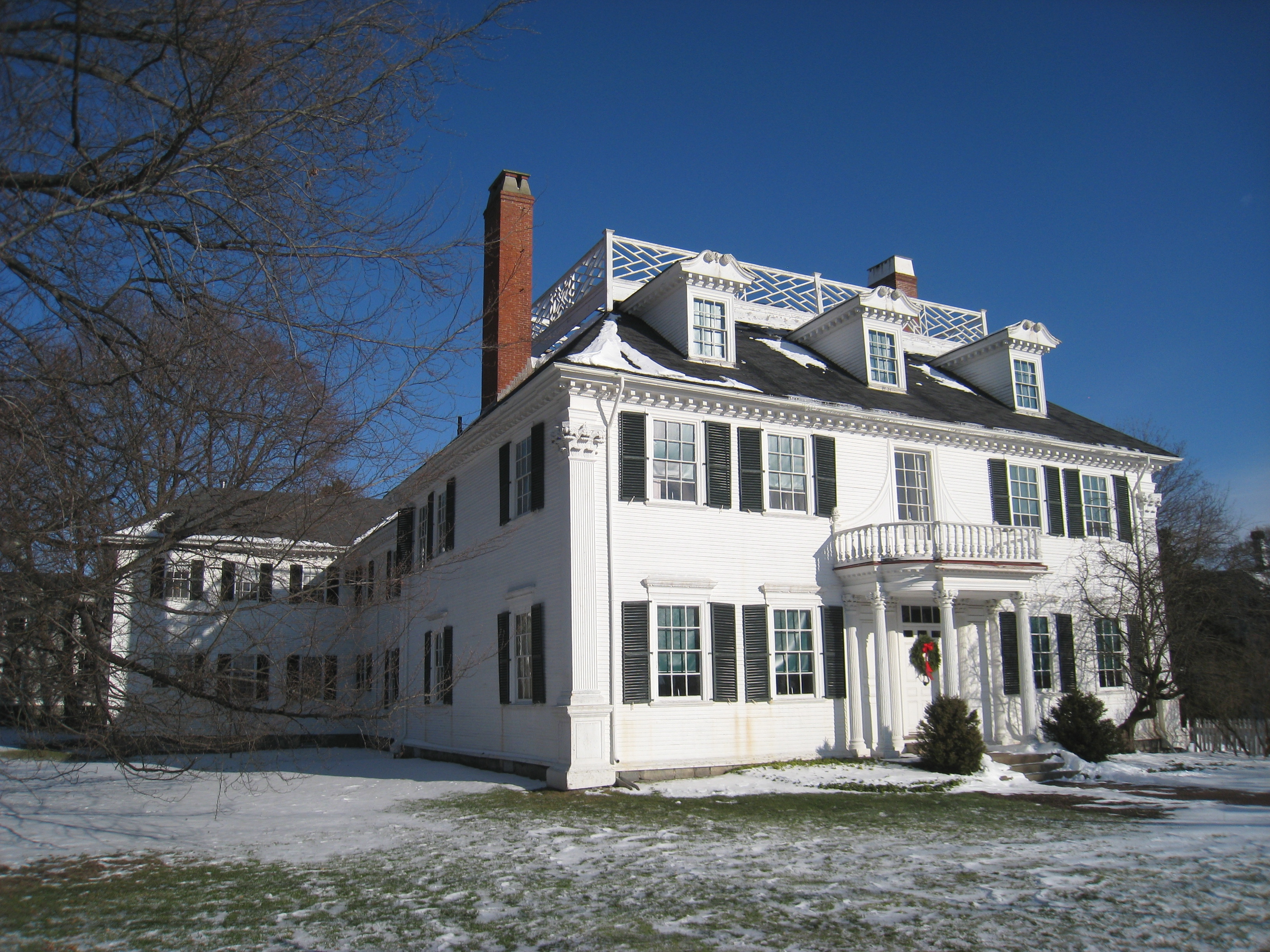

- Location within New Hampshire Location within the United States
- Location: 143 Pleasant Street, Portsmouth, New Hampshire
- Coordinates: 43°4′31″N 70°45′23″W
- Built: 1784
- Architectural style: Georgian
- NRHP reference No.: 74000197

Significant dates
- Added to NRHP: December 2, 1974
- Designated NHL: December 2, 1974

The Governor John Langdon House, also known as Governor John Langdon Mansion, is a historic mansion house at 143 Pleasant Street in Portsmouth, New Hampshire, United States. It was built in 1784 by Founding Father John Langdon (1741-1819), a merchant, shipbuilder, American Revolutionary War general, signer of the United States Constitution, and three-term President (now termed governor) of New Hampshire. The house he built for his family showed his status as Portsmouth's leading citizen and received praise from George Washington, who visited there in 1789. Its reception rooms are ornamented by elaborate wood carving in the rococo style. The house was declared a National Historic Landmark in 1974, and is now a house museum operated by Historic New England.

The house Langdon had built resembles typical late Georgian houses, with five bays across, a center entry, and four rooms on each floor, flanking a grand central hall and stairway. It is built on a larger and grander scale than most houses, and has very high quality interior woodwork. The interior joinery is attributed to Ebenezer Clifford, a leading woodworker of the Portsmouth area. The main entry is also particularly elaborate with a large door flanked by pairs of engaged columns, and sheltered by a semi-circular portico supported by Corinthian columns and topped by a balustrade.

After Langdon's death in 1819, his lone surviving daughter continued to use the house, but did not live there. Between 1833 and 1902 the house passed through several hands. In the 1850s a fire severely damaged the southwest corner of the house, which was reconstructed. In 1877 the house came into the hands of Frances E. Bassett, a descendant of John Langdon's brother Woodbury. Her son and daughter-in-law, Woodbury and Elizabeth Langdon, converted the house into a Colonial Revival showplace, adding a two-story wing designed by McKim, Mead & White whose details harmonize well with the original structure, and include a dining room based on one built by the ancestral Woodbury Langdon and preserved in the Rockingham Hotel. Elizabeth Langdon deeded the property to Historic New England in 1947.

The house was declared a National Historic Landmark in 1974. It is open to the public for tours on weekends from June to October, and the grounds are available for functions.

== See also ==
- List of National Historic Landmarks in New Hampshire
- National Register of Historic Places listings in Rockingham County, New Hampshire
