= James Sheafe =

American politician (1755–1829)

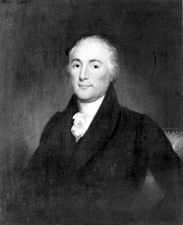

United States Senator from New Hampshire
- In office March 4, 1801 – June 14, 1802
- Preceded by: John Langdon
- Succeeded by: William Plumer

Member of the U.S. House of Representatives from New Hampshire's at-large district (Seat 1)
- In office March 4, 1799 – March 3, 1801
- Preceded by: Peleg Sprague
- Succeeded by: George B. Upham

Member of the New Hampshire Senate
- In office 1791; 1793; 1799

Member of the New Hampshire House of Representatives
- In office 1788–1790

Personal details
- Born: November 16, 1755 Portsmouth, Province of New Hampshire, British America
- Died: December 5, 1829 (aged 74) Portsmouth, New Hampshire, U.S.
- Party: Federalist
- Education: Harvard University

James Sheafe (November 16, 1755 – December 5, 1829) was a United States representative and senator from New Hampshire. Born in Portsmouth in the Province of New Hampshire, he completed preparatory studies and graduated from Harvard College in 1774. He engaged in mercantile pursuits, was a member of the New Hampshire House of Representatives from 1788 to 1790, a member of the New Hampshire Senate in 1791, 1793 and 1799, and a member of the state Executive Council in 1799. He was an unsuccessful candidate in both the 1789 special election and 1790 election for New Hampshire's at-large congressional district.

Sheafe was elected as a Federalist to the Sixth Congress (March 4, 1799 – March 3, 1801); he was then elected to the U.S. Senate and served from March 4, 1801, until his resignation on June 14, 1802. He was an unsuccessful candidate for Governor of New Hampshire in 1816 and died in Portsmouth; interment was in St. John's Church Cemetery.

In 1815, Sheafe was elected a member of the American Antiquarian Society.

Party political offices
Preceded by John Taylor Gilman	Federalist nominee for Governor of New Hampshire; 1816, 1817	Succeeded by Jeremiah Mason
U.S. Senate
Preceded by John Langdon	U.S. senator (Class 3) from New Hampshire; 1801–1802; Served alongside: Samuel Livermore, Simeon Olcott	Succeeded by William Plumer
U.S. House of Representatives
Preceded by Peleg Sprague	Member of the House of Representatives from New Hampshire's at-large (Seat 1) congressional district 1799-1801	Succeeded by George B. Upham
