= 1816 New Hampshire gubernatorial election =

- March 12, 1816
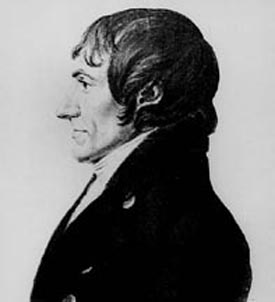

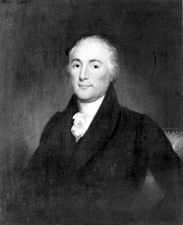
Nominee	William Plumer	James Sheafe
Party	Democratic-Republican	Federalist
Popular vote	20,338	17,994
Percentage	52.95%	46.85%
- County results Plumer: 50–60% 60–70% Sheafe: 50–60%
Governor before election
John Taylor Gilman
Federalist
Elected Governor
William Plumer
Democratic-Republican

The 1816 New Hampshire gubernatorial election was held on March 12, 1816.

Incumbent Federalist Governor John Taylor Gilman did not run for re-election.

Democratic-Republican nominee William Plumer defeated Federalist nominee James Sheafe.

== General election ==
=== Candidates ===
- William Plumer, Democratic-Republican, former Governor
- James Sheafe, Federalist, former U.S. Senator

=== Results ===
1816 New Hampshire gubernatorial election
Party	Candidate	Votes	%	±%
Democratic-Republican	William Plumer	20,338	52.95%	
Federalist	James Sheafe	17,994	46.85%	
Scattering		75	0.20%	
Majority		2,344	6.10%	
Turnout		38,407		
Democratic-Republican gain from Federalist		Swing		
