= William Plumer =

American politician (1759–1850)

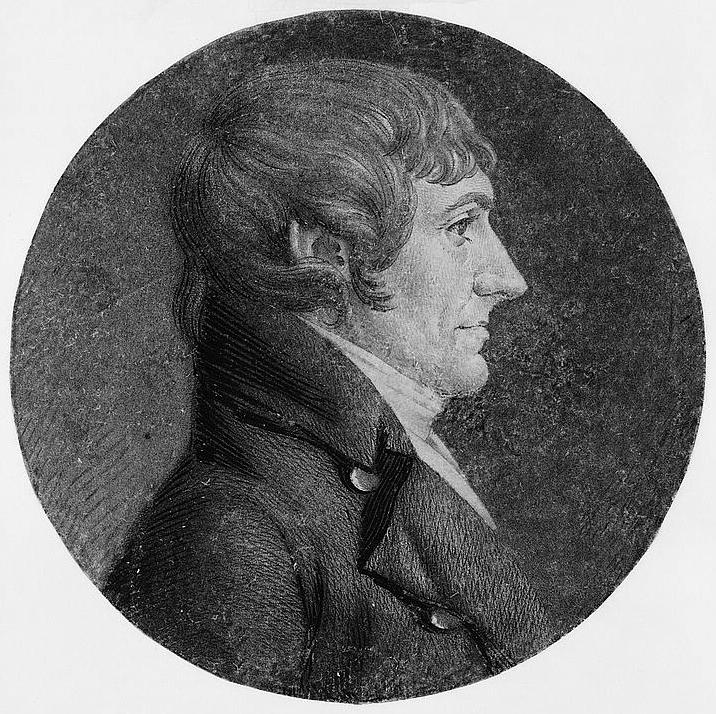

United States Senator from New Hampshire
- In office June 17, 1802 – March 3, 1807
- Preceded by: James Sheafe
- Succeeded by: Nahum Parker

7th Governor of New Hampshire
- In office June 5, 1812 – June 3, 1813
- Preceded by: John Langdon
- Succeeded by: John T. Gilman
- In office June 6, 1816 – June 3, 1819
- Preceded by: John T. Gilman
- Succeeded by: Samuel Bell

Member of the New Hampshire House of Representatives
- In office 1788; 1790–1791; 1797–1800

Personal details
- Born: June 25, 1759 Newburyport, Province of Massachusetts Bay, British America
- Died: December 22, 1850 (aged 91) Epping, New Hampshire, U.S.
- Party: Democratic-Republican
- Other political affiliations: Federalist
- Spouse: Sarah Fowler Plumer (1762–1852)
- Relations: Adelaide Cilley Waldron, niece
- Children: William Plumer, Jr.
- Education: Newburyport South Writing School
- Profession: Attorney

William Plumer (June 25, 1759 – December 22, 1850) was an American lawyer, Baptist lay preacher, and politician from Epping, New Hampshire. He is most notable for his service as a Federalist in the United States Senate (1802–1807), and the seventh governor of New Hampshire as a Democratic-Republican (1812–1813, 1816–1819).

== Early life ==
Plumer was born in Newburyport, Province of Massachusetts Bay on June 25, 1759, the son of farmer and merchant Samuel Plumer and Mary (Dole) Plumer. His family moved to Epping, New Hampshire, in 1768, and he was raised at his father's farm on Epping's Red Oak Hill. Plumer attended the Red Oak Hill School until he was 17.

Frequent ill health left him unsuited for military service during the American Revolution or life as a farmer, and after a religious conversion experience in his late teens, Plumer was trained as a Baptist exhorter (a lay preacher). For several years he traveled throughout the state to deliver sermons to Baptist churches and revival meetings. He briefly considered a career as a doctor, and began to study medicine. Later deciding on a legal career, he studied law with attorneys Joshua Atherton of Amherst and John Prentice of Londonderry. While studying under Atherton, his fellow law clerks included William Coleman, who remained a lifelong friend. Plumer attained admission to the bar in 1787, and began to practice in Epping.

== Early career ==
In addition to practicing law, Plumer was active in local politics and government. He held several town offices, including selectman. Plumer served in the New Hampshire House of Representatives from 1785 to 1786, in 1788, from 1790 to 1791, and from 1797 to 1800. In 1791 and 1797 he served as Speaker of the House. Plumer was a delegate to the state constitutional convention of 1791-1792.

== US Senate ==
Plumer was elected to the US Senate as a Federalist and filled the vacancy caused by the resignation of James Sheafe. Plumer served from June 17, 1802, to March 3, 1807, and was not a candidate for re-election.

In 1803, Plumer was one of several New England Federalists to propose secession from the United States because of the lack of power by Federalists, the rising influence of Jeffersonian Democrats, and the diminished influence of the North since the Louisiana Purchase. Recalling, in 1827, his involvement in the secession scheme, Plumer said, "This was, I think, the greatest political error of my life: & would, had it been reduced to practise [sic], instead of releiving [sic], destroyed New England.... Fortunately for my own reputation the erroneous opinion I formed produced no bitter fruits to myself or my country."

== New Hampshire Senate ==
Plumer served in the New Hampshire Senate in 1810 and 1811, and was chosen in both years to serve as the Senate's president.

== Governor ==
By now a Democratic-Republican, in 1812, Plumer was the party's successful nominee for Governor of New Hampshire, and he served until 1813. He returned to office in 1816, and served until 1819.

== Presidential elector, 1820 ==
In the 1820 presidential election, Plumer was one of New Hampshire's electoral college members. He cast the only dissenting vote in the Electoral College against incumbent President James Monroe, voting instead for John Quincy Adams. Some accounts say that it was to ensure that George Washington remained the only US president to be unanimously chosen by the Electoral College, but others assert that he was instead calling attention to his friend Adams as a potential future presidential candidate or was protesting against the "wasteful extravagance" of the Monroe administration. Plumer also eschewed voting for Daniel D. Tompkins for Vice President as "grossly intemperate" and having "not that weight of character which his office requires" and "because he grossly neglected his duty" in his "only" official role as president of the Senate by being "absent nearly three-fourths of the time." Plumer instead voted for Richard Rush.

== Other activities ==
Plumer was a founder and the first president of the New Hampshire Historical Society. He was elected a member of the American Antiquarian Society in 1815.

== Death and burial ==
Plumer died in Epping on December 22, 1850, and was buried at the Plumer Family Cemetery in Epping.

== Family ==
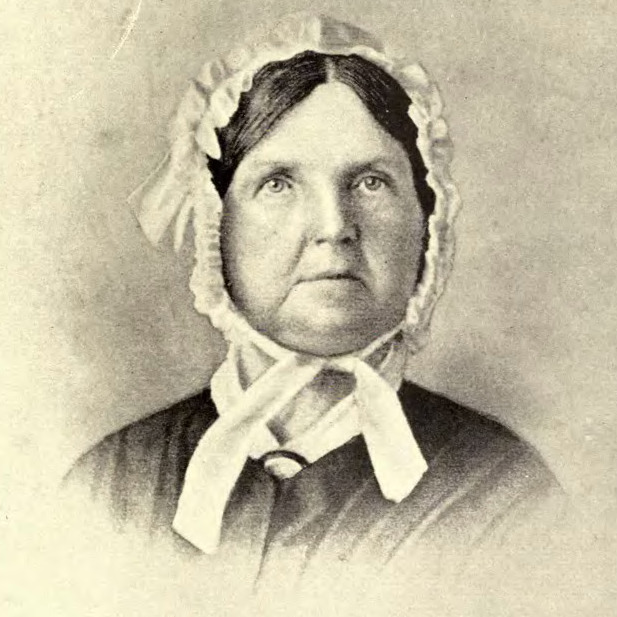
Sally Fowler Plumer

In 1788, Plumer married Sarah "Sally" Fowler of Newmarket, New Hampshire. They were the parents of six children—William, Sally, Samuel, George Washington, John Jay, and Quintus. William Plumer Jr. was an author and attorney who served in the United States House of Representatives from 1819 to 1825.

== See also ==
- Paper Money Riot

Party political offices
| Preceded by John Langdon | Democratic-Republican nominee for Governor of New Hampshire; 1812, 1813, 1814, 1815, 1816, 1817, 1818 | Succeeded by Samuel Bell |
U.S. Senate
| Preceded by James Sheafe | U.S. senator (Class 3) from New Hampshire; 1802–1807; Served alongside: Simeon Olcott, Nicholas Gilman | Succeeded by Nahum Parker |
Political offices
| Preceded by John Langdon | Governor of New Hampshire; 1812–1813 | Succeeded by John Taylor Gilman |
| Preceded by John Taylor Gilman | Governor of New Hampshire; 1816–1819 | Succeeded by Samuel Bell |
Honorary titles
| Preceded by Asher Robbins | Oldest living U.S. senator February 25, 1845 – December 22, 1850 | Succeeded by David Daggett |
| Preceded by Albert Gallatin | Most senior living U.S. senator (Sitting or former); August 12, 1849 – December 22, 1850 | Succeeded by Henry Clay |
| Preceded by Morgan Lewis | Oldest living United States governor April 7, 1844 – December 22, 1850 | Succeeded by Joshua Hall |
| Preceded by Morgan Lewis | Oldest United States governor ever December 17, 1848 – April 19, 1860 | Succeeded by Joshua Hall |
