= 1813 New Hampshire gubernatorial election =

- March 9, 1813
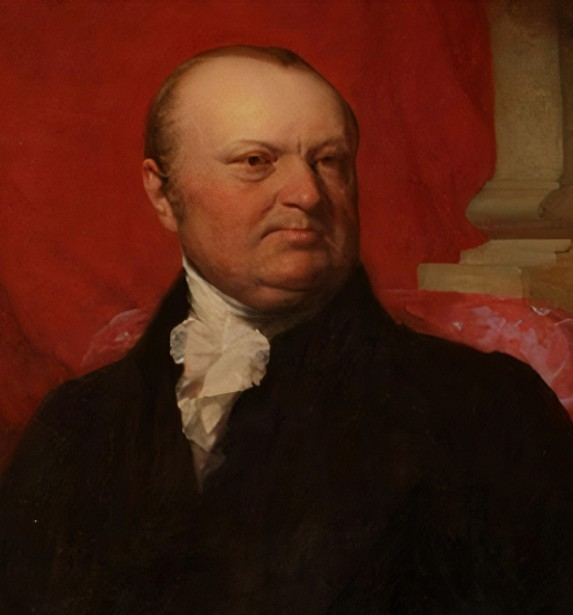

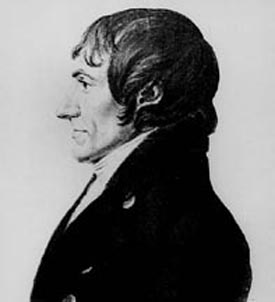
Nominee	John Taylor Gilman	William Plumer
Party	Federalist	Democratic-Republican
Popular vote	18,107	17,410
Percentage	50.68%	48.73%
- County results Gilman: 50–60% 60–70% Plumer: 50–60% 90–100%
Governor before election
William Plumer
Democratic-Republican
Elected Governor
John Taylor Gilman
Federalist

The 1813 New Hampshire gubernatorial election was held on March 9, 1813.

Incumbent Democratic-Republican Governor William Plumer was defeated by Federalist nominee John Taylor Gilman.

== General election ==
=== Candidates ===
- John Taylor Gilman, Federalist, former Governor
- William Plumer, Democratic-Republican, incumbent Governor

=== Results ===
1813 New Hampshire gubernatorial election (Note: Some sources give slightly different results. The result given is taken from the New Hampshire Senate Journal.)
Party	Candidate	Votes	%	±%
Federalist	John Taylor Gilman	18,107	50.68%	
Democratic-Republican	William Plumer (incumbent)	17,410	48.73%	
Scattering		212	0.59%	
Majority		697	1.95%	
Turnout		35,729		
Federalist gain from Democratic-Republican		Swing		
