= 1815 New Hampshire gubernatorial election =

- March 14, 1815
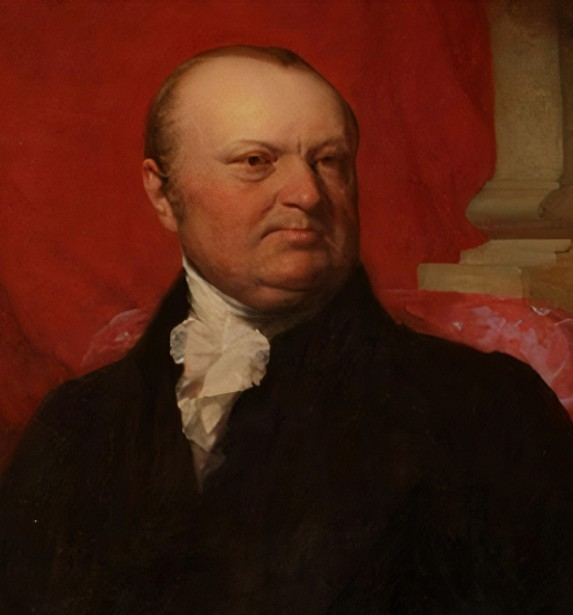

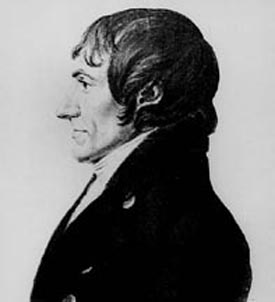
Nominee	John Taylor Gilman	William Plumer
Party	Federalist	Democratic-Republican
Popular vote	18,357	17,799
Percentage	50.72%	49.18%
- County results Gilman: 50–60% 60–70% Plumer: 50–60%
Governor before election
John Taylor Gilman
Federalist
Elected Governor
John Taylor Gilman
Federalist

The 1815 New Hampshire gubernatorial election was held on March 14, 1815.

Incumbent Federalist Governor John Taylor Gilman defeated Democratic-Republican nominee William Plumer in a re-match of the previous year's election.

== General election ==
=== Candidates ===
- John Taylor Gilman, Federalist, incumbent Governor
- William Plumer, Democratic-Republican, former Governor

=== Results ===
1815 New Hampshire gubernatorial election (Note: Some sources give slightly different results. The result given is taken from the New Hampshire Senate Journal.)
Party	Candidate	Votes	%	±%
Federalist	John Taylor Gilman (incumbent)	18,357	50.72%	
Democratic-Republican	William Plumer	17,799	49.18%	
Scattering		38	0.10%	
Majority		558	1.54%	
Turnout		36,194		
Federalist hold		Swing		
