= 1804 New Hampshire gubernatorial election =

- March 13, 1804
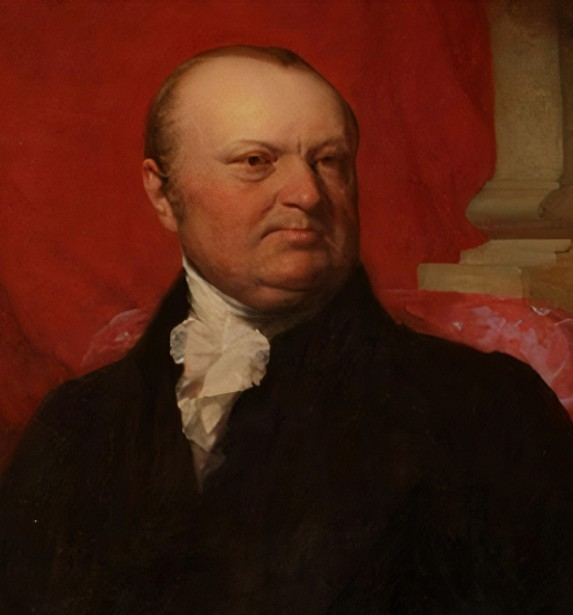

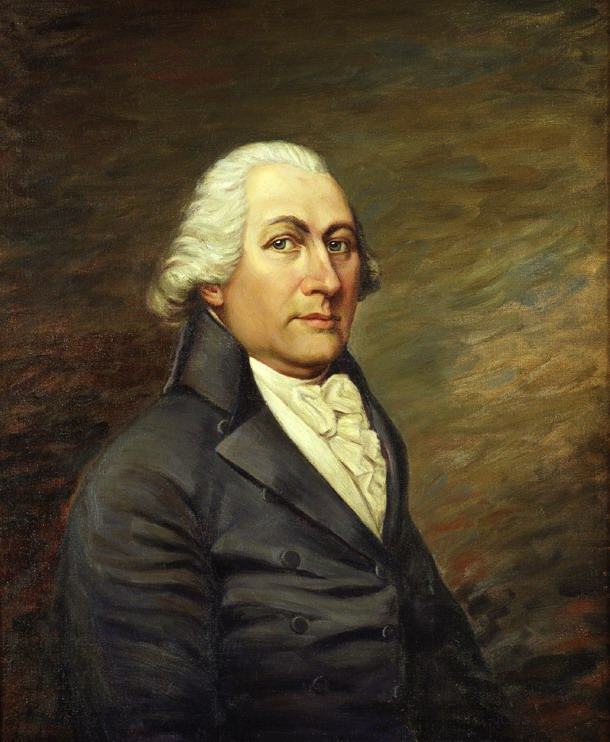
Nominee	John Taylor Gilman	John Langdon
Party	Federalist	Democratic-Republican
Popular vote	12,216	12,039
Percentage	50.31%	49.58%
Governor before election
John Taylor Gilman
Federalist
Elected Governor
John Taylor Gilman
Federalist

The 1804 New Hampshire gubernatorial election took place on March 13, 1804. Incumbent Federalist Governor John Taylor Gilman won re-election to an eleventh term, defeating Democratic-Republican candidate, former Governor and U.S. Senator John Langdon in a re-match of the previous year's election.

== Results ==
1804 New Hampshire gubernatorial election (Note: Most 20th Century sources give the result as Gilman 12,246, Langdon 12,009. The result given here is that given in the New Hampshire Senate Journal.)
Party	Candidate	Votes	%	±%
Federalist	John Taylor Gilman (incumbent)	12,216	50.31%	
Democratic-Republican	John Langdon	12,039	49.58%	
Scattering		27	0.11%	
Majority		177	0.73%	
Turnout		24,282	100.00%	
Federalist hold		Swing		
