= 1802 New Hampshire gubernatorial election =

- March 9, 1802
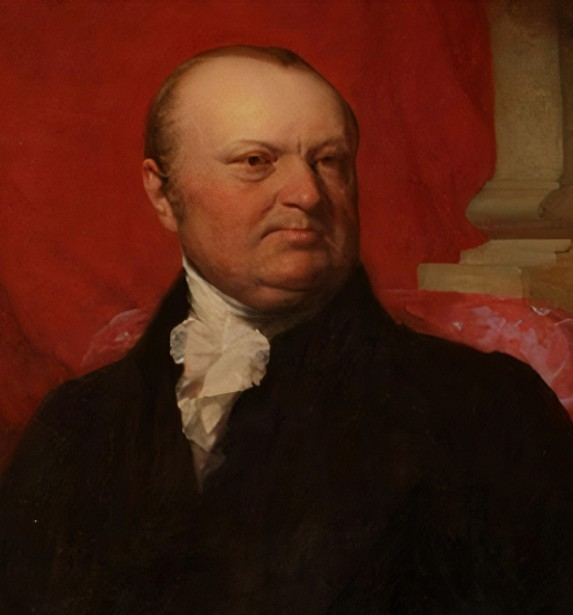

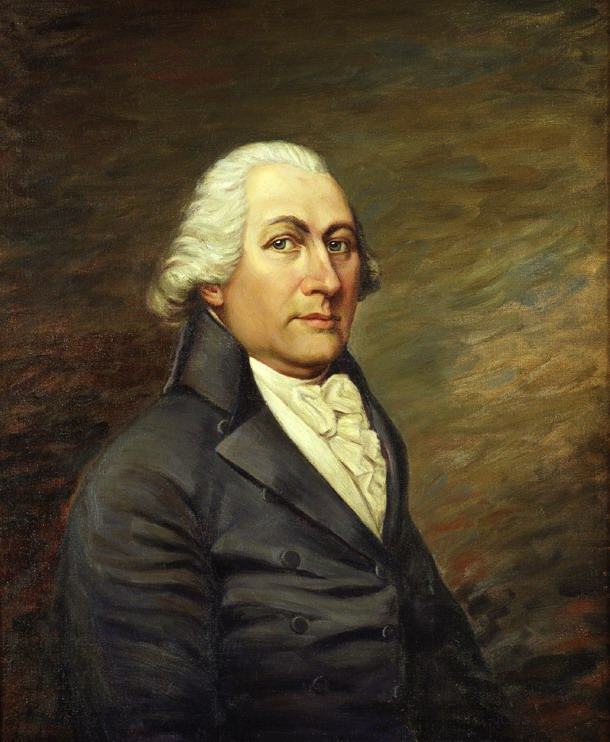
Nominee	John Taylor Gilman	John Langdon
Party	Federalist	Democratic-Republican
Popular vote	10,377	8,753
Percentage	54.14%	45.67%
- County results Gilman: 50–60% 60–70% 70–80% Langdon: 50–60%
Governor before election
John Taylor Gilman
Federalist
Elected Governor
John Taylor Gilman
Federalist

The 1802 New Hampshire gubernatorial election took place on March 9, 1802. to elect the Governor of New Hampshire. Federalist candidate and incumbent Governor of New Hampshire John Taylor Gilman won re-election to a ninth term, defeating Democratic-Republic candidate and former Governor and United States Senator John Langdon.

== Results ==
1802 New Hampshire gubernatorial election
Party	Candidate	Votes	%	±%
Federalist	John Taylor Gilman (incumbent)	10,377	54.14%	
Democratic-Republican	John Langdon	8,753	45.67%	
Scattering		36	0.19%	
Majority		1,624	8.47%	
Turnout		19,166	100.00%	
Federalist hold		Swing		
