= 1805 New Hampshire gubernatorial election =

- March 12, 1805
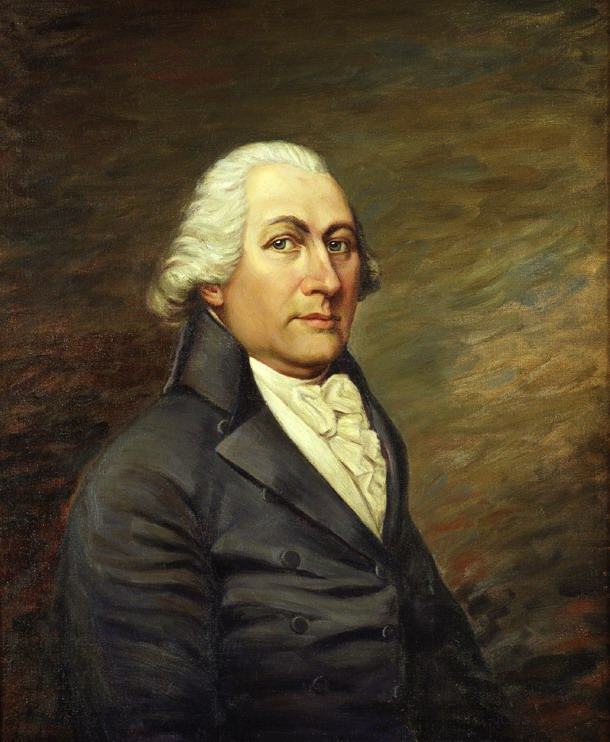

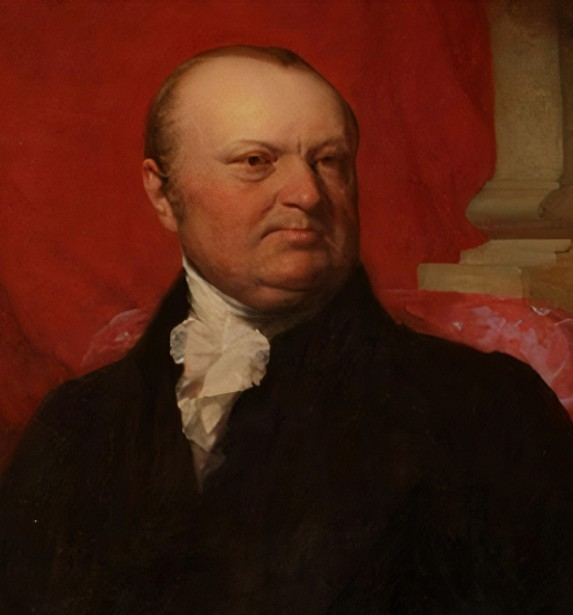
Nominee	John Langdon	John Taylor Gilman
Party	Democratic-Republican	Federalist
Popular vote	16,097	12,287
Percentage	56.59%	43.20%
Governor before election
John Taylor Gilman
Federalist
Elected Governor
John Langdon
Democratic-Republican

The 1805 New Hampshire gubernatorial election took place on March 12, 1805. Incumbent Federalist Governor John Taylor Gilman was defeated for re-election by Democratic-Republican candidate, former Governor and U.S. Senator John Langdon in a re-match of the previous year's election.

== Results ==
1805 New Hampshire gubernatorial election
Party	Candidate	Votes	%	±%
Democratic-Republican	John Langdon	16,097	56.59%	
Federalist	John Taylor Gilman (incumbent)	12,287	43.20%	
Scattering		59	0.21%	
Majority		3,810	13.39%	
Turnout		28,443	100.00%	
Democratic-Republican gain from Federalist		Swing		
