= 1800 New Hampshire gubernatorial election =

- March 11, 1800
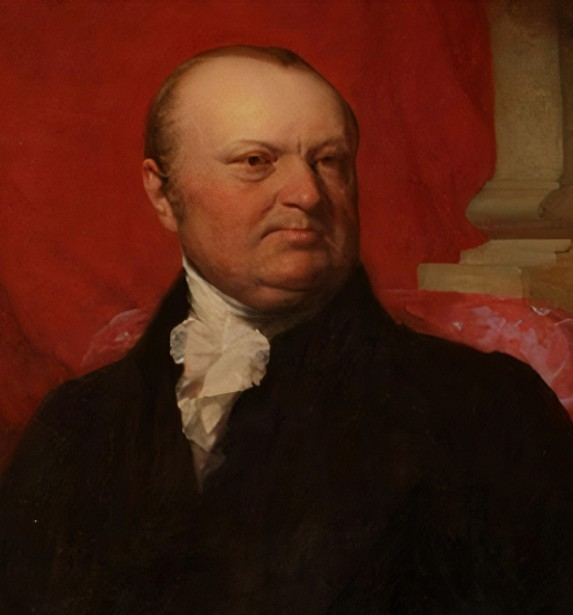

Nominee	John Taylor Gilman	Timothy Walker
Party	Federalist	Democratic-Republican
Popular vote	10,362	6,039
Percentage	61.82%	36.03%
Governor before election
John Taylor Gilman
Federalist
Elected Governor
John Taylor Gilman
Federalist

The 1800 New Hampshire gubernatorial election took place on March 11, 1800. Incumbent Federalist Governor John Taylor Gilman won re-election to a seventh term, defeating Democratic-Republican candidate Timothy Walker.

== Results ==
1800 New Hampshire gubernatorial election
Party	Candidate	Votes	%	±%
Federalist	John Taylor Gilman (incumbent)	10,362	61.82%	
Democratic-Republican	Timothy Walker	6,039	36.03%	
Scattering		361	2.15%	
Majority		4,323	25.79%	
Turnout		16,762	100.00%	
Federalist hold		Swing		
