= 1809 New Hampshire gubernatorial election =

- March 14, 1809
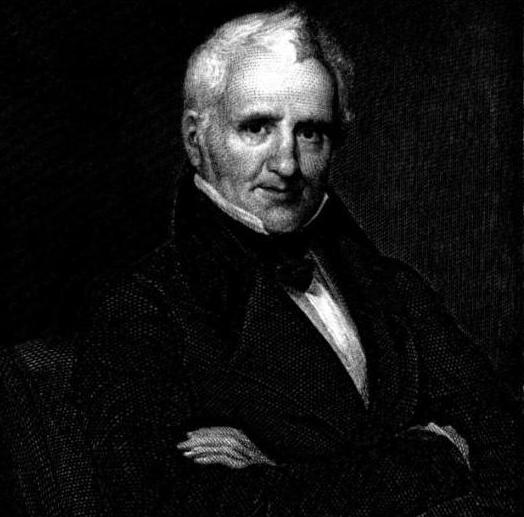

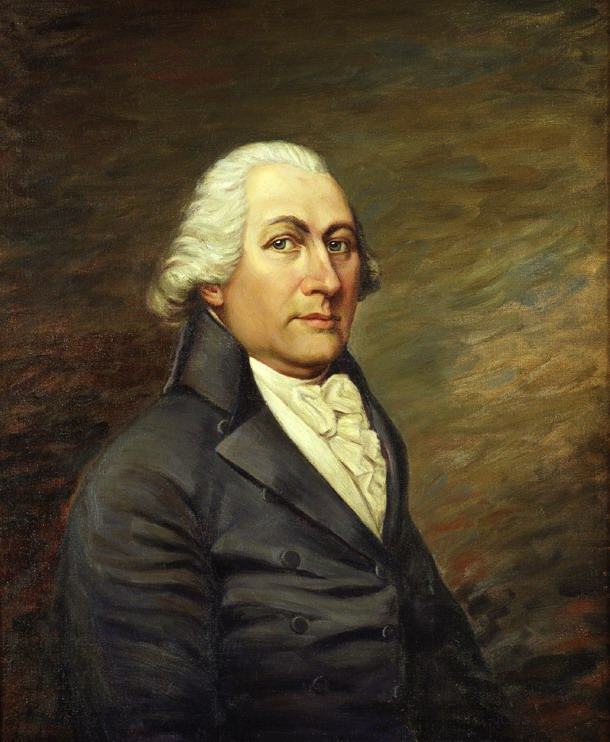
Nominee	Jeremiah Smith	John Langdon
Party	Federalist	Democratic-Republican
Popular vote	15,610	15,241
Percentage	50.38%	49.19%
- County results Smith: 60–70% Langdon: 50–60%
Governor before election
John Langdon
Democratic-Republican
Elected Governor
Jeremiah Smith
Federalist

The 1809 New Hampshire gubernatorial election took place on March 14, 1809. Incumbent Democratic-Republican Governor John Langdon was defeated for re-election by Federalist candidate, Chief Justice of the New Hampshire Superior Court of Judicature Jeremiah Smith.

== General election ==
=== Candidates ===
- John Langdon, Democratic-Republican, incumbent Governor
- Jeremiah Smith, Federalist, Chief Justice of the New Hampshire Superior Court of Judicature

== Results ==
1809 New Hampshire gubernatorial election
Party	Candidate	Votes	%	±%
Federalist	Jeremiah Smith	15,610 (Note: OurCampigns and Dubin record the result as Smith 15,823, Langdon 15,504. This appears to be the result of double-counting the vote in Coös County.)	50.38%	
Democratic-Republican	John Langdon (incumbent)	15,241	49.19%	
Scattering		132	0.43%	
Majority		369	1.19%	
Turnout		30,983	100.00%	
Federalist gain from Democratic-Republican		Swing		
