= 1810 New Hampshire gubernatorial election =

- March 13, 1810
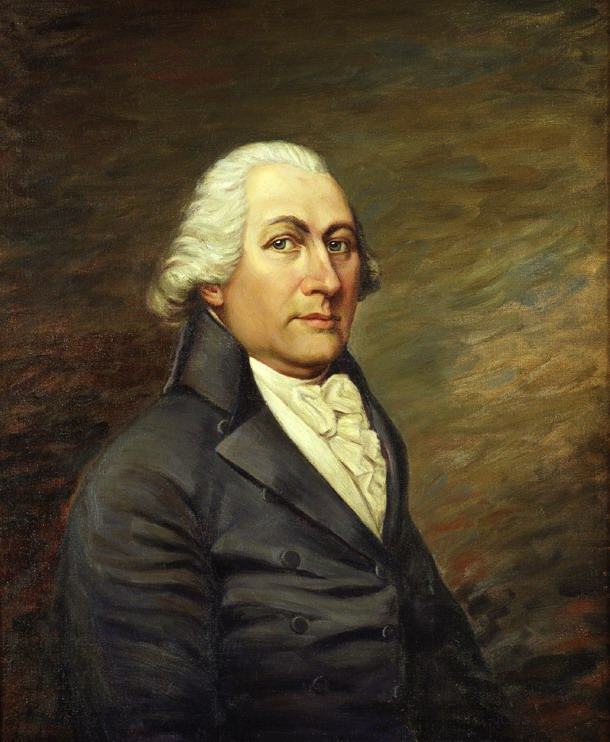

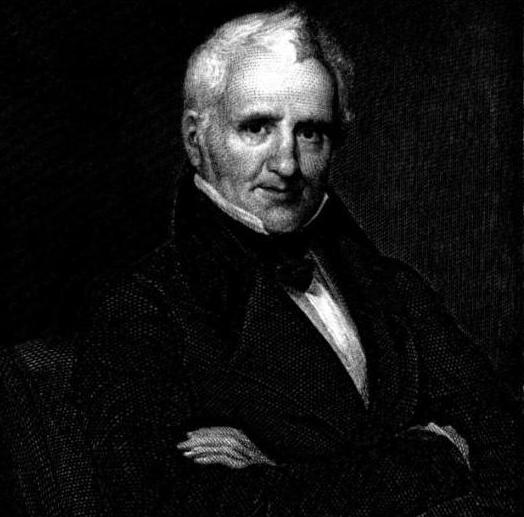
Nominee	John Langdon	Jeremiah Smith
Party	Democratic-Republican	Federalist
Popular vote	16,325	15,166
Percentage	51.70%	48.03%
- County results Langdon: 50–60% 60–70% Smith: 50–60% 60–70%
Governor before election
Jeremiah Smith
Federalist
Elected Governor
John Langdon
Democratic-Republican

The 1810 New Hampshire gubernatorial election was held on March 13, 1810.

Incumbent Federalist Governor Jeremiah Smith was defeated by Democratic-Republican nominee John Langdon in a re-match of the previous year's election.

== General election ==
=== Candidates ===
- John Langdon, Democratic-Republican, former Governor
- Jeremiah Smith, Federalist, incumbent Governor

=== Results ===
1810 New Hampshire gubernatorial election (Note: Some sources give slightly different results. The result given is taken from the New Hampshire Senate Journal.)
Party	Candidate	Votes	%	±%
Democratic-Republican	John Langdon	16,325	51.70%	
Federalist	Jeremiah Smith (incumbent)	15,166	48.03%	
Scattering		84	0.27%	
Majority		1,159	3.67%	
Turnout		31,575		
Democratic-Republican gain from Federalist		Swing		
