= 1803 New Hampshire gubernatorial election =

- March 8, 1803
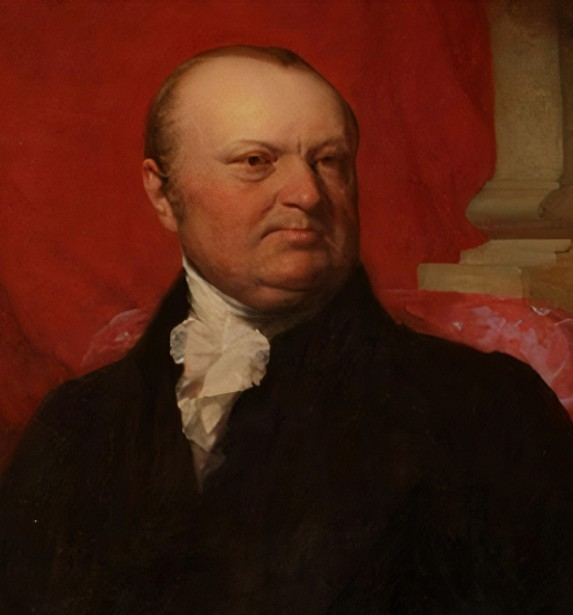

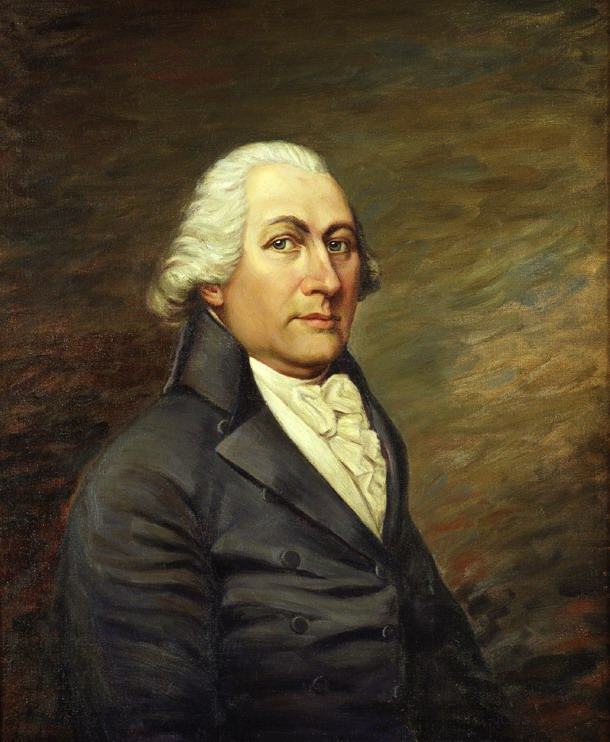
Nominee	John Taylor Gilman	John Langdon
Party	Federalist	Democratic-Republican
Popular vote	12,263	9,011
Percentage	57.53%	42.27%
Governor before election
John Taylor Gilman
Federalist
Elected Governor
John Taylor Gilman
Federalist

The 1803 New Hampshire gubernatorial election took place on March 8, 1803. Incumbent Federalist Governor John Taylor Gilman won re-election to a tenth term, defeating Democratic-Republican candidate, former Governor and United States Senator John Langdon in a re-match of the previous year's election.

== Results ==
1803 New Hampshire gubernatorial election
Party	Candidate	Votes	%	±%
Federalist	John Taylor Gilman (incumbent)	12,263	57.53%	
Democratic-Republican	John Langdon	9,011	42.27%	
Scattering		43	0.20%	
Majority		3,252	15.26%	
Turnout		21,317	100.00%	
Federalist hold		Swing		
