= 1814 New Hampshire gubernatorial election =

- March 8, 1814
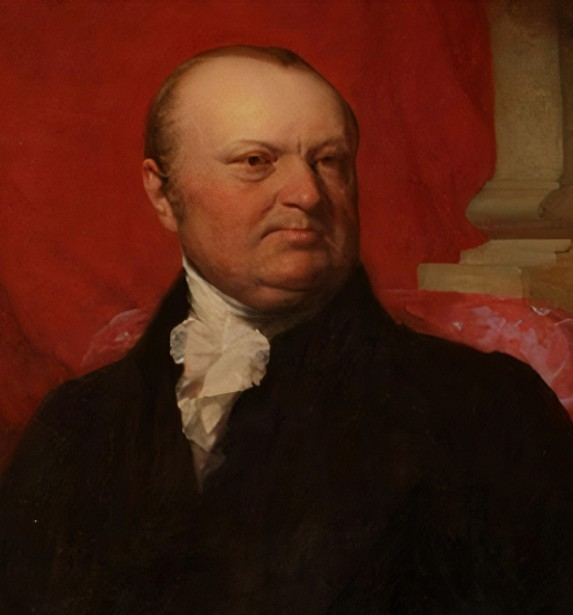

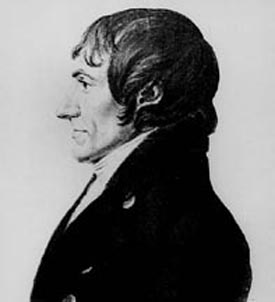
Nominee	John Taylor Gilman	William Plumer
Party	Federalist	Democratic-Republican
Popular vote	19,675	18,794
Percentage	51.05%	48.76%
- County results Gilman: 50–60% 60–70% Plumer: 50–60%
Governor before election
John Taylor Gilman
Federalist
Elected Governor
John Taylor Gilman
Federalist

The 1814 New Hampshire gubernatorial election was held on March 8, 1814.

Incumbent Federalist Governor John Taylor Gilman defeated Democratic-Republican nominee William Plumer in a re-match of the previous year's election.

== General election ==
=== Candidates ===
- John Taylor Gilman, Federalist, incumbent Governor
- William Plumer, Democratic-Republican, former Governor

=== Results ===
1814 New Hampshire gubernatorial election (Note: Some sources give Gilman's total as 19,695. The result given is taken from the New Hampshire Senate Journal.)
Party	Candidate	Votes	%	±%
Federalist	John Taylor Gilman (incumbent)	19,675	51.05%	
Democratic-Republican	William Plumer	18,794	48.76%	
Scattering		73	0.19%	
Majority		881	2.29%	
Turnout		38,542		
Federalist hold		Swing		
