= 1799 New Hampshire gubernatorial election =

- March 12, 1799
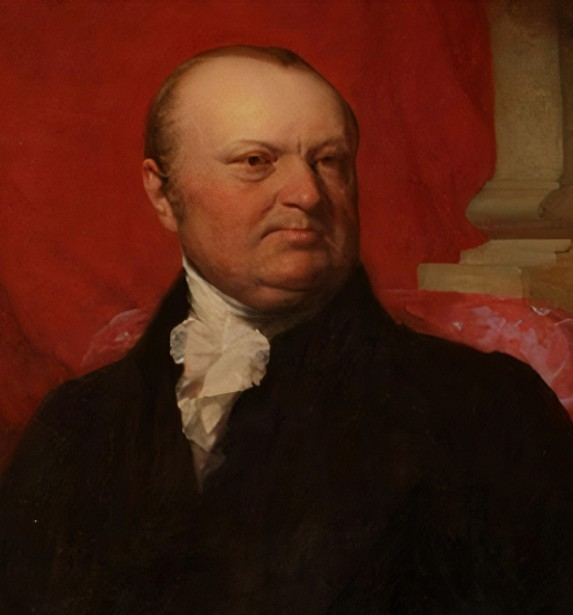
Nominee	John Taylor Gilman
Party	Federalist
Popular vote	10,138
Percentage	86.37%
Governor before election
John Taylor Gilman
Federalist
Elected Governor
John Taylor Gilman
Federalist

The 1799 New Hampshire gubernatorial election took place on March 12, 1799. Incumbent Federalist Governor John Taylor Gilman won re-election to a sixth term.

== Results ==
1799 New Hampshire gubernatorial election
Party	Candidate	Votes	%	±%
Federalist	John Taylor Gilman (incumbent)	10,138	86.37%	
Scattering		1,600	13.63%	
Turnout		11,738	100.00%	
Federalist hold		Swing		
