= 1811 New Hampshire gubernatorial election =

- March 12, 1811
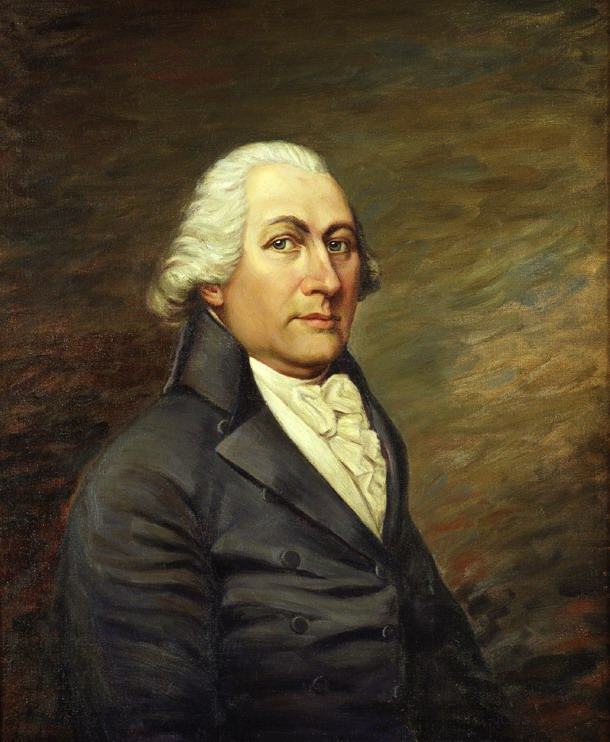

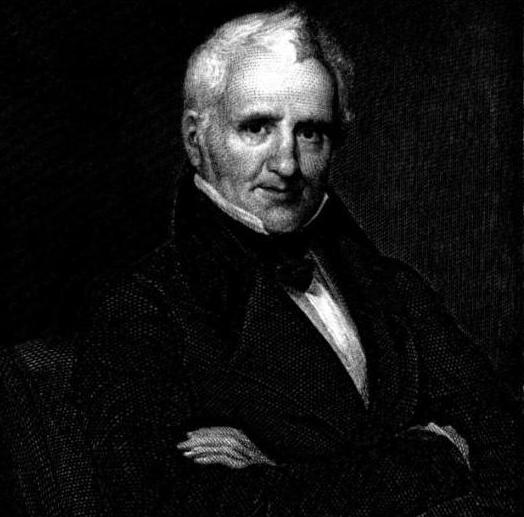
Nominee	John Langdon	Jeremiah Smith
Party	Democratic-Republican	Federalist
Popular vote	17,552	14,477
Percentage	54.69%	45.11%
- County results Langdon: 50–60% 60–70% Smith: 50–60%
Governor before election
John Langdon
Democratic-Republican
Elected Governor
John Langdon
Democratic-Republican

The 1811 New Hampshire gubernatorial election was held on March 12, 1811.

Incumbent Democratic-Republican Governor John Langdon defeated Federalist nominee Jeremiah Smith in a re-match of the previous year's election.

== General election ==
=== Candidates ===
- John Langdon, Democratic-Republican, former Governor
- Jeremiah Smith, Federalist, incumbent Governor

=== Results ===
1811 New Hampshire gubernatorial election (Note: Some sources give Langdon's total as 17,554, while others give it as 17,522. The result given is taken from the New Hampshire Senate Journal.)
Party	Candidate	Votes	%	±%
Democratic-Republican	John Langdon (incumbent)	17,552	54.69%	
Federalist	Jeremiah Smith	14,477	45.11%	
Scattering		65	0.20%	
Majority		3,075	9.58%	
Turnout		32,094		
Democratic-Republican hold		Swing		
