= 1797 New Hampshire gubernatorial election =

- March 14, 1797
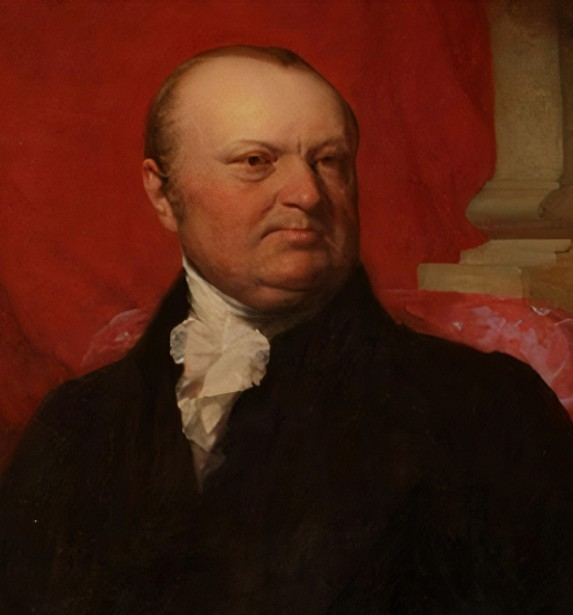
Nominee	John Taylor Gilman
Party	Federalist
Popular vote	9,625
Percentage	88.93%
Governor before election
John Taylor Gilman
Federalist
Elected Governor
John Taylor Gilman
Federalist

The 1797 New Hampshire gubernatorial election took place on March 14, 1797. Incumbent Federalist Governor John Taylor Gilman won re-election to a fourth term.

== Results ==
1797 New Hampshire gubernatorial election
Party	Candidate	Votes	%	±%
Federalist	John Taylor Gilman (incumbent)	9,625	88.93%	
Scattering		1,198	11.07%	
Turnout		10,823	100.00%	
Federalist hold		Swing		
