= 1806 New Hampshire gubernatorial election =

- March 11, 1806
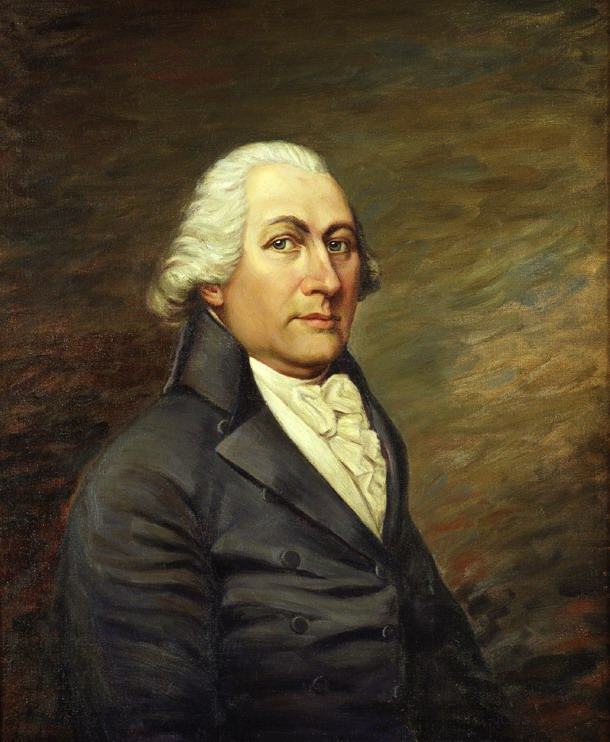

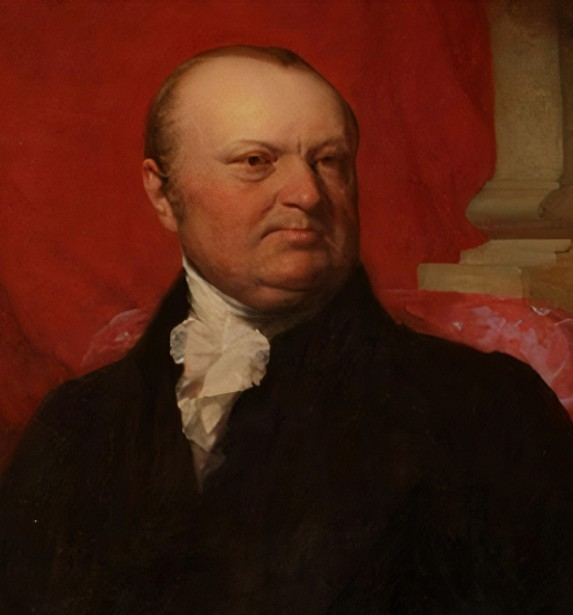
Nominee	John Langdon	Timothy Farrar	John Taylor Gilman
Party	Democratic-Republican	Federalist	Federalist
Popular vote	15,277	1,720	1,553
Percentage	74.26%	8.36%	7.55%
- County results Langdon: 60–70% 70–80% 80–90%
Governor before election
John Langdon
Democratic-Republican
Elected Governor
John Langdon
Democratic-Republican

The 1806 New Hampshire gubernatorial election was held on March 11, 1806.

Incumbent Democratic-Republican Governor John Langdon won re-election to a second term.

== General election ==
=== Major candidates ===
- John Langdon, Democratic-Republican, incumbent Governor

=== Minor candidates ===
The following candidates may not have been formally nominated and attracted only scattering votes.

- Timothy Farrar, Chief Justice of the Court of Common Pleas for Hillsborough County, former justice of the New Hampshire Superior Court of Judicature
- John Taylor Gilman, Federalist, former Governor
- Oliver Peabody, Federalist, former President of the New Hampshire Senate
- Jeremiah Smith, Federalist, Chief Justice of the New Hampshire Superior Court of Judicature

=== Results ===
1806 New Hampshire gubernatorial election (Note: Some sources give slightly different results. The result given is taken from the New Hampshire Senate Journal.)
Party	Candidate	Votes	%	±%
Democratic-Republican	John Langdon (incumbent)	15,277	74.26%	
Federalist	Timothy Farrar	1,720	8.36%	
Federalist	John Taylor Gilman	1,553	7.55%	
Federalist	Jeremiah Smith	902	4.38%	
Federalist	Oliver Peabody	866	4.21%	
Scattering		255	1.24%	
Majority		13,557	65.90%	
Turnout		20,573		
Democratic-Republican hold		Swing		
