= 1806 Massachusetts gubernatorial election =

- April 7, 1806
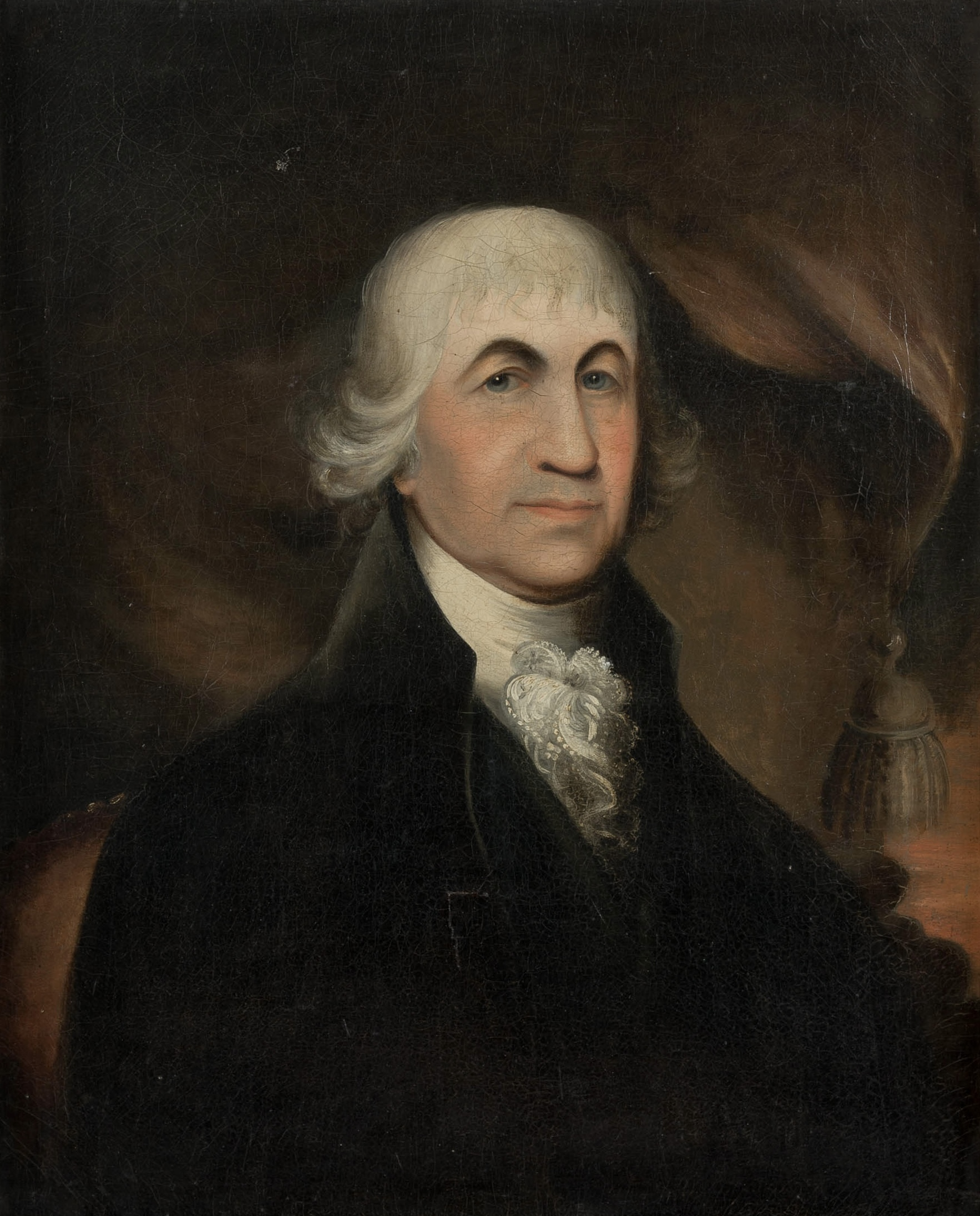

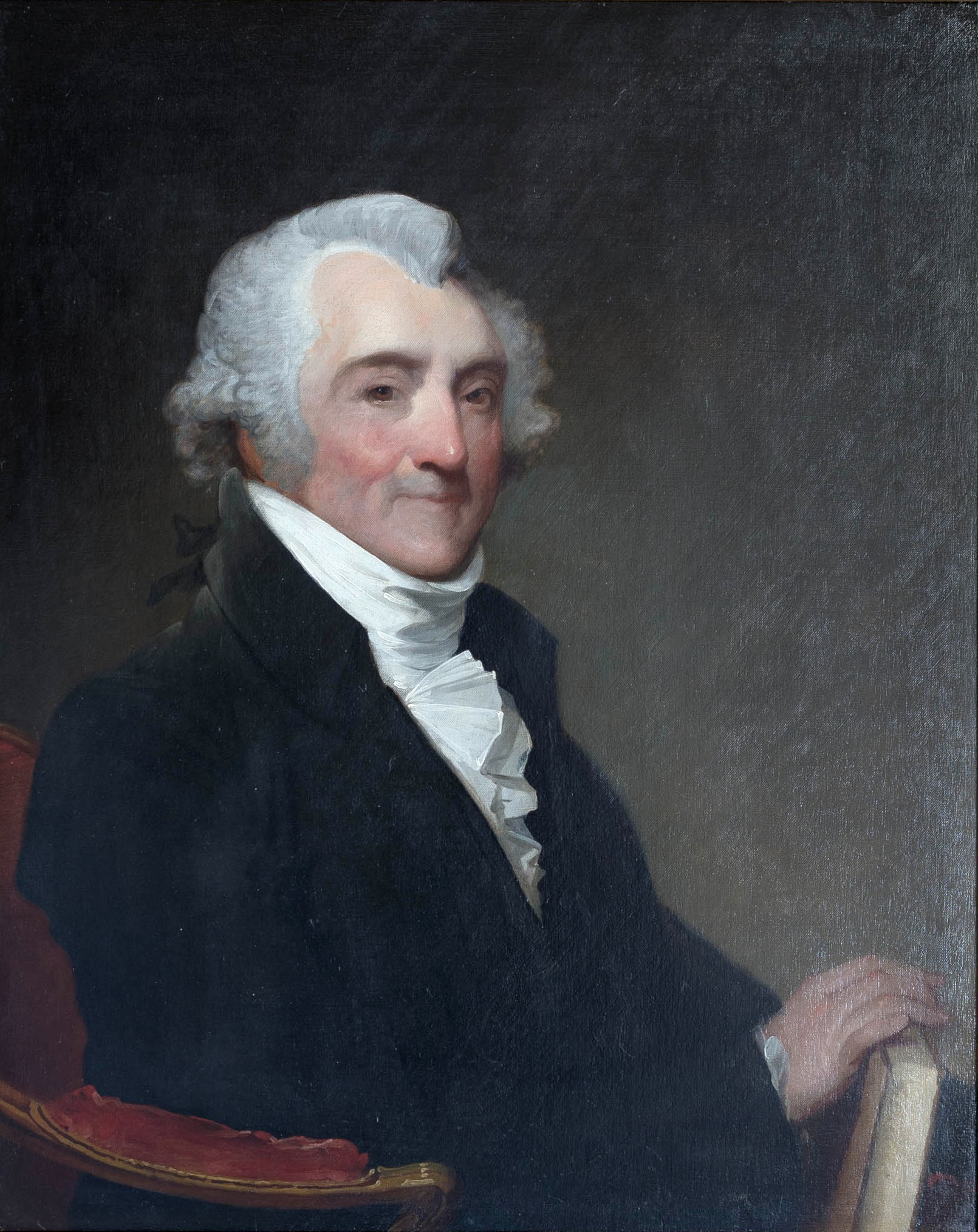
Nominee	Caleb Strong	James Sullivan
Party	Federalist	Democratic-Republican
Popular vote	37,739	37,109
Percentage	50.20%	49.36%
- County results Strong: 50–60% 60–70% 70–80% Sullivan: 50–60% 60–70% 70–80%
Governor before election
Caleb Strong
Federalist
Elected Governor
Caleb Strong
Federalist

The 1806 Massachusetts gubernatorial election was held on April 7, 1806, in order to elect the Governor of Massachusetts. Incumbent Federalist Governor of Massachusetts Caleb Strong won re-election in a second rematch against the incumbent Democratic-Republican Attorney General of Massachusetts James Sullivan.

== General election ==
On election day, April 7, 1806, Federalist nominee Caleb Strong won re-election by a margin of 630 votes against his opponent Democratic-Republican nominee James Sullivan, thereby holding Federalist control over the office of Governor. Strong was sworn in for a 7th term on May 29, 1806.

=== Results ===
Massachusetts gubernatorial election, 1806
Party	Candidate	Votes	%
Federalist	Caleb Strong (incumbent)	37,739	50.20
Democratic-Republican	James Sullivan	37,109	49.36
	Scattering	330	0.44
Total votes		75,178	100.00
Federalist hold			
