= 1806 South Carolina gubernatorial election =

- December 9, 1806
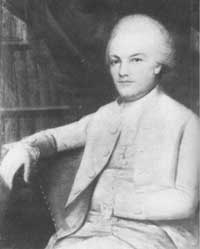

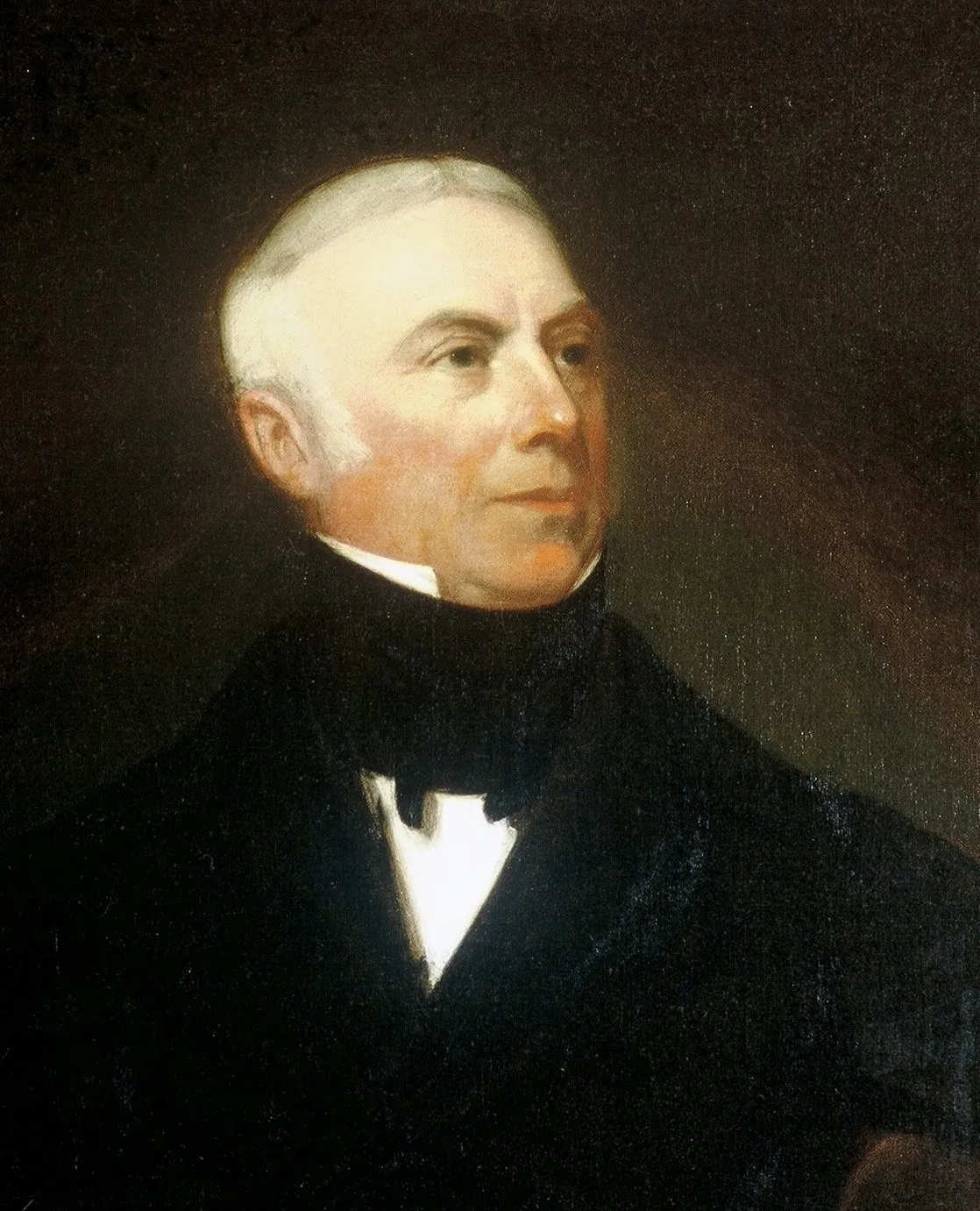
| Nominee | Charles Pinckney | Henry Middleton |
| Party | Democratic-Republican | Democratic-Republican |
| Popular vote | 73 | 66 |
| Percentage | 52.52% | 47.48% |
Governor before election
Paul Hamilton
Democratic-Republican
Elected Governor
Charles Pinckney
Democratic-Republican

The 1806 South Carolina gubernatorial election was held on December 9, 1806, in order to elect the governor of South Carolina. Former Democratic-Republican governor Charles Pinckney was elected by the South Carolina General Assembly against fellow Democratic-Republican candidate and former member of the South Carolina House of Representatives Henry Middleton.

== General election ==
On election day, December 9, 1806, former Democratic-Republican governor Charles Pinckney was elected by the South Carolina General Assembly by a margin of 7 votes against his opponent fellow Democratic-Republican candidate Henry Middleton, thereby retaining Democratic-Republican control over the office of governor. Pinckney was sworn in for his fourth overall term on January 3, 1807.

=== Results ===
South Carolina gubernatorial election, 1806
| Party | Candidate | Votes | % |
|---|---|---|---|
| Democratic-Republican | Charles Pinckney | 73 | 52.52% |
| Democratic-Republican | Henry Middleton | 66 | 47.48% |
| Total votes | | 139 | 100.00% |
| Democratic-Republican hold | | | |
