= 1806 Maryland gubernatorial election =

- November 10, 1806
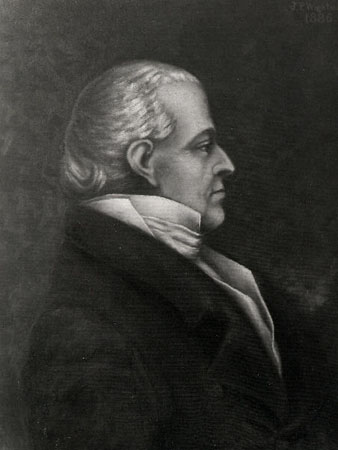

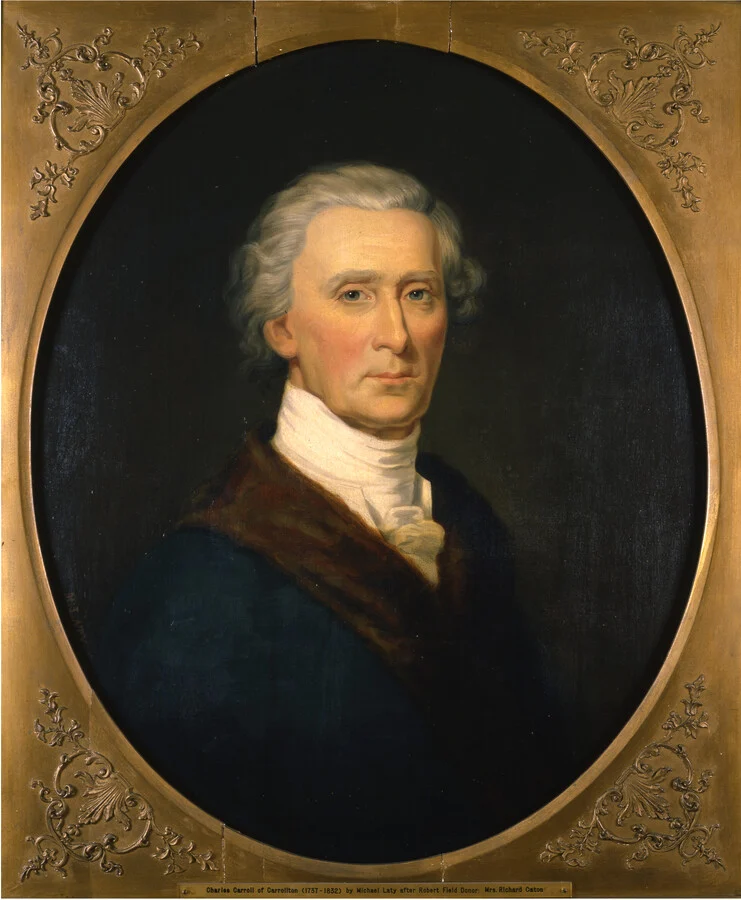
Nominee	Robert Wright	Charles Carroll
Party	Democratic-Republican	Federalist
Popular vote	59	11
Percentage	79.73%	14.87%
Governor before election
Robert Bowie
Democratic-Republican
Elected Governor
Robert Wright
Democratic-Republican

The 1806 Maryland gubernatorial election was held on November 10, 1806, in order to elect the Governor of Maryland. Incumbent Democratic-Republican United States Senator Robert Wright was elected by the Maryland General Assembly against Federalist candidates former United States Senator Charles Carroll, former Governor John Eager Howard and fellow former Governor Thomas Johnson.

== General election ==
On election day, November 10, 1806, incumbent Democratic-Republican Senator Robert Wright was elected by the Maryland General Assembly, thereby retaining Democratic-Republican control over the office of governor. Wright was sworn in as the 12th Governor of Maryland on November 12, 1806.

=== Results ===
Maryland gubernatorial election, 1806
Party	Candidate	Votes	%
Democratic-Republican	Robert Wright	59	79.73
Federalist	Charles Carroll	11	14.87
Federalist	John Eager Howard	3	4.05
Federalist	Thomas Johnson	1	1.35
Total votes		74	100.00
Democratic-Republican hold			
