= 1806 Virginia gubernatorial election =

- December 4, 1806
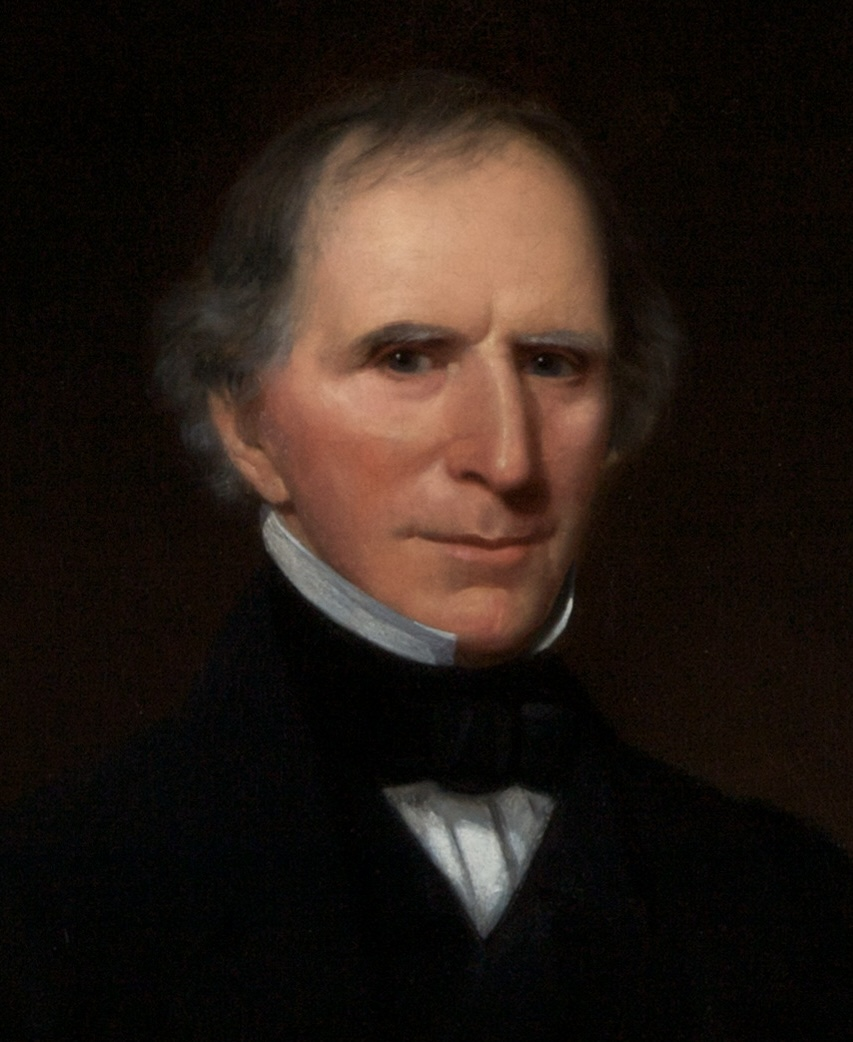
Nominee	William H. Cabell
Governor before election
William H. Cabell
Democratic-Republican
Elected Governor
William H. Cabell
Democratic-Republican (Note: Lampi lists no parties for this election. Both Kallenbach and Kallenbach and Sobel and Raimo list Cabell as a Democratic-Republican during his tenure.)

A gubernatorial election was held in Virginia on December 4, 1806. The incumbent governor of Virginia William H. Cabell was re-elected without opposition.

The election was conducted by the Virginia General Assembly in joint session. Cabell was elected with a majority on the first ballot.

== General election ==
1806 Virginia gubernatorial election
Candidate	First ballot	
Candidate	Count	Percent
William H. Cabell (incumbent)	**	
Total	**	100.00

== Bibliography ==
- Kallenbach, Joseph E.; Kallenbach, Jessamine S. (1977). American State Governors, 1776–1976. Vol. 1. Dobbs Ferry, NY: Oceana Publications.
- Lampi, Philip J. (2012). "Virginia 1806 Governor". A New Nation Votes. American Antiquarian Society.
- Sobel, Robert; Raimo, John (1978). Biographical Directory of the Governors of the United States 1789–1978. Vol. 4. Westport, CT: Meckler Books.
