= 1806 North Carolina gubernatorial election =

- November 27, 1806
Nominee	Nathaniel Alexander
Party	Democratic-Republican
Popular vote	100
Percentage	100.00%
Governor before election
Nathaniel Alexander
Democratic-Republican
Elected Governor
Nathaniel Alexander
Democratic-Republican

The 1806 North Carolina gubernatorial election was held on November 27, 1806, in order to elect the governor of North Carolina. Incumbent Democratic-Republican governor Nathaniel Alexander was re-elected by the North Carolina General Assembly as he ran unopposed.

== General election ==
On election day, November 27, 1806, incumbent Democratic-Republican governor Nathaniel Alexander was re-elected by the North Carolina General Assembly, thereby retaining Democratic-Republican control over the office of governor. Alexander was sworn in for his second term on December 1, 1806.

=== Results ===
North Carolina gubernatorial election, 1806
Party	Candidate	Votes	%
Democratic-Republican	Nathaniel Alexander (incumbent)	100	100.00
Total votes		100	100.00
Democratic-Republican hold			
