= 1806 Rhode Island gubernatorial election =

- April 2, 1806
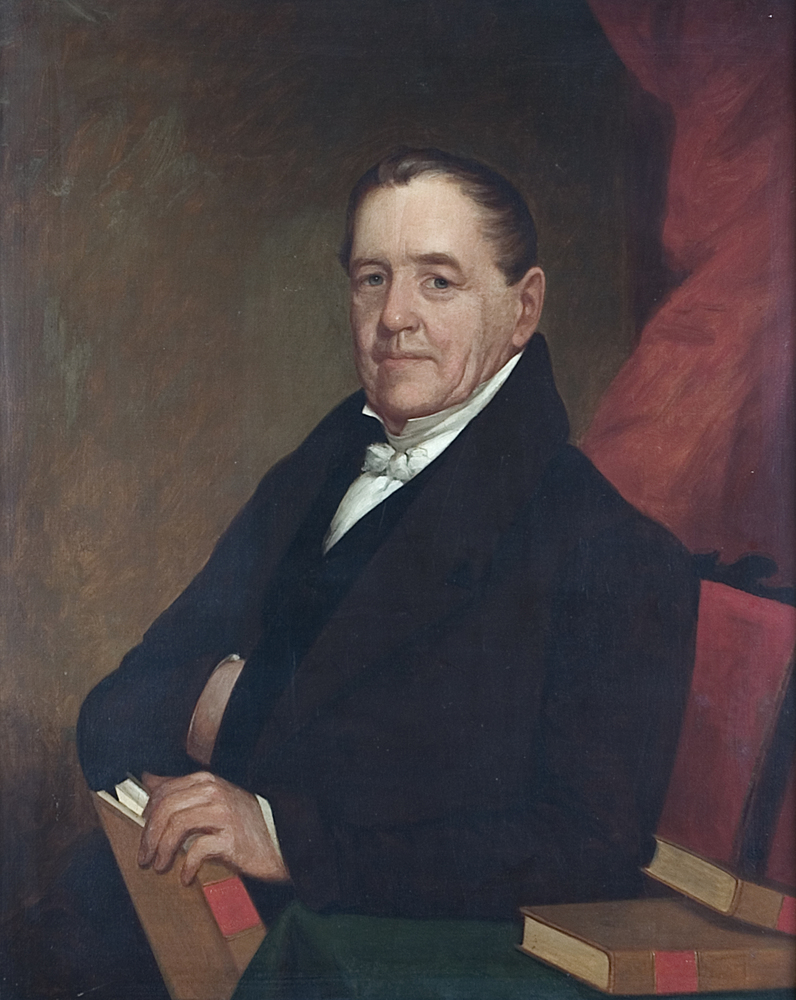

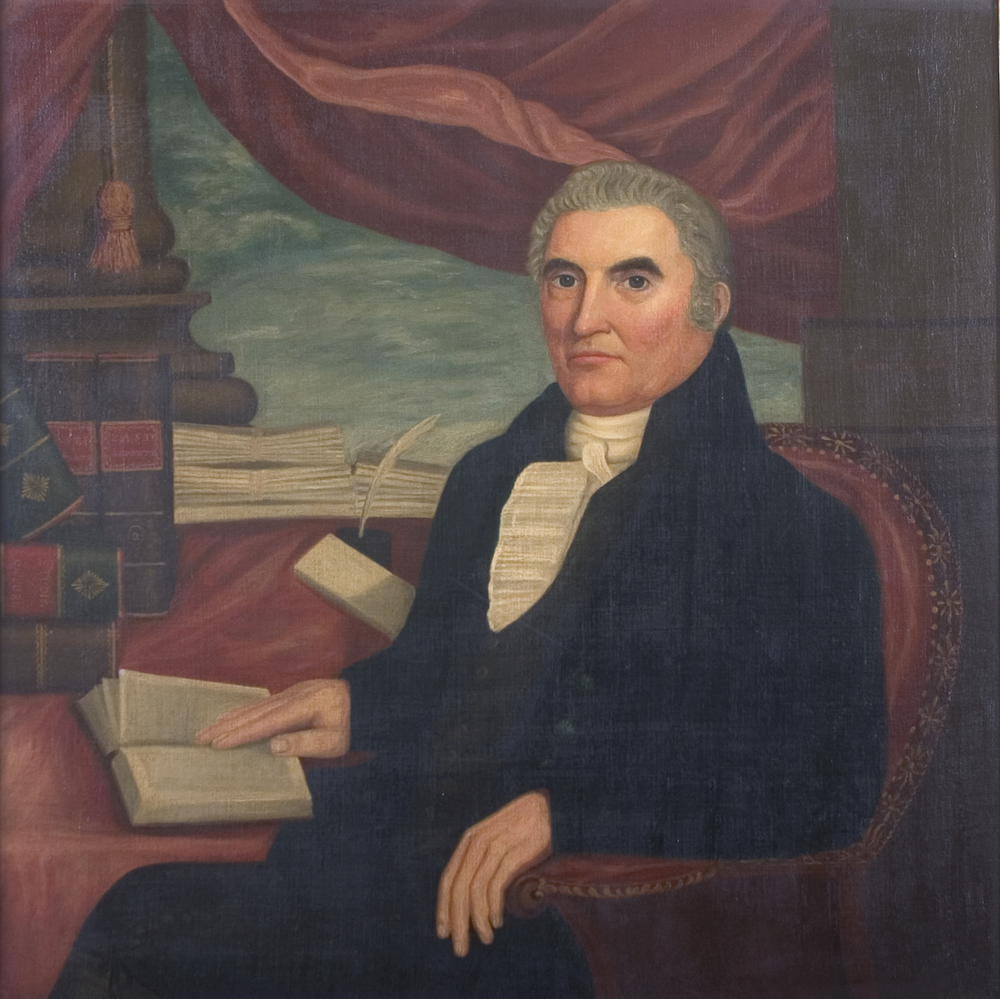
Nominee	Richard Jackson Jr.	Henry Smith	Peleg Arnold
Party	Federalist	Democratic-Republican	Democratic-Republican
Popular vote	1,662	1,097	1,094
Percentage	43.07%	28.43%	28.35%
- County results Jackson: 40–50% Smith: 30–40% 50–60%
Governor before election
Henry Smith
Democratic-Republican
Elected Governor
Isaac Wilbour
Democratic-Republican

The 1806 Rhode Island gubernatorial election was held on April 2, 1806, in order to elect the governor of Rhode Island. Federalist nominee Richard Jackson Jr. won a plurality of the vote against incumbent Democratic-Republican governor Henry Smith and Democratic-Republican candidate and incumbent chief justice of the Rhode Island Supreme Court Peleg Arnold. However, as no candidate received a majority of the total votes cast as was required by Rhode Island law, the election was forwarded to the Rhode Island legislature. When the legislature was also unable to elect a governor, it was decided that Democratic-Republican lieutenant governor-elect Isaac Wilbour would serve out the term as acting governor.

== General election ==
On election day, April 2, 1806, Federalist nominee Richard Jackson Jr. led the field by a margin of 565 votes against his foremost opponent incumbent Democratic-Republican governor Henry Smith. As he however did not receive a majority of all votes cast, the race was ultimately awarded to Democratic-Republican lieutenant governor-elect Isaac Wilbour, who would serve out the term as acting governor, thereby retaining Democratic-Republican control over the office of governor. Wilbour was sworn in as the acting 6th governor of Rhode Island on May 7, 1806.

=== Results ===
Rhode Island gubernatorial election, 1806
Party	Candidate	Votes	%
Federalist	Richard Jackson Jr.	1,662	43.07
Democratic-Republican	Henry Smith (incumbent)	1,097	28.43
Democratic-Republican	Peleg Arnold	1,094	28.35
	Scattering	6	0.15
Total votes		3,859	100.00
Democratic-Republican hold			
