= John Taylor Gilman =

American politician (1753–1828)

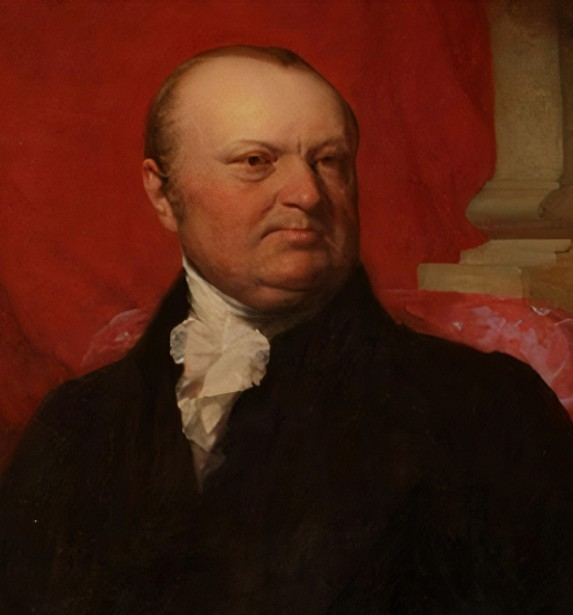

5th Governor of New Hampshire
- In office June 3, 1813 – June 6, 1816
- Preceded by: William Plumer
- Succeeded by: William Plumer
- In office June 5, 1794 – June 6, 1805
- Preceded by: Josiah Bartlett
- Succeeded by: John Langdon

Member of the New Hampshire House of Representatives
- In office 1810-1811

Personal details
- Born: December 19, 1753 Exeter, Province of New Hampshire, British America
- Died: September 1, 1828 (aged 74) Exeter, New Hampshire, U.S.
- Party: Federalist

John Taylor Gilman (December 19, 1753 – September 1, 1828) was a farmer, shipbuilder and statesman from Exeter, New Hampshire. He represented New Hampshire in the Continental Congress in 1782–1783 and was the fifth governor of New Hampshire for nearly 14 years, from 1794 to 1805, and from 1813 to 1816. Taylor Gilman's tenure as governor of 13 years, 11 months, and 25 days is the longest for any governor from the Federalist Party.

== Early life ==
Gilman was born in Exeter, in the Province of New Hampshire, the son of Ann (Taylor) and Nicholas Gilman. His brother was Nicholas Gilman, who had signed the U.S. Constitution. His family had settled in Exeter in its earliest days. He lived in the Ladd-Gilman House, now a part of the American Independence Museum. He received a limited education before he entered into the family shipbuilding and mercantile businesses. Aged 22, he read aloud a Dunlap Broadside brought to New Hampshire on July 16, 1776 to the city of Exeter. The American Independence Museum commemorates his brave act every year at their American Independence Festival, where a role-player reads the Declaration in its entirety to festival-goers.

== Career ==
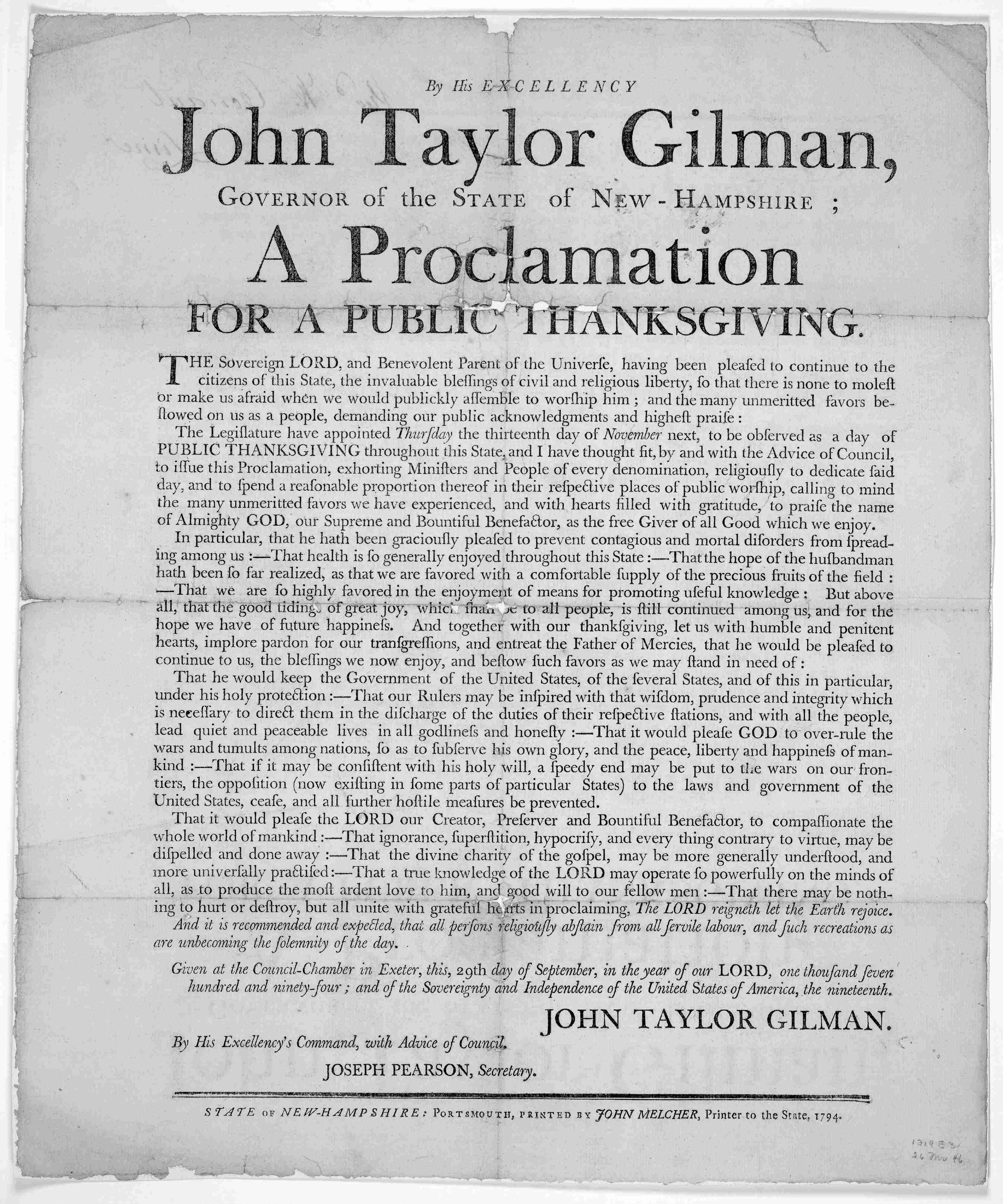
Broadside proclamation from Governor Gilman, Exeter, 1794

Gilman was one of the Minutemen of 1775 and a selectman in 1777 and 1778. Gilman served as a member of the New Hampshire House of Representatives in 1779 and 1781 and was a delegate to the Convention of the States in Hartford, Connecticut, in October 1780. He served as a member of the Continental Congress in 1782 and 1783. He was the New Hampshire Treasurer in 1791 and moderator in 1791–1794, 1806, 1807, 1809–1811, 1817, 1818, and 1820–1825.

Gilman served as Governor of New Hampshire between 1794 and 1805 and was an unsuccessful candidate for re-election in 1805. He was again a member of the New Hampshire House of Representatives in 1810 and 1811 and again an unsuccessful candidate for governor in 1812. He was elected governor and served from 1813 to 1816 and declined to be a candidate for renomination for governor in 1816. He was an ex officio trustee of Dartmouth College, Hanover, New Hampshire (1794–1805 and 1813–1816), and trustee by election (1817–1819). He was president of the board of trustees of Phillips Exeter Academy, Exeter, New Hampshire, 1795–1827, and donor of the oldest property, the 'Yard,' upon which the older buildings stand. Gilman was also elected a member of the American Antiquarian Society in 1814.

== Personal life ==
Gilman was married to Deborah (Folsom) Gilman, the daughter of Major General Nathaniel Folsom of Exeter. He died in Exeter on September 1, 1828. He is the first governor of New Hampshire not to have a place in the state named after him. The town of Gilmanton, settled by 24 members of the extended Gilman clan, was named for the family as a whole and not for the Governor.

== See also ==
- New Hampshire Historical Marker No. 161: Ladd-Gilman House

Party political offices
First	Federalist nominee for Governor of New Hampshire; 1794, 1795, 1796, 1797, 1798, 1799, 1800, 1801, 1802, 1803, 1804, 1805, 1806, 1807, 1808	Succeeded by Jeremiah Smith
Preceded by Jeremiah Smith	Federalist nominee for Governor of New Hampshire; 1812, 1813, 1814, 1815	Succeeded by James Sheafe
Political offices
Preceded by Josiah Bartlett	Governor of New Hampshire; 1794–1805	Succeeded by John Langdon
Preceded by William Plumer	Governor of New Hampshire; 1813–1816	Succeeded by William Plumer
