= John Langdon (politician) =

American politician and Founding Father (1741–1819)

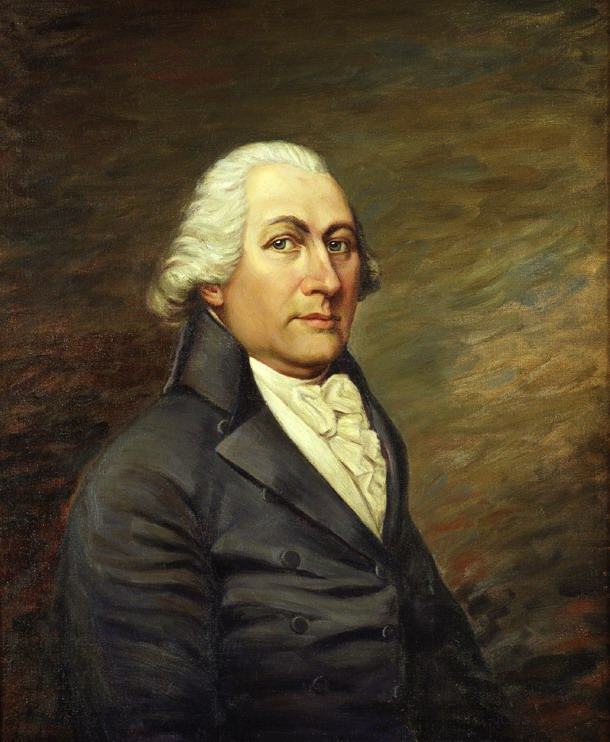
- Posthumous portrait by Hattie Elizabeth Burdette, c. 1916

2nd and 4th Governor of New Hampshire
- In office June 5, 1810 – June 5, 1812
- Preceded by: Jeremiah Smith
- Succeeded by: William Plumer
- In office June 6, 1805 – June 8, 1809
- Preceded by: John Taylor Gilman
- Succeeded by: Jeremiah Smith

2nd President of New Hampshire
- In office June 4, 1788 – January 22, 1789
- Preceded by: John Sullivan
- Succeeded by: John Sullivan
- In office June 1, 1785 – June 7, 1786
- Preceded by: Meshech Weare
- Succeeded by: John Sullivan

President pro tempore of the United States Senate
- In office November 5, 1792 – December 2, 1793
- Preceded by: Richard Henry Lee
- Succeeded by: Ralph Izard
- In office April 6, 1789 – August 9, 1789
- Preceded by: Position established
- Succeeded by: Richard Henry Lee

United States Senator from New Hampshire
- In office March 4, 1789 – March 3, 1801
- Preceded by: Seat established
- Succeeded by: James Sheafe

Personal details
- Born: June 26, 1741 Portsmouth, New Hampshire, British America
- Died: September 18, 1819 (aged 78) Portsmouth, New Hampshire, U.S.
- Party: Pro-Administration; Anti-Administration; Democratic-Republican

John Langdon Jr. (June 26, 1741 – September 18, 1819) was an American politician and Founding Father from New Hampshire. He served as a delegate to the Constitutional Convention, signed the United States Constitution, and was one of the first two United States senators from New Hampshire.

As a member of the Continental Congress, Langdon was an early supporter of the Revolutionary War. He later served in the United States Congress for 12 years, including as the first president pro tempore of the Senate, before becoming president and later governor of New Hampshire. He turned down a nomination for U.S. vice presidential candidate in 1812.

== Ancestry and early life ==
Although information about John Langdon's specific ancestry is not widely available, it is known that he was a sixth generation American and his family had roots in England. His father, John Langdon Sr., was a descendant of English settlers who had come to the American colonies. The Langdon family was part of the early wave of European settlers who arrived in New England in the 17th century, seeking new opportunities and religious freedom.

The Langdon surname is of Anglo-Saxon origin and is believed to have originated from multiple places in England. In the 17th century, the Langdon last name was particularly common in the southwestern counties of England, specifically in Cornwall and Devon. The name is derived from Old English words "lang" (meaning long) and "dūn" (meaning hill). It is a toponymic surname, meaning it was likely given to individuals who lived near a long hill or a similar geographical feature.

One example of a Langdon coat of arms, particularly associated with the Langdons of Cornwall and Devon, is described as follows: "Argent, a chevron between three escallops sable." In heraldic terms, this description indicates a silver or white shield (argent) featuring a black chevron (chevron sable) with three black scallop shells (escallops sable) placed above and below the chevron.

Langdon's father was a prosperous farmer and local shipbuilder whose family had emigrated to America before 1660 from Sheviock, Caradon, Cornwall. The Langdons were among the first of New England's major seaports. Langdon attended the local grammar school (Major Hale's School) run by a veteran of the 1745 Siege of Louisbourg against the French at Fortress of Louisbourg in New France.

After finishing his primary education, he and his older brother, Woodbury Langdon, rejected the opportunity to join in their father's successful agricultural livelihood and apprenticed themselves to local naval merchants. By age 22, Langdon was captain of the cargo ship Andromache, sailing to the West Indies. Four years later he owned his first merchantman and would continue over time to acquire a small fleet of vessels engaging in the triangle trade between Portsmouth, the Caribbean, and London. His older brother was even more successful in international trade, and by 1777 both young men were among Portsmouth's wealthiest citizens.

== American Revolution ==
British control of the shipping industries limited Langdon's business, motivating him to become a vigorous and prominent supporter of the colonial American revolutionary movement in the 1770s. He served on the New Hampshire provincial committee of correspondence and a non-importation committee about British goods and also attended various Patriot assemblies. In 1774, he participated in the seizure and confiscation of British munitions from Fort William and Mary at Portsmouth harbor.

Langdon served as a member delegate of the Second Continental Congress from 1775 to 1776, serving as a member of its Marine Committee which supervised the beginnings of the Continental Navy. Eleven years later, he was also a delegate to the Constitutional Convention in Philadelphia during the summer of 1787, and subsequently one of the signatories of the U.S. Constitution. He resigned from the Continental Congress in June 1776 to become an agent for the Continental naval forces against the British and superintended the construction of several new American warships including the Raleigh, the America, and the Ranger. The next year in 1777, he equipped an expedition against the British, participating in the Battle of Bennington further west in nearby Vermont, and commanding Langdon's Company of Light Horse Volunteers at the Battles of Saratoga and at Rhode Island.

== Political career ==
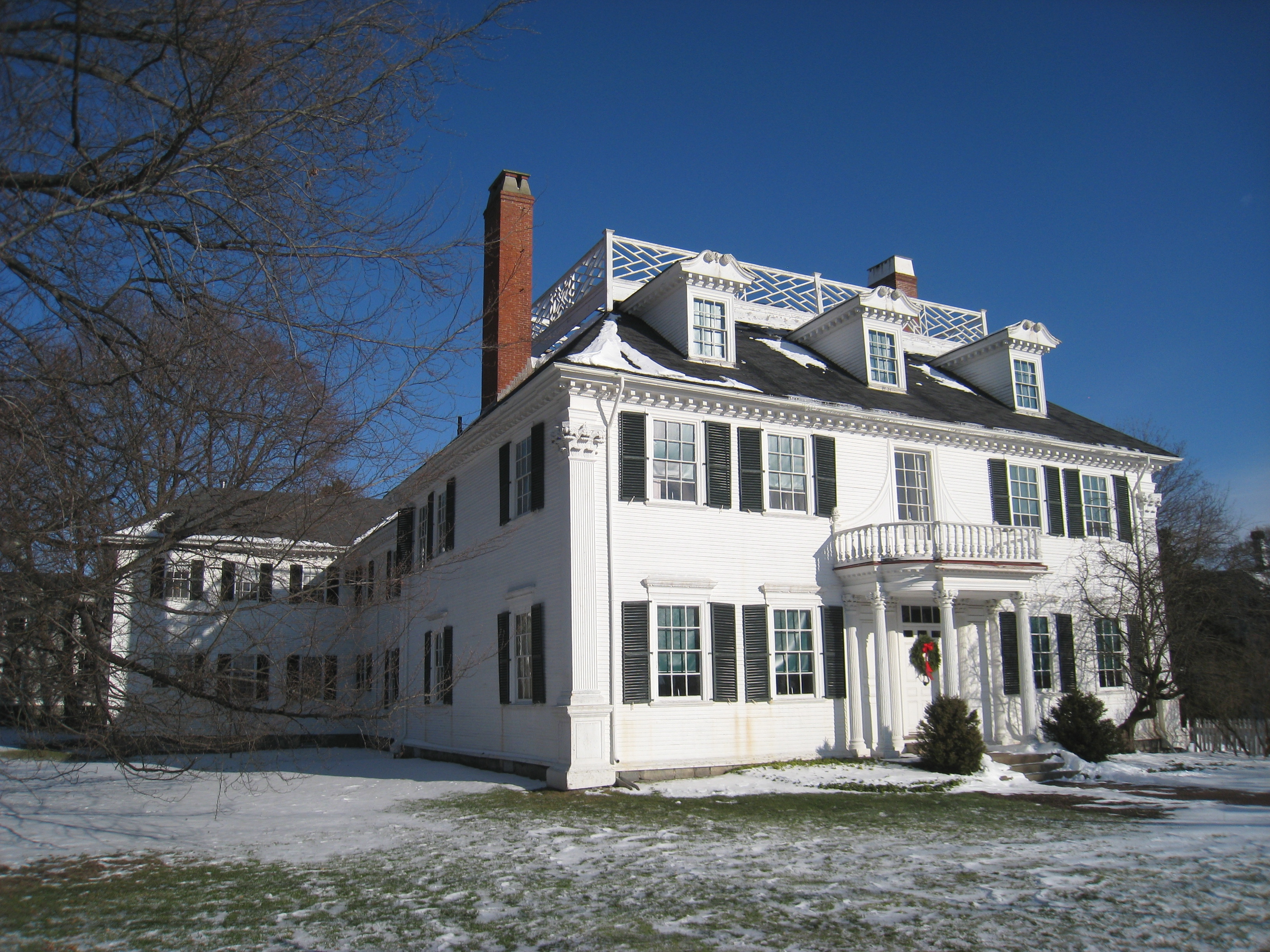
Governor John Langdon House, Portsmouth, New Hampshire

In 1784, he built at Portsmouth the mansion now known as the Governor John Langdon House. Langdon was elected to two terms as president of New Hampshire, once between 1785 and 1786 and again between 1788 and 1789. He was a member of the Congress of the Confederation in 1787 and became president of the Constitutional Convention in 1787, serving as a member of the New Hampshire delegation. Langdon was elected to the U.S. Senate and served from March 4, 1789, to March 3, 1801. He was elected the first president pro tempore of the Senate on April 6, 1789, and also served as president pro tempore during the Second Congress.

During the 1787 constitutional debates in Philadelphia, Langdon spoke out against James Madison's proposed "negative" on state laws simply because he felt that should the Senate be granted this power and not the House of Representatives, it would "hurt the feelings" of House members. Langdon was an ardent supporter of the drive to ratify the Constitution of the United States in New Hampshire. On June 21, 1788, it was ratified by New Hampshire by a vote of 57-47. He immediately wrote to George Washington to inform him that New Hampshire had become the ninth state which he described as the "Key Stone in the Great Arch. Joshua Atherton, who campaigned against ratification, accepted the result and stated, 'It's adopted. Let’s try it'”.

In April 1789, Langdon served as president pro tempore of the U.S. Senate, prior to John Adams' election as vice president, and counted the votes of the electoral college in the first presidential election.

In 1798, Langdon assisted Oney Judge to evade Burwell Bassett, the nephew of George and Martha Washington, who had intended to kidnap Judge and return her to slavery with the Washingtons. That July, he was one of four senators to oppose military force in the Quasi-War.

Langdon served as a member of the New Hampshire Legislature from 1801 to 1805; he served as governor of New Hampshire from 1805 to 1812, except for a year between 1809 and 1810 when he lost to Jeremiah Smith. Prior to again winning election as governor, Langdon unsuccessfully ran for governor in 1802, 1803, and 1804, losing each time to John Taylor Gilman, whom he defeated in 1805. In 1808, his niece, Catherine Whipple Langdon, married Edmund Roberts. Langdon declined the nomination to be a candidate for vice president with James Madison in 1812.

== Death and legacy ==
Langdon died in Portsmouth in 1819 and was interred at the Langdon Tomb in the North Cemetery. The town of Langdon, New Hampshire, is named after him, as is Langdon Street in Madison, Wisconsin, a city with numerous streets named after Founding Fathers.

His nephew, Henry Sherburne Langdon, married Ann Eustis and had a son named John Agustine Langdon Eustis. The latter emigrated to Argentina and died in Buenos Aires in 1876. He had many descendants, who in turn married into the high society of Argentina, such as the Saenz Valiente, Pueyrredon, Obarrio and Beccar Varela families.

== See also ==
- New Hampshire Historical Marker No. 114: North Cemetery
- New Hampshire Historical Marker No. 127: John Langdon (1741–1819)

== Notes ==
Political offices
Preceded by Meshech Weare	Governor of New Hampshire; 1785–1786	Succeeded by John Sullivan
Preceded by John Sullivan	Governor of New Hampshire; 1788–1789	Succeeded by John Sullivan
Preceded by John Taylor Gilman	Governor of New Hampshire; 1805–1809	Succeeded by Jeremiah Smith
Preceded by Jeremiah Smith	Governor of New Hampshire; 1810–1812	Succeeded by William Plumer
New office	President pro tempore of the United States Senate; 1789	Succeeded by Richard Henry Lee
Preceded by Richard Henry Lee	President pro tempore of the United States Senate; 1792–1793	Succeeded by Ralph Izard
U.S. Senate
New seat	U.S. senator (Class 1) from New Hampshire; 1789–1801; Served alongside: Paine Wingate, Samuel Livermore	Succeeded by James Sheafe
Party political offices
Preceded by Timothy Walker	Democratic-Republican nominee for Governor of New Hampshire; 1802, 1803, 1804, 1805, 1806, 1807, 1808, 1809, 1810, 1811	Succeeded by William Plumer
Preceded by George Clinton	Democratic-Republican nominee for Vice President of the United States; Withdrew; 1812	Succeeded by Elbridge Gerry
