= Jeremiah Smith (lawyer) =

American judge (1759–1842)

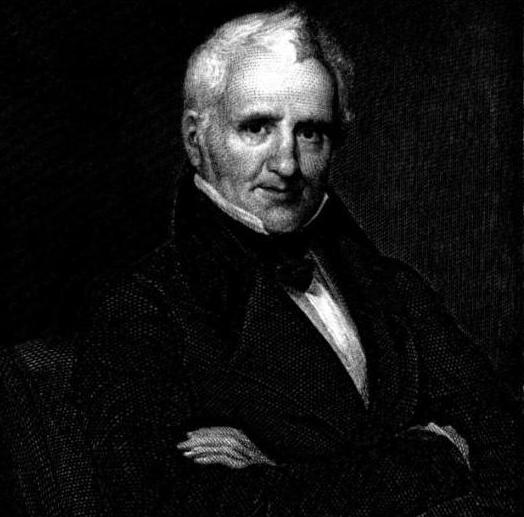
- Frontispiece of 1845's Life of the Hon. Jeremiah Smith by John Hopkins Morison

6th Governor of New Hampshire
- In office June 8, 1809 – June 5, 1810
- Preceded by: John Langdon
- Succeeded by: John Langdon

Judge of the United States Circuit Court for the First Circuit
- In office February 20, 1801 – July 1, 1802
- Appointed by: John Adams
- Preceded by: Seat established by 2 Stat. 89
- Succeeded by: Seat abolished

Member of the U.S. House of Representatives from New Hampshire's at-large district
- In office March 4, 1791 – July 26, 1797
- Preceded by: Abiel Foster
- Succeeded by: Peleg Sprague

Personal details
- Born: Jeremiah Smith; November 29, 1759 Peterborough, Province of New Hampshire, British America
- Died: September 21, 1842 (aged 82) Dover, New Hampshire, U.S.
- Resting place: Winter Street Cemetery; Exeter, New Hampshire
- Party: Federalist
- Relatives: Samuel Smith; Robert Smith
- Education: Harvard College; Queen's College
- Profession: Attorney

Jeremiah Smith (November 29, 1759 – September 21, 1842) was a United States representative for New Hampshire, U.S. attorney for New Hampshire, a United States circuit judge of the United States Circuit Court for the First Circuit, the sixth governor of New Hampshire and chief justice of the New Hampshire Superior Court of Judicature and the New Hampshire Supreme Judicial Court. He was a member of the Federalist Party.

== Early life ==
Born on November 29, 1759, in Peterborough, Province of New Hampshire, British America, Smith was fifth of seven sons born to William Smith, an immigrant from Ireland and Elizabeth (Morison) Smith. Smith's siblings also included three sisters. William Smith was a successful farmer who served in local offices including justice of the peace and was a member of New Hampshire Provincial Congress in 1774. Jeremiah Smith received instruction from his father and several private tutors. He attended Phillips Exeter Academy in Exeter, New Hampshire for his preliminary education.

At age 16, Smith enlisted for the American Revolution in the Continental Army company of Captain Stephen Parker of New Ipswich, New Hampshire. He participated in the Battle of Bennington and was grazed by a musket ball which left a permanent scar on his throat. Smith attended Harvard College, though also graduated from Queen's College (now Rutgers University) in 1780. He returned to military service in 1781and performed garrison duties in and around Peekskill, New York before returning home. In 1782, Smith began to study law with attorney Shearjashub Bourne of Barnstable, Massachusetts, while working as a tutor in the home of Joseph Otis. He completed his legal studies with attorney William Pynchon of Salem, Massachusetts, while serving as headmaster of a school for girls. Smith was admitted to the bar in 1786 and entered private practice in Peterborough.

== Start of career ==
In 1786, Smith was elected Peterborough's town clerk, and in 1787 he was elected as the town's surveyor of highways. In addition, Smith served terms as town agent and a member of Peterborough's board of selectmen. He was a member of the New Hampshire House of Representatives from 1788 to 1791. As a House member, Smith voted against the impeachment of Woodbury Langdon, a judge of the state superior court. The legislature voted in favor, and appointed Langdon to conduct the impeachment, despite the fact that he had voted no. Langdon resigned before the trial took place, and the legislature took no further action.

Smith was a member of the New Hampshire constitutional convention in 1791 and 1792. Though he was not the convention's official clerk, most of its records are in his handwriting. As a delegate, he fought unsuccessfully to remove a clause from the state constitution which required that members of the state legislature adhere to Protestant Christianity.

== Congressman ==
Smith was elected to the United States House of Representatives as a Pro-Administration candidate from New Hampshire's at-large congressional district and served in the 2nd and 3rd United States Congresses. He was reelected as a Federalist and served in the 4th and 5th United States Congresses. Smith was a member of the House from March 4, 1791, until his resignation July 26, 1797. He was Chairman of the United States House Committee on Revisal and Unfinished Business for the 5th United States Congress.

Following his departure from Congress, Smith moved to Exeter, New Hampshire, and served as the United States Attorney for the District of New Hampshire from 1797 to 1800. He was Judge of the Rockingham County, New Hampshire Probate Court from 1800 to 1801.

== Federal judge ==
Smith was nominated by President John Adams on February 18, 1801, to the United States Circuit Court for the First Circuit, to a new seat authorized by 2 Stat. 89. He was confirmed by the United States Senate on February 20, 1801, and received his commission the same day. His service terminated on July 1, 1802, due to abolition of the court.

== Later career ==
Smith was the chief justice of the Superior Court of Judicature of New Hampshire from 1802 to 1809, and chief justice of the Supreme Judicial Court of New Hampshire from 1813 to 1816, his service on the later court terminating due to removal of the court by the legislature. He was the 6th Governor of New Hampshire from 1809 to 1810. He resumed private practice in New Hampshire from 1810 to 1813, and from 1816 to 1820, when he retired.

== Other service and membership ==
Smith served as President of a bank and as treasurer of Phillips Exeter Academy. Following his retirement, he moved to Dover, New Hampshire. Smith was elected a member of the American Antiquarian Society in 1814.

== Honors ==
Smith received the honorary degree of legum Doctor (LL.D.) from Dartmouth College in 1804 and Harvard University in 1807.

== Death ==
Smith died on September 21, 1842, in Dover. He was interred in Winter Street (also called Old) Cemetery in Exeter.

== Family ==
In March 1797, Smith married Eliza Ross of Bladensburg, Maryland, whom he met at the Philadelphia boarding house they were staying at while he was attending a session of Congress and she was attending to her sick mother. Their children included Ariana (1797–1829), William (1799–1830), and Jeremiah (1802–1808).

In 1831, Smith married Elizabeth Hale (1800–1882), a daughter of William Hale. They were the parents of a son, Jeremiah Smith (1837–1921). In addition, they raised the daughter of William Smith and several nieces and nephews, as well as orphans they took into their home.

Smith was the brother of Samuel Smith, a United States representative from New Hampshire, and the uncle of Robert Smith, a United States Representative from Illinois.

== Sources ==
- United States Congress. "Jeremiah Smith (id: S000563)". Biographical Directory of the United States Congress.
- Jeremiah Smith at the Biographical Directory of Federal Judges, a publication of the Federal Judicial Center.

Party political offices
| Preceded by John Taylor Gilman | Federalist nominee for Governor of New Hampshire; 1809, 1810, 1811 | Succeeded by John Taylor Gilman |
U.S. House of Representatives
| Preceded by Abiel Foster | United States Representative from New Hampshire's at-large congressional district 1791–1797 | Succeeded by Peleg Sprague |
Legal offices
| Preceded by Edward St. Loe Livermore | United States Attorney for the District of New Hampshire; 1797–1800 | Succeeded by Edward St. Loe Livermore |
| Preceded by Seat established by 2 Stat. 89 | Judge of the United States Circuit Court for the First Circuit; 1801–1802 | Succeeded by Seat abolished |
Political offices
| Preceded by John Langdon | 6th Governor of New Hampshire; 1809–1810 | Succeeded by John Langdon |
