= Political party strength in New Hampshire =

Politics in the US state of New Hampshire

== Party affiliation ==
=== Current ===
Party registration as of May 4, 2026
Party	Number of voters	Fraction
Undeclared	377,158	39.4%
Republican	314,005	32.8%
Democratic	265,183	27.7%
Total	956,346	100.0%

== Partisan affiliation of elected officials ==
The following table indicates the party of elected officials in the U.S. state of New Hampshire:

- Governor

The table also indicates the historical party composition in the:

- Executive Council
- State Senate
- State House of Representatives
- State delegation to the U.S. Senate
- State delegation to the U.S. House of Representatives

For years in which a presidential election was held, the table indicates which party's nominees received the state's electoral votes.

=== Pre-statehood–1882 ===
Year	Executive office		General Court		United States Congress						Electoral votes
Year	Governor	Exec. Council	State Senate	State House	Senator (Class II)	Senator (Class III)	House				Electoral votes
1631 – 1636	Thomas Wiggin (Note: Governor of the Upper Plantation of New Hampshire.)										
1637 – 1640	George Burdett										
1641	…										
1776 – 1784	Meshech Weare (N)	[?]									
1785	John Langdon (N)	[?]									
1786	John Sullivan (F)	[?]									
1787	John Sullivan (F)	[?]									
1788	John Langdon (DR)	[?]									
1789	John Sullivan (F) (Note: Resigned to take a seat on a federal court.)	[?]			Paine Wingate (AA)	John Langdon (PA)	3PA				George Washington/ John Adams (I) ✓
1790	Josiah Bartlett (DR)	[?]			Paine Wingate (AA)	John Langdon (PA)	3PA				George Washington/ John Adams (I) ✓
1791	Josiah Bartlett (DR)	[?]			Paine Wingate (AA)	John Langdon (PA)	3PA				George Washington/ John Adams (I) ✓
1792	Josiah Bartlett (DR)	[?]			Paine Wingate (AA)	John Langdon (PA)	3PA				George Washington/ John Adams (I) ✓
1793	Josiah Bartlett (DR)	[?]			Samuel Livermore (PA)	John Langdon (AA)	3PA, 1AA				George Washington/ John Adams (I) ✓
1794	John Taylor Gilman (F)	[?]			Samuel Livermore (PA)	John Langdon (AA)	3PA, 1AA				George Washington/ John Adams (I) ✓
1795	John Taylor Gilman (F)	[?]	F majority	F majority	Samuel Livermore (F)	John Langdon (DR)	3F, 1DR				George Washington/ John Adams (I) ✓
1796	John Taylor Gilman (F)	[?]	F majority	F majority	Samuel Livermore (F)	John Langdon (DR)	3F, 1DR				John Adams ✓ / Oliver Ellsworth ✗ (F)
1797	John Taylor Gilman (F)	[?]	F majority	F majority	Samuel Livermore (F)	John Langdon (DR)	4F				John Adams ✓ / Oliver Ellsworth ✗ (F)
1798	John Taylor Gilman (F)	[?]	F majority	F majority	Samuel Livermore (F)	John Langdon (DR)	4F				John Adams ✓ / Oliver Ellsworth ✗ (F)
1799	John Taylor Gilman (F)	[?]	F majority	F majority	Samuel Livermore (F)	John Langdon (DR)	4F				John Adams ✓ / Oliver Ellsworth ✗ (F)
1800	John Taylor Gilman (F)	[?]	11F, 1DR	F majority	Samuel Livermore (F)	John Langdon (DR)	4F				John Adams/ Charles Cotesworth Pinckney (F) ✗
1801	John Taylor Gilman (F)	[?]	11F, 1DR	F majority	Simeon Olcott (F)	James Sheafe (F)	4F				John Adams/ Charles Cotesworth Pinckney (F) ✗
1802	John Taylor Gilman (F)	[?]	9F, 3DR	F majority	Simeon Olcott (F)	William Plumer (F)	4F				John Adams/ Charles Cotesworth Pinckney (F) ✗
1803	John Taylor Gilman (F)	[?]	7F, 5DR	84F, 69DR	Simeon Olcott (F)	William Plumer (F)	5F				John Adams/ Charles Cotesworth Pinckney (F) ✗
1804	John Taylor Gilman (F)	[?]	6DR, 6F (Note: A Democratic-Republican, Nicholas Gilman, was elected as President of the Senate.)	87DR, 75F	Simeon Olcott (F)	William Plumer (F)	5F				Thomas Jefferson/ George Clinton (DR) ✓
1805	John Langdon (DR)	[?]	8DR, 4F	92DR, 71F	Nicholas Gilman (DR)	William Plumer (F)	5F				Thomas Jefferson/ George Clinton (DR) ✓
1806	John Langdon (DR)	[?]	10DR, 2F	108DR, 52F	Nicholas Gilman (DR)	William Plumer (F)	5F				Thomas Jefferson/ George Clinton (DR) ✓
1807	John Langdon (DR)	[?]	8DR, 4F	DR majority	Nicholas Gilman (DR)	Nahum Parker (DR)	5DR				Thomas Jefferson/ George Clinton (DR) ✓
1808	John Langdon (DR)	[?]	9DR, 3F	99DR, 63F	Nicholas Gilman (DR)	Nahum Parker (DR)	5DR				Charles Cotesworth Pinckney/ Rufus King (F) ✗
1809	Jeremiah Smith (F)	[?]	7F, 5DR	99DR, 67F	Nicholas Gilman (DR)	Nahum Parker (DR)	5F				Charles Cotesworth Pinckney/ Rufus King (F) ✗
1810	John Langdon (DR)	[?]	7DR, 5F	91DR, 81F	Nicholas Gilman (DR)	Charles Cutts (DR)	5F				Charles Cotesworth Pinckney/ Rufus King (F) ✗
1811	John Langdon (DR)	[?]	8DR, 4F	98DR, 77F	Nicholas Gilman (DR)	Charles Cutts (DR)	4DR, 1F				Charles Cotesworth Pinckney/ Rufus King (F) ✗
1812	William Plumer (DR)	[?]	7DR, 5F	104DR, 79F	Nicholas Gilman (DR)	Charles Cutts (DR)	4DR, 1F				DeWitt Clinton/ Jared Ingersoll (F) ✗
1813	John Taylor Gilman (F)	[?]	9F, 3DR	106F, 75DR	Nicholas Gilman (DR)	Jeremiah Mason (F)	6F				DeWitt Clinton/ Jared Ingersoll (F) ✗
1814	John Taylor Gilman (F)	[?]	8F, 4DR	98F, 89DR	Thomas W. Thompson (F)	Jeremiah Mason (F)	6F				DeWitt Clinton/ Jared Ingersoll (F) ✗
1815	John Taylor Gilman (F)	[?]	8F, 4DR	102F, 86DR	Thomas W. Thompson (F)	Jeremiah Mason (F)	6F				DeWitt Clinton/ Jared Ingersoll (F) ✗
1816	William Plumer (DR)	[?]	8DR, 4F	105DR, 84F	Thomas W. Thompson (F)	Jeremiah Mason (F)	6F				James Monroe/ Daniel D. Tompkins (DR) ✓
1817	William Plumer (DR)	[?]	11DR, 1F	107DR, 87F	David L. Morril (DR)	Clement Storer (DR)	6DR				James Monroe/ Daniel D. Tompkins (DR) ✓
1818	William Plumer (DR)	[?]	10DR, 2F	119DR, 75F	David L. Morril (DR)	Clement Storer (DR)	6DR				James Monroe/ Daniel D. Tompkins (DR) ✓
1819	Samuel Bell (DR)	[?]	11DR, 1F	124DR, 70F	David L. Morril (DR)	John F. Parrott (DR)	6DR				James Monroe/ Daniel D. Tompkins (DR) ✓
1820	Samuel Bell (DR)	[?]	DR majority	DR majority	David L. Morril (DR)	John F. Parrott (DR)	6DR				James Monroe/ Daniel D. Tompkins (DR) ✓
1821	Samuel Bell (DR)	[?]	DR majority	DR majority	David L. Morril (DR)	John F. Parrott (DR)	6DR				James Monroe/ Daniel D. Tompkins (DR) ✓
1822	Samuel Bell (DR)	[?]	DR majority	DR majority	David L. Morril (DR)	John F. Parrott (DR)	6DR				James Monroe/ Daniel D. Tompkins (DR) ✓
1823	Levi Woodbury (DR)	[?]	DR majority	DR majority	Samuel Bell (DR)	John F. Parrott (DR)	6 Adams-Clay DR				James Monroe/ Daniel D. Tompkins (DR) ✓
1824	David L. Morril (DR)	[?]	DR majority	DR majority	Samuel Bell (DR)	John F. Parrott (DR)	6 Adams-Clay DR				John Quincy Adams/ John C. Calhoun (DR) ✓
1825	David L. Morril (DR)	[?]	10J, 2NR	104J, 101NR, 5 vac.	Samuel Bell (NR)	Levi Woodbury (J)	5NR, 1J				John Quincy Adams/ John C. Calhoun (DR) ✓
1826	David L. Morril (DR)	[?]	8J, 4NR	98J, 91NR, 18?, 4 vac. (Note: A Jacksonian, Henry Hubbard, was re-elected as Speaker.)	Samuel Bell (NR)	Levi Woodbury (J)	5NR, 1J				John Quincy Adams/ John C. Calhoun (DR) ✓
1827	Benjamin Pierce (DR)	[?]	11J, 1NR	89NR, 84J, 40?, 2 vac.	Samuel Bell (NR)	Levi Woodbury (J)	5NR, 1J				John Quincy Adams/ John C. Calhoun (DR) ✓
1828	John Bell (NR)	[?]	10NR, 2J	92NR, 84J, 30?, 2 vac. (Note: A National Republican, James Wilson II, was elected as Speaker.)	Samuel Bell (NR)	Levi Woodbury (J)	5NR, 1J				John Quincy Adams/ Richard Rush (NR) ✗
1829	Benjamin Pierce (D)	[?]	8J, 4NR	99J, 82NR	Samuel Bell (NR)	Levi Woodbury (J)	6J				John Quincy Adams/ Richard Rush (NR) ✗
1830	Matthew Harvey (D) (Note: Resigned to take a seat on the U.S. District Court for New Hampshire.)	[?]	9J, 3NR	111J, 101NR	Samuel Bell (NR)	Levi Woodbury (J)	6J				John Quincy Adams/ Richard Rush (NR) ✗
1831	Joseph M. Harper (D) (Note: As president of the state senate, acted as governor for unexpired term.)	[?]	10J, 2NR	140J, 73NR	Samuel Bell (NR)	Isaac Hill (J)	6J				John Quincy Adams/ Richard Rush (NR) ✗
1831	Samuel Dinsmoor (D)	[?]	10J, 2NR	140J, 73NR	Samuel Bell (NR)	Isaac Hill (J)	6J				John Quincy Adams/ Richard Rush (NR) ✗
1832	Samuel Dinsmoor (D)	[?]	11J, 1NR	144D, 52NR, 26?	Samuel Bell (NR)	Isaac Hill (J)	6J				Andrew Jackson/ Martin Van Buren (D) ✓
1833	Samuel Dinsmoor (D)	[?]	11J, 1NR	125J, 42NR	Samuel Bell (NR)	Isaac Hill (J)	5J				Andrew Jackson/ Martin Van Buren (D) ✓
1834	William Badger (D)	[?]	12D	150D, 46W	Samuel Bell (NR)	Isaac Hill (J)	5J				Andrew Jackson/ Martin Van Buren (D) ✓
1835	William Badger (D)	[?]	11D, 1W	150D, 58W	Henry Hubbard (J)	Isaac Hill (J)	5J				Andrew Jackson/ Martin Van Buren (D) ✓
1836	Isaac Hill (D)	[?]	11D, 1W	168D, 46W	Henry Hubbard (J)	John Page (J)	5J				Martin Van Buren/ Richard Mentor Johnson (D) ✓
1837	Isaac Hill (D)	[?]	11D, 1W	177D, 51W	Henry Hubbard (D)	Franklin Pierce (D)	5D				Martin Van Buren/ Richard Mentor Johnson (D) ✓
1838	Isaac Hill (D)	[?]	8D, 4W	129D, 116W	Henry Hubbard (D)	Franklin Pierce (D)	5D				Martin Van Buren/ Richard Mentor Johnson (D) ✓
1839	John Page (D)	[?]	10D, 2W	154D, 91W	Henry Hubbard (D)	Franklin Pierce (D)	5D				Martin Van Buren/ Richard Mentor Johnson (D) ✓
1840	John Page (D)	[?]	10D, 2W	171D, 69W	Henry Hubbard (D)	Franklin Pierce (D)	5D				Martin Van Buren (D) ✗
1841	John Page (D)	[?]	10D, 2W	161D, 85W	Levi Woodbury (D)	Franklin Pierce (D)	5D				Martin Van Buren (D) ✗
1842	Henry Hubbard (D)	[?]	11D, 1W	166D, 64W	Levi Woodbury (D)	Leonard Wilcox (D)	5D				Martin Van Buren (D) ✗
1843	Henry Hubbard (D)	[?]	10D, 2W	139D, 98W	Levi Woodbury (D)	Charles G. Atherton (D)	4D				Martin Van Buren (D) ✗
1844	John Hardy Steele (D)	[?]	11D, 1W	153D, 81W	Levi Woodbury (D)	Charles G. Atherton (D)	4D				James K. Polk/ George M. Dallas (D) ✓
1845	John Hardy Steele (D)	[?]	12D	156D, 74W, 7Lty	Levi Woodbury (D)	Charles G. Atherton (D)	3D, 1 Vacant				James K. Polk/ George M. Dallas (D) ✓
1846	Anthony Colby (W)	[?]	7W, 4D, 1I	124D, 107W, 32I, 11Lty (Note: A coalition of Whigs, Independent Democrats, and Liberty Partiers elected John P. Hale, then an Independent Democrat, to be Speaker, and they organized the chamber.)	Benning W. Jenness (D)	Charles G. Atherton (D)	3D, 1 Vacant				James K. Polk/ George M. Dallas (D) ✓
1846	Anthony Colby (W)	[?]	7W, 4D, 1I	124D, 107W, 32I, 11Lty	Joseph Cilley (Lty)	Charles G. Atherton (D)	3D, 1 Vacant				James K. Polk/ George M. Dallas (D) ✓
1847	Jared W. Williams (D)	[?]	11D, 1W	146D, 136W	John P. Hale (ID)	Charles G. Atherton (D)	NH-1	NH-2	NH-3	NH-4	James K. Polk/ George M. Dallas (D) ✓
1847	Jared W. Williams (D)	[?]	11D, 1W	146D, 136W	John P. Hale (ID)	Charles G. Atherton (D)	Amos Tuck (I)	Charles H. Peaslee (D)	James Wilson II (W)	James Hutchins; Johnson (D)	James K. Polk/ George M. Dallas (D) ✓
1848	Jared W. Williams (D)	[?]	10D, 2W	159D, 121W	John P. Hale (ID)	Charles G. Atherton (D)	Amos Tuck (I)	Charles H. Peaslee (D)	James Wilson II (W)	James Hutchins; Johnson (D)	Lewis Cass/ William O. Butler (D) ✗
1849	Samuel Dinsmoor Jr. (D)	[?]	11D, 1W	158D, 107W	John P. Hale (FS)	Moses Norris Jr. (D)	Amos Tuck (FS)	Charles H. Peaslee (D)	James Wilson II (W)	Harry Hibbard (D)	Lewis Cass/ William O. Butler (D) ✗
1850	Samuel Dinsmoor Jr. (D)	[?]	11D, 1W	189D, 86W	John P. Hale (FS)	Moses Norris Jr. (D)	Amos Tuck (FS)	Charles H. Peaslee (D)	George W. Morrison (D)	Harry Hibbard (D)	Lewis Cass/ William O. Butler (D) ✗
1851	Samuel Dinsmoor Jr. (D)	[?]	10D, 2W	114D, 114W, 54FS, 10 vac. (Note: A Democrat, Nathaniel B. Baker, was elected as Speaker.)	John P. Hale (FS)	Moses Norris Jr. (D)	Amos Tuck (W)	Charles H. Peaslee (D)	Jared Perkins (W)	Harry Hibbard (D)	Lewis Cass/ William O. Butler (D) ✗
1852	Noah Martin (D)	[?]	10D, 2W	141D, 101W, 32FS, 4I	John P. Hale (FS)	Moses Norris Jr. (D)	Amos Tuck (W)	Charles H. Peaslee (D)	Jared Perkins (W)	Harry Hibbard (D)	Franklin Pierce/ William R. King (D) ✓
1853	Noah Martin (D)	[?]	11D, 1W	178D, 92W, 34FS	Charles G. Atherton (D)	Moses Norris Jr. (D)	Dist. 1		Dist. 2	Dist. 3	Franklin Pierce/ William R. King (D) ✓
1853	Noah Martin (D)	[?]	11D, 1W	178D, 92W, 34FS	Charles G. Atherton (D)	Moses Norris Jr. (D)	George W. Kittredge (D)		George W. Morrison (D)	Harry Hibbard (D)	Franklin Pierce/ William R. King (D) ✓
1854	Nathaniel B. Baker (D)	[?]	10D, 2W	160D, 145W, 1?, 5 vac.	Jared W. Williams (D)	Moses Norris Jr. (D)	George W. Kittredge (D)		George W. Morrison (D)	Harry Hibbard (D)	Franklin Pierce/ William R. King (D) ✓
1855	Ralph Metcalf (KN)	[?]	11KN, 1D	227R, 79D, 2?, 5 vac.	vacant	John S. Wells (D)	James Pike (KN)		Mason Tappan (KN)	Aaron H. Cragin (KN)	Franklin Pierce/ William R. King (D) ✓
1855	Ralph Metcalf (KN)	[?]	11KN, 1D	227R, 79D, 2?, 5 vac.	John P. Hale (R)	James Bell (R)	James Pike (KN)		Mason Tappan (KN)	Aaron H. Cragin (KN)	Franklin Pierce/ William R. King (D) ✓
1856	Ralph Metcalf (KN)	[?]	8KN, 4D	168R, 146D	John P. Hale (R)	James Bell (R)	James Pike (KN)		Mason Tappan (KN)	Aaron H. Cragin (KN)	John C. Frémont/ William L. Dayton (R) ✗
1857	William Haile (R)	[?]	8R, 4D	196R, 128D, 4 vac.	John P. Hale (R)	Daniel Clark (R)	James Pike (R)		Mason Tappan (R)	Aaron H. Cragin (R)	John C. Frémont/ William L. Dayton (R) ✗
1858	William Haile (R)	[?]	9R, 3D	196R, 119D	John P. Hale (R)	Daniel Clark (R)	James Pike (R)		Mason Tappan (R)	Aaron H. Cragin (R)	John C. Frémont/ William L. Dayton (R) ✗
1859	Ichabod Goodwin (R)	[?]	8R, 4D	199R, 126D	John P. Hale (R)	Daniel Clark (R)	Gilman Marston (R)		Mason Tappan (R)	Thomas M. Edwards (R)	John C. Frémont/ William L. Dayton (R) ✗
1860	Ichabod Goodwin (R)	[?]	10R, 2D	206R, 121D	John P. Hale (R)	Daniel Clark (R)	Gilman Marston (R)		Mason Tappan (R)	Thomas M. Edwards (R)	Abraham Lincoln/ Hannibal Hamlin (R) ✓
1861	Nathaniel S. Berry (R)	[?]	10R, 2D	200R, 121D	John P. Hale (R)	Daniel Clark (R)	Gilman Marston (R)		Edward H. Rollins (R)	Thomas M. Edwards (R)	Abraham Lincoln/ Hannibal Hamlin (R) ✓
1862	Nathaniel S. Berry (R)	[?]	9R, 3D	203R, 120D	John P. Hale (R)	Daniel Clark (R)	Gilman Marston (R)		Edward H. Rollins (R)	Thomas M. Edwards (R)	Abraham Lincoln/ Hannibal Hamlin (R) ✓
1863	Joseph A. Gilmore (R)	[?]	9R, 3D	190R, 141D	John P. Hale (R)	Daniel Clark (R)	Daniel Marcy (D)		Edward H. Rollins (R)	James W. Patterson (R)	Abraham Lincoln/ Hannibal Hamlin (R) ✓
1864	Joseph A. Gilmore (R)	[?]	9R, 3D	210R, 123D	John P. Hale (R)	Daniel Clark (R)	Daniel Marcy (D)		Edward H. Rollins (R)	James W. Patterson (R)	Abraham Lincoln/ Andrew Johnson (NU) ✓
1865	Frederick Smyth (R)	[?]	9R, 3D	214R, 114D	Aaron H. Cragin (R)	Daniel Clark (R)	Gilman Marston (R)		Edward H. Rollins (R)	James W. Patterson (R)	Abraham Lincoln/ Andrew Johnson (NU) ✓
1866	Frederick Smyth (R)	[?]	9R, 3D	208R, 114D	Aaron H. Cragin (R)	George G. Fogg (R)	Gilman Marston (R)		Edward H. Rollins (R)	James W. Patterson (R)	Abraham Lincoln/ Andrew Johnson (NU) ✓
1867	Walter Harriman (R)	[?]	9R, 3D	202R, 128D	Aaron H. Cragin (R)	James W. Patterson (R)	Jacob Hart Ela (R)		Aaron Fletcher; Stevens (R)	Jacob Benton (R)	Abraham Lincoln/ Andrew Johnson (NU) ✓
1868	Walter Harriman (R)	[?]	9R, 3D	194R, 138D	Aaron H. Cragin (R)	James W. Patterson (R)	Jacob Hart Ela (R)		Aaron Fletcher; Stevens (R)	Jacob Benton (R)	Ulysses S. Grant/ Schuyler Colfax (R) ✓
1869	Onslow Stearns (R)	[?]	9R, 3D	194R, 140D	Aaron H. Cragin (R)	James W. Patterson (R)	Jacob Hart Ela (R)		Aaron Fletcher; Stevens (R)	Jacob Benton (R)	Ulysses S. Grant/ Schuyler Colfax (R) ✓
1870	Onslow Stearns (R)	[?]	11R, 1D	201R, 126D	Aaron H. Cragin (R)	James W. Patterson (R)	Jacob Hart Ela (R)		Aaron Fletcher; Stevens (R)	Jacob Benton (R)	Ulysses S. Grant/ Schuyler Colfax (R) ✓
1871	James A. Weston (D)	[?]	6D, 6R (Note: A Democrat, George W. M. Pittman, was elected Senate President.)	165D, 164R	Aaron H. Cragin (R)	James W. Patterson (R)	Ellery Albee Hibbard (D)		Samuel Newell Bell (D)	Hosea W. Parker (D)	Ulysses S. Grant/ Schuyler Colfax (R) ✓
1872	Ezekiel A. Straw (R)	[?]	8R, 4D	210R, 150D	Aaron H. Cragin (R)	James W. Patterson (R)	Ellery Albee Hibbard (D)		Samuel Newell Bell (D)	Hosea W. Parker (D)	Ulysses S. Grant/ Henry Wilson (R) ✓
1873	Ezekiel A. Straw (R)	[?]	9R, 3D	204R, 144D	Aaron H. Cragin (R)	Bainbridge Wadleigh (R)	William B. Small (R)		Austin F. Pike (R)	Hosea W. Parker (D)	Ulysses S. Grant/ Henry Wilson (R) ✓
1874	James A. Weston (D)	[?]	8D, 4R	177D, 164R	Aaron H. Cragin (R)	Bainbridge Wadleigh (R)	William B. Small (R)		Austin F. Pike (R)	Hosea W. Parker (D)	Ulysses S. Grant/ Henry Wilson (R) ✓
1875	Person Colby Cheney (R)	[?]	7D, 5R	191R, 182D	Aaron H. Cragin (R)	Bainbridge Wadleigh (R)	Frank Jones (D)		Samuel Newell Bell (D)	Henry W. Blair (R)	Ulysses S. Grant/ Henry Wilson (R) ✓
1876	Person Colby Cheney (R)	[?]	9R, 3D	211R, 180D	Aaron H. Cragin (R)	Bainbridge Wadleigh (R)	Frank Jones (D)		Samuel Newell Bell (D)	Henry W. Blair (R)	Rutherford B. Hayes/ William A. Wheeler (R) ✓
1877	Benjamin F. Prescott (R)	[?]	8R, 4D	224R, 155D	Edward H. Rollins (R)	Bainbridge Wadleigh (R)	Frank Jones (D)		James F. Briggs (R)	Henry W. Blair (R)	Rutherford B. Hayes/ William A. Wheeler (R) ✓
1878	Benjamin F. Prescott (R)	[?]	8R, 4D	216R, 170D	Edward H. Rollins (R)	Bainbridge Wadleigh (R)	Frank Jones (D)		James F. Briggs (R)	Henry W. Blair (R)	Rutherford B. Hayes/ William A. Wheeler (R) ✓
1879	Nathaniel Head (R)	[?]	20R, 4D	168R, 100D, 11GB	Edward H. Rollins (R)	Charles H. Bell (R)	Joshua G. Hall (R)		James F. Briggs (R)	Evarts W. Farr (R)	Rutherford B. Hayes/ William A. Wheeler (R) ✓
1880	Nathaniel Head (R)	[?]	20R, 4D	168R, 100D, 11GB	Edward H. Rollins (R)	Henry W. Blair (R)	Joshua G. Hall (R)		James F. Briggs (R)	Evarts W. Farr (R)	James A. Garfield/ Chester A. Arthur (R) ✓
1881	Charles H. Bell (R)	[?]	16R, 8D	179R, 114D	Edward H. Rollins (R)	Henry W. Blair (R)	Joshua G. Hall (R)		James F. Briggs (R)	Ossian Ray (R)	James A. Garfield/ Chester A. Arthur (R) ✓
1882	Charles H. Bell (R)	[?]	16R, 8D	179R, 114D	Edward H. Rollins (R)	Henry W. Blair (R)	Joshua G. Hall (R)		James F. Briggs (R)	Ossian Ray (R)	James A. Garfield/ Chester A. Arthur (R) ✓

=== 1883–present ===
Year	Executive office		General Court		United States Congress				Electoral votes
Year	Governor	Executive Council	State Senate	State House	Senator (Class II)	Senator (Class III)	House District 1	House District 2	Electoral votes
1883	Samuel W. Hale (R)	[?]	17R, 7D	188R, 121D, 1I	Austin F. Pike (R)	Henry W. Blair (R)	Martin A. Haynes (R)	Ossian Ray (R)	
1884	Samuel W. Hale (R)	[?]	17R, 7D	188R, 121D, 1I	Austin F. Pike (R)	Henry W. Blair (R)	Martin A. Haynes (R)	Ossian Ray (R)	James G. Blaine/ John A. Logan (R) ✗
1885	Moody Currier (R)	[?]	15R, 8D, 1P (Note: Following the death of Republican State Senator Hiram T. Morrill on July 7, 1885, the General Court elected Prohibition Party candidate Frank G. Thurston to fill the vacancy.)	183R, 122D	Austin F. Pike (R)	Henry W. Blair (R)	Martin A. Haynes (R)	Jacob H. Gallinger (R)	James G. Blaine/ John A. Logan (R) ✗
1886	Moody Currier (R)	[?]	15R, 8D, 1P	183R, 122D	Austin F. Pike (R)	Henry W. Blair (R)	Martin A. Haynes (R)	Jacob H. Gallinger (R)	James G. Blaine/ John A. Logan (R) ✗
1887	Charles H. Sawyer (R)	[?]	15R, 9D	169R, 138D	Person Colby Cheney (R)	Henry W. Blair (R)	Luther F. McKinney (D)	Jacob H. Gallinger (R)	James G. Blaine/ John A. Logan (R) ✗
1888	Charles H. Sawyer (R)	[?]	15R, 9D	169R, 138D	William E. Chandler (R)	Henry W. Blair (R)	Luther F. McKinney (D)	Jacob H. Gallinger (R)	Benjamin Harrison/ Levi P. Morton (R) ✓
1889	David H. Goodell (R)	[?]	18R, 6D	169R, 144D	Gilman Marston (R)	Henry W. Blair (R)	Alonzo Nute (R)	Orren C. Moore (R)	Benjamin Harrison/ Levi P. Morton (R) ✓
1890	David H. Goodell (R)	[?]	18R, 6D	169R, 144D	William E. Chandler (R)	Henry W. Blair (R)	Alonzo Nute (R)	Orren C. Moore (R)	Benjamin Harrison/ Levi P. Morton (R) ✓
1891	Hiram A. Tuttle (R)	[?]	14R, 10D	185R, 170D	William E. Chandler (R)	Jacob H. Gallinger (R)	Luther F. McKinney (D)	Warren F. Daniell (D)	Benjamin Harrison/ Levi P. Morton (R) ✓
1892	Hiram A. Tuttle (R)	[?]	14R, 10D	185R, 170D	William E. Chandler (R)	Jacob H. Gallinger (R)	Luther F. McKinney (D)	Warren F. Daniell (D)	Benjamin Harrison/ Whitelaw Reid (R) ✗
1893	John Butler Smith (R)	[?]	15R, 9D	209R, 149D	William E. Chandler (R)	Jacob H. Gallinger (R)	Henry W. Blair (R)	Henry M. Baker (R)	Benjamin Harrison/ Whitelaw Reid (R) ✗
1894	John Butler Smith (R)	[?]	15R, 9D	209R, 149D	William E. Chandler (R)	Jacob H. Gallinger (R)	Henry W. Blair (R)	Henry M. Baker (R)	Benjamin Harrison/ Whitelaw Reid (R) ✗
1895	Charles A. Busiel (R)	[?]	21R, 3D	264R, 99D	William E. Chandler (R)	Jacob H. Gallinger (R)	Cyrus A. Sulloway (R)	Henry M. Baker (R)	Benjamin Harrison/ Whitelaw Reid (R) ✗
1896	Charles A. Busiel (R)	[?]	21R, 3D	264R, 99D	William E. Chandler (R)	Jacob H. Gallinger (R)	Cyrus A. Sulloway (R)	Henry M. Baker (R)	William McKinley/ Garret Hobart (R) ✓
1897	George A. Ramsdell (R)	[?]	22R, 2D	291R, 66D	William E. Chandler (R)	Jacob H. Gallinger (R)	Cyrus A. Sulloway (R)	Frank G. Clarke (R)	William McKinley/ Garret Hobart (R) ✓
1898	George A. Ramsdell (R)	[?]	22R, 2D	291R, 66D	William E. Chandler (R)	Jacob H. Gallinger (R)	Cyrus A. Sulloway (R)	Frank G. Clarke (R)	William McKinley/ Garret Hobart (R) ✓
1899	Frank W. Rollins (R)	[?]	22R, 2D	250R, 109D, 1ID	William E. Chandler (R)	Jacob H. Gallinger (R)	Cyrus A. Sulloway (R)	Frank G. Clarke (R)	William McKinley/ Garret Hobart (R) ✓
1900	Frank W. Rollins (R)	[?]	22R, 2D	250R, 109D, 1ID	William E. Chandler (R)	Jacob H. Gallinger (R)	Cyrus A. Sulloway (R)	Frank G. Clarke (R)	William McKinley/ Theodore Roosevelt (R) ✓
1901	Chester B. Jordan (R)	[?]	23R, 1D	300R, 97D	Henry E. Burnham (R)	Jacob H. Gallinger (R)	Cyrus A. Sulloway (R)	Frank D. Currier (R)	William McKinley/ Theodore Roosevelt (R) ✓
1902	Chester B. Jordan (R)	[?]	23R, 1D	300R, 97D	Henry E. Burnham (R)	Jacob H. Gallinger (R)	Cyrus A. Sulloway (R)	Frank D. Currier (R)	William McKinley/ Theodore Roosevelt (R) ✓
1903	Nahum J. Bachelder (R)	[?]	20R, 4D	257R, 136D	Henry E. Burnham (R)	Jacob H. Gallinger (R)	Cyrus A. Sulloway (R)	Frank D. Currier (R)	William McKinley/ Theodore Roosevelt (R) ✓
1904	Nahum J. Bachelder (R)	[?]	20R, 4D	257R, 136D	Henry E. Burnham (R)	Jacob H. Gallinger (R)	Cyrus A. Sulloway (R)	Frank D. Currier (R)	Theodore Roosevelt/ Charles W. Fairbanks (R) ✓
1905	John McLane (R)	[?]	21R, 3D	286R, 105D	Henry E. Burnham (R)	Jacob H. Gallinger (R)	Cyrus A. Sulloway (R)	Frank D. Currier (R)	Theodore Roosevelt/ Charles W. Fairbanks (R) ✓
1906	John McLane (R)	[?]	21R, 3D	286R, 105D	Henry E. Burnham (R)	Jacob H. Gallinger (R)	Cyrus A. Sulloway (R)	Frank D. Currier (R)	Theodore Roosevelt/ Charles W. Fairbanks (R) ✓
1907	Charles M. Floyd (R)	[?]	18R, 6D	262R, 128D, 1I	Henry E. Burnham (R)	Jacob H. Gallinger (R)	Cyrus A. Sulloway (R)	Frank D. Currier (R)	Theodore Roosevelt/ Charles W. Fairbanks (R) ✓
1908	Charles M. Floyd (R)	[?]	18R, 6D	262R, 128D, 1I	Henry E. Burnham (R)	Jacob H. Gallinger (R)	Cyrus A. Sulloway (R)	Frank D. Currier (R)	William Howard Taft/ James S. Sherman (R) ✓
1909	Henry B. Quinby (R)	[?]	20R, 4D	269R, 117D, 1I	Henry E. Burnham (R)	Jacob H. Gallinger (R)	Cyrus A. Sulloway (R)	Frank D. Currier (R)	William Howard Taft/ James S. Sherman (R) ✓
1910	Henry B. Quinby (R)	[?]	20R, 4D	269R, 117D, 1I	Henry E. Burnham (R)	Jacob H. Gallinger (R)	Cyrus A. Sulloway (R)	Frank D. Currier (R)	William Howard Taft/ James S. Sherman (R) ✓
1911	Robert P. Bass (R)	[?]	16R, 8D	220R, 173D	Henry E. Burnham (R)	Jacob H. Gallinger (R)	Cyrus A. Sulloway (R)	Frank D. Currier (R)	William Howard Taft/ James S. Sherman (R) ✓
1912	Robert P. Bass (R)	[?]	16R, 8D	220R, 173D	Henry E. Burnham (R)	Jacob H. Gallinger (R)	Cyrus A. Sulloway (R)	Frank D. Currier (R)	Woodrow Wilson/ Thomas R. Marshall (D) ✓
1913	Samuel D. Felker (D)	[?]	14D, 10R	207R, 195D (Note: A coalition of Progressive Republicans and Democrats elected a Progressive Republican, William Britton, as Speaker.)	Henry F. Hollis (D)	Jacob H. Gallinger (R)	Eugene E. Reed (D)	Raymond B. Stevens (D)	Woodrow Wilson/ Thomas R. Marshall (D) ✓
1914	Samuel D. Felker (D)	[?]	14D, 10R	207R, 195D	Henry F. Hollis (D)	Jacob H. Gallinger (R)	Eugene E. Reed (D)	Raymond B. Stevens (D)	Woodrow Wilson/ Thomas R. Marshall (D) ✓
1915	Rolland H. Spaulding (R)	[?]	19R, 4D, 1Prog	250R, 153D, 5Prog	Henry F. Hollis (D)	Jacob H. Gallinger (R)	Cyrus A. Sulloway (R)	Edward Hills Wason (R)	Woodrow Wilson/ Thomas R. Marshall (D) ✓
1916	Rolland H. Spaulding (R)	[?]	19R, 4D, 1Prog	250R, 153D, 5Prog	Henry F. Hollis (D)	Jacob H. Gallinger (R)	Cyrus A. Sulloway (R)	Edward Hills Wason (R)	Woodrow Wilson/ Thomas R. Marshall (D) ✓
1917	Henry W. Keyes (R)	[?]	16R, 8D	246R, 157D, 1I	Henry F. Hollis (D)	Jacob H. Gallinger (R)	Sherman Everett; Burroughs (R)	Edward Hills Wason (R)	Woodrow Wilson/ Thomas R. Marshall (D) ✓
1918	Henry W. Keyes (R)	[?]	16R, 8D	246R, 157D, 1I	Henry F. Hollis (D)	Irving W. Drew (R)	Sherman Everett; Burroughs (R)	Edward Hills Wason (R)	Woodrow Wilson/ Thomas R. Marshall (D) ✓
1919	John H. Bartlett (R)	[?]	19R, 5D	244R, 160D, 1ID, 1I	Henry W. Keyes (R)	George H. Moses (R)	Sherman Everett; Burroughs (R)	Edward Hills Wason (R)	Woodrow Wilson/ Thomas R. Marshall (D) ✓
1920	John H. Bartlett (R)	[?]	19R, 5D	244R, 160D, 1ID, 1I	Henry W. Keyes (R)	George H. Moses (R)	Sherman Everett; Burroughs (R)	Edward Hills Wason (R)	Warren G. Harding/ Calvin Coolidge (R) ✓
1921	Albert O. Brown (R)	[?]	21R, 3D	294R, 109D, 1I	Henry W. Keyes (R)	George H. Moses (R)	Sherman Everett; Burroughs (R)	Edward Hills Wason (R)	Warren G. Harding/ Calvin Coolidge (R) ✓
1922	Albert O. Brown (R)	[?]	21R, 3D	294R, 109D, 1I	Henry W. Keyes (R)	George H. Moses (R)	Sherman Everett; Burroughs (R)	Edward Hills Wason (R)	Warren G. Harding/ Calvin Coolidge (R) ✓
1923	Fred H. Brown (D)	[?]	16R, 8D	220D, 196R, 2I	Henry W. Keyes (R)	George H. Moses (R)	William N. Rogers (D)	Edward Hills Wason (R)	Warren G. Harding/ Calvin Coolidge (R) ✓
1924	Fred H. Brown (D)	[?]	16R, 8D	220D, 196R, 2I	Henry W. Keyes (R)	George H. Moses (R)	William N. Rogers (D)	Edward Hills Wason (R)	Calvin Coolidge/ Charles G. Dawes (R) ✓
1925	John Gilbert Winant (R)	[?]	19R, 5D	273R, 147D, 1I	Henry W. Keyes (R)	George H. Moses (R)	Fletcher Hale (R)	Edward Hills Wason (R)	Calvin Coolidge/ Charles G. Dawes (R) ✓
1926	John Gilbert Winant (R)	[?]	19R, 5D	273R, 147D, 1I	Henry W. Keyes (R)	George H. Moses (R)	Fletcher Hale (R)	Edward Hills Wason (R)	Calvin Coolidge/ Charles G. Dawes (R) ✓
1927	Huntley N. Spaulding (R)	[?]	20R, 4D	286R, 131D, 1I	Henry W. Keyes (R)	George H. Moses (R)	Fletcher Hale (R)	Edward Hills Wason (R)	Calvin Coolidge/ Charles G. Dawes (R) ✓
1928	Huntley N. Spaulding (R)	[?]	20R, 4D	286R, 131D, 1I	Henry W. Keyes (R)	George H. Moses (R)	Fletcher Hale (R)	Edward Hills Wason (R)	Herbert Hoover/ Charles Curtis (R) ✓
1929	Charles W. Tobey (R)	[?]	19R, 5D	273R, 148D	Henry W. Keyes (R)	George H. Moses (R)	Fletcher Hale (R)	Edward Hills Wason (R)	Herbert Hoover/ Charles Curtis (R) ✓
1930	Charles W. Tobey (R)	[?]	19R, 5D	273R, 148D	Henry W. Keyes (R)	George H. Moses (R)	Fletcher Hale (R)	Edward Hills Wason (R)	Herbert Hoover/ Charles Curtis (R) ✓
1931	John Gilbert Winant (R)	[?]	19R, 5D	254R, 163D	Henry W. Keyes (R)	George H. Moses (R)	Fletcher Hale (R)	Edward Hills Wason (R)	Herbert Hoover/ Charles Curtis (R) ✓
1932	John Gilbert Winant (R)	[?]	19R, 5D	254R, 163D	Henry W. Keyes (R)	George H. Moses (R)	William N. Rogers (D)	Edward Hills Wason (R)	Herbert Hoover/ Charles Curtis (R) ✗
1933	John Gilbert Winant (R)	[?]	16R, 8D	225R, 193D	Henry W. Keyes (R)	Fred H. Brown (D)	William N. Rogers (D)	Charles W. Tobey (R)	Herbert Hoover/ Charles Curtis (R) ✗
1934	John Gilbert Winant (R)	[?]	16R, 8D	225R, 193D	Henry W. Keyes (R)	Fred H. Brown (D)	William N. Rogers (D)	Charles W. Tobey (R)	Herbert Hoover/ Charles Curtis (R) ✗
1935	Styles Bridges (R)	[?]	15R, 9D	213R, 208D, 1I, 2 vac.	Henry W. Keyes (R)	Fred H. Brown (D)	William N. Rogers (D)	Charles W. Tobey (R)	Herbert Hoover/ Charles Curtis (R) ✗
1936	Styles Bridges (R)	[?]	15R, 9D	213R, 208D, 1I, 2 vac.	Henry W. Keyes (R)	Fred H. Brown (D)	William N. Rogers (D)	Charles W. Tobey (R)	Franklin D. Roosevelt/ John Nance Garner (D) ✓
1937	Francis P. Murphy (R)	[?]	16R, 8D	230R, 187D, 1I	Styles Bridges (R)	Fred H. Brown (D)	Arthur B. Jenks (R)	Charles W. Tobey (R)	Franklin D. Roosevelt/ John Nance Garner (D) ✓
1938	Francis P. Murphy (R)	[?]	16R, 8D	230R, 187D, 1I	Styles Bridges (R)	Fred H. Brown (D)	Alphonse Roy (D)	Charles W. Tobey (R)	Franklin D. Roosevelt/ John Nance Garner (D) ✓
1939	Francis P. Murphy (R)	[?]	18R, 6D	269R, 158D	Styles Bridges (R)	Charles W. Tobey (R)	Arthur B. Jenks (R)	Foster W. Stearns (R)	Franklin D. Roosevelt/ John Nance Garner (D) ✓
1940	Francis P. Murphy (R)	[?]	18R, 6D	269R, 158D	Styles Bridges (R)	Charles W. Tobey (R)	Arthur B. Jenks (R)	Foster W. Stearns (R)	Franklin D. Roosevelt/ Henry A. Wallace (D) ✓
1941	Robert O. Blood (R)	[?]	16R, 8D	229R, 194D	Styles Bridges (R)	Charles W. Tobey (R)	Arthur B. Jenks (R)	Foster W. Stearns (R)	Franklin D. Roosevelt/ Henry A. Wallace (D) ✓
1942	Robert O. Blood (R)	[?]	16R, 8D	229R, 194D	Styles Bridges (R)	Charles W. Tobey (R)	Arthur B. Jenks (R)	Foster W. Stearns (R)	Franklin D. Roosevelt/ Henry A. Wallace (D) ✓
1943	Robert O. Blood (R)	[?]	17R, 7D	276R, 167D	Styles Bridges (R)	Charles W. Tobey (R)	Chester E. Merrow (R)	Foster W. Stearns (R)	Franklin D. Roosevelt/ Henry A. Wallace (D) ✓
1944	Robert O. Blood (R)	[?]	17R, 7D	276R, 167D	Styles Bridges (R)	Charles W. Tobey (R)	Chester E. Merrow (R)	Foster W. Stearns (R)	Franklin D. Roosevelt/ Harry S. Truman (D) ✓
1945	Charles M. Dale (R)	[?]	15R, 9D	266R, 163D, 1I	Styles Bridges (R)	Charles W. Tobey (R)	Chester E. Merrow (R)	Sherman Adams (R)	Franklin D. Roosevelt/ Harry S. Truman (D) ✓
1946	Charles M. Dale (R)	[?]	15R, 9D	266R, 163D, 1I	Styles Bridges (R)	Charles W. Tobey (R)	Chester E. Merrow (R)	Sherman Adams (R)	Franklin D. Roosevelt/ Harry S. Truman (D) ✓
1947	Charles M. Dale (R)	[?]	19R, 5D	273R, 126D, 1I	Styles Bridges (R)	Charles W. Tobey (R)	Chester E. Merrow (R)	Norris Cotton (R)	Franklin D. Roosevelt/ Harry S. Truman (D) ✓
1948	Charles M. Dale (R)	[?]	19R, 5D	273R, 126D, 1I	Styles Bridges (R)	Charles W. Tobey (R)	Chester E. Merrow (R)	Norris Cotton (R)	Thomas E. Dewey/ Earl Warren (R) ✗
1949	Sherman Adams (R)	[?]	18R, 6D	254R, 145D	Styles Bridges (R)	Charles W. Tobey (R)	Chester E. Merrow (R)	Norris Cotton (R)	Thomas E. Dewey/ Earl Warren (R) ✗
1950	Sherman Adams (R)	[?]	18R, 6D	254R, 145D	Styles Bridges (R)	Charles W. Tobey (R)	Chester E. Merrow (R)	Norris Cotton (R)	Thomas E. Dewey/ Earl Warren (R) ✗
1951	Sherman Adams (R)	[?]	18R, 6D	263R, 133D, 3I	Styles Bridges (R)	Charles W. Tobey (R)	Chester E. Merrow (R)	Norris Cotton (R)	Thomas E. Dewey/ Earl Warren (R) ✗
1952	Sherman Adams (R)	[?]	18R, 6D	263R, 133D, 3I	Styles Bridges (R)	Charles W. Tobey (R)	Chester E. Merrow (R)	Norris Cotton (R)	Dwight D. Eisenhower/ Richard Nixon (R) ✓
1953	Hugh Gregg (R)	[?]	18R, 6D	276R, 122D, 1I	Styles Bridges (R)	Charles W. Tobey (R)	Chester E. Merrow (R)	Norris Cotton (R)	Dwight D. Eisenhower/ Richard Nixon (R) ✓
1954	Hugh Gregg (R)	[?]	18R, 6D	276R, 122D, 1I	Styles Bridges (R)	Robert W. Upton (R)	Chester E. Merrow (R)	Norris Cotton (R)	Dwight D. Eisenhower/ Richard Nixon (R) ✓
1955	Lane Dwinell (R)	[?]	18R, 6D	264R, 135D	Styles Bridges (R)	Norris Cotton (R)	Chester E. Merrow (R)	Perkins Bass (R)	Dwight D. Eisenhower/ Richard Nixon (R) ✓
1956	Lane Dwinell (R)	[?]	18R, 6D	264R, 135D	Styles Bridges (R)	Norris Cotton (R)	Chester E. Merrow (R)	Perkins Bass (R)	Dwight D. Eisenhower/ Richard Nixon (R) ✓
1957	Lane Dwinell (R)	[?]	18R, 6D	276R, 118D, 3I	Styles Bridges (R)	Norris Cotton (R)	Chester E. Merrow (R)	Perkins Bass (R)	Dwight D. Eisenhower/ Richard Nixon (R) ✓
1958	Lane Dwinell (R)	[?]	18R, 6D	276R, 118D, 3I	Styles Bridges (R)	Norris Cotton (R)	Chester E. Merrow (R)	Perkins Bass (R)	Dwight D. Eisenhower/ Richard Nixon (R) ✓
1959	Wesley Powell (R)	[?]	18R, 6D	264R, 136D	Styles Bridges (R)	Norris Cotton (R)	Chester E. Merrow (R)	Perkins Bass (R)	Dwight D. Eisenhower/ Richard Nixon (R) ✓
1960	Wesley Powell (R)	[?]	18R, 6D	264R, 136D	Styles Bridges (R)	Norris Cotton (R)	Chester E. Merrow (R)	Perkins Bass (R)	Richard Nixon/ Henry Cabot Lodge Jr. (R) ✗
1961	Wesley Powell (R)	[?]	18R, 6D	259R, 139D, 1I	Styles Bridges (R)	Norris Cotton (R)	Chester E. Merrow (R)	Perkins Bass (R)	Richard Nixon/ Henry Cabot Lodge Jr. (R) ✗
1962	Wesley Powell (R)	[?]	18R, 6D	259R, 139D, 1I	Maurice J. Murphy Jr. (R)	Norris Cotton (R)	Chester E. Merrow (R)	Perkins Bass (R)	Richard Nixon/ Henry Cabot Lodge Jr. (R) ✗
1963	John W. King (D)	4R, 1D	19R, 5D	253R, 146D	Thomas J. McIntyre (D)	Norris Cotton (R)	Louis C. Wyman (R)	James Colgate; Cleveland (R)	Richard Nixon/ Henry Cabot Lodge Jr. (R) ✗
1964	John W. King (D)	4R, 1D	19R, 5D	253R, 146D	Thomas J. McIntyre (D)	Norris Cotton (R)	Louis C. Wyman (R)	James Colgate; Cleveland (R)	Lyndon B. Johnson/ Hubert Humphrey (D) ✓
1965	John W. King (D)	4D, 1R	14R, 10D	216R, 183D	Thomas J. McIntyre (D)	Norris Cotton (R)	J. Oliva Huot (D)	James Colgate; Cleveland (R)	Lyndon B. Johnson/ Hubert Humphrey (D) ✓
1966	John W. King (D)	4D, 1R	14R, 10D	216R, 183D	Thomas J. McIntyre (D)	Norris Cotton (R)	J. Oliva Huot (D)	James Colgate; Cleveland (R)	Lyndon B. Johnson/ Hubert Humphrey (D) ✓
1967	John W. King (D)	4R, 1D	14R, 10D	245R, 155D	Thomas J. McIntyre (D)	Norris Cotton (R)	Louis C. Wyman (R)	James Colgate; Cleveland (R)	Lyndon B. Johnson/ Hubert Humphrey (D) ✓
1968	John W. King (D)	4R, 1D	14R, 10D	245R, 155D	Thomas J. McIntyre (D)	Norris Cotton (R)	Louis C. Wyman (R)	James Colgate; Cleveland (R)	Richard Nixon/ Spiro Agnew (R) ✓
1969	Walter R. Peterson Jr. (R)	5R	15R, 9D	255R, 145D	Thomas J. McIntyre (D)	Norris Cotton (R)	Louis C. Wyman (R)	James Colgate; Cleveland (R)	Richard Nixon/ Spiro Agnew (R) ✓
1970	Walter R. Peterson Jr. (R)	5R	15R, 9D	255R, 145D	Thomas J. McIntyre (D)	Norris Cotton (R)	Louis C. Wyman (R)	James Colgate; Cleveland (R)	Richard Nixon/ Spiro Agnew (R) ✓
1971	Walter R. Peterson Jr. (R)	4R, 1D	15R, 9D	253R, 147D	Thomas J. McIntyre (D)	Norris Cotton (R)	Louis C. Wyman (R)	James Colgate; Cleveland (R)	Richard Nixon/ Spiro Agnew (R) ✓
1972	Walter R. Peterson Jr. (R)	4R, 1D	15R, 9D	253R, 147D	Thomas J. McIntyre (D)	Norris Cotton (R)	Louis C. Wyman (R)	James Colgate; Cleveland (R)	Richard Nixon/ Spiro Agnew (R) ✓
1973	Meldrim Thomson (R)	5R	14R, 10D	263R, 137D	Thomas J. McIntyre (D)	Norris Cotton (R)	Louis C. Wyman (R)	James Colgate; Cleveland (R)	Richard Nixon/ Spiro Agnew (R) ✓
1974	Meldrim Thomson (R)	5R	14R, 10D	263R, 137D	Thomas J. McIntyre (D)	Norris Cotton (R)	Louis C. Wyman (R)	James Colgate; Cleveland (R)	Richard Nixon/ Spiro Agnew (R) ✓
1975	Meldrim Thomson (R)	5R	13R, 11D	234R, 166D	Thomas J. McIntyre (D)	Louis C. Wyman (R) (Note: After having apparently won election to the Senate, Wyman was appointed to serve out the last 4 days of retiring Senator Norris Cotton's term. However, Durkin contested the election results in the Senate, which resulted in the seat being vacant for seven months until an agreement to hold a new special election between Wyman and Durkin. Cotton was reappointed to his old seat in the meantime (from August 8 to September 18), and Durkin, having emerged victorious in the special election was finally seated on September 18.)	Norman D'Amours (D)	James Colgate; Cleveland (R)	Richard Nixon/ Spiro Agnew (R) ✓
1975	Meldrim Thomson (R)	5R	13R, 11D	234R, 166D	Thomas J. McIntyre (D)	vacant	Norman D'Amours (D)	James Colgate; Cleveland (R)	Richard Nixon/ Spiro Agnew (R) ✓
1975	Meldrim Thomson (R)	5R	13R, 11D	234R, 166D	Thomas J. McIntyre (D)	Norris Cotton (R)	Norman D'Amours (D)	James Colgate; Cleveland (R)	Richard Nixon/ Spiro Agnew (R) ✓
1976	Meldrim Thomson (R)	5R	13R, 11D	234R, 166D	Thomas J. McIntyre (D)	John A. Durkin (D)	Norman D'Amours (D)	James Colgate; Cleveland (R)	Gerald Ford/ Bob Dole (R) ✗
1977	Meldrim Thomson (R)	4R, 1D	12R, 12D (Note: Republican Senate Presidents, first Alf E. Jacobson, then Robert B. Monier, were chosen in 1977 and 1979.)	220R, 180D	Thomas J. McIntyre (D)	John A. Durkin (D)	Norman D'Amours (D)	James Colgate; Cleveland (R)	Gerald Ford/ Bob Dole (R) ✗
1978	Meldrim Thomson (R)	4R, 1D	12R, 12D	220R, 180D	Thomas J. McIntyre (D)	John A. Durkin (D)	Norman D'Amours (D)	James Colgate; Cleveland (R)	Gerald Ford/ Bob Dole (R) ✗
1979	Hugh Gallen (D) (Note: Fell ill and yielded his powers to the president of the state Senate; died on December 29, 1982.)	4R, 1D	12R, 12D	225R, 175D	Gordon J. Humphrey (R)	John A. Durkin (D)	Norman D'Amours (D)	James Colgate; Cleveland (R)	Gerald Ford/ Bob Dole (R) ✗
1980	Hugh Gallen (D)	4R, 1D	12R, 12D	225R, 175D	Gordon J. Humphrey (R)	John A. Durkin (D)	Norman D'Amours (D)	James Colgate; Cleveland (R)	Ronald Reagan/ George H. W. Bush (R) ✓
1981	Hugh Gallen (D)	4R, 1D	14R, 10D	240R, 160D	Gordon J. Humphrey (R)	Warren Rudman (R)	Norman D'Amours (D)	Judd Gregg (R)	Ronald Reagan/ George H. W. Bush (R) ✓
1982	Vesta M. Roy (R)	4R, 1D	14R, 10D	240R, 160D	Gordon J. Humphrey (R)	Warren Rudman (R)	Norman D'Amours (D)	Judd Gregg (R)	Ronald Reagan/ George H. W. Bush (R) ✓
1983	John H. Sununu (R)	4R, 1D	15R, 9D	242R, 158D	Gordon J. Humphrey (R)	Warren Rudman (R)	Norman D'Amours (D)	Judd Gregg (R)	Ronald Reagan/ George H. W. Bush (R) ✓
1984	John H. Sununu (R)	4R, 1D	15R, 9D	242R, 158D	Gordon J. Humphrey (R)	Warren Rudman (R)	Norman D'Amours (D)	Judd Gregg (R)	Ronald Reagan/ George H. W. Bush (R) ✓
1985	John H. Sununu (R)	5R	18R, 6D	298R, 102D	Gordon J. Humphrey (R)	Warren Rudman (R)	Bob Smith (R)	Judd Gregg (R)	Ronald Reagan/ George H. W. Bush (R) ✓
1986	John H. Sununu (R)	5R	18R, 6D	298R, 102D	Gordon J. Humphrey (R)	Warren Rudman (R)	Bob Smith (R)	Judd Gregg (R)	Ronald Reagan/ George H. W. Bush (R) ✓
1987	John H. Sununu (R)	5R	16R, 8D	267R, 133D	Gordon J. Humphrey (R)	Warren Rudman (R)	Bob Smith (R)	Judd Gregg (R)	Ronald Reagan/ George H. W. Bush (R) ✓
1988	John H. Sununu (R)	5R	16R, 8D	267R, 133D	Gordon J. Humphrey (R)	Warren Rudman (R)	Bob Smith (R)	Judd Gregg (R)	George H. W. Bush/ Dan Quayle (R) ✓
1989	Judd Gregg (R)	5R	16R, 8D	282R, 118D	Gordon J. Humphrey (R)	Warren Rudman (R)	Bob Smith (R)	Chuck Douglas (R)	George H. W. Bush/ Dan Quayle (R) ✓
1990	Judd Gregg (R)	5R	16R, 8D	282R, 118D	Gordon J. Humphrey (R)	Warren Rudman (R)	Bob Smith (R)	Chuck Douglas (R)	George H. W. Bush/ Dan Quayle (R) ✓
1991	Judd Gregg (R)	5R	13R, 11D	271R, 129D	Bob Smith (R)	Warren Rudman (R)	Bill Zeliff (R)	Richard N. Swett (D)	George H. W. Bush/ Dan Quayle (R) ✓
1992	Judd Gregg (R)	5R	13R, 11D	271R, 129D	Bob Smith (R)	Warren Rudman (R)	Bill Zeliff (R)	Richard N. Swett (D)	Bill Clinton/ Al Gore (D) ✓
1993	Steve Merrill (R)	5R	13R, 11D	256R, 140D, 4L	Bob Smith (R)	Judd Gregg (R)	Bill Zeliff (R)	Richard N. Swett (D)	Bill Clinton/ Al Gore (D) ✓
1994	Steve Merrill (R)	5R	13R, 11D	256R, 140D, 4L	Bob Smith (R)	Judd Gregg (R)	Bill Zeliff (R)	Richard N. Swett (D)	Bill Clinton/ Al Gore (D) ✓
1995	Steve Merrill (R)	5R	18R, 6D	290R, 110D	Bob Smith (R)	Judd Gregg (R)	Bill Zeliff (R)	Charles Bass (R)	Bill Clinton/ Al Gore (D) ✓
1996	Steve Merrill (R)	5R	18R, 6D	290R, 110D	Bob Smith (R)	Judd Gregg (R)	Bill Zeliff (R)	Charles Bass (R)	Bill Clinton/ Al Gore (D) ✓
1997	Jeanne Shaheen (D)	4R, 1D	15R, 9D	254R, 146D	Bob Smith (R)	Judd Gregg (R)	John E. Sununu (R)	Charles Bass (R)	Bill Clinton/ Al Gore (D) ✓
1998	Jeanne Shaheen (D)	4R, 1D	15R, 9D	254R, 146D	Bob Smith (R)	Judd Gregg (R)	John E. Sununu (R)	Charles Bass (R)	Bill Clinton/ Al Gore (D) ✓
1999	Jeanne Shaheen (D)	5R	13D, 11R	245R, 155D	Bob Smith (R)	Judd Gregg (R)	John E. Sununu (R)	Charles Bass (R)	Bill Clinton/ Al Gore (D) ✓
2000	Jeanne Shaheen (D)	5R	12D, 12R (Note: In summer 1999 a Democratic senator died and was succeeded by a Republican elected in a special election.)	245R, 155D	Bob Smith (R)	Judd Gregg (R)	John E. Sununu (R)	Charles Bass (R)	George W. Bush/ Dick Cheney (R) ✓
2001	Jeanne Shaheen (D)	5R	13R, 11D	256R, 144D	Bob Smith (R)	Judd Gregg (R)	John E. Sununu (R)	Charles Bass (R)	George W. Bush/ Dick Cheney (R) ✓
2002	Jeanne Shaheen (D)	5R	13R, 11D	256R, 144D	Bob Smith (R)	Judd Gregg (R)	John E. Sununu (R)	Charles Bass (R)	George W. Bush/ Dick Cheney (R) ✓
2003	Craig Benson (R)	5R	18R, 6D	278R, 122D	John E. Sununu (R)	Judd Gregg (R)	Jeb Bradley (R)	Charles Bass (R)	George W. Bush/ Dick Cheney (R) ✓
2004	Craig Benson (R)	5R	18R, 6D	278R, 122D	John E. Sununu (R)	Judd Gregg (R)	Jeb Bradley (R)	Charles Bass (R)	John Kerry/ John Edwards (D) ✗
2005	John Lynch (D)	4R, 1D	16R, 8D	249R, 151D	John E. Sununu (R)	Judd Gregg (R)	Jeb Bradley (R)	Charles Bass (R)	John Kerry/ John Edwards (D) ✗
2006	John Lynch (D)	4R, 1D	16R, 8D	249R, 151D	John E. Sununu (R)	Judd Gregg (R)	Jeb Bradley (R)	Charles Bass (R)	John Kerry/ John Edwards (D) ✗
2007	John Lynch (D)	3D, 2R	14D, 10R	239D, 160R, 1I	John E. Sununu (R)	Judd Gregg (R)	Carol Shea-Porter (D)	Paul Hodes (D)	John Kerry/ John Edwards (D) ✗
2008	John Lynch (D)	3D, 2R	14D, 10R	239D, 160R, 1I	John E. Sununu (R)	Judd Gregg (R)	Carol Shea-Porter (D)	Paul Hodes (D)	Barack Obama/ Joe Biden (D) ✓
2009	John Lynch (D)	3D, 2R	14D, 10R	225D, 175R	Jeanne Shaheen (D)	Judd Gregg (R)	Carol Shea-Porter (D)	Paul Hodes (D)	Barack Obama/ Joe Biden (D) ✓
2010	John Lynch (D)	3D, 2R	14D, 10R	224D, 176R	Jeanne Shaheen (D)	Judd Gregg (R)	Carol Shea-Porter (D)	Paul Hodes (D)	Barack Obama/ Joe Biden (D) ✓
2011	John Lynch (D)	5R	19R, 5D	298R, 102D	Jeanne Shaheen (D)	Kelly Ayotte (R)	Frank Guinta (R)	Charles Bass (R)	Barack Obama/ Joe Biden (D) ✓
2012	John Lynch (D)	5R	19R, 5D	295R, 105D (Note: Democrats flipped three seats from the Republicans in 2011 special elections)	Jeanne Shaheen (D)	Kelly Ayotte (R)	Frank Guinta (R)	Charles Bass (R)	Barack Obama/ Joe Biden (D) ✓
2013	Maggie Hassan (D)	3D, 2R	13R, 11D	221D, 179R	Jeanne Shaheen (D)	Kelly Ayotte (R)	Carol Shea-Porter(D)	Annie Kuster (D)	Barack Obama/ Joe Biden (D) ✓
2014	Maggie Hassan (D)	3D, 2R	13R, 11D	221D, 179R	Jeanne Shaheen (D)	Kelly Ayotte (R)	Carol Shea-Porter(D)	Annie Kuster (D)	Barack Obama/ Joe Biden (D) ✓
2015	Maggie Hassan (D)	3R, 2D	14R, 10D	239R, 160D, 1I	Jeanne Shaheen (D)	Kelly Ayotte (R)	Frank Guinta (R)	Annie Kuster (D)	Barack Obama/ Joe Biden (D) ✓
2016	Maggie Hassan (D)	3R, 2D	14R, 10D	239R, 160D, 1I	Jeanne Shaheen (D)	Kelly Ayotte (R)	Frank Guinta (R)	Annie Kuster (D)	Hillary Clinton/ Tim Kaine (D) ✗
2017	Chris Sununu (R)	3R, 2D	14R, 10D	217R, 176D, 3L	Jeanne Shaheen (D)	Maggie Hassan (D)	Carol Shea-Porter (D)	Annie Kuster (D)	Hillary Clinton/ Tim Kaine (D) ✗
2018	Chris Sununu (R)	3R, 2D	14R, 10D	217R, 176D, 3L	Jeanne Shaheen (D)	Maggie Hassan (D)	Carol Shea-Porter (D)	Annie Kuster (D)	Hillary Clinton/ Tim Kaine (D) ✗
2019	Chris Sununu (R)	3D, 2R	14D, 10R	234D, 166R	Jeanne Shaheen (D)	Maggie Hassan (D)	Chris Pappas (D)	Annie Kuster (D)	Hillary Clinton/ Tim Kaine (D) ✗
2020	Chris Sununu (R)	3D, 2R	14D, 10R	234D, 166R	Jeanne Shaheen (D)	Maggie Hassan (D)	Chris Pappas (D)	Annie Kuster (D)	Joe Biden/ Kamala Harris (D) ✓
2021	Chris Sununu (R)	4R, 1D	14R, 10D	213R, 187D	Jeanne Shaheen (D)	Maggie Hassan (D)	Chris Pappas (D)	Annie Kuster (D)	Joe Biden/ Kamala Harris (D) ✓
2022	Chris Sununu (R)	4R, 1D	14R, 10D	211R, 188D, 1I	Jeanne Shaheen (D)	Maggie Hassan (D)	Chris Pappas (D)	Annie Kuster (D)	Joe Biden/ Kamala Harris (D) ✓
2023	Chris Sununu (R)	4R, 1D	14R, 10D	201R, 199D	Jeanne Shaheen (D)	Maggie Hassan (D)	Chris Pappas (D)	Annie Kuster (D)	Joe Biden/ Kamala Harris (D) ✓
2024	Chris Sununu (R)	4R, 1D	14R, 10D	201R, 196D, 3I	Jeanne Shaheen (D)	Maggie Hassan (D)	Chris Pappas (D)	Annie Kuster (D)	Kamala Harris/ Tim Walz (D) ✗
2025	Kelly Ayotte (R)	4R, 1D	16R, 8D	222R, 178D	Jeanne Shaheen (D)	Maggie Hassan (D)	Chris Pappas (D)	Maggie Goodlander (D)	Kamala Harris/ Tim Walz (D) ✗
2026	Kelly Ayotte (R)	4R, 1D	16R, 8D	222R, 178D	Jeanne Shaheen (D)	Maggie Hassan (D)	Chris Pappas (D)	Maggie Goodlander (D)	Kamala Harris/ Tim Walz (D) ✗
2027	Kelly Ayotte (R)	5D	15D, 9R	292D, 107R	Chris Pappas (D)	Maggie Hassan (D)	Stefany Shaheen (D)	Maggie Goodlander (D)	Kamala Harris/ Tim Walz (D) ✗

Key to party colors and abbreviations for members of the U.S. Congress and other politicians or officials
Alaskan Independence (AKIP) Know Nothing (KN) American Labor (AL) Anti-Jacksonian (Anti-J); National Republican (NR) Anti-Administration (AA) Anti-Masonic (Anti-M) Conservative (Con) Covenant (Cov)	Democratic (D) Democratic–Farmer–Labor (DFL) Democratic–NPL (D-NPL) Dixiecrat (Dix), States' Rights (SR) Democratic-Republican (DR) Farmer–Labor (FL) Federalist (F); Pro-Administration (PA)	Free Soil (FS) Fusion (Fus) Greenback (GB) Independence (IPM) Jacksonian (J) Liberal (Lib) Libertarian (L) National Union (NU)	Nonpartisan League (NPL) Nullifier (N) Opposition Northern (O); Opposition Southern (O) Populist (Pop) Progressive (Prog) Prohibition (Proh) Readjuster (Rea)	Republican (R) Silver (Sv) Silver Republican (SvR) Socialist (Soc) Union (U) Unconditional Union (UU) Vermont Progressive (VP) Whig (W)	Independent (I) Nonpartisan (NP)

== See also ==
- Politics in New Hampshire
- Politics of New Hampshire
- Elections in New Hampshire
- List of New Hampshire General Courts
