= 1871 New Hampshire gubernatorial election =

- March 14, 1871
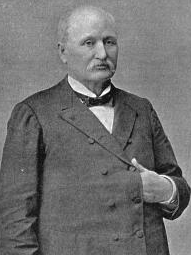

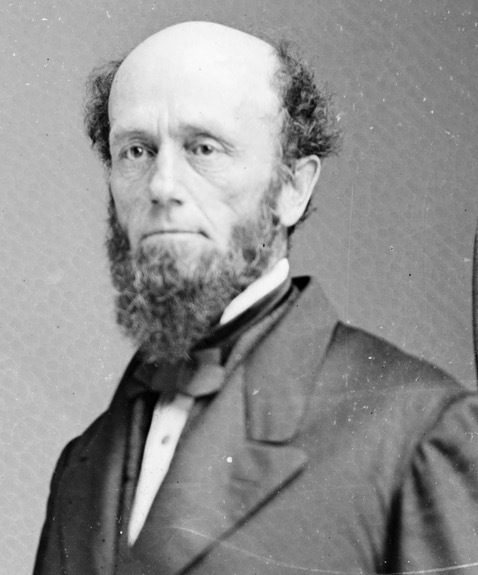
| Nominee | James A. Weston | James Pike |
| Party | Democratic | Republican |
| Popular vote | 34,700 | 33,892 |
| Percentage | 49.76% | 48.61% |
- County results Weston: 50–60% Pike: 40–50% 50–60%
Governor before election
Onslow Stearns
Republican
Elected Governor
James A. Weston
Democratic

The 1871 New Hampshire gubernatorial election was held on March 14, 1871, in order to elect the Governor of New Hampshire. Democratic nominee and incumbent Mayor of Manchester James A. Weston defeated Republican nominee and former member of the U.S. House of Representatives from New Hampshire's 1st district James Pike, Temperance nominee Albert Comings and Labor Reform Party nominee Lemuel P. Cooper.

== General election ==
On election day, March 14, 1871, Democratic nominee James A. Weston won the election by a margin of 808 votes against his foremost opponent Republican nominee James Pike, thereby gaining Democratic control over the office of Governor. Weston was sworn in as the 33rd Governor of New Hampshire on June 14, 1871.

=== Results ===
New Hampshire gubernatorial election, 1871
| Party | Candidate | Votes | % |
|---|---|---|---|
| Democratic | James A. Weston | 34,700 | 49.76 |
| Republican | James Pike | 33,892 | 48.61 |
| Prohibition | Albert Comings | 782 | 1.12 |
| Labor Reform Party | Lemuel P. Cooper | 314 | 0.45 |
| | Scattering | 41 | 0.06 |
| Total votes | | 69,729 | 100.00 |
| Democratic gain from Republican | | | |
