= Charles H. Bell (politician) =

American politician (1823–1893)

Charles Henry Bell
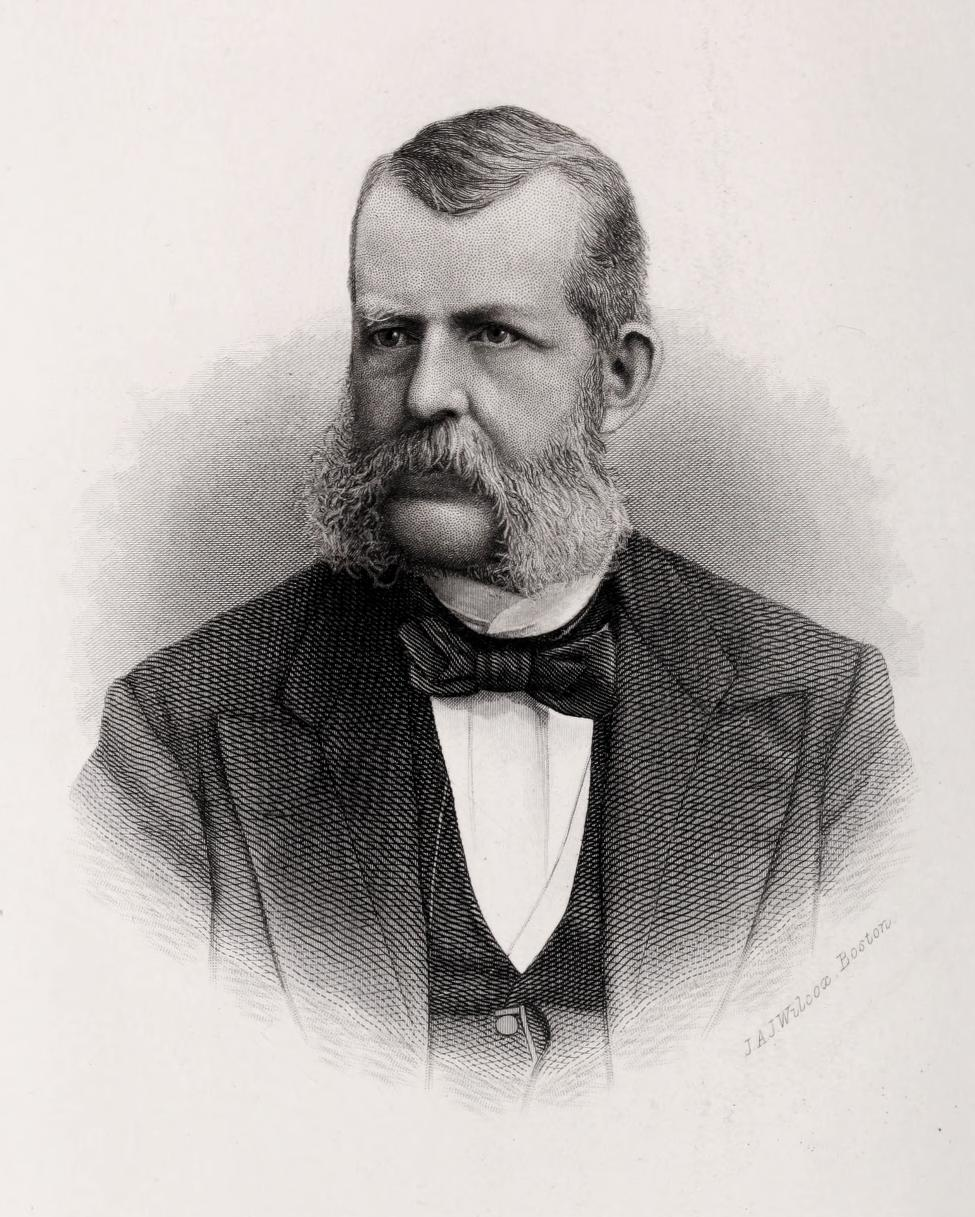

United States Senator from New Hampshire
- In office March 13, 1879 – June 18, 1879
- Appointed by: Benjamin F. Prescott
- Preceded by: Bainbridge Wadleigh
- Succeeded by: Henry W. Blair

38th Governor of New Hampshire
- In office June 2, 1881 – June 7, 1883
- Preceded by: Nathaniel Head
- Succeeded by: Samuel W. Hale

President of the New Hampshire Senate
- In office 1864–1864
- Preceded by: Onslow Stearns
- Succeeded by: Ezekiel A. Straw

Member of the New Hampshire Senate

Speaker of the New Hampshire House of Representatives
- In office 1860–1860
- Preceded by: Napoleon B. Bryant
- Succeeded by: Edward A. Rollins

Personal details
- Born: November 18, 1823 Chester, New Hampshire, U.S.
- Died: November 11, 1893 (aged 69) Exeter, New Hampshire, U.S.
- Resting place: Exeter Cemetery
- Party: Republican
- Spouse(s): Sarah Almira Gilman, Helen A. (Williams)

Charles Henry Bell (November 18, 1823 – November 11, 1893) was an American lawyer and Republican politician from Exeter, New Hampshire. Bell served New Hampshire in both the New Hampshire House of Representatives and the New Hampshire Senate, as a U.S. senator, and as the 38th governor of New Hampshire.

== Early life ==
Charles H. Bell was born on November 18, 1823, in Chester, New Hampshire, one of the ten children of Governor John Bell. He was also the nephew of Samuel Bell, first cousin of James Bell and the first cousin, once removed of Samuel Newell Bell.

== Service in the New Hampshire General Court ==
Bell's career in the New Hampshire General Court was notable in that he held two unique offices. In 1860 Bell was the Speaker of the New Hampshire House of Representatives. and President of the New Hampshire Senate in 1864.

== Writings ==
Bell was the author of an influential early history of Exeter, New Hampshire, as well as a number of other books. His first wife was Sarah Almira Gilman, daughter of Nicholas Gilman; his second wife Helen A. (Williams) daughter of Reuel Williams of Portland, ME, and widow of John Taylor Gilman of Exeter. Both wives were descendants of Edward Gilman Sr., an early Exeter settler who had previously lived in Hingham, Massachusetts, and Ipswich, Massachusetts.

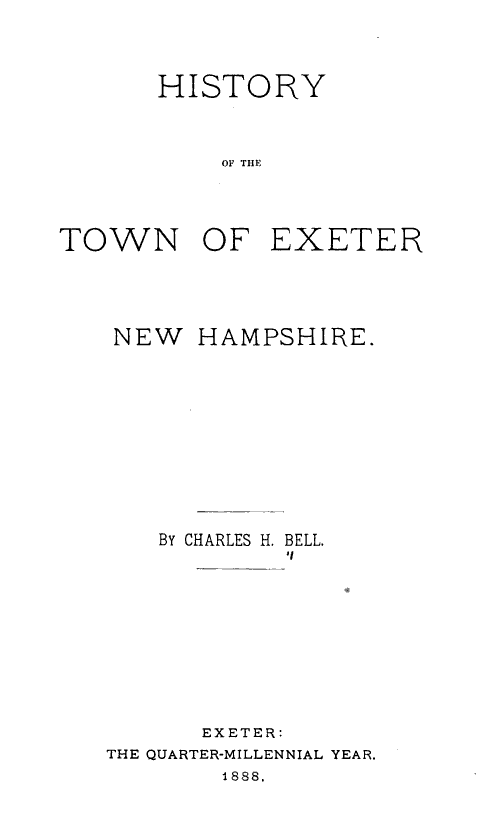
Frontispiece, History of the Town of Exeter, New Hampshire, Charles H. Bell, 1888

== Honors ==
Bell was elected a member of the American Antiquarian Society in 1868.

== Death and burial ==
Charles Bell died on November 11, 1893 (one week shy of his 70th birthday) in Exeter, New Hampshire, and is buried at the Exeter Cemetery in that town.

== Footnotes ==
Party political offices
Preceded by Nathaniel Head	Republican nominee for Governor of New Hampshire; 1880	Succeeded by Samuel W. Hale
U.S. Senate
Preceded by Bainbridge Wadleigh	U.S. senator (Class 3) from New Hampshire; 1879; Served alongside: Edward H. Rollins	Succeeded by Henry W. Blair
Political offices
Preceded by Natt Head	Governor of New Hampshire; 1881–1883	Succeeded by Samuel W. Hale
Preceded by Onslow Stearns	President of the New Hampshire Senate; 1864–1864	Succeeded by Ezekiel A. Straw
Preceded by Napoleon B. Bryant	Speaker of the New Hampshire House of Representatives; 1860–1860	Succeeded by Edward A. Rollins
