= Bainbridge Wadleigh =

American politician (1831–1891)

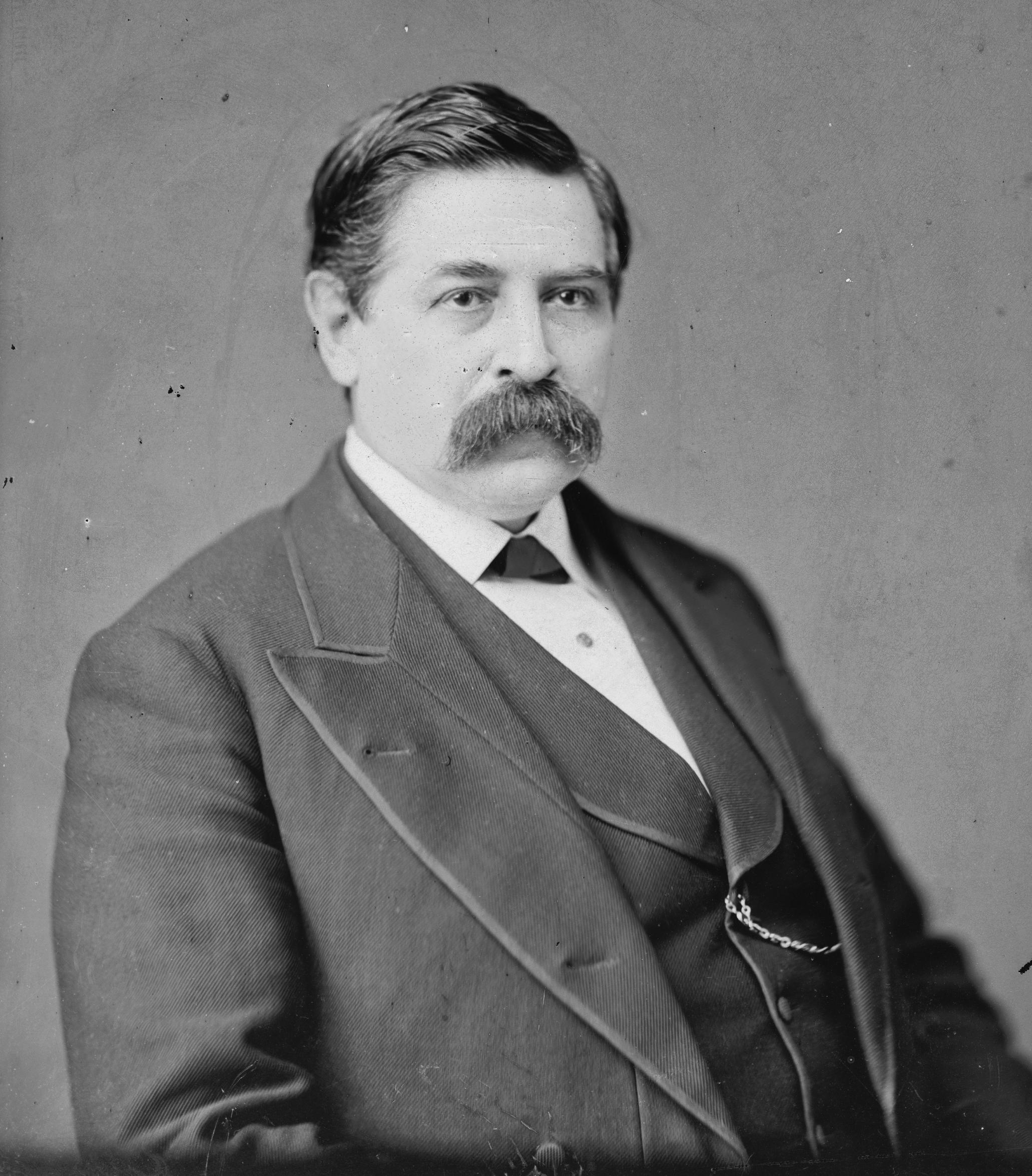

United States Senator from New Hampshire
- In office March 4, 1873 – March 3, 1879
- Preceded by: James W. Patterson
- Succeeded by: Charles H. Bell

Member of the New Hampshire House of Representatives
- In office 1855–1856; 1859–1860; 1869–1872

Personal details
- Born: January 4, 1831 Bradford, New Hampshire, U.S.
- Died: January 24, 1891 (aged 60) Boston, Massachusetts, U.S.
- Party: Republican

Bainbridge Wadleigh (January 4, 1831 – January 24, 1891) was a United States senator from New Hampshire. Born in Bradford, he attended the common schools and Kimball Union Academy (Meriden, New Hampshire). He studied law, was admitted to the bar in 1850 and commenced practice in Milford. Wadleigh served six terms as town moderator and was a member of the New Hampshire House of Representatives in 1855-1856, 1859-1860, and from 1869 to 1872.

== United States Senate ==
Wadleigh was nominated to the U.S. Senate on the evening of June 13, 1872 by the Republican party caucus of the New Hampshire legislature, on its fifth ballot. He received the nomination instead of the incumbent Senator James W. Patterson, who had led on the first three caucus ballots. Wadleigh had not sought the office, and received 3 votes on the first ballot. In the succeeding second through fourth ballots, he received 8, 18, and 39 votes respectively. On the fifth ballot Wadleigh received 152 votes, and 58 were received by all others. The other individuals on the fifth ballot were Edward H. Rollins (former congressman and future U.S. senator), Onslow Stearns (the recent governor), Mason W. Tappan (former congressman and later New Hampshire Attorney General), and Gilman Marston (former congressman). Elected by the New Hampshire legislature to the U.S. Senate, he served from March 4, 1873, to March 3, 1879.

Charles H. Bell was Wadleigh's immediate successor, and had been appointed to fill the Senate seat for several months, until the most recently elected New Hampshire legislature could convene. Wadleigh attempted to obtain the nomination from the New Hampshire Republican legislative caucus, but Henry W. Blair received the nomination after several ballots, and was later elected to the Senate by the legislature, in 1879.

While in the Senate he was chairman of the Committee on Patents (Forty-fourth and Forty-fifth Congresses) and a member of the Committee on Privileges and Elections (Forty-fifth Congress).

He resumed the practice of law in Boston, where he died in 1891; interment was in West Street Cemetery, Milford.

== Family ==
Wadleigh married Ann M. (Putnam) Wadleigh, who died in 1879. Their first daughter Helen Putnam Wadleigh (1859-1931) married Samuel Hoar IV (1847-1904), son of United States Attorney General Ebenezer R. Hoar. Their second daughter, Caroline (1861-1931), married Washington B. Thomas (1857-1929), who rose to be the chairman of the American Sugar Refining Company.

== Notes ==
U.S. Senate
Preceded by James W. Patterson	U.S. senator (Class 3) from New Hampshire; 1873–1879; Served alongside: Aaron H. Cragin, Edward H. Rollins	Succeeded by Charles H. Bell
