= Thomas M. Edwards =

American politician (1795–1875)

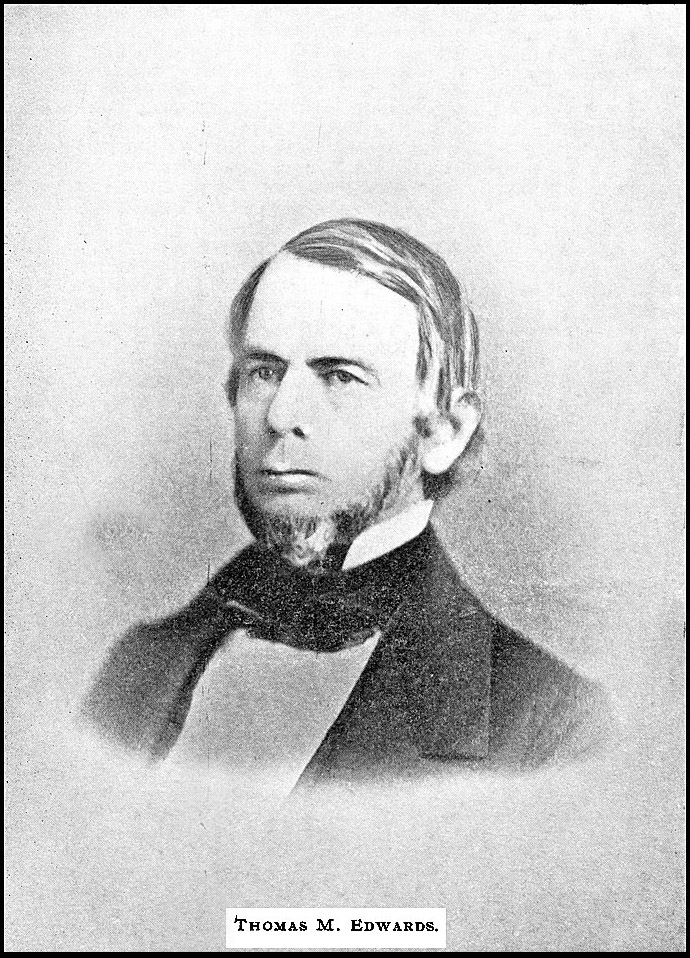

Member of the U.S. House of Representatives from New Hampshire's 3rd district
- In office March 4, 1859 – March 3, 1863
- Preceded by: Nehemiah Eastman
- Succeeded by: Jacob Hart Ela

Member of the New Hampshire House of Representatives
- In office 1834; 1836; 1838; 1839

Personal details
- Born: December 16, 1795 Keene, Cheshire County; New Hampshire, USA
- Died: May 1, 1875 (aged 79) Keene, Cheshire County; New Hampshire, USA
- Resting place: Woodland Cemetery; Keene, Cheshire County; New Hampshire, USA
- Education: Dartmouth College
- Occupation: Lawyer; Railroad President; Bank President; Insurance President

Thomas McKey Edwards (December 16, 1795 – May 1, 1875) was an American politician and a U.S. Representative from New Hampshire.

== Early life ==
Born in Keene, New Hampshire, Edwards was tutored privately. He was graduated from Dartmouth College, Hanover, in 1813. He studied law and was admitted to the bar in 1817, commencing practice in Keene, New Hampshire.

== Career ==
Edwards served as Postmaster of Keene from June 30, 1818, to July 23, 1829. He was in the New Hampshire House of Representatives in 1834, 1836, 1838, and 1839. In 1845, he abandoned his law practice and superintended the construction of the [Cheshire Railroad, serving as its first president. He served as president of the Ashuelot National Bank from 1853 until elected to Congress in 1859, when he resigned. In 1869 he was again chosen, and held the office until his death in 1875. He was also president of the Ashuelot Mutual Fire Insurance Company.

In 1859 Edwards was elected as a Republican to the Thirty-sixth and Thirty-seventh Congresses and served as United States Representative for the 3rd congressional district of the state of New Hampshire (March 4, 1859 – March 3, 1863). He was not a candidate for renomination in 1862 to the Thirty-eighth Congress. He resumed his former business pursuits in Keene.

== Death ==
Edwards died in Keene, Cheshire County, New Hampshire, on May 1, 1875 (age 79 years, 136 days). He is interred at Woodland Cemetery, Keene, New Hampshire.

U.S. House of Representatives
Preceded by Aaron H. Cragin	U.S. Representative for the 3rd congressional district of New Hampshire; March 4, 1859–March 3, 1863	Succeeded by James W. Patterson
