= Ezekiel A. Straw =

American politician

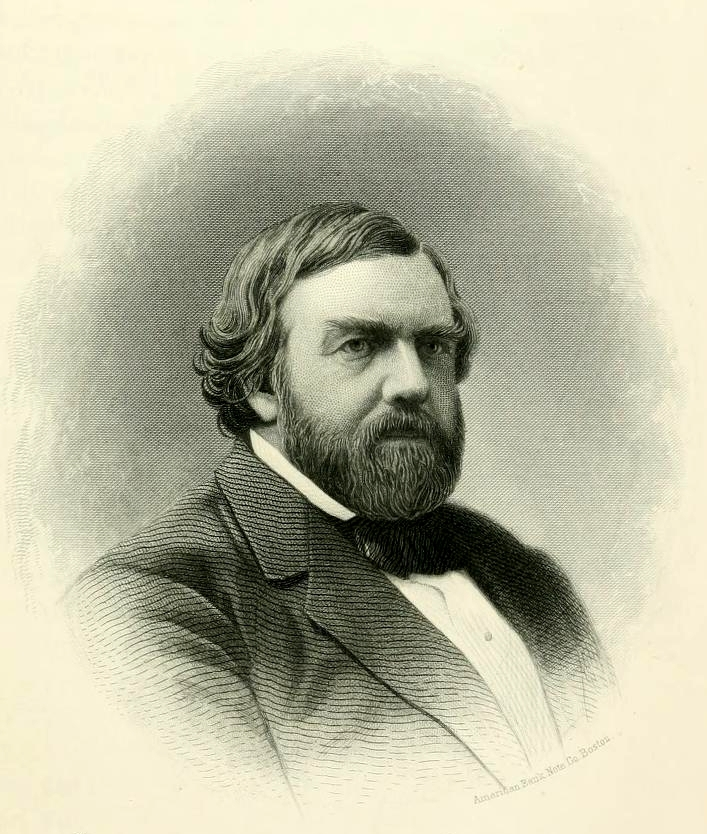
- Ezekiel A. Straw in 1875

34th Governor of New Hampshire
- In office June 6, 1872 – June 3, 1874
- Preceded by: James A. Weston
- Succeeded by: James A. Weston

Member of the New Hampshire Senate
- In office 1864-1866

Member of the New Hampshire House of Representatives
- In office 1859-1864

Personal details
- Born: December 30, 1819 Salisbury, New Hampshire
- Died: October 23, 1882 (aged 62) Manchester, New Hampshire

Ezekiel Albert Straw (December 30, 1819 – October 23, 1882) was an American engineer, businessman, and politician from Manchester, New Hampshire. He was born in Salisbury, but moved with his family to Lowell, Massachusetts, where his father, James B. Straw, was employed at the Appleton Manufacturing Company. Ezekiel A. Straw, eldest of 7 children. A member of the first class of Lowell High School in 1831 before enrolling at Phillips Andover Academy in Andover, where he showed an aptitude for mathematics.

Upon leaving Phillips Andover, Straw was hired in the spring of 1838 as an assistant civil engineer at the Nashua & Lowell Railway, then under construction. On July 4, 1838, he arrived in Manchester, New Hampshire, sent to substitute for a civil engineer at the Amoskeag Manufacturing Company who had become ill. The position soon became permanent. One of his first duties was laying out lots and streets for the new industrial city as envisioned by Amoskeag's cultured treasurer (president), William Amory. He also assisted with the construction of the dam and canal. In 1842, he founded the community's first Unitarian Society. Straw was sent by the mills to England and Scotland in November 1844 to gather information and machinery for manufacturing and printing muslin delaines, which the Manchester Print Works introduced to the United States. In July 1851, he was appointed agent (manager) of Amoskeag.

Straw was a Republican state representative from 1859 to 1864 and a state senator from 1864 to 1866. In his second year in the state senate, he served as its president. In 1869, he was appointed to the staff of Governor Onslow Stearns. From 1872 to 1874, he served two terms as Republican governor of New Hampshire. Straw was treasurer and principal owner of the Namaske Mill from its organization at Manchester in 1856 until it was purchased by Amoskeag in 1875, and director of the Langdon Mills after Amoskeag acquired it in 1874. He was a principal figure in creation of the Manchester waterworks, gas light company and public library. In addition, he served as president of the Blodget Edge Tool Manufacturing Company, New England Cotton Manufacturers' Association (now the National Textile Association) and New Hampshire Fire Insurance Company.

On April 6, 1842, he married Charlotte Smith Webster, who bore him 4 children before dying on March 15, 1852. Their son, Herman F. Straw, would become agent of the Amoskeag Manufacturing Company from 1885 until 1919. Ezekiel A. Straw was awarded an honorary Master of Arts degree from Dartmouth College in 1860. He died in 1882 at Manchester and is buried in Valley Cemetery.

Party political offices
Preceded by James Pike	Republican nominee for Governor of New Hampshire; 1872, 1873	Succeeded by Luther McCutchins
Political offices
Preceded by James A. Weston	Governor of New Hampshire; 1872–1874	Succeeded by James A. Weston
Preceded by Charles H. Bell	President of the New Hampshire Senate; 1865–1865	Succeeded by Daniel Barnard
