= Aaron Fletcher Stevens =

American politician (1819–1887)

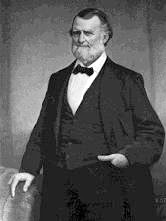

Member of the U.S. House of Representatives from New Hampshire's 2nd district
- In office March 4, 1867 – March 3, 1871
- Preceded by: Edward H. Rollins
- Succeeded by: Samuel Newell Bell

Personal details
- Born: August 9, 1819 Derry, New Hampshire
- Died: May 10, 1887 (aged 67) Nashua, New Hampshire
- Party: Republican

Military service
- Allegiance: United States of America; Union
- Branch/service: United States Army; Union Army
- Rank: Colonel; Brevet Brigadier General
- Unit: 1st New Hampshire Volunteer Infantry
- Commands: 13th New Hampshire Volunteer Infantry
- Battles/wars: American Civil War: Battle of Fredericksburg; Battle of Proctor's Creek; Battle of Chaffin's Farm

Aaron Fletcher Stevens (August 9, 1819 – May 10, 1887) was a Union Army officer during the American Civil War and a two-term U.S. Congressman.

== Birth and early years ==
Stevens was born in Londonderry, New Hampshire on August 9, 1819. He spent his childhood in both Londonderry and also nearby Peterborough and attended Pinkerton Academy. He was a machinist, lawyer and state legislator before the Civil War. In 1845, he was admitted to the New Hampshire Bar, and helped found the New Hampshire Republican Party in the mid-1850s.

== Civil War ==
When the Civil War began he joined the 1st New Hampshire Volunteer Infantry as a major. He was mustered out of the volunteers on August 9, 1861. He rejoined the Union Army on September 23, 1862 as colonel of the new 13th New Hampshire Infantry Regiment. He and the regiment participated in the disastrous attack against Marye's Heights in the Battle of Fredericksburg.

Stevens commanded Brigade 1, Division 1, IX Corps (Union Army), Department of Virginia, January – February, 1863 and Brigade 3, Division 1, XVIII Corps (Union Army), Army of the James, from July 31, 1864 to September 29, 1864. Stevens was wounded at the Battle of Fort Harrison on September 29, 1864.

On December 12, 1864, President Abraham Lincoln nominated Stevens for appointment to the grade of brevet brigadier general of volunteers, to rank from December 8, 1864, and the United States Senate confirmed the appointment on March 10, 1865. Stevens was mustered out of the volunteers on June 29, 1865.

Stevens served two terms in the United States House of Representatives, March 4, 1867 – March 3, 1871.

Aaron Fletcher Stevens died at Nashua, May 10, 1887. He was buried at Universalist Church Cemetery, Nashua, New Hamphshire.

== See also ==
- List of American Civil War brevet generals (Union)

== Notes ==
U.S. House of Representatives
Preceded by Edward H. Rollins	Member of the U.S. House of Representatives from New Hampshire's 2nd congressional district March 4, 1867-March 3, 1871	Succeeded by Samuel Newell Bell
