= George G. Fogg =

American politician (1813–1881)

George Gilman Fogg
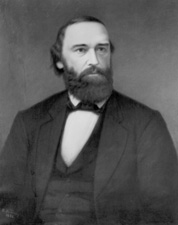

United States Senator from New Hampshire
- In office August 31, 1866 – March 3, 1867
- Appointed by: Frederick Smyth
- Preceded by: Daniel Clark
- Succeeded by: James W. Patterson

Secretary of State of New Hampshire
- In office June 9, 1846 – April 11, 1847
- Governor: Anthony Colby
- Preceded by: Thomas P. Treadwell
- Succeeded by: Thomas P. Treadwell

Member of the New Hampshire House of Representatives
- In office January 8, 1841 – January 19, 1846

Personal details
- Born: May 26, 1813 Meredith, New Hampshire, U.S.
- Died: October 5, 1881 (aged 68) Concord, New Hampshire, U.S.
- Party: Republican
- Education: Harvard University

George Gilman Fogg (May 26, 1813 – October 5, 1881) was an American politician and diplomat who served as a member of the United States Senate for New Hampshire from 1866 to 1867. From 1861 to 1865, Fogg served as the United States Ambassador to Switzerland. Fogg had previously served as a member of the New Hampshire House of Representatives and New Hampshire Secretary of State.

== Early life and education ==
The son of David Fogg and Hannah Gilman Vickery, he was born May 26, 1813, in Meredith, New Hampshire. He pursued classical studies and graduated from Dartmouth College in 1839. He studied law at Meredith and at the Harvard Law School, was admitted to the bar in 1842.

== Career ==
After being admitted to the bar, Fogg commenced practice in Gilmanton Ironworks, New Hampshire.

He moved to Concord, New Hampshire, and served as a member of the New Hampshire House of Representatives in 1846. From 1846 to 1847, he served as New Hampshire Secretary of State. He was a newspaper publisher from 1847 to 1861, and reporter of the New Hampshire Supreme Court from 1856 to 1860.

Fogg was secretary of the Republican National Executive Committee in 1860, and was appointed by President Abraham Lincoln as Minister Resident to Switzerland, holding that office from 1861 to 1865. He was appointed as a Republican to the U.S. Senate to fill the vacancy caused by the resignation of Daniel Clark and served from August 31, 1866, to March 3, 1867; he was not a candidate for election to the Senate in 1866. Fogg served as a fellow at Bates College from 1875 to 1881. He was editor of the Concord Daily Monitor and died in Concord in 1881.

U.S. Senate
Preceded by Daniel Clark	U.S. senator (Class 3) from New Hampshire; 1866–1867; Served alongside: Aaron H. Cragin	Succeeded by James W. Patterson
