= James Hutchins Johnson =

American politician

Member of the U.S. House of Representatives from New Hampshire
- In office March 4, 1845 – March 3, 1849
- Preceded by: John R. Reding
- Succeeded by: Harry Hibbard
- Constituency: At-large district (1845–1847); 4th district (1847–1849)

Member of the New Hampshire Executive Council
- In office 1842–1845

Member of the New Hampshire Senate
- In office 1839–1839

Personal details
- Born: June 3, 1802 Bath, New Hampshire, U.S.
- Died: September 2, 1887 (aged 85) Bath, New Hampshire, U.S.
- Resting place: Bath Village Cemetery
- Party: Democratic

James Hutchins Johnson (June 3, 1802 – September 2, 1887) was a businessman, militia officer, and politician from Bath, New Hampshire. Among the offices in which he served was U.S. Representative from 1845 to 1849.

== Early life ==
Johnson was born in Bath, New Hampshire on June 3, 1802. He was educated in Bath's public schools, and then became a merchant and businessman. Among his ventures were a store and sawmill. from the mid-1820s to the mid-1830s he resided in Lisbon, New Hampshire, afterwards returning to Bath.

== Military career ==
In 1826, Johnson joined the New Hampshire Militia's 32nd Regiment as its paymaster. He later served as its adjutant, and eventually commanded the regiment with the rank of colonel.

== Politics ==
He was deputy sheriff of Grafton County in 1824 and 1825. In 1836 he was elected to the New Hampshire House of Representatives. Johnson was a member of the New Hampshire Senate in 1839 and a member of the New Hampshire Executive Council in 1842 and 1845.

Johnson was elected as a Democrat to the Twenty-ninth and Thirtieth Congresses (March 4, 1845 – March 3, 1849).

== Death ==
He died in Bath, New Hampshire, September 2, 1887, and was interred at Bath Village Cemetery.

== Family ==
In 1828, Johnson married Jane Hutchins of Bath. They were the parents of six children, all but one of whom died before reaching adulthood. In 1847, Johnson married to Sophia Orne Edwards of Springfield, Massachusetts. They were the parents of a two sons (John Howard and Stanley Edwards) and one daughter (Sarah Hall).

== Sources ==
=== Books ===
- Childs, Hamilton (1886). Gazetteer of Grafton County, N. H. 1709-1886. Syracuse, NY: Journal Publishing Company.

U.S. House of Representatives
Preceded by at-large	U.S. Representative for the 4th district of New Hampshire; March 4, 1845–March 3, 1849	Succeeded by Harry Hibbard
