= William B. Small (politician) =

American politician (1817–1878)

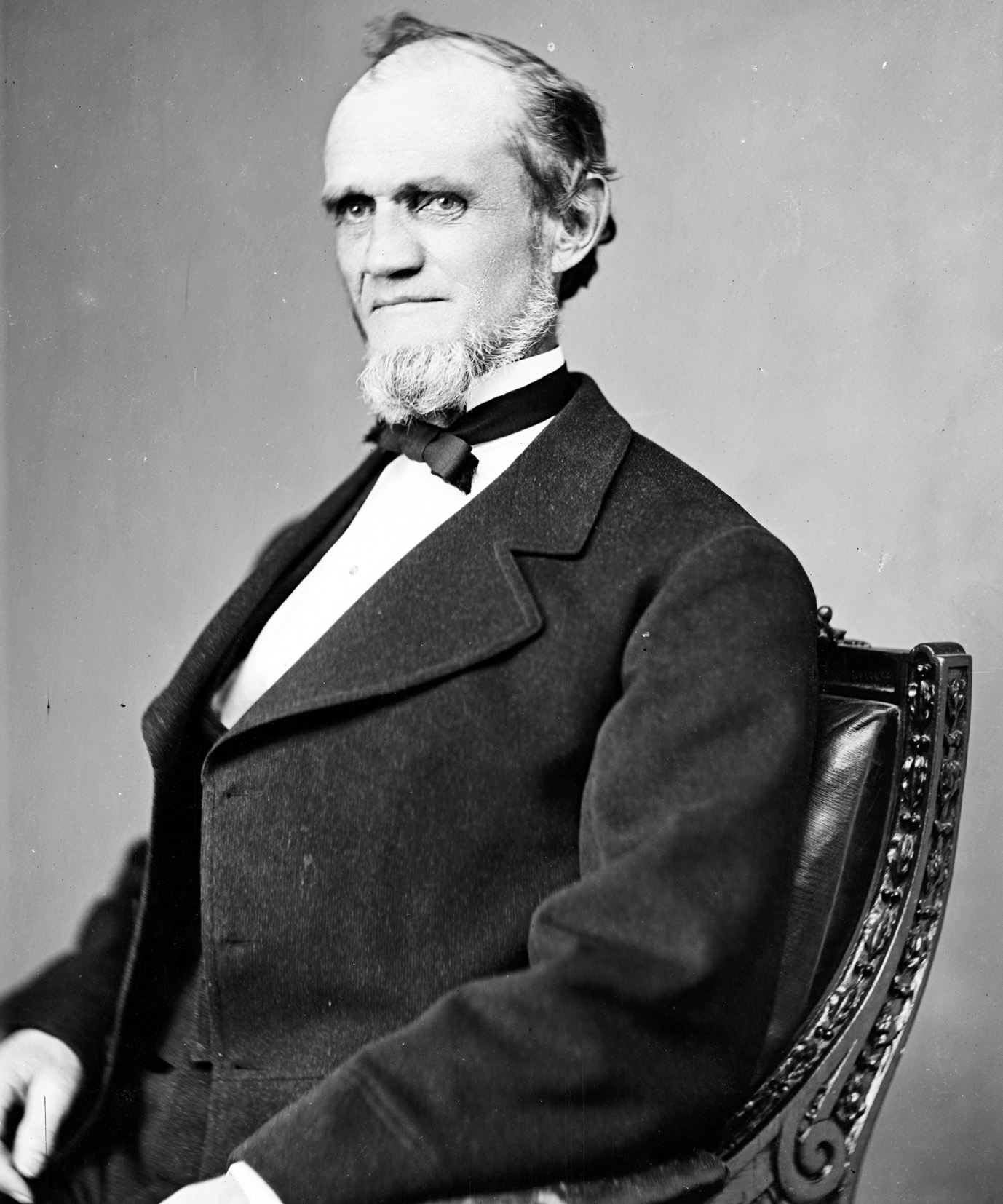

Member of the U.S. House of Representatives from New Hampshire's 1st district
- In office March 4, 1873 – March 3, 1875
- Preceded by: Ellery Albee Hibbard
- Succeeded by: Frank Jones

Member of the New Hampshire Senate
- In office 1870–1870

Member of the New Hampshire House of Representatives
- In office 1865

Personal details
- Born: May 17, 1817 Limington, Massachusetts (now Maine)
- Died: April 7, 1878 (aged 60) Newmarket, New Hampshire

William Bradbury Small (May 17, 1817 – April 7, 1878) was a U.S. Representative from New Hampshire.

Born in Limington in Massachusetts' District of Maine, Small moved with his parents to Ossipee, New Hampshire. He attended the public schools and Phillips Exeter Academy, Exeter, New Hampshire. He studied law and was admitted to the bar in 1846, commencing practice in Newmarket, New Hampshire, and serving as solicitor of Rockingham County. He was a member of the New Hampshire House of Representatives in 1865 and served in the New Hampshire Senate in 1870.

Small was elected as a Republican to the Forty-third Congress (March 4, 1873 – March 3, 1875). He was not a candidate for renomination in 1874. He resumed the practice of law and also engaged in banking. He died in Newmarket, New Hampshire, April 7, 1878, and was interred in Riverside Cemetery.

U.S. House of Representatives
Preceded by Ellery Albee Hibbard	U.S. Representative for the 1st District of New Hampshire; March 4, 1873 – March 3, 1875	Succeeded by Frank Jones
