= Ellery Albee Hibbard =

American judge (1826–1903)

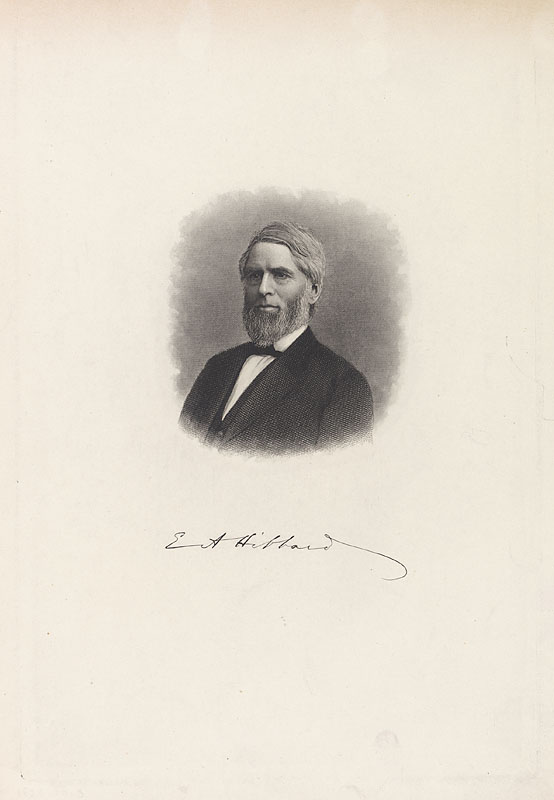

Member of the U.S. House of Representatives from New Hampshire's 1st district
- In office March 4, 1871 – March 3, 1873
- Preceded by: Jacob Hart Ela
- Succeeded by: William B. Small

Member of the New Hampshire House of Representatives
- In office 1852-1854; 1865-1866

Personal details
- Born: July 31, 1826 St. Johnsbury, Vermont, US
- Died: July 24, 1903 (aged 76) Laconia, New Hampshire, US
- Resting place: Union Cemetery; Laconia, Belknap County; New Hampshire, USA
- Party: Democratic
- Spouse(s): Mary Houston Bell Hibbard; Mary B Hibbard
- Relations: Harry Hibbard cousin
- Children: Charles Bell Hibbard; Jennie Olive Hibbard Lougee; Walter Silas Hibbard; Laura Bartlett Hibbard
- Parent(s): Silas Hibbard; Olive Albee Hibbard
- Occupation: Lawyer; Judge; Politician

Ellery Albee Hibbard (July 31, 1826 – July 24, 1903) was an American politician, a lawyer, a judge, and a U.S. Representative from New Hampshire.

== Early life ==
Born on July 31, 1826, in St. Johnsbury, Vermont, Hibbard pursued academic studies, then read law with Nathan B. Felton and Charles A. Morrison in Haverhill and Exeter, New Hampshire. He was admitted to the bar in 1849.

== Career ==
Hibbard practiced in Plymouth, New Hampshire, until 1853, and then in Laconia, Belknap County, New Hampshire. He served as clerk of the New Hampshire House of Representatives, 1852–1854, as Moderator of Laconia in 1862 and 1863, and as a member of the New Hampshire House of Representatives in 1865 and 1866.

Elected as a Democrat to the Forty-second Congress, Hibbard served as United States Representative for the state of New Hampshire from (March 4, 1871 – March 3, 1873). He was an unsuccessful candidate for reelection in 1872 to the Forty-third Congress. He was appointed judge of the New Hampshire Supreme Court in March 1873 and served until 1874, when he resigned and continued the practice of law. He served as director of Laconia National Bank, as a member of the board of education of Laconia.

== Death ==
Hibbard died in Laconia, New Hampshire, on July 24, 1903, aged 75. He is interred at Union Cemetery, Laconia, New Hampshire.

== Family life ==
Son of Silas and Olive Albee, Hibbard married Mary Houston Bell on December 5, 1853, and they had four children, Charles Bell, Jennie Olive, Walter Silas, and Laura Bartlett. He was a cousin of Harry Hibbard.

U.S. House of Representatives
Preceded by Jacob Hart Ela	U.S. Representative for the 1st District of New Hampshire; 1871 – 1873	Succeeded by William B. Small
