= James W. Patterson =

American politician (1823–1893)

James Patterson
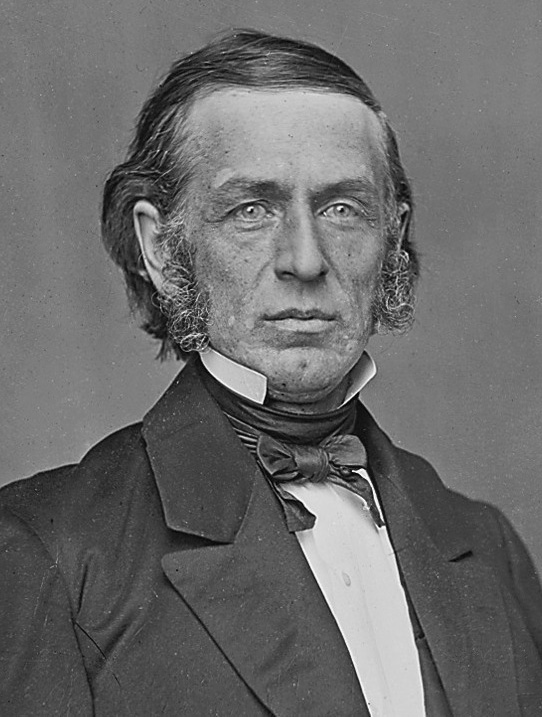

United States Senator from New Hampshire
- In office March 4, 1867 – March 3, 1873
- Preceded by: George G. Fogg
- Succeeded by: Bainbridge Wadleigh

Member of the U.S. House of Representatives from New Hampshire's 3rd district
- In office March 4, 1863 – March 3, 1867
- Preceded by: Thomas M. Edwards
- Succeeded by: Jacob Benton

Member of the New Hampshire House of Representatives
- In office 1862

Personal details
- Born: James Willis Patterson; July 2, 1823 Henniker, New Hampshire, U.S.
- Died: May 4, 1893 (aged 69) Hanover, New Hampshire, U.S.
- Party: Republican
- Spouse: Sarah Parker Wilder
- Children: 2
- Education: Dartmouth College (BA)

James Willis Patterson (July 2, 1823 – May 4, 1893) was an American politician and a United States representative and senator from New Hampshire.

== Early life, education and family ==
Born in Henniker, Merrimack County, New Hampshire, he was the son of William and Frances M. Shepard Patterson.

Patterson pursued classical studies, graduated from Dartmouth College in 1848, and was principal of the Woodstock Academy in Connecticut for two years. He attended the Theological Seminary at New Haven, Connecticut, where he studied law.

He married Sarah Parker Wilder and they had two children, George Willis Patterson and Arthur Hubert Patterson.

== Early career ==
Patterson was a professor of mathematics, astronomy, and meteorology at Dartmouth College from 1854 to 1865.

Patterson was a member of the New Hampshire House of Representatives in 1862.

== U.S. Representative ==
Elected as a Republican to the Thirty-eighth and Thirty-ninth Congresses Patterson was a United States representative for the third district of New Hampshire from (March 4, 1863 - March 3, 1867). He was elected to the U.S. Senate and served from March 4, 1867, to March 3, 1873.

In the Senate he was chairman of the Committee on Enrolled Bills during the Forty-first Congress and a member of the Committee on the District of Columbia during the Forty-first and Forty-second Congresses.

=== Expulsion case ===
On September 4, 1872, The Sun reported that Patterson and many other politicians was found to have been bribed by the Union Pacific Railroad, and Crédit Mobilier. Later, the House of Representatives created the Poland Committee to investigate these accusations. In December 1872, the Poland Committee found out that many high tier Republican officials were involved with the scandal. On February 4, 1873, Patterson tried to convince the senate to appoint a specific committee.

The committee found out that Patterson gave Crédit Mobilier official Oakes Ames 7,000 dollars to invest for him. Patterson claimed that since Ames gave him no written receipt, he was unaware that he owned some of the stock. A report to the Senate said that Patterson gave a false testimony to both the House and Senate committees. by this time both the house and the senate were recommending that he be expelled. Pattersons term ended before congress could’ve taken further action.

== Later career ==
Patterson was a regent of the Smithsonian Institution and in 1877-1878 was again a member of the State house of representatives. He was State superintendent of public instruction from 1881 to 1893, and president of American Institute of Instruction.

== Death ==
Patterson died in Hanover, Grafton County, New Hampshire, on May 4, 1893 (age 69 years, 306 days). He is interred at Dartmouth College Cemetery, Hanover, New Hampshire.

The Patterson School, which was merged with the Garnett school in 1929 and then became Shaw Middle School at Garnett-Patterson, in Washington, DC was named in his honor because he sponsored the legislation creating a public school system for black students in Washington, DC. It was closed in 2013.

== See also ==
- List of United States senators expelled or censured
- List of federal political scandals in the United States

U.S. House of Representatives
Preceded by Thomas M. Edwards	Member of the U.S. House of Representatives from New Hampshire's 3rd congressional district 1863–1867	Succeeded by Jacob Benton
U.S. Senate
Preceded by George G. Fogg	U.S. Senator (Class 3) from New Hampshire; 1867–1873; Served alongside: Aaron H. Cragin	Succeeded by Bainbridge Wadleigh
Preceded by Hannibal Hamlin	Chair of the Senate District of Columbia Committee; 1870–1873	Succeeded by John F. Lewis
