= Harry Hibbard =

American politician (1816–1872)

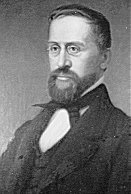

Member of the U.S. House of Representatives from New Hampshire
- In office March 4, 1849 – March 3, 1855
- Preceded by: James Hutchins Johnson
- Succeeded by: Aaron H. Cragin
- Constituency: 4th district (1849–1853); 3rd district (1853–1855)

Member of the New Hampshire Senate
- In office 1845; 1847-1848

Member of the New Hampshire House of Representatives
- In office 1843-1845

Personal details
- Born: June 1, 1816 Concord, Vermont, U.S.
- Died: July 28, 1872 (aged 56) Somerville, Massachusetts, U.S.
- Resting place: Village Cemetery, Bath, New Hampshire, U.S.
- Party: Democratic
- Spouse: Sara King Hale Bellows Hibbard
- Relations: Ellery Albee Hibbard
- Children: 1
- Education: Dartmouth College
- Profession: Lawyer; Politician

Harry Hibbard (June 1, 1816 – July 28, 1872) was an American politician and a United States Representative from New Hampshire.

== Early life ==
Born in Concord, Vermont, Hibbard pursued classical studies. He graduated from Dartmouth College, Hanover, New Hampshire in 1835 where he studied law. After graduation, he was admitted to the bar in 1838 and commenced practice in Bath, Grafton County, New Hampshire.

== Career ==
Hibbard was an assistant clerk and clerk of the New Hampshire House of Representatives from 1840 to 1842. He served as an elected member of the New Hampshire House of Representatives from 1843 to 1845 and Speaker in 1844 and 1845. He served in the New Hampshire Senate in 1845, 1847, and 1848 and as president of that body in 1847 and 1848. In addition, he served as a delegate to the Democratic National Convention in 1848 and 1856.

Elected as a Democrat to the Thirty-first, Thirty-second, and Thirty-third Congresses, Hibbard served as United States Representative for the state of New Hampshire from (March 4, 1849 – March 3, 1855). He was not a candidate for renomination in 1854. After leaving Congress, he declined an appointment to the New Hampshire Supreme Court.

== Death ==
Hibbard died in a sanatorium in Somerville, Massachusetts on July 28, 1872, and is interred at the Village Cemetery, Bath, New Hampshire.

== Family life ==
Son of David and Susannah Streeter, Hibbard married Sara King Hale Bellows on May 13, 1848, and they had one daughter, Alice.

U.S. House of Representatives
Preceded by James Hutchins Johnson	Member of the U.S. House of Representatives from New Hampshire's 4th congressional district March 4, 1849 – March 3, 1853	Succeeded by District Eliminated
Preceded by Jared Perkins	Member of the U.S. House of Representatives from New Hampshire's 3rd congressional district March 3, 1853 – March 3, 1855	Succeeded by Aaron H. Cragin
Political offices
Preceded by James U. Parker	President of the New Hampshire Senate; 1847–1848	Succeeded by William P. Weeks
Preceded by Samuel Swasey	Speaker of the New Hampshire House of Representatives; 1844–1845	Succeeded by John P. Hale
