= 1st New Hampshire Infantry Regiment =

- Active: May 1–7 – August 1861
- Country: United States
- Allegiance: Union
- Branch: United States Army; Union Army
- Type: Infantry
- March: "Yankee Doodle"

Commanders
- Notable commanders: Colonel Mason Tappan

1st New Hampshire Infantry Regiment filled its ranks within two weeks of President Lincoln's call for 70,000 men on April 15, 1861. Between April 17 and 30, 1861, not less than 2,004 men volunteered to fight for the Union in the American Civil War. The volunteers organized and mustered at "Camp Union," the Fair Grounds of the Merrimack County Agricultural Society on the east side of the Merrimack River, in Concord between May 1 and May 7, 1861.

After the 1st NH was filled, volunteers were given their choice to enlist in the 2nd New Hampshire Volunteer Regiment or serve their three months as the garrison of Fort Constitution at Portsmouth Harbor. Four hundred and ninety-six (496) enlisted in the 2nd NH, and the remainder were sent to Fort Constitution.

In early May 1861, Baldwin's Cornet Band, of Manchester, under the leadership of Edwin T. Baldwin, joined the regiment. The law at the time made no provision for regimental bands, thus band members were not mustered in until vacancies occurred in companies, and where they became privates or company musicians but continued their duty in the band.

The 1st NH was commanded by Colonel Mason Tappan and later assigned to General Patterson's Army of the Shenandoah. In August 1861, the 1st NH was mustered out at the end of its three months. The average age of the officers was 36 and enlisted men was 24.

== Flags ==
The regiment was given two flags that were made in San Francisco, California. The National flag was made of silk and measured six feet six inches squared. The canton had 34 golden stars around a painting of Libertas next to the coat of arms of California and Maine. While on the other side of the canton contained an illustration of a bald eagle placed on an American shield with its wings spread out and its beak open.

The regimental flag was made of silk with a deep blue field bearing a painting of Minerva holding a spear. Near her feet was a bear and a ship in the background both based on their states coat of arms. The whole illustration was encircled by a gold band with 34 golden stars around it. The inscription "First N. H. Regt," was embroidered in silver across the field.

== See also ==
- 1st New Hampshire Regiment (American Revolutionary War)
- 197th Field Artillery Regiment (United States)
- List of New Hampshire Civil War Units
