= Aaron H. Cragin =

American politician (1821–1898)

Aaron Harrison Cragin
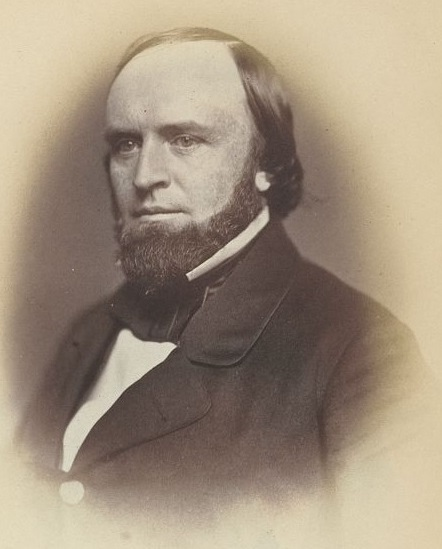

Member of the U.S. House of Representatives from New Hampshire's 3rd district
- In office March 4, 1855 – March 3, 1859
- Preceded by: Harry Hibbard
- Succeeded by: Thomas M. Edwards

United States Senator from New Hampshire
- In office March 4, 1865 – March 3, 1877
- Preceded by: John P. Hale
- Succeeded by: Edward H. Rollins

Member of the New Hampshire House of Representatives
- In office 1852–1855

Personal details
- Born: February 3, 1821 Weston, Vermont
- Died: May 10, 1898 (aged 77) Washington, D.C.
- Resting place: School Street Cemetery; Lebanon, Grafton County; New Hampshire
- Party: American Party; Republican
- Spouse: Isabella Tuller Cragin
- Children: Harry Wilton Cragin
- Parent(s): Aaron Cragin; Sarah Whitney Cragin
- Occupation: Lawyer; Politician

Aaron Harrison Cragin (February 3, 1821 – May 10, 1898) was an American politician and a United States representative and senator from New Hampshire.

== Early life ==
Born in Weston, Vermont, Cragin completed preparatory studies, studied law, was admitted to the bar in Albany, New York in 1847 and commenced practice in Lebanon, New Hampshire.

== Career ==
Cragin was a member of the New Hampshire House of Representatives from 1852 to 1855.

Elected by the American Party to the Thirty-fourth Congress and as a Republican to the Thirty-fifth Congress, Cragin served from (March 4, 1855 – March 3, 1859). While in the House of Representatives, he was chairman of the Committee on Expenditures in the Department of War (Thirty-fourth Congress).

Cragin resumed the practice of law and in 1859 was again a member of the State house of representatives. In 1860 he was a delegate to the Republican Convention in Chicago, and a delegate to the Philadelphia loyalists convention in 1866. He was elected as a Republican to the United States Senate in 1864; was reelected in 1870, and served from March 4, 1865, to March 3, 1877. While in the Senate he was chairman of the Committee on Engrossed Bills (Thirty-ninth Congress) and a member of the Committee to Audit and Control the Contingent Expense (Fortieth and Forty-first Congresses), the Committee on Naval Affairs (Forty-first and Forty-third Congresses), and the Committee on Railroads (Forty-third and Forty-fourth Congresses).

Appointed by President Rutherford Hayes as one of the commissioners for the purchase of the Hot Springs Reservation in Arkansas, Cragin served as chairman from 1877 to 1879.

== Death ==
Cragin died in Washington, D.C., on May 10, 1898 (age 77 years, 96 days). He is interred at School Street Cemetery, Lebanon, New Hampshire.

== Family life ==
Son of Aaron and Sarah Whitney, Cragin married Isabella Tuller and they had a son, Harry Wilton Cragin, who graduated from Yale University and was appointed third assistant in the United States Patent Office.

U.S. Senate
Preceded by John P. Hale	U.S. senator (Class 2) from New Hampshire; 1865–1877; Served alongside: Daniel Clark, George G. Fogg, James W. Patterson, Bainbridge Wadleigh	Succeeded by Edward H. Rollins
U.S. House of Representatives
Preceded by Harry Hibbard	U.S. Representative for the 3rd district of New Hampshire; 1855–1859	Succeeded by Thomas M. Edwards
