= Edward H. Rollins =

American politician (1824–1889)

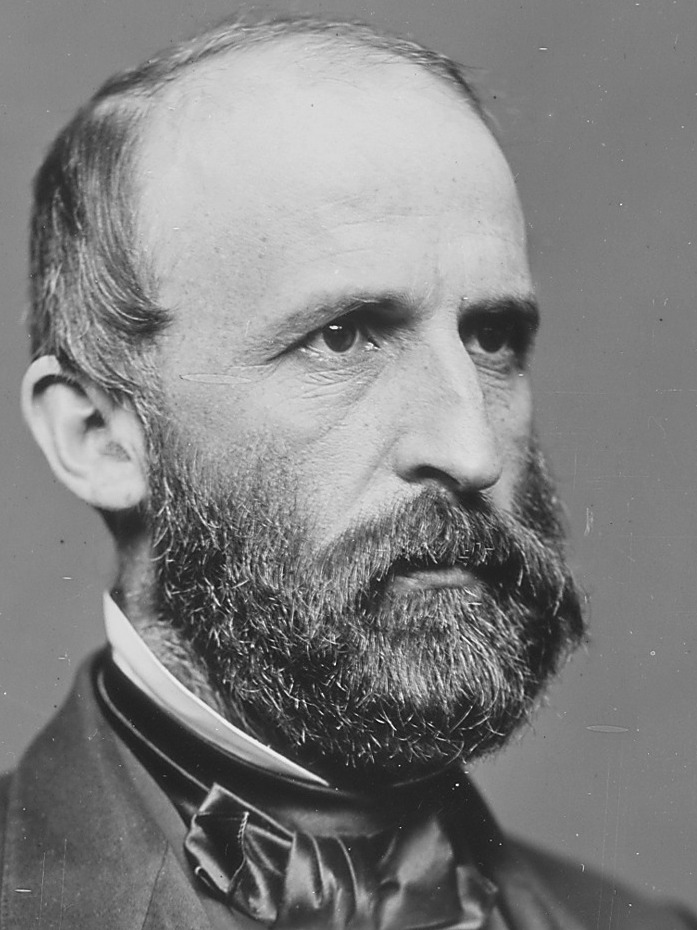

United States Senator from New Hampshire
- In office March 4, 1877 – March 3, 1883
- Preceded by: Aaron H. Cragin
- Succeeded by: Austin F. Pike

Member of the U.S. House of Representatives from New Hampshire's 2nd district
- In office March 4, 1861 – March 3, 1867
- Preceded by: Mason Tappan
- Succeeded by: Aaron Fletcher Stevens

Member of the New Hampshire House of Representatives
- In office 1855–1857

Personal details
- Born: Edward Henry Rollins; October 3, 1824 Somersworth, New Hampshire (now Rollinsford)
- Died: July 31, 1889 (aged 64) Isles of Shoals, New Hampshire
- Party: Republican
- Children: Frank W. Rollins

Edward Henry Rollins (October 3, 1824 – July 31, 1889) was a United States representative and Senator from New Hampshire.

== Biography ==
Born in a part of Somersworth, New Hampshire which is now Rollinsford, he attended the common schools and academies in Dover, New Hampshire and South Berwick, Maine. He engaged in mercantile pursuits at Concord, New Hampshire and was a member of the New Hampshire House of Representatives from 1855 to 1857, and served as speaker.

Rollins was elected as a Republican to the 37th, 38th, and 39th Congresses, serving from March 4, 1861 to March 3, 1867; he was not a candidate for renomination in 1866. While in the House of Representatives, he was chairman of the Committee on Accounts (38th and 39th Congresses). He was secretary and treasurer of the Union Pacific Railroad, and in 1876 was elected to the United States Senate and served from March 4, 1877, to March 3, 1883; he was an unsuccessful candidate for reelection. While in the Senate, he was chairman of the Committee on Manufactures (45th Congress) and a member of the Committee on Enrolled Bills (47th Congress) and the Committee on Public Buildings and Grounds (47th Congress).

From 1886 to 1889, Rollins was president of the Boston, Concord & Montreal Railroad, and was founder of the First National Bank of Concord, New Hampshire, and of the banking house of E. H. Rollins & Sons, Boston.

He died on the Isles of Shoals, New Hampshire in 1889; interment was in Blossom Hill Cemetery, Concord.

His son Frank W. Rollins served as Governor of New Hampshire from 1899 to 1901.

U.S. Senate
Preceded by Aaron H. Cragin	U.S. senator (Class 2) from New Hampshire; 1877–1883; Served alongside: Bainbridge Wadleigh, Mason Tappan, Henry W. Blair	Succeeded by Austin F. Pike
U.S. House of Representatives
Preceded by George W. Morrison	Member of the U.S. House of Representatives from New Hampshire's 2nd congressional district March 4, 1861 – March 3, 1867	Succeeded by Aaron Fletcher Stevens
