= James A. Weston =

American politician (1827–1895)

James Adams Weston
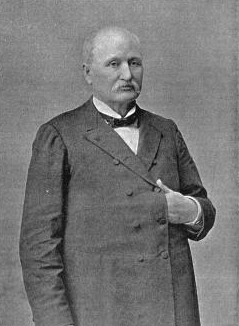

33rd Governor of New Hampshire
- In office June 3, 1874 – June 10, 1875
- Preceded by: Ezekiel A. Straw
- Succeeded by: Person Colby Cheney
- In office June 14, 1871 – June 6, 1872
- Preceded by: Onslow Stearns
- Succeeded by: Ezekiel A. Straw

18th Mayor of Manchester, New Hampshire
- In office 1870–1871
- Preceded by: Isaac W. Smith
- Succeeded by: Person Colby Cheney

16th Mayor of Manchester, New Hampshire
- In office 1868–1868
- Preceded by: Joseph B. Clark
- Succeeded by: Isaac W. Smith

Personal details
- Born: August 27, 1827 Manchester, New Hampshire
- Died: May 8, 1895 (aged 67) Manchester, New Hampshire
- Party: Democratic
- Spouse: Anna S. Gilmore Weston
- Children: 5
- Education: Dartmouth College (honorary MA)
- Profession: Civil engineer, banker, politician

James Adams Weston (August 27, 1827 – May 8, 1895) was a civil engineer, banker, and an American politician from Manchester, New Hampshire, who served as mayor of Manchester for several terms and was the 33rd governor of New Hampshire.

== Early life ==
Weston was born in Manchester, New Hampshire, and grew up helping on the family farm. He was educated in the district school, the Manchester Academy and the Piscataquog Academy. Determined to become a civil engineer, he taught school during the winters, and at the age of nineteen, was appointed assistant civil engineer of the Concord Railroad in 1846.

== Career ==
Promoted to the position of Chief Engineer in 1849, Weston was also performed the duties of road master and master of transportation of the Concord and the Manchester & Lawrence railroads. He surveyed and superintended the construction of the Concord water-works.

Though Manchester was predominantly a Republican city, Weston was elected mayor of Manchester in 1861, 1867, 1869 to 1870 and in 1873.

Having secured the 1871 Democratic gubernatorial nomination, Weston was named by the legislature as the official governor after a close election. During that same year, Dartmouth College bestowed an honorary Master of Arts degree upon him. He served from June 14, 1871, to June 6, 1872. Failing in 1872 and 1873, he was successful in winning reelection in 1874 and served from June 3, 1874, to June 10, 1875. During his two terms, Democratic judges were appointed and an important railroad merger was authorized.

== 1875 State Senate controversy ==
In 1875, in the final days of his term as governor, Weston ignited controversy by invalidating ballots to engineer a Democratic majority in the State Senate. In districts 2 and 4, Democrats James Priest and John Proctor narrowly placed first over their Republican opponents, Nathaniel Head and George Todd. However, neither Priest nor Proctor won majorities, which was required for election to the State Senate under the state constitution. If no candidate won a majority, the election would have been decided by the General Court, which, owing to the narrow Republican majority in the State House, would likely have elected Head and Todd.

Accordingly, Weston exercised his constitutional power to "examine election results and issue summonses to the winners" and declared the Democratic candidates the rightful winners. In district 2, Weston and the state executive council invalidated the 3,771 votes cast for "Natt Head" on the grounds that they "did not contain the full Christian name of the candidate voted for" and 3 votes cast for other candidates who did not live in the district. And in district 4, they excluded 2 votes cast for "G. E. Todd" because they did not "contain the full Christian name of the candidate voted for" and 59 votes cast for non-resident candidates. Weston issued summonses to Priest and Proctor, who were seated in the State Senate. The 7–5 majority in the State Senate then voted on party lines to reject a challenge to Priest's and Proctor's qualification. The Republican minority in the State Senate then requested an advisory opinion from the New Hampshire Supreme Court, which ultimately concluded that "the action of the senate is final."

== Death ==
Weston died in Manchester on May 8, 1895 (age 67 years, 254 days). He is interred at Pine Grove Cemetery, Manchester, Hillsborough County, New Hampshire.

== Family life ==
Son of Amos and Elizabeth Betsey Wilson Weston, he married Anna S. Gilmore on February 23, 1834; they had five children: Grace W., James Henry Weston, Edwin Bell, Anna Mabel, and Herman.

== See also ==
- List of mayors of Manchester, New Hampshire

Party political offices
Preceded by John Bedell	Democratic nominee for Governor of New Hampshire; 1871, 1872, 1873, 1874	Succeeded by Hiram R. Roberts
Political offices
Preceded by Joseph B. Clark	Mayor of Manchester, New Hampshire; 1868–1868	Succeeded by Isaac W. Smith
Preceded by Isaac W. Smith	Mayor of Manchester, New Hampshire; 1870–1871	Succeeded by Person Colby Cheney
Preceded by Onslow Stearns	Governor of New Hampshire; 1871–1872	Succeeded by Ezekiel A. Straw
Preceded by Ezekiel A. Straw	Governor of New Hampshire; 1874–1875	Succeeded by Person Colby Cheney
