= Mason Tappan =

American politician (1817–1886)

Mason Weare Tappan
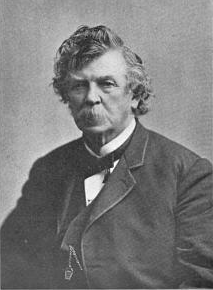

Member of the U.S. House of Representatives from New Hampshire's 2nd district
- In office March 4, 1855 – March 3, 1861
- Preceded by: George W. Morrison
- Succeeded by: Edward H. Rollins

Member of the New Hampshire House of Representatives
- In office 1853–1855

Personal details
- Born: October 20, 1817 Newport, New Hampshire, U.S.
- Died: October 25, 1886 (aged 69) Bradford, New Hampshire, U.S.
- Party: Know Nothing
- Other political affiliations: Republican

Military service
- Allegiance: United States
- Branch/service: (United States) Union Army
- Years of service: 1861
- Rank: Colonel
- Commands: 1st New Hampshire Infantry
- Battles/wars: American Civil War

Mason Weare Tappan (October 20, 1817 – October 25, 1886) was a New Hampshire state representative, a U.S. congressman from 1855 to 1861, a colonel during the American Civil War and the New Hampshire Attorney General.

He was born in Newport, New Hampshire, and grew up in Bradford. He attended private schools and the Hopkinton and Meriden academies. He studied law and was admitted to the bar in 1841 and commenced practice in Bradford.

Tappan served in the New Hampshire House of Representatives 1853 to 1855. He was elected as an American Party candidate to the Thirty-fourth Congress and reelected as a Republican to the Thirty-fifth and Thirty-sixth congresses (March 4, 1855 – March 3, 1861). While in Congress, he served as chairman, Committee on Claims (Thirty-sixth Congress). He was not a candidate for renomination in 1860.

During the Civil War, he served as colonel of the 1st New Hampshire Infantry, a three-months regiment raised in 1861 in response to President Abraham Lincoln's call to arms. He mustered out in August 1861.

Tappan died in office as the New Hampshire Attorney General at the age of 69. He is buried in Pleasant Hill Cemetery, Bradford, New Hampshire.

U.S. House of Representatives
Preceded by George W. Morrison	Member of the U.S. House of Representatives from New Hampshire's 2nd congressional district March 4, 1855 – March 3, 1861	Succeeded by Edward H. Rollins
Legal offices
Preceded by Lewis W. Clark	New Hampshire Attorney General; 1876-1886	Succeeded by Daniel Barnard
