= Jacob Hart Ela =

American politician (1820–1884)

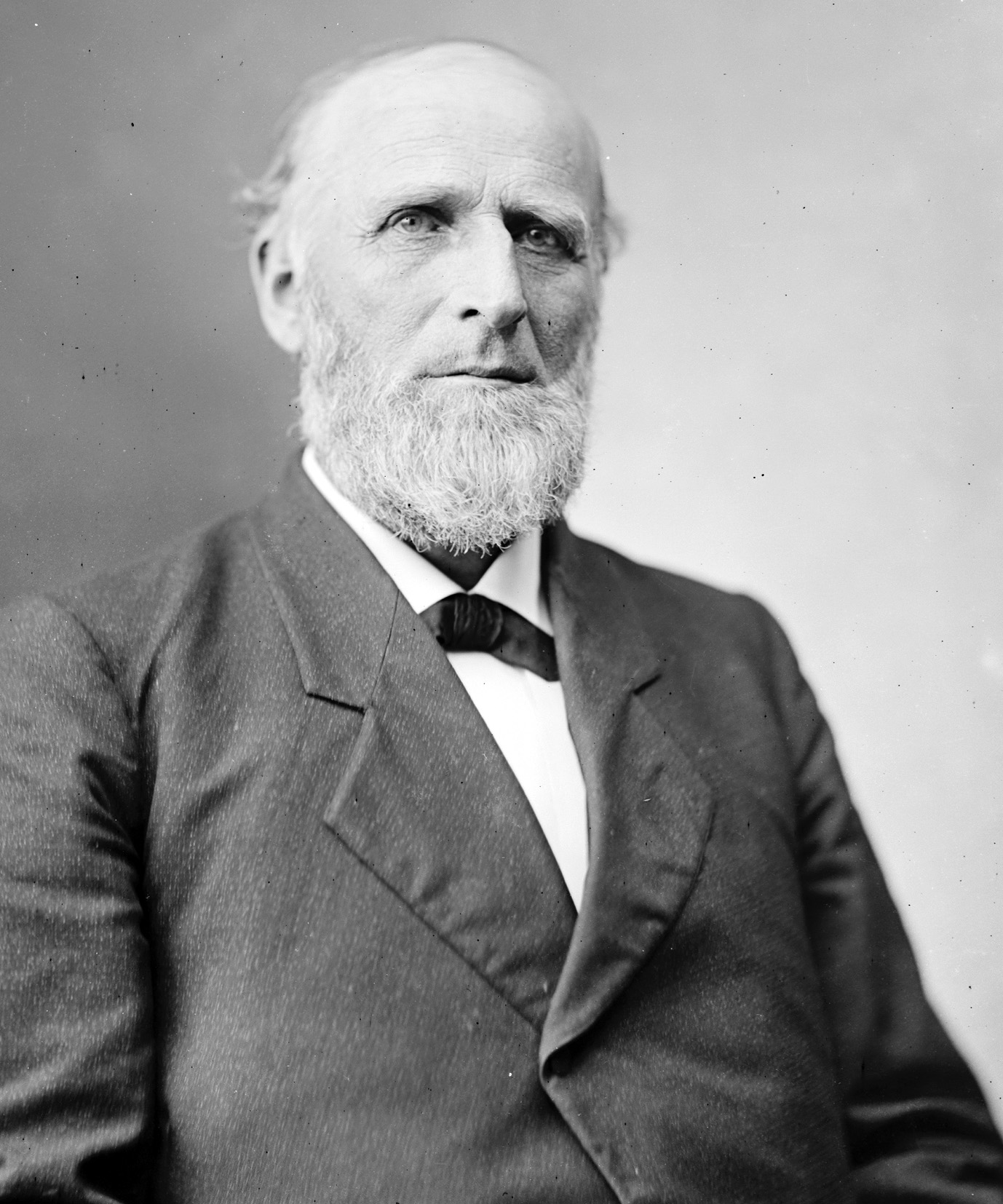

Member of the U.S. House of Representatives from New Hampshire's 1st district
- In office March 4, 1867 – March 3, 1871
- Preceded by: Gilman Marston
- Succeeded by: Ellery Albee Hibbard

Auditor of the Treasury for the Post Office Department
- In office June 3, 1881 – August 21, 1884 (death)

Member of the New Hampshire House of Representatives
- In office 1857-1858

Personal details
- Born: July 18, 1820 Rochester, New Hampshire, U.S.
- Died: August 21, 1884 (aged 64) Washington, D.C., U.S.
- Resting place: Rochester Cemetery; Rochester, New Hampshire, U.S.
- Party: Republican
- Spouse(s): Abigail (Moore) Kelley Ela; Mary Handerson Ela
- Children: Frederic P. Ela; Wendell P. Ela; Charles S. Ela
- Occupation: Printer; Politician; U. S. Marshal; Auditor

Jacob Hart Ela (July 18, 1820 – August 21, 1884) was an American politician and a U.S. Representative from New Hampshire.

== Early life ==
Born in Rochester, New Hampshire, Ela attended the village school in Rochester. At fourteen years of age he was apprenticed in a woolen manufactory and subsequently learned the printer's trade.

== Career ==
Ela served as member of the New Hampshire House of Representatives in 1857 and 1858 and as United States marshal from July 1861 to October 1866.

Elected as a Republican to the Fortieth and Forty-first Congresses, Ela served as United States Representative for the 1st congressional district or the state of New Hampshire (March 4, 1867 – March 3, 1871). He served as chairman of the Committee on Expenditures in the Department of the Interior (Forty-first Congress).

Ela was appointed by President Grant as Fifth Auditor of the Treasury on January 1, 1872, and served until June 2, 1881. On June 3, 1881, he was appointed Auditor of the Treasury for the Post Office Department and served in that position until his death.

== Death ==
Ela died in Washington, D.C., on August 21, 1884 (age 64 years, 34 days). He is interred at Rochester Cemetery, Rochester, New Hampshire.

== Family life ==
The name Ela first comes to the US in the late 1630s, and the US family originates from Haverhill, Massachusetts, in the early 16th century, where the Ela family cemetery is located at Walnut Hill Cemetery in Haverhill, Massachusetts.

Ela married the widow, Abigail (Moore) Kelley and they had three sons, Frederic P., Wendell P., and Charles S. Abigail died in September 1879, and he married Mary Handerson on October 2, 1880.

U.S. House of Representatives
Preceded by Gilman Marston	U.S. Representative for the 1st District of New Hampshire; 1867 – 1871	Succeeded by Ellery Albee Hibbard
