= Onslow Stearns =

American politician (1810-1878)

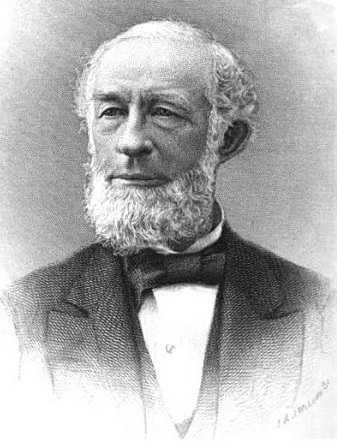

32nd Governor of New Hampshire
- In office June 3, 1869 – June 14, 1871
- Preceded by: Walter Harriman
- Succeeded by: James A. Weston

Member of the New Hampshire Senate
- In office 1862-1864

Personal details
- Born: August 30, 1810 Billerica, Massachusetts
- Died: December 29, 1878 (aged 68) Concord, New Hampshire
- Party: Republican
- Spouse: Mary Abbot Holbrook
- Children: Charles; Mary; Margaret; Sarah; Grace
- Relatives: Onslow S. Rolfe (grandson)
- Profession: Railroad executive

Onslow Stearns (August 30, 1810 – December 29, 1878) was an American businessman and politician who served as the 32nd governor of New Hampshire.

== Biography ==
Stearns was born in Billerica, Massachusetts on August 30, 1810. He attended the local schools of his hometown, and moved to Boston, where he clerked in several stores in preparation for a business career.

After moving to Concord, Stearns established himself in business. Starting as a construction contractor in partnership with his brother, Stearns eventually became a manager and executive, and was active in several different railroads, including the Lowell and Nashua, Northern Railroad of New Hampshire, Vermont Central Railway, and Old Colony Railroad.

In 1857 Stearns received the honorary degree of Master of Arts from Dartmouth College.

Stearns became active in politics as a Republican, serving in the New Hampshire State Senate from 1862 to 1864. He served as the Senate's President pro tempore in 1863, and was a Delegate to the 1864 Republican National Convention.

Stearns ran successfully for governor in 1869 and was reelected in 1870. During his time in office the state created a board of agriculture, taxes and deficits necessitated by New Hampshire's participation in the American Civil War were lowered, and the state government continued to promote the development of railroads and manufacturing business.

After leaving office Stearns retired from politics and resumed his business interests. He died in Concord, New Hampshire on December 29, 1878, and was buried in the Blossom Hill Cemetery in Concord.

Stearns' daughter Mary was the wife of General John R. Brooke. His daughter Grace was the mother of General Onslow S. Rolfe.

Party political offices
Preceded by Walter Harriman	Republican nominee for Governor of New Hampshire; 1869, 1870	Succeeded by James Pike
Political offices
Preceded by Walter Harriman	Governor of New Hampshire; 1869–1871	Succeeded by James A. Weston
Preceded by William H. Y. Hackett	President of the New Hampshire Senate; 1863	Succeeded by Charles H. Bell
