= 1842 New Hampshire gubernatorial election =

- March 8, 1842
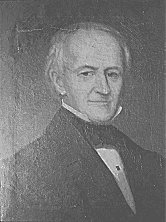

Nominee	Henry Hubbard	Enos Stevens
Party	Democratic	Whig
Popular vote	26,831	12,234
Percentage	55.78%	25.43%
Nominee	John H. White	Daniel Hoit
Party	Independent Democrat	Liberty
Popular vote	5,869	2,812
Percentage	12.20%	5.85%
- County results Hubbard: 40–50% 50–60% 70–80%
Governor before election
John Page
Democratic
Elected Governor
Henry Hubbard
Democratic

The 1842 New Hampshire gubernatorial election was held on March 8, 1842.

Incumbent Democratic Governor John Page did not stand for re-election.

Democratic nominee Henry Hubbard defeated Whig nominee Enos Stevens, Independent Democrat nominee John H. White, and Liberty nominee Daniel Hoit with 55.78% of the vote.

== General election ==
=== Candidates ===
- Daniel Hoit, Liberty, former State Senator, Liberty nominee for Governor in 1841
- Henry Hubbard, Democratic, former U.S. Senator
- Enos Stevens, Whig, former member of the Executive Council of New Hampshire, Whig nominee for Governor in 1840 and 1841
- John H. White, Independent Democrat, judge. Contemporary newspapers refer to White as a 'Conservative' candidate. White was supported by former Governor and owner of Hill's New Hampshire Patriot, Isaac Hill. White appears to have declined the nomination.

=== Results ===
1842 New Hampshire gubernatorial election (Note: Some sources give slightly different results. The result given is taken from the New Hampshire Senate Journal.)
Party	Candidate	Votes	%	±%
Democratic	Henry Hubbard	26,831	55.78%	
Whig	Enos Stevens	12,234	25.43%	
Independent Democrat	John H. White	5,869	12.20%	
Liberty	Daniel Hoit	2,812	5.85%	
Scattering		358	0.74%	
Majority		14,597	30.34%	
Turnout		48,104		
Democratic hold		Swing		

== Bibliography ==
- Connolly, Michael J. (2003). Capitalism, Politics, and Railroads in Jacksonian New England. Columbia, Missouri: University of Missouri Press. ISBN 0-8262-1499-1.
