= List of elections in 1834 =

The following elections occurred in the year 1834.

== Europe ==
=== Spain ===
- 1834 Spanish general election

=== France ===
- 1834 French legislative election

== North America ==
=== United States ===
- 1834 United States elections

==== United States Senate ====
- 1834 and 1835 United States Senate elections
- 1834 United States Senate special election in Pennsylvania

==== United States House of Representatives ====
- 1834 United States House of Representatives elections

==== United States lieutenant gubernatorial ====
- 1834 Connecticut lieutenant gubernatorial election
- 1834 Illinois lieutenant gubernatorial election

==== United States gubernatorial ====
- 1834 Connecticut gubernatorial election
- 1834 Illinois gubernatorial election
- 1834 Indiana gubernatorial election
- 1834 Louisiana gubernatorial election
- 1834 Maine gubernatorial election
- 1834 Maryland gubernatorial election
- 1833–34 Massachusetts gubernatorial election
- 1834 Massachusetts gubernatorial election
- 1834 New Hampshire gubernatorial election
- 1834 New Jersey gubernatorial election
- 1834 New York gubernatorial election
- 1834 North Carolina gubernatorial election
- 1834 South Carolina gubernatorial election
- 1834 Ohio gubernatorial election
- 1834 Rhode Island gubernatorial election
- 1834 Vermont gubernatorial election
- 1834 Virginia gubernatorial election

==== United States mayoral elections ====
- 1834 Boston mayoral election
- 1834 New York City mayoral election

== See also ==
- Category:1834 elections
