= 1839 New Hampshire gubernatorial election =

- March 12, 1839
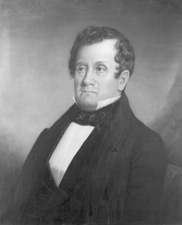

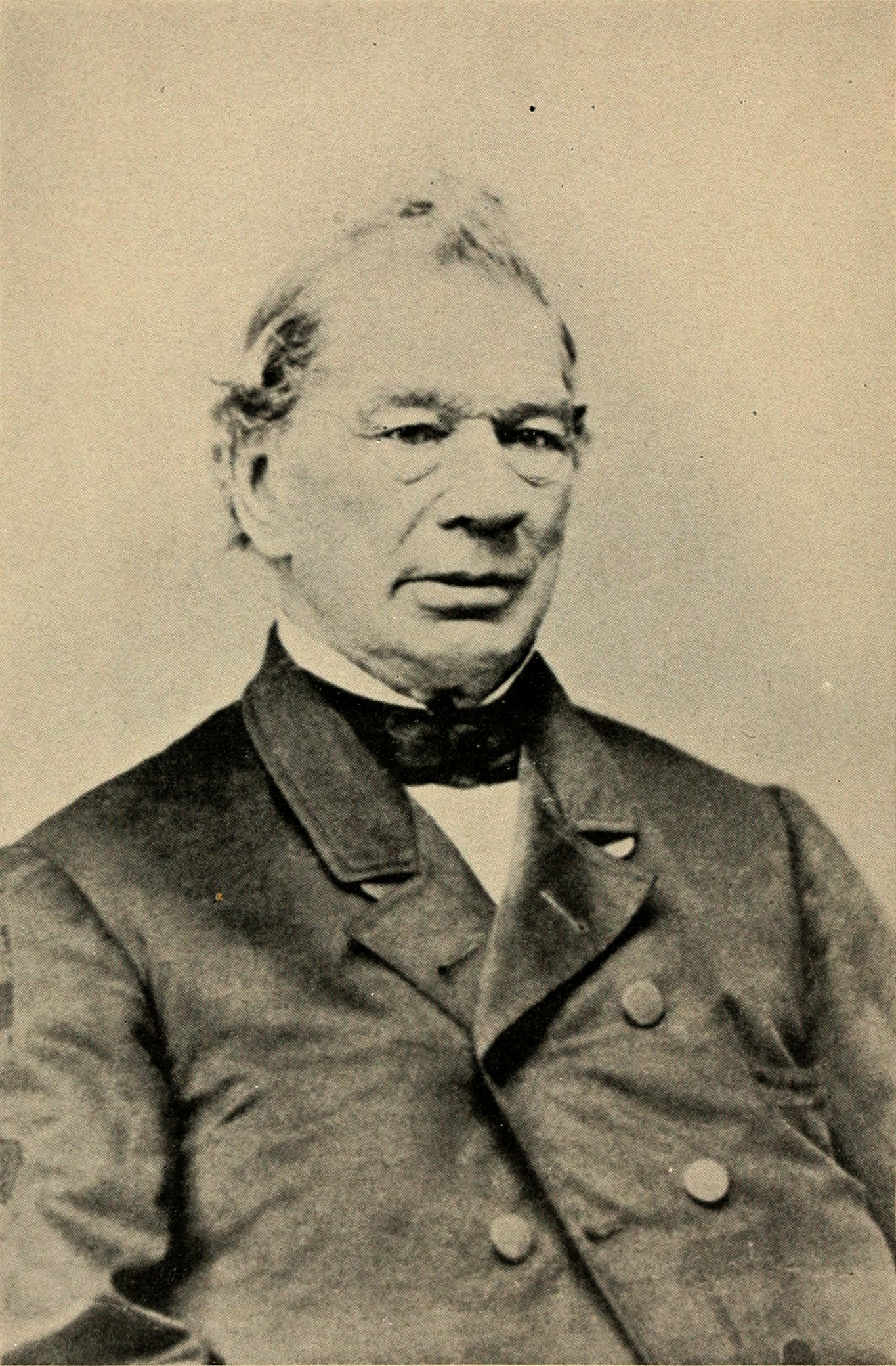
Nominee	John Page	James Wilson II
Party	Democratic	Whig
Popular vote	30,518	23,928
Percentage	55.89%	43.82%
- County results Page: 50–60% 60–70% 70–80% Wilson: 60–70%
Governor before election
Isaac Hill
Democratic
Elected Governor
John Page
Democratic

The 1839 New Hampshire gubernatorial election was held on March 12, 1839.

Incumbent Democratic Governor Isaac Hill did not stand for re-election.

Democratic nominee John Page defeated Whig nominee James Wilson II with 55.89% of the vote.

Wilson was cross-endorsed on the Independent ticket sponsored by the New Hampshire Anti-Slavery Society and the abolitionist Herald of Freedom, which contributed 1,800 votes to his total.

== General election ==
=== Candidates ===
- John Page, Democratic, former U.S. Senator
- James Wilson II, Whig, former Speaker of the New Hampshire House of Representatives, Whig nominee for Governor in 1838

=== Results ===
1839 New Hampshire gubernatorial election (Note: Some sources give slightly different results. The result given is taken from the New Hampshire Senate Journal.)
Party	Candidate	Votes	%	±%
Democratic	John Page	30,518	55.89%	
Whig	James Wilson II	23,928	43.82%	
Scattering		155	0.28%	
Majority		6,590	12.07%	
Turnout		54,601		
Democratic hold		Swing		
