= Senator Badger =

Senator Badger may refer to:

- George Edmund Badger (1795–1866), U.S. senator from North Carolina
- William Badger (1779–1852), New Hampshire State Senate
