= Joseph Healy =

American politician

Member of the U.S. House of Representatives from New Hampshire's At large district
- In office March 4, 1825 – March 3, 1829
- Preceded by: William Plumer, Jr.
- Succeeded by: Henry Hubbard

Member of the New Hampshire Senate
- In office 1824

Personal details
- Born: August 21, 1776 Newton, Middlesex County; Massachusetts, USA
- Died: October 10, 1861 (aged 85) Washington, Sullivan County; New Hampshire, USA
- Resting place: Old Cemetery; Washington, Sullivan County; New Hampshire, USA
- Party: Adams Party
- Spouse(s): Ruth Jaquith Healy; Sally Copeland Healy
- Children: Harvey Healy; Clara Healy; Louisa Healy; John Plummer Healy; Langdon Healy; Sullivan Wight Healy
- Parent(s): John Healy; Mary Wight Healy
- Profession: Farmer; Hotel Keeper; Politician

Joseph Healy (August 21, 1776 – October 10, 1861) was an American politician, farmer, innkeeper, and a United States representative from New Hampshire.

== Early life ==
Born in Newton, Middlesex County, Massachusetts, Healy completed his preparatory studies, and worked at farming and as an inn keeper.

== Career ==
Healy became a member of the New Hampshire Senate in 1824.

Elected by a 4,000 majority over Federalist, Ezekiel Webster, as an Adams candidate to the Nineteenth and Twentieth Congresses, Healy served as a United States representative from the state of New Hampshire from (March 4, 1825 – March 3, 1829).

After leaving Congress, Healy was a member of the New Hampshire Executive Council from 1829 to 1832. He resumed agricultural pursuits and the hotel business.

== Death ==
Healy died in Washington, Sullivan County, New Hampshire on October 10, 1861 (age 85 years, 50 days). He is interred at Old Cemetery, Washington, New Hampshire.

== Family life ==
Son of John Healy and Mary Wight Healy, he married Ruth Jaquith on December 21, 1801, and their son, Harvey was born December 24, 1802. After her death on June 19, 1807, he married Sally Copeland on February 2, 1808, and they had two daughters, Clara and Louisa; and three sons, John Plummer Healy, Langdon Healy, and Sullivan Wight Healy.

Party political offices
First	Whig nominee for Governor of New Hampshire; 1835, 1836, 1837	Succeeded by James Wilson II
U.S. House of Representatives
Preceded by William Plumer, Jr.	Member of the U.S. House of Representatives from New Hampshire's at-large congressional district 1825-1829	Succeeded by Henry Hubbard
