= Sarah A. Colby =

American physician

Dr. Sarah Ann Colby
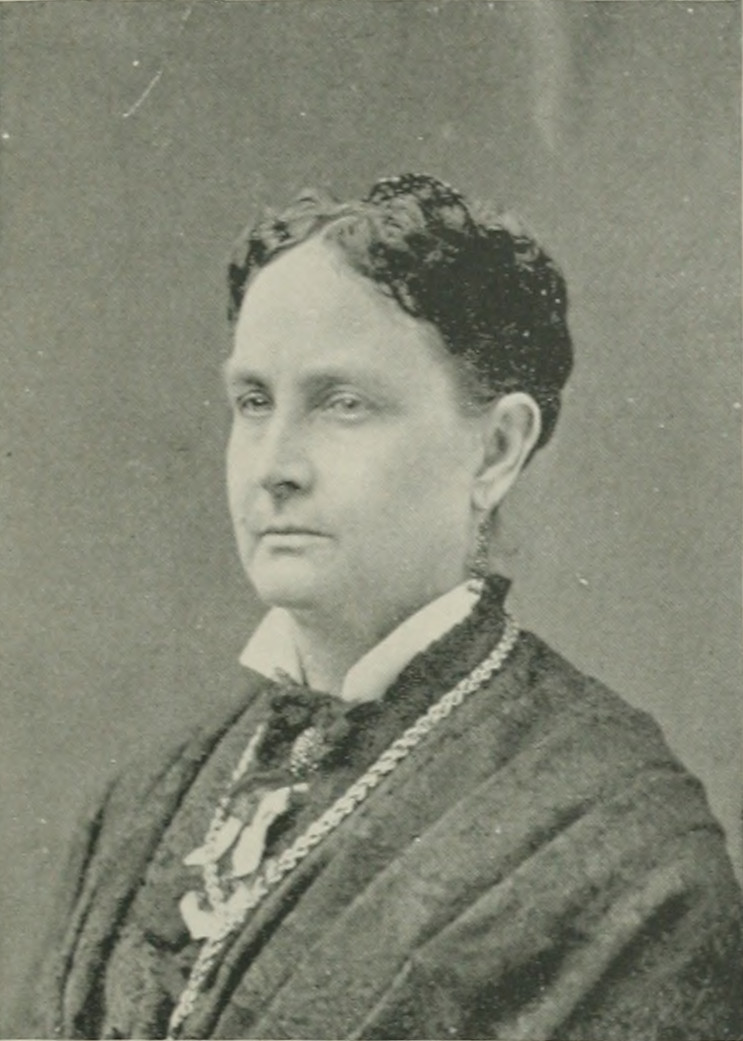
- Portrait from A Woman of the Century
- Born: May 31, 1824; Sanbornton, New Hampshire, U.S.
- Died: April 18, 1904 (aged 79); Dorchester, Boston, Massachusetts, U.S.
- Occupation: physician
- Relatives: Dr. Esther W. Taylor (sister)
- Medical career
- Field: Allopathic medicine; Eclectic medicine, Homeopathic medicine
- Sub-specialties: gynaecology

Sarah A. Colby (May 31, 1824 – April 18, 1904) was an American physician. The first ten years were given to family practice, and the remaining ones to office practice, except in cases of special favor. She practice allopathic medicine, eclectic medicine, and homeopathic medicine at different times in her career.

== Early life and education ==
Sarah Ann Colby was born in Sanbornton, New Hampshire, May 31, 1824. Her parents were Ebenezer Colby (1793-1871) and Sally (Blodgett) Colby (1793-1883). Sarah was one of nine children, the other siblings being Jackson (1815-1867), Vashti (1819-1839), Sarah Ann (1820-1821), Amos Blodgett (1822-1851), Esther Woodman (1826-1904), Ebenezer Converse (1829-1865), Amanda (1833-1869), and Andrew (1840-deceased). Of these, only Sarah and Esther survived.

Colby was educated in the public schools of her native town and the Woodman Sanbornton Academy in Sanbornton Square.

== Career ==
After leaving school she taught for some time, but failing health compelled her to give up that work. She returned to her home and remained there until her health was improved. During her illness, she realized the great need of women physicians, and she became much interested in studying to meet the exigencies of her own condition. After her health improved considerably, she went to Lowell, Massachusetts, where she opened a variety and fancy goods store, continuing the study of medicine and prescribing for many who called upon her. Concluding to make the practice of medicine her life work, she sold her store.

Colby studied in Philadelphia, and, after graduation, was at first an allopath, but eclectic in practice.

She located for practice in Manchester, New Hampshire, where she was received by the public and by some of the physicians with great cordiality.

Colby gained a large and lucrative practice, which kept her there nine years, when, desiring a larger field, she removed to Boston, Massachusetts. One object of her removal was to give her whole attention to gynecology. Colby was one of the first women physicians in Boston, and she did well there. She was called to meet in consultation, in the large cities of New England, some of the most scientific men physicians of the era. In the first fifteen years of her professional experience, she was eclectic in practice, but after her sister entered the Hahnemann Medical College of Chicago, Colby took up the study of medicine of that school, and for fifteen years thereafter, homeopathy was her mode of treatment.

While engaged in her practice, her health did not permit her to give her entire time to professional duties. Colby's partner in medical practice was her sister, Dr. Esther W. Taylor. Taylor graduated from the Homœopathic Medical College of Chicago in 1872. In 1875, she became a member of the American Institute of Homœopathy and the Homœopathic State Medical Society of Illinois. She had a large and successful practice in Freeport, Illinois.

== Death ==
Colby died at Dorchester, Boston, April 18, 1904.
