= Woodman Sanbornton Academy =

- Sanbornton Square Historic District, Sanbornton, New Hampshire, U.S.

Information
- Type: boarding school
- Established: 1826
- Founder: Aaron Woodman
- Closed: 1857
- Authority: Board of Trustees
- Gender: coeducational

Woodman Sanbornton Academy was a coeducational boarding school in Sanbornton, New Hampshire, now a part of the Sanbornton Square Historic District. The site of the building was near the location of what later became the Congregational meeting house. The institution was named for Aaron Woodman and was incorporated on June 27, 1826. The first preceptor was David L. Nichols, in 1826, and the last, Albert P. Whittemore, in 1858.

The school's last term was held 1857, and thereafter, the building was left in a dilapidated condition. In 1867, the Sanbornton school district bought and repaired the building so that it could be used again as a school, the upper floor being furnished as a hall.

== Early history ==
The school received its name from Aaron Woodman (1790-1826), youngest son of Rev. Joseph Woodman, who, being a prosperous merchant in Boston, gave liberally for its building and endowment, but suddenly died in little more than a month after the Act of its incorporation was approved at Concord, New Hampshire, June 27, 1826. This Act was signed by Henry Hubbard and Matthew Harvey. By the provisions of the same, Hon. Nathan Taylor and Revs. Abraham Bodwell and John Crockett of Sanbornton, Rev. William Patrick of Canterbury, Jeremiah II Woodman of Rochester, Aaron Woodman of Boston, Drs. Benaiah Sanborn and Thomas P. Hill, Jonathan Moore, Abel Kimball, Jesse Ingalls, and Peter Hersey, all of Sanbornton, were made a body politic by the name of the "Trustees of the Woodman Sanbornton Academy". They were allowed to hold real estate, with an annual income of not over US$500, and personal estate not exceeding US$10,000; were to elect their own officers and fill vacancies in their Board.

In 1826, the academy was established at Sanbornton, where a building for that purpose already stood. This building had been raised and mostly completed the year before, land having been leased for that purpose by Dr. Sanborn, extending south to within 6 feet (1.8 m) or 8 feet (2.4 m) of a Congregational meeting house. David Lane was remembered to have stood upon the topmost timbers of the cupola, nailing on the caps, while his friend Charles Lane was worried for Lane's safety on the ground below. David L. Nichols had evidently been teacher prior to the meeting of the trustees, August 10, 1826, as a committee was then chosen to get Mr. Nichols's terms for continuing the school. He promised to do so nine months from that date, himself furnishing needful assistants, receiving all the tuition and the interest on the funds for one year, while the trustees were to furnish fuel during the inclement season. The Constitution and By-Laws were presented at a meeting held in Abel Kimball's inn (late Boutwell House), Sept. 15, 1826, providing that:—

"No person shall be employed as teacher who is not a professor of religion, of exemplary manners, good natural abilities, and literary and scientific acquirements; of good acquaintance with human nature, and of a natural aptitude for instruction and government, without preference of kindred or friends, place of birth, education, or residence." It was made obligatory on the teachers "to open and close the school with prayer; have some portion of the sacred Scriptures read each day by the pupils; also to regulate the tempers, enlarge the minds, and form the morals of the youth committed to their charge; also, to look after the health of the scholars, and urge the importance of habits of industry and application. . . . The teachers must also inculcate the fundamental principles of the Christian religion, and the great and important Christian doctrines [which are stated at some length in the Constitution], as found in the creeds of the evangelical churches.” The By-Laws were some of them strict in their nature, the "students not being allowed to indulge in profane swearing, any species of gambling, or intemperance, and being forbidden to associate with any persons of bad morals, or to frequent grog-shops or taverns." Article 8 reads, "Each student shall attend public worship on every Sabbath, or give a satisfactory excuse for not attending"; and Article 12, "No scholar shall be allowed to attend a dancing school while a member of the Academy" [though this was afterwards modified in its form, referring only to "minors, without consent of their parents"].

The academy building was painted in 1829, at an expense of US$35. Available funds of the institution, November 1830, reported at US$802, and then being slowly increased by annuities paid by the trustees and others, usually US$3 each, - none being more constant in such payments than Rev. Mr. Crockett. The bell, still heard in 1881 from the Congregational meeting-house, was procured in 1830, succeeding a smaller one, of 200 pounds weight, previously used, Holbrook's "apparatus", purchased in 1831 for US$10. At a special meeting of the trustees in 1835, it was voted to "take immediate measures to build a female seminary"; but not executed. Anonymous letters, received by Josiah Webster, keeper of the boarding-house, 1840, were at last fastened upon two of the students, and resulted in their suspension.

== Annual meetings ==
At the second annual meeting, November 1, 1826, Hon. Nathan Taylor was elected president; Dr. B. Sanborn, vice-president; Rev A. Bodwell, clerk. At nearly all the following nineteen annual meetings, the Constitution and By-Laws were read. The meetings were held at Mr. Bodwell's, 1828; Daniel Sanborn's inn, 1831; Joseph Lane's inn, 1835; Hon. Nathan Taylor's, 1836.

Parker Noyes, Esq., of Salisbury, was elected trustee, 1826, in place of Aaron Woodman, deceased. Charles Gilman, Esq. (lawyer in Sanbornton), in place of Abel Kimball, 1828. Charles Lane, vice Parker Noyes, 1830; Joseph Woodman, Esq. vice Jeremiah Woodman, Esq, 1833; Thomas R. Greenleaf, Esq., vice Charles Gilman, Esq., 1834; Capt. Chase Perkins and Eliphalet Ordway elected 1835; Daniel Sanborn (rice his father, Dr. B. Sanborn), and George W. Crockett of Boston, elected 1836; Dr. E. K. Webster, of Hill, elected 1839; Bartlett Hill, Esq., Bracket L. Johnston, and Simeon Sanborn, all of Sanbornton, in 1840. At the twelfth annual meeting, 1836, Hon. Nathan Taylor resigned the office of president, receiving a vote of thanks, and Rev. William Patrick was chosen president in his place, and Capt. C. other officers. Perkins vice-president. Capt. Perkins, president, 1838; Col. Daniel Sanborn, president, 1839; Rev. William Patrick re-elected, 1840–43, and Rev. A. Bodwell chosen secretary for the nineteenth time, Nov. 1, 1843: from which date, though the meeting stood adjourned to the first Wednesday of November, 1844. No further records were found.

== Later years ==
The Catalogue for the year ending November 24, 1840, was, for those times, a creditable pamphlet of 18 pages, printed in Sanbornton, by J. C. Wilson. Total number of students, 180; male department, 109; female department, 71. Thirty-eight of the number - ten girls — had attended to Latin or Greek, or both; four (girls) had studied the French language; and one (girl) the Italian language. The executive committee of the trustees announced their prospects for the coming year, winter term to commence Wednesday, December 2, with undiminished confidence in their preceptor, Dyer H. Sanborn, A. M.. The success of the institution, since it had been under his charge, surpassed their highest expectations. The boarding-house was about to come under the care of Mr. Noah G. Smith, who was highly recommended for that position. The price of board was to be eight shillings a week, including washing, and exclusive of wood and lights; with tuition, US$3.50 a quarter. The two literary societies, titled the "Literary Panoplean", and the "Mercurean Loquendi", were also commended. The Analytical Grammar, prepared by the principal, having already passed through three editions, was favored with a long advertising card.

== Final disposal of the building ==
But with the decay of the "Square", the academy gradually diminished in patronage and efficiency. Its limited funds soon became exhausted in the support of the school and the outlay for the boarding-house. The last academy term was in 1857. In 1865, the building had been left in quite a forlorn condition, no one apparently interested in its welfare, clapboards loose; glass broken; occasionally used for dancing. But early in 1867, the school district at the Square obtained the control of the building, for a nominal sum, from the few remaining shareholders then living or accessible, repaired the whole outside, and converted the lower story into a commodious school-room, which was first occupied by a dedicatory religious meeting, Sabbath evening, May 19, the first district school commencing under Miss Sarah Taylor the following day. The upper room, being finished and furnished with settees by a subscription of the citizens, became a public hall for the parish and townspeople generally, the ladies of the Congregational society having prior claim to its occasional use for their social gatherings, by virtue of a small rent paid to the district. The cupola was repaired and painted in 1879 by a subscription raised chiefly among the citizens of the neighborhood.

== Notable alumni ==
- Sarah A. Colby
- Mary Baker Eddy
