= James Wilson I (New Hampshire politician) =

American politician

James Wilson

Member of the U.S. House of Representatives from New Hampshire's at-large district
- In office March 4, 1809 – March 3, 1811
- Preceded by: Clement Storer
- Succeeded by: George Sullivan

Personal details
- Born: August 15, 1766 Peterborough, New Hampshire, U.S.
- Died: January 4, 1839 (aged 72) Keene, New Hampshire, U.S.
- Party: Federalist
- Children: James Wilson II
- Education: Harvard University

James Wilson (August 16, 1766 – January 4, 1839) was a U.S. representative from New Hampshire, father of James Wilson II.

Born in Peterborough, New Hampshire, Wilson attended Phillips Academy, Andover, Massachusetts, and graduated from Harvard University in 1789. He studied law and was admitted to the bar in 1792, commencing practice in Peterborough. He served as member of the State House of Representatives between 1803–1808 and 1812–1814.

Wilson was elected as a Federalist to the Eleventh Congress (March 4, 1809 – March 3, 1811). He was not a candidate for renomination in 1810 and resumed the practice of law, moving to Keene, New Hampshire, in 1815.

He died in Keene, January 4, 1839, and was interred in Woodland Cemetery.

U.S. House of Representatives
Preceded by Clement Storer	Member of the U.S. House of Representatives from New Hampshire's at-large congressional district 1809-1811	Succeeded by George Sullivan
