= James Wilson II =

American politician

James Wilson
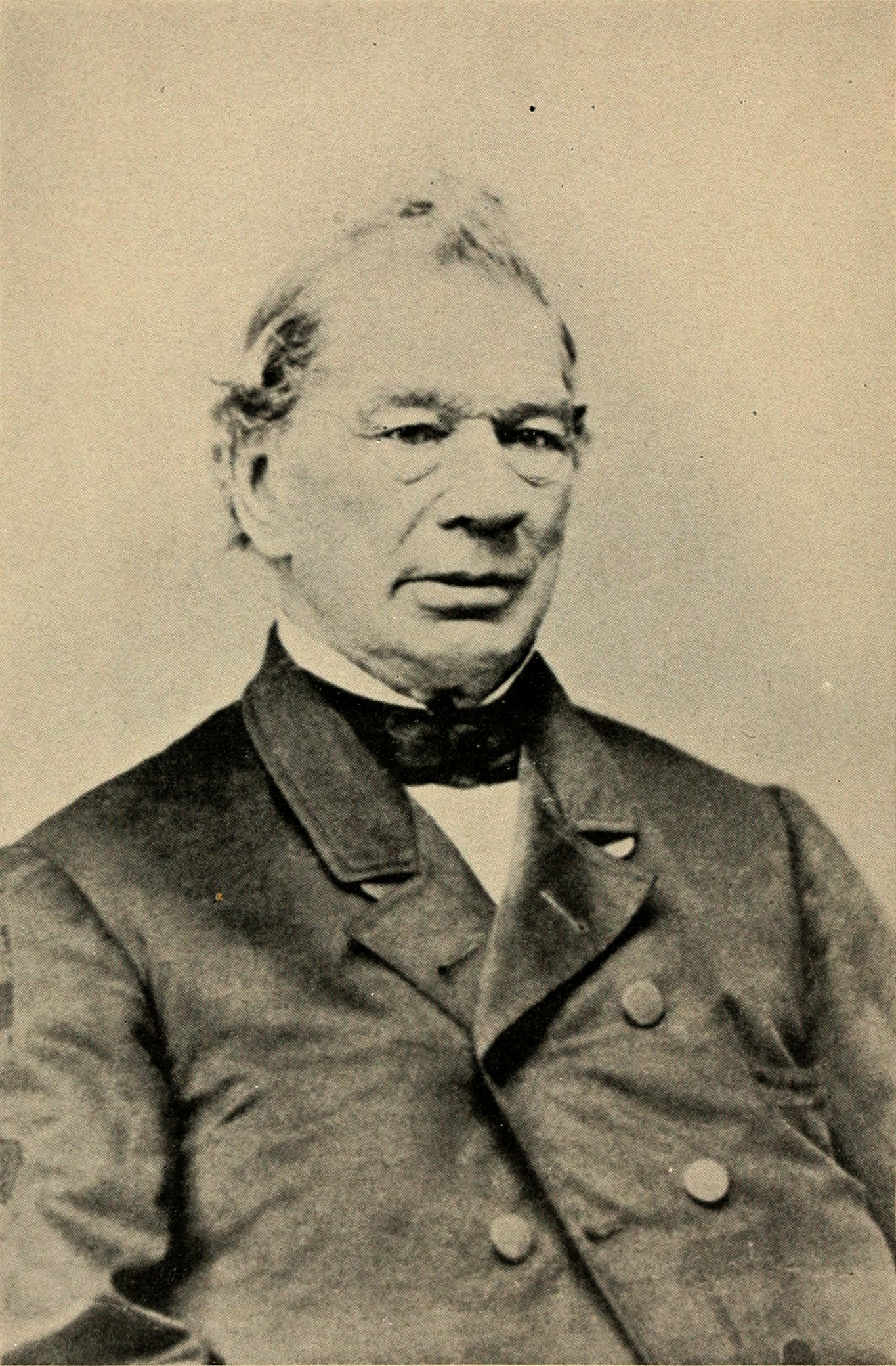

Member of the U.S. House of Representatives from New Hampshire's 3rd district
- In office March 4, 1847 – September 9, 1850
- Preceded by: District established
- Succeeded by: George W. Morrison

Speaker of the New Hampshire House of Representatives
- In office 1828–1829
- Preceded by: Henry Hubbard
- Succeeded by: James B. Thornton

Member of the New Hampshire House of Representatives
- In office 1825–1837, 1840, 1846, 1871–1872

Personal details
- Born: March 18, 1797 Peterborough, New Hampshire, U.S.
- Died: May 29, 1881 (aged 84) Keene, New Hampshire, U.S.
- Party: Whig
- Spouse: Mary Low Richardson
- Relations: Mary Elizabeth Wilson Sherwood
- Children: 7
- Parent: James Wilson I (father)

James Wilson II (March 18, 1797 – May 29, 1881) was a U.S. representative from New Hampshire.

== Early life and education ==
Born in Peterborough, New Hampshire, James Wilson II attended New Ipswich Academy and the academies at Atkinson and Exeter. He moved with his parents to Keene, New Hampshire, in 1815, and graduated from Middlebury College in Vermont in 1820.

== Career ==
Wilson served as member of the New Hampshire State militia 1820-1840 and was successively promoted from captain to major general. A law student, he was admitted to the bar in 1823 and commenced practice in Keene. He served as member of the New Hampshire House of Representatives 1825–1837, 1840, and 1846, and served as Speaker in 1828. He was an unsuccessful candidate for governor in 1835 and 1838. He served as delegate to the Whig National Convention in 1840 and was Surveyor general of public lands in the Territories of Wisconsin and Iowa 1841–1845.

Wilson was elected as a Whig to the Thirtieth and Thirty-first Congresses and served from March 4, 1847, to September 9, 1850, when he resigned. Politically, he was considered a "lackey" of Daniel Webster.

He served as chairman of the Committee on Expenditures in the Post Office Department (Thirtieth Congress). He was appointed one of the land claim commissioners for California in 1851 and served in this capacity until 1853. He settled in San Francisco and remained there until 1867, when he returned to Keene, New Hampshire. He was again a member of the New Hampshire House of Representatives in 1871 and 1872.

== Personal life and death ==
He was the son of James Wilson, who also served in the United States House of Representatives.

Wilson and his wife, Mary Low Wilson (née Richardson), had seven children. Their eldest daughter was Mary Elizabeth Sherwood.

He died in Keene, New Hampshire on May 29, 1881, aged 84, and was interred in Woodland Cemetery.

U.S. House of Representatives
Preceded by New Hampshire's at-large congressional district	U.S. Representative for the 3rd district of New Hampshire; March 4, 1847 – September 9, 1850	Succeeded by George W. Morrison
Party political offices
Preceded by Joseph Healy	Whig nominee for Governor of New Hampshire; 1838, 1839	Succeeded by Enos Stevens
Political offices
Preceded by Henry Hubbard	Speaker of the New Hampshire House of Representatives; 1828–1829	Succeeded by James B. Thornton
