= 1835 New Hampshire gubernatorial election =

- March 10, 1835
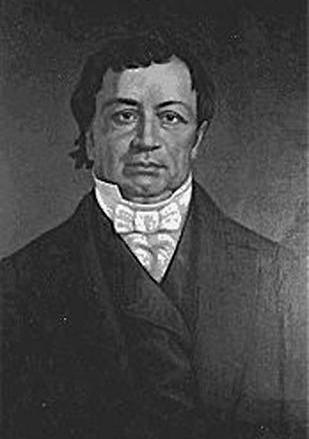

Nominee	William Badger	Joseph Healy
Party	Democratic	Whig
Popular vote	25,767	14,825
Percentage	63.00%	36.25%
- County results Badger: 60–70% 70–80% Healy: 50–60%
Governor before election
William Badger
Democratic
Elected Governor
William Badger
Democratic

The 1835 New Hampshire gubernatorial election was held on March 10, 1835.

Incumbent Democratic Governor William Badger defeated Whig nominee Joseph Healy with 63.00% of the vote.

== General election ==
=== Candidates ===
- William Badger, Democratic, incumbent Governor
- Joseph Healy, Whig, innkeeper, former U.S. Representative. Healy was nominated in place of Andrew Pierce, who declined the Whig nomination.

=== Results ===
1835 New Hampshire gubernatorial election (Note: Some sources give the result as Badger 23,709, Healy 13,707. The result given is taken from the New Hampshire Senate Journal.)
Party	Candidate	Votes	%	±%
Democratic	William Badger (incumbent)	25,767	63.00%	
Whig	Joseph Healy	14,825	36.25%	
Scattering		308	0.75%	
Majority		10,942	26.75%	
Turnout		40,900		
Democratic hold		Swing		
