= Clement Storer =

American politician (1760–1830)

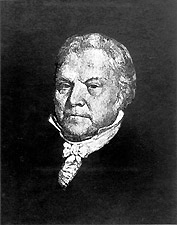

Member of the U.S. House of Representatives from New Hampshire's at-large district
- In office March 4, 1807 – March 3, 1809
- Preceded by: Thomas W. Thompson
- Succeeded by: James Wilson

United States Senator from New Hampshire
- In office June 27, 1817 – March 3, 1819
- Preceded by: Jeremiah Mason
- Succeeded by: John F. Parrott

Member of the New Hampshire House of Representatives
- In office 1810–1812

Personal details
- Born: September 20, 1760 Kennebunk, Massachusetts Bay, British America (now Maine)
- Died: November 21, 1830 (aged 70) Portsmouth, New Hampshire, U.S.
- Party: Democratic-Republican

Clement Storer (September 20, 1760 – November 21, 1830) was a United States representative and senator from New Hampshire. Born in Kennebunk in Massachusetts Bay's Province of Maine, he completed preparatory studies, studied medicine in Portsmouth, New Hampshire and in Europe, engaged in the practice of medicine in Portsmouth, and was captain of militia and held successive ranks to that of major general.

Storer was a member of the New Hampshire House of Representatives from 1810 to 1812, serving one year as speaker. He was elected as a Democratic-Republican to the Tenth Congress (March 4, 1807 to March 3, 1809). He was elected as a Democratic-Republican to the U.S. Senate to fill the vacancy caused by the resignation of Jeremiah Mason and served from June 27, 1817, to March 4, 1819; while in the Senate he was chairman of the Committee on the Militia (Fifteenth Congress).

From 1818 to 1824, Storer was high sheriff of Rockingham County. He died in Portsmouth in 1830 and was interred in North Cemetery.

U.S. House of Representatives
Preceded by Caleb Ellis	Member of the U.S. House of Representatives from New Hampshire's at-large congressional district 1807-1809	Succeeded by James Wilson
U.S. Senate
Preceded by Jeremiah Mason	U.S. senator (Class 3) from New Hampshire; 1817–1819; Served alongside: David L. Morril	Succeeded by John F. Parrott
