= William Plumer Jr. =

American politician (1789–1854)

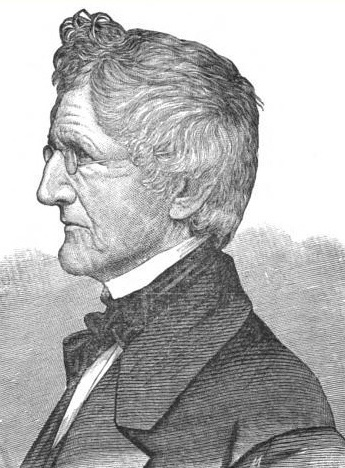
- From the March–April 1899 edition of The Granite State Monthly magazine

Member of the United States House of Representatives from New Hampshire's at-large congressional district
- In office March 4, 1819 – March 3, 1825
- Preceded by: John F. Parrott
- Succeeded by: Joseph Healy

Personal details
- Born: February 9, 1789 Epping, New Hampshire, U.S.
- Died: September 18, 1854 (aged 65) Epping, New Hampshire, U.S.
- Resting place: Plumer Family Burial Ground, Epping, New Hampshire
- Party: Democratic-Republican; Adams-Clay Republican
- Spouse: Margaret Mead Frost (m. 1820–1854, his death)
- Relations: William Plumer (father)
- Children: 3
- Education: Harvard College
- Profession: Attorney

William Plumer Jr. (February 9, 1789 – September 18, 1854) was an American politician, attorney, and writer from New Hampshire. He was most notable for his service in the United States House of Representatives from 1819 to 1825.

== Biography ==
Plumer was born in Epping, New Hampshire on February 7, 1789, a son of Sarah (nee Fowler) Plumer and William Plumer. He attended Phillips Exeter Academy and graduated from Harvard College in 1809. Plumer then studied law with his father, attained admission to the bar in 1812, and commenced practice in Epping.

In 1816, Plumer was appointed a United States loan commissioner for New Hampshire, and he served until 1817. He was a member of the New Hampshire House of Representatives in 1818.

In 1818, Plumer was elected as a Democratic-Republican to the Sixteenth Congress. He was reelected to the Seventeenth Congress in 1820, and as a Adams-Clay Republican he won reelection to the Eighteenth Congress in 1822. He served from March 4, 1819 to March 3, 1825 and was acting chairman of the Judiciary Committee in the Seventeenth Congress, following the January 1823 resignation of Representative Hugh Nelson, who had been appointed U.S. Minister to Spain.

After leaving Congress, Plumer resumed practicing law. He was a member of the New Hampshire Senate from 1827 to 1828. He served as delegate to the New Hampshire state constitutional convention in 1850. Plumer authored several works in his later years, including a biography of his father that was published in 1857 and a book of religious-themed poetry, 1846's Lyrica Sacra.

Plumer died in Epping on September 18, 1854. He was interred in the burial ground on the family estate near Epping.

== Family ==
In 1820, Plumer married Margaret Mead Frost. They were the parents of three children—Mary Elizabeth (b. 1822), William (1823–1896), and Sarah Adeline (1826–1828).

U.S. House of Representatives
Preceded by John F. Parrott	Member of the U.S. House of Representatives from New Hampshire's at-large congressional district 1819–1825	Succeeded by Joseph Healy
