= Mary Elizabeth Wilson Sherwood =

American author and socialite

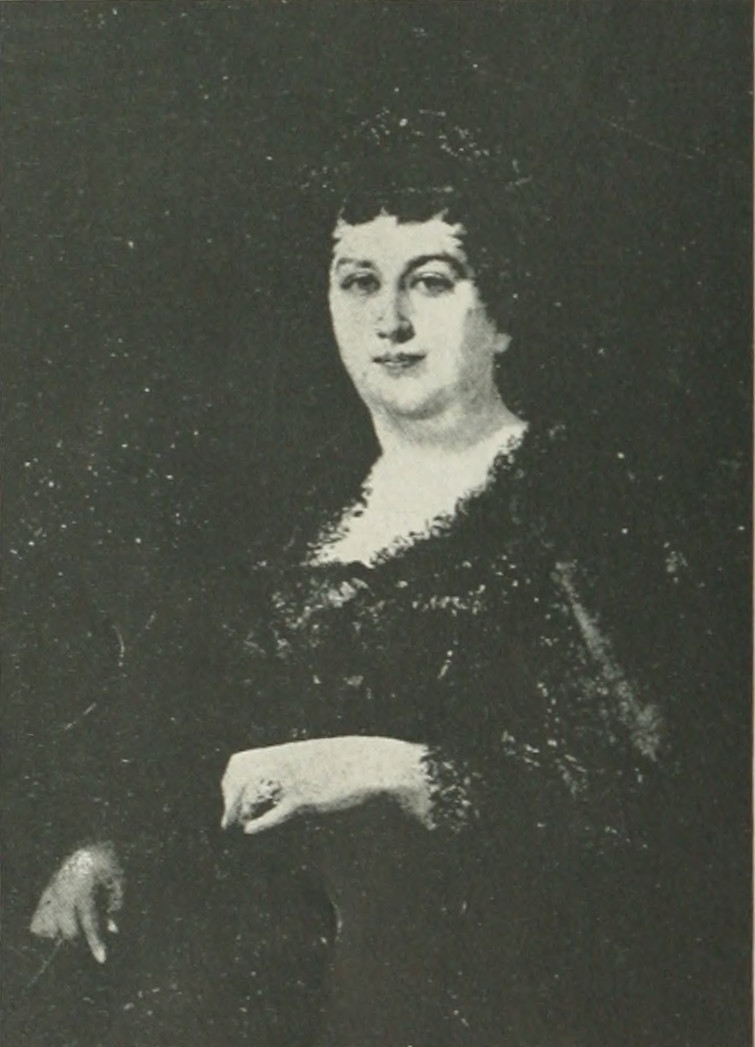
- Born: Mary Elizabeth Wilson; October 27, 1826; Keene, New Hampshire, U.S.
- Died: August 12, 1903 (aged 76); New York, New York, U.S.
- Occupation: Author
- Spouse: John Sherwood (m. 1851 – 1894/1895; his death)
- Children: 4

Mary Elizabeth Sherwood (pen names: M. E. W. S., M.E.W. Sherwood, Mrs. John Sherwood; nee Wilson; October 27, 1826 – September 12, 1903) was an American author and socialite. She wrote short stories, poetry, several books, and etiquette manuals, in addition to contributing to many magazines and translating poems from European languages. Among her writings are The Sarcasm of Destiny, A Transplanted Rose, Manners and Social Usages, Sweet Briar, and Roxobel. Better known as Mrs. John Sherwood, some of her literary works were published as "M.E.W.S." or "M.E.W. Sherwood".

Sherwood gave readings in parlors for charitable objects, making selections from her own works, and made eight trips to Europe. She was decorated with the insignia of Officier d'Academie.

== Early years and education ==
Mary Elizabeth ("Lizzie") Wilson was born in Keene, New Hampshire, October 27, 1826. (Note: According to Aldrich (1991) and Fletcher & Bowker (1904), Sherwood was born in 1830.) She was the eldest daughter of Gen. James Wilson II, a member of Congress from New Hampshire, and Mary Low (nee Richardson) Wilson. Mary had three younger brothers and three younger sisters.

When her father was in Congress, the family lived in Washington, D.C. Soon after his election, Mary's mother died, leaving her the responsibility of taking care of the large family. She was intelligent, received a thorough education, and was acquainted with George Bancroft, John Lothrop Motley, William Cullen Bryant, William H. Prescott, and others. Her first literary work, at the age of seventeen, was an essay on the "Novel of Jane Eyre" sent to the New-York Tribune in 1848, which attracted much friendly criticism.

== Family ==
On November 12, 1851, while living in Washington, D.C., she married John Sherwood, a lawyer from New York City, who died in 1894 or 1895.

Their family consisted of four sons. James Wilson Sherwood died in infancy. John Philip Sherwood died at the age of 24. Samuel Sherwood became an artist. Arthur Murray Sherwood, the broker, was the father of Robert E. Sherwood, playwright, editor, and screenwriter.

== Career ==
Sherwood's literary work included correspondence with eminent men and women abroad, and many contributions to the Atlantic Monthly, Harper's Bazaar, Scribner's Magazine, Appletons' Journal, the New York Tribune, The New York Times, the New York World, and Frank Leslie's Weekly. For years, she was a correspondent for the Boston Traveller. Her work in journals, from Maine to Oregon, would fill many volumes. Among her published books were The Sarcasm of Destiny (New York, 1877); Home Amusements (1881); Amenities of Home (1881); A Transplanted Rose (1882); Manners and Social Usages (1884); Royal Girls and Royal Courts (Boston, 1887); and Sweet Brier (Boston, 1889). She wrote many poems, to which she signed the initials, M.E.W.S., and translated some poems from European languages. She contributed some 300 short stories to various magazines and newspapers, many of which appeared anonymously.

For years, Sherwood traveled extensively in Europe. There, she formed the acquaintance of Queen Victoria, and had three interviews with Margherita of Savoy, the Queen of Italy. Among her many testimonials of recognition abroad, she was decorated with the insignia of Officier d'Academie, an honor conferred by the French Minister of Public Instruction on persons who distinguished themselves in literary pursuits. It is said to be the first time this decoration was conferred upon an American woman.

In 1883, the Sherwoods experienced financial losses which forced them to sell their home and furnishings in New York City.

In 1885, Sherwood gave readings in her home in aid of the Mount Vernon Fund, and they became so popular, that she continued them for several years, giving the proceeds to charity, realizing over US$10,000 in that way. Her readings comprised essays on travel, literature and history. Sherwood served as president of Causeries, a literary gathering of distinguished New York women, and she was a member of several benevolent societies.

In Sherwood's parlors hung the original drawings and paintings of her two artist sons. One was by Samuel, of his brother Philip, taken just before Philip's death; several were by Philip. In his name, Sherwood contributed to the funds of the Home for the Destitute Blind, the St. Joseph's Hospital, the Kindergarten for the Blind, the Woman's Exchange, the New York Diet Kitchen, the Manhattan Hospital and Dispensary, the Home of St. Elizabeth and various other schemes to care for children. She did much to advance literature and science in New York City.

She died suddenly at the Hotel Majestic, on Central Park West, between 71st and 72nd streets in Manhattan on September 12, 1903, aged 76.

== Selected works ==
- Metropolitan Fair, for the U.S. Sanitary Commission : Receiving depot, 2 Great Jones Street, New York, [blank] 1864. A great exhibition called the Metropolitan Fair, will be opened in the city of New York, March 28th, 1864. The proceeds of the sales to be for the benefit of the Sanitary Commission. ... (1864)
- The Sarcasm of Destiny or, Nina's experience (New York, 1877)
- Home Amusements (1881)
- Amenities of Home (1881)
- A Transplanted Rose : a story of New York society (1882)
- Uncle Archie’s Cane (1882)
- Manners and Social Usages (1884)
- Royal Girls and Royal Courts (Boston, 1887)
- Sweet Brier (Boston, 1889)
- Poems (1892)
- Washington before the war (1894)
- Joseph Smith and the Mormons ... (1897)
- An epistle to posterity (1897)
- Here & there & everywhere : reminiscences (1898)
- New York in the seventies (1898)
- Etiquette, the American code of manners : a study of the usages, laws, and observances which govern intercourse in the best circles of American society
- The Art of Entertaining
