= John F. Parrott =

American politician (1767–1836)

John Fabyan Parrott
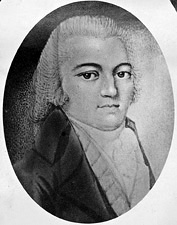

Member of the U.S. House of Representatives from New Hampshire's at-large district
- In office March 4, 1817 – March 3, 1819
- Preceded by: Jeduthun Wilcox
- Succeeded by: William Plumer, Jr.

United States Senator from New Hampshire
- In office March 4, 1819 – March 3, 1825
- Preceded by: Clement Storer
- Succeeded by: Levi Woodbury

Member of the New Hampshire House of Representatives
- In office 1809–1814

Personal details
- Born: August 8, 1767 Portsmouth, Province of New Hampshire, British America
- Died: July 9, 1836 (aged 68) Greenland, New Hampshire, U.S.
- Party: Democratic-Republican

John Fabyan Parrott (August 8, 1767 – July 9, 1836) was a United States representative and a senator from New Hampshire.

He was born in Portsmouth in the Province of New Hampshire to John Parrott, a merchant and ship captain, and his wife Deborah Walker. He followed his father's line of work and began trading in Europe and the Caribbean, something which stopped with the passing of the Embargo Act of 1807. Parrott was a member of the New Hampshire House of Representatives from 1809 to 1814 and also held various local offices. He was an unsuccessful candidate for election in 1812 to the Thirteenth Congress, but was elected to the U.S. House of Representatives for the Fifteenth Congress, serving from March 4, 1817, to March 3, 1819. He was then elected to the U.S. Senate and served from March 4, 1819, to March 3, 1825. He was a Democratic Republican (later Adams-Clay Republican).

Later, in 1826, he was the postmaster of Portsmouth. He was also a member of the New Hampshire Senate from 1830 to 1831. He died in Greenland, New Hampshire, and was interred in the family burying ground on the Parrott estate. His papers are kept at the University of North Carolina.

Parrott married Hannah Skilling (1770-1850). His sons included Parrott gun inventor Robert Parker Parrott (1804-1877), and Peter Pearse Parrott (1811-1896), partner in a Cold Spring, New York ordinance foundry.

U.S. House of Representatives
Preceded by Jeduthun Wilcox	Member of the U.S. House of Representatives from New Hampshire's at-large congressional district 1817–1819	Succeeded by William Plumer, Jr.
U.S. Senate
Preceded by Clement Storer	U.S. senator (Class 3) from New Hampshire; 1819–1825; Served alongside: David L. Morril, Samuel Bell	Succeeded by Levi Woodbury
