= 1841 New Hampshire gubernatorial election =

- March 9, 1841
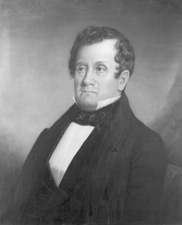

Nominee	John Page	Enos Stevens
Party	Democratic	Whig
Popular vote	29,116	21,230
Percentage	56.33%	41.07%
- County results Page: 50–60% 60–70% 70–80% Stevens: 50–60%
Governor before election
John Page
Democratic
Elected Governor
John Page
Democratic

The 1841 New Hampshire gubernatorial election was held on March 9, 1841.

Incumbent Democratic Governor John Page defeated Whig nominee Enos Stevens with 56.33% of the vote in a re-match of the previous year's election.

== General election ==
=== Candidates ===
- Daniel Hoit, Liberty, former State Senator
- John Page, Democratic, incumbent Governor
- Enos Stevens, Whig, former member of the Executive Council of New Hampshire, Whig nominee for Governor in 1840

=== Results ===
1841 New Hampshire gubernatorial election (Note: Some sources give slightly different results. The result given is taken from the New Hampshire Senate Journal.)
Party	Candidate	Votes	%	±%
Democratic	John Page (incumbent)	29,116	56.33%	
Whig	Enos Stevens	21,230	41.07%	
Liberty	Daniel Hoit	1,273	2.46%	
Scattering		70	0.14%	
Majority		7,886	15.26%	
Turnout		51,689		
Democratic hold		Swing		
