= Esther W. Taylor =

American physician (1826–1904)

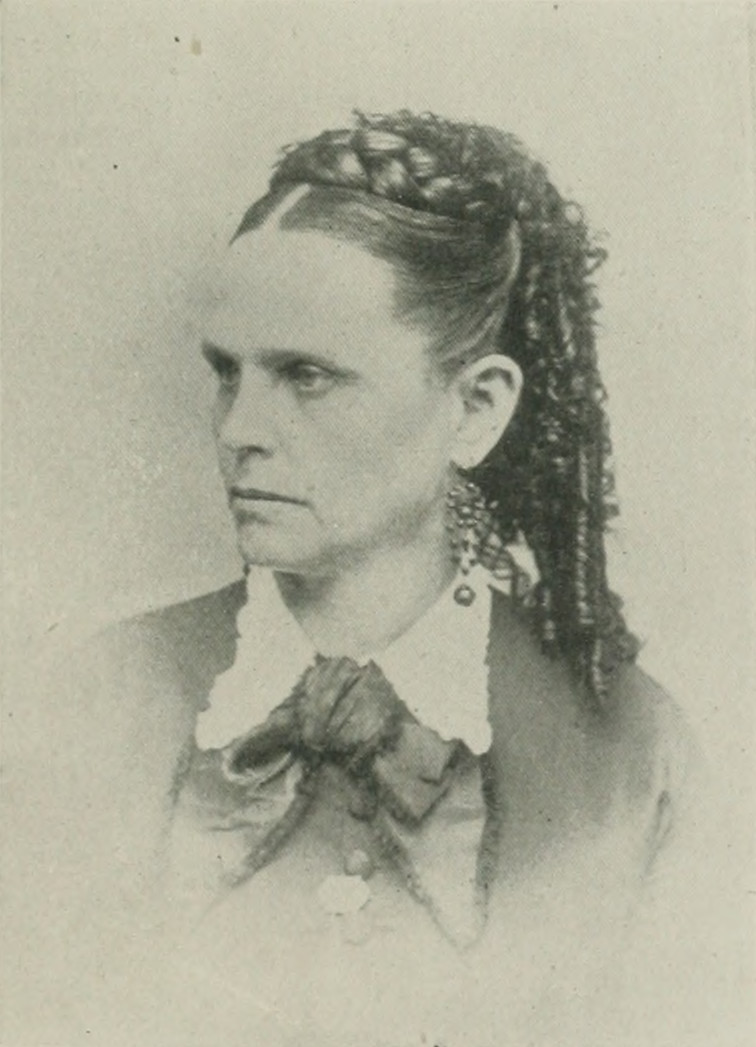
"A Woman of the Century"

Esther W. Taylor (April 16, 1826 – August 9, 1904) was an American physician, one of the earliest women physicians in New England.

== Biography ==
Esther Woodman Colby was born in Sanbornton, New Hampshire, April 16, 1826. Her parents were Ebenezer and Sally Colby. Eight children were born to those parents, of whom two survived, Dr. Esther and a sister, Dr. Sarah A. Colby, of Boston, Massachusetts.

Taylor received her education in the public schools of her native place and in Sanbornton Academy. After devoting some time to teaching in the public schools, she paid a visit to her brother in Boston, and there made the acquaintance of N. F. Taylor, whom she married on January 25, 1846. He was in the life insurance business. One child was born to them, a daughter, Vashti Colby Taylor (b. 1847).

In 1855, Mr. Taylor and his family removed to Minnesota, where they spent a few years. After the outbreak of the Dakota War of 1862, in the time of the Civil War, they went to Freeport, Illinois, where Mrs. Taylor decided to study medicine. She was aided by her husband and had the full sympathy and cooperation of her daughter in her efforts to obtain a thorough medical education. She attended the Hahnemann Medical College in Chicago, Illinois, from which she was graduated with honors on February 22, 1872.

She studied with Dr. N. F. Prentiss at Freeport, Illinois. Graduated from the Hahnemarn Medical College at Chicago in 1872, standing third in ber class. She joined the American Institute of Homoeopathy in 1873.

In 1875, she became a member of the Homeopathic State Medical Society of Illinois, and the same year, a member of the American Institute of Homeopathy. In 1879, she received a diploma from the Homeopathic Medical College of Chicago. She located for practice in Freeport, Illinois.

She enjoyed a large practice in Freeport, Illinois, until October 1880, at which time she removed to Boston to join her sister. In 1881, she became a member of the Homeopathic State Medical Society of Massachusetts. When her health failed in 1903, and she was obliged to give up her work.

== Personal life ==
Taylor was a member of the Daughters of the American Revolution.

After giving up her practice in 1903, Taylor made her home with her daughter, Vashti (Mrs. Charles F. Goodhue) of Brookline, Massachusetts. She was at the Goodhues' summer home at Wells, Maine when Taylor was stricken with paralysis on August 5, 1904, and only lived four days.

Esther W. Taylor died August 9, 1904. She was survived by her husband and daughter.
