= Sanbornton Square Historic District =

Historic district in New Hampshire, United States

- U.S. National Register of Historic Places
- U.S. Historic district
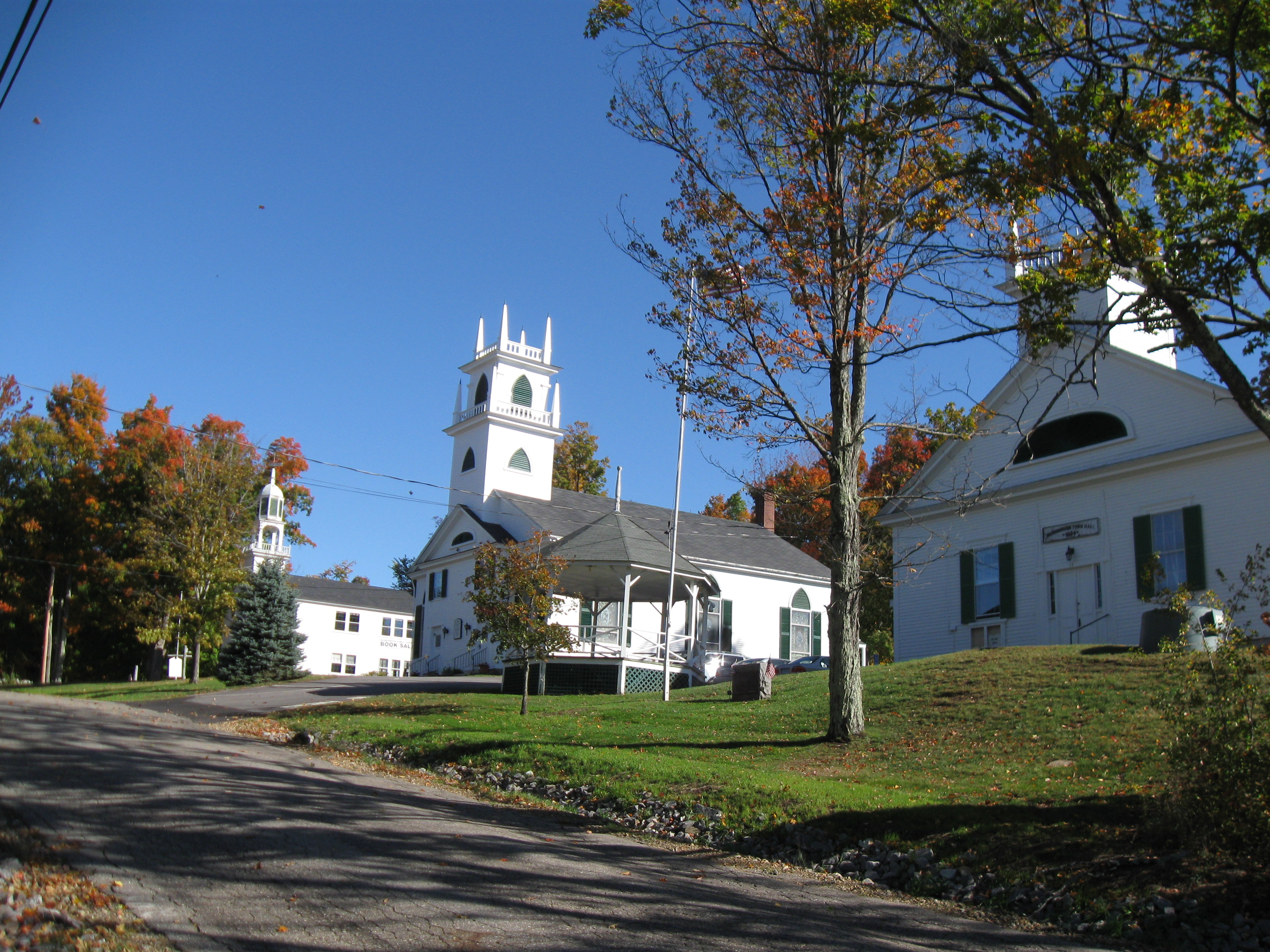

- Location within New Hampshire Location within the United States
- Location: Sanbornton, New Hampshire
- Coordinates: 43°29′33″N 71°35′1″W
- Area: 680 acres (280 ha)
- Built: 1748
- Architect: Multiple
- Architectural style: Greek Revival, Federal, Cape Cod
- NRHP reference No.: 80000417
- Added to NRHP: December 8, 1980

The Sanbornton Square Historic District encompasses the historic center of Sanbornton, New Hampshire. The town, granted in 1748 and incorporated in 1777, is the mother town of Franklin and Tilton, and was one of the first to be established by the Masonian proprietors. Unlike towns settled earlier, no specific plan was made for a town center, with the result that Sanbornton Square arose organically as the principal site of civic and religious life in the town. The district was listed on the National Register of Historic Places in 1980.

The historic district is centered on a stretch of New Hampshire Route 132, between Tower Hill Road and Gulf Road, and radiates for a short distance along a number of secondary roads that meet there. Its western bound is roughly Gulf Brook. The oldest surviving element of the original town is the old cemetery, which lies at the northern end of the district. The present church and town hall both date to c. 1834. These two buildings, along with the 1825 Woodman Sanbornton Academy building, are the major civic structures in the district. The rest of the district is residential, with a number of houses dating to the late 18th century, and most of the remaining buildings dating to the first half of the 19th century. Federal and Greek Revival styling predominate in the district; most of these buildings are wood-frame structures with clapboard siding.

== See also ==
- National Register of Historic Places listings in Belknap County, New Hampshire
