= John Page (New Hampshire politician) =

American farmer and politician (1787–1865)

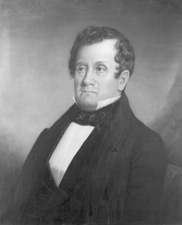

United States Senator from New Hampshire
- In office June 8, 1836 – March 3, 1837
- Preceded by: Isaac Hill
- Succeeded by: Franklin Pierce

17th Governor of New Hampshire
- In office June 5, 1839 – June 2, 1842
- Preceded by: Isaac Hill
- Succeeded by: Henry Hubbard

Member of the New Hampshire House of Representatives
- In office 1818–1820

Personal details
- Born: May 21, 1787 Haverhill, New Hampshire
- Died: September 8, 1865 (aged 78) Haverhill, New Hampshire
- Party: Democratic
- Other political affiliations: Democratic-Republican Party; Jacksonian; Free Soil Party
- Spouse: Hannah Merrill (1789–1855)
- Children: 9 (Including son John A. Page)
- Occupation: Farmer

John Page (May 21, 1787 – September 8, 1865) was an American farmer and politician from Haverhill, New Hampshire. He represented New Hampshire in the United States Senate and served as the 17th governor of New Hampshire from 1839 to 1842.

== Biography ==
John Page, Jr. was born in Haverhill, New Hampshire on May 21, 1787, the son of John Page (1741–1823) and Hannah Rice Green(e) (1757–1827). He attended the local schools and became a farmer.

During the War of 1812 Page served as lieutenant in a local militia company which performed duty on the border with Canada to prevent contraband trade and deter the threat of a British invasion.

While the war was ongoing and immediately afterwards Page held the federal office of tax assessor.

Page's party affiliation remained with different facets of the Democratic Party, and moved over time from the Democratic-Republican Party to the Jacksonians to the Democrats to the Free Soil Party.

He was a member of the New Hampshire House of Representatives from 1818 to 1820.

Page was also a longtime local and county official, serving as Register of Deeds for Grafton County in 1827 and again from 1829 to 1835. He served as a Selectman in Haverhill for fourteen non-consecutive terms, and was also the longtime town clerk.

He served in the state house again in 1835, and was a member of the Governor’s Council in 1836 and 1838.

In 1836 Page was elected to the United States Senate as a Democrat, temporarily filling the vacancy created when Isaac Hill resigned to become governor. Page served from June 8, 1836, to March 3, 1837. During the 1836 election to fill the vacancy it was agreed between the candidates that Page would complete Hill's term and then defer to Franklin Pierce. In 1837 Pierce was elected to a full six-year term and succeeded Page. During his Senate service Page was chairman of the Committee on Agriculture.

In 1839 Page was elected governor as a Democrat. He served until 1842, and was succeeded by Henry Hubbard, after which he resumed farming in Haverhill.

In his later years Page became affiliated with the Free Soil Party.

== Death and burial ==
Page died in Haverhill on September 8, 1865, and was buried in Haverhill's Ladd Street Cemetery.

== Family ==
In 1812 John Page married Hannah Merrill (1789–1855). They had nine children.

Among the children of John Page was John A. Page, who served as Vermont State Treasurer.

Party political offices
Preceded by Isaac Hill	Democratic nominee for Governor of New Hampshire; 1839, 1840, 1841	Succeeded by Henry Hubbard
U.S. Senate
Preceded by Isaac Hill	U.S. senator (Class 3) from New Hampshire; 1836–1837; Served alongside: Henry Hubbard	Succeeded by Franklin Pierce
Political offices
Preceded by Isaac Hill	Governor of New Hampshire; 1839–1842	Succeeded by Henry Hubbard
