= 1838 New Hampshire gubernatorial election =

- March 13, 1838
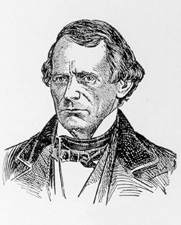

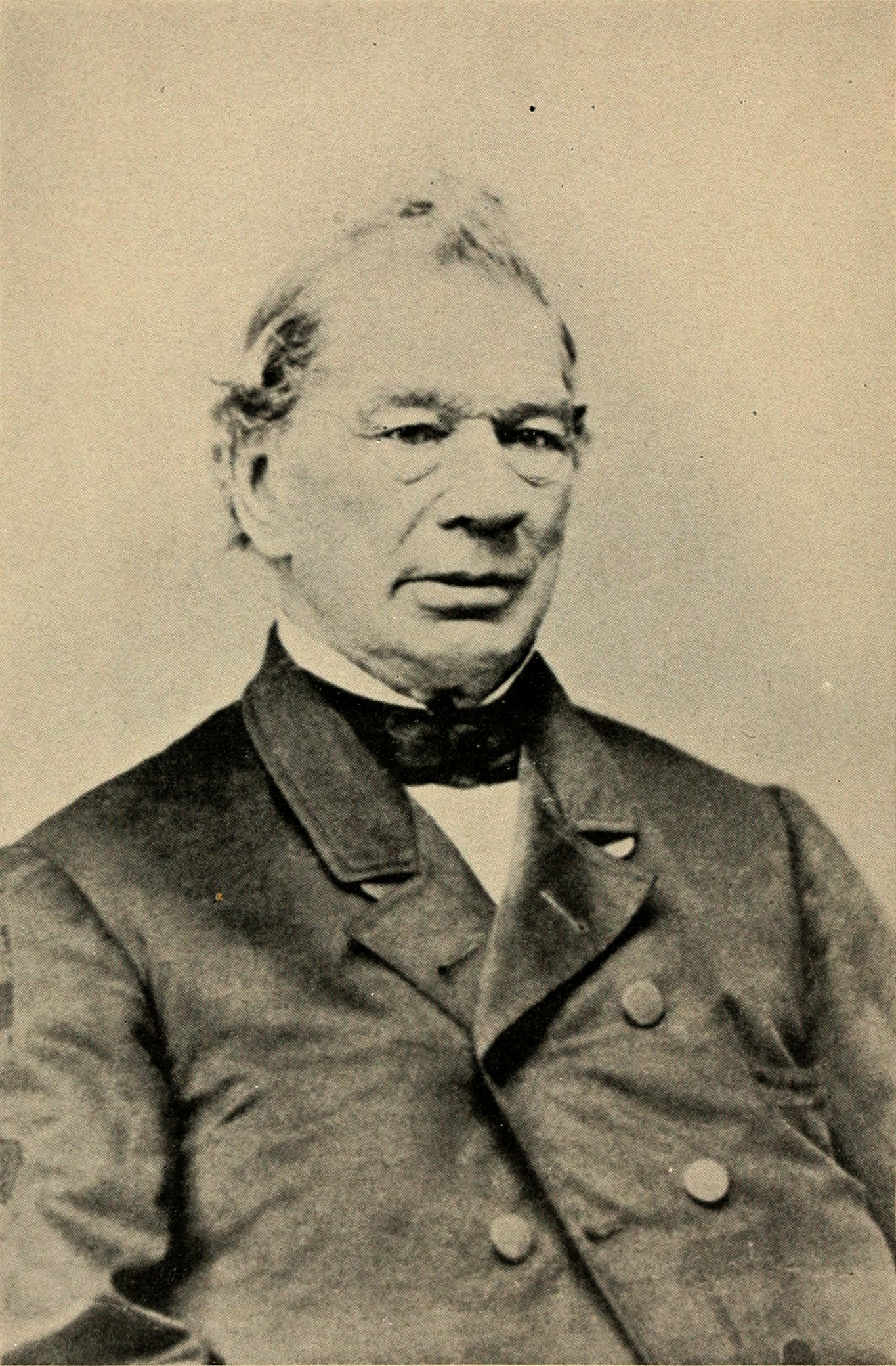
| Nominee | Isaac Hill | James Wilson II |
| Party | Democratic | Whig |
| Popular vote | 28,697 | 25,675 |
| Percentage | 52.59% | 47.05% |
- County results Page: 50–60% 60–70% 70–80% Wilson: 50–60% 60–70%
Governor before election
Isaac Hill
Democratic
Elected Governor
Isaac Hill
Democratic

The 1838 New Hampshire gubernatorial election was held on March 13, 1838.

Incumbent Democratic Governor Isaac Hill defeated Whig nominee James Wilson II with 52.59% of the vote.

== General election ==
=== Candidates ===
- Isaac Hill, Democratic, incumbent Governor
- James Wilson II, Whig, former Speaker of the New Hampshire House of Representatives

=== Results ===
1838 New Hampshire gubernatorial election (Note: Some sources give slightly different results. The result given is taken from the New Hampshire Senate Journal.)
| Party | Candidate | Votes | % | ±% |
|---|---|---|---|---|
| Democratic | Isaac Hill (incumbent) | 28,697 | 52.59% | |
| Whig | James Wilson II | 25,675 | 47.05% | |
| Scattering | | 198 | 0.36% | |
| Majority | | 3,022 | 5.54% | |
| Turnout | | 54,570 | | |
| Democratic hold | | Swing | | |
