= 1834 Ohio gubernatorial election =

- October 14, 1834
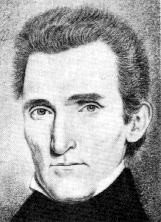

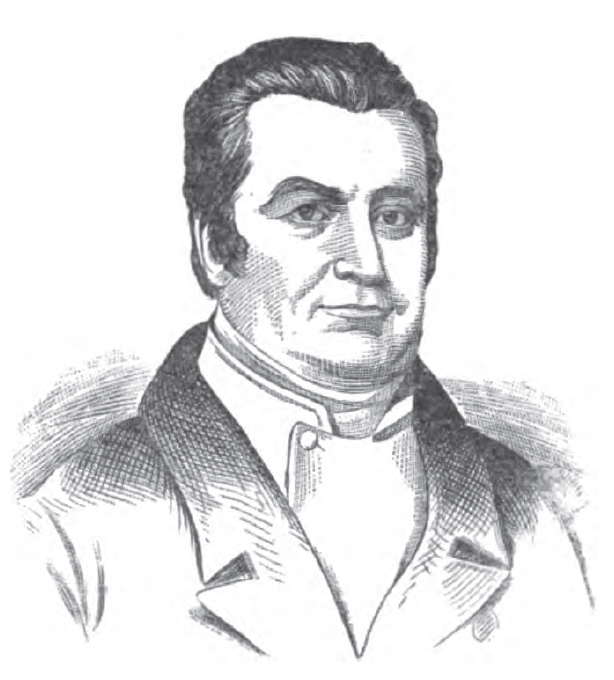
| Nominee | Robert Lucas | James Findlay |
| Party | Democratic | Whig |
| Popular vote | 70,738 | 67,414 |
| Percentage | 51.19% | 48.78% |
- Election results by county Lucas: 50–60% 60–70% 70–80% 90–100% Findlay: 50–60% 60–70% 70–80% No Data/Vote
Governor before election
Robert Lucas
Democratic
Elected Governor
Robert Lucas
Democratic

The 1834 Ohio gubernatorial election was held on October 14, 1834.

Incumbent Democratic Governor Robert Lucas was re-elected to a second term, defeating Whig nominee, former Mayor of Cincinnati and former U.S. Representative, James Findlay.

== General election ==
=== Results ===
1834 Ohio gubernatorial election
| Party | Candidate | Votes | % | ±% |
|---|---|---|---|---|
| Democratic | Robert Lucas (incumbent) | 70,738 | 51.19% | |
| Whig | James Findlay | 67,414 | 48.78% | |
| Scattering | | 38 | 0.03% | |
| Majority | | 3,324 | 2.41% | |
| Turnout | | 138,190 | | |
| Democratic hold | | Swing | | |
