= William Badger =

American politician (1779–1852)

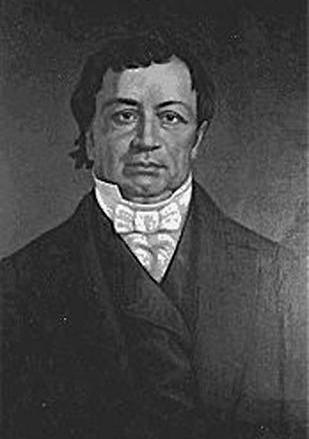

15th Governor of New Hampshire
- In office June 5, 1834 – June 2, 1836
- Preceded by: Samuel Dinsmoor
- Succeeded by: Isaac Hill

President of the New Hampshire Senate
- In office 1816–1817
- Preceded by: Moses P. Payson
- Succeeded by: Jonathan Harvey

Member of the New Hampshire Senate
- In office 1814–1817

Member of the New Hampshire House of Representatives
- In office 1810–1812

Personal details
- Born: January 13, 1779 Gilmanton, New Hampshire
- Died: September 21, 1852 (aged 73) Gilmanton, New Hampshire

William Badger (January 13, 1779 – September 21, 1852) was an American manufacturer and mill owner from Gilmanton, New Hampshire. He served in both houses of the New Hampshire state legislature and was the 15th governor of New Hampshire from 1834 to 1836.

== Biography ==
Badger was born in Gilmanton, New Hampshire. Educated at common school and at Gilmanton Academy, Badger worked after his school years to build a cotton cloth factory, a saw mill and a grist mill for his town. In 1804 Badger was made a trustee of Gilmanton Academy; he ultimately became president of the board for the school.

Badger served as an aide to John Langdon (Governor four different times, including 1805 to 1809). In 1810, Badger was elected to the first of three consecutive terms as a member of the New Hampshire House of Representatives (1810–1812); then he served three terms in the New Hampshire Senate (1814–1817) where he served as President of the Senate in 1816–1817. Badger served as Associate Justice, Court of Common Pleas (1816–1820), and as High Sheriff of Strafford County, New Hampshire (1820–1830). He was a Presidential Elector in the national elections of 1824, 1836 and 1844.

In 1834, Badger won the gubernatorial election, and he won the next term as well. As Governor, Badger called for eliminating capital punishment, a new idea for New Hampshire. He also had to deal with the breakaway Indian Stream Republic. Badger encouraged the legislature to support President Andrew Jackson's successful efforts to do away with the Second Bank of the United States (helping to bring on the Panic of 1837). Badger tried to inject new life into the state militia by statute; he also was interested in bringing smallpox prevention directly to the state's small farming towns.

== See also ==
- New Hampshire Historical Marker No. 235: Belmont Mill / Saving the Belmont Mill

Party political offices
Preceded by Samuel Dinsmoor	Democratic nominee for Governor of New Hampshire; 1834, 1835	Succeeded by Isaac Hill
Political offices
Preceded by Samuel Dinsmoor	Governor of New Hampshire; 1834–1836	Succeeded by Isaac Hill
Preceded by Moses P. Payson	President of the New Hampshire Senate; 1816–1817	Succeeded by Jonathan Harvey
