= 1834 Virginia gubernatorial election =

- January 7, 1834
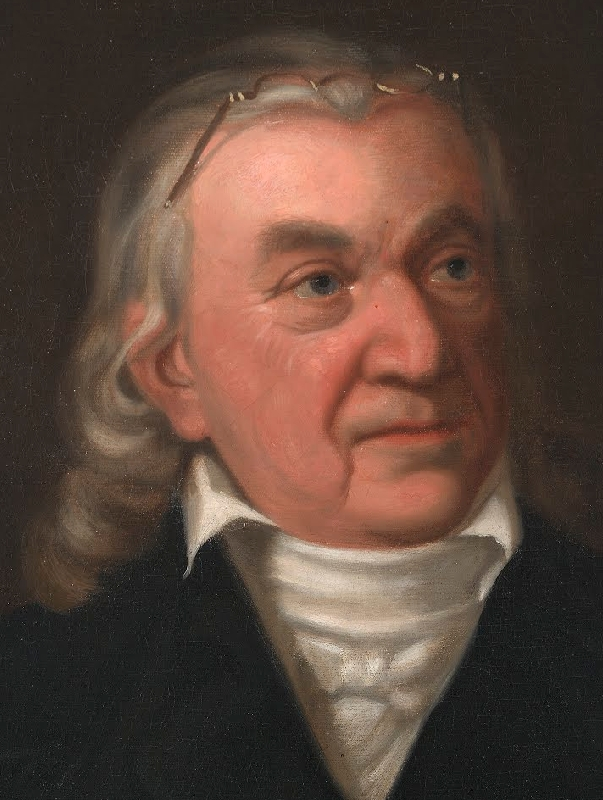

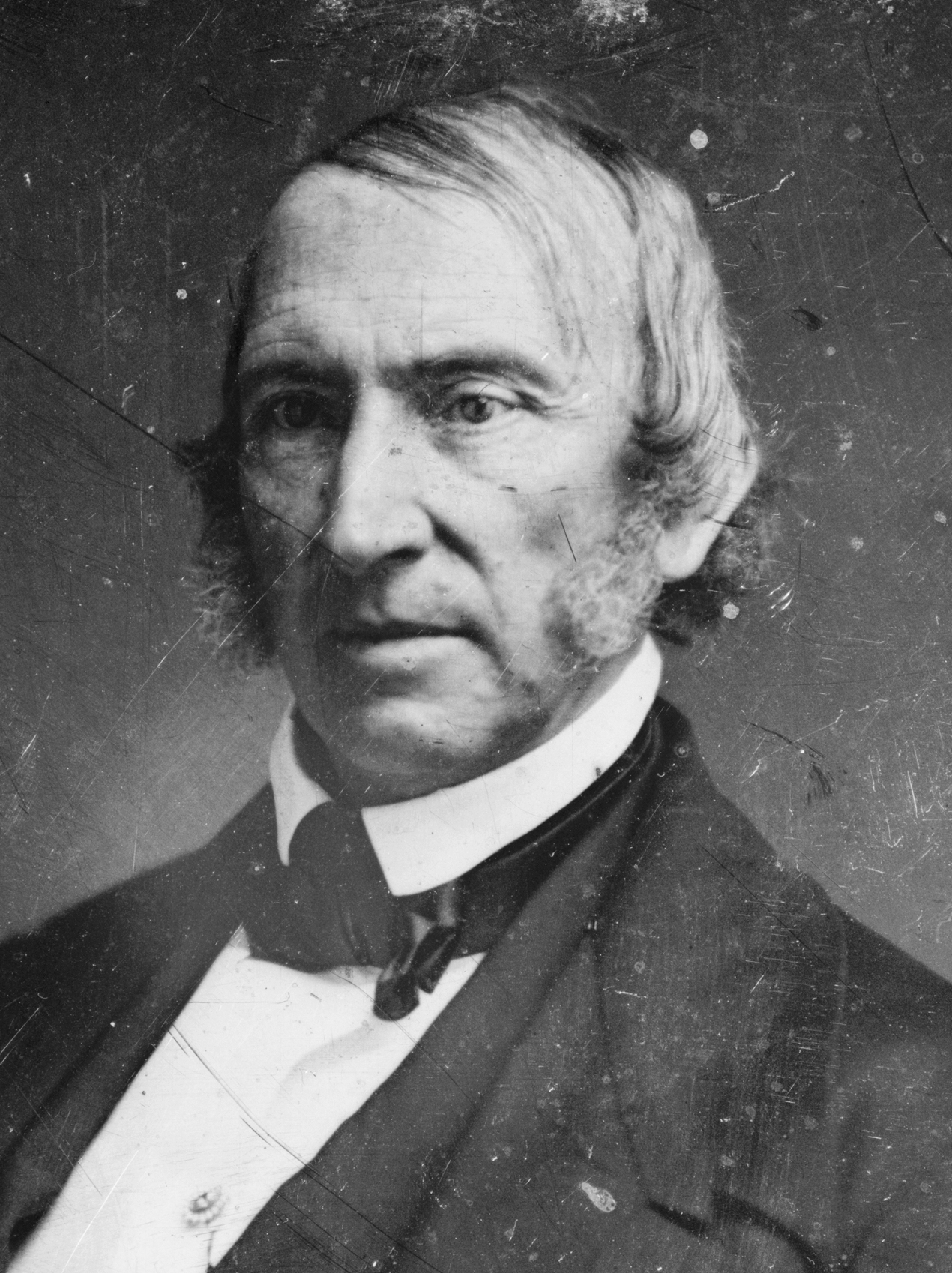

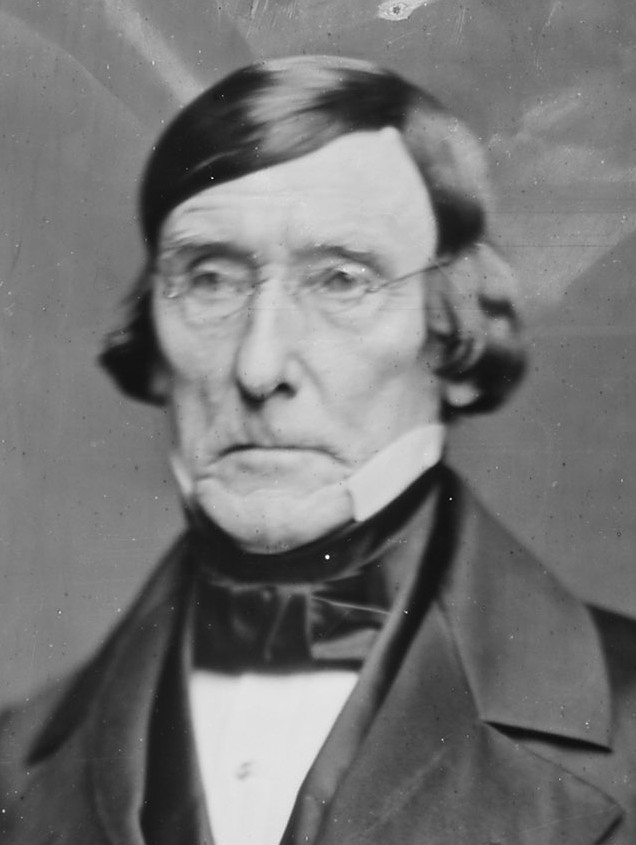
Nominee	Littleton Waller Tazewell	Edward Watts
Party	State Rights	National Republican
1st ballot	67	46
2nd ballot	85	53
Nominee	James McDowell	Peter V. Daniel
Party	Democratic	Democratic
1st ballot	7	40
2nd ballot	22	2
Governor before election
John Floyd
Democratic
Elected Governor
Littleton Waller Tazewell
State Rights

A gubernatorial election was held in Virginia on January 7, 1834. The State Rights former U.S. senator from Virginia Littleton Waller Tazewell defeated the National Republican former member of the Virginia Senate from Campbell County Edward Watts, the Democratic member of the Council of State Peter V. Daniel, and the Democratic member of the Virginia House of Delegates from Rockbridge County James McDowell.

The Bank War split the Virginia Democratic Party along factional and ideological lines, prompting State Rights Democrats to seek a coalition with the National Republicans in hopes of deposing the governing Richmond Junto. Seeing the gubernatorial election as an opportunity to bring the disparate opposition forces into the Whig Party, the state's senior U.S. senator John Tyler and the outgoing governor of Virginia John Floyd persuaded Tazewell to stand as the State Rights gubernatorial candidate. The National Republicans nominated Watts, while the Democrats were divided between supporters of Daniel, one of the leaders of the Junto, and McDowell, who was nominated by Democrats from Western Virginia.

The election was conducted by the Virginia General Assembly in joint session. No candidate had a majority on the first ballot, requiring a second round of voting. Tazewell was elected with a majority on the second ballot.

Reactions to the election were mixed, with some observers interpreting the result as a rebuke of the national Jackson Administration. Thomas Ritchie, the editor of the Democratic Richmond Enquirer, claimed that Tazewell's supporters included both pro-administration Democrats and State Rights members and attributed the result to the confused partisan situation in the legislature. The State Rights–National Republican coalition became the basis for the Virginia Whig Party, which held a majority in the General Assembly following the May 1834 legislative elections.

== General election ==
1834 Virginia gubernatorial election
Party	Candidate	First ballot		Second ballot	
Party	Candidate	Count	Percent	Count	Percent
State Rights	Littleton Waller Tazewell	67	41.88	85	52.47
National Republican	Edward Watts	46	28.75	53	32.72
Democratic	Peter V. Daniel	40	25.00	2	1.23
Democratic	James McDowell	7	4.38	22	13.58
Total		160	100.00	162	100.00

== Bibliography ==
- Dent, Lynwood Miller (1974). The Virginia Democratic Party, 1824-1847. (Volumes I and II) (PhD thesis). [Baton Rouge]: Louisiana State University.
- Holt, Michael F. (1999). The Rise and Fall of the American Whig Party: Jacksonian Politics and the Onset of the Civil War. New York: Oxford University Press.
- Virginia (1833). Journal of the House of Delegates [...]. Richmond.
