= 1834 New Hampshire gubernatorial election =

- March 11, 1834
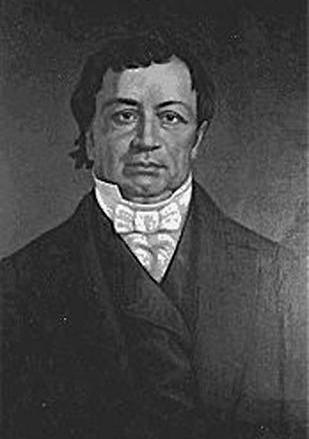
Nominee	William Badger
Party	Democratic
Popular vote	28,542
Percentage	94.59%
- County results Badger: 90–100%
Governor before election
Samuel Dinsmoor
Democratic
Elected Governor
William Badger
Democratic

The 1834 New Hampshire gubernatorial election was held on March 11, 1834.

Incumbent Democratic Governor Samuel Dinsmoor did not stand for re-election.

Democratic nominee William Badger was elected without formal opposition.

== General election ==
=== Candidate ===
- William Badger, Democratic, former President of the New Hampshire Senate

=== Results ===
1834 New Hampshire gubernatorial election (Note: Some sources give scattering votes as 1,455. The result given is taken from the New Hampshire Senate Journal.)
Party	Candidate	Votes	%	±%
Democratic	William Badger	28,542	94.59%	
Scattering		1,631	5.41%	
Majority		26,911	89.19%	
Turnout		30,173		
Democratic hold		Swing		
