= Isaac Hill =

American politician (1789–1851)

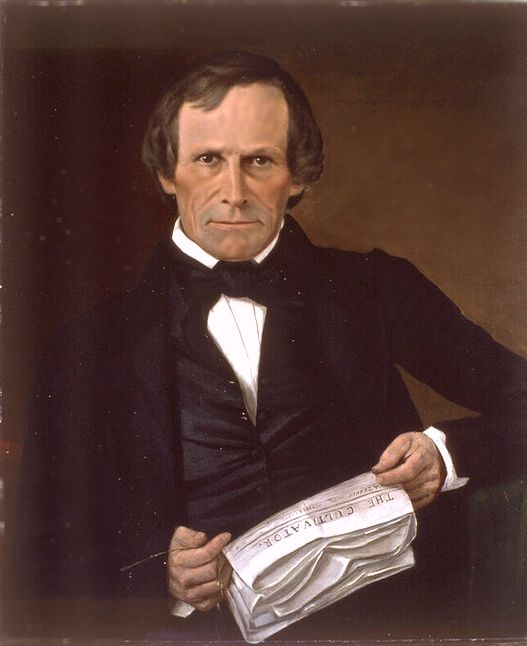

United States Senator from New Hampshire
- In office March 4, 1831 – May 30, 1836
- Preceded by: Levi Woodbury
- Succeeded by: John Page

16th Governor of New Hampshire
- In office June 2, 1836 – June 5, 1839
- Preceded by: William Badger
- Succeeded by: John Page

Member of the New Hampshire House of Representatives
- In office 1826

Member of the New Hampshire Senate
- In office 1820–1823; 1827–1828

Personal details
- Born: April 6, 1788 Cambridge, Massachusetts, U.S.
- Died: March 22, 1851 (aged 62) Washington, D.C., U.S.
- Party: Democratic-Republican; Democratic
- Occupation: Newspaper editor, politician

Isaac Hill (April 6, 1788 – March 22, 1851) was an American politician, journalist, political commentator and newspaper editor who was a United States senator and the 16th governor of New Hampshire, serving three consecutive terms.

== Biography ==
Hill was born on April 6, 1788, in West Cambridge, Massachusetts, (now Belmont). Born into a relatively poor family, his parents were Isaac and Hannah (Russell). Their marriage brought nine children, with Isaac being the eldest of the siblings.

Hill, as a member of the Democratic Party, was a bitter political opponent of President John Quincy Adams, and supported the policies of President Andrew Jackson. A member of Jackson's informal "Kitchen Cabinet," Hill was the most avid proponent of the "spoils system" employed during Jackson's presidency. Hill supported John C. Calhoun during the 1844 presidential election.

Hill was publisher of the New Hampshire Patriot. Jacob Bailey Moore apprenticed under Hill and later married his sister Mary Adams Hill. The brothers-in-law had a difficult relationship due to their political differences, and Moore later worked for the competing New Hampshire Journal. Hill's caustic newspaper editorials were the source of much political controversy among political parties and cost him a nomination to the New Hampshire Senate, but he later was nominated and elected twice, serving 1820–1823 and 1827–1828. He later was nominated for the United States Senate and was elected in 1831. He resigned from the Senate when he was elected Governor of New Hampshire, serving 1836–1839, and chose not to run for re-election.

In the latter part of his life, Hill became active in other ventures including railroads, real estate, banking and manufacturing enterprises and became moderately wealthy and accumulated a considerable estate. He was active in the promotion of various agricultural improvements. In his last years, Hill suffered constantly from asthma. He died on March 22, 1851, in Washington, D.C., and was buried at Blossom Hill Cemetery in Concord, New Hampshire. The town of Hill, New Hampshire, is named after him.

According to historian Joanne B. Freeman, "Hill revolutionized New Hampshire politics, helping set the stage for what would eventually become structured national political parties."

== See also ==
- List of governors of New Hampshire
- List of United States senators from New Hampshire

== Bibliography ==
- Ashworth, John (1983). 'Agrarians' and 'Aristocrats': Party Political Ideology in the United States, 1837-1846. Cambridge University Press. p. 258. ISBN 978-0-5213-3567-6.
- Bradley, Cyrus Parker (1835). Biography of Isaac Hill (PDF). John F. Brown.
- Capace, Nancy (2001). Encyclopedia of New Hampshire. Somerset Publishers. ISBN 978-0-4030-9601-5.
- Heffernan, Nancy Coffey; Stecker, Ann Page (2004). New Hampshire: Crosscurrents in its Development. p. 123. ISBN 9781584653943.
- Corps, Terry (2009). The A to Z of the Jacksonian Era and Manifest Destiny. Scarecrow Press. ISBN 978-0-8108-7016-1.
- Cutter, Benjamin; Cutter, William Richard (1880). History of the Town of Arlington, Massachusetts. p. 260.
- Hurd, Duane Hamilton (1890). History of Middlesex County, Massachusetts. Vol. 3.
- Marquis, James (1938). The life of Andrew Jackson, complete in one volume. Indianapolis, New York, The Bobbs-Merrill company.
- Polk, James Knox (1983). Correspondence of James K. Polk: 1842-1843. Univ. of Tennessee Press. ISBN 978-0-8265-1211-6.
- Schlesinger, Arthur M. (1953) [1945]. The Age of Jackson. Boston, MA: Little, Brown and Company. ISBN 978-0-3167-7343-0.
- Dumas Malone, ed. (1932). Dictionary of American biography. Vol. IX. New York: Charles Scribner's Sons.
- Dumas Malone, ed. (1932). Dictionary of American biography. Vol. XIII. New York: Charles Scribner's Sons.
- History of Bedford, New Hampshire. Rumford Printing Company. 1903.
- Spencer, Thomas E. (1998). Where They're Buried. Baltimore, Md. : Clearfield Co. ISBN 9780806348230.
- Webster, Daniel (1986). The Papers of Daniel Webster: 1798-1824. Dartmouth College. ISBN 9780874513233.
- Edwards, B. B.; Cogswell, W., eds. (November 1840). "History of Newspapers in New Hampshire". The Quarterly Register and Journal of the American Education Society. 12–13. American Education Society.

Party political offices
Preceded by William Badger	Democratic nominee for Governor of New Hampshire; 1836, 1837, 1838	Succeeded by John Page
U.S. Senate
Preceded by Levi Woodbury	U.S. senator (Class 3) from New Hampshire; 1831–1836; Served alongside: Samuel Bell, Henry Hubbard	Succeeded by John Page
Political offices
Preceded by William Badger	Governor of New Hampshire; 1836–1839	Succeeded by John Page
