= 1840 New Hampshire gubernatorial election =

Election held on March 10, 1840

- March 10, 1840
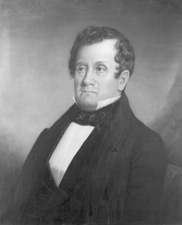

Nominee	John Page	Enos Stevens
Party	Democratic	Whig
Popular vote	29,521	20,716
Percentage	58.11%	40.78%
- County results Page: 50–60% 60–70% 70–80% Stevens: 50–60%
Governor before election
John Page
Democratic
Elected Governor
John Page
Democratic

The 1840 New Hampshire gubernatorial election was held on March 10, 1840.

Incumbent Democratic Governor John Page defeated Whig nominee Enos Stevens with 58.11% of the vote.

== General election ==
=== Candidates ===
- John Page, Democratic, incumbent Governor
- Enos Stevens, Whig, incumbent member of the Executive Council of New Hampshire

=== Results ===
1840 New Hampshire gubernatorial election (Note: Some sources give slightly different results. The result given is taken from the New Hampshire Senate Journal.)
Party	Candidate	Votes	%	±%
Democratic	John Page (incumbent)	29,521	58.11%	
Whig	Enos Stevens	20,716	40.78%	
Scattering		562	1.11%	
Majority		8,805	17.33%	
Turnout		50,799		
Democratic hold		Swing		
