= Henry Hubbard =

American politician (1784–1857)

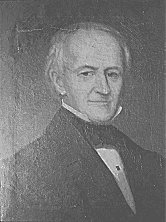

18th Governor of New Hampshire
- In office June 2, 1842 – June 6, 1844
- Preceded by: John Page
- Succeeded by: John Hardy Steele

United States Senator from New Hampshire
- In office March 4, 1835 – March 3, 1841
- Preceded by: Samuel Bell
- Succeeded by: Levi Woodbury

Member of the U.S. House of Representatives from New Hampshire's At-large district
- In office March 4, 1829 – March 3, 1835
- Preceded by: Thomas Whipple, Jr.
- Succeeded by: Joseph Weeks

Member of the New Hampshire House of Representatives
- In office 1812–1814; 1819–1820; 1823–1827

Personal details
- Born: May 3, 1784 Charlestown, New Hampshire, U.S.
- Died: June 5, 1857 (aged 73) Charlestown, New Hampshire, U.S.
- Party: Democratic Party
- Spouse: Sally Walker Dean
- Children: Five
- Education: Dartmouth College
- Profession: Lawyer
- Committees: Committee on Claims; Committee on Revolutionary Pensions

Henry Hubbard (May 3, 1784 – June 5, 1857) was a member of the United States House of Representatives from 1829 to 1835, a senator from New Hampshire during 1835 to 1841, and the 18th governor of New Hampshire from 1842 to 1844.

== Early life ==
Henry Hubbard was born on May 3, 1784, in Charlestown, New Hampshire in the United States. Hubbard was educated at home, and engaged in classical studies whilst taught by private tutors, before attending Dartmouth College and graduating from there in 1803. He studied law in Portsmouth with Jeremiah Mason, and was admitted to the New Hampshire bar around 1806. That year, he began practicing law in Charlestown. Hubbard married Sally Walker Dean in 1813; together, they would have 5 children. In 1818, Hubbard purchased 50 shares of the Suffolk Bank, a clearinghouse bank on State Street in Boston.

== Political career ==
In 1810, Hubbard entered politics for the first time, and was elected to the position of Town Moderator; by the end of his life, he would be elected Town Moderator sixteen times. In 1812, Hubbard became a member of the New Hampshire House of Representatives, and served until 1814, as well as from 1819 to 1820, and 1823 to 1827. From 1825 to 1827, he was the Speaker of the House. Hubbard was also selectman in 1819, 1820 and 1828, the Judge Advocate of the 5th Militia Brigade, the Solicitor for Sullivan County from 1823 to 1828 as well as the state solicitor for Cheshire County during that time, and Probate Judge for Sullivan County beginning in 1827 and ending in 1829.

Early on, Hubbard was a Federalist, but on March 4, 1829, he started as a member of the United States House of Representatives, as a Jackson Democrat. He served during the 21st, 22nd, and 23rd Congresses; in the 22nd, he was the chairman of the Committee on Revolutionary Pensions. Hubbard was also the Speaker pro tem in 1834, and he left the House on March 3, 1835, having been elected to the United States Senate as a Democrat. During the 24th, 25th, and 26th Congresses, Hubbard held the position of chairman of the Committee on Claims. He ended his career in the Senate on March 3, 1841. Hubbard gained the Democratic nomination for Governor of New Hampshire, and was elected by popular vote in 1842, winning re-election in 1843. As Governor, Hubbard "favored lowering high national protective tariffs, denounced capital punishment, and called for state legislation to curb corporate shareholder profits made at the public expense." He also argued that women who owned property should be given a tax reduction.

== Later life ==
Hubbard was the subtreasurer in Boston from 1846 to 1849, afterwards returning to Charlestown to practice law. He died there on June 5, 1857, and was interred in Forest Hill Cemetery.

== Sources ==
- Bastedo, Russell (1998). "Publications - A Guide to Likenesses of New Hampshire Officials and Governors on Public Display at the Legislative Office Building and the State House Concord, New Hampshire, to 1998". New Hampshire Division of Historical Records.
- "Hubbard, Henry, (1784 - 1857)". United States Congress.
- "New Hampshire Governor Henry Hubbard". National Governors Association. Archived from the original on 2011-06-04.

Party political offices
| Preceded by John Page | Democratic nominee for Governor of New Hampshire; 1842, 1843 | Succeeded by John Hardy Steele |
Political offices
| Preceded by Levi Woodbury | Speaker of the New Hampshire House of Representatives; 1825–1828 | Succeeded by James Wilson |
U.S. House of Representatives
| Preceded by Thomas Whipple Jr. | Member of the U.S. House of Representatives from New Hampshire's at-large congressional district 1829–1835 | Succeeded by Joseph Weeks |
U.S. Senate
| Preceded by Samuel Bell | U.S. senator (Class 2) from New Hampshire; 1835–1841; Served alongside: Isaac Hill, John Page, Franklin Pierce | Succeeded by Levi Woodbury |
Political offices
| Preceded by John Page | Governor of New Hampshire; 1842–1844 | Succeeded by John H. Steele |
