= 2026 United States House of Representatives elections in New Hampshire =

- November 3, 2026

Both New Hampshire seats to the United States House of Representatives
	Majority party	Minority party
Party	Democratic	Republican
Last election	2	0
Seats won	2	0
Seat change	Steady	Steady
Popular vote	341,628	237,112
Percentage	58.36%	40.50%
Swing	▲4.89%	▼5.95%

Democratic
50–60%
60–70%
70–80%
80–90%
Republican
40–50%
50–60%
60–70%
70–80%

The 2026 United States House of Representatives elections in New Hampshire were held on November 3, 2026, to elect the two U.S. representatives from the state of New Hampshire, one from both of the state's congressional districts. The elections coincided with the other elections to the House of Representatives, elections to the United States Senate, and various state and local elections. The primary election took place on September 8, 2026.

== Statewide polling ==
=== Statewide congressional polls ===
Poll source	Date(s) administered	Sample size (Note: Key: A – all adults RV – registered voters LV – likely voters V – unclear)	Margin of error	Democratic	Republican	Other	Undecided
Saint Anselm College	October 19–20, 2026	1,672 (LV)	± 2.4%	52%	43%	3% (Note: "Other" with 3%)	2%
The New York Times/Siena University	September 15–22, 2026	613 (LV)	± 4.9%	52%	43%	–	5%

== District 1 ==
2026 New Hampshire's 1st congressional district election

Nominee	Stefany Shaheen	Anthony DiLorenzo
Party	Democratic	Republican
Popular vote	180,763	136,115
Percentage	57.04%	42.96%
- Municipality results Shaheen: 50–60% 60–70% 70–80% 80–90% DiLorenzo: 50–60% 60–70%
U.S. Representative before election
Chris Pappas
Democratic
Elected U.S. Representative
Stefany Shaheen
Democratic

The 1st district is based in southeastern New Hampshire, and includes Greater Manchester, the Seacoast and the Lakes Region. The incumbent is Democrat Chris Pappas, who was re-elected with 54.0% of the vote in 2024. Pappas is retiring to run for Senate in 2026.

=== Democratic primary ===
==== Nominee ====
- Stefany Shaheen, former Portsmouth city councilor and daughter of U.S. Senator Jeanne Shaheen

==== Eliminated in primary ====
- Carleigh Beriont, Hampton selectwoman
- Sarah Chadzynski, nonprofit director
- Bill Conlin, former state representative from the Strafford 15th district (2022–2024)
- Matthew Emerson, organizer
- Sarah Bella Spinosa, libertarian activist and journalist
- Maura Sullivan, vice chair of the New Hampshire Democratic Party, former Assistant to the Secretary of Defense for Public Affairs (2015), and candidate for this district in 2018

==== Withdrawn ====
- Heath Howard, state representative from the Strafford 4th district (2022–present) (remained on ballot; endorsed Beriont)
- Christian Urrutia, lawyer and Army National Guard captain (remained on ballot; endorsed Shaheen)

==== Declined ====
- Debra Altschiller, state senator from the 24th district (2022–present) (running for re-election)
- Deaglan McEachern, mayor of Portsmouth and candidate for this district in 2018 (endorsed Shaheen)
- Chris Pappas, incumbent U.S. representative (running for U.S. Senate)
- Tom Sherman, former state senator from the 24th district (2018–2022) and nominee for governor in 2022 (endorsed Shaheen)

==== Endorsements ====
Carleigh Beriont

U.S. representatives

- Dennis Kucinich, former OH-10 (1997–2013) (Independent, served as a Democrat)

State legislators

- Heath Howard, state representative from the Strafford 4th district (2022–present) and former candidate for this seat

Organizations

- Progressive Democrats of America
Sarah Chadzynski

U.S. representatives

- Adam Kinzinger, former IL-16 (2011–2023) (Republican)
Maura Sullivan

Executive branch officials

- George Charles Bruno, former ambassador to Belize (1994–1997)
- Carlos Del Toro, former secretary of the navy (2021–2025)
- Frank Kendall III, former secretary of the air force (2021–2025)
- Christine Wormuth, former secretary of the army (2021–2025)

U.S. representatives

- Jason Crow, CO-6 (2019–present)
- Chris Deluzio, PA-17 (2023–present)
- Chrissy Houlahan, PA-6 (2019–present)
- Seth Moulton, MA-6 (2015–present)
- Pat Ryan, NY-18 (2023–present)

Statewide officials

- Mikie Sherrill, governor of New Jersey (2026–present)
- Abigail Spanberger, governor of Virginia (2026–present)

State legislators

- 10 state legislators (Note: Peter Burling, former state senator from the 5th district (2004–2008); Lou D'Allesandro, former state senator from the 20th district (1998–2024); Martha Fuller Clark, former President pro tempore of the New Hampshire Senate (2018–2020) from the 21st district (2012–2020, 2004–2010); Jaci Grote, state representative from the Rockingham 24th district (2018–present); Patrick Long, state senator from the 20th district (2024–present); Jennifer Mandelbaum, state representative from the Rockingham 21st district (2024–present); Suzanne Prentiss, state senator from the 5th district (2020–present); Steve Shurtleff, former Speaker of the New Hampshire House of Representatives (2018–2020) from the Merrimack 11th district (2004–present); Donna Soucy, former President of the New Hampshire Senate (2018–2020) from the 18th district (2018–2024); David Watters, state senator from the 4th district (2012–present))

Individuals

- Rebecca Bennett, healthcare executive and former United States Navy aviator
- Cait Conley, former senior advisor to the Cybersecurity and Infrastructure Security Agency
- Paul Eaton, former deputy chief of staff for the U.S. Army Training and Doctrine Command
- JoAnna Mendoza, former veteran services representative for U.S. Representative Tom O'Halleran

Labor unions

- IBEW Local 2071

Organizations

- Democratic Majority for Israel
- Vote Mama
- VoteVets
- With Honor Fund
Stefany Shaheen

Executive branch officials

- Rahm Emanuel, former ambassador to Japan (2022–2025)

U.S. senators

- Maggie Hassan, New Hampshire (2017–present)
- Mark Kelly, Arizona (2020–present)
- Jeanne Shaheen, New Hampshire (2009–present) (candidate's mother)

U.S. representatives

- Carol Shea-Porter, former NH-01 (2007–2011; 2013–2015; 2017–2019)

Statewide officials

- Gavin Newsom, governor of California (2019–present)
- JB Pritzker, governor of Illinois (2019–present)
- John Lynch, former governor of New Hampshire (2005–2013)

State legislators

- Jon Morgan, former state senator from the 23rd district (2018–2020)
- Tom Sherman, former state senator from the 24th district (2018–2022)

Individuals

- Christian Urrutia, lawyer, Army National Guard Captain, and former candidate for this seat

Labor unions

- American Federation of Teachers
- IBEW Local 490
- National Education Association-New Hampshire
- Professional Fire Fighters of New Hampshire
- Teamsters Local 633

Organizations

- Giffords
- J Street
- League of Conservation Voters
- National Committee to Preserve Social Security and Medicare
Christian Urrutia (withdrawn, remains on ballot)

Statewide officials

- Andru Volinsky, former executive councilor from the 2nd district (2017–2021)

Organizations

- 350 New Hampshire Action
- Latino Victory
- New Hampshire House Progressive Caucus
- Our Revolution
Heath Howard (withdrawn, remains on ballot)

State legislators

- 31 state legislators (Note: Myles England, state representative from the Strafford 12th district (2024–present); Eric Gallager, state representative from the Merrimack 20th district (2020–present); Gerry Ward, state representative from the Rockingham 27th district (2022–present); Tony Caplan, state representative from the Merrimack 8th district (2022–present); Christal Lloyd, state representative from the Hillsborough 8th district (2022–present); Suraj Budathoki, state representative from the Hillsborough 40th district (2024–present); Lily Foss, state representative from the Hillsborough 41st district (2024–present); Molly Howard, state representative from the Hillsborough 31st district (2024–present); Samantha Jacobs, state representative from the Cheshire 15th district (2024–present); Ellen Read, state representative from the Rockingham 17th district (2016–present); Gary Gilmore, state representative from the Strafford 16th district (2024–present); Louis Juris, state representative from the Hillsborough 7th district (2022–present); Amy Malone, state representative from the Strafford 9th district (2024–present); Sanjeev Manohar, state representative from the Hillsborough 9th district (2024–present); Lucius Parshall, state representative from the Cheshire 8th district (2024–present); William Dolan, state representative from the Hillsborough 9th district (2022–present); Linda Ryan, state representative from the Hillsborough 4th district (2024–present); Tom Schamberg, state representative from the Merrimack 6th district (2016–present); John Cloutier, state representative from the Sullivan 10th district (1992–present); Fred Davis Jr., state representative from the Hillsborough 3rd district (2024–present); Dylan Germana, state representative from the Cheshire 1st district (2024–present); Philip Jones, state representative from the Cheshire 3rd district (2024–present); Wayne Pearson, state representative from the Strafford 12th district (2024–present); Catherine Sofikitis, state representative from the Hillsborough 34th district (2016–present); Marc Plamondon, state representative from the Hillsborough 3rd district (2023–present); Nicholas Germana, state representative from the Cheshire 15th district (2022–present); Tracy Bricchi, state representative from the Strafford 5th district (2022–present); Cam Kenney, state representative from the Strafford 6th district (2020–2024); Hal Rafter, state representative from the Rockingham 1st district (2023–2024); Bob Perry, state representative from the Strafford 20th district (2006–2010, 2012–2014); Robin Vogt, Durham town councilor (2023–present) and former state representative from the Rockingham 24th district (2022–2023))

Labor unions

- IBEW Local 104

Organizations

- Center for Freethought Equality
- Progressive Victory
- Southern New Hampshire Democratic Socialists of America
- Track AIPAC
- Vote Common Good

==== Fundraising ====
Campaign finance reports as of March 31, 2026
Candidate	Raised	Spent	Cash on hand
Carleigh Beriont (D)	$385,021	$297,338	$87,682
Sarah Chadzynski (D)	$70,321	$56,629	$13,692
Heath Howard (D)	$34,242	$31,190	$1,443
Stefany Shaheen (D)	$1,800,994	$687,857	$1,113,137
Maura Sullivan (D)	$2,638,370	$1,167,194	$1,478,399
Christian Urrutia (D)	$836,091	$564,957	$271,134
Source: Federal Election Commission

==== Polling ====
Poll source	Date(s) administered	Sample size	Margin of error	Carleigh Beriont	Sarah Chadzynski	Heath Howard	Stefany Shaheen	Maura Sullivan	Christian Urrutia	Other	Undecided
Tavern Research (D)	August 28–31, 2026	1,068 (LV)	± 3.4%	12%	0%	2%	27%	33% (Note: With voters who lean towards a given candidate)	4%	1% (Note: Bill Conlin, Matthew Emerson & Sarah Bella Spinosa with 0%)	22%
	August 24, 2026	Heath Howard withdraws from the race									
University of New Hampshire	August 20–24, 2026	463 (LV)	± 4.6%	11%	1%	10%	19%	24%	4%	1% (Note: "Write someone else in" with 1%)	29%
Saint Anselm College	August 17–18, 2026	359 (LV)	± 5.2%	12%	0%	7%	24%	26%	3%	–	27%
Saint Anselm College	June 24–25, 2026	398 (RV)	± 4.9%	3%	1%	9%	22%	15%	3%	–	47%
University of New Hampshire	January 15–19, 2026	893 (LV)	± 3.3%	3%	3%	10%	33%	8%	3%	1% (Note: Alice Wade with 1%; Bill Conlin with 0%)	39%
Saint Anselm College	November 18–19, 2025	501 (RV)	± 4.4%	1%	1%	4%	26%	6%	1%	–	61%
University of New Hampshire	September 17–23, 2025	236 (LV)	–	2%	2%	4%	29%	8%	4%	–	52%
Saint Anselm College	August 26–27, 2025	413 (RV)	± 4.8%	2%	1%	4%	23%	9%	2%	–	59%

==== Results ====
Primary results by municipality: Shaheen: 30–40%; 40–50%; Sullivan: 30–40%; 40–50%; 50–60%; 60–70%; Beriont: 30–40%; 40–50%; 70–80%; Tie: 30–40%

Democratic primary results
Party	Candidate	Votes	%
Democratic	Stefany Shaheen	29,571	36.9
Democratic	Maura Sullivan	27,859	34.7
Democratic	Carleigh Beriont	18,032	22.5
Democratic	Christian Urrutia (withdrawn)	1,220	1.5
Democratic	Sarah Chadzynski	1,170	1.5
Democratic	Heath Howard (withdrawn)	848	1.1
Democratic	Sarah Bella Spinosa	555	0.7
Democratic	Bill Conlin	455	0.6
Democratic	Matthew Emerson	348	0.4
Write-in		116	0.1
Total votes		80,174	100.0

=== Republican primary ===
==== Nominee ====
- Anthony DiLorenzo, auto dealer

==== Eliminated in primary ====
- Lindsey Anderson, chairman emeritus of the MIT Sloan CIO Symposium
- Brian Cole, state representative from the Hillsborough 26th district (2022–present)
- Hollie Noveletsky, former vice chair of the New Hampshire Republican Party and candidate for this district in 2024

==== Withdrawn ====
- Melissa Bailey, vice chair of the Bedford Republican Committee (remained on ballot; endorsed DiLorenzo)
- Chris Bright, facilities management executive and candidate for this district in 2024
- Elizabeth Girard, former New Hampshire co-chair for the Donald Trump 2024 presidential campaign

==== Declined ====
- Karoline Leavitt, former White House Press Secretary (2025–2026) and nominee for this district in 2022
- Joseph Levasseur, at-large Manchester alder and candidate for this district in 2024
- Jay Ruais, mayor of Manchester (2023–present)

==== Endorsements ====
Anthony DiLorenzo

Executive branch officials

- Donald Trump, 45th and 47th president of the United States (2017–2021, 2025–present)

U.S. representatives

- Tom Emmer, House majority whip (2023–present) from MN-06 (2015–present)
- Frank Guinta, former NH-02 (2011–2013, 2015–2017)
- Mike Johnson, speaker of the House (2023–present) from LA-04 (2017–present)
- Jim Jordan, OH-04 (2007–present)
- Lisa McClain, MI-09 (2021–present)
- Steve Scalise, House majority leader (2023–present) from LA-01 (2008–present)

New Hampshire cabinet officials

- Russell Prescott, former New Hampshire Executive Councilor from the 3rd district (2017–2021) and nominee for this seat in 2024

Party officials

- Stephen Stepanek, former chair of the New Hampshire Republican Party (2019–2023)

Organizations

- National Republican Congressional Committee
- Turning Point Action
- U.S. Chamber of Commerce
Hollie Noveletsky

U.S. senators

- Bob Smith, former New Hampshire (1990–2003)

State legislators

- Regina Birdsell, majority leader of the New Hampshire Senate (2024–present) from the 19th district (2014–present)

Local officials

- George Hansel, former mayor of Keene (2020–2024) and candidate for NH-02 in 2022

Organizations

- Associated Builders and Contractors
- Maggie's List

==== Fundraising ====
Italics indicate a withdrawn candidate.

Campaign finance reports as of March 31, 2026
Candidate	Raised	Spent	Cash on hand
Melissa Bailey (R)	$229,363	$72,850	$156,513
Chris Bright (R)	$24,604	$25,139	$1,313
Brian Cole (R)	$370,224	$183,622	$186,601
Anthony DiLorenzo (R)	$1,290,475	$463,208	$827,267
Elizabeth Girard (R)	$177,619	$177,619	$0
Hollie Noveletsky (R)	$441,458	$35,648	$405,810
Source: Federal Election Commission

==== Polling ====
Poll source	Date(s) administered	Sample size	Margin of error	Melissa Bailey	Chris Bright	Brian Cole	Anthony DiLorenzo	Elizabeth Girard	Holly Noveletsky	Other	Undecided
University of New Hampshire	August 20–24, 2026	464 (LV)	± 4.5%	–	–	7%	25%	–	28%	1% (Note: Lindsey Anderson with 1%)	38%
Saint Anselm College	August 17–18, 2026	351 (LV)	± 5.2%	1%	–	8%	30%	–	17%	1% (Note: Lindsey Anderson with 1%)	44%
	July 16, 2026	Melissa Bailey withdraws from the race									
Saint Anselm College	June 24–25, 2026	377 (RV)	± 5.0%	2%	–	8%	13%	–	16%	–	61%
University of New Hampshire	January 15–19, 2026	967 (LV)	± 3.2%	4%	–	4%	10%	2%	15%	2% (Note: "Write in someone else" at 2%)	66%
	January 4, 2026	Elizabeth Girard withdraws from the race									
Saint Anselm College	November 18–19, 2025	521 (RV)	± 4.3%	2%	–	5%	4%	2%	5%	–	81%
	September 25, 2025	Chris Bright withdraws from the race									
University of New Hampshire	September 17–23, 2025	256 (LV)	± 4.2%	0%	10%	5%	–	–	10%	3% (Note: "Write in someone else" at 3%)	71%
Saint Anselm College	August 26–27, 2025	427 (RV)	± 4.7%	3%	8%	5%	–	–	–	–	84%

==== Results ====
Republican primary results
Party	Candidate	Votes	%
Republican	Anthony DiLorenzo	29,409	51.5
Republican	Hollie Noveletsky	14,980	26.2
Republican	Brian Cole	8,050	14.1
Republican	Melissa Bailey (withdrawn)	2,313	4.0
Republican	Lindsey Anderson	1,935	3.4
Write-in		452	0.8
Total votes		57,139	100.0

=== General election ===
==== Predictions ====
Source	Ranking	As of
Decision Desk HQ	Likely D	July 14, 2026
The Cook Political Report	Likely D	February 6, 2025
Inside Elections	Lean D	March 7, 2025
Sabato's Crystal Ball	Likely D	October 20, 2026

==== Post-primary endorsements ====
Stefany Shaheen (D)

U.S. representatives

- Greg Stanton, AZ-04 (2019–present)

Individuals

- Don Bolduc, retired brigadier general and Republican 2022 U.S. Senate nominee (Republican)

Labor unions

- American Federation of Government Employees

Organizations

- EMILYs List
- NewDem Action Fund

==== Fundraising ====
Campaign finance reports as of October 14, 2026
Candidate	Raised	Spent	Cash on hand
Stefany Shaheen (D)	$3,247,792	$2,977,060	$270,733
Anthony DiLorenzo (R)	$6,762,643	$5,778,850	$983,794
Source: Federal Election Commission

==== Polling ====
Poll source	Date(s) administered	Sample size	Margin of error	Stefany Shaheen (D)	Anthony DiLorenzo (R)	Other	Undecided
Saint Anselm College	October 19–20, 2026	861 (LV)	± 3.3%	46%	42%	6% (Note: "Other" with 6%)	6%
University of New Hampshire	September 17–21, 2026	711 (LV)	± 3.7%	46%	42%	0% (Note: "Another Candidate" with 0%)	11%

== District 2 ==
2026 New Hampshire's 2nd congressional district election
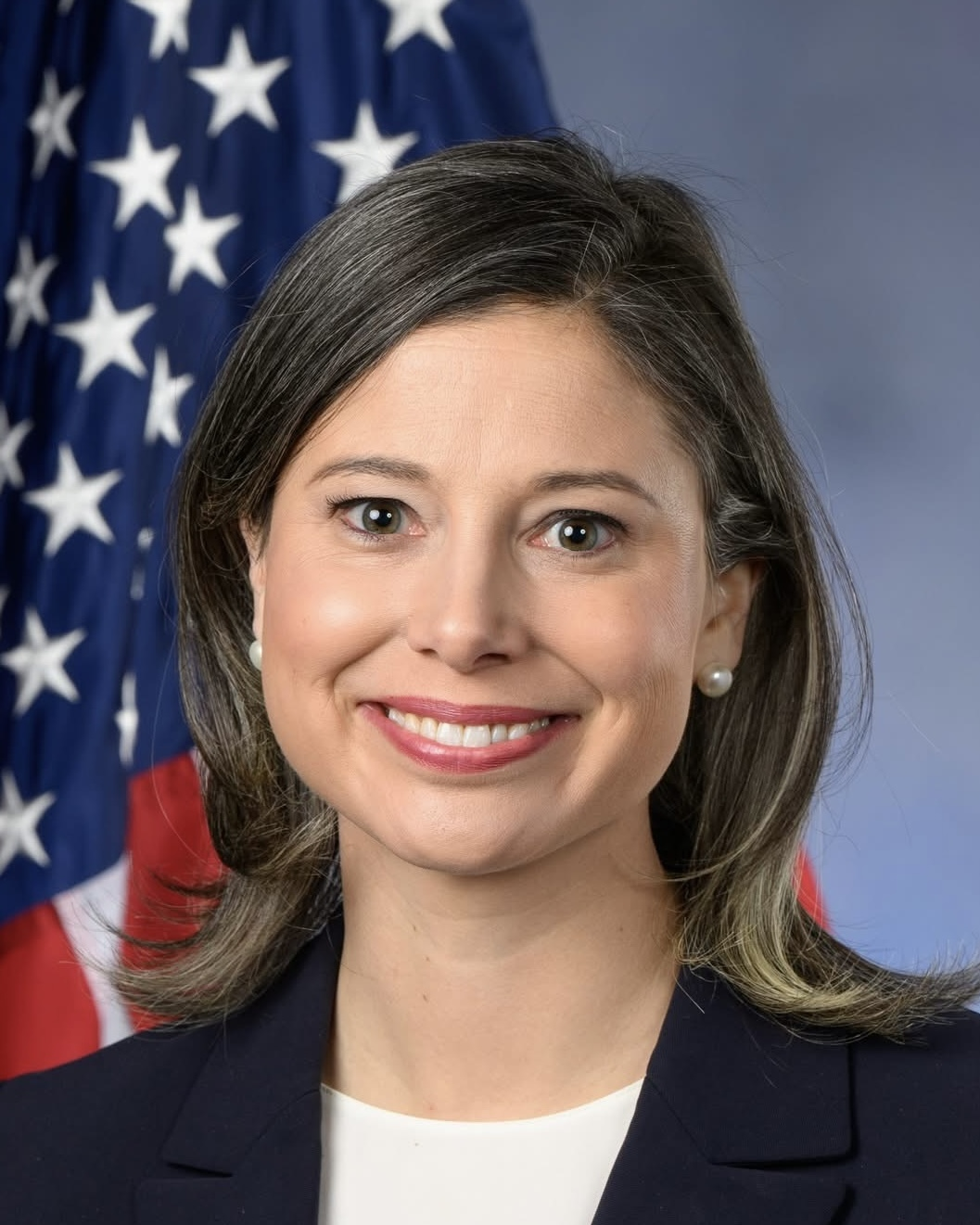

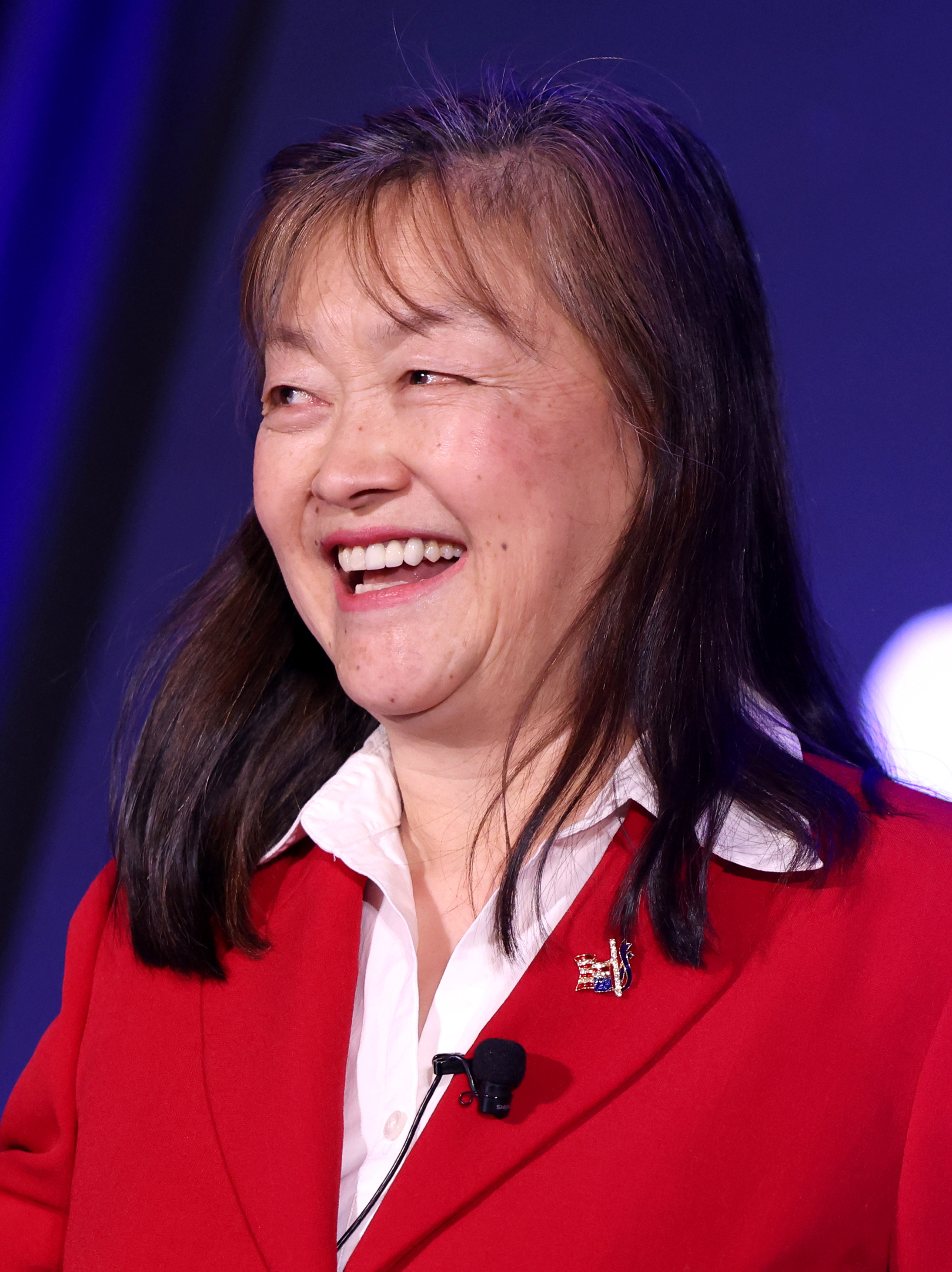
Nominee	Maggie Goodlander	Lily Tang Williams
Party	Democratic	Republican
Popular vote	185,900	122,645
Percentage	58.82%	38.81%
- Municipality results Goodlander: 40–50% 50–60% 60–70% 70–80% 80–90% Tang Williams: 40–50% 50–60% 60–70% 70–80% No votes
U.S. Representative before election
Maggie Goodlander
Democratic
Elected U.S. Representative
Maggie Goodlander
Democratic

The 2nd district encompasses western and northern New Hampshire, and includes the cities of Nashua and Concord. The incumbent is Democrat Maggie Goodlander, who was elected with 52.9% of the vote in 2024.

=== Democratic primary ===
==== Nominee ====
- Maggie Goodlander, incumbent U.S. representative

==== Eliminated in primary ====
- Paige Beauchemin, state representative from the Hillsborough 3rd district (2023–present)

==== Endorsements ====
Paige Beauchemin (D)

Organizations

- College Democrats of America
- Peace Action
- Track AIPAC
Maggie Goodlander (D)

U.S. representatives

- Chris Pappas, NH-01 (2019–present)

Statewide officials

- Mikie Sherrill, governor of New Jersey (2026–present)

Labor unions

- SEIU Local 1984 (Democratic primary only)

Organizations

- AIPAC
- End Citizens United
- Giffords
- J Street
- Jewish Democratic Council of America
- Joint Action Committee for Political Affairs
- League of Conservation Voters
- Planned Parenthood Action Fund

==== Fundraising ====
Campaign finance reports as of March 31, 2026
Candidate	Raised	Spent	Cash on hand
Paige Beauchemin (D)	$19,477	$16,763	$2,713
Maggie Goodlander (D)	$2,972,341	$984,208	$2,046,131
Source: Federal Election Commission

==== Polling ====
Poll source	Date(s) administered	Sample size	Margin of error	Maggie Goodlander	Paige Beauchemin	Undecided
University of New Hampshire	August 20–24, 2026	430 (LV)	± 4.7%	59%	19%	22%
Saint Anselm College	August 17–18, 2026	374 (LV)	± 5.1%	66%	17%	17%
Saint Anselm College	June 24–25, 2026	412 (RV)	± 4.8%	76%	9%	15%
University of New Hampshire	January 15–19, 2026	893 (LV)	± 3.3%	66%	12%	22%
Saint Anselm College	November 18–19, 2025	515 (RV)	± 4.3%	62%	6%	32%

==== Results ====
Democratic primary results
Party	Candidate	Votes	%
Democratic	Maggie Goodlander (incumbent)	59,817	81.8
Democratic	Paige Beauchemin	13,205	18.0
Write-in		145	0.2
Total votes		73,167	100.0

=== Republican primary ===
==== Nominee ====
- Lily Tang Williams, former chair of the Colorado Libertarian Party, nominee for this district in 2024 and candidate in 2022, and Libertarian nominee for U.S. Senate in Colorado in 2016

==== Eliminated in primary ====
- Michael A. Callis, stone mason and candidate for this district in 2024
- Dan Nicholson
- Victor Orlando, construction company owner

==== Endorsements ====
Victor Orlando

Labor unions

- SEIU Local 1984 (Republican primary only)
Lily Tang Williams

State legislators

- 4 state senators (Note: Kevin Avard, New Hampshire's 12th State Senate district (2020–present); Keith Murphy, New Hampshire's 16th State Senate district (2022–present); Victoria Sullivan, New Hampshire's 18th State Senate district (2024–present); Ruth Ward, New Hampshire's 8th State Senate district (2016–present))
- 1 former state senator (Note: Bob Giuda, New Hampshire's 2nd State Senate district (2016–2022))
- 39 state representatives (Note: Calvin Beaulier, Grafton 1st (2024–present); Mike Belcher, Carroll 4th (2022–present); Glenn Cordelli, Carroll 7th (2022–present); Seth King, Coos 4th (2022–present); Lisa Mazur, Hillsborough 44th (2022–present); Donald McFarlane, Grafton 18th (2022–present); Rich Nalevanko, Cheshire 9th (2024–present); Katy Peternel, Carroll 6th (2022–present); Paul Terry, Belknap 7th (2022–present); Mark Warden, Hillsborough 39th (2024–present))

Organizations

- Log Cabin Republicans
- MAHA Action

==== Fundraising ====
Campaign finance reports as of March 31, 2026
Candidate	Raised	Spent	Cash on hand
Lily Tang Williams (R)	$869,483	$425,033	$573,929
Source: Federal Election Commission

==== Polling ====
Poll source	Date(s) administered	Sample size	Margin of error	Lily Tang Williams	Victor Orlando	Other	Undecided
University of New Hampshire	August 20–24, 2026	387 (LV)	± 5.0%	58%	2%	3% (Note: Michael Callis, Dan Nicholson, and "Write in someone else" with 1%)	38%
Saint Anselm College	August 17–18, 2026	327 (LV)	± 5.4%	53%	7%	0% (Note: Dan Nicholson with 0%)	40%
Saint Anselm College	June 24–25, 2026	362 (RV)	± 5.2%	56%	7%	–	38%

==== Results ====
Republican primary results
Party	Candidate	Votes	%
Republican	Lily Tang Williams	31,402	64.9
Republican	Dan Nicholson	6,471	13.4
Republican	Victor Orlando	6,309	13.0
Republican	Michael A. Callis	3,808	7.9
Write-in		428	0.9
Total votes		48,418	100.0

=== Third-party and independent candidates ===
==== Nominee ====
- Robbie Mahrou (Independent), entrepreneur

=== General election ===
==== Predictions ====
Source	Ranking	As of
Decision Desk HQ	Likely D	July 14, 2026
The Cook Political Report	Solid D	July 16, 2026
Inside Elections	Solid D	October 29, 2026
Sabato's Crystal Ball	Likely D	July 15, 2025

==== Post-primary endorsements ====
Maggie Goodlander (D)

Labor unions

- American Federation of Government Employees
- National Education Association
Robbie Mahrou (I)

Political parties

- Forward Party

==== Fundraising ====
Campaign finance reports as of October 14, 2026
Candidate	Raised	Spent	Cash on hand
Maggie Goodlander (D)	$5,012,909	$3,249,344	$1,821,563
Lily Tang Williams (R)	$1,443,796	$1,101,045	$472,230
Source: Federal Election Commission

==== Polling ====
Poll source	Date(s) administered	Sample size	Margin of error	Maggie Goodlander (D)	Lily Tang Williams (R)	Other	Undecided
Saint Anselm College	October 19–20, 2026	811 (LV)	± 3.4%	54%	38%	3% (Note: "Other" with 3%)	5%
University of New Hampshire	September 17–21, 2026	702 (LV)	± 3.7%	56%	35%	3% (Note: Robbie Mahrou (I) with 3%; "Another Candidate" with 0%)	6%
	September 8, 2026	Primary elections are held					
Saint Anselm College	August 17–18, 2026	701 (LV)	± 3.7%	50%	35%	–	16%
Saint Anselm College	June 24–25, 2026	802 (RV)	± 3.5%	50%	31%	–	19%
Saint Anselm College	March 16–18, 2026	739 (RV)	± 3.6%	48%	36%	–	16%
University of New Hampshire	January 15–19, 2026	1,093 (LV)	± 3.0%	54%	40%	2% (Note: "Another candidate" at 2%)	3%
Saint Anselm College	November 18–19, 2025	1,102 (RV)	± 3.0%	40%	35%	–	25%
University of New Hampshire	September 17–23, 2025	659 (LV)	± 4.3%	51%	39%	2%	8%
Saint Anselm College	August 26–27, 2025	881 (RV)	± 3.3%	49%	31%	–	20%
