= 2024 United States House of Representatives elections in New Hampshire =

- November 5, 2024

Both New Hampshire seats to the United States House of Representatives
	Majority party	Minority party
Party	Democratic	Republican
Last election	2	0
Seats won	2	0
Seat change	Steady	Steady
Popular vote	430,218	373,746
Percentage	53.47%	46.45%
Swing	▼1.43%	▲1.46%

Democratic
50–60%
60–70%
70–80%
80–90%
Republican
50–60%
60–70%
70–80%

The 2024 United States House of Representatives elections in New Hampshire were held on November 5, 2024, to elect the two U.S. representatives from the state of New Hampshire, one from each of the state's two congressional districts. Primary elections took place on September 10, 2024.

== Overview ==
=== Statewide ===
Party	Candi- dates	Votes		Seats		
Party	Candi- dates	No.	%	No.	+/–	%
Democratic Party	2	430,218	53.47%	2	Steady	100%
Republican Party	2	373,746	46.45%	0	Steady	0%
Write-ins	–	662	0.08%	0	Steady	0%
Total	4	804,626	100%	2	Steady	100%

Popular vote
Democratic	53.47%
Republican	46.45%
Other	0.08%

House seats
Democratic	100.0%

=== District ===
District	Democratic		Republican		Others		Total		Result
District	Votes	%	Votes	%	Votes	%	Votes	%	Result
District 1	218,577	54.00%	185,936	45.93%	295	0.07%	404,808	100.0%	Democratic hold
District 1	211,641	52.93%	187,810	46.97%	367	0.09%	399,818	100.0%	Democratic hold
Total	430,218	53.47%	373,746	46.45%	662	0.08%	804,626	100.0%	

== District 1 ==
2024 New Hampshire's 1st congressional district election
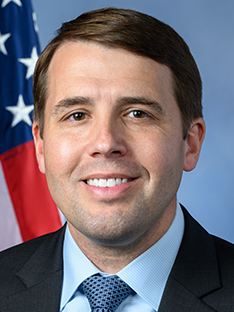

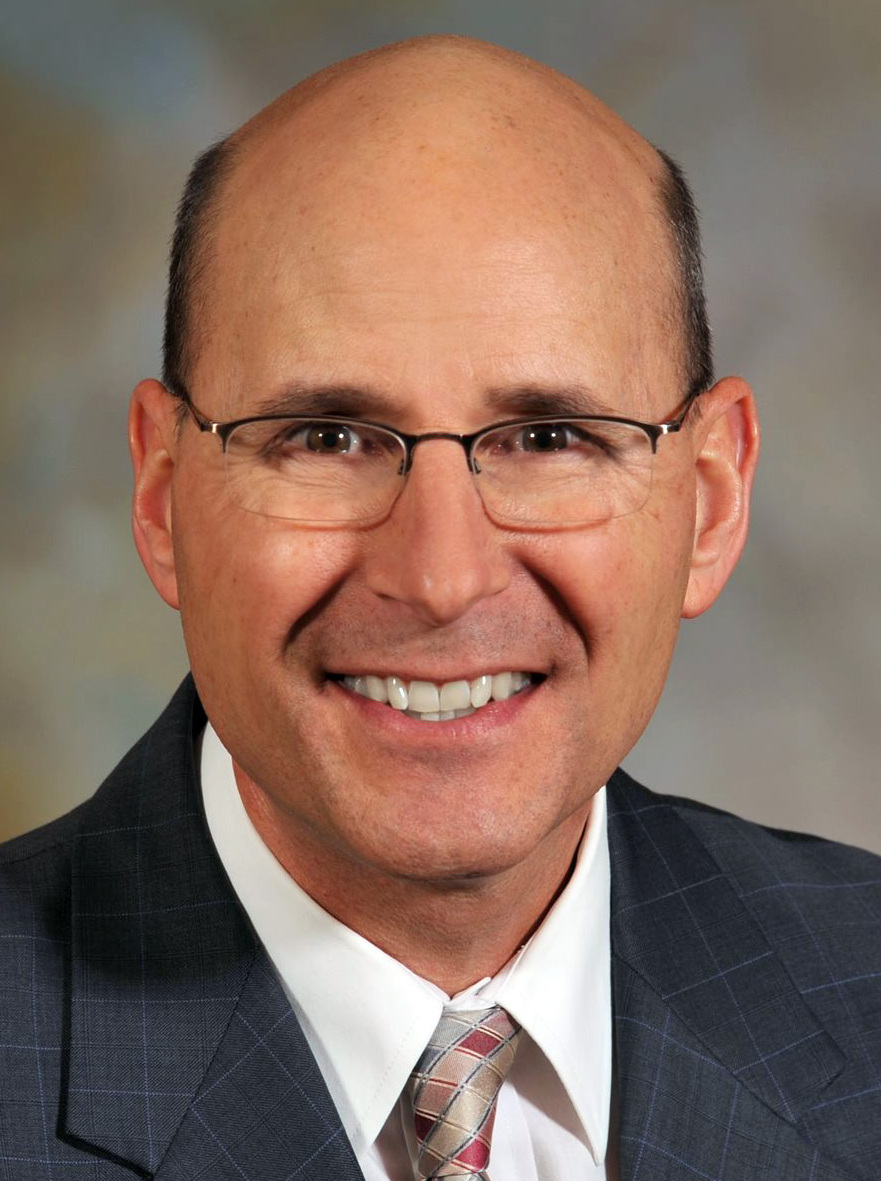
Nominee	Chris Pappas	Russell Prescott
Party	Democratic	Republican
Popular vote	218,577	185,936
Percentage	54.0%	45.9%
- Pappas: 50–60% 60–70% 70–80% Prescott: 50–60% 60–70%
U.S. Representative before election
Chris Pappas
Democratic
Elected U.S. Representative
Chris Pappas
Democratic

The 1st district is based in southeastern New Hampshire, and includes Greater Manchester, the Seacoast and the Lakes Region. The incumbent was Democrat Chris Pappas, who was re-elected with 54.00% of the vote in 2022.

=== Democratic primary ===
==== Nominee ====
- Chris Pappas, incumbent U.S. representative

==== Eliminated in primary ====
- Kevin Rondeau, perennial candidate

==== Endorsements ====
Chris Pappas

Individuals

- Kelley Robinson, president of Human Rights Campaign

Organizations

- AIPAC
- Brady PAC
- Democratic Majority for Israel
- End Citizens United
- Everytown for Gun Safety Action Fund
- Feminist Majority PAC
- Giffords
- Human Rights Campaign
- Jewish Democratic Council of America
- League of Conservation Voters
- LGBTQ Victory Fund
- NARAL Pro-Choice America
- Natural Resources Defense Council
- NextGen America PAC
- Planned Parenthood Action Fund
- Population Connection Action Fund
- U.S. Chamber of Commerce

Labor unions

- National Education Association

==== Fundraising ====
Campaign finance reports as of March 31, 2024
Candidate	Raised	Spent	Cash on hand
Chris Pappas (D)	$2,171,957	$534,752	$1,750,431
Source: Federal Election Commission

==== Results ====
Democratic primary results
Party	Candidate	Votes	%
Democratic	Chris Pappas (incumbent)	54,950	95.2
Democratic	Kevin Rondeau	2,783	4.8
Total votes		57,733	100.0

=== Republican primary ===
==== Nominee ====
- Russell Prescott, former executive councilor (2017–2021) and candidate for this district in 2022

==== Eliminated in primary ====
- Max Abramson, former state representative (2014–2016, 2018–2022) and Libertarian nominee for governor in 2016
- Chris Bright, facilities management executive
- Joseph Levasseur, at-large Manchester alder
- Andy Martin, attorney and perennial candidate
- Walter McFarlane, financial consultant
- Hollie Noveletsky, steel fabrication company CEO

==== Declined ====
- Tim Baxter, former state representative (2020–2022) and candidate for this district in 2022
- Karoline Leavitt, press secretary for the Donald Trump 2024 presidential campaign and nominee for this district in 2022

==== Endorsements ====
Hollie Noveletsky

Organizations

- Associated Builders and Contractors NH/VT Chapter
Russell Prescott

State legislators

- 6 former state senators
- 29 current and former state representatives

Organizations

- College Republicans of America
- Log Cabin Republicans PAC
- National Federation of Independent Business

==== Fundraising ====
Campaign finance reports as of March 31, 2024
Candidate	Raised	Spent	Cash on hand
Chris Bright (R)	$182,824 (Note: $105,000 of this total was self-funded by Bright)	$95,222	$87,603
Hollie Noveletsky (R)	$302,843 (Note: $65,000 of this total was self-funded by Noveletsky)	$66,734	$236,108
Russell Prescott (R)	$664,059 (Note: $450,000 of this total was self-funded by Prescott)	$150,615	$513,444
Source: Federal Election Commission

==== Polling ====
Poll source	Date(s) administered	Sample size (Note: Key: A – all adults RV – registered voters LV – likely voters V – unclear)	Margin of error	Chris Bright	Joseph Levasseur	Hollie Noveletsky	Russell Prescott	Other	Undecided
University of New Hampshire	August 15–19, 2024	418 (LV)	± 3.2%	4%	10%	4%	19%	2% (Note: Max Abramson with 1%; Walter McFarlane and Andy Martin with 0%; "Someone else" with 1%)	60%
Saint Anselm College	August 13–14, 2024	340 (LV)	± 5.3%	5%	15%	9%	10%	3% (Note: "Someone else" with 3%)	59%

==== Results ====
Results by township: Prescott—20–30% Prescott—30–40% Prescott—40–50% Noveletsky—20–30% Noveletsky—30–40% Noveletsky—40–50% Noveletsky—50–60% Levasseur—20–30% Levasseur—30–40% Levasseur—40–50% Levasseur—50–60%

Republican primary results
Party	Candidate	Votes	%
Republican	Russell Prescott	17,408	26.1
Republican	Hollie Noveletsky	15,896	23.8
Republican	Joseph Levasseur	15,418	23.1
Republican	Chris Bright	8,823	13.2
Republican	Walter McFarlane	5,421	8.1
Republican	Max Abramson	2,180	3.3
Republican	Andy Martin	1,563	2.3
Total votes		66,709	100.0

=== General election ===
==== Predictions ====
Source	Ranking	As of
The Cook Political Report	Likely D	October 20, 2023
Inside Elections	Likely D	September 12, 2024
Sabato's Crystal Ball	Likely D	October 4, 2023
Elections Daily	Likely D	November 4, 2024
CNalysis	Likely D	November 16, 2023

==== Fundraising ====
Campaign finance reports as of December 31, 2024
Candidate	Raised	Spent	Cash on hand
Chris Pappas (D)	$4,069,100	$3,774,742	$407,584
Russell Prescott (R)	$1,505,457	$1,306,264	$199,726
Source: Federal Election Commission

==== Polling ====
Poll source	Date(s) administered	Sample size	Margin of error	Chris Pappas (D)	Russell Prescott (R)	Other	Undecided
Dartmouth College	November 1–3, 2024	253 (LV)	± 6.2%	62%	34%	3%	–
University of New Hampshire	October 29 – November 2, 2024	1,433 (LV)	± 2.6%	51%	39%	–	9%
Saint Anselm College	October 28–29, 2024	1,407 (LV)	± 2.6%	50%	43%	1%	6%
The Dartmouth Poll	October 5–18, 2024	977(RV)	± 3.1%	57%	41%	2%	–
Saint Anselm College	October 1–2, 2024	1,099 (LV)	± 3.0%	50%	41%	2%	6%
Cygnal (R) (Note: Poll sponsored by Prescott's campaign and the NRCC)	September 26–28, 2024	406 (LV)	± 4.85%	46%	42%	–	11%
University of New Hampshire	September 12–16, 2024	854 (LV)	± 3.4%	52%	35%	1% (Note: "Another candidate" with 1%)	12%
Saint Anselm College	September 11–12, 2024	1,130 (LV)	± 2.9%	50%	38%	3% (Note: "Someone else" with 3%)	8%

==== Results ====
2024 New Hampshire's 1st congressional district election
Party	Candidate	Votes	%
Democratic	Chris Pappas (incumbent)	218,577	54.0
Republican	Russell Prescott	185,936	45.9
Write-in		295	0.1
Total votes		404,808	100.0
Democratic hold			

== District 2 ==
2024 New Hampshire's 2nd congressional district election
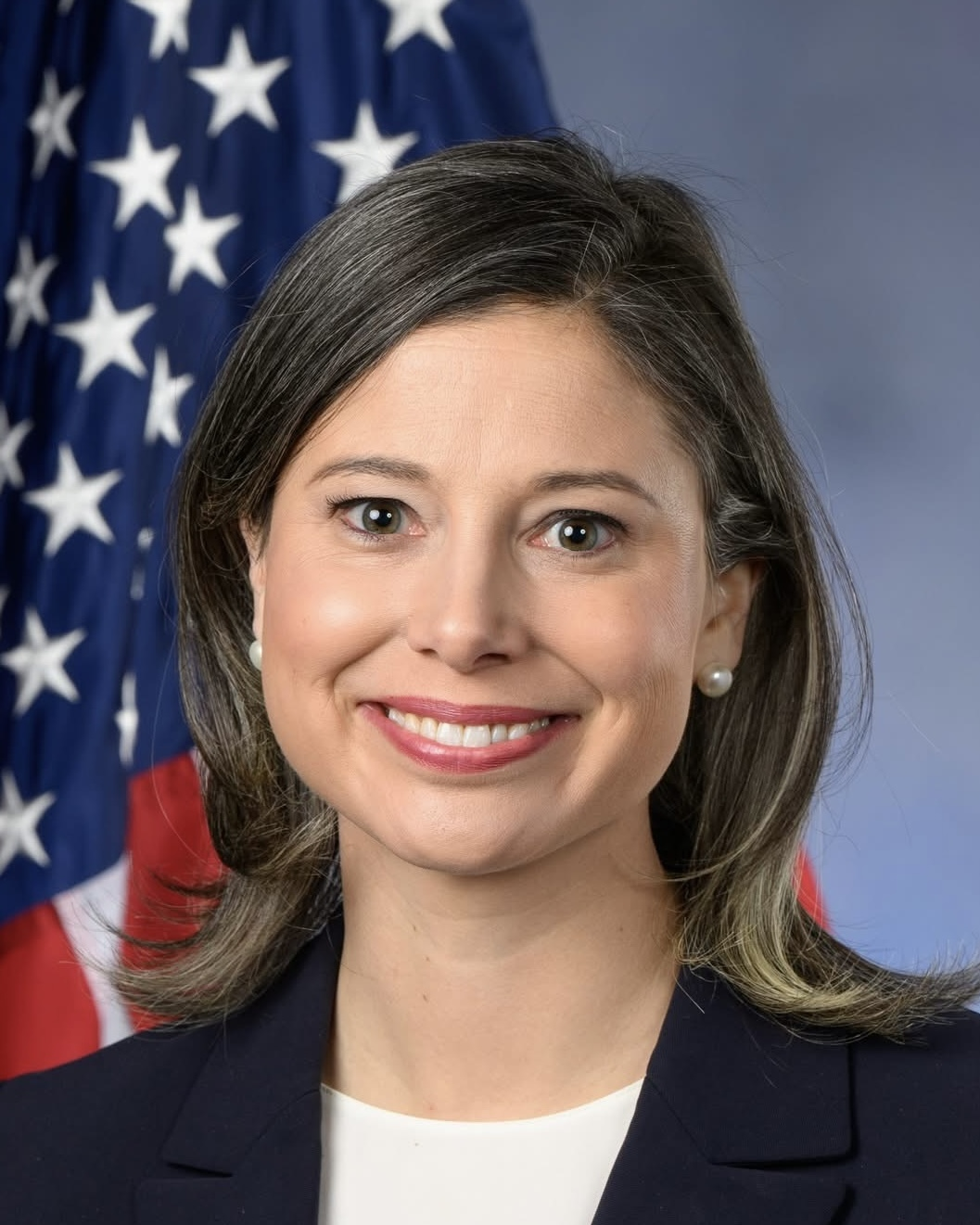

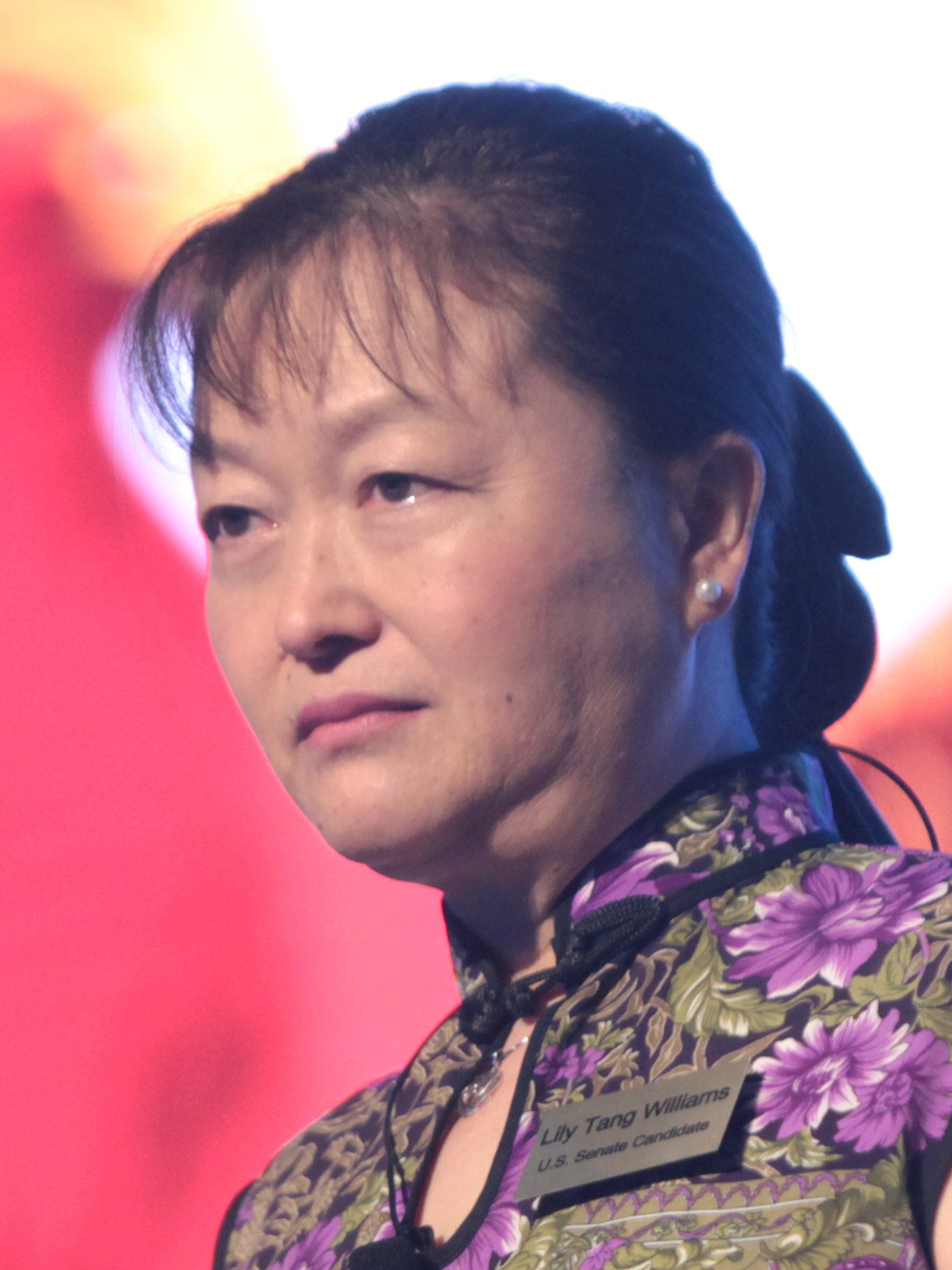
Nominee	Maggie Goodlander	Lily Tang Williams
Party	Democratic	Republican
Popular vote	211,641	187,810
Percentage	52.9%	47.0%
- Goodlander: 50–60% 60–70% 70–80% 80–90% >90% Williams: 50–60% 60–70% 70–80% >90% Tie: 50% No votes
U.S. Representative before election
Annie Kuster
Democratic
Elected U.S. Representative
Maggie Goodlander
Democratic

The 2nd district encompasses western and northern New Hampshire, and includes the cities of Nashua and Concord. The incumbent was Democrat Annie Kuster, who was re-elected with 55.80% of the vote in 2022.

=== Democratic primary ===
==== Nominee ====
- Maggie Goodlander, former U.S. deputy assistant attorney general (2021–2024) and wife of National Security Advisor Jake Sullivan

==== Eliminated in primary ====
- Colin Van Ostern, former Executive Councilor from the 2nd district (2013–2017) and nominee for governor of New Hampshire in 2016

==== Withdrawn ====
- Annie Kuster, incumbent U.S. representative (endorsed Van Ostern)
- Becky Whitley, state senator from the 15th district (2020–present)

==== Declined ====
- Jim Bouley, former mayor of Concord (2008–2024)
- Angela Brennan, state representative from the Merrimack 9th district (2022–present) (ran for state senate)
- Byron Champlin, mayor of Concord (2024–present) (endorsed Van Ostern)
- Donovan Fenton, state senator from the 10th district (2022–present)
- Gary Hirshberg, former CEO of Stonyfield Farm (endorsed Van Ostern, then Goodlander)
- Melanie Levesque, former state senator from the 12th district (2018–2020) (endorsed Van Ostern, ran for Executive Council)
- Karen Liot Hill, Grafton County treasurer (ran for Executive Council)
- Rebecca McWilliams, state representative from the Merrimack 27th district (2018–present) (ran for state senate)
- Jay Surdukowski, attorney

==== Endorsements ====
Maggie Goodlander

Federal officials

- Hillary Clinton, former U.S. secretary of state (2009–2013)
- Seth Moulton, U.S. representative from Massachusetts's 6th congressional district (2015–present)

Statewide officials

- John Lynch, former governor of New Hampshire (2005–2013) (previously endorsed Van Ostern)

Newspapers

- The Keene Sentinel

Individuals

- Gary Hirshberg, former CEO of Stonyfield Farm (previously endorsed Van Ostern)

Organizations

- Elect Democratic Women
- EMILY's List
- Everytown for Gun Safety (post-primary)
- VoteVets
- With Honor Fund
Colin Van Ostern

U.S. representatives

- Annie Kuster, incumbent U.S. representative for this district (2013–present)

Statewide officials

- ~~John Lynch, former governor of New Hampshire (2005–2013)~~ (switched endorsement to Goodlander)

State legislators

- Sylvia Larsen, former president of the New Hampshire Senate (2006–2010) from the 15th district (1994–2014)
- Melanie Levesque, former state senator from the 12th district (2018–2020)
- Suzanne Prentiss, state senator from the 5th district (2020–present)

Local officials

- Jay Kahn, mayor of Keene (2024–present)

Individuals

- ~~Gary Hirshberg, former CEO of Stonyfield Farm~~ (switched endorsement to Goodlander)

Organizations

- NewDem Action Fund
Annie Kuster (withdrawn)

Organizations

- Feminist Majority PAC
- J Street PAC
- Population Connection Action Fund
- Swing Left

Labor unions

- National Education Association

==== Fundraising ====
Campaign finance reports as of August 21, 2024
Candidate	Raised	Spent	Cash on hand
Colin Van Ostern (D)	$1,385,369	$816,084	$568,360
Maggie Goodlander (D)	$2,376,319	$1,567,739	$791,115
Source: Federal Election Commission

==== Polling ====
Poll source	Date(s) administered	Sample size (Note: Key: A – all adults RV – registered voters LV – likely voters V – unclear)	Margin of error	Maggie Goodlander	Colin Van Ostern	Other	Undecided
University of New Hampshire	August 15–19, 2024	371 (LV)	± 3.4%	34%	28%	–	38%
Public Policy Polling (D) (Note: Poll sponsored by Principles Veteran Fund super PAC, which supports Goodlander)	August 15–16, 2024	655 (LV)	–	36%	26%	–	38%
Saint Anselm College	August 13–14, 2024	320 (LV)	± 5.5%	41%	31%	0%	28%
GQR Research (D) (Note: Poll sponsored by EMILY's List, which supports Goodlander)	July 8–11, 2024	400 (LV)	± 4.88%	43%	27%	–	30%
Public Policy Polling (D)	June 8–9, 2024	693 (LV)	–	35%	13%	–	53%
Public Policy Polling (D) (Note: Poll sponsored by Van Ostern's campaign)	May 30–31, 2024	555 (LV)	–	10%	22%	9% (Note: Becky Whitley with 8%; Jason Neenos with 1%)	59%

==== Results ====
Democratic primary results
Party	Candidate	Votes	%
Democratic	Maggie Goodlander	42,960	64.0
Democratic	Colin Van Ostern	24,174	36.0
Total votes		67,134	100.0

=== Republican primary ===
==== Nominee ====
- Lily Tang Williams, former chair of the Colorado Libertarian Party, Libertarian nominee for U.S. Senate in Colorado in 2016, and candidate for this district in 2022

==== Eliminated in primary ====
- Tom Alciere, former state representative (2000–2001) and perennial candidate
- Gerard Beloin, roofing contractor and perennial candidate
- Michael Callis, landscaping contractor and perennial candidate
- Randall Clark, attorney
- Casey Crane, former state representative (2002–2008)
- Robert D'Arcy, custodian and perennial candidate
- Bill Hamlen, oil executive
- William Harvey
- Vikram Mansharamani, business consultant and candidate for U.S. Senate in 2022
- Jay Mercer, physician's assistant and perennial candidate
- Jason Riddle, U.S. Navy veteran and participant in the January 6 United States Capitol attack
- Paul Wagner, attorney

==== Declined ====
- Daryl Abbas, state senator from the 22nd district (2022–present)
- Robert Burns, former Hillsborough County treasurer and nominee for this district in 2022 (ran for Executive Council)
- Frank Edelblut, commissioner of the New Hampshire Department of Education (2017–present), former state representative (2014–2016), and candidate for governor in 2016
- George Hansel, former mayor of Keene (2020–2024) and candidate for this district in 2022

==== Endorsements ====
Vikram Mansharamani

Organizations

- Republican Main Street Partnership PAC
Lily Tang Williams

U.S. representatives

- Elise Stefanik, U.S. representative NY-21

Statewide officials

- Chris Sununu, governor of New Hampshire (2017–present)

State legislators

- 52 state legislators

Organizations

- Maggie's List

Individuals

- Robert F. Kennedy Jr., former 2024 independent presidential candidate

==== Fundraising ====
Campaign finance reports as of March 31, 2024
Candidate	Raised	Spent	Cash on hand
Vikram Mansharamani (R)	$0	$9,483	$1,043
Lily Tang Williams (R)	$211,091 (Note: $50,000 of this total was self-funded by Williams.)	$7,638	$234,246
Source: Federal Election Commission

==== Polling ====
Poll source	Date(s) administered	Sample size	Margin of error	Bill Hamlen	Vikram Mansharamani	Jay Mercer	Lily Tang Williams	Other	Undecided
University of New Hampshire	August 15–19, 2024	434 (LV)	± 3.2%	4%	21%	5%	17%	4% (Note: Randall Clark and Jason Riddle with 1%; Tom Alciere, Michael Callis, Casey Crane, Robert D'Arcy, and Paul Wagner with 0%; "Someone else" with 2%)	49%
Saint Anselm College	August 13–14, 2024	318 (LV)	± 5.5%	6%	16%	–	16%	3% (Note: Casey Crane with 2%; "Someone else" with 3%)	57%

==== Results ====
Republican primary results
Party	Candidate	Votes	%
Republican	Lily Tang Williams	22,040	35.9
Republican	Vikram Mansharamani	16,565	27.0
Republican	Bill Hamlen	9,860	16.1
Republican	Paul Wagner	2,329	3.8
Republican	Casey Crane	2,046	3.3
Republican	Randall Clark	1,866	3.0
Republican	William Harvey	1,743	2.8
Republican	Jay Mercer	1,573	2.6
Republican	Jason Riddle	869	1.4
Republican	Robert D'Arcy	714	1.2
Republican	Michael Callis	632	1.0
Republican	Tom Alciere	623	1.0
Republican	Gerard Belloin	552	0.9
Total votes		61,412	100.0

=== Independents ===
==== Filed paperwork ====
- Ryan Donnelly, custom van builder

=== General election ===
==== Debate ====
2024 New Hampshire's 2nd congressional district debate
No.	Date	Host	Moderator	Link	Democratic	Republican
Key: P Participant A Absent N Not invited I Invited W Withdrawn						
Key: P Participant A Absent N Not invited I Invited W Withdrawn					Maggie Goodlander	Lily Tang Williams
1	Oct. 31, 2024	WMUR-TV	Adam Sexton	YouTube (Part 1); YouTube (Part 2)	P	P

==== Predictions ====
Source	Ranking	As of
The Cook Political Report	Solid D	November 1, 2024
Inside Elections	Solid D	September 12, 2024
Sabato's Crystal Ball	Likely D	October 4, 2023
Elections Daily	Likely D	September 7, 2023
CNalysis	Very Likely D	August 18, 2024

==== Polling ====
Poll source	Date(s) administered	Sample size	Margin of error	Maggie Goodlander (D)	Lily Tang Williams (R)	Other	Undecided
Dartmouth College	November 1–3, 2024	329 (LV)	± 5.4%	64%	34%	2%	–
University of New Hampshire	October 29 – November 2, 2024	1,359 (LV)	± 2.7%	53%	39%	–	8%
Saint Anselm College	October 28–29, 2024	1,384 (LV)	± 2.6%	51%	43%	1%	5%
The Dartmouth Poll	October 5–18, 2024	1,206(RV)	± 3.1%	59%	38%	2%	–
Saint Anselm College	October 1–2, 2024	1,005 (LV)	± 3.1%	50%	38%	3%	8%
University of New Hampshire	September 12–16, 2024	834 (LV)	± 3.4%	49%	38%	1% (Note: "Another candidate" with 1%)	12%
Saint Anselm College	September 11–12, 2024	1,130 (LV)	± 2.9%	49%	38%	3% (Note: "Someone else" with 3%)	11%

==== Results ====
2024 New Hampshire's 2nd congressional district election
Party	Candidate	Votes	%
Democratic	Maggie Goodlander	211,641	52.9
Republican	Lily Tang Williams	187,810	47.0
Write-in		367	0.1
Total votes		399,818	100.0
Democratic hold			

== Notes ==
Partisan clients
