= 2022 United States House of Representatives elections in New Hampshire =

- November 8, 2022

All 2 New Hampshire seats to the United States House of Representatives
	Majority party	Minority party
Party	Democratic	Republican
Last election	2	0
Seats won	2	0
Seat change	Steady	Steady
Popular vote	339,027	277,808
Percentage	54.90%	44.99%
Swing	▲2.31%	▲0.01%

Democratic
50–60%
60–70%
70–80%
80–90%
90–100%
Republican
50–60%
60–70%
70–80%
Tie
40–50%
50%

The 2022 United States House of Representatives elections in New Hampshire were held on November 8, 2022, to elect the two U.S. representatives from the state of New Hampshire, one from each of the state's two congressional districts.

== Overview ==
District	Democratic		Republican		Others		Total		Result
District	Votes	%	Votes	%	Votes	%	Votes	%	Result
District 1	167,391	54.00%	142,229	45.89%	342	0.11%	309,962	100.00%	Democratic hold
District 2	171,636	55.80%	135,579	44.08%	369	0.12%	307,584	100.00%	Democratic hold
Total	339,027	54.90%	277,808	44.99%	711	0.11%	617,546	100.00%	

Popular vote
Democratic	54.90%
Republican	44.99%
Other	0.11%

House seats
Democratic	100.00%

== District 1 ==
2022 New Hampshire's 1st congressional district election
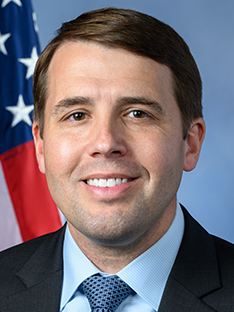

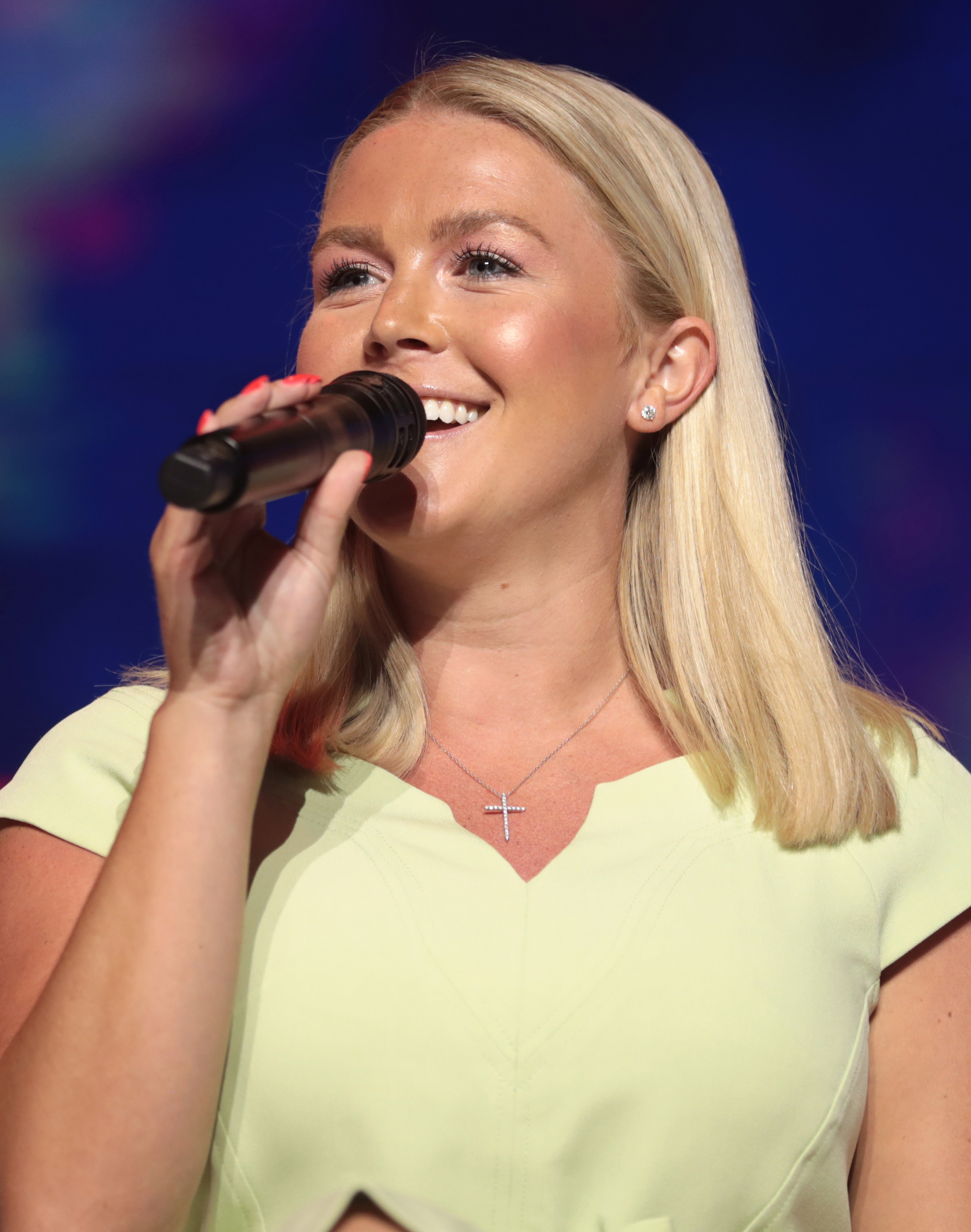
Nominee	Chris Pappas	Karoline Leavitt
Party	Democratic	Republican
Popular vote	167,391	142,229
Percentage	54.0%	45.9%
- Municipality results Pappas: 50–60% 60–70% 70–80% 80–90% Leavitt: 50–60% 60–70%
U.S. Representative before election
Chris Pappas
Democratic
Elected U.S. Representative
Chris Pappas
Democratic

The 1st district is based in southeastern New Hampshire, and includes Greater Manchester, the Seacoast and the Lakes Region. The incumbent was Democrat Chris Pappas, who was re-elected with 51.3% of the vote in 2020.

=== Democratic primary ===
==== Candidates ====
===== Nominee =====
- Chris Pappas, incumbent U.S. Representative

==== Endorsements ====
Chris Pappas

Organizations

- American Israel Public Affairs Committee
- End Citizens United
- Giffords
- League of Conservation Voters
- LGBTQ Victory Fund
- NARAL Pro-Choice America
- Planned Parenthood Action Fund
- Population Connection Action Fund
- Pro-Israel America
- Sierra Club

==== Results ====
Democratic primary results
Party	Candidate	Votes	%
Democratic	Chris Pappas (incumbent)	41,990	100.0
Total votes		41,990	100.0

=== Republican primary ===
==== Candidates ====
===== Nominee =====
- Karoline Leavitt, former assistant White House press secretary

===== Eliminated in primary =====
- Tom Alciere, former state representative and perennial candidate
- Tim Baxter, state representative
- Gail Huff Brown, news correspondent and wife of former U.S. Senator from Massachusetts Scott Brown
- Mark Kilbane, businessman
- Mary Maxwell
- Matt Mowers, former chair of the New Hampshire Republican Party and nominee for this district in 2020
- Russell Prescott, former Executive Councillor
- Kevin Rondeau
- Gilead Towne, sales associate

===== Withdrawn =====
- Julian Acciard, security specialist and Iraq War veteran (running for governor)

==== Endorsements ====
Tim Baxter

U.S. senators

- Rand Paul, U.S. Senator from Kentucky (2011–present)

U.S. representatives

- Thomas Massie, U.S. Representative from Kentucky's 4th congressional district (2012–present)
- Dana Rohrabacher, former U.S. Representative from California's 48th congressional district (1989–2019)

State representatives

- Max Abramson, state representative
- Keith Ammon, state representative
- Glenn Bailey, state representative
- Melissa Blasek, state representative for Merrimack
- Lex Berezhny, state representative
- Alan Bershtein, state representative
- Tim Comerford, former state representative
- Leah Cushman, state representative for Weare
- Dustin Dodge, state representative for Raymond
- Bob Elliott, state representative for Salem
- William Foster, state representative
- Ted Gorski, state representative for Bedford
- Juliet Harvey-Bolia, state representative
- James Horgan, state representative for Farmington
- Dawn Johnson, state representative for Laconia
- Diane Kelley, state representative
- Aboul Khan, state representative
- Erica Layon, state representative for Derry
- Alicia Lekas, state representative
- Tony Lekas, state representative
- John Lewicke, state representative
- David Love, state representative for Derry
- Mark McLean, state representative
- Hershel Nunez, state representative for Pelham
- Diane Pauer, state representative
- Lisa Post, state representative
- Andrew Prout, state representative for Pelham
- Matthew Santonastaso, state representative
- Matthew Simon, state representative
- Jonathan Smith, state representative
- Julius Soti, state representative for Windham
- Michael Sylvia, state representative for Belmont
- Mark Warden, state representative for Manchester
- Nick White, state representative
- Michael Yakubovich, state representative for Hooksett
- Josh Yokela, state representative
Gail Huff Brown

Executive branch officials

- John Bolton, United States National Security Advisor (2018–2019), United States Ambassador to the United Nations (2005–2006)
- K.T. McFarland, former Deputy National Security Advisor (2017)
- Linda McMahon, former Administrator of the Small Business Administration (2017–2019) and co-founder of WWE
- Robert C. O'Brien, former United States national security advisor (2019–2021)

U.S. representatives

- Newt Gingrich, former U.S. Representative from Georgia's 6th congressional district (1979–1999) and former Speaker of the United States House of Representatives (1995–1999)

Individuals

- Sean Hannity, Fox News talk show host and conservative political commentator

Organizations

- National Border Patrol Council

Newspapers

- New Hampshire Union Leader
Karoline Leavitt

U.S. senators

- Ted Cruz, U.S. Senator from Texas (2013–present)
- Mike Lee, U.S. Senator from Utah (2011–present)

Statewide officials

- Chris Sununu, Governor of New Hampshire (2017–2025) (post primary)

U.S. representatives

- Madison Cawthorn, U.S. Representative from North Carolina's 11th congressional district (2021–2023)
- Jim Jordan, U.S. Representative from Ohio's 4th congressional district (2007–present)
- Elise Stefanik, U.S. Representative from New York's 21st congressional district (2015–present)

State legislators

- Al Baldasaro, state representative for Londonderry
- Harry Bean, state representative
- Ralph Boehm, state representative for Litchfield
- Debra DeSimone, state representative
- Linda Gould, state representative for Bedford
- John Janigian, state representative for Salem
- Thomas Kaczynski Jr., state representative for Rochester
- James Kofalt, state representative
- David Lundgren, state representative for Londonderry
- Tom Ploszaj, state representative
- Ken Sheffert, former state representative
- James Spillane, state representative
- Paul Terry, state representative

Individuals

- Rico Petrocelli, former Boston Red Sox player
Matt Mowers

Federal officials

- Nikki Haley, former United States ambassador to the United Nations (2017–2018) and former governor of South Carolina (2011–2017)
- Mike Pompeo, former United States Secretary of State (2018–2021), former Director of the Central Intelligence Agency (2017–2018) and former U.S. Representative from Kansas's 4th congressional district (2011–2017)

U.S. representatives

- Ashley Hinson, U.S. Representative from Iowa's 1st congressional district (2021–present)
- Kevin McCarthy, Minority Leader (2019–2023), U.S. Representative from California's 23rd congressional district (2013–2023) and 22nd district (2007–2013)
- Steve Scalise, Minority Whip (2019–2023), U.S. Representative from Louisiana's 1st congressional district (2008–present)

Governors

- Craig Benson, former governor of New Hampshire (2003–2005)

State legislators

- Kimberly Rice, Speaker Pro Tempore of the New Hampshire House of Representatives

State senators

- Regina Birdsell, state senator from the 19th district
- Harold French, state senator from the 7th district
- Bill Gannon, state senator from the 23rd district
- John Reagan, state senator from the 17th district

Organizations

- Citizens United

Individuals

- David Bossie, president of Citizens United

==== Forums and debates ====
2022 New Hampshire's 1st congressional district republican primary candidate forum & debate
No.	Date	Host	Moderator	Link	Republican	Republican	Republican	Republican	Republican	Republican	Republican	Republican	Republican	Republican
Key: P Participant A Absent N Not invited I Invited W Withdrawn														
Key: P Participant A Absent N Not invited I Invited W Withdrawn					Tom Alciere	Tim Baxter	Gail Huff Brown	Mark Kilbane	Karoline Leavitt	Mary Maxwell	Matt Mowers	Russell Prescott	Kevin Rondeau	Gilead Towne
1	Aug. 4, 2022	New Hampshire Journal			N	P	P	N	P	N	P	P	N	N
2	Sep. 6, 2022	New Hampshire Institute of Politics; WMUR	Adam Sexton		N	P	P	N	P	N	P	P	N	N

==== Polling ====
Poll source	Date(s) administered	Sample size (Note: Key: A – all adults RV – registered voters LV – likely voters V – unclear)	Margin of error	Julian Acciard	Tom Alciere	Tim Baxter	Gail Huff Brown	Mark Kilbane	Karoline Leavitt	Matt Mowers	Russell Prescott	Gilead Towne	Other	Undecided
University of New Hampshire	August 25–29, 2022	419 (LV)	± 4.8%	–	–	4%	16%	–	24%	26%	4%	–	0%	26%
Remington Research Group (R) (Note: Poll sponsored by Leavitt's campaign)	August 14–17, 2022	462 (LV)	± 4.5%	–	1%	9%	9%	0%	21%	21%	3%	0%	0% (Note: Maxwell and Rondeau with 0%)	35%
co/efficient (R)	August 13–14, 2022	829 (LV)	± 3.4%	–	–	9%	8%	–	16%	31%	3%	–	–	33%
Saint Anselm College	August 9–11, 2022	423 (RV)	± 4.8%	–	–	8%	9%	–	21%	25%	2%	–	1%	33%
The Tarrance Group (R) (Note: Poll sponsored by the Congressional Leadership Fund)	August 1–4, 2022	302 (LV)	± 5.8%	–	–	10%	8%	1%	13%	37%	6%	–	3%	22%
Cygnal (R) (Note: Poll sponsored by Mowers's campaign)	October 24–25, 2021	350 (LV)	± 5.2%	1%	–	1%	7%	–	6%	34%	–	–	–	51%
Praecones Analytica (R)	August 13–20, 2021	792 (LV)	± 3.5%	3%	–	4%	–	–	7%	43%	–	2%	–	42%

==== Results ====
Republican primary results
Party	Candidate	Votes	%
Republican	Karoline Leavitt	25,931	34.6
Republican	Matt Mowers	19,072	25.4
Republican	Gail Huff Brown	12,999	17.3
Republican	Russell Prescott	7,551	10.1
Republican	Tim Baxter	6,970	9.3
Republican	Mary Maxwell	673	0.9
Republican	Kevin Rondeau	610	0.8
Republican	Gilead Towne	466	0.6
Republican	Mark Kilbane	347	0.5
Republican	Tom Alciere	342	0.5
Total votes		74,961	100.0

=== General election ===
==== Debate ====
2022 New Hampshire's 1st congressional district debate
No.	Date	Host	Moderator	Link	Democratic	Republican
Key: P Participant A Absent N Not invited I Invited W Withdrawn						
Key: P Participant A Absent N Not invited I Invited W Withdrawn					Chris Pappas	Karoline Leavitt
1	Nov. 3, 2022	New Hampshire Institute of Politics; WMUR	Adam Sexton		P	P

==== Predictions ====
Source	Ranking	As of
The Cook Political Report	Tossup	June 6, 2022
Inside Elections	Tilt D	June 7, 2022
Sabato's Crystal Ball	Lean D	September 14, 2022
Politico	Tossup	June 14, 2022
RCP	Lean R (flip)	October 21, 2022
Fox News	Lean D	November 1, 2022
DDHQ	Tossup	November 2, 2022
538	Lean D	November 1, 2022
The Economist	Tossup	November 2, 2022

==== Polling ====
Aggregate polls

Source of poll aggregation	Dates administered	Dates updated	Chris Pappas (D)	Karoline Leavitt (R)	Undecided (Note: Calculated by taking the difference of 100% and all other candidates combined.)	Margin
FiveThirtyEight	September 14 – November 6, 2022	November 6, 2022	48.1%	48.5%	3.4%	Leavitt +0.4

Graphical summary

Poll source	Date(s) administered	Sample size	Margin of error	Chris Pappas (D)	Karoline Leavitt (R)	Other	Undecided
University of New Hampshire	November 2–6, 2022	1,043 (LV)	± 3.0%	50%	49%	0%	1%
Saint Anselm College	October 28–29, 2022	791 (LV)	± 3.5%	45%	51%	–	4%
co/efficient (R)	October 25–26, 2022	525 (LV)	± 4.0%	48%	44%	–	8%
Fabrizio Ward (R)/Impact Research (D) (Note: Poll sponsored by AARP)	October 2–6, 2022	250 (LV)	± 4.4%	48%	47%	2%	3%
Saint Anselm College	September 27–28, 2022	450 (RV)	± 4.9%	49%	41%	3% (Note: "Someone else" with 3%)	7%
University of New Hampshire	September 15–19, 2022	423 (LV)	± 4.8%	50%	43%	1% (Note: "Other" with 1%)	6%
Emerson College	September 14–15, 2022	415 (LV)	± 3.4%	47%	42%	5% (Note: "Someone else" with 5%)	6%

Hypothetical polling

Generic Democrat vs. generic Republican

Poll source	Date(s) administered	Sample size	Margin of error	Generic Democrat	Generic Republican	Other	Undecided
Saint Anselm College	August 9–11, 2022	961 (RV)	± 4.8%	42%	48%	2%	9%
Saint Anselm College	March 23–24, 2022	663 (RV)	± 3.8%	41%	48%	3%	8%
Saint Anselm College	January 11–12, 2022	640 (RV)	± 3.9%	40%	48%	3%	9%
Saint Anselm College	October 20–22, 2021	692 (RV)	± 3.7%	41%	48%	4%	7%
Saint Anselm College	August 24–26, 2021	991 (RV)	± 3.1%	43%	47%	2%	7%
Saint Anselm College	March 4–6, 2021	439 (RV)	± 4.7%	48%	39%	3%	10%

Chris Pappas vs. generic opponent

Poll source	Date(s) administered	Sample size	Margin of error	Chris Pappas (D)	Generic Opponent	Undecided
Saint Anselm College	August 9–11, 2022	961 (RV)	± 4.8%	38%	47%	15%

==== Results ====
New Hampshire's 1st congressional district, 2022
Party	Candidate	Votes	%
Democratic	Chris Pappas (incumbent)	167,391	54.00
Republican	Karoline Leavitt	142,229	45.89
Write-in		342	0.11
Total votes		309,962	100.00
Democratic hold			

===== By county =====
County	Chris Pappas Democratic		Karoline Leavitt Republican		Write-in		Margin		Total
County	#	%	#	%	#	%	#	%	Total
Belknap	13,139	45.96%	15,429	53.97%	21	0.07%	-2,290	-8.01%	28,589
Carroll	12,500	49.89%	12,528	50.01%	25	0.10%	-28	-0.11%	25,053
Hillsborough	38,434	55.76%	30,403	44.11%	94	0.14%	8,031	11.65%	68,931
Merrimack	3,337	50.13%	3,319	49.86%	1	0.01%	18	0.27%	6,657
Rockingham	66,128	53.20%	58,055	46.70%	127	0.10%	8,073	6.49%	124,310
Strafford	33,853	60.00%	22,495	39.87%	74	0.13%	11,358	20.13%	56,422

== District 2 ==
2022 New Hampshire's 2nd congressional district election
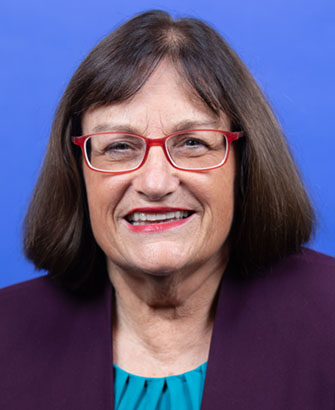

Nominee	Annie Kuster	Robert Burns
Party	Democratic	Republican
Popular vote	171,731	135,567
Percentage	55.8%	44.1%
- Municipality results Kuster: 50–60% 60–70% 70–80% 80–90% Burns: 50–60% 60–70% 70–80% Tie: 40–50% 50%
U.S. Representative before election
Annie Kuster
Democratic
Elected U.S. Representative
Annie Kuster
Democratic

The 2nd district encompasses western and northern New Hampshire, and includes the cities of Nashua and Concord. The incumbent was Democrat Annie Kuster, who was re-elected with 53.9% of the vote in 2020.

=== Democratic primary ===
==== Candidates ====
===== Nominee =====
- Annie Kuster, incumbent U.S. Representative

==== Endorsements ====
Annie Kuster

Organizations

- Council for a Livable World
- EMILY's List
- Feminist Majority PAC
- Giffords
- League of Conservation Voters
- NARAL Pro-Choice America
- Planned Parenthood Action Fund
- Population Connection Action Fund
- Sierra Club

==== Results ====
Democratic primary results
Party	Candidate	Votes	%
Democratic	Annie Kuster (incumbent)	48,630	100.0
Total votes		48,630	100.0

=== Republican primary ===
==== Candidates ====
===== Nominee =====
- Robert Burns, former Hillsborough County Treasurer

===== Eliminated in primary =====
- Scott Black, Whitefield resident
- Michael Callis
- George Hansel, Mayor of Keene
- Jay Mercer
- Dean Poirier, Gulf War era veteran
- Lily Tang Williams, former chair of the Colorado Libertarian Party and Libertarian nominee for U.S. Senate in Colorado in 2016

==== Endorsements ====
Robert Burns

Federal officials

- Christopher C. Miller, retired U.S. Army colonel, former acting United States Secretary of Defense

State representatives

- Al Baldasaro, state representative for Londonderry
- Fred Doucette, state representative for Salem
- Joshua Whitehouse, former state representative for Farmington
Jeffrey Cozzens (withdrawn)

State legislators

- Joseph DePalma, state representative
- Erin Hennessey, state senator from the 1st district
- Troy Merner, state representative
- Matthew Simon, state representative
George Hansel

Governors

- Chris Sununu, Governor of New Hampshire
Lily Tang Williams

Organizations

- Tea Party Express

==== Debate ====
2022 New Hampshire's 2nd congressional district republican primary debate
No.	Date	Host	Moderator	Link	Republican	Republican	Republican	Republican	Republican	Republican	Republican
Key: P Participant A Absent N Not invited I Invited W Withdrawn											
Key: P Participant A Absent N Not invited I Invited W Withdrawn					Scott Black	Robert Burns	Michael Callis	George Hansel	Jay Mercer	Dean Poirier	Lily Tang Williams
1	Sep. 7, 2022	New Hampshire; Institute of Politics; WMUR	Adam Sexton		N	P	N	P	N	N	P

==== Polling ====
Poll source	Date(s) administered	Sample size	Margin of error	Robert Burns	George Hansel	Lily Tang Williams	Other	Undecided
University of New Hampshire	August 25–29, 2022	469 (LV)	± 4.5%	32%	18%	10%	3%	37%
Saint Anselm College	August 9–11, 2022	397 (RV)	± 4.9%	12%	10%	8%	6%	65%

==== Results ====
Republican primary results
Party	Candidate	Votes	%
Republican	Robert Burns	21,065	33.3
Republican	George Hansel	19,024	30.1
Republican	Lily Tang Williams	15,729	24.9
Republican	Scott Black	2,211	3.5
Republican	Jay Mercer	2,085	3.3
Republican	Dean Poirier	2,047	3.2
Republican	Michael Callis	1,133	1.8
Total votes		63,294	100.0

=== General election ===
==== Debate ====
2022 New Hampshire's 2nd congressional district debate
No.	Date	Host	Moderator	Link	Democratic	Republican
Key: P Participant A Absent N Not invited I Invited W Withdrawn						
Key: P Participant A Absent N Not invited I Invited W Withdrawn					Annie Kuster	Robert Burns
1	Oct. 28, 2022	Todd Bookman; Ethan DeWitt	New Hampshire Bulletin; New Hampshire PBS; New Hampshire Public Radio		P	P

==== Predictions ====
Source	Ranking	As of
The Cook Political Report	Lean D	September 14, 2022
Inside Elections	Likely D	June 7, 2022
Sabato's Crystal Ball	Likely D	October 19, 2022
Politico	Lean D	October 3, 2022
RCP	Tossup	September 27, 2022
Fox News	Lean D	September 20, 2022
DDHQ	Likely D	November 2, 2022
538	Likely D	October 18, 2022
The Economist	Lean D	November 7, 2022

==== Polling ====
Aggregate polls

Source of poll aggregation	Dates administered	Dates updated	Annie Kuster (D)	Robert Burns (R)	Undecided (Note: Calculated by taking the difference of 100% and all other candidates combined.)	Margin
FiveThirtyEight	September 14 – November 6, 2022	November 6, 2022	49.9%	44.3%	5.8%	Kuster +5.5

Graphical summary

Poll source	Date(s) administered	Sample size	Margin of error	Annie Kuster (D)	Robert Burns (R)	Other	Undecided
University of New Hampshire	November 2–6, 2022	1,027 (LV)	± 3.1%	53%	45%	2%	1%
Saint Anselm College	October 28–29, 2022	750 (LV)	± 3.6%	50%	42%	–	8%
co/efficient (R)	October 25–26, 2022	573 (LV)	± 4.0%	43%	44%	–	13%
Fabrizio Ward (R)/Impact Research (D)	October 2–6, 2022	250 (LV)	± 4.4%	53%	43%	1%	3%
Saint Anselm College	September 27–28, 2022	451 (RV)	± 4.9%	49%	35%	9% (Note: "Someone else" with 9%)	7%
University of New Hampshire	September 15–19, 2022	445 (LV)	± 4.6%	48%	45%	–	7%
Emerson College	September 14–15, 2022	385 (LV)	± 3.4%	54%	36%	6% (Note: "Someone else" with 6%)	5%

Hypothetical polling

Generic Democrat vs. generic Republican

Poll source	Date(s) administered	Sample size	Margin of error	Generic Democrat	Generic Republican	Other	Undecided
Saint Anselm College	August 9–11, 2022	937 (RV)	± 4.9%	44%	44%	2%	10%
NRCC (R)	June 6–7, 2022	~319 (LV)	± 5.5%	43%	48%	–	9%
Saint Anselm College	March 23–24, 2022	602 (RV)	± 4.0%	43%	45%	1%	10%
Saint Anselm College	January 11–12, 2022	575 (RV)	± 4.1%	40%	44%	5%	11%
Saint Anselm College	October 20–22, 2021	631 (RV)	± 3.9%	45%	44%	3%	9%
Saint Anselm College	August 24–26, 2021	864 (RV)	± 3.3%	43%	45%	3%	9%
Saint Anselm College	March 4–6, 2021	432 (RV)	± 4.7%	48%	40%	4%	8%

Annie Kuster vs. generic opponent

Poll source	Date(s) administered	Sample size	Margin of error	Annie Kuster (D)	Generic Opponent	Undecided
Saint Anselm College	August 9–11, 2022	937 (RV)	± 4.9%	36%	51%	13%

==== Results ====
New Hampshire's 2nd congressional district, 2022
Party	Candidate	Votes	%
Democratic	Annie Kuster (incumbent)	171,636	55.80
Republican	Robert Burns	135,579	44.08
Write-in		369	0.12
Total votes		307,584	100.00
Democratic hold			

===== By county =====
County	Annie Kuster Democratic		Robert Burns Republican		Write-in		Margin		Total
County	#	%	#	%	#	%	#	%	Total
Belknap	939	47.64%	1,028	52.16%	4	0.20%	-89	-4.52%	1,971
Carroll	1,373	66.91%	679	33.09%	0	0.00%	696	33.92%	2,052
Cheshire	20,390	60.32%	13,358	39.52%	54	0.16%	7,032	20.80%	33,802
Coös	6,224	48.69%	6,541	51.17%	19	0.15%	-317	-2.48%	12,784
Grafton	27,047	63.56%	15,468	36.35%	39	0.09%	11,579	27.21%	42,554
Hillsborough	55,238	53.92%	47,099	45.98%	101	0.10%	8,139	7.95%	102,438
Merrimack	37,102	58.16%	26,584	41.67%	104	0.16%	10,518	16.49%	63,790
Rockingham	13,080	44.91%	16,016	54.99%	30	0.10%	-2,936	-10.08%	29,126
Sullivan	10,243	53.72%	8,806	46.18%	18	0.09%	1,437	7.54%	19,067

== Notes ==
Partisan clients
