= Tom Alciere =

American politician

Member of the New Hampshire House of Representatives from the Hillsborough 29th district
- In office December 6, 2000 – January 11, 2001 Serving with David E. Cote, Mary J. Gorman
- Preceded by: Alphonse A. Haettenschwiller
- Succeeded by: David J. Gleneck

Personal details
- Party: Republican (1996–2018, 2022–present); Libertarian (2018); Democratic (2020)

Tom Alciere is an American web designer, politician, and perennial political candidate. A member of the Republican Party, the Libertarian Party, and the Democratic Party, he served in the New Hampshire House of Representatives from December 2000 to January 2001.

== Life and career ==
Alciere is a self-employed webmaster.

In 2000, Alciere was elected to the New Hampshire House of Representatives along with David E. Cote and Mary J. Gorman in the general election for the Hillsborough 29th district. He defeated Democratic incumbent Alphonse A. Haettenschwiller by just 55 votes. Shortly after his election to the House, he received backlash for endorsing the murder of police officers in numerous online posts, including one that read "nobody will ever be safe until the last cop is dead." He resigned from the House on January 11, 2001, just over a month into his term.

A perennial candidate, Alciere has run for office over a dozen times since 1992, with his only victory being the aforementioned 2000 state house election.

== Electoral history ==
2024 New Hampshire's 2nd congressional district Republican primary results
| Party | Candidate | Votes | % |
|---|---|---|---|
| Republican | Lily Tang Williams | 22,040 | 35.9 |
| Republican | Vikram Mansharamani | 16,565 | 27.0 |
| Republican | Bill Hamlen | 9,860 | 16.1 |
| Republican | Paul Wagner | 2,329 | 3.8 |
| Republican | Casey Crane | 2,046 | 3.3 |
| Republican | Randall Clark | 1,866 | 3.0 |
| Republican | William Harvey | 1,743 | 2.8 |
| Republican | Jay Mercer | 1,573 | 2.6 |
| Republican | Jason Riddle | 869 | 1.4 |
| Republican | Robert D'Arcy | 714 | 1.2 |
| Republican | Michael Callis | 632 | 1.0 |
| Republican | Tom Alciere | 623 | 1.0 |
| Republican | Gerard Belloin | 552 | 0.9 |
| Total votes | | 61,412 | 100.0 |

2022 New Hampshire's 1st congressional district Republican primary results
| Party | Candidate | Votes | % |
|---|---|---|---|
| Republican | Karoline Leavitt | 25,931 | 34.6 |
| Republican | Matt Mowers | 19,072 | 25.4 |
| Republican | Gail Huff Brown | 12,999 | 17.3 |
| Republican | Russell Prescott | 7,551 | 10.1 |
| Republican | Tim Baxter | 6,970 | 9.3 |
| Republican | Mary Maxwell | 673 | 0.9 |
| Republican | Kevin Rondeau | 610 | 0.8 |
| Republican | Gilead Towne | 466 | 0.6 |
| Republican | Mark Kilbane | 347 | 0.5 |
| Republican | Tom Alciere | 342 | 0.5 |
| Total votes | | 74,961 | 100.0 |

2020 United States Senate election in New Hampshire Democratic primary results
| Party | Candidate | Votes | % |
|---|---|---|---|
| Democratic | Jeanne Shaheen (incumbent) | 142,012 | 93.88% |
| Democratic | Paul Krautman | 5,914 | 3.91% |
| Democratic | Tom Alciere | 2,992 | 1.98% |
| Republican | Don Bolduc (write-in) | 199 | 0.13% |
| Republican | Corky Messner (write-in) | 137 | 0.09% |
| Republican | Andy Martin (write-in) | 11 | 0.0% |
| Republican | Gerard Beloin (write-in) | 3 | 0.0% |
| Total votes | | 151,268 | 100.0% |

2018 New Hampshire's 2nd congressional district election Libertarian primary results
| Party | Candidate | Votes | % |
|---|---|---|---|
| Libertarian | Justin O'Donnell | 426 | 74.7 |
| Libertarian | Tom Alciere | 144 | 25.3 |
| Total votes | | 570 | 100.0 |

2016 United States Senate election in New Hampshire Republican primary results
| Party | Candidate | Votes | % |
|---|---|---|---|
| Republican | Kelly Ayotte (incumbent) | 86,676 | 78.56% |
| Republican | Jim Rubens | 19,156 | 17.36% |
| Republican | Tom Alciere | 1,586 | 1.44% |
| Republican | Gerald Beloin | 1,255 | 1.14% |
| Republican | Stanley Emanuel | 1,187 | 1.08% |
| Democratic | Maggie Hassan (write-in) | 301 | 0.27% |
| Write-in | | 167 | 0.15% |
| Total votes | | 110,328 | 100.0% |

2010 United States Senate election in New Hampshire Republican primary results
| Party | Candidate | Votes | % |
|---|---|---|---|
| Republican | Kelly Ayotte | 53,056 | 38.21% |
| Republican | Ovide Lamontagne | 51,397 | 37.01% |
| Republican | Bill Binnie | 19,508 | 14.05% |
| Republican | Jim Bender | 12,611 | 9.08% |
| Republican | Dennis Lamare | 1,388 | 1.00% |
| Republican | Tom Alciere | 499 | 0.36% |
| Republican | Gerard Beloin | 402 | 0.29% |
| Total votes | | 138,861 | 100.00% |

2008 United States Senate election in New Hampshire Republican primary results
| Party | Candidate | Votes | % |
|---|---|---|---|
| Republican | John Sununu (incumbent) | 60,852 | 88.7% |
| Republican | Tom Alciere | 7,084 | 10.3% |
| Write-in | | 685 | 1.0% |
| Total votes | | 68,621 | 100.0% |

2006 New Hampshire State Senate District 13 Republican Primary
| Party | Candidate | Votes | % | ±% |
|---|---|---|---|---|
| Republican | Dennis C. Hogan | 830 | 80.98% | N/A |
| Republican | Tom Alciere | 133 | 12.98% | N/A |
| Republican | Joseph A. Foster | 4 | 0.39% | N/A |
| Write in | Scattering | 58 | 5.66% | N/A |

2004 U.S. Senate Republican Primary
| Party | Candidate | Votes | % | ±% |
|---|---|---|---|---|
| Republican | Judd A. Gregg | 60,597 | 91.59% | N/A |
| Republican | Tom Alciere | 2,682 | 4.05% | N/A |
| Republican | Michael Tipa | 2,563 | 3.87% | N/A |
| Republican | Doris "Granny D" Haddock | 143 | 0.22% | N/A |
| Write in | Scattering | 179 | 0.27% | N/A |

2000 State Representative Hillsborough 29 District General Election
| Party | Candidate | Votes | % | ±% |
|---|---|---|---|---|
| Democratic | David E. Cote | 1,333 | 33.96% | N/A |
| Democratic | Mary J. Goreman | 1,034 | 26.34% | N/A |
| Republican | Tom Alciere | 806 | 20.53% | N/A |
| Democratic | Alphonse A. Haettenschwiller | 751 | 19.13% | N/A |
