= David J. Gleneck =

American politician

Member of the New Hampshire House of Representatives from the Hillsborough 29th district
- In office April 18, 2001 – December 4, 2002
- Preceded by: Tom Alciere

Personal details
- Born: November 7, 1933
- Died: October 18, 2018 (aged 84)
- Party: Republican

David J. Gleneck (November 7, 1933 – October 18, 2018) was an American politician. A member of the Republican Party, he served in the New Hampshire House of Representatives from 2001 to 2002.

== Life and career ==
Gleneck was a member of the Nashua Taxpayers Association.

In March 2001, Gleneck defeated Elizabeth Van Twuyver in the special Republican primary election for the Hillsborough 29th district of the New Hampshire House of Representatives. In April 2001, he defeated Alphonse A. Haettenschwiller in the special general election, winning 51 percent of the vote.

Gleneck died on October 18, 2018, at the age of 84.
