= Lily Tang Williams =

American perennial candidate (born 1964)

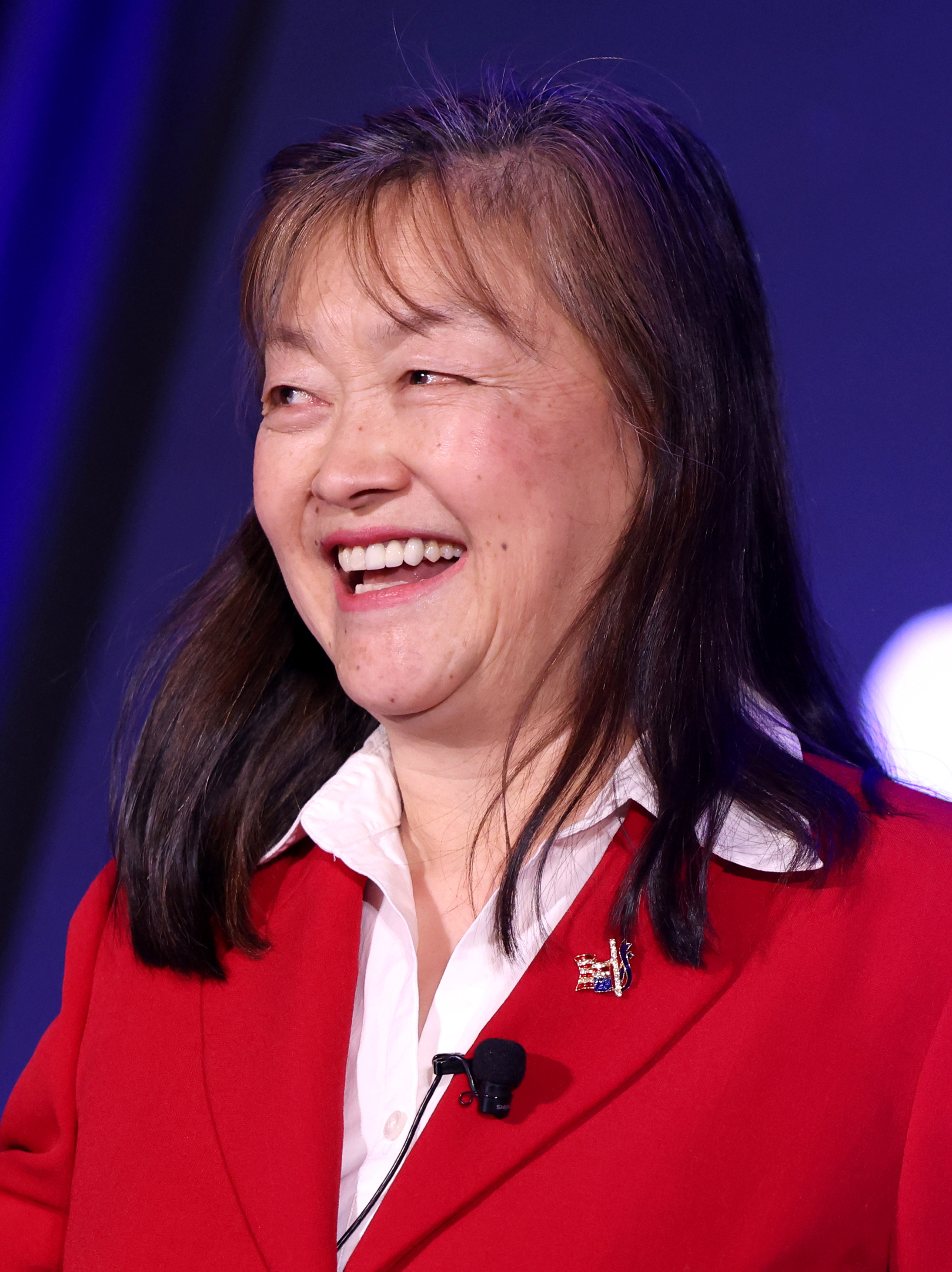
- Tang Williams in 2025

Chair of the Colorado Libertarian Party
- In office April 26, 2015 – January 11, 2016
- Preceded by: Jeff Orrok
- Succeeded by: Nathan Grabau

Personal details
- Born: Táng Bǎihé; July 30, 1964 (age 62) Chengdu, Sichuan, China
- Citizenship: United States; China (until 1994)
- Party: Republican (1995–2008, 2019–present); Libertarian (2008–2019)
- Spouse: John Williams (m. 1990)
- Children: 3
- Education: Fudan University (LLB); University of Texas, Austin (MSW)

Chinese name
- Chinese: 唐百合
Transcriptions
Standard Mandarin
- Hanyu Pinyin: Táng Bǎihé

Lily Tang Williams (born July 30, 1964) is an American politician, businesswoman, and perennial candidate who chaired the Colorado Libertarian Party from 2015 to 2016. She unsuccessfully ran for the U.S. House of Representatives in New Hampshire's 2nd congressional district as a Republican in 2022 and 2024, losing the Republican primary in 2022 and losing the general election as the Republican nominee to Maggie Goodlander in 2024. She was also the Libertarian nominee for the U.S. Senate in Colorado in 2016 and unsuccessfully ran for the Colorado House of Representatives as a Libertarian in 2014. She is again running for the U.S. House of Representatives in New Hampshire's 2nd congressional district in 2026.

== Early life and education ==
Tang was born on July 30, 1964, in Chengdu, the capital of Sichuan province in southwestern China. Born to illiterate working-class parents, she grew up under the rule of Mao Zedong and her early childhood coincided with the Cultural Revolution, which lasted until Mao's death in 1976. She grew up in poverty but excelled in school, graduating at the top of her high school class and placing near the top of China's national exams.

After high school, Tang studied law at Fudan University in Shanghai. While in college, she met a foreign exchange student from the United States who showed her a pocket version of the United States Constitution and the Declaration of Independence, sparking her interest in emigrating to the United States. She received a bachelor's degree in 1985 and subsequently joined the law school faculty at Fudan University and practiced corporate law while China began rebuilding its economy. She came to the United States in 1988 to study at the University of Texas at Austin, and was subsequently granted asylum. In 1991, she earned a Master of Science in Social Work from the University of Texas at Austin. She became a naturalized U.S. citizen in 1994.

== Business career ==
Williams was a research assistant at the University of Texas at Austin and got a minimum-wage job at a telemarketing company to improve her English skills. After finishing graduate school, she became a social worker in Laramie, Wyoming, working with troubled youth as well as seniors in Wyoming home health care business. In the late 1990s, she moved to Hong Kong with her family as an expatriate to work as a corporate executive for PREL, Inc., helping to manage Walmart's operations in China. In 1999, she moved to Parker, Colorado, to work for a telecommunications company. When the company went bankrupt in 2000, Williams started a consulting firm to help American companies conduct business in China and provide expert witness services on China-related matters. In 2009 she and her husband launched a rental property investment and management company that operates in New Hampshire, Nevada, Florida, and Colorado. She is also a public speaker for the Victims of Communism Memorial Foundation. She travels around the United States to give speeches about her experiences growing up in communist China.

== Political career ==
=== Colorado politics ===
Upon becoming a U.S. citizen in 1995, Williams registered as a Republican after being drawn to the party's positions on limited government. However, she became disillusioned with the party due to surveillance provisions in the Patriot Act and the passage of the Emergency Economic Stabilization Act and ultimately left the Republican Party to become a Libertarian in 2008.

Williams served on the board of her neighborhood's homeowner association from 2000 to 2002 and chaired the board of her children's charter school in Douglas County from 2005 to 2008. She first became involved in politics during an internship for Colorado State Representative Brad Young in 2002. She was motivated to become a political activist following the election of Barack Obama. Initially speaking out against Common Core and gun control laws, she testified against new state-level gun control laws at the Colorado State Capitol in 2013.

Williams was a regional coordinator for former New Mexico Governor Gary Johnson's 2012 presidential campaign and supported Johnson's candidacy in 2016 after he won the Libertarian nomination. Williams and her husband were both national delegates to the Libertarian National Convention in 2012 and 2016. She first ran for office in 2014 as the Libertarian candidate for the Colorado House of Representatives in House District 44, winning 6.4% of the vote.

On April 26, 2015, Williams was elected chair of the Colorado Libertarian Party. She announced on January 12, 2016, that she would run for the United States Senate as a Libertarian.

==== 2016 U.S. Senate campaign ====
On January 12, 2016, after resigning as chair of the Colorado Libertarian Party, Williams announced her candidacy for the United States Senate in the 2016 election to unseat incumbent Democratic U.S. Senator Michael Bennet. She participated in a general election debate against Bennet and Republican nominee Darryl Glenn, becoming the first third-party candidate in recent memory to participate in such a debate in Colorado. She won 3.6% of the vote in the general election, underperforming Johnson, who won 5.2% of the vote in Colorado on the same ballot, but improving on the 2.6% Gaylon Kent won as a Libertarian in 2014.

=== New Hampshire politics ===
Williams, previously elected as Supervisor of Checklists in her town of Weare, New Hampshire is a co-founder and chair of the New Hampshire Asian American Coalition and sits on the advisory board of U.S. Parents Involved in Education. As a supporter of parental rights, Williams argues that parents have the right to refuse mask mandates and compulsory vaccines. During the COVID-19 pandemic, she founded a women's social group in Weare, New Hampshire, to connect local women during quarantine. She endorsed Donald Trump in the 2024 presidential election and has expressed questions about the results of the 2020 presidential election.

==== 2022 congressional campaign ====
Williams ran for the U.S. House of Representatives in New Hampshire's 2nd congressional district in the 2022 elections to unseat incumbent Democratic U.S. Representative Annie Kuster. She faced former Hillsborough County Treasurer Bob Burns and Keene Mayor George Hansel in the Republican primary. She was endorsed by the Tea Party Express, a national Tea Party-aligned political action committee that supports conservative candidates for state and federal office, including in New Hampshire. She placed third in the primary, winning 24.9% of the vote and losing to Burns, who went on to be defeated by Kuster in the general election.

==== 2024 congressional campaign ====
After the 2022 midterms, Williams announced she would run again for the U.S. House of Representatives in New Hampshire's 2nd congressional district in 2024 to replace Kuster, who is retiring instead of seeking reelection. She faced Lincoln businessman Vikram Mansharamani and Hanover businessman Bill Hamlen in the Republican primary and defeated them and 10 other candidates with 35.8% of the vote. As the Republican nominee in this district, Williams lost to Democratic nominee Maggie Goodlander, a former Biden White House advisor, in the general election 52.9%-47.0%.

==== 2026 congressional campaign ====
On April 9, 2025, Williams posted on X announcing her run again for the U.S. House of Representatives in New Hampshire's 2nd congressional district in 2026, potentially setting up a rematch against Representative Maggie Goodlander, who defeated her in 2024.

==== Involvement with the Free State Project ====
In 2016, Williams visited New Hampshire for the first time and signed the Free State Project pledge to move to New Hampshire and "advance liberty." In 2019, after re-registering as a Republican, she and her husband moved to Weare, New Hampshire. Though she is not an active member of the Free State Project, she spoke at the organization's Porcupine Freedom Festival as a congressional candidate in 2024.

== Personal life ==
Williams (Táng Bǎihé) met her husband, John Williams, on the day she arrived in the United States in 1988. They married in 1990 and have three children together. They live in Weare, New Hampshire.
