= Progressive caucus =

The term progressive caucus is used to describe American left-leaning caucuses within either the Democratic Party or the Democratic caucus in various legislatures:

== Nationwide ==
- Congressional Progressive Caucus

== State-wide Level ==
- Arizona Progressive Democrats
- California Legislative Progressive Caucus
- Colorado Progressives
- Democratic Progressive Caucus of Florida
- Idaho Progressive Caucus
- Illinois Progressive Caucus
- Kansas Progressive Caucus
- Kentucky Progressive Democratic Caucus
- Louisiana Progressive Caucus
- Maine Progressives
- Michigan - The Justice Caucus
- Progressive Caucus of the Minnesota Democratic–Farmer–Labor Party
- Missouri Progressives
- New Hampshire House Progressive Caucus
- North Carolina Progressives
- Ohio Progressive Democratic Caucus
- Rhode Island Progressive Caucus
- South Carolina Progressive Caucus
- Texas Progressive Caucus
- Utah Progressives
- General Assembly Progressive Caucus - Virginia, formed in 2011
- Washington State Progressive Caucus
- Progressive Democrats of Wisconsin

== Local Level ==
- New York City Council Progressive Caucus
- Chicago City Council Progressive Reform Caucus

== Outside the USA ==
This term has also adopted outside the United States. The following is an example:

- Progressive Caucus (South Africa)
