= Alphonse A. Haettenschwiller =

American military officer and politician (1925–2025)

Member of the New Hampshire House of Representatives from the Hillsborough 28th district
- In office 1990–1992

Member of the New Hampshire House of Representatives from the Hillsborough 29th district
- In office 1992–2000
- Succeeded by: Tom Alciere

Personal details
- Born: Alphonse Alexander Haettenschwiller; October 7, 1925 Englewood, New Jersey, U.S.
- Died: February 6, 2025 (aged 99) Nashua, New Hampshire, U.S.
- Party: Democratic
- Education: Syracuse University; Columbia University School of Public Health
- Occupation: Military officer

Alphonse Alexander Haettenschwiller (October 7, 1925 – February 6, 2025) was an American military officer and politician. A member of the Democratic Party, he served in the New Hampshire House of Representatives from 1992 to 2000.

== Life and career ==
Haettenschwiller was born in Englewood, New Jersey, the son of Alphonse Haettenschwiller Sr. and Patricia Grace. He served in the United States Army during World War II, which after his discharge, he attended Syracuse University, earning his BA degree in 1950. After earning his degree, he served as an officer in the United States Army Reserve in Germany, and was chief of the environmental sciences division at the army's Environmental Hygiene Agency. During his military service, he attended Columbia University School of Public Health, earning his MPA degree in 1958. He retired from his military service in 1973, retiring at the rank of lieutenant colonel.

Haettenschwiller served in the New Hampshire House of Representatives from 1990 to 2000.

== Death ==
Haettenschwiller died on February 6, 2025, in Nashua, New Hampshire, at the age of 99.
