= Casey Crane =

American politician/Media Personality

Member of the New Hampshire House of Representatives from the Hillsborough 21st district
- In office December 4, 2002 – January 3, 2009

Personal details
- Born: October 14, 1965 (age 60)
- Party: Republican

Elenore "Casey" Crane is an American politician and media personality. She served in the state of New Hampshire. A member of the Republican Party, she represented Hillsborough District 21 in the New Hampshire House of Representatives from 2002 to 2009. Crane was a former White House news producer for INN (Independent Network News) and WPIX-TV 11. In 1989, Crane left DC to host the "Joe and Casey" show on WCAP 980 in Lowell, MA. Upon Joe's departure, she became the first woman to host the morning show on WCAP.

== Political career ==
Crane was elected to the New Hampshire House in 2002. She was re-elected in 2004 and 2006.

Crane has filed to run for New Hampshire's 2nd congressional district in the 2024 election.

== Personal life ==
Crane lives in Nashua. She has one son.
