= Stefany Shaheen =

American politician (born 1974)

- Shaheen in 2015

Member-elect of the U.S. House of Representatives from New Hampshire's 1st district
- Assuming office January 3, 2027
- Succeeding: Chris Pappas

Personal details
- Born: September 1, 1974 (age 52) Portsmouth, New Hampshire, U.S.
- Party: Democratic
- Spouse: Craig Welch
- Children: 4
- Parent: Jeanne Shaheen (mother)
- Education: Fairfield University (BA); Harvard University (MPA); Massachusetts Institute of Technology (MBA)

Stefany A. Shaheen (born September 1, 1974) is an American politician from New Hampshire. A member of the Democratic Party, she is the member-elect to the United States House of Representatives for New Hampshire's 1st congressional district.

== Early life and career ==
Shaheen was born in Portsmouth, New Hampshire, in 1974. She attended Oyster River High School in Durham, New Hampshire. She earned a scholarship to play volleyball at Fairfield University. She became the head coach of the volleyball team at Portsmouth High School in 2017. She stepped down at the conclusion of her two-year agreement.

== Political career ==
In 2014, Shaheen was elected to the Portsmouth City Council. She considered running for governor in the 2016 election, but opted not to.

In 2023, President Joe Biden appointed Shaheen to the President's Council on Sports, Fitness, and Nutrition.

In May 2025, Shaheen announced her candidacy for the United States House of Representatives in New Hampshire's 1st congressional district in the 2026 elections. She won the Democratic Party primary election on September 8, 2026, and won the general election on November 3.

== Personal life ==
Shaheen is the daughter of William and Jeanne Shaheen. She and her husband have four children. Shaheen wrote a book, Elle & Coach, about the bond between her daughter, who has type 1 diabetes, and her service dog, which was published in 2015. She served on the board of the Joslin Diabetes Center in Boston.

== Bibliography ==
- Shaheen, Stefany; Dagostino, Mark (2015). Elle & Coach: Diabetes, the Fight for My Daughter's Life, and the Dog Who Changed Everything. Hachette Books. ISBN 978-0316258753.

U.S. House of Representatives
Preceded by Chris Pappas	Member of the U.S. House of Representatives from New Hampshire's 1st congressional district Taking office 2027	Elect
