= Karoline Leavitt =

American political spokesperson (born 1997)

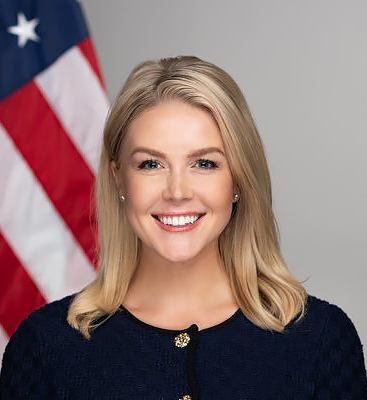
- Official portrait, 2025

36th White House Press Secretary
- In office January 20, 2025 – August 27, 2026
- President: Donald Trump
- Deputy: Harrison Fields; Anna Kelly
- Preceded by: Karine Jean-Pierre
- Succeeded by: Katie Zacharia

Personal details
- Born: Karoline Claire Leavitt; August 24, 1997 (age 29) Atkinson, New Hampshire, U.S.
- Party: Republican
- Spouse: Nicholas Riccio (m. 2025)
- Children: 2
- Education: Saint Anselm College (BA)
- Leavitt's voice Leavitt on the Laken Riley Act. Recorded January 31, 2025

Karoline Claire Leavitt (/lɛvɪt/, LEV-it; born August 24, 1997) is an American political spokesperson who served as the 36th White House press secretary from 2025 to 2026. A member of the Republican Party, she was the party's nominee in the 2022 election for New Hampshire's 1st congressional district.

Leavitt studied politics and communication at Saint Anselm College, graduating in 2019. She interned in the White House Office of Presidential Correspondence and later became its associate director. In June 2020, Leavitt became an assistant White House press secretary. After Donald Trump's loss in the 2020 presidential election, she became a communications director for New York congresswoman Elise Stefanik.

In July 2021, Leavitt announced her campaign for the United States House of Representatives election for New Hampshire's first congressional district. She established herself as a pro-Trump candidate. Leavitt won the Republican primary, but lost to Democratic incumbent Chris Pappas. She served as a spokeswoman for MAGA Inc., Trump's super PAC, and became the press secretary for his 2024 presidential campaign.

In November 2024, President-elect Trump named Leavitt as his White House press secretary. She is the youngest person to hold the position in U.S. history, as well as the first member of Generation Z in the position. In August 2026, Trump announced that Leavitt would resign as the White House press secretary.

== Early life ==
Karoline Claire Leavitt was born on August 24, 1997, in Atkinson, New Hampshire. She was the third and youngest child of Bob and Erin Leavitt. Her family owned an ice cream stand in Atkinson and her father owned a used truck dealership in Plaistow. Leavitt attended Central Catholic High School, a private Catholic school in Lawrence, Massachusetts. She played softball and was named an Eagle-Tribune All-Star in 2014 and 2015. In interviews, she has credited her Catholic education as formative for her spirituality and instilling her with certain mores, including faith, family, discipline, the importance of public service, and an anti-abortion stance.

Leavitt began attending Saint Anselm College in Goffstown, New Hampshire, in 2015, where she received a scholarship to play softball and majored in communications and minored in political science. She interned with NBC Sports Boston but later shifted toward political journalism. Leavitt became involved with the New Hampshire Institute of Politics in her sophomore year; as the institute's ambassador, she interned for a United States senator and the television station WMUR. By the end of her sophomore year, she had given up softball. Leavitt applied for an internship at Fox News, but later interned as a writer for the White House Office of Presidential Correspondence writing letters and notes on behalf of the president. Leavitt founded Saint Anselm's broadcasting club and wrote for its paper, the Saint Anselm Crier. She later described herself as the "token conservative" on campus, and her writings reflected a conservative viewpoint. In a 2016 opinion piece for the Crier, she wrote that the media was "frankly crooked" and "unjust, unfair, and sometimes just plain old false". For one semester, Leavitt studied at John Cabot University in Rome. She graduated in 2019, becoming the first person in her immediate family to graduate from college.

== Career ==
=== White House assistant press secretary (2019–2021) ===
After graduating, Leavitt was offered a full-time job in the White House Office of Presidential Correspondence responding to letters sent to president Donald Trump; by June 2020, she was its associate director. That month, she was named as an assistant White House press secretary after a friend who was a personal aide to the president referred her to the press secretary, Kayleigh McEnany. She attended an event in the White House Rose Garden that later served as the beginning of the White House COVID-19 outbreak; Leavitt later tested positive for the virus. In January 2021, weeks before Trump left office, she became the communications director for New York representative Elise Stefanik.

=== U.S. congressional campaign in New Hampshire (2021–2022) ===
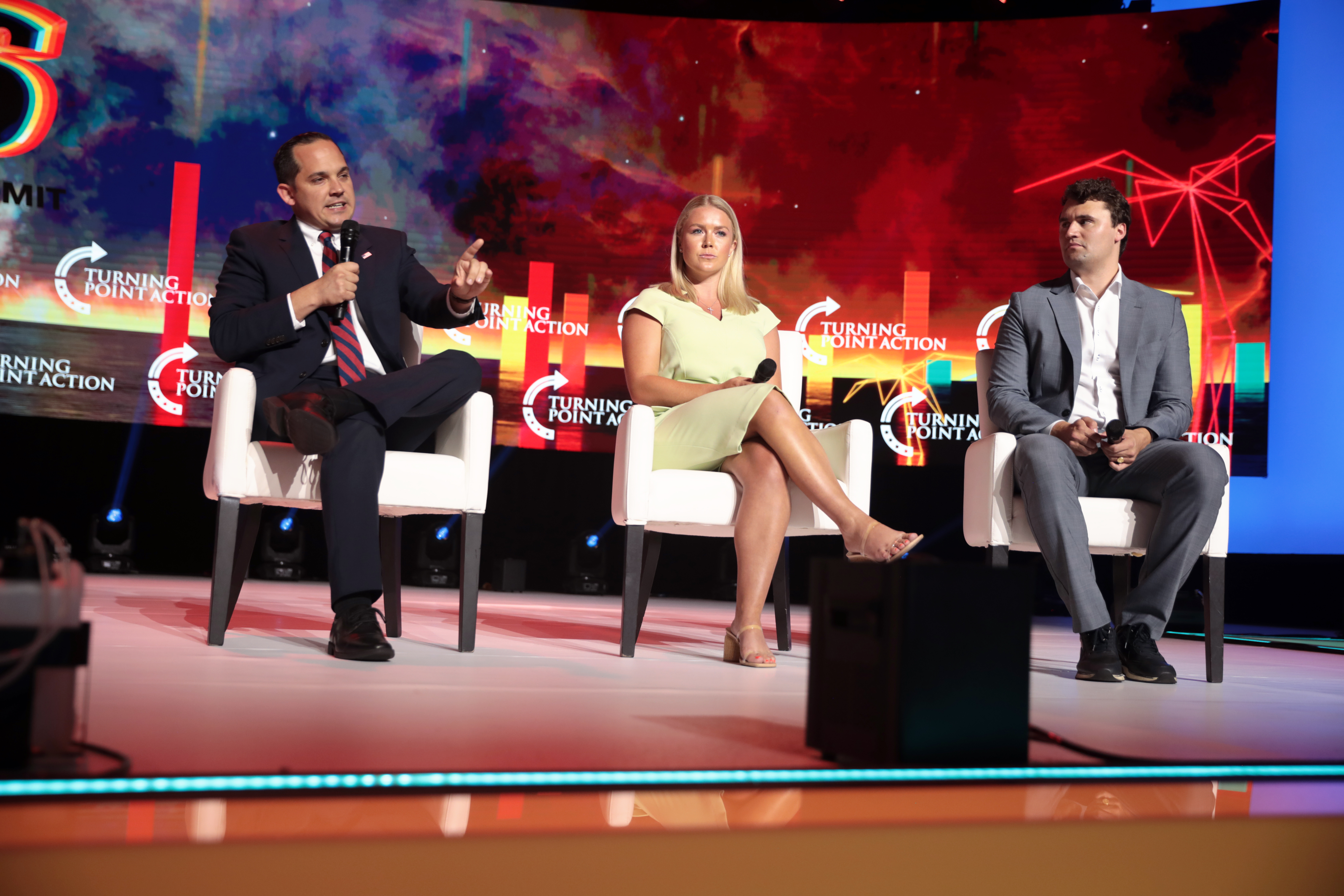
Leavitt (center) at the 2022 Student Action Summit in Tampa, Florida

On July 19, 2021, Leavitt announced her intention to run in the United States House of Representatives election for New Hampshire's first congressional district as a Republican in an interview with WMUR. She said she was encouraged to run after President Joe Biden reversed many of the policies enacted by his predecessor, Donald Trump, and after Twitter erroneously suspended her account while she was working for Stefanik. Within three days, her campaign had raised $100,000. Leavitt's campaign largely leveraged her experience within the Trump administration, as she sought to be viewed as the most pro-Trump candidate in the Republican primary. She officially filed to run in June 2022. Polling in August placed Leavitt second behind Matt Mowers, who had been the Republican nominee in the 2020 House of Representatives election.

Leading up to the primary, Leavitt criticized Mowers as insufficiently pro-Trump, including noting that he was a former advisor to former New Jersey governor Chris Christie. The dichotomy in Leavitt's firebrand approach and Mowers's tempered strategy demonstrated a divide in the Republican Party, according to The New York Times; Leavitt received endorsements from Texas senator Ted Cruz and representatives Lauren Boebert, Jim Jordan, and Stefanik, in a demonstration of support from Republican lawmakers. She concluded her campaign with a gun shoot at a fish and game club. Leavitt won the Republican primary in September. At 25, she was the second member of Generation Z to win a House primary and the first Republican to do so, after Democrat Maxwell Frost won his Florida primary the previous month. She was defeated by Democratic incumbent Chris Pappas.

In 2022, Leavitt faced a Federal Election Commission complaint from End Citizens United alleging that her campaign and treasurer had illegally accepted campaign donations over the legal limit and had never repaid her donors. In January 2025, Leavitt disclosed in 17 amended campaign filings $326,370 in unpaid campaign debts she had failed to disclose for several years. Roughly $200,000 of the debt had been composed of illicit campaign donations made in excess of campaign finance limits she had never paid back, in violation of campaign finance laws.

=== Post-election work (2023–2025) ===
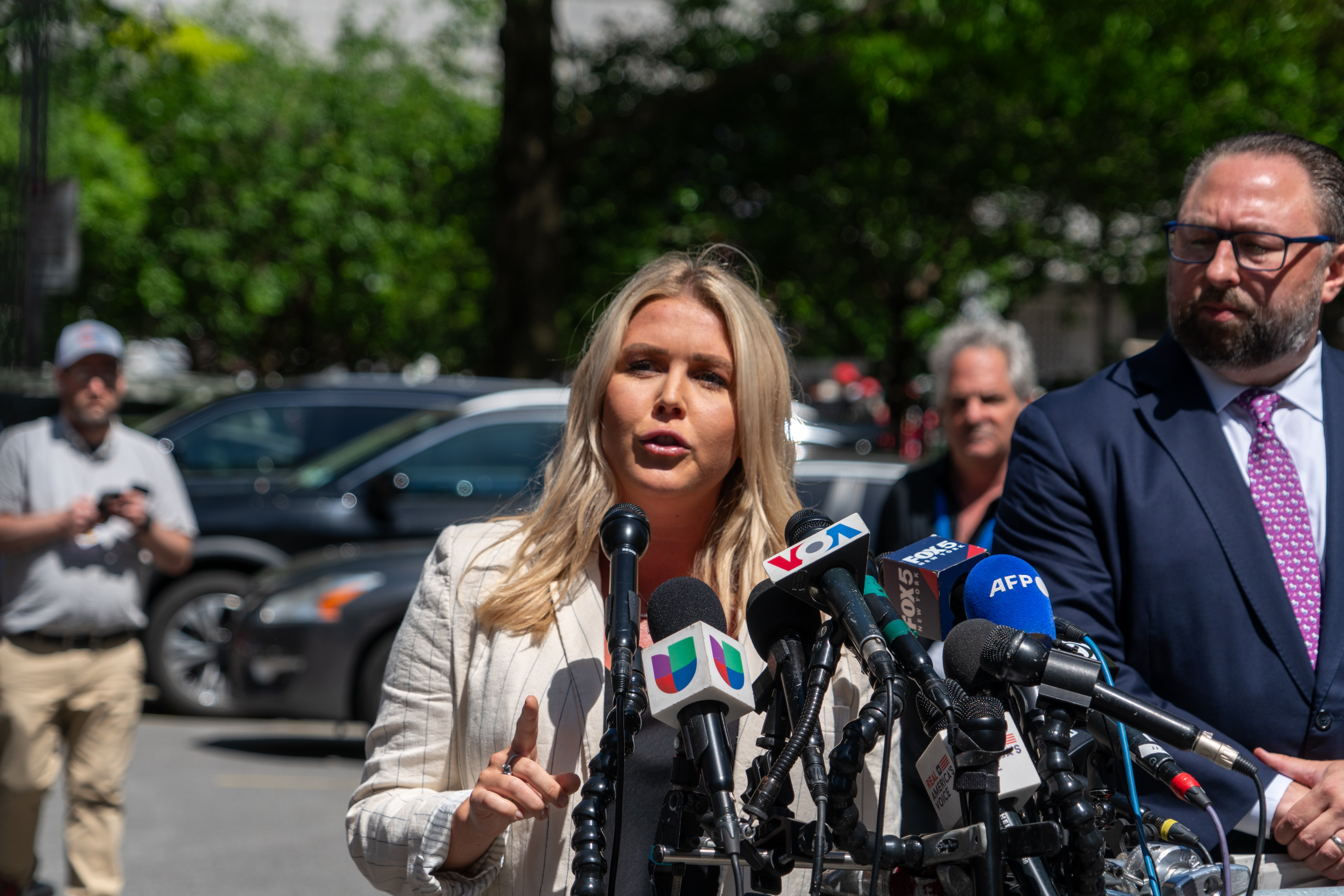
Leavitt addressing the press during the criminal trial of Donald Trump in New York

After losing to Pappas, Leavitt began working for MAGA Inc., Trump's super PAC. She was featured in a video produced for Project 2025, a political initiative to prepare for a Republican presidency, training political appointees on how to counter the federal bureaucracy. Leavitt began working for Trump's 2024 presidential campaign in January 2024 as his national press secretary.

== White House Press Secretary (2025–2026) ==
Leavitt's first press briefing on January 28, 2025

On November 15, 2024, president-elect Trump named Leavitt as his White House press secretary. She is the youngest White House press secretary in history. She was given a smaller office in the West Wing in comparison to her predecessors, with the office reserved for press secretaries instead being occupied by Taylor Budowich, the deputy chief of staff for communications and personnel. Leavitt gave her first press conference on January 28, 2025, beginning the briefing by seeking to elevate non-traditional media. During the press conference, she falsely said that $50 million in taxpayer dollars had been intended for use in funding condoms in the Gaza Strip. Reporters indicated that the erroneous claim appears to originate from the government initiative DOGE misinterpreting a grant to prevent the spread of HIV in Gaza Province, Mozambique.

Her tenure was marked by a separation from precedent, particularly with non-traditional media. In February, Leavitt announced that the White House would select who participated in the presidential press pool. That month, she said that "new voices are going to be welcomed" alongside traditional media. The following month, Axios reported that the White House sought to change the seating chart for reporters, potentially by appointing Leavitt as president of the White House Correspondents' Association. Leavitt was named as a defendant in Associated Press v. Budowich (2025), a lawsuit that began after Trump's staff moved to block the Associated Press from certain press events over the Gulf of Mexico–America naming dispute. According to the lawsuit, Leavitt told Zeke Miller, the chief White House correspondent for the Associated Press, that the organization would be barred from certain areas of the White House unless it referred to the Gulf of Mexico as the "Gulf of America".

In her tenure as press secretary, White House briefings began to reflect Trump's conflict with the news media. According to an analysis by The New York Times in April 2025, Leavitt called on individuals standing on the perimeters of the James S. Brady Press Briefing Room—a collection of reporters from The Gateway Pundit, Real America's Voice, One America News Network, The Daily Signal, LindellTV, The Daily Wire, and Turning Point USA—approximately a quarter of the time. Leavitt additionally added a "new media" seat in January, calling on its occupants first in every briefing; the journalists sitting in the seat were primarily from right-wing media outlets and online news publications.

== Post-government work (2026–present) ==
In August 2026, Trump announced that Leavitt would leave her position at the end of that month to spend more time with her family. Trump wrote that Leavitt would serve as one of his "outside advisors". She accepted a role in MAGA Inc in August. In October 2026, Fox News announced that Leavitt would join the network as a contributor beginning November 1, providing commentary across its programs.

== Communications style ==
Leavitt has employed a combative communications style. During a press briefing, a journalist for The Hill challenged the defense of ICE agents made by Leavitt and Kristi Noem. When Leavitt asked the reporter why he thought Renée Good was killed, he answered "because an ICE agent acted recklessly and killed her unjustifiably", after which Leavitt called the reporter "biased" and a "left-wing hack". Ari Fleischer, a former press secretary for president George W. Bush, cited her approach mirroring Trump's style as the reason for her continued tenure, in contrast to the abrupt removals of Trump's previous press secretaries. Kayleigh McEnany, who mentored Leavitt, told USA Today that her approach was to bring "evidence-based accountability".

== Political positions ==
Leavitt's campaign for New Hampshire's first congressional district focused on lowering taxes and lessening regulations to support small businesses, challenging critical race theory in public schools and educational "indoctrination", supporting school choice, increasing ID requirements on voting, and funding police. She also supported Trump's immigration policies and opposed vaccine mandates. Leavitt is a proponent of repealing Section 230 of the Communications Decency Act of 1996, which provides service providers immunity from liability for third-party content generated by users.

Leavitt has said that she believed Trump was the legitimate winner of the 2020 presidential election and that "irregularities and chaos" occurred as a result of precautions against the COVID-19 pandemic, but that Joe Biden was certified in the Electoral College vote count. In March 2025, The Washington Post reported she privately believed Trump lost; Leavitt said she did not recall those conversations. Leavitt denounced the January 6 Capitol attack, but said she did not believe that Trump incited it. Tweets that she posted after the attack praised Vice President Mike Pence, who refused to certify the fake electors provided by Trump, and Eugene Goodman, a Capitol Police officer who led rioters away from the Senate chamber. Both tweets were later deleted.

== Personal life ==
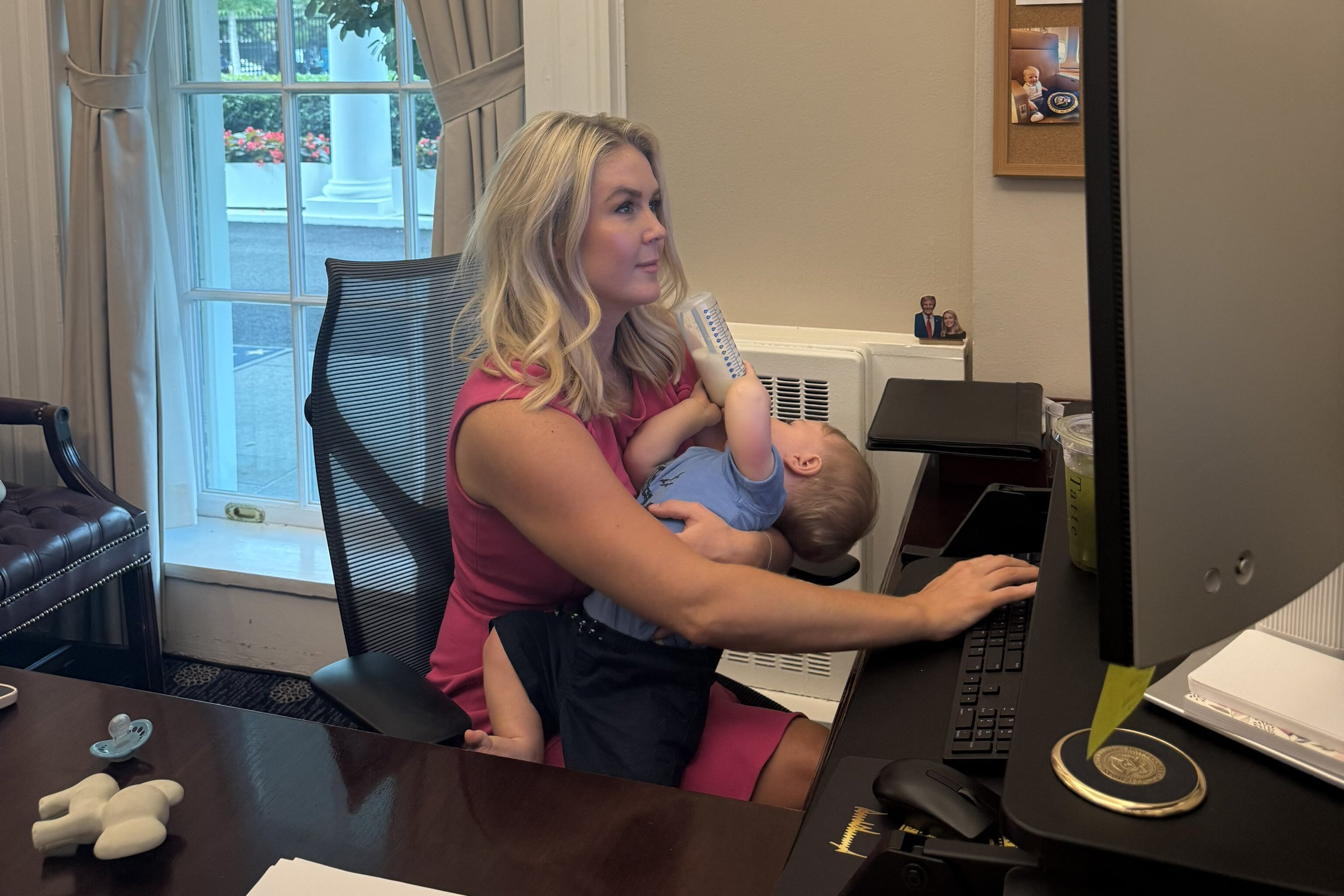
Leavitt holding her son while typing in May 2025

Leavitt is a practicing Roman Catholic.

In December 2023, Leavitt became engaged to Nicholas Riccio, a real estate developer from New Hampshire who is 32 years her senior. They were introduced in 2022 at a restaurant during Leavitt's congressional campaign. Leavitt has described Riccio as "an introvert" and her "opposite". Their son was born in July 2024. She returned to work within a week of his birth, on the day of Thomas Crooks's attempted assassination of Trump. Leavitt married Riccio in January 2025, days before Trump's second inauguration. A photograph of Leavitt feeding her son with a bottle while working drew attention on social media in May 2025. In December 2025, Leavitt announced that she was pregnant with a second child, making her the first White House press secretary to be pregnant while serving. Her daughter was born in May 2026.

In November 2025, the mother of one of Leavitt's nephews was detained by United States Immigration and Customs Enforcement and removal proceedings began.

== Electoral history ==
2022 United States House of Representatives election for New Hampshire's first congressional district
Primary election
Party	Candidate	Votes	%
Republican	Karoline Leavitt	25,931	34.4
Republican	Matt Mowers	19,072	25.4
Republican	Gail Huff Brown	12,999	17.2
Republican	Russell Prescott	7,551	10.0
Republican	Tim Baxter	6,970	9.2
Republican	Mary Maxwell	673	0.9
Republican	Kevin Rondeau	610	0.8
Republican	Gilead Towne	466	0.6
Republican	Mark Kilbane	347	0.5
Republican	Tom Alciere	342	0.5
Write-in		259	0.3
Republican	Chris Pappas	181	0.2
Total votes		75,401	100.0
General election
Democratic	Chris Pappas	167,391	54.0
Republican	Karoline Leavitt	142,229	45.9
Write-in		342	0.1
Total votes		309,962	100.0

Political offices
Preceded by Karine Jean-Pierre	White House Press Secretary; 2025–2026	Succeeded by Katie Zacharia
