= Paul Terry (politician) =

American politician

Member of the New Hampshire House of Representatives from the Belknap 7th district
- Incumbent
- Assumed office December 7, 2022

Member of the New Hampshire House of Representatives from the Belknap 5th district
- In office December 2, 2020 – December 7, 2022

Personal details
- Party: Republican
- Website: Official website

Paul Terry is an American politician. He serves as a Republican member for the Belknap 7th district of the New Hampshire House of Representatives.

== Political career ==
Terry was an early supporter and sponsor of the New Hampshire Parental Bill of Rights. HB 10 (2025) was signed into law by Governor Kelly Ayotte on June 10, 2025.
