= George Hansel =

American politician

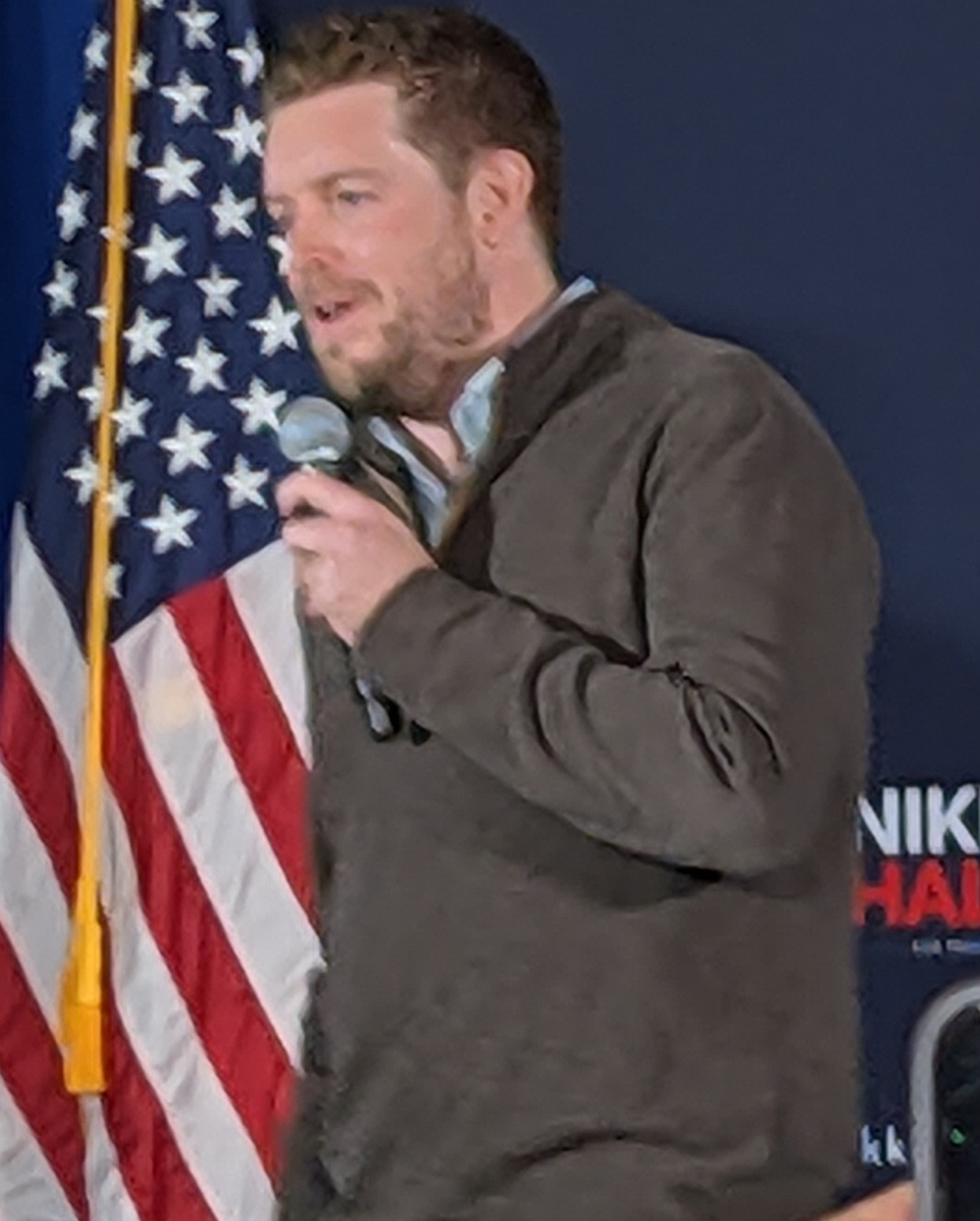
- Hansel at a Nikki Haley event in Keene, New Hampshire on January 20, 2024

Mayor of Keene
- In office January 1, 2020 – January 4, 2024
- Preceded by: Kendall Lane
- Succeeded by: Jay Kahn

Member of the Keene City Council from the 5th ward
- In office January 2016 – January 2020
- Succeeded by: Thomas Powers

Personal details
- Born: George Sumner Hansel; January 19, 1986 (age 40)
- Party: Republican
- Education: St. Lawrence University (BA)

George S. Hansel (born January 19, 1986) is an American politician who served as the Mayor of Keene from 2020 to 2024.

== Early life ==
Hansel's family moved to the Monadnock Region in 1971. He received his Bachelor of Arts degree from St. Lawrence University in Canton, New York. Prior to his elective career, Hansel was a co-owner and vice president for his family's fifth-generation Keene-based business Filtrine Manufacturing Co., a filtration and water cooling company.

== Early elected career ==
In 2014, Hansel won the Republican primary as a candidate for Cheshire 8 of the New Hampshire House of Representatives, but lost in the general election to incumbent Democrat Cynthia Chase by 51 votes. In December 2015, he was elected as a member of the Keene City Council from ward 5, serving two terms until being elected Mayor. George also serves on several statewide boards and commissions, including The University System Board of Trustees, the New Hampshire Council for Housing Stability, the New Hampshire Businesses for Social Responsibility, the Monadnock Center for Violence Prevention, and the Governor’s Millennial Advisory Council,

== Mayoralty ==
Hansel was first elected as mayor in 2019 by a margin of 52.7% to 47.3%. He beat out Democrat Mitchell Greenwald for Keene’s open mayoral seat after incumbent mayor Kendall Lane chose not to run for reelection. Mayor Lane and former Keene Mayor Dale Pregent both endorsed Hansel in the race. Hansel took 2,586 votes to Greenwald’s 2,312, In 2021, Hansel secured a second term as mayor after easily defeating challenger Mark J. Zuchowsk. He won 2,133 votes compared to Zuchowski’s 212, or 91% to 9% of the vote. Each of the city’s five city council wards overwhelmingly supported Hansel, who ran for another two-year term on a platform focused on addressing the region’s housing shortage and continuing the city’s efforts to upgrade its aging infrastructure.

In October 2020, after Keene's city council passed a resolution recognizing Indigenous Peoples Day, Hansel proclaimed the second Monday of October Indigenous Peoples Day in Keene.

As mayor, Hansel has supported engaging more citizens in the local government aiming to "increase diversity on city boards and commissions."

On May 1, 2023 Hansel announced that he would not run for a third term as mayor.

Hansel endorsed Nikki Haley in the 2024 Republican presidential primary.

== Congressional run ==
In June 2022, Hansel announced his candidacy for U.S. Congress from New Hampshire's 2nd congressional district, running as a pro-choice moderate. In the primary, he was narrowly defeated by conservative Hillsborough County Treasurer Robert Burns, who lost the general election.

== Radio show ==
Hansel hosts a 2-hour radio show on Saturday mornings on Keene radio station WKBK. He also makes appearances on the station's weekday morning show.

== Criticism ==
Hansel has been criticized by Robert Burns, fellow candidate for Congress from New Hampshire's 2nd congressional district, for running a "sanctuary city" as mayor of Keene. This refers to a resolution passed by Keene's city council that declared Keene as a welcoming city for all. The resolution was aspirational and did not impact police policy. Mayor Hansel, a City Councilor at the time, voted against the passing the resolution. Nevertheless, Hansel said he didn't disagree with the resolution's sentiment. Hansel has dismissed Burns' criticism, referring to it as a "distraction".
