= Tim Baxter =

American politician

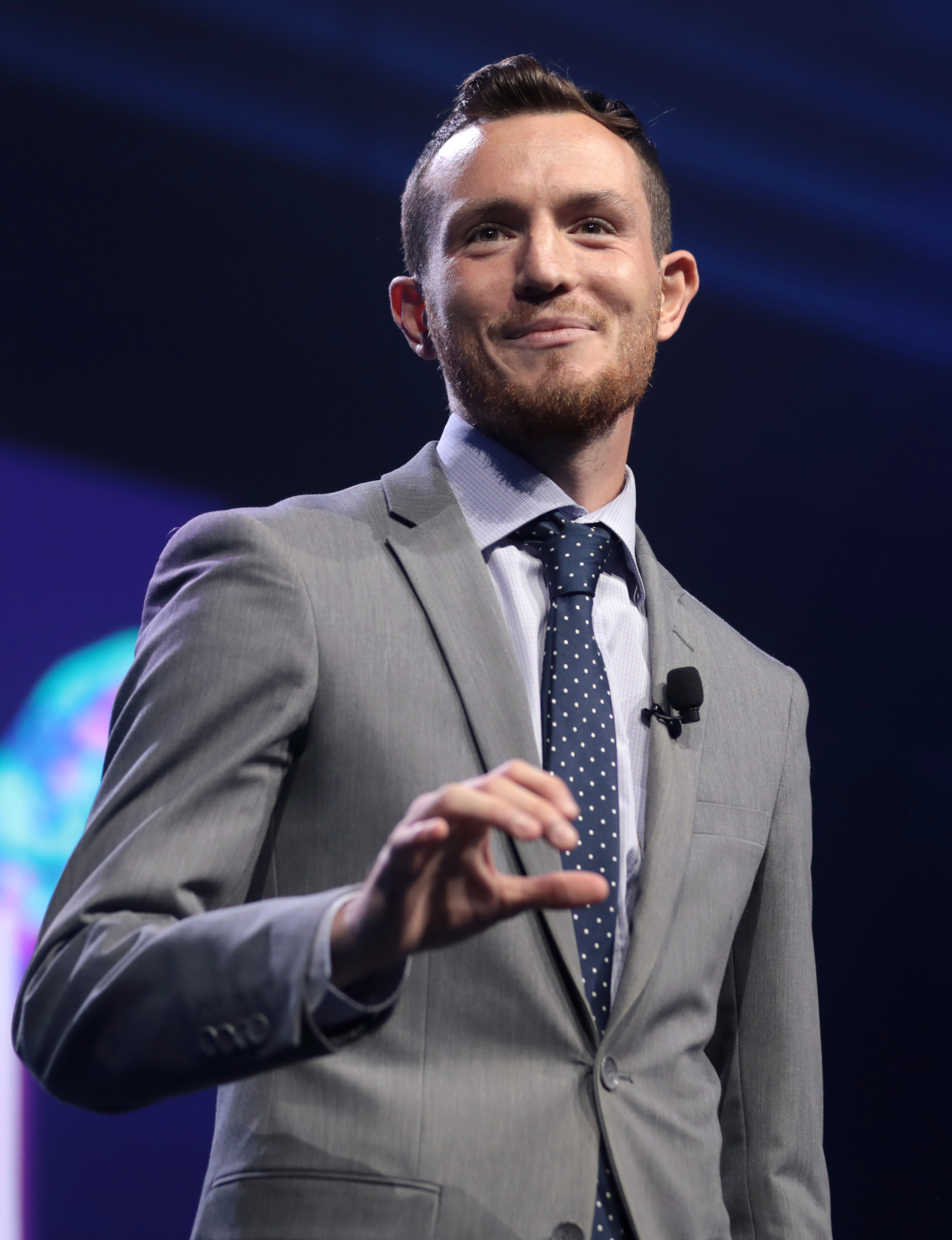
- Baxter in 2022

Member of the New Hampshire House of Representatives from the Rockingham 20th district
- In office December 2, 2020 – December 7, 2022
- Preceded by: Multi-member district
- Succeeded by: Seat abolished

Personal details
- Born: 1997 (age 28–29)
- Party: Republican
- Education: George Washington University (BA)

Tim Baxter (born 1997) is an American politician who served as a member of the New Hampshire House of Representatives from the Rockingham 20 district. Elected in November 2020, he assumed office on December 2, 2020.

== Early life and education ==
Baxter was raised in the Seacoast Region, splitting his time between Hampton and Seabrook, New Hampshire. He graduated from the Peddie School in New Jersey in 2016. He earned a Bachelor of Arts degree in history from George Washington University in 2020.

== Career ==
Prior to entering politics, Baxter founded Second Chances, a non-profit organization, that helps New Hampshire residents struggling with drug addiction into rehabilitation programs. He also buys, renovates, and rents residential properties in New Hampshire. He was elected to the New Hampshire House of Representatives in November 2020 and assumed office on December 2, 2020. Baxter is a member of the House Ways and Means Committee.

=== 2022 congressional election ===
In July 2021, Baxter announced his candidacy for New Hampshire's 1st congressional district in the 2022 election. He called for audits of the 2020 United States presidential election in New Hampshire. Baxter has received endorsements from Kentucky Congressman Thomas Massie, Kentucky Senator Rand Paul, and 40 members of the New Hampshire House of Representatives.

He lost the Republican primary on September 13, garnering 9% of the vote and placing 5th out of 10 candidates on the ballot.

== Personal life ==
Baxter is openly gay.
