= 2026 United States Senate election in New Hampshire =

U.S. Senate race in New Hampshire

- November 3, 2026

Nominee	Chris Pappas	John E. Sununu
Party	Democratic	Republican
Popular vote	356,425	268,712
Percentage	55.93%	42.17%
- Pappas: 40–50% 50–60% 60–70% 70–80% 80–90% Sununu: 40–50% 50–60% 60–70% 70–80% 80–90% Tie: 50% No votes
U.S. senator before election
Jeanne Shaheen
Democratic
Elected U.S. senator
Chris Pappas
Democratic

The 2026 United States Senate election in New Hampshire were held on November 3, 2026 to elect a member of the United States Senate to represent the state of New Hampshire. Democratic representative Chris Pappas defeated Republican former senator John Sununu. Democratic incumbent Jeanne Shaheen did not seek a fourth term.

Primary elections were held on September 8. Pappas won the Democratic nomination with 65% of the vote against medical scientist Karishma Manzur. Sununu, who held the seat for one term until he was defeated by Shaheen in 2008, won the Republican primary nomination with 68.5% of the vote against former Massachusetts senator Scott Brown.

Pappas is the first openly gay man elected to the Senate.

== Background ==
New Hampshire is considered a slightly to moderately blue state at the federal level, with Kamala Harris carrying the state by roughly 3 percentage points in the 2024 presidential election. The state's congressional delegation has been entirely Democratic since 2017. However, Republicans control the governorship, both state legislative chambers, and a majority in the executive council.

Shaheen was first elected in 2008, defeating incumbent John Sununu in a rematch of 2002, and was reelected in 2014 and 2020. Republicans have not won a U.S. Senate race in New Hampshire since 2010.

== Democratic primary ==
=== Candidates ===
==== Nominee ====
- Chris Pappas, U.S. representative for New Hampshire's 1st congressional district (2019–present)

==== Eliminated in primary ====
- David Jarvis, information technology consultant
- Karishma Manzur, medical scientist and member of the New Hampshire Democratic Party Rules Committee
- Maxwell L. Saal, medical researcher
- John Vail, candidate for president in 2024

==== Withdrawn ====
- Jared Sullivan, state representative from the Grafton 2nd district (2022–present)

==== Declined ====
- Maggie Goodlander, U.S. representative for New Hampshire's 2nd congressional district (2025–present) (running for re-election, endorsed Pappas)
- Annie Kuster, former U.S. representative for New Hampshire's 2nd congressional district (2013–2025) (endorsed Pappas)
- Jeanne Shaheen, incumbent U.S. senator (2009–present) (endorsed Pappas)
- Andru Volinsky, former executive councilor (2017–2021) and candidate for governor in 2020

=== Endorsements ===
Karishma Manzur

U.S. representatives

- Jamaal Bowman, former NY-16 (2021–2025)

State legislators

- Suraj Budathoki, state representative from the Hillsborough 40th district (2024–present)
- Tony Caplan, state representative from the Merrimack 8th district (2020–present)

Organizations

- 350NH
- Peace Action
- Progressive Democrats of America
- Progressive Victory
- Third Act
- Track AIPAC
Chris Pappas

Executive branch officials

- Pete Buttigieg, former secretary of transportation (2021–2025)
- Kamala Harris, former vice president of the United States (2021–2025)
- Maura Sullivan, former assistant to the secretary of defense for public affairs (2015) and candidate for NH-01 in 2026

U.S. senators

- Maggie Hassan, New Hampshire (2017–present)
- Mark Kelly, Arizona (2020–present)
- Amy Klobuchar, Minnesota (2007–present)
- Jeanne Shaheen, New Hampshire (2009–present)
- Elizabeth Warren, Massachusetts (2013–present)

U.S. representatives

- Gabby Giffords, former AZ-08 (2007–2012)
- Maggie Goodlander, NH-02 (2025–present)
- Annie Kuster, former NH-02 (2013–2025)

Statewide officials

- John Lynch, former governor of New Hampshire (2005–2013)

State legislators

- Evan Low, former California state assemblymember from the 26th district (2014–2024)
- Jared Sullivan, state representative from the Grafton 2nd district (2022–present) and former candidate for this seat

Individuals

- Susan Lynch, former first lady of New Hampshire (2005–2013)

Labor unions

- American Federation of Government Employees
- American Federation of Teachers–New Hampshire
- International Brotherhood of Teamsters Local 633
- International Union of Painters and Allied Trades District Council 35
- New Hampshire AFL-CIO
- New Hampshire Building and Construction Trades Council
- SEIU Local 1984

Organizations

- AIPAC
- Brady Campaign
- Council for a Livable World
- Democratic Majority for Israel
- End Citizens United
- Equality PAC
- Giffords
- Human Rights Campaign
- Jewish Democratic Council of America
- Joint Action Committee for Political Affairs
- League of Conservation Voters Action Fund
- LGBTQ+ Victory Fund
- National Committee to Preserve Social Security and Medicare
- Natural Resources Defense Council
- Planned Parenthood Action Fund
- Population Connection
- Reproductive Freedom for All

=== Fundraising ===
Campaign finance reports as of June 30, 2026
Candidate	Raised	Spent	Cash on hand
Karishma Manzur (D)	$206,753	$157,755	$48,998
Chris Pappas (D)	$13,371,607	$8,595,871	$5,183,321
Source: Federal Election Commission

=== Polling ===
Aggregate polls

Source of poll aggregation	Dates administered	Dates updated	Karishma Manzur	Chris Pappas	Undecided (Note: Calculated by taking the difference of 100% and all other candidates combined.)	Margin
270toWin	August 20–26, 2026	September 3, 2026	31.0%	53.0%	16.0%	Pappas +22.0%
RealClearPolitics	June 18–25, 2026	August 17, 2026	24.5%	57.5%	18.0%	Pappas +33.0%
Average			27.8%	55.7%	16.5%	Pappas +27.9%

Poll source	Date(s) administered	Sample size (Note: Key: A – all adults RV – registered voters LV – likely voters V – unclear)	Margin of error	Karishma Manzur	Chris Pappas	Jared Sullivan	Other	Undecided
GQR (D) (Note: Poll sponsored by Pappas' campaign)	August 19–25, 2026	422 (LV)	—	15%	71%	—	—	14%
University of New Hampshire	August 20–24, 2026	893 (LV)	± 3.3%	34%	47%	—	—	18%
Saint Anselm College	August 17–18, 2026	733 (LV)	± 3.6%	28%	59%	—	—	13%
Saint Anselm College	June 24–25, 2026	810 (RV)	± 3.4%	20%	62%	—	—	18%
University of New Hampshire	June 18–23, 2026	997 (LV)	± 3.1%	29%	53%	—	2%	16%
University of New Hampshire	April 17–21, 2026	481 (LV)	± 4.5%	18%	61%	1%	1% (Note: "Another candidate" with 1%)	18%
Saint Anselm College	March 16–18, 2026	691 (RV)	± 3.7%	9%	71%	3%	—	18%
University of New Hampshire	January 15–19, 2026	893 (LV)	± 3.3%	11%	65%	2%	—	22%
Saint Anselm College	November 18–19, 2025	1,015 (RV)	± 3.1%	8%	64%	2%	—	26%
University of New Hampshire	November 13–17, 2025	521 (LV)	± 4.3%	8%	57%	5%	—	30%
University of New Hampshire	September 17–23, 2025	508 (LV)	± 4.3%	14%	65%	—	1% (Note: "Write in someone else" with 1%)	20%

=== Results ===
Democratic primary results
Party	Candidate	Votes	%
Democratic	Chris Pappas	100,088	65.0
Democratic	Karishma Manzur	50,321	32.7
Democratic	David Jarvis	1,212	0.8
Democratic	John Vail	956	0.6
Democratic	Maxwell L. Saal	932	0.6
Write-in		355	0.2
Total votes		153,864	100.0

== Republican primary ==
=== Candidates ===
==== Nominee ====
- John Sununu, former U.S. senator from this seat (2003–2009)

==== Eliminated in primary ====
- Tom Alciere, former state representative (2000–2001) and perennial candidate
- Scott Brown, former ambassador to New Zealand and Samoa (2017–2020), former U.S. senator from Massachusetts (2010–2013), and nominee for this seat in 2014
- Sky Danley, president of the Fitz John Porter Project, Inc.
- Andy Martin, perennial candidate
- Mary Maxwell, perennial candidate
- Richard A. McMenamon II, auto repair shop owner
- Sabrina Ann Smith, member of the Pittsfield budget committee

==== Withdrawn ====
- Dan Innis, state senator (2016–2018, 2022–present) and candidate for New Hampshire's 1st congressional district in 2014 (running for re-election, endorsed Sununu)

==== Declined ====
- Kelly Ayotte, governor of New Hampshire (2025–present) and former U.S. senator (2011–2017) (running for re-election)
- Chris Sununu, former governor of New Hampshire (2017–2025) and brother of former U.S. Senator John E. Sununu
- Lily Tang Williams, former chair of the Colorado Libertarian Party, nominee for New Hampshire's 2nd congressional district in 2024 and candidate in 2022, and Libertarian nominee for U.S. Senate in Colorado in 2016 (running for U.S. House)

=== Endorsements ===
Scott Brown

Executive branch officials

- Mike Pompeo, former secretary of state (2018–2021)

U.S. senators

- Bob Smith, former New Hampshire (1990–2003)

Individuals

- Don Bolduc, retired U.S. Army brigadier general, nominee for senate in 2022, and candidate for this seat in 2020

Labor unions

- New England Police Benevolent Association

Organizations

- Animal Wellness Action
John E. Sununu

Executive branch officials

- Donald Trump, president of the United States (2017–2021, 2025–present)

U.S. senators

- Jim Banks, Indiana (2025–present)
- John Barrasso, Senate majority whip (2025–present) from Wyoming (2007–present)
- Marsha Blackburn, Tennessee (2019–present)
- Katie Britt, Alabama (2023–present)
- Shelley Moore Capito, West Virginia (2015–present)
- Bill Cassidy, Louisiana (2015–present)
- Susan Collins, Maine (1997–present)
- John Cornyn, Texas (2002–present)
- Tom Cotton, Arkansas (2015–present)
- Kevin Cramer, North Dakota (2019–present)
- Joni Ernst, Iowa (2015–present)
- Lindsey Graham, former South Carolina (2003–2026) (deceased)
- Judd Gregg, former New Hampshire (1993–2011)
- Bill Hagerty, Tennessee (2021–present)
- Jon Husted, Ohio (2025–present)
- Cindy Hyde-Smith, Mississippi (2018–present)
- Ron Johnson, Wisconsin (2011–present)
- John Kennedy, Louisiana (2017–present)
- James Lankford, Oklahoma (2015–present)
- Jerry Moran, Kansas (2011–present)
- Bernie Moreno, Ohio (2025–present)
- Lisa Murkowski, Alaska (2002–present)
- Pete Ricketts, Nebraska (2023–present)
- Mike Rounds, South Dakota (2015–present)
- Eric Schmitt, Missouri (2023–present)
- Tim Scott, South Carolina (2013–present)
- Tim Sheehy, Montana (2025–present)
- Tommy Tuberville, Alabama (2021–present)
- Roger Wicker, Mississippi (2007–present)
- Todd Young, Indiana (2017–present)

Statewide officials

- Craig Benson, former governor of New Hampshire (2003–2005)
- Joseph Kenney, New Hampshire executive councilor from the 1st district (2014–2019, 2021–present)
- John Stephen, New Hampshire executive councilor from the 4th district (2025–present)
- Janet Stevens, New Hampshire executive councilor from the 3rd district (2021–present)

State legislators

- Joe Alexander Jr., state representative from the Hillsborough 29th district (2022–present)
- Sharon Carson, president of the New Hampshire Senate (2024–present) from the 14th district (2008–present)
- Sam Farrington, state representative from the Strafford 8th district (2024–present)
- Dan Innis, state senator from the 7th district (2016–2018, 2022–present)
- Jason Osborne, state representative from the Rockingham 2nd district (2014–present)
- Joe Sweeney, state representative from the Rockingham 25th district (2012–present)
- Peter Varney, state representative from the Belknap 5th district (2014–present)

Party officials

- Stephen Stepanek, former chair of the New Hampshire Republican Party (2019–2023)

Labor unions

- SEIU Local 1984

Organizations

- Americans for Prosperity
- Log Cabin Republicans
- National Republican Senatorial Committee
- Senate Leadership Fund
- Turning Point Action

=== Fundraising ===
Italics indicate a withdrawn candidate.

Campaign finance reports as of June 30, 2026
Candidate	Raised	Spent	Cash on hand
Scott Brown (R)	$1,943,325	$1,207,514	$735,811
John E. Sununu (R)	$3,662,252	$989,605	$2,672,646
Source: Federal Election Commission

=== Polling ===
Aggregate polls

Source of poll aggregation	Dates administered	Dates updated	Scott Brown	John E. Sununu	Other/Undecided	Margin
270toWin	August 20–26, 2026	September 3, 2026	22.0%	57.0%	21.0%	Sununu +35.0%
Decision Desk HQ	through August 24, 2026	September 3, 2026	22.1%	56.5%	21.4%	Sununu +34.4%
RealClearPolitics	March 21 – August 24, 2026	September 3, 2026	21.0%	54.0%	25.0%	Sununu +33.0%
Average			21.7%	55.8%	22.5%	Sununu +34.1%

Poll source	Date(s) administered	Sample size	Margin of error	Scott Brown	Dan Innis	John E. Sununu	Other	Undecided
University of New Hampshire	August 20–24, 2026	856 (LV)	± 3.3%	20%	—	60%	2% (Note: Mary Maxwell and "write in someone else" with 1%)	17%
Saint Anselm College	August 17–18, 2026	678 (LV)	± 3.7%	24%	—	54%	—	23%
Saint Anselm College	June 24–25, 2026	739 (RV)	± 3.6%	21%	—	59%	—	20%
University of New Hampshire	June 18–23, 2026	978 (LV)	± 3.1%	20%	—	59%	1%	20%
NHJournal/Praecones Analytica	April 22 – May 13, 2026	350 (RV)	± 5.2%	27%	—	73%	—	
University of New Hampshire	April 17–21, 2026	562 (LV)	± 4.1%	19%	—	56%	4% (Note: Charlie Hough and "Write in another candidate" with 2%)	21%
Emerson College	March 21–23, 2026	524 (LV)	± 4.2%	19%	—	48%	1% (Note: Charlie Hough with 1%; Tejasinha Sivalingam with 0%)	32%
Saint Anselm College	March 16–18, 2026	673 (RV)	± 3.8%	28%	—	49%	—	23%
University of New Hampshire	January 15–19, 2026	967 (LV)	± 3.2%	25%	—	48%	1%	26%
Guidant Polling and Strategy (R) (Note: Poll sponsored by One Nation, a group aligned with the Senate Leadership Fund)	December 9–11, 2025	353 (LV)	—	30%	—	49%	—	21%
Saint Anselm College	November 18–19, 2025	1,000 (RV)	± 3.1%	30%	—	39%	—	31%
University of New Hampshire	November 13–17, 2025	593 (LV)	± 4.0%	27%	—	40%	1%	31%
	September 25, 2025	Innis withdraws from the race						
University of New Hampshire	September 17–23, 2025	555 (LV)	± 4.2%	19%	7%	42%	4% (Note: "Someone else" with 4%)	28%
co/efficient (R)	September 10–12, 2025	346 (LV)	—	23%	8%	40%	5% (Note: "Someone else" with 5%)	24%
Saint Anselm College	August 26–27, 2025	791 (RV)	± 3.5%	48%	13%	—	—	39%

=== Results ===
Republican primary results
Party	Candidate	Votes	%
Republican	John E. Sununu	75,839	68.4
Republican	Scott Brown	29,517	26.6
Republican	Sky Danley	1,187	1.1
Republican	Sabrina Ann Smith	955	0.9
Republican	Andy Martin	789	0.7
Republican	Mary Maxwell	774	0.7
Republican	Tom Alciere	602	0.5
Republican	Richard A. McMenamon II	403	0.4
Write-in		856	0.8
Total votes		110,922	100.0

== Third-party and independent candidates ==
=== Candidates ===
==== Declared ====
- Edmond LaPlante (Constitution), member of the Monadnock Regional School Board and chairman of the Constitution Party of New Hampshire

==== Did not qualify ====
- Matt Giovonizzi (Independent), healthcare director
- Tim Harris (Independent), author and business advisor

== General election ==
=== Predictions ===
Source	Ranking	As of
CBS News	Lean D	October 30, 2026
The Cook Political Report	Lean D	November 2, 2026
Decision Desk HQ	Likely D	November 3, 2026
The Economist (Note: The Economist's prediction model uses unconventional terminology. For the purpose of equivalency, their "Very Likely" ratings are formatted as a "Likely" rating while "Likely" ratings are formatted as a "Lean" rating.)	Likely D	November 3, 2026
FiftyPlusOne	Likely D	November 3, 2026
Fox News	Lean D	November 1, 2026
Inside Elections	Tilt D	October 29, 2026
MS NOW	Lean D	October 29, 2026
NBC News	Lean D	November 3, 2026
RealClearPolitics	Lean D	November 2, 2026
Sabato's Crystal Ball	Likely D	November 2, 2026
Silver Bulletin	Solid D	November 3, 2026
Split Ticket	Safe D	November 2, 2026

=== Post-primary endorsements ===
Chris Pappas (D)

Statewide officials

- Gavin Newsom, governor of California (2019–present)

State legislators

- Rick Russman, former state senator (Republican)

Individuals

- Don Bolduc, retired brigadier general and Republican 2022 U.S. Senate nominee (Republican)

Labor unions

- National Education Association

Organizations

- J Street
John E. Sununu (R)

Executive branch officials

- Scott Brown, former ambassador to New Zealand and Samoa (2017–2020)
- George W. Bush, former president of the United States (2001–2009)

U.S. senators

- John Cornyn, Texas (2002–present)

Party officials

- Joe Gruters, chair of the Republican National Committee (2025–present), Florida's SD-22 (2018–present)

Organizations

- Conservative Political Action Conference
- NRA Political Victory Fund
- Republican Jewish Coalition

Newspapers and media

- New Hampshire Union Leader

=== Fundraising ===
Campaign finance reports as of October 14, 2026
Candidate	Raised	Spent	Cash on hand
Chris Pappas (D)	$23,703,648	$22,126,867	$1,984,366
John E. Sununu (R)	$5,681,528	$3,936,991	$1,711,396
Source: Federal Election Commission

=== Polling ===
Aggregate polls

Source of poll aggregation	Dates administered	Dates updated	Chris Pappas (D)	John E. Sununu (R)	Other/Undecided	Margin
270toWin	October 2 – November 1, 2026	November 3, 2026	50.8%	42.6%	6.6%	Pappas +8.2%
Decision Desk HQ	through November 1, 2026	November 3, 2026	52.0%	43.6%	4.4%	Pappas +8.4%
FiftyPlusOne	through November 1, 2026	November 3, 2026	51.8%	43.0%	6.9%	Pappas +6.9%
RealClearPolitics	October 2 – November 1, 2026	November 2, 2026	50.8%	42.8%	6.4%	Pappas +8.0%
Silver Bulletin	through November 1, 2026	November 3, 2026	51.3%	43.1%	5.6%	Pappas +8.2%
Average			51.3%	43.0%	5.7%	Pappas +8.3%

Poll source	Date(s) administered	Sample size	Margin of error	Chris Pappas (D)	John E. Sununu (R)	Other	Undecided
AtlasIntel	October 28 – November 1, 2026	1,057 (LV)	± 3.0%	52%	44%	2% (Note: "Would not vote" with 2%)	2%
University of New Hampshire	October 27–31, 2026	2,040 (LV)	± 2.2%	54%	42%	2% (Note: Edmond LaPlante (C) with 2%; Another candidate with <1%)	2%
National Public Affairs (R)	October 25–29, 2026	800 (LV)	± 3.5%	51%	45%	2% (Note: Edmond LaPlante (C) with 2%)	2%
Rasmussen Reports (R)	October 20–23, 2026	970 (LV)	± 3.0%	50%	44%	4%	2%
Saint Anselm College	October 19–20, 2026	1,672 (LV)	± 2.4%	50%	43%	5%	2%
UMass Lowell/YouGov	October 2–19, 2026	600 (LV)	± 5.0%	48%	41%	4% (Note: Edmond LaPlante (C) with 4%)	7%
National Public Affairs (R)	October 8–12, 2026	600 (LV)	± 4.0%	50%	45%	—	5%
National Public Affairs (R)	October 8–12, 2026	600 (LV)	± 4.0%	50%	43%	4%	3%
YouGov	September 28 – October 5, 2026	1,520 (LV)	± 3.9%	51%	43%	1%	4%
Rasmussen Reports (R)	October 2–4, 2026	979 (LV)	± 3.0%	49%	44%	3%	4%
Saint Anselm College (Note: Poll sponsored by AARP)	September 28–29, 2026	1,042 (LV)	± 3.0%	51%	44%	3% (Note: "Someone else" with 3%)	1%
Trafalgar Group (R)	September 26–27, 2026	1,082 (LV)	± 2.9%	47%	41%	1% (Note: Edmond LaPlante (C) with 1%)	11%
New York Times/Siena University	September 15–22, 2026	613 (LV)	± 4.9%	50%	45%	—	5%
University of New Hampshire	September 17–21, 2026	1,418 (LV)	± 2.6%	50%	42%	4% (Note: Edmond LaPlante (C) with 2%; Another candidate with 2%)	4%
InsiderAdvantage (R)	September 16–17, 2026	1,200 (LV)	± 2.8%	48%	40%	3% (Note: Matt Giovonizzi (I), Tim Harris (I), and Edmond LaPlante (C) with 1%)	9%
co/efficient (R)	September 9–11, 2026	958 (LV)	± 3.2%	46%	46%	–	9%
Rasmussen Reports (R)	September 8–10, 2026	1,000 (LV)	± 2.0%	45%	34%	13% (Note: Day (I) with 4%; Harris (I) with 4%; Laplante (C) with 2%; Lopez (I) with 2%; Morrow (I) with 1%)	9%
	September 8, 2026	Primary elections are held					
Fabrizio, Lee, & Associates (R) (Note: Poll sponsored by the NRSC)	August 27–30, 2026	600 (LV)	± 4.0%	36%	37%	4% (Note: Aaron Day (I), Christine Lopez (I), and Tim Harris (I) with 1%; Jeanne Morrow (I) with <1%)	23%
University of New Hampshire	August 20–24, 2026	1,878 (LV)	± 2.3%	43%	45%	5% (Note: "Write in someone else" with 5%)	7%
Saint Anselm College	August 17–18, 2026	1,411 (LV)	± 2.6%	48%	41%	—	11%
Peak Insights (R)	June 24–27, 2026	500 (LV)	± 4.0%	43%	42%	—	15%
Saint Anselm College	June 24–25, 2026	1,614 (RV)	± 2.4%	47%	41%	—	12%
University of New Hampshire	June 18–23, 2026	2,232 (LV)	± 2.1%	47%	44%	2%	7%
University of New Hampshire	April 17–21, 2026	1,295 (LV)	± 2.7%	49%	42%	4% (Note: "Another candidate" with 4%)	6%
Emerson College	March 21–23, 2026	1,000 (LV)	± 2.9%	45%	44%	5%	6%
Saint Anselm College	March 16–18, 2026	1,491 (RV)	± 2.5%	46%	43%	—	11%
yes. every kid.	January 28–29, 2026	563 (LV)	± 4.1%	45%	41%	—	14%
University of New Hampshire	January 15–19, 2026	2,053 (LV)	± 2.1%	50%	45%	1%	5%
NHJournal/Praecones Analytica	December 26–28, 2025	603 (RV)	± 4.0%	42%	36%	—	22%
Guidant Polling and Strategy (R)	December 9–11, 2025	600 (LV)	± 4.0%	47%	44%	—	9%
Saint Anselm College	November 18–19, 2025	2,212 (RV)	—	44%	41%	—	16%
co/efficient (R)	October 9–13, 2025	1,034 (LV)	± 3.1%	45%	42%	—	12%
University of New Hampshire	September 17–23, 2025	1,235 (LV)	± 2.8%	49%	43%	1%	7%
co/efficient (R)	September 10–12, 2025	904 (LV)	± 3.3%	46%	43%	—	11%
1892 Polling (R)	September 2–4, 2025	500 (LV)	± 4.4%	45%	43%	—	12%

Hypothetical polling

Chris Pappas vs. Scott Brown

Aggregate polls

Source of poll aggregation	Dates administered	Dates updated	Chris Pappas	Scott Brown	Other/Undecided	Margin
270toWin	June 30 – June 30, 2026	July 13, 2026	50.0%	37.0%	13.0%	Pappas +13.0%
Race to the WH	through June 25, 2026	August 17, 2026	48.4%	36.4%	15.2%	Pappas +12.0%
RealClearPolitics	March 21 – June 25, 2026	July 13, 2026	49.3%	37.7%	13.0%	Pappas +11.6%
Average			49.2%	37.0%	13.7%	Pappas +12.2%

Poll source	Date(s) administered	Sample size	Margin of error	Chris Pappas (D)	Scott Brown (R)	Other	Undecided
University of New Hampshire	August 20–24, 2026	1,878 (LV)	± 2.3%	45%	40%	5% (Note: "Write in someone else" with 5%)	10%
Saint Anselm College	August 17–18, 2026	1,411 (LV)	± 2.6%	49%	37%	—	13%
Saint Anselm College	June 24–25, 2026	1,614 (RV)	± 2.4%	48%	36%	—	16%
University of New Hampshire	June 18–23, 2026	2,232 (LV)	± 2.1%	52%	38%	2%	8%
University of New Hampshire	April 17–21, 2026	1,295 (LV)	± 2.7%	52%	38%	3% (Note: "Another candidate" with 3%)	7%
Emerson College	March 21–23, 2026	1,000 (LV)	± 2.9%	48%	39%	6% (Note: "Someone else" with 6%)	7%
Saint Anselm College	March 16–18, 2026	1,491 (RV)	± 2.5%	47%	38%	—	15%
University of New Hampshire	January 15–19, 2026	2,053 (LV)	± 2.1%	52%	42%	1%	5%
NHJournal/Praecones Analytica	December 26–28, 2025	603 (RV)	± 4.0%	46%	28%	—	26%
Guidant Polling and Strategy (R)	December 9–11, 2025	600 (LV)	± 4.0%	49%	38%	—	13%
Saint Anselm College	November 18–19, 2025	2,212 (RV)	—	44%	36%	—	20%
co/efficient (R)	October 9–13, 2025	1,034 (LV)	± 3.1%	49%	39%	—	13%
University of New Hampshire	September 17–23, 2025	1,235 (LV)	± 2.8%	52%	37%	2% (Note: "Another candidate" with 2%)	8%
co/efficient (R)	September 10–12, 2025	904 (LV)	± 3.3%	50%	40%	—	10%
Saint Anselm College	August 26–27, 2025	1,776 (RV)	± 2.3%	48%	37%	—	15%

Chris Pappas vs. Dan Innis

Poll source	Date(s) administered	Sample size	Margin of error	Chris Pappas (D)	Dan Innis (R)	Undecided
co/efficient (R)	September 10–12, 2025	904 (LV)	± 3.3%	49%	37%	14%
Saint Anselm College	August 26–27, 2025	1,776 (RV)	± 2.3%	48%	30%	22%

Chris Pappas vs. Chris Sununu

Poll source	Date(s) administered	Sample size	Margin of error	Chris Pappas (D)	Chris Sununu (R)	Undecided
Quantus Insights (R) (Note: Poll sponsored by Trending Politics, a conservative news website)	March 17–19, 2025	650 (RV)	± 3.8%	44%	53%	3%

Jeanne Shaheen vs. Chris Sununu

Poll source	Date(s) administered	Sample size	Margin of error	Jeanne Shaheen (D)	Chris Sununu (R)	Undecided
Praecones Analytica (Note: Poll conducted for the NHJournal)	February 26 – March 1, 2025	626 (RV)	± 4.5%	46%	54%	—

Jeanne Shaheen vs. Frank Edelblut

Poll source	Date(s) administered	Sample size	Margin of error	Jeanne Shaheen (D)	Frank Edelblut (R)	Undecided
Praecones Analytica	February 26 – March 1, 2025	626 (RV)	± 4.5%	59%	41%	—

Jeanne Shaheen vs. Scott Brown

Poll source	Date(s) administered	Sample size	Margin of error	Jeanne Shaheen (D)	Scott Brown (R)	Undecided
Praecones Analytica	February 26 – March 1, 2025	626 (RV)	± 4.5%	55%	45%	—

Generic Democrat vs. generic Republican

Poll source	Date(s) administered	Sample size	Margin of error	Generic Democrat	Generic Republican	Undecided
co/efficient (R)	October 9–13, 2025	1,034 (LV)	± 3.1%	47%	44%	9%

=== Results ===
2026 United States Senate election in New Hampshire
Party	Candidate	Votes	%	±%
Democratic	Chris Pappas	356,425	55.91	
Republican	John E. Sununu	268,712	42.19	
Constitution	Edmond J. LaPlante Jr.	12,081	1.90	
Write-in				
Total votes		637,218	100.0	

Counties that flipped from Democratic to Republican

- Belknap County (largest municipality: Laconia)
- Coos County (largest municipality: Berlin)

== Analysis ==
=== Exit poll ===
2026 New Hampshire United States Senate election (CNN)

Demographic subgroup	Pappas	Sununu	% of total vote
Ideology
Liberals	94	5	29
Moderates	66	31	40
Conservatives	7	91	32
Party
Democrats	97	2	47
Republicans	9	90	43
Independents	60	32	10
Donald Trump job approval
Approve	4	95	36
Disapprove	87	11	60
2024 presidential vote
Kamala Harris	98	2	49
Donald Trump	7	91	42
Another candidate	48	38	3
Did not vote	67	28	3
Gender
Men	49	49	48
Women	62	36	51
Income
$100,000 or more	57	41	52
$50,000-$99,999	56	43	30
Less than $50,000	55	42	18
Race/ethnicity
White	57	42	93
Latino	57	41	3
White born-again or evangelical Christian?
Yes	20	78	15
No	62	36	85
Race by gender
White men	44	54	44
White women	54	42	46
All other voters	60	34	10
Age
18–29 years old	70	29	10
30–44 years old	60	37	19
45-64 years old	48	50	38
65 and older	59	40	33
Area type
Urban	53	44	8
Suburban	61	37	26
Rural	54	44	66
Education
College graduate	65	33	49
No college degree	47	50	51
Education by race
White college graduates	66	33	46
Non-white college graduates	62	34	3
Whites without college	48	50	47
Non-whites without college	46	50	4
Education by gender and race
White women with college degrees	72	27	25
White women without college degrees	52	46	23
White men with college degrees	58	40	20
White men without college degrees	42	55	23
Voters of color	59	38	9
Educational attainment
Advanced degree	70	29	24
Bachelor's degree	61	38	25
Associate's degree	49	49	13
Some college	52	46	18
Never attended college	41	56	18

== See also ==
- 2026 New Hampshire gubernatorial election
- 2026 New Hampshire elections

== Notes ==
Partisan clients
