= Bill Zeliff =

American politician (1936–2021)

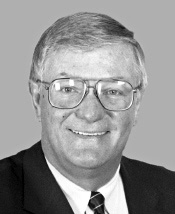

Member of the U.S. House of Representatives from New Hampshire's 1st district
- In office January 3, 1991 – January 3, 1997
- Preceded by: Bob Smith
- Succeeded by: John E. Sununu

Personal details
- Born: June 12, 1936 East Orange, New Jersey, U.S.
- Died: October 18, 2021 (aged 85) Venice, Florida, U.S.
- Party: Republican
- Spouse: Sydna Taylor
- Children: 3
- Education: University of Connecticut (BS)

William H. Zeliff Jr. (June 12, 1936 – October 18, 2021) was an American Republican politician from New Hampshire who was a member of the U.S. House of Representatives from 1991 to 1997.

== Early life ==
Zeliff was born in East Orange, New Jersey in June 1936, Zeliff graduated from Milford High School in Milford, Connecticut in 1954 and received his B.S. at the University of Connecticut in 1959, where he was a member of the Delta Chi fraternity. He served in the Connecticut Army National Guard from 1958–64 and afterwards was in the United States Army Reserve..

== Career ==
Zeliff worked as a sales and marketing manager in the consumer products division of E. I. du Pont de Nemours and Company from 1959 to 1976 and was also an innkeeper and small business owner. He ran unsuccessfully for the New Hampshire Senate in 1984 and was a delegate to the 1988 Republican National Convention which nominated George H. W. Bush for the presidency.

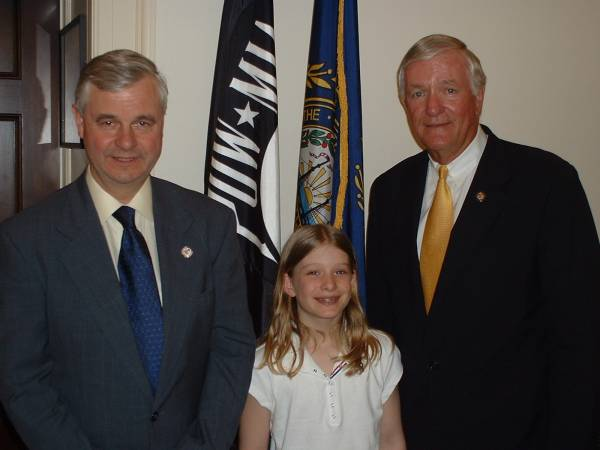
Zeliff and his granddaughter with Jeb Bradley in 2004

=== Congress ===
He was elected to the United States House of Representatives in 1990, took seat in 1991 and was reelected in 1992 and 1994.

In 1996, Zeliff opted to instead run in the gubernatorial race for Governor of New Hampshire. He lost the nomination to the chairman of the New Hampshire Board of Education Ovide Lamontagne who went on to lose the election to New Hampshire State Senator Jeanne Shaheen.

In the 2000s, Zeliff was a member of the ReFormers Caucus of Issue One.

== Personal life and death ==
Zeliff lived in Jackson, New Hampshire and Venice, Florida, and worked as a private advocate. He was married to Sydna Taylor and had three children.

He died at home in Florida on October 18, 2021, at the age of 85.

U.S. House of Representatives
Preceded by Bob Smith	Member of the U.S. House of Representatives from New Hampshire's 1st congressional district January 3, 1991 – January 3, 1997	Succeeded by John E. Sununu
