= Skylar Boutin =

American politician

Member of the New Hampshire House of Representatives from the 2nd Grafton district
- In office December 7, 2016 – December 5, 2018
- Preceded by: Rebecca A. Brown
- Succeeded by: Timothy Egan

Personal details
- Party: Republican

Skylar Boutin is an American politician. He served as a Republican member for the Grafton 2nd district of the New Hampshire House of Representatives. He was first elected in 2016. He attended Plymouth State University.
