= Energy Savings and Industrial Competitiveness Act of 2014 =

United States bill, circa 2014

- Long title: A bill to promote energy savings in residential buildings and industry, and for other purposes.
- Acronyms (colloquial): ESIC
- Announced in: the 113th United States Congress
- Sponsored by: Senator Jeanne Shaheen (D-NH)

Legislative history
- Introduced in the Senate as S. 2262 by Senator Jeanne Shaheen (D-NH) on April 28, 2014

The Energy Savings and Industrial Competitiveness Act of 2014 (ESIC; S. 2262) is a bill that focused on improving energy efficiency in the United States by reducing homeowners' energy use, improving the energy efficiency provisions of building codes, and making other changes.

The bill was introduced into the United States Senate during the 113th United States Congress.

== Background ==
According to The New York Times, the last time Congress passed a major energy bill was seven years ago.

== Provisions of the bill ==
The bill would have changed the energy efficiency requirements applied to new homes and commercial buildings. The bill "contains measures to boost building codes, train workers in energy efficient building technologies, help manufacturers become more efficient and bolster conservation efforts at federal agencies."

== Congressional Budget Office report ==
This summary is based largely on the summary provided by the Congressional Budget Office, a public domain source.

The legislation would increase direct spending by requiring Fannie Mae and Freddie Mac to revise certain standards related to underwriting mortgages. The legislation also would reduce direct spending by modifying existing requirements to reduce consumption of energy generated from fossil fuels at certain federal buildings.

== Procedural history ==
The Energy Savings and Industrial Competitiveness Act of 2014 was introduced into the United States Senate on April 28, 2014, by Senator Jeanne Shaheen (D-NH). The Senate considered the bill on May 6 and 7, 2014. On May 12, the Senate voted on a cloture motion that would have led to a final yes or no vote on passing the bill, but the cloture motion failed to pass. Only three Republicans voted in favor of cloture, with the final vote being 55–36, with 60 votes needed to pass. Majority Leader Harry Reid changed his vote from in favor to opposed at last minute so that he would be able to recall the bill for another vote at a later date.

== Debate and discussion ==
The failure of the bill to receive cloture on May 12, 2014, was seen as hurting two Democratic senators who have difficult re-election campaigns this year. Those two Senators were Jeanne Shaheen (D-NH), who sponsored the bill, and Mary Landrieu (D-LA).

According to Minority Leader Mitch McConnell (R-KY), he voted against the bill and Republicans filibustered it in general because Senator Reid refused to allow votes on a few amendments that the Republicans wanted. McConnell, arguing that the amendments were legitimate ones and not a delaying tactic, said that "it's laughable to say it's obstructionism to allow the minority to have five or six amendment votes."

Senator Rob Portman (R-OH), who co-sponsored the bill, argued that "this bill is good for American jobs and good for American energy security." After the vote to end cloture failed, Portman said that "today's failure to move forward on a bipartisan energy-efficiency bill is yet another disappointing example of Washington's dysfunction."

According to Margot Anderson, the executive director of the Bipartisan Policy Center's Energy Project, the changes made by the bill "aren't huge, bold things." Her concern with the failure of the bill was the loss of momentum on energy because "people are worried that if we can't even pass that, we're not in good shape to tackle the bigger stuff."

The Alliance to Save Energy was in favor of the bill, arguing that the bill "will help speed the transition to a more energy efficient economy, increasing both our economic competitiveness and our energy security for the coming decades, while driving economic growth and encouraging private sector job creation." The Natural Resources Defense Council also supported the bill, because the bill's "broadly supported goals are to save taxpayer dollars, promote job growth, and cut carbon pollution by increasing investments in energy efficient buildings and technologies."

A coalition of organizations, including Heritage Action, Americans for Prosperity, American Energy Alliance, the American Conservative Union, FreedomWorks and others, argued against the bill. According to the coalition, the bill is not "voluntary" as it advertises, because it "authorizes $200 million of taxpayer money to 'incentivize and assist' states and tribal groups to meet allegedly voluntary building codes" which the "taxpayer did not volunteer" to pay for. They also charge that the bill promotes corporate welfare and is duplicative of existing federal and state programs, pointing a Department of Energy "list of more than 4,200 state programs including targeted tax breaks, rebate programs, revolving loans, low-interest loans and regulations" the promote "efficiency measures and renewable energy."

== See also ==
- List of bills in the 113th United States Congress
- Energy in the United States
- Energy policy of the United States
- United States energy independence
