= Timothy Egan (politician) =

American politician

Member of the New Hampshire House of Representatives from the Grafton 2nd district
- In office December 5, 2018 – December 7, 2022
- Preceded by: Skylar Boutin
- Succeeded by: Jared Sullivan

Personal details
- Party: Democratic
- Spouse: Elizabeth

Timothy Egan is an American politician. He served as a Democratic member for the Grafton 2nd district of the New Hampshire House of Representatives.
