= Jared Sullivan =

American politician

Member of the New Hampshire House of Representatives from the Grafton 2nd district
- Incumbent
- Assumed office December 7, 2022
- Preceded by: Timothy Egan

Personal details
- Born: Beverly, Massachusetts, U.S.
- Party: Democratic
- Education: Montana State University (BS, MS)

Jared Sullivan is an American politician. He serves as a Democratic member of the New Hampshire House of Representatives from the Grafton 2nd district.

== Life and career ==
Sullivan attended Montana State University.

In November 2022, Sullivan defeated Cathy Qi in the general election for the Grafton 2nd district of the New Hampshire House of Representatives, winning 64 percent of the votes. He assumed office in December 2022.

In 2023, Sullivan endorsed Joyce Craig for governor of New Hampshire.

In September 2025, Sullivan announced that he would run in the 2026 United States Senate election in New Hampshire, however ultimately did not make it on the primary ballot.
