= 2008 United States Senate election in New Hampshire =

- November 4, 2008
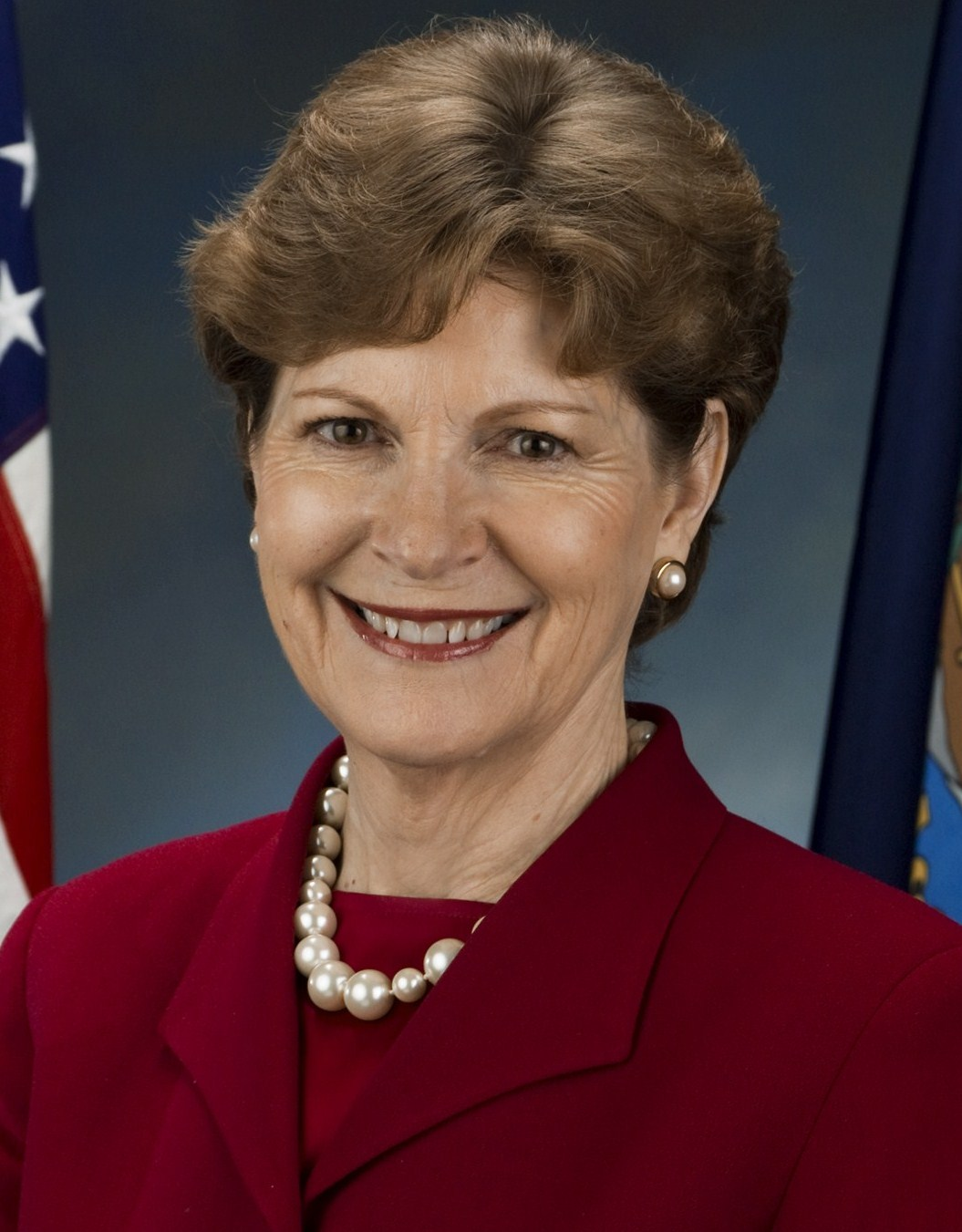

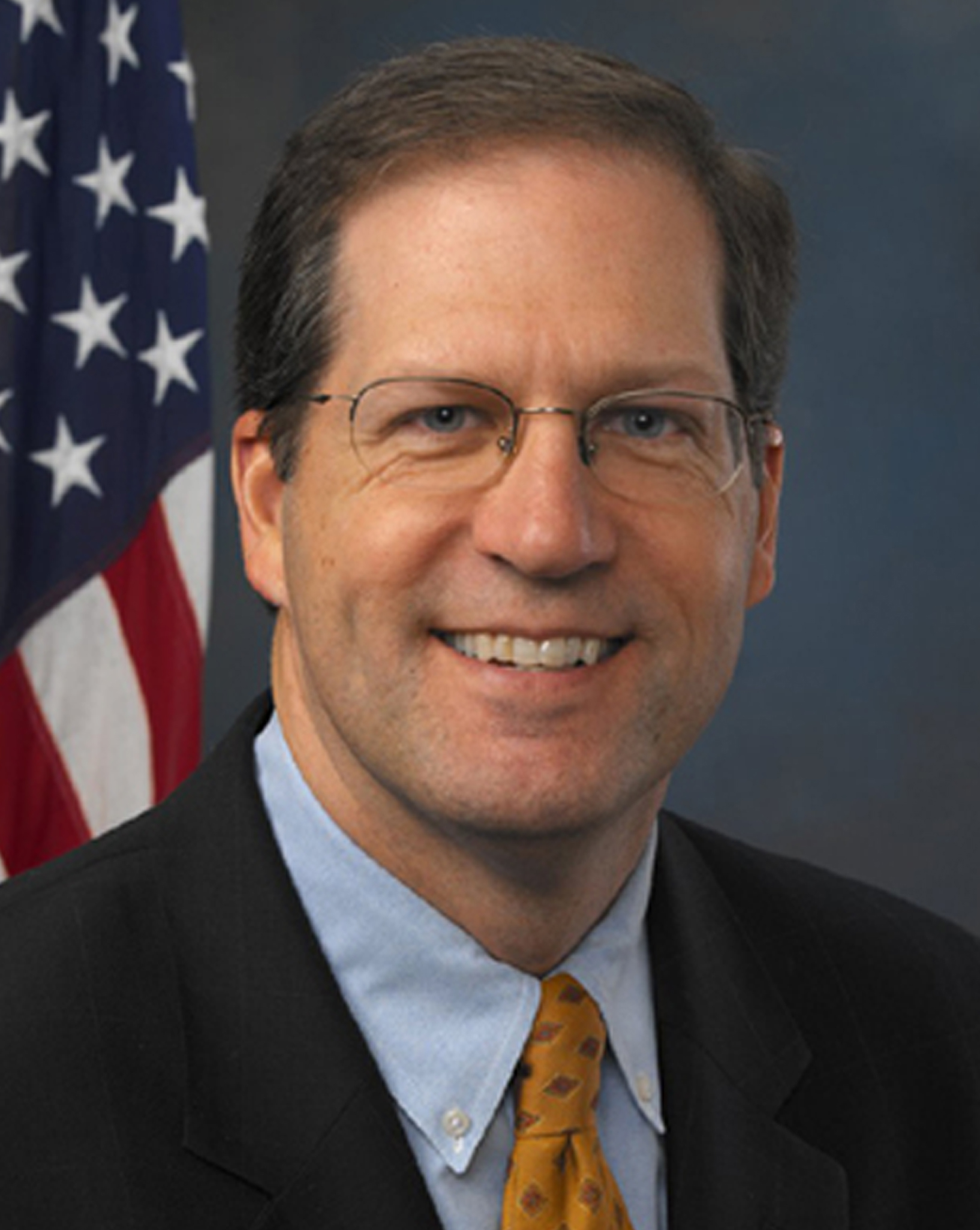
Nominee	Jeanne Shaheen	John E. Sununu
Party	Democratic	Republican
Popular vote	358,438	314,403
Percentage	51.62%	45.28%
- Shaheen: 40–50% 50–60% 60–70% 70–80% >90% Sununu: 40–50% 50–60% 60–70% 70–80% Tie: 40–50%
U.S. senator before election
John E. Sununu
Republican
Elected U.S. Senator
Jeanne Shaheen
Democratic

The 2008 United States Senate election in New Hampshire was held on November 4, 2008. Incumbent Republican U.S. Senator John E. Sununu ran for re-election to a second term, but was defeated by Democratic former Governor Jeanne Shaheen in a rematch of the 2002 election. Shaheen's win marked the first time since 1972 that a Democrat won this seat, and made her the first Democratic senator elected from New Hampshire since John A. Durkin's victory in 1975.

== Background ==
For a considerable amount of time, New Hampshire had always been considered an island of conservatism in the Northeast. Following the 2006 election, however, many offices were taken over by Democrats: Representatives Carol Shea-Porter and Paul Hodes, Governor John Lynch, the majority of the New Hampshire Executive Council, and the majority of both legislative chambers (which had not occurred since 1911). The popularity of Governor Lynch was considered an impediment to Sununu's re-election. Though the state voted for then-Gov. George W. Bush in 2000, Sen. John Kerry narrowly won the state over Bush in 2004.

This is the first general statewide election loss of a member of the Sununu family. Sununu proceeded to lose in 2026.

== Democratic primary ==
=== Candidates ===
- Jeanne Shaheen, former governor and nominee for the United States Senate in 2002.
- Raymond Stebbins, attorney

=== Campaign ===
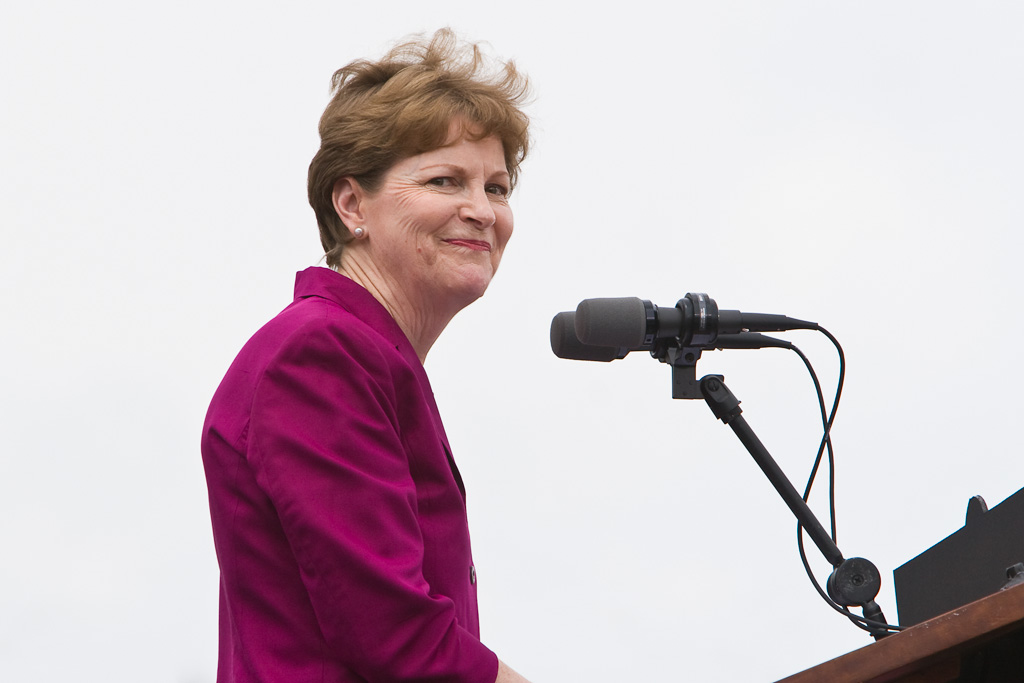
Shaheen, the Democratic nominee, at a rally in the lead-up to the election.

Astronaut Jay Buckey MD, Portsmouth Mayor Steve Marchand, and Katrina Swett (wife of former Congressman Richard Swett who ran for this seat in 1996), had announced their candidacies but withdrew in favor of former governor Jeanne Shaheen upon her entrance into the race.

Shaheen had been the Democratic nominee for the race in 2002. Since 2005, Shaheen had served as director of the Institute of Politics at Harvard Kennedy School before leaving on September 14, 2007. She had been aggressively courted to run by Senator Ted Kennedy (D-MA) on behalf of Senate Democrats, and by a "Draft Shaheen" campaign led by former New Hampshire Democratic Chairman Kathy Sullivan.

The filing deadline for the Democratic and Republican Parties was June 13, 2008. Shaheen filed, as did Raymond Stebbins.

=== Results ===
Democratic primary results
Party	Candidate	Votes	%
Democratic	Jeanne Shaheen	43,968	88.5%
Democratic	Raymond Stebbins	5,281	10.6%
Write-in		407	0.8%
Total votes		49,656	100.0%

== Republican primary ==
=== Candidates ===
- Tom Alciere, former state representative
- John E. Sununu, incumbent U.S. Senator

=== Results ===
Republican primary results
Party	Candidate	Votes	%
Republican	John Sununu (incumbent)	60,852	88.7%
Republican	Tom Alciere	7,084	10.3%
Write-in		685	1.0%
Total votes		68,621	100.0%

== General election ==
=== Candidates ===
- Ken Blevens (L)
- Jeanne Shaheen (D), former governor
- John E. Sununu (R), incumbent U.S. Senator

=== Campaign ===
A November 2006 SurveyUSA poll of New Hampshire voters found Sununu had a 47% approval rating. A February 1, 2007 poll conducted by the University of New Hampshire found that only 45% of New Hampshire voters held a favorable opinion of Sununu. In June 2007, a poll by 7NEWS and Suffolk University of likely voters reported that only 31 percent in the poll said Sununu deserved re-election, with 47 percent saying that someone else should get his seat.

A July 2008 Granite State Poll had Sununu's favorability rating at 52%, his unfavorability rating at 33%, and neutral or undecided by 16%. Shaheen is viewed favorable by 53%, unfavorable by 31% and neutral or undecided by 15%.

Senator John McCain, the Republican nominee for president, had mentioned Sununu as a possible running mate for the 2008 presidential election, as well as Lindsey Graham, Bob Riley, Steve Forbes and John Thune. Sununu had said he would remain neutral in the New Hampshire primary. However, McCain selected Alaska governor Sarah Palin instead.

=== Predictions ===
Source	Ranking	As of
The Cook Political Report	Tossup	October 23, 2008
CQ Politics	Lean D (flip)	October 31, 2008
Rothenberg Political Report	Likely D (flip)	November 2, 2008
Real Clear Politics	Lean D (flip)	November 2, 2008

=== Polling ===
Source	Date	John Sununu (R)	Jeanne Shaheen (D)	Ken Blevens (L)	Undecided
American Research Group	March 29, 2007	34%	44%	––	22%
American Research Group	June 2007	29%	57%	––	14%
Research 2000	July 2007	34%	56%	––	10%
WMUR-CNN	July 2007	38%	54%	––	7%
Rasmussen Reports	September 16, 2007	43%	48%	––	9%
American Research Group	September 18, 2007	41%	46%	––	13%
WMUR-CNN	September 2007	38%	54%	––	7%
SurveyUSA	November 5, 2007	42%	53%	––	5%
American Research Group	December 20, 2007	52%	41%	––	7%
Granite State Poll	February 11, 2008	37%	54%	––	7%
Rasmussen Reports	February 13, 2008	41%	49%	––	––
American Research Group	March 20, 2008	33%	47%	––	20%
Rasmussen Reports	March 21, 2008	41%	49%	––	––
Rasmussen Reports	May 23, 2008	43%	50%	––	––
American Research Group	June 18, 2008	40%	54%	––	6%
Rasmussen Reports	June 20, 2008	39%	53%	––	––
Granite State Poll	July 20, 2008	42%	46%	––	10%
American Research Group	July 19, 2008	36%	58%	––	––
Rasmussen Reports	July 23, 2008	45%	51%	––	––
Rasmussen Reports	August 19, 2008	43%	52%	––	––
American Research Group	August 18, 2008	41%	52%	––	7%
Public Opinion Strategies	September 3, 2008	44%	46%	3%	5%
American Research Group	September 13, 2008	40%	52%	––	8%
Granite State Poll	September 14, 2008	44%	48%	––	7%
Rasmussen Reports	September 23, 2008	52%	45%	1%	2%
Rasmussen Reports	October 1, 2008	45%	50%	1%	3%
Rasmussen Reports	October 23, 2008	46%	52%	––	––
Rasmussen Reports	October 30, 2008	44%	52%	––	––
Survey USA	October 30, 2008	40%	53%	6%	2%

=== Fundraising ===
Candidate (party)	Receipts	Disbursements	Cash on hand	Debt
Jeanne Shaheen (D)	$8,273,501.00	$8,225,580.00	$47,920.00	$120,630.00
John Sununu (R)	$8,879,307.00	$8,868,017.00	$104,187.00	$0
Source: Federal Election Commission

=== Results ===

2008 United States Senate election in New Hampshire
Party	Candidate	Votes	%	±%
Democratic	Jeanne Shaheen	358,438	51.62%	+4.95%
Republican	John Sununu (incumbent)	314,403	45.28%	−5.83%
Libertarian	Ken Blevens	21,516	3.10%	+0.89%
Total votes		694,357	100.0%	N/A
Democratic gain from Republican				

==== By county ====
County	Jeanne Shaheen Democratic		John E. Sununu Republican		Various candidates Other parties		Margin		Total votes cast
County	#	%	#	%	#	%	#	%	Total votes cast
Belknap	15,931	48.3%	16,166	49.0%	871	2.6%	-235	-0.7%	32,968
Carroll	13,428	47.3%	13,965	49.2%	986	3.5%	-537	-1.9%	28,379
Cheshire	24,788	59.7%	15,259	36.7%	1,506	3.6%	9,529	23.0%	41,553
Coos	9,031	56.6%	6,375	40.0%	543	3.4%	2,656	16.6%	15,949
Grafton	27,797	57.5%	18,957	39.2%	1,580	3.3%	8,840	18.3%	48,334
Hillsborough	97,734	48.8%	95,646	47.8%	6,763	3.3%	2,088	1.0%	200,143
Merrimack	42,646	54.1%	33,958	43.1%	2,250	2.9%	8,688	11.0%	78,854
Rockingham	78,992	48.2%	80,051	48.8%	5,004	3.1%	-1,059	-0.6%	164,047
Strafford	36,096	57.9%	24,503	39.3%	1,781	2.9%	11,593	18.6%	62,380
Sullivan	11,995	54.1%	9,523	42.9%	662	3.0%	2,472	13.2%	22,180
Totals	358,438	51.6%	314,403	45.3%	21,946	3.2%	44,035	6.3%	694,787

Counties that flipped from Republican to Democratic

- Hillsborough (largest municipality: Manchester)
- Sullivan (largest municipality: Claremont)

== See also ==
- 2008 United States Senate elections
