= John E. Sununu =

American politician (born 1964)

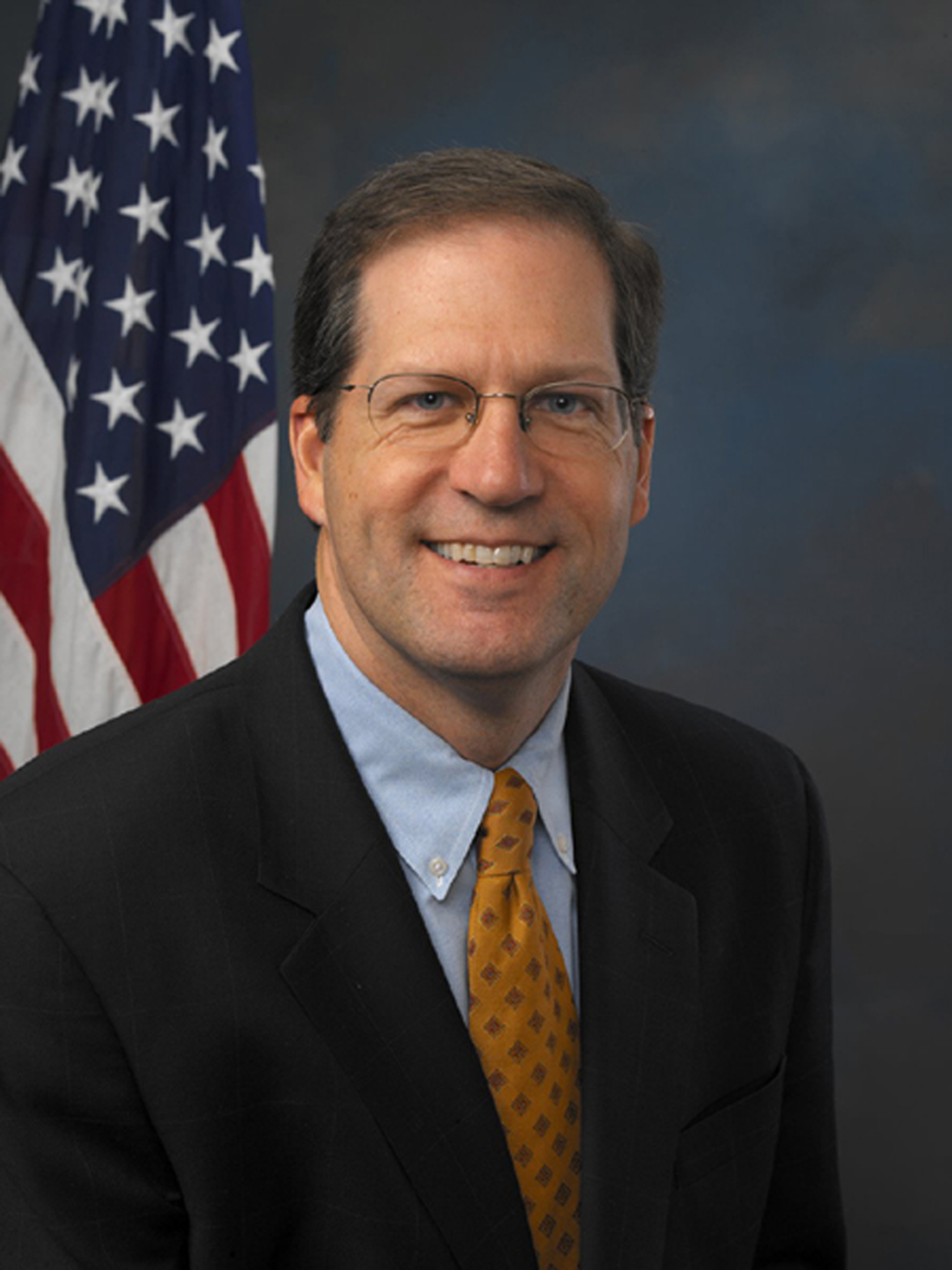
- Official portrait, 2006

United States Senator from New Hampshire
- In office January 3, 2003 – January 3, 2009
- Preceded by: Bob Smith
- Succeeded by: Jeanne Shaheen

Member of the U.S. House of Representatives from New Hampshire's 1st district
- In office January 3, 1997 – January 3, 2003
- Preceded by: Bill Zeliff
- Succeeded by: Jeb Bradley

Personal details
- Born: John Edward Sununu; September 10, 1964 (age 62) Boston, Massachusetts, U.S.
- Party: Republican
- Parents: John H. Sununu; Nancy Sununu
- Relatives: Chris Sununu (brother)
- Education: Massachusetts Institute of Technology (BS, MS); Harvard University (MBA)
- Website: Campaign website
- Sununu's voice Sununu on the treatment of small businesses in relation to the Fair Minimum Wage Act of 2007. Recorded January 23, 2007

John Edward Sununu (born September 10, 1964) is an American politician who represented the state of New Hampshire in the U.S. Senate from 2003 to 2009. A member of the Republican Party, he served in the U.S. House of Representatives from 1997 to 2003. He is the son of John H. Sununu and older brother of Chris Sununu, both of whom were governors of New Hampshire.

Sununu was first elected to the U.S. House of Representatives in 1996, and was reelected in 1998 and 2000. He was elected to the U.S. Senate in 2002, defeating Republican incumbent Bob Smith in the primary and Democrat Jeanne Shaheen in the general election. Elected to the Senate at 38 years old, he was its youngest member for his entire term. In 2008, he lost reelection to Shaheen in a rematch.

Sununu was the Republican nominee in the 2026 U.S. Senate election in New Hampshire, seeking to reclaim his old seat. He lost to Democratic congressman Chris Pappas.

== Early life and education ==
One of eight siblings, Sununu was born in Boston, Massachusetts, on September 10, 1964. He is the son of former New Hampshire First Lady Nancy (née Hayes) and former Governor of New Hampshire and White House Chief of Staff John H. Sununu.

Sununu has Lebanese, Greek, and Hispanic ancestry on his father's side. His paternal grandmother was an immigrant from El Salvador whose family had Greek roots. His paternal grandfather's family came to the United States from Lebanon as Greek Orthodox Christians at the turn of the 20th century; their ancestry was Greek and Lebanese from Jerusalem and Beirut, respectively.

Sununu earned both Bachelor of Science and Master of Science degrees in mechanical engineering from the Massachusetts Institute of Technology in 1986 and 1987, respectively. He earned a Master of Business Administration from Harvard University in 1991.

== U.S. House of Representatives ==
=== Elections ===
In 1996, incumbent Republican U.S. Representative Bill Zeliff decided to run for governor of New Hampshire. Sununu narrowly defeated Democrat Joe Keefe. In 1998, he was reelected with 67% of the vote, beating Democrat Peter Flood. He was reelected in 2000, defeating Democrat Martha Fuller Clark with 53% of the vote.

=== Tenure ===
In 1999, New Hampshire's Christian Coalition gave "pro-family" awards to both New Hampshire Representatives, Sununu and Charles Bass, honoring their votes to impeach President Bill Clinton.

On November 8, 2000, after Sununu defeated Democratic newcomer Martha Fuller Clark, The Boston Globe wrote that he had "one of the House's most conservative voting records"—opposing abortion and increased minimum wages while favoring school vouchers and the death penalty.

=== Committee assignments ===
Sununu served on the House Appropriations and Budget Committees. He held subcommittee seats on the Veterans Administration-Housing and Urban Development Subcommittee, the Treasury Postal Subcommittee, and the District of Columbia Appropriations Subcommittee, and also served as a member of the Republican Policy Committee.

== U.S. Senate ==
=== Elections ===
==== 2002 ====
In 2002, Sununu ran for a United States Senate seat from New Hampshire. In the Republican primary, he defeated Republican incumbent Bob Smith by 13,312 votes. In the November election, he subsequently defeated Democratic Governor and future senator Jeanne Shaheen by 19,751 votes.

==== 2008 ====
In a rematch, Shaheen defeated Sununu by 44,035 votes. She won seven of New Hampshire's 10 counties, losing Carroll, Belknap, and Rockingham. Sununu slightly outperformed Republican presidential candidate John McCain in the 2008 national election, as McCain got about 45% of the vote but did not win any counties.

==== 2026 ====
In late 2025, Sununu announced his candidacy for his old seat.

In 2026, Sununu sought the Republican nomination for the U.S. Senate seat being vacated by Jeanne Shaheen. He received Donald Trump's endorsement and entered the September 8 Republican primary as the front-runner against former Massachusetts senator Scott Brown, which he won by a wide margin.

=== Tenure ===
According to a study in The Washington Post, Sununu voted with the Republican Party's position 84% of the time. However, he broke with his party on prominent issues, joining Democrats in filibusters of the USA PATRIOT Act and the Bush administration's 2003 energy bill. Sununu strongly supported greater access to firearms, voting against the proposed renewal of the 1994 Federal Assault Weapons Ban in 2004. In 2006, he voted against the Federal Marriage Amendment, a proposed constitutional amendment to ban gay marriage. He strongly opposed amnesty for illegal immigrants, voting against the McCain-Kennedy immigration bill in July 2007. Sununu called for a tougher federal regulator for government-sponsored enterprises Fannie Mae and Freddie Mac, and with Senator Tim Johnson (D-SD), he filed a dramatic overhaul of regulation of the insurance industry. A long time proponent of technology, in January 2007, Sununu called for a permanent ban on taxes of Internet connections and online sales.

The non-partisan National Journal gave Sununu a composite rating of 65.8% conservative and 34.2% liberal in 2008. Sununu was one of only three senators whose voting record received a score of 100% from the fiscally conservative Club for Growth, in both 2005 and 2006, tying for 1st place. However, his rating fell to 23rd place in 2007, and to 34th place in 2008. The Club for Growth endorsed Sununu's unsuccessful bid for re-election in February 2007 against Jeanne Shaheen (she subsequently during 2009–2012 earned Club for Growth ratings of 64th place to 100th place).

He also supported the bipartisan Clean Energy Stimulus Act of 2008 that provides tax incentives for the development of clean and renewable energy sources. Sununu opposed the Climate Stewardship Act of 2003, which would have also created a cap-and-trade program. His vote was criticized by the New Hampshire Democratic Party which claimed that he had acted "against reducing greenhouse gases". The New Hampshire Union Leader praised his decision, citing the Energy Information Administration's estimation that the legislation would cost the American economy $507 billion over 22 years.

He also became well known as one of the five Republican senators who joined Democrats in a filibuster of the USA PATRIOT Act renewal conference report, concerned about possible negative impacts the bill had on civil liberties. This caused the Republican leadership to extend the original legislation until a compromise bill was forged.

In January 2006, at a hearing in front of the Commerce, Science and Transportation Committee on the Broadcast Flag, Sununu was one of the very few present to criticize the legislation, saying "In all cases [of previous technological advancements in the US], we didn't need to step in with a significant statutory government-regulated mandate on technology that consumers use to enjoy this material".

In October 2006, Sununu voted against a portion of the Military Commissions Act of 2006 that would suspend the right of habeas corpus for non-citizen detainees. After voting in favor of the final bill, he defended his vote by telling reporters "The Constitution is not a suicide pact".

On March 14, 2007, Sununu became the first Republican senator to call for the firing of Attorney General Alberto Gonzales. Sununu cited Gonzales's mass firings of staff in the U.S. attorney office, Gonzales's support for the renewal of the Patriot Act, and a report that the FBI had underreported its use of national security letters to spy on Americans as reasons to support the firing.

In July 2005, Sununu shaved his head to show solidarity with Senator Arlen Specter, who had lost his hair due to chemotherapy for Hodgkin's disease.

In September 2008, Sununu became one of twenty senators (ten Democrats and ten Republicans) co-sponsoring a bipartisan energy bill, the New Energy Reform Act of 2008. The bill was offered as an alternative to the Democrats' energy bill, sponsored by House Speaker Nancy Pelosi. Both bills proposed to increase offshore drilling, while promoting conservation and alternative energy. The "Gang of Twenty" bill also would have let coastal states participate in decisions and in revenue about drilling in the fifty-to-one-hundred-mile range off their coasts. It also differs from the Democrats' bill in allowing drilling off Florida's west coast, a proposal both Florida's senators have protested. To quote the Minneapolis Star Tribune, "Nearly every potentially vulnerable Senate Republican, from Norm Coleman [of Minnesota] to Elizabeth Dole of North Carolina and John Sununu of New Hampshire, has signed on to the legislation."

=== Committee assignments ===
- Committee on Finance
- Committee on Commerce, Science, and Transportation
  - Subcommittee on Aviation Operations, Safety, and Security
  - Subcommittee on Interstate Commerce, Trade, and Tourism
  - Subcommittee on Oceans, Atmosphere, Fisheries, and Coast Guard
  - Subcommittee on Science, Technology, and Innovation
  - Subcommittee on Space, Aeronautics, and Related Agencies
- Committee on Homeland Security and Governmental Affairs
  - Ad Hoc Subcommittee on State, Local, and Private Sector Preparedness and Integration (Ranking Member)
  - Permanent Subcommittee on Investigations
  - Subcommittee on Federal Financial Management, Government Information, Federal Services, and International Security
- Joint Economic Committee

== Later career ==
As of 2009 Sununu sat on the Board of Managers of ConvergEx Holdings, a holding company for BNY ConvergEx Group, an affiliate of Bank of New York Mellon, which holds a 33.8% stake in BNY ConvergEx Group.

On July 7, 2010, Akin Gump Strauss Hauer & Feld LLP announced that Sununu was joining the firm as an adjunct senior policy advisor. Akin Gump is one of the largest law firms and lobbying firms in Washington, D.C.

Sununu was appointed by Senate Minority Leader Mitch McConnell to serve on the Congressional Oversight Panel (COP) for the Troubled Asset Relief Program funds, whose purpose is to assess how the TARP worked, in order to help Congress determine whether to continue injecting capital into the financial sector.

Before the 2014 election cycle, speculation abounded that he would pursue a rematch against Shaheen, but in April 2013, he said he would not.

On January 30, 2019, Lloyd's of London announced Sununu had been appointed to its governing council.

== Personal life ==
Sununu has been married to Catherine "Kitty" Halloran since 1988. They have three children.

== Electoral history ==
New Hampshire's 1st congressional district: Results 1996–2000
Year	Democrat	Votes	Pct	Republican	Votes	Pct	3rd Party	Party	Votes	Pct
1996	Joe Keefe	115,462	47%	John E. Sununu	123,939	50%	Gary A. Flanders	Libertarian	8,176	3%
1998	Peter Flood	51,783	33%	John E. Sununu (incumbent)	104,430	67%				
2000	Martha Fuller Clark	128,387	45%	John E. Sununu (incumbent)	150,609	53%	Dan Belforti	Libertarian	5,713	2%

New Hampshire Senator (Class II) results: 2002–2008
Year	Democrat	Votes	Pct	Republican	Votes	Pct	3rd Party	Party	Votes	Pct	3rd Party	Party	Votes	Pct	
2002	Jeanne Shaheen	207,478	46%	John E. Sununu	227,229	51%	Ken Blevens	Libertarian	9,835	2%	Bob Smith	Write-in	2,396	1%	*
2008	Jeanne Shaheen	357,153	52%	John E. Sununu (incumbent)	312,601	45%	Ken Blevens	Libertarian	21,381	3%					

*Write-in and minor candidate notes: In 2002, write-ins received 197 votes.

== See also ==
- List of Arab and Middle-Eastern Americans in the United States Congress
- List of Hispanic and Latino Americans in the United States Congress
- List of Greek Americans

U.S. House of Representatives
Preceded by Bill Zeliff	Member of the U.S. House of Representatives from New Hampshire's 1st congressional district 1997–2003	Succeeded by Jeb Bradley
Party political offices
Preceded by Bob Smith	Republican nominee for U.S. Senator from New Hampshire (Class 2); 2002, 2008	Succeeded by Scott Brown
Preceded by Corky Messner	Republican nominee for U.S. Senator from New Hampshire (Class 2); 2026	Most recent
U.S. Senate
Preceded by Bob Smith	U.S. Senator (Class 2) from New Hampshire; 2003–2009; Served alongside: Judd Gregg	Succeeded by Jeanne Shaheen
Honorary titles
Preceded by Peter Fitzgerald	Baby of the Senate; 2003–2009	Succeeded by Mark Pryor
U.S. order of precedence (ceremonial)
Preceded by David Perdue as Former U.S. Senator	Order of precedence of the United States	Succeeded by Paul Trible as Former U.S. Senator
