= Jeanne Shaheen =

American politician (born 1947)

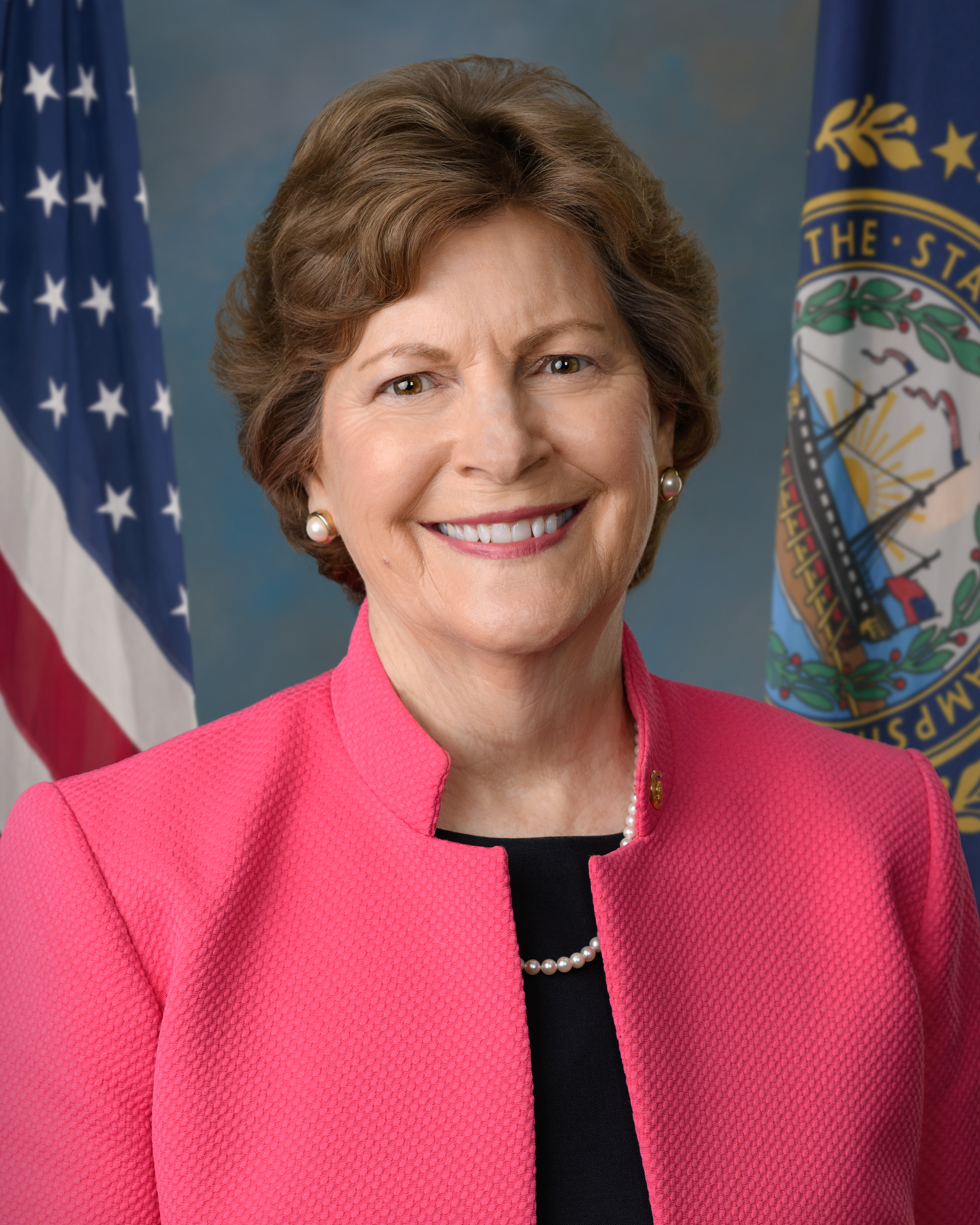
- Official portrait, 2021

United States Senator from New Hampshire
- Incumbent
- Assumed office January 3, 2009 Serving with Maggie Hassan
- Preceded by: John Sununu
Senate positions
Ranking Member of the Senate Foreign Relations Committee
Incumbent
Assumed office January 3, 2025
Preceded by	Jim Risch
Chair of the Senate Small Business Committee
In office September 27, 2023 – January 3, 2025
Preceded by	Ben Cardin
Succeeded by	Joni Ernst
Ranking Member of the Senate Small Business Committee
In office April 2, 2015 – February 6, 2018
Preceded by	Ben Cardin
Succeeded by	Ben Cardin

78th Governor of New Hampshire
- In office January 9, 1997 – January 9, 2003
- Preceded by: Steve Merrill
- Succeeded by: Craig Benson

Member of the New Hampshire Senate from the 21st district
- In office December 5, 1990 – December 4, 1996
- Preceded by: Franklin Torr
- Succeeded by: Katie Wheeler

Personal details
- Born: Cynthia Jeanne Bowers; January 28, 1947 (age 79) St. Charles, Missouri, U.S.
- Party: Democratic
- Spouse: William Shaheen (m. 1972)
- Children: 3, including Stefany
- Education: Shippensburg University (BA); University of Mississippi (MSS)
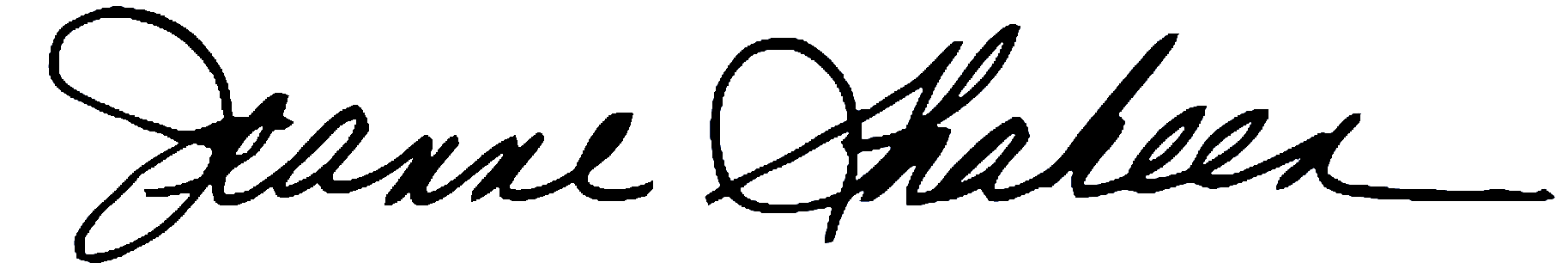
- Signature
- Website: Senate website Campaign website
- Shaheen's voice Shaheen supporting Julianne Smith for U.S. Ambassador to NATO; Recorded November 18, 2021

Cynthia Jeanne Shaheen (/ˈdʒiːn ʃəˈhiːn/ JEEN shə-HEEN; née Bowers, born January 28, 1947) is an American politician and former educator serving since 2009 as the senior United States senator from New Hampshire. A member of the Democratic Party, she served from 1997 to 2003 as the 78th governor of New Hampshire. Shaheen is the first woman elected both governor and a U.S. senator, and was the first elected female governor of New Hampshire.

After serving two terms in the New Hampshire Senate, Shaheen was elected governor in 1996 and reelected in 1998 and 2000. In 2002, she unsuccessfully ran for the U.S. Senate against Republican nominee John E. Sununu. She served as director of the Harvard Institute of Politics before resigning to run for the U.S. Senate again in the 2008 election, defeating Sununu in a rematch. She has been the dean of New Hampshire’s congressional delegation since 2011, when Senator Judd Gregg retired.

Shaheen became the first Democratic senator from New Hampshire since John A. Durkin. In 2014, she became the second Democrat from New Hampshire to be reelected to the Senate since Thomas J. McIntyre in 1972. She was reelected to a third term in 2020. Upon Dianne Feinstein's death in 2023, Shaheen became the oldest serving female U.S. senator. On March 12, 2025, she announced that she would not seek reelection in 2026. She will be succeeded by fellow Democrat Chris Pappas.

== Early life and education ==
Jeanne Shaheen was born Cynthia Jeanne Bowers in St. Charles, Missouri, the daughter of Belle Ernestine (Stillings) and Ivan E. Bowers.

Shaheen graduated from high school in Selinsgrove, Pennsylvania, and earned a bachelor's degree in English from Shippensburg University of Pennsylvania and a master's degree in political science from the University of Mississippi. She taught high school in Mississippi and moved to New Hampshire in 1973, where she also taught school.

== Early political career ==
As a Democrat, she worked on several campaigns, including Jimmy Carter's 1976 presidential campaign, and as the New Hampshire campaign manager for Gary Hart in 1984, before running for office in 1990, when she was elected to the state Senate for the 21st district. She was elected governor of New Hampshire in 1996 and reelected in 1998 and 2000.

In April 2005, Shaheen was named director of Harvard's Institute of Politics, succeeding former U.S. Representative and Secretary of Agriculture Dan Glickman.

== Governorship ==
Shaheen's decision to run for New Hampshire governor followed the retirement of Republican Governor Steve Merrill. Her opponent in 1996 was Ovide M. Lamontagne, then chairman of the State Board of Education. Shaheen presented herself as a moderate. According to a PBS profile, she focused on education funding issues, and pledged to expand kindergarten. She defeated Lamontagne by 87,854 votes.

Shaheen was the first woman to be elected governor of New Hampshire. (She was not, however, the first woman to serve as New Hampshire's governor; Vesta M. Roy was acting governor from December 30, 1982, until January 6, 1983.)

In 1998, she was reelected by 112,296 votes.

In both 1996 and 1998, Shaheen took a no-new-taxes pledge. After a court decision preventing education from being largely supported by local taxes, "her administration devised a plan that would have increased education spending and set a statewide property tax."

Running for a third term in 2000, Shaheen refused to renew her no-new-taxes pledge, becoming the first New Hampshire governor in 38 years to win an election without making that pledge. Shaheen's preferred solution to the school-funding problem was not a broad-based tax but legalized video-gambling at state racetracks—a solution repeatedly rejected by the state legislature.

In 2001, Shaheen tried to implement a 2.5% sales tax, the first broad-based tariff of its kind in New Hampshire, which has never had a sales tax. The state legislature rejected her proposal. She also proposed an increase in the state's cigarette tax and a 4.5% capital gains tax.

== Presidential politics ==
=== 2000 ===
During the 2000 Democratic presidential primary in New Hampshire, Shaheen supported Al Gore, and her husband served as Gore's New Hampshire campaign manager. According to the New York Observer, the Shaheens were critical in helping Gore win a narrow victory in the New Hampshire primary over Bill Bradley.

Gore added Shaheen to his short list of potential vice presidential nominees, which also included Indiana Senator Evan Bayh, North Carolina Senator John Edwards, House Minority Leader Dick Gephardt, Massachusetts Senator John Kerry, and Connecticut Senator Joe Lieberman. Shaheen responded to speculation by stating she wasn't interested in the job. There has since been discussion over whether Gore would have won the election had he picked Shaheen as his running mate.

=== 2004 ===
After a short time teaching at Harvard University (and a fellowship in the Institute of Politics with former Massachusetts Governor Jane Swift), Shaheen was named national chairperson of John Kerry's 2004 presidential campaign in September 2003.

== U.S. Senate ==
=== Elections ===
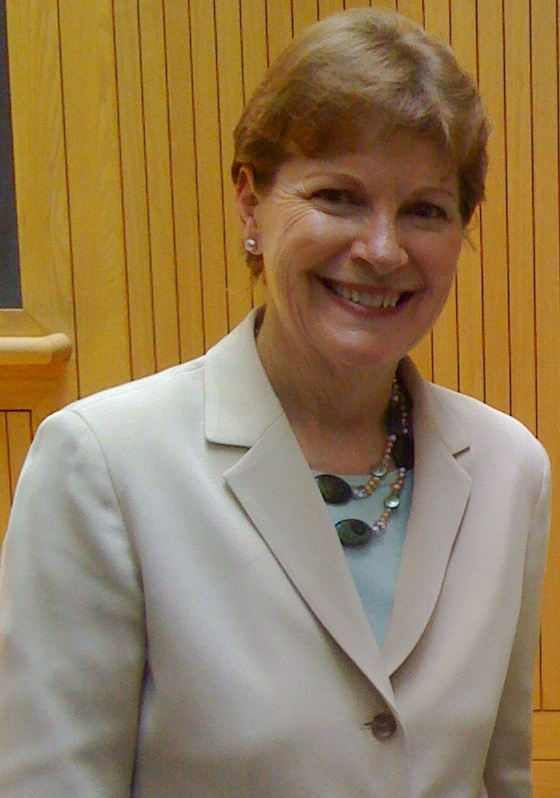
Shaheen on the campaign trail at Dartmouth College, July 2008

==== 2002 ====
After three two-year terms as governor, Shaheen declined to run for a fourth, instead choosing to run for the U.S. Senate in 2002. Republican John E. Sununu defeated her by 19,751 votes. In an interview with the Concord Monitor, Shaheen attributed her loss in part to "discussion about the job that [she] did as governor." At that time, early Republican advertisements slammed her support for putting a sales tax on the ballot or faulted her for failing schools.

In June 2004, former Republican consultant Allen Raymond pleaded guilty to jamming the phone lines of the New Hampshire Democratic Party's 2002 get-out-the-vote operation; some believe this interference contributed to Shaheen's loss, including former Senator Bob Smith, whom Sununu had defeated in the Republican primary. In February 2005, a judge sentenced Raymond to five months in prison. Former state GOP executive director Charles McGee was sentenced to seven months for his role.

Raymond alleged that James Tobin, Northeast field director for the National Republican Senatorial Committee, masterminded the plot. In December 2005, Tobin was convicted of two federal felonies arising from the phone-jamming and sentenced to ten months in prison, but his conviction was reversed on appeal. In October 2008, prosecutors filed two new felony indictments charging that Tobin lied to an FBI agent when he was interviewed in 2003 about his role in the phone-jamming case. These charges were summarily dismissed in 2009 after the federal judge in Maine's District Court found them motivated by "vindictive prosecution".

==== 2008 ====
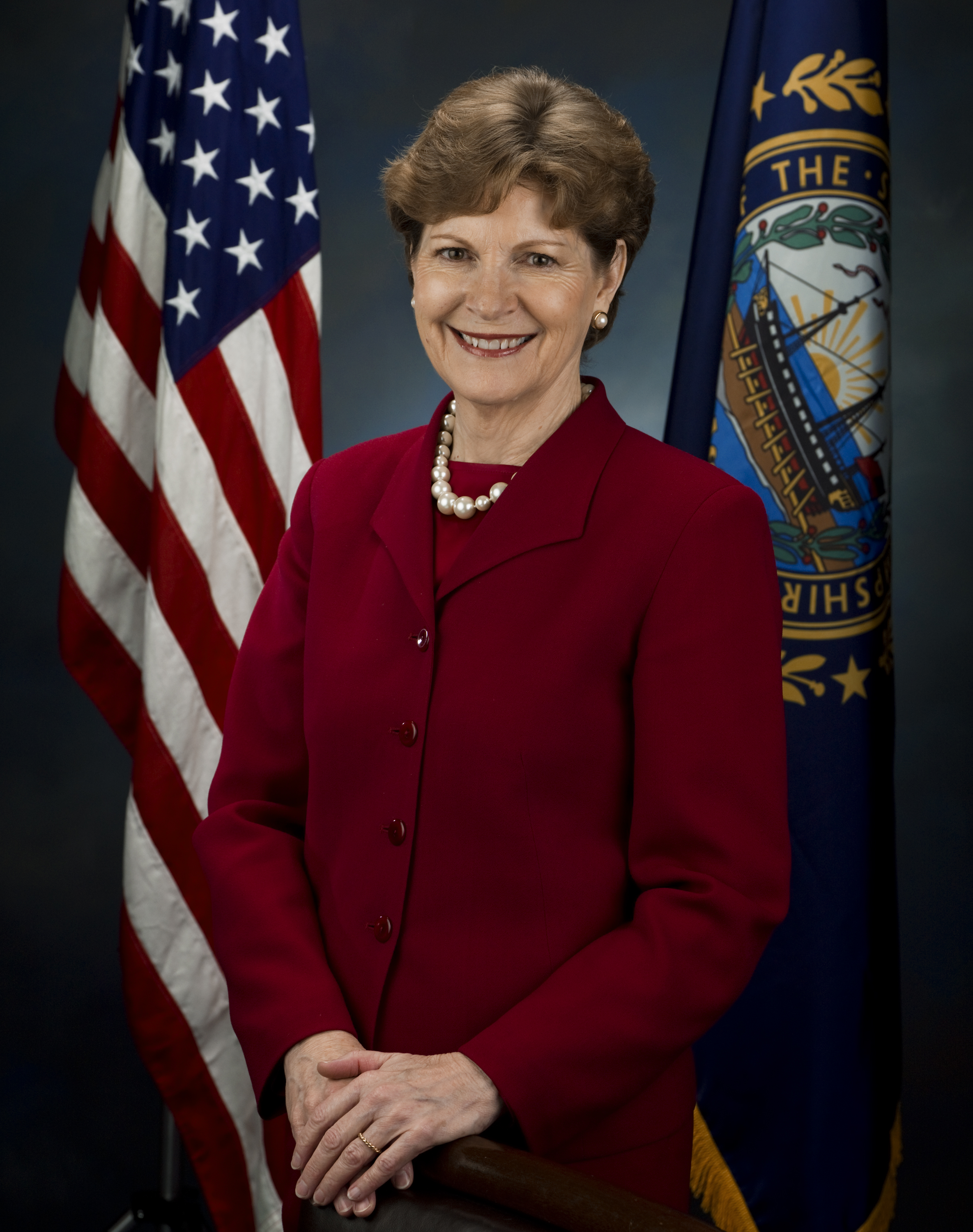
Official portrait, 2009

In early July 2007, University of New Hampshire Survey Center poll found that even though Shaheen had not yet announced whether she would run for Senate, she would beat Sununu in the 2008 Senate race 54–38. By contrast, all the Democratic candidates already in the race trailed Sununu in polling.

In April 2007, Shaheen met with Senate Majority Leader Harry Reid and Democratic Senatorial Campaign Committee Chairman Chuck Schumer about a Senate run. Both said she would have strong support from the DSCC if she ran. On September 14, 2007, Shaheen announced her candidacy. On September 15, she formally launched her campaign at her home in Madbury, New Hampshire. On September 21, EMILY's List endorsed her campaign.

Shaheen defeated Sununu by 44,535 votes.

==== 2014 ====
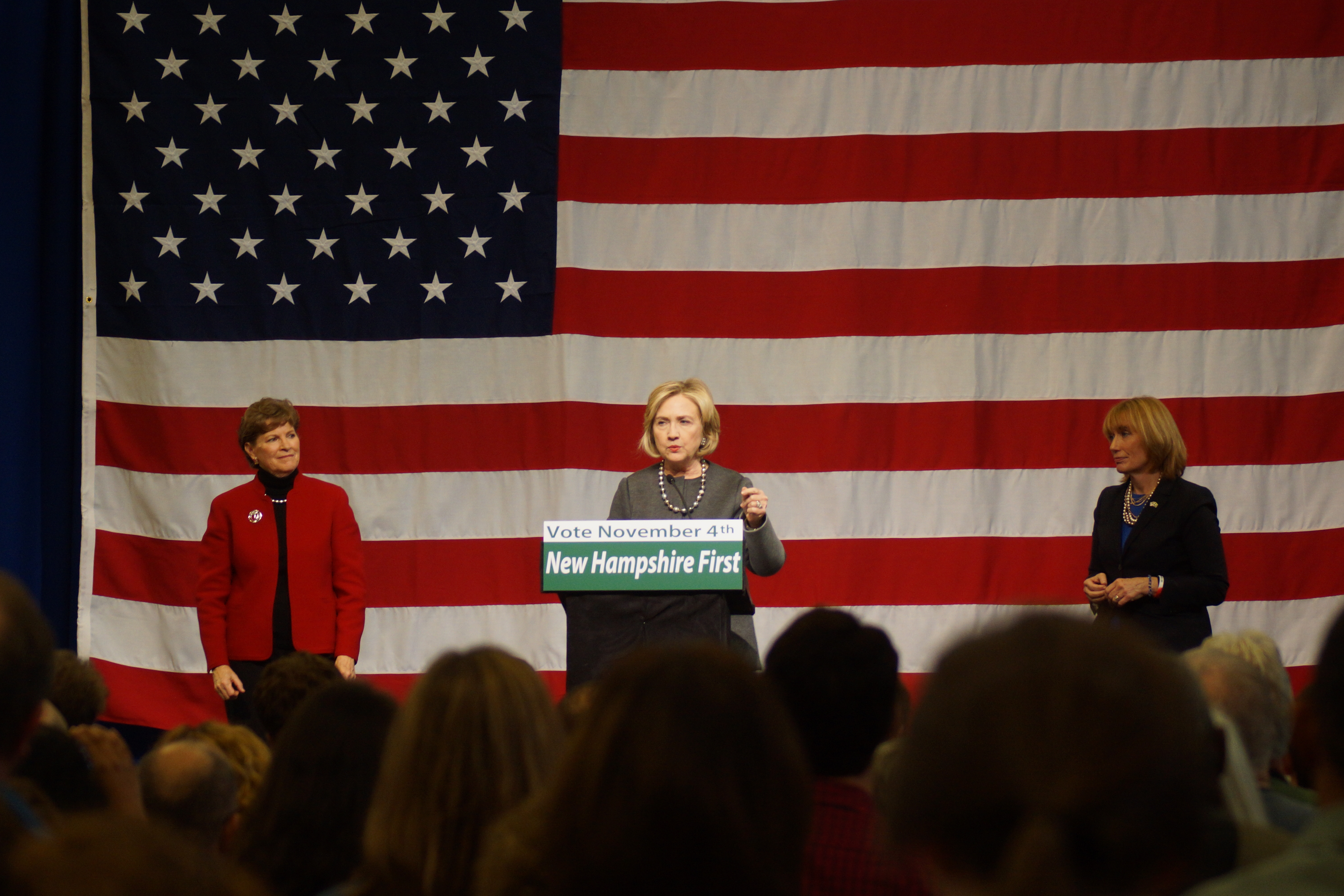
Shaheen, Hillary Clinton and Maggie Hassan in November 2014

Shaheen ran for reelection in 2014, facing former Massachusetts Senator Scott Brown.

In March 2014, Brown announced he was forming an exploratory committee to run against Shaheen. According to the Boston Herald, "Granite State Republicans are calling U.S. Sen. Jeanne Shaheen a hypocrite for asking potential GOP challenger and former U.S. Sen. Scott Brown to keep "outside" money out of the campaign while she fills the Democratic war chest on the West Coast".

In June 2014, WMUR reported that Shaheen had never released her tax returns in her 18 years of public service in New Hampshire. Shaheen said she would not rule out releasing her returns, but would like to see her opponent do so first.

She was endorsed again by Emily's List.

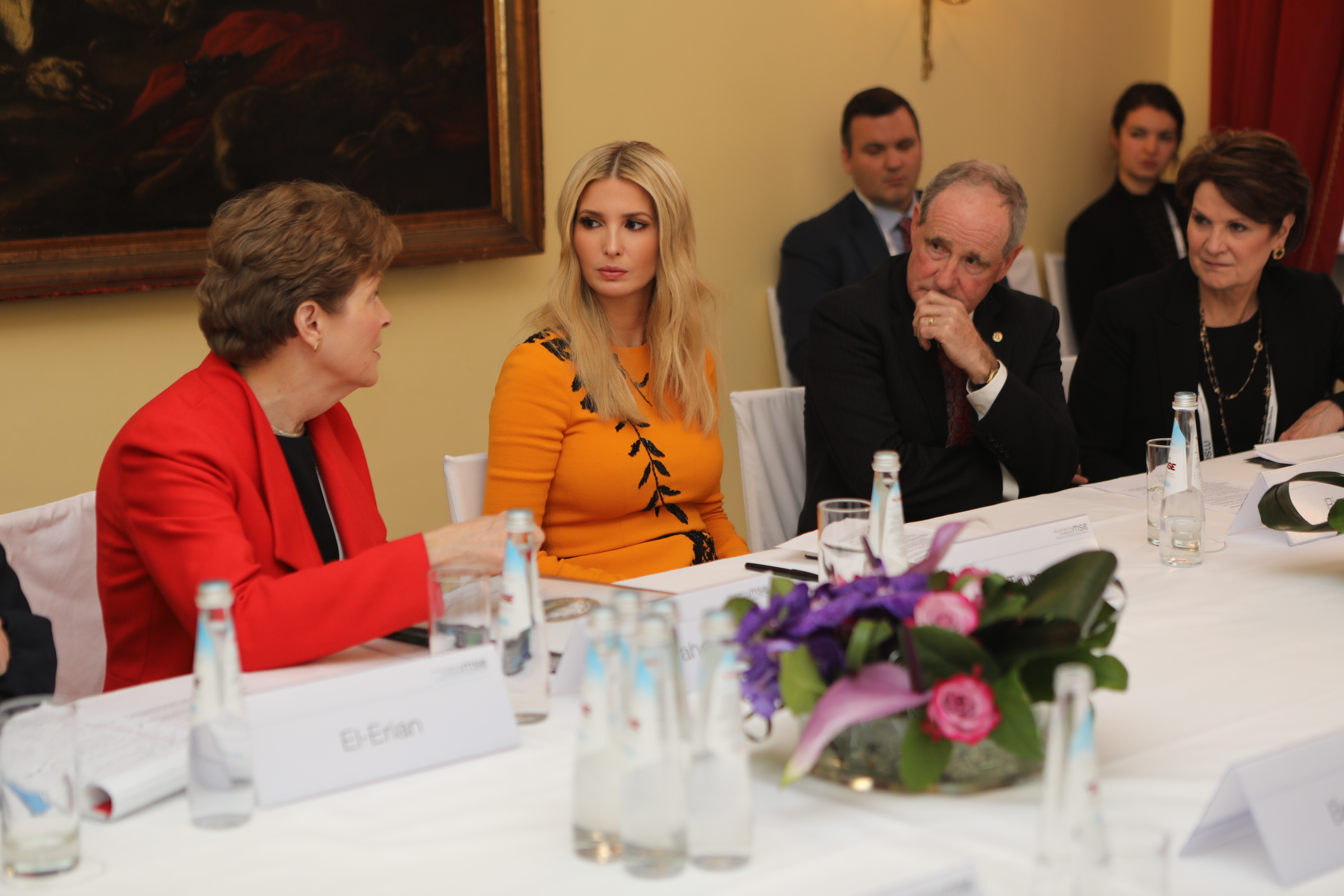
Shaheen, Ivanka Trump and Jim Risch in February 2019

On election night, even as her party lost control of the Senate, Shaheen won reelection by 15,837 votes. As a measure of how Republican New Hampshire once was, Shaheen is only the second Democrat in the state's history to win two terms in the Senate.

==== 2020 ====
Shaheen was reelected in 2020 defeating Republican nominee Bryant "Corky" Messner by 124,549 votes. She is the first New Hampshire Democrat elected to three full terms in the Senate. The only other Democrat to be popularly elected more than once from New Hampshire, Thomas J. McIntyre (who held the seat Shaheen currently holds), served the remainder of Styles Bridges's last term before being elected to two terms in his own right.

=== Tenure ===
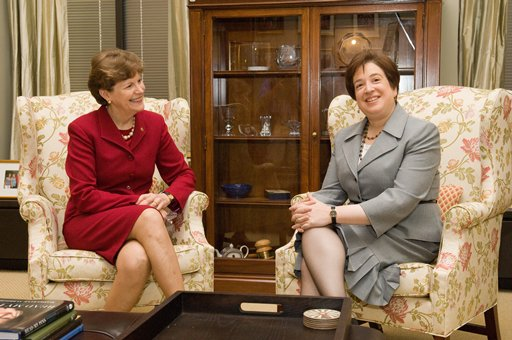
Senator Shaheen with Supreme Court Justice Elena Kagan, 2010

On January 3, 2009, Shaheen was sworn in to the United States Senate. As a senator, she has sponsored 288 bills, five of which have become law.

On January 6, 2021, Shaheen was participating in the certification of the 2021 United States Electoral College vote count when Trump supporters attacked the U.S. Capitol. She tweeted during the attack that she and her staff were safe and that "We will not be stopped from doing our Constitutional duty". The day after the attack, Shaheen called Trump "unfit for office" and said that she supported impeaching him and removing him from office.

In 2024, Shaheen was ranked among the top 10 most bipartisan senators.

On March 12, 2025, Shaheen announced in a press release that she would not seek reelection in 2026, writing: "I ran for public office to make a difference for the people of New Hampshire. That purpose has never, and will never, change. But today, after careful consideration, I'm announcing that I made the difficult decision not to seek reelection to the Senate in 2026. It's just time." The announcement marked the beginning of a competitive race to fill the seat Shaheen has held since 2009. Congressman Chris Pappas announced he was considering a run for the seat, as was Congresswoman Maggie Goodlander. Former Democratic Congresswoman Annie Kuster indicated she was exploring a possible run, but only if Pappas did not. Pappas ran and defeated Karishma Manzur in the Democratic primary in September 2026.

=== Committee assignments ===
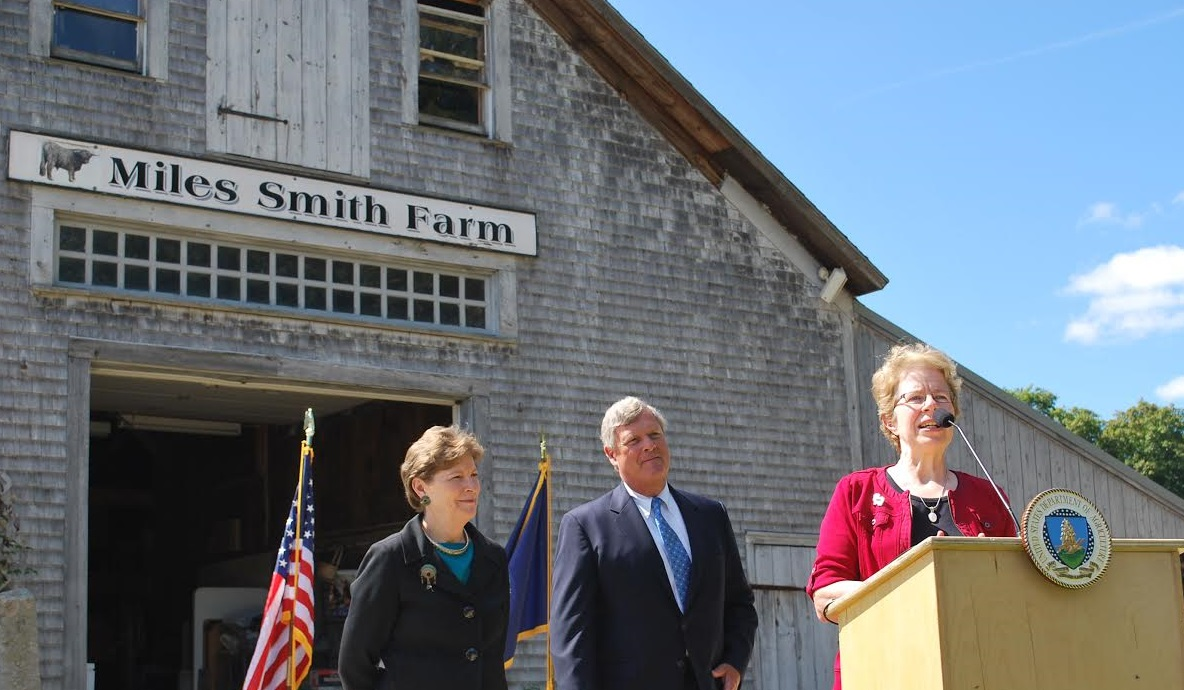
Jeanne Shaheen with U.S. Agriculture Secretary Tom Vilsack and New Hampshire Agriculture Commissioner Lorraine Merrill announcing a farm grant, 2014

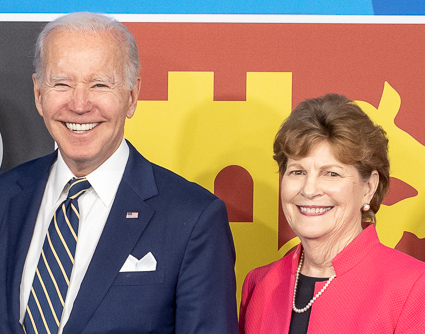
Shaheen and President Joe Biden at the 2022 NATO summit, June 2022

- Committee on Appropriations
  - Subcommittee on Commerce, Justice, Science, and Related Agencies (Chair)
  - Subcommittee on Defense
  - Subcommittee on Energy and Water Development
  - Subcommittee on Homeland Security
  - Subcommittee on Labor, Health and Human Services, Education, and Related Agencies
  - Subcommittee on the Department of State, Foreign Operations, and Related Programs
- Committee on Armed Services
  - Subcommittee on Emerging Threats and Capabilities
  - Subcommittee on Readiness and Management Support
  - Subcommittee on Seapower
- Committee on Foreign Relations
  - Subcommittee on European Affairs
  - Subcommittee on International Operations and Organizations, Human Rights, Democracy and Global Women's Issues
  - Subcommittee on Near Eastern and South and Central Asian Affairs
- Committee on Small Business (chair)
- Select Committee on Ethics
- Commission on Security and Cooperation in Europe

=== Caucus memberships ===
- Afterschool Caucuses
- Senate Taiwan Caucus
- Senate National Guard Caucus (co-chair)
- Rare Disease Caucus

== Political positions ==
=== Healthcare ===
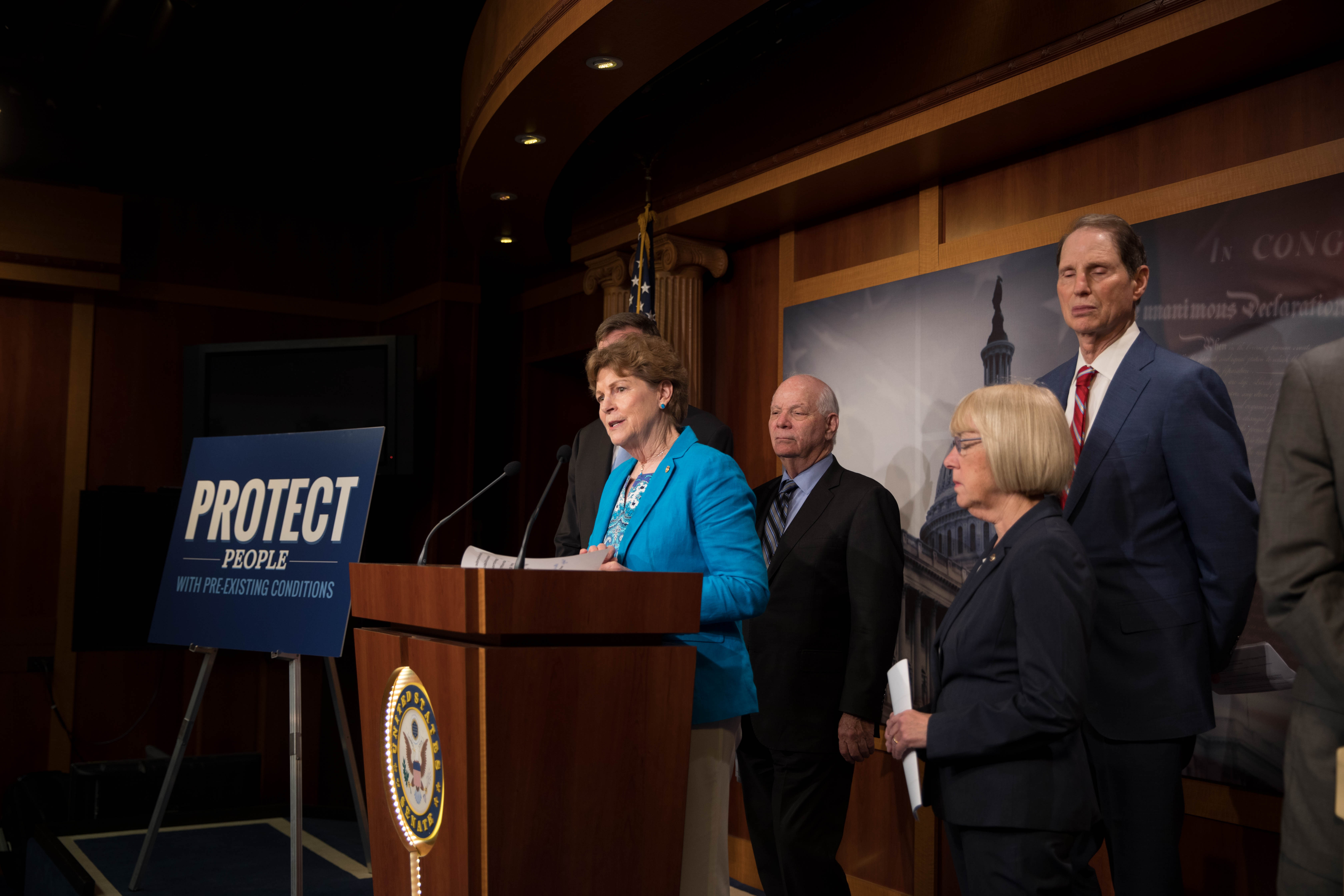
Shaheen speaks on health care, 2019

In 2009, Shaheen partnered with U.S. Senator Susan Collins to introduce the Medicare Transitional Care Act, which provides follow-up care for discharged hospital patients to reduce re-hospitalizations. The bill passed in 2010, and research at the University of Pennsylvania predicted the measure would lower the cost of healthcare by as much as $5,000 per Medicare beneficiary while also improving healthcare quality and reducing re-hospitalizations.

In December 2009, Shaheen voted for the Patient Protection and Affordable Care Act (Obamacare).

Before the rollout of the ACA, Shaheen said that people who liked their current healthcare plans could keep them. When asked about people who were losing their healthcare plans due to the ACA, Shaheen said they could keep their plans if they were "willing to pay more".

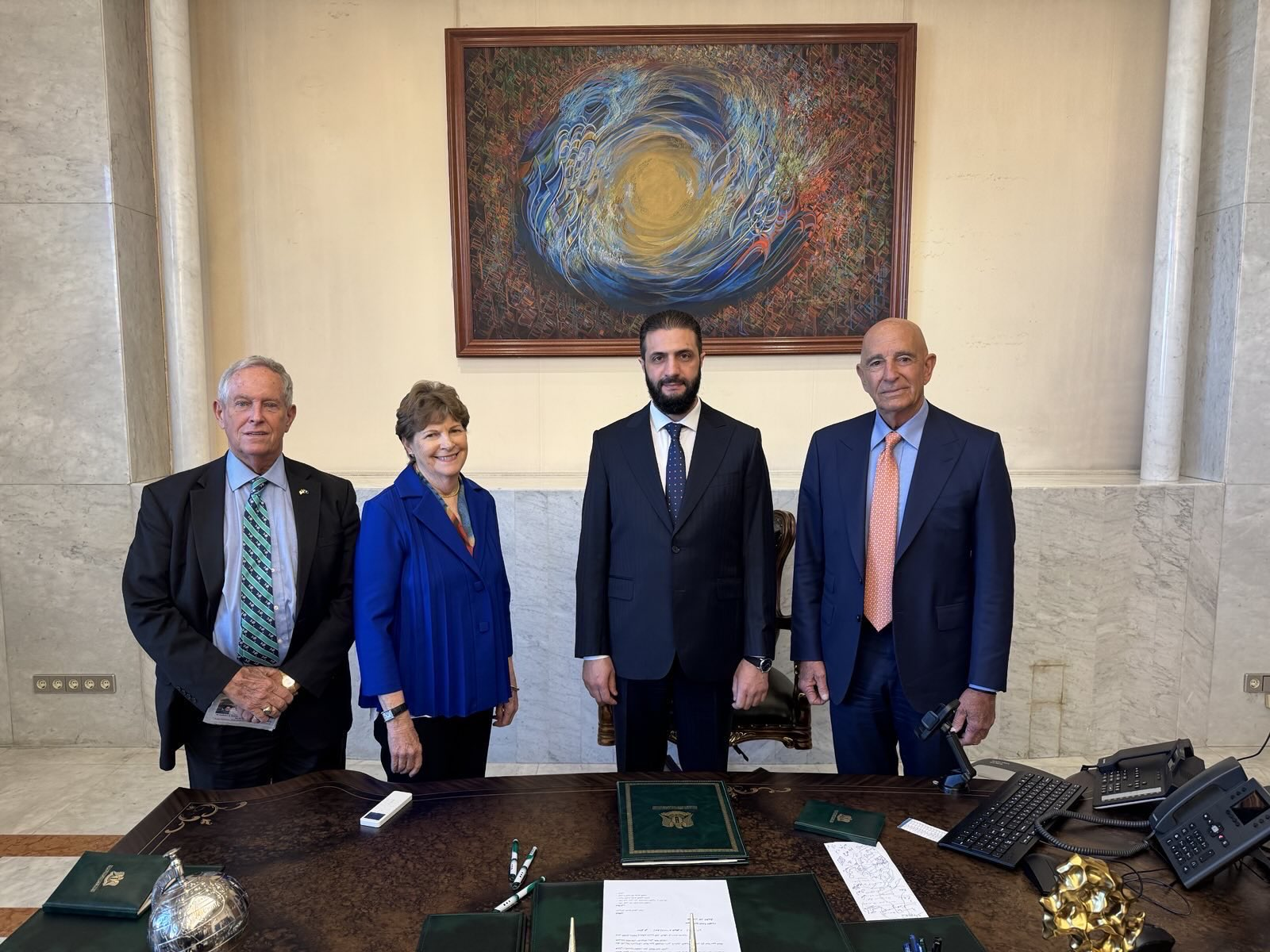
Shaheen, U.S. Congressman Joe Wilson, and U.S. envoy to Syria Tom Barrack met with Syrian President Ahmed al-Sharaa, August 2025

In August 2019, Shaheen was one of 19 senators to sign a letter to Treasury Secretary Steven Mnuchin and Health and Human Services Secretary Alex Azar requesting data from the Trump administration to help states and Congress understand the potential consequences of the Texas v. United States Affordable Care Act lawsuit, writing that an overhaul of the present health care system would form "an enormous hole in the pocketbooks of the people we serve as well as wreck state budgets".

In October 2019, Shaheen was one of 27 senators to sign a letter to Senate Majority Leader Mitch McConnell and Senate Minority Leader Chuck Schumer advocating the passage of the Community Health Investment, Modernization, and Excellence (CHIME) Act, which was set to expire the following month. The senators warned that if the funding for the Community Health Center Fund (CHCF) was allowed to expire, it "would cause an estimated 2,400 site closures, 47,000 lost jobs, and threaten the health care of approximately 9 million Americans."

=== Fiscal policy ===
On October 11, 2011, Shaheen voted to proceed with a proposed bill that included $446 billion in spending on infrastructure and schools and provided funding for state and local governments, as well as an extension of the payroll tax deduction. The spending would have been paid for by a 5.6% surtax on incomes above $1 million. The bill failed to obtain cloture.

Shaheen used an earmark in a large appropriations bill to restore funding for a federal prison in Berlin, NH, despite a $276 million recommended cut.

=== Gun policy ===
Shaheen supports making it illegal for individuals on the terrorist watchlist to buy guns and voted in favor of a bill proposing to expand background checks for gun purchases. She also voted to ban magazines of over 10 bullets. In 2016, she participated in the Chris Murphy gun control filibuster in the wake of the Orlando nightclub shooting. Shaheen said that "moments of sympathy are not enough" and that common-sense gun laws must be enacted.

=== Energy ===
Following the BP oil spill in the Gulf of Mexico in 2010, Shaheen proposed abolishing the Minerals Management Service, the U.S. government agency tasked with regulating offshore drilling, arguing that reform had been insufficient and that a new agency was needed. Shaheen also proposed legislation giving the president's bipartisan BP Oil Spill Commission subpoena power in its investigation. She argued that subpoena power was necessary to avoid another such disaster, emphasizing the spill's economic costs to the Gulf Coast region and the economy as a whole.

On April 28, 2014, Shaheen introduced the Energy Savings and Industrial Competitiveness Act of 2014 (S. 2262; 113th Congress), a bill intended to improve efficient energy use.

In March 2019 Shaheen was an original cosponsor of a bipartisan bill intended to mandate that the Environmental Protection Agency declare per- and polyfluoroalkyl substances as hazardous substances that can be addressed with cleanup funds via the EPA Superfund law and require that polluters undertake or pay for remediation within a year of the bill's enaction.

Shaheen opposed Nord Stream 2, a pipeline for delivering natural gas from Russia to Germany.

=== Iraq War ===
In 2002, when Shaheen narrowly lost to Sununu, she supported both the 2003 invasion of Iraq and "regime change" for Iraq. Shaheen said that she came to supporting the policy of removing Saddam Hussein from power after meeting with former Clinton-administration National Security Advisor Sandy Berger. According to the Concord Monitor and Associated Press, the issue was a minor one in the race.

Shaheen later questioned George W. Bush's handling of the situation in Iraq. In a September 2004 televised interview as Kerry presidential campaign chair she said:

George [W.] Bush has taken us in the wrong direction. He misled us into war in Iraq. That war has not made us safer and more secure at home ... You know, we have not stabilized Afghanistan. We have not stabilized Iraq. There is no plan to win the peace.

On July 28, 2004, while serving as Chair of the Kerry-Edwards Campaign, Shaheen answered questions about her prior support of the Iraq war during an interview on C-SPAN.

George [W.] Bush said that the reason we needed to go to war in Iraq, the reason we needed to remove Saddam Hussein, was because he had weapons of mass destruction, weapons that could be used against this country, because he had ties to al-Qaeda and the terrorists who were responsible for the September 11 tragedy. What we know now and what George Bush and Dick Cheney have admitted is that in fact Saddam Hussein did not have weapons of mass destruction. (...) The links to al-Qaeda that the president talked about were not there. (...) While I appreciate that there was an effort to make people in this country think that [there was a connection] (...) the fact is that's not true.

=== War in Afghanistan ===
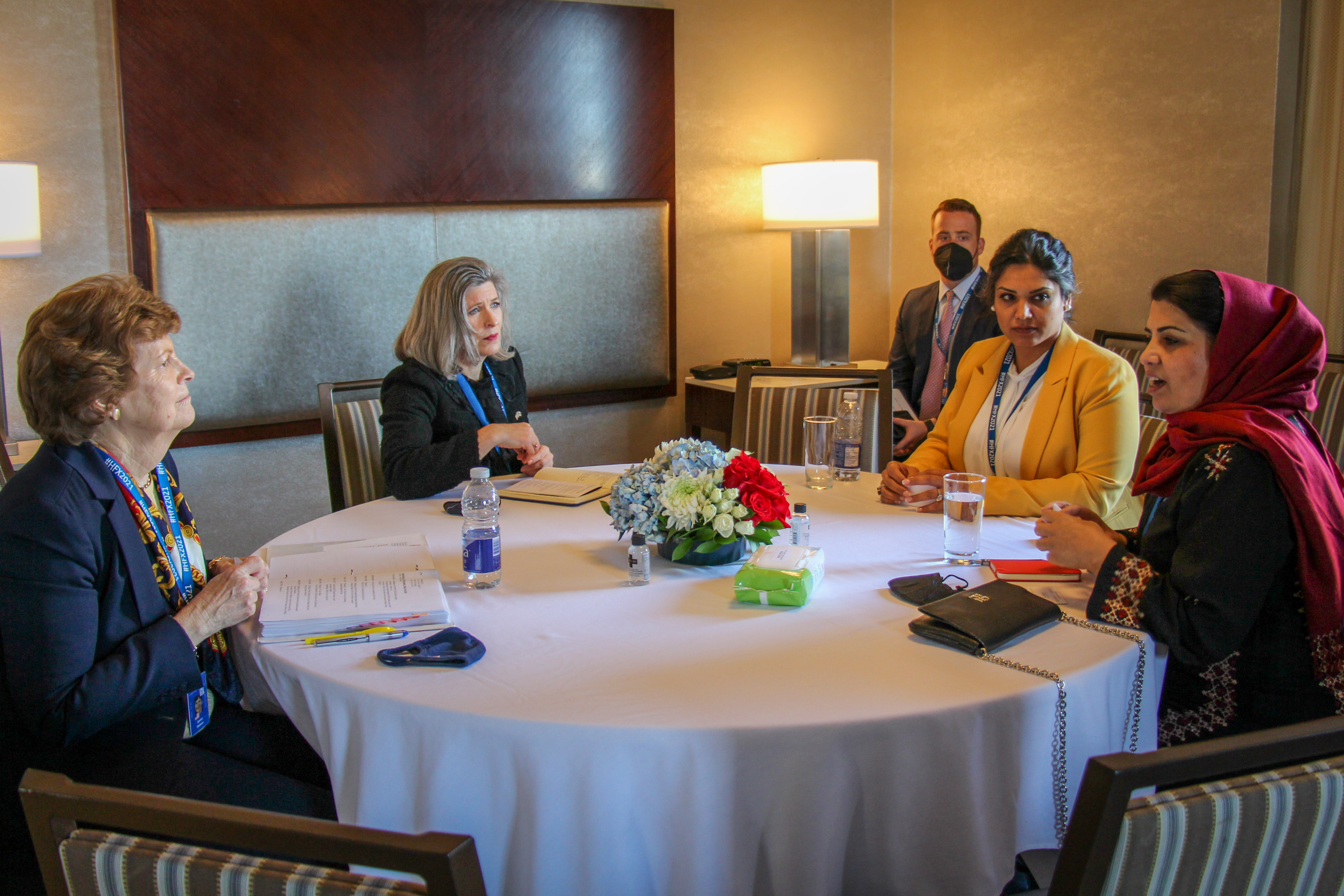
Shaheen and Senator Joni Ernst in a meeting with Afghan women, 2021

Shaheen opposed the 2021 withdrawal of U.S. troops from Afghanistan under President Joe Biden.

=== LGBT rights ===
Shaheen initially opposed same-sex marriage as Governor of New Hampshire, but in 2009 she came out in favor of marriage for same-sex couples and sponsored the Respect for Marriage Act. She also voted in favor of the repeal of Don't ask, don't tell, and supports government recognition of same-sex spouses of military and other government personnel.

=== Minimum wage ===
On March 5, 2021, Shaheen voted against Bernie Sanders's amendment to include a $15/hour minimum wage in the American Rescue Plan Act of 2021.

=== Immigration ===
In 2025, Shaheen was one of 12 Senate Democrats who joined all Republicans to vote for the Laken Riley Act.

=== Sudanese civil war ===
In October 2025, after the Rapid Support Forces (RSF) captured El Fasher in Sudan, Shaheen denounced the RSF massacre of local civilians, urged that the RSF be designated a terrorist organization, and harshly criticized the United Arab Emirates for its support of the RSF.

=== Foreign policy ===
In September 2026, Shaheen placed a hold on a $2.8 billion weapons sale to Israel that included 40,000 one-ton bombs. She cited Prime Minister Benjamin Netanyahu's failure to address concerns over civilian deaths in Gaza, Israeli strikes in Syria, and settler violence against Palestinians in the West Bank.

== Personal life ==
Shaheen is married to William Shaheen, an attorney and judge. They have three children together. Their daughter Stefany is the member-elect for New Hampshire's 1st congressional district in the United States House of Representatives. Stefany publicly opposed her mother's position on the 2025 federal government shutdown.

Jeanne and William Shaheen formerly owned a store in New Hampshire that sold used jewelry. In June 2025, the Department of Homeland Security (DHS) published a press release alleging that Senator Shaheen intervened to remove her husband from enhanced Transportation Security Administration (TSA) scrutiny. After she contacted TSA, he was reportedly removed from the list and exempted from enhanced screening. DHS characterized this as evidence of politicization in the Biden administration's watchlisting process and accused the program of being used to benefit political allies.

== Electoral history ==
Governor elections in New Hampshire: Results 1996–2000

Year	Democratic	Votes	Pct	Republican	Votes	Pct	3rd Party	Party	Votes	Pct	3rd Party	Party	Votes	Pct
1996	Jeanne Shaheen	284,175	57%	Ovide Lamontagne	196,321	40%	Fred Bramante	Independent Reform	10,316	2%	Robert Kingsbury	Libertarian	5,974	1%
1998	Jeanne Shaheen (inc.)	210,769	66%	Jay Lucas	98,473	31%	Ken Blevens	Libertarian	8,655	3%	Write-ins	Write-ins	503	<1%
2000	Jeanne Shaheen (inc.)	275,038	49%	Gordon Humphrey	246,952	44%	Mary Brown	Independent	35,904	6%	John Babiarz	Libertarian	6,446	1%

U.S. Senate (Class II) elections in New Hampshire: Results 2002–2020
Year	Democratic	Votes	Pct	Republican	Votes	Pct	3rd Party	Party	Votes	Pct	3rd Party	Party	Votes	Pct	
2002	Jeanne Shaheen	207,478	46%	John E. Sununu	227,229	51%	Ken Blevens	Libertarian	9,835	2%	Bob Smith	Write-in	2,396	1%	*
2008	Jeanne Shaheen	358,947	52%	John E. Sununu (inc.)	314,412	45%	Ken Blevens	Libertarian	21,381	3%					
2014	Jeanne Shaheen (inc.)	251,184	51%	Scott Brown	235,347	48%									
2020	Jeanne Shaheen (inc.)	450,771	57%	Corky Messner	326,229	41%	Justin O'Donnell	Libertarian	18,421	2%					

*Write-in and minor candidate notes: In 2002, write-ins received 197 votes.

Primaries

New Hampshire Governor Democratic primary election, 1996
Party	Candidate	Votes	%
Democratic	Jeanne Shaheen	52,238	88%
Democratic	Lovett	4,286	7%
Democratic	Woodworth	2,609	4%

New Hampshire Governor Democratic primary election, 2000
Party	Candidate	Votes	%
Democratic	Jeanne Shaheen (inc.)	45,249	60%
Democratic	Mark Fernald	28,488	38%

U.S. Senate Democratic primary election in New Hampshire, 2008
Party	Candidate	Votes	%
Democratic	Jeanne Shaheen	43,968	89%
Democratic	Raymond Stebbins	5,281	11%

== See also ==
- List of female governors in the United States
- Women in the United States Senate

Party political offices
Preceded by Wayne King	Democratic nominee for Governor of New Hampshire; 1996, 1998, 2000	Succeeded by Mark Fernald
Preceded by Dick Swett	Democratic nominee for U.S. Senator from New Hampshire (Class 2); 2002, 2008, 2014, 2020	Succeeded by Chris Pappas
Political offices
Preceded by Steve Merrill	Governor of New Hampshire; 1997–2003	Succeeded by Craig Benson
U.S. Senate
Preceded by John Sununu	U.S. Senator (Class 2) from New Hampshire; 2009–present Served alongside: Judd Gregg, Kelly Ayotte, Maggie Hassan	Incumbent
Preceded by Ben Cardin	Ranking Member of the Senate Small Business Committee; 2015–2018	Succeeded by Ben Cardin
Preceded by Ben Cardin	Chair of the Senate Small Business Committee; 2023–2025	Succeeded by Joni Ernst
Preceded by Jim Risch	Ranking Member of the Senate Foreign Relations Committee; 2025–present	Incumbent
U.S. order of precedence (ceremonial)
Preceded by Roger Wicker	Order of precedence of the United States as United States Senator	Succeeded by Mark Warner
Preceded by Roger Wicker	United States senators by seniority 19th	Succeeded by Mark Warner
