= 2002 United States Senate election in New Hampshire =

- November 5, 2002
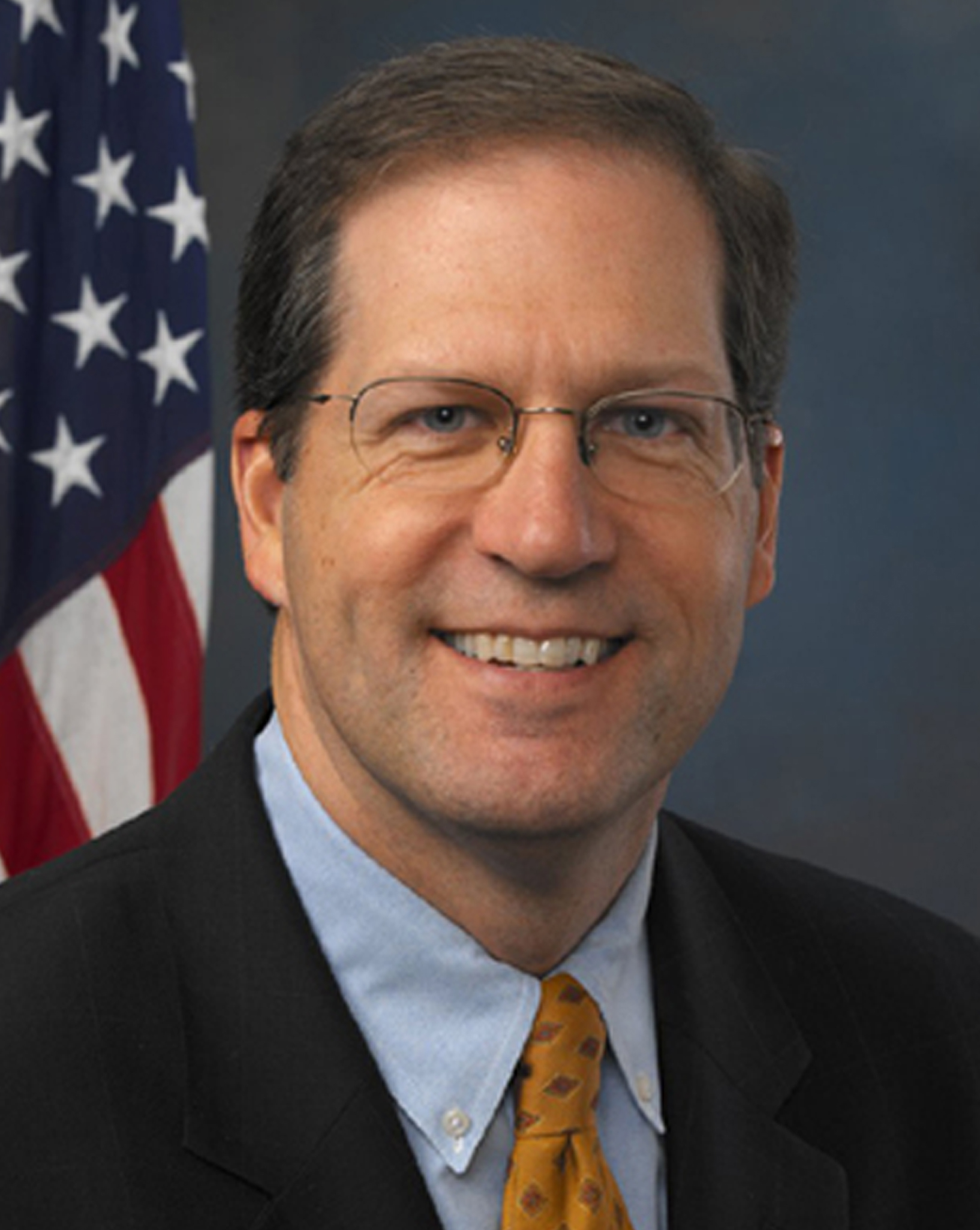

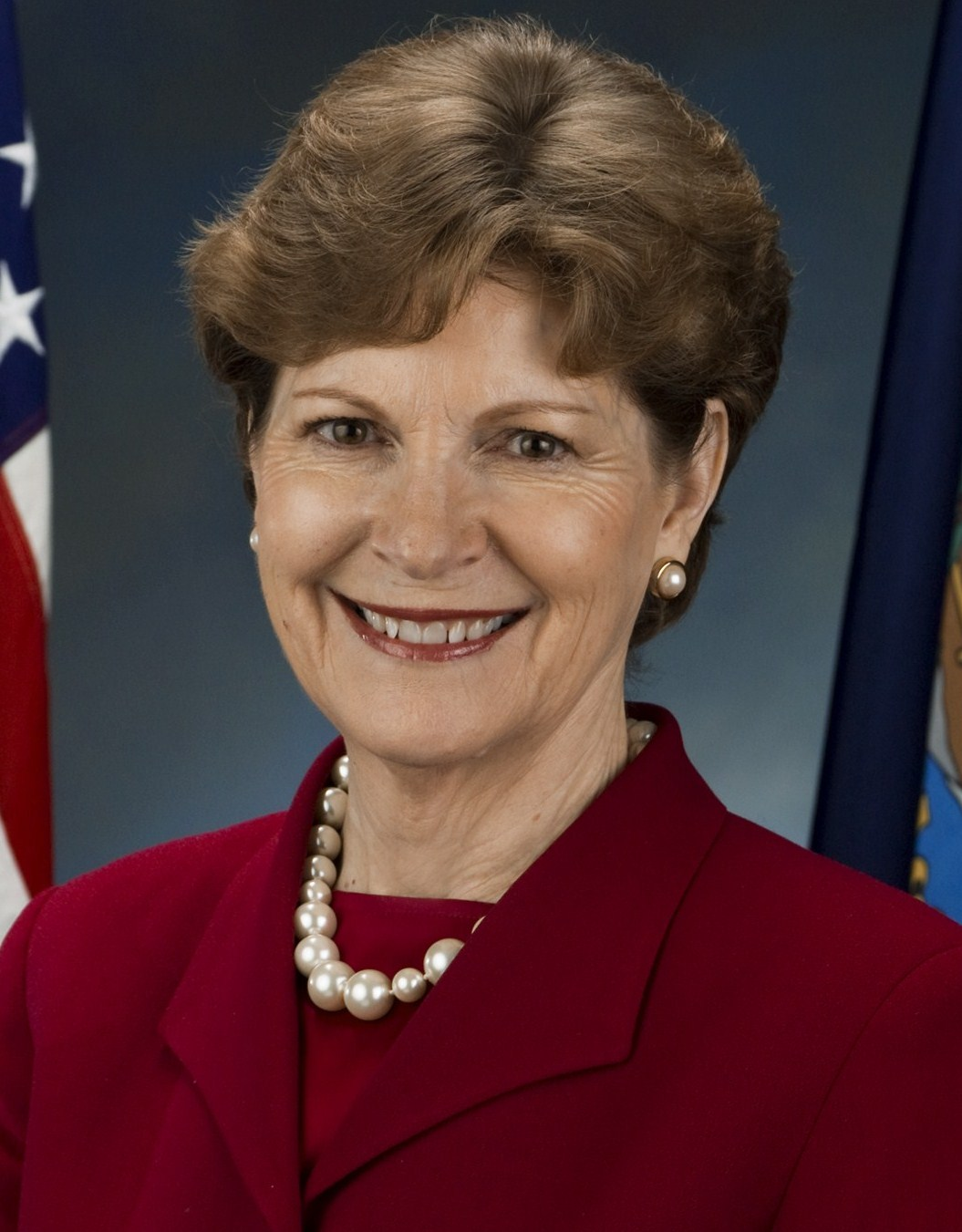
Nominee	John E. Sununu	Jeanne Shaheen
Party	Republican	Democratic
Popular vote	227,229	207,478
Percentage	51.12%	46.67%
- Sununu: 40–50% 50–60% 60–70% 70–80% >90% Shaheen: 40–50% 50–60% 60–70% 70–80% >90% Tie: 40–50%
U.S. senator before election
Bob Smith
Republican
Elected U.S. Senator
John E. Sununu
Republican

The 2002 United States Senate election in New Hampshire was held on November 5, 2002. Incumbent Republican U.S. Senator Bob Smith was defeated in the primary by U.S. Representative John E. Sununu. Sununu won the open seat, defeating Democratic Governor Jeanne Shaheen. As of 2025, this was the last time Republicans won the Class 2 Senate seat in New Hampshire; Shaheen defeated Sununu in their 2008 rematch for this seat and has held it since 2009. This was Shaheen’s only unsuccessful run for elected office. Smith later ran for this seat again in 2014 and lost the Republican primary.

== Republican primary ==
=== Campaign ===
Senator Bob Smith, the incumbent Republican Senator, briefly left the party in 1999 to run for president as an independent, claiming that the Republican platform was "not worth the paper it's written on". He rejoined the GOP a few months later, saying he made a mistake. Nonetheless, the party never fully forgave him, and some of his fellow Republican Senators went so far as to endorse his primary opponent, Rep. John Sununu, who would go on to win by more than eight percentage points.

=== Polling ===
Poll source	Date(s) administered	Sample size (Note: Key: A – all adults RV – registered voters LV – likely voters V – unclear)	Margin of error	Bob Smith	John Sununu	Other	Undecided
University of New Hampshire/WMUR	August 26 – September 3, 2002	335 (LV)	± 5.0%	34%	56%	1% (Note: Ken Stremsky with 1%)	9%
University of New Hampshire	June 23 – July 1, 2002	230 (LV)	± 6.0%	40%	52%	3% (Note: "Other/Neither" with 2%; Ken Stremsky with 1%)	9%
American Research Group	June 21–25, 2002	600 (LV)	± 4.0%	41%	48%	–	11%
American Research Group	June 3–5, 2002	600 (LV)	± 4.0%	38%	55%	–	7%
American Research Group	April 30 – May 2, 2002	600 (LV)	± 4.0%	29%	56%	–	15%
University of New Hampshire/WMUR	April 10–14 2002	237 (LV)	± 6.4%	30%	59%	2%	10%
American Research Group	April 2002	600 (LV)	± 4.0%	33%	51%	–	16%
American Research Group	February 6–10, 2002	600 (LV)	± 4.0%	34%	44%	–	22%
University of New Hampshire	January 25 – February 5, 2002	230 (LV)	± 6.5%	37%	51%	4%	8%
American Research Group	January 5, 2002	600 (LV)	± 4.0%	27%	51%	–	22%
American Research Group	November 16–20 2001	600 (LV)	± 4.0%	47%	39%	–	14%
University of New Hampshire	October 19–29, 2001	202 (LV)	± 6.7%	35%	53%	4%	8%
American Research Group	October 16–18, 2001	600 (LV)	± 4.0%	47%	41%	–	12%

Results by county: Sununu: 50–60%; Smith: 50–60%

=== Results ===
Republican primary results
Party	Candidate	Votes	%
Republican	John Sununu	81,920	53.35%
Republican	Bob Smith (incumbent)	68,608	44.68%
Total votes		150,528	100.00%

== General election ==
=== Candidates ===
- Ken Blevens (Libertarian)
- Jeanne Shaheen, Governor of New Hampshire (Democratic)
- John E. Sununu, U.S. Representative (Republican)

=== Campaign ===
During the campaign, there was a major scandal that involved the use of a telemarketing firm hired by that state's Republican Party (NHGOP) for election tampering. The GOP Marketplace, based in Northern Virginia, jammed another phone bank being used by the state Democratic Party and the firefighters' union for efforts to turn out voters on behalf of then-governor Jeanne Shaheen on Election Day. The tampering involved using a call center to jam the phone lines of a Get Out the Vote (GOTV) operation. In the end, 900 calls were made for 45 minutes of disruption to the Democratic-leaning call centers. In addition to criminal prosecutions, disclosures in the case have come from a civil suit filed by the state's Democratic Party against the state's Republican Party (now settled). Four men have been convicted of, or pleaded guilty to, federal crimes and sentenced to prison for their involvement as of 2008. One conviction has been reversed by an appeals court, a decision prosecutors are appealing. James Tobin, freed on appeal, was later indicted on charges of lying to the FBI during the original investigation.

=== Predictions ===
Source	Ranking	As of
Sabato's Crystal Ball	Lean D (flip)	November 4, 2002

=== Polling ===
Poll source	Date(s) administered	Sample size	Margin of error	John Sununu (R)	Jeanne Shaheen (D)	Other	Undecided
American Research Group	November 2–3, 2002	600 (LV)	± 4.0%	48%	44%	–	8%
UNH/CNN/USA Today	October 30 – November 2, 2002	644 (LV)	± 3.8%	46%	45%	6% (Note: Ken Blevens (L) with 4%; "Other" with 2%)	2%
UNH/CNN/USA Today	October 30 – November 2, 2002	644 (LV)	± 3.8%	47% (Note: With undecided voters allocated)	46%	6%	–
Concord Monitor	October 29–31, 2002	–	–	46%	47%	–	7%
American Research Group	October 28–30, 2002	600 (LV)	± 4.0%	48%	46%	–	6%
Franklin Pierce College/WNDS-TV	October 27–30, 2002	926 (RV)	± 3.0%	40%	45%	4% (Note: Ken Blevens (L) and "Other" with 2%)	10%
University of New Hampshire/WMUR	October 23–29, 2002	648 (LV)	± 3.8%	42%	46%	4%	7%
American Research Group	October 20–22, 2002	600 (LV)	± 4.0%	48%	46%	–	6%
American Research Group	October 16, 2002	600 (LV)	± 4.0%	51%	43%	–	6%
University of New Hampshire/WMUR	October 3–10, 2002	651 (LV)	± 4.0%	44%	47%	4% (Note: Ken Blevens (L) with 1%; "Other" with 3%)	5%
American Research Group	October 2, 2002	600 (LV)	± 4.0%	55%	34%	–	11%
GQR (D)	September 18–19, 2002	–	–	46%	43%	–	11%
American Research Group	September 14–18, 2002	600 (LV)	± 4.0%	47%	38%	–	15%
University of New Hampshire	June 23 – July 1, 2002	529 (LV)	± 4.0%	51%	42%	3%	4%
American Research Group	June 2002	600 (LV)	± 4.0%	37%	33%	–	30%
University of New Hampshire	April 10–14, 2002	526 (LV)	± 4.3%	50%	42%	2%	6%
American Research Group	March 2002	600 (LV)	± 4.0%	40%	36%	–	24%
University of New Hampshire	January 25 – February 5, 2002	554 (RV)	± 4.1%	49%	42%	4%	6%
American Research Group	December 2001	600 (LV)	± 4.0%	39%	29%	–	32%
University of New Hampshire	October 19–29, 2001	505 (RV)	± 4.4%	50%	38%	3%	9%
American Research Group	September 2001	600 (LV)	± 4.0%	47%	39%	–	14%
American Research Group	July 2001	600 (LV)	± 4.0%	49%	35%	–	16%
American Research Group	June 2001	600 (LV)	± 4.0%	50%	35%	–	15%

Hypothetical polling

Bob Smith vs. Jeanne Shaheen

Poll source	Date(s) administered	Sample size	Margin of error	Bob Smith (R)	Jeanne Shaheen (D)	Other	Undecided
University of New Hampshire	June 23 – July 1, 2002	529 (LV)	± 4.0%	45%	47%	3%	4%
University of New Hampshire	April 10–14 2002	526 (LV)	± 4.3%	42%	49%	5%	4%
University of New Hampshire	January 25 – February 5, 2002	558 (RV)	± 4.1%	43%	46%	4%	6%
University of New Hampshire	October 19–29, 2001	505 (RV)	± 4.4%	44%	45%	5%	6%

=== Results ===
General election results
Party	Candidate	Votes	%	±%
Republican	John Sununu	227,229	51.12%	+1.87
Democratic	Jeanne Shaheen	207,478	46.67%	+0.45%
Libertarian	Ken Blevens	9,835	2.21%	−2.32%
Majority		19,751	4.44%	+1.41%
Total votes		444,542	100.0%	
Republican hold				

==== Results by county ====
County	John E. Sununu Republican		Jeanne Shaheen Democratic		Various candidates		Margin		Total votes cast
County	#	%	#	%	#	%	#	%	Total votes cast
Belknap	12,658	57.7%	8,765	39.9%	519	2.4%	3,893	17.8%	21,942
Carroll	10,650	55.2%	8,134	42.2%	503	2.5%	2,516	13.0%	19,287
Cheshire	10,737	41.5%	14,200	54.9%	918	3.6%	-3,463	-13.4%	25,855
Coös	5,055	44.6%	5,957	52.6%	316	2.8%	-902	-8.0%	11,328
Grafton	14,081	46.7%	15,266	50.7%	773	2.6%	-1,185	-4.0%	30,120
Hillsborough	68,320	53.0%	57,354	44.5%	3,298	2.5%	10,966	8.5%	128,972
Merrimack	25,263	47.2%	26,898	50.3%	1,366	2.5%	-1,635	-3.1%	53,527
Rockingham	55,710	54.2%	43,968	42.8%	3,099	3.0%	11,742	3.16%	102,777
Strafford	17,418	45.0%	20,109	52.0%	1,149	3.0%	-2,691	-7.0%	38,676
Sullivan	7,337	50.1%	6,827	46.6%	487	3.3%	510	3.5%	14,651
Totals	227,229	50.8%	207,478	46.4%	12,428	2.8%	19,751	4.4%	447,135

Counties that flipped from Republican to Democratic

- Grafton (largest city: Lebanon)

== See also ==
- 2002 United States Senate election
