= 2002 United States House of Representatives elections in New Hampshire =

- November 5, 2002

All 2 New Hampshire seats to the United States House of Representatives
| | Majority party | Minority party |
|---|---|---|
| Party | Republican | Democratic |
| Last election | 2 | 0 |
| Seats won | 2 | 0 |
| Seat change | Steady | Steady |
| Popular vote | 254,797 | 175,905 |
| Percentage | 57.46% | 39.67% |
| Swing | ▲2.93% | ▼3.27% |
- Republican 50–60%

The 2002 congressional elections in New Hampshire were held on November 5, 2002, to determine who would represent the state of New Hampshire in the United States House of Representatives. It coincided with the state's senatorial elections. Representatives are elected for two-year terms; those elected served in the 108th Congress from January 2003 until January 2005. New Hampshire has two seats in the House, apportioned according to the 2000 United States census.

== Overview ==
United States House of Representatives elections in New Hampshire, 2002
| Party | Votes | Percentage | Seats | +/– |
|---|---|---|---|---|
| Republican | 254,797 | 57.46% | 2 | - |
| Democratic | 175,905 | 39.67% | 0 | - |
| Libertarian | 12,438 | 2.80% | 0 | - |
| Independents | 303 | 0.07% | 0 | - |
| Totals | 443,443 | 100.00% | 2 | - |

== District 1 ==
2002 New Hampshire's 1st congressional district election
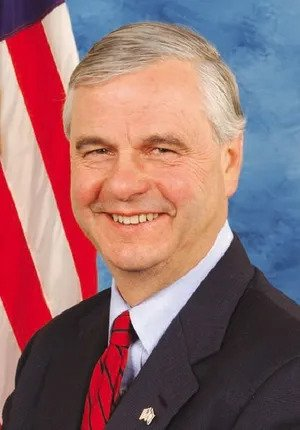

| Nominee | Jeb Bradley | Martha Fuller Clark |
| Party | Republican | Democratic |
| Popular vote | 128,993 | 85,426 |
| Percentage | 58.2% | 38.5% |
- County results Bradley: 50–60% 60–70%
U.S. Representative before election
John E. Sununu
Republican
Elected U.S. Representative
Jeb Bradley
Republican

=== Predictions ===
| Source | Ranking | As of |
|---|---|---|
| Sabato's Crystal Ball | Lean R | November 4, 2002 |
| New York Times | Tossup | October 14, 2002 |

Results

New Hampshire's 1st congressional district election, 2002
| Party | Candidate | Votes | % |
|---|---|---|---|
| Republican | Jeb Bradley | 128,993 | 58.16% |
| Democratic | Martha Fuller Clark | 85,426 | 38.51% |
| Libertarian | Dan Belforti | 7,387 | 3.33% |
| Total votes | | 221,806 | 100.00% |

== District 2 ==
2002 New Hampshire's 2nd congressional district election
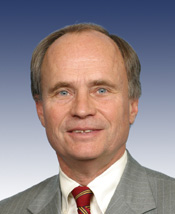

| Nominee | Charles Bass | Katrina Swett |
| Party | Republican | Democratic |
| Popular vote | 125,804 | 90,479 |
| Percentage | 56.8% | 40.9% |
- County results Bass: 50–60% 60–70%
U.S. Representative before election
Charles Bass
Republican
Elected U.S. Representative
Charles Bass
Republican

=== Predictions ===
| Source | Ranking | As of |
|---|---|---|
| Sabato's Crystal Ball | Safe R | November 4, 2002 |
| New York Times | Lean R | October 14, 2002 |

Results

New Hampshire's 2nd congressional district election, 2002
| Party | Candidate | Votes | % |
|---|---|---|---|
| Republican | Charles Bass | 125,804 | 56.84% |
| Democratic | Katrina Swett | 90,479 | 40.88% |
| Libertarian | Rosalie T. Babiarz | 5,051 | 2.28% |
| Total votes | | 221,334 | 100.00% |
