= Carlos Gutierrez =

American politician (born 1953)

Carlos Gutiérrez
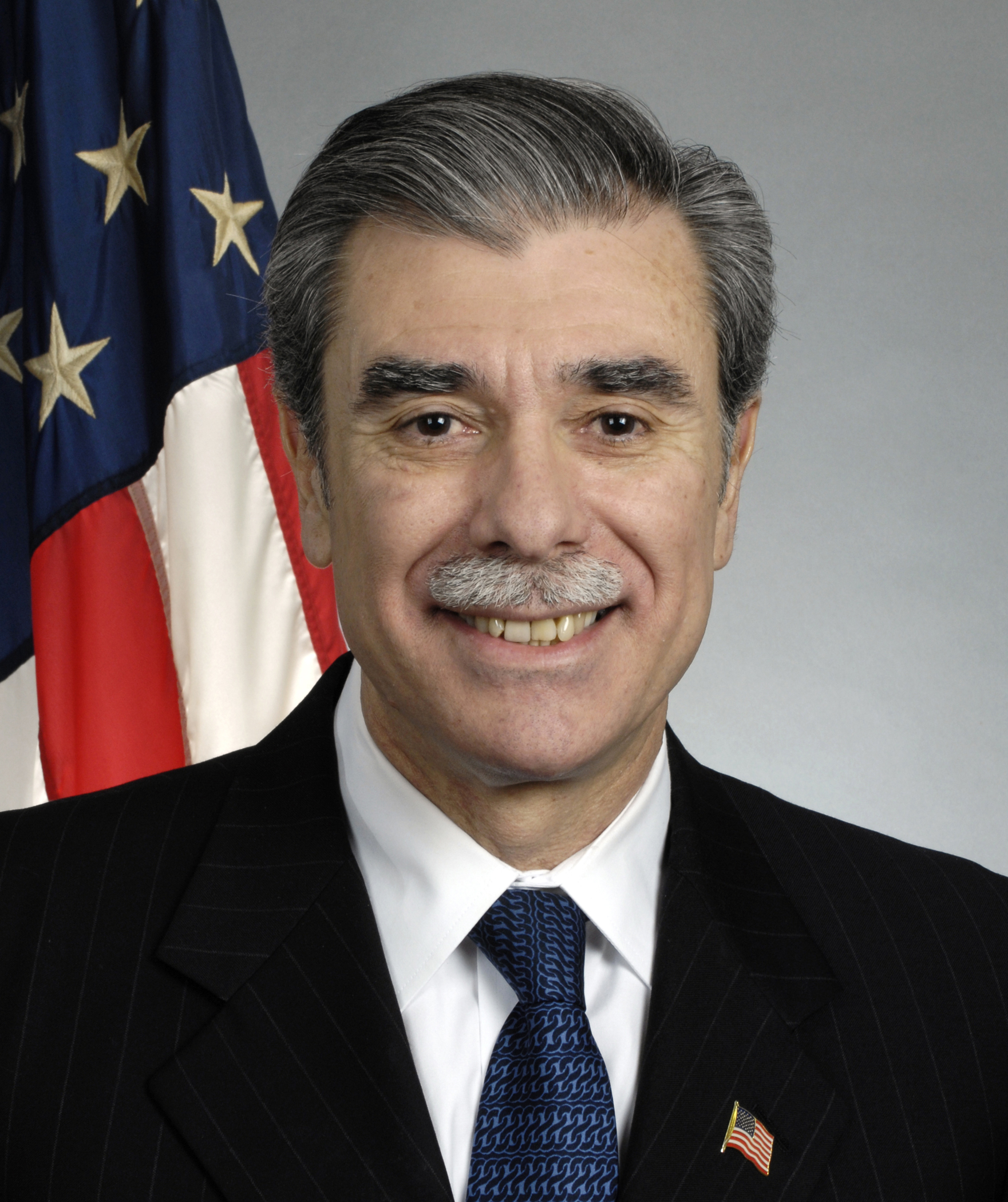
- Official portrait, 2008

35th United States Secretary of Commerce
- In office February 7, 2005 – January 20, 2009
- President: George W. Bush
- Preceded by: Donald Evans
- Succeeded by: Gary Locke

Personal details
- Born: Carlos Miguel Gutiérrez; November 4, 1953 (age 72) Havana, Cuba
- Party: Republican
- Spouse: Edilia Gutierrez
- Children: 3
- Education: Monterrey Institute of Technology and Higher Education, Querétaro (attended)

Carlos Miguel Gutierrez (originally Gutiérrez; born November 4, 1953) is an American former CEO and former United States Secretary of Commerce. He is currently a co-founder and executive chairman of EmPath. Gutierrez is a former chairman of the board and CEO of the Kellogg Company. He served as the 35th U.S. Secretary of Commerce from 2005 to 2009.

== Early life and education ==
Gutierrez is of Spanish descent. He was born in Havana, Cuba, the son of a pineapple plantation owner. As a successful businessman, his father was deemed an enemy of the state by Fidel Castro's regime. Faced with the expropriation of their property following the Cuban Revolution, Gutierrez's family fled for the United States in 1960, when he was six years old, settling in Miami.

When it became apparent they would not be returning to Cuba, Gutierrez's father accepted a position with the H. J. Heinz Company in Mexico and later started his own business. Gutierrez learned his first words of English from the bellhop at the hotel where they initially stayed and, some years later, he and his family acquired United States citizenship.

Gutierrez studied business administration at the Monterrey Institute of Technology and Higher Education campus in Querétaro but never received a degree, making him the most recent U.S. Cabinet member without a college degree.

== Kellogg Company ==
Gutierrez joined Kellogg's in Mexico in 1975, at the age of 22, as a sales representative and management trainee. One of his early assignments was driving a delivery-truck route around local stores.

Gutierrez rose through the management ranks. In January 1990 he was promoted to corporate vice president of product development at the company's headquarters in Battle Creek, Michigan, and in July of that year, he became executive vice president of Kellogg USA. In January 1999, he was elected to the company's board of directors. In April he was appointed president and CEO, succeeding Arnold G. Langbo, becoming the only Latino CEO of a Fortune 500 company. Gutierrez was also the youngest CEO in the company's nearly 100-year history.

In 1999, Kellogg faced a global decline or stagnation in cereal sales. Gutierrez's strategy, known as "Volume to Value," was to increase sales by focusing resources on higher-margin products. Higher-margin products targeted specific markets and included products such as Special K, Kashi, and Nutri-Grain bars. Extra income would fund advertising, promotions, and R&D, which would encourage further high-margin sales growth. "Volume is a means to an end--not an end," he said. "What counts is dollars."

In September 2004, Fortune Magazine dubbed Gutierrez as "The Man Who Fixed Kellogg", and attributed his success to "taking the slick salesmanship, financial discipline, and marketing savvy that he learned in his youth and blending it with disarming charisma, steely resolve, and an utter lack of pretension that you wouldn't expect in one so nattily dressed." The magazine also added that, "He even makes golf shirts look debonair."

== Secretary of Commerce ==
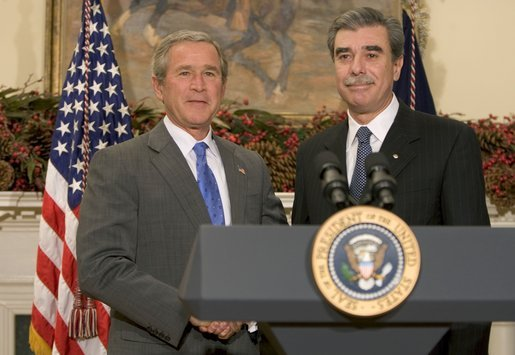
Gutierrez with President George W. Bush in November 2004

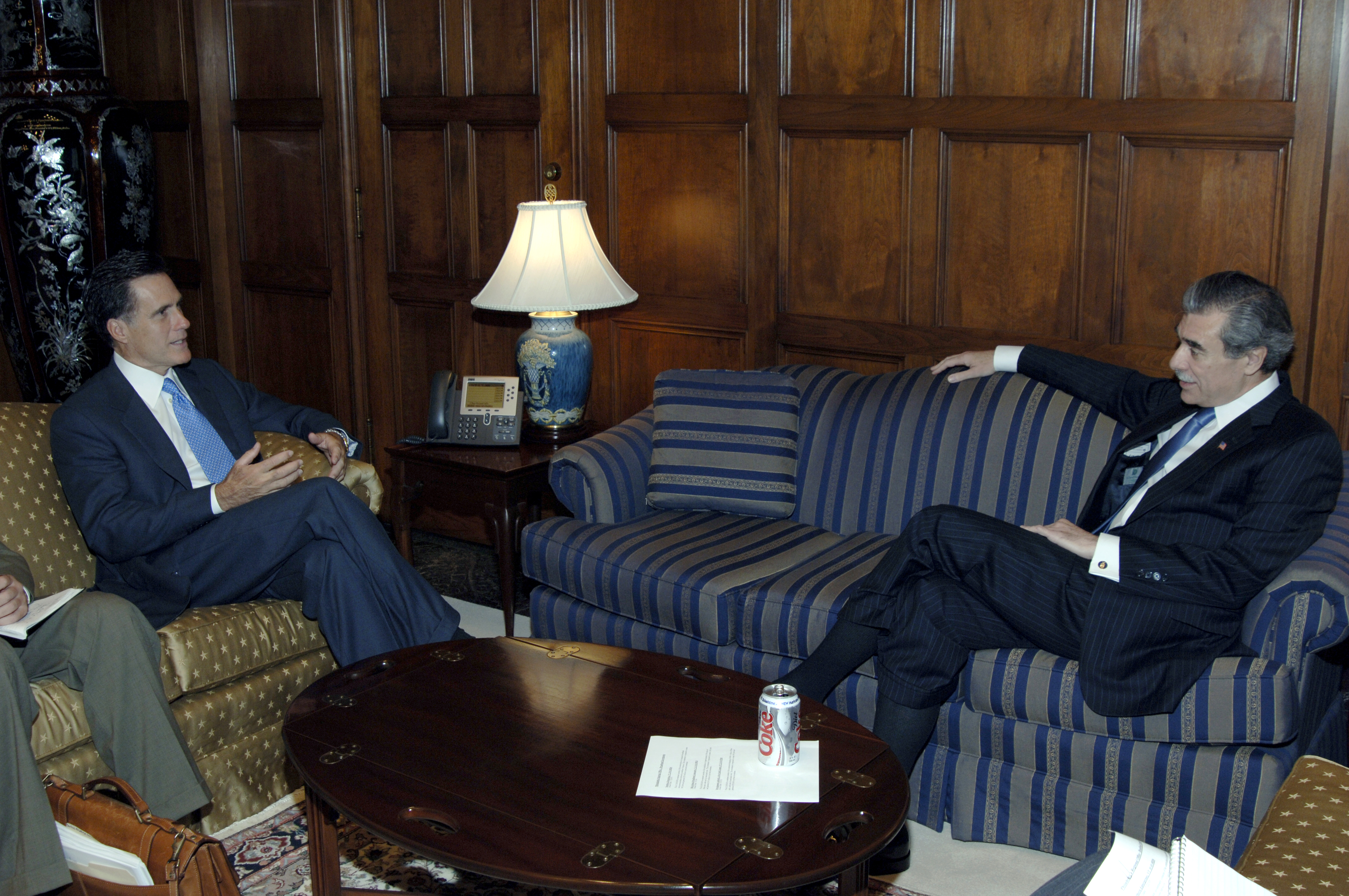
Gutierrez with Massachusetts Governor Mitt Romney in October 2005

On November 29, 2004, Gutierrez was chosen by President George W. Bush to become Secretary of Commerce, succeeding Donald Evans. On the same day, Kellogg's board of directors accepted Gutierrez's resignation as chairman of the board and CEO, to be effective upon his confirmation by the Senate and swearing-in. On January 24, 2005, Gutierrez was confirmed unanimously by the U.S. Senate; he was sworn in on February 7, 2005.

As Secretary of Commerce, Gutierrez also served as co-chair of the U.S. Commission for Assistance to a Free Cuba. Secretary Gutierrez was actively involved in U.S.-Cuba policy alongside Co-chair Secretary of State Condoleezza Rice.

Gutierrez was also one of the President's point men working with Congress to pass comprehensive immigration legislation, an issue he sees as one of the greatest domestic social issues of our time. He believes a successful immigration solution must focus first on securing our borders, but must also address immigrants' contribution to our economy and the importance of American unity.

Gutierrez played a key role in the passage of CAFTA-DR, a landmark trade agreement that expanded opportunities for U.S. exports throughout Latin America. Gutierrez was also instrumental in promoting the Colombia Free Trade Agreement. In 2006 Gutierrez called for Congress to “work with us and pass the pending Free Trade Agreements with Colombia, Korea and Panama, so we can have fair, two-way trade with our allies and friends.” He also led the first-ever domestic trade mission to the Gulf region in the wake of Hurricane Katrina.

In December 2007, Ken Silverstein, the Washington editor of Harper's Magazine, reported that Gutierrez had Adnan Oktar's Atlas of Creation, a book that advocates Islamic creationism and blames Charles Darwin for modern terrorism, including the 9/11 attacks, for display on a stand at the entrance to his U.S. government office. Gutierrez's office did not respond when asked whether the book had been purchased or mailed unsolicited to his office.

== Post-Bush administration ==
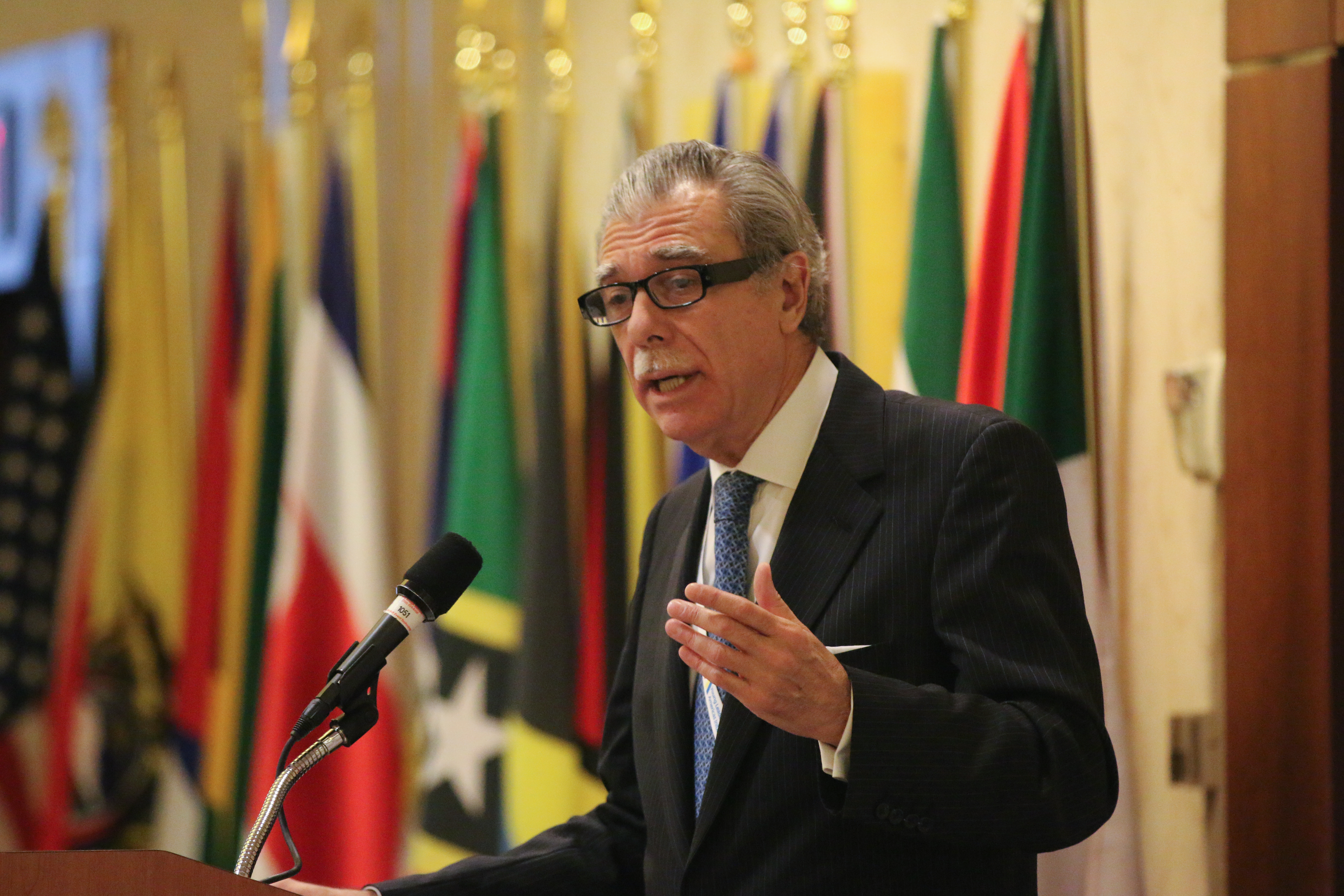
Gutierrez in November 2016

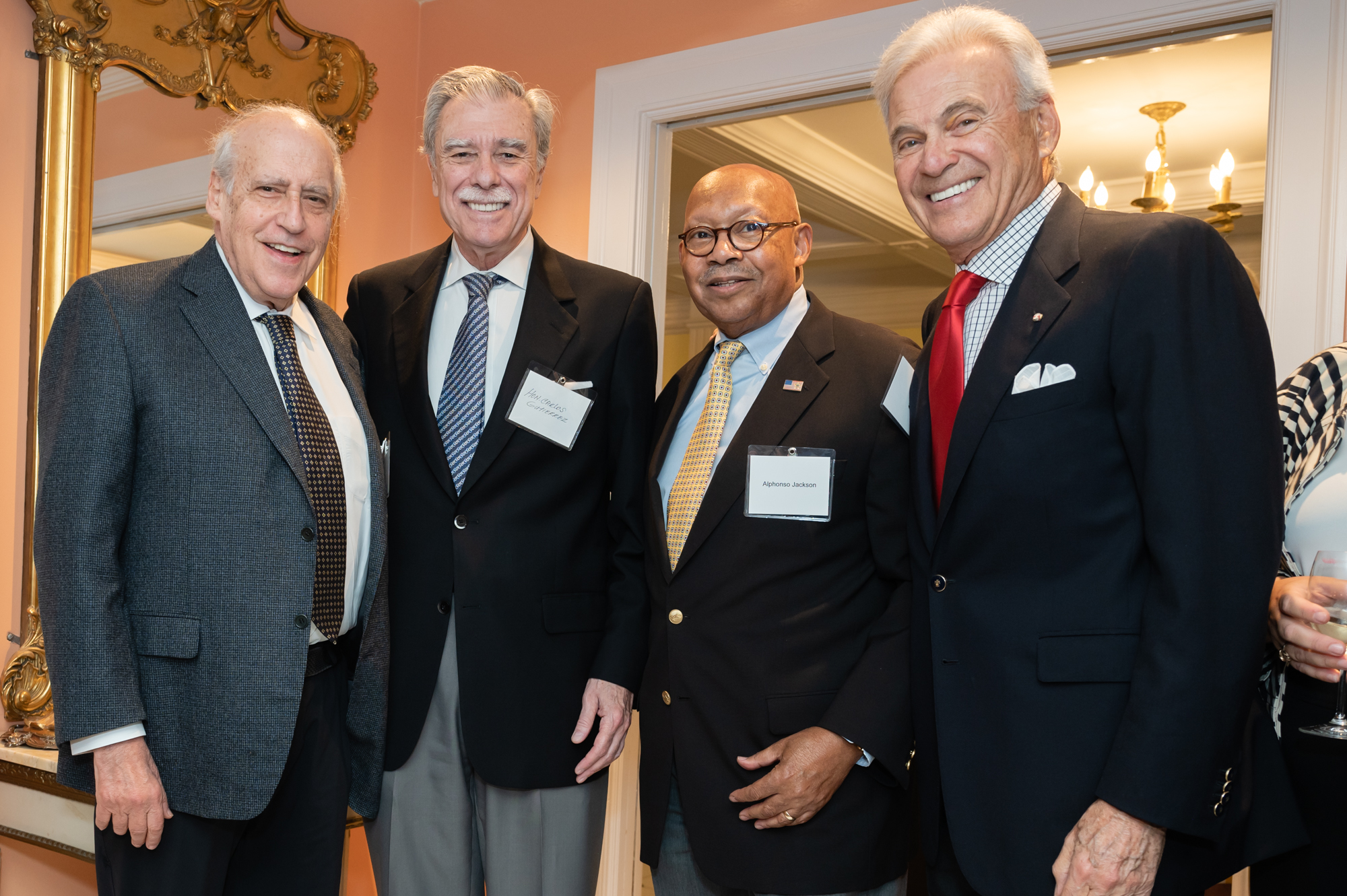
Gutierrez with Dan Glickman, Alphonso Jackson, and Stuart A. Bernstein in June 2023

Gutierrez was the founder and chairman of Global Political Strategies, an international strategic consulting service and a division of APCO Worldwide, a Washington-based global communications firm.

In February 2009, Gutierrez was named a Scholar at the University of Miami’s Institute For Cuban And Cuban American Studies. In April 2009, he joined the university's board of trustees. He is also Chairman of the Board of Trustees of Meridian International Center, as well as a member of the Board of Trustees of the Woodrow Wilson International Center for Scholars and the Bipartisan Debt Reduction Task Force.

On February 21, 2009, the Wall Street Journal reported that Gutierrez remained unemployed, along with a significant majority of George W. Bush's 3,000 political appointees who were seeking full-time employment. According to the article, 25% to 30% of those officials had found new jobs, a statistic notably lower than when Ronald Reagan, George H. W. Bush, and Bill Clinton left the White House. The article notes that "at least half those presidents' senior staffers landed employment within a month after the administration ended." Gutierrez commented that, "This is not a great time for anyone to be job hunting, including numerous former political appointees." He added that he hopes to run a company like Kellogg again because "I have a lot of energy." However, according to a press release from United Technologies Corporation, Gutierrez joined the company's board of directors on February 9, several days prior to the publication of the Wall Street Journal article.

According to press releases, Gutierrez also serves on the Board of Directors of Occidental Petroleum, GLW Corning, and Intelligent Global Pooling Systems. He is also a television news contributor for the business news television channel CNBC. In March 2010, Gutierrez said he would not like to return to a CEO spot at a foodmaker, because as commerce secretary, he had something different to do each day, whereas, "Business is pretty one-dimensional."

In December 2010, Gutierrez became a vice chairman of Citigroup in the Institutional Clients Group and member of the Senior Strategic Advisory Group. He left the company in February 2013

Gutierrez served as a member of the Debt Reduction Task Force at the Bipartisan Policy Center.

In 2012 Gutierrez lead the creation of the SuperPAC Republicans for Immigration Reform; he said he believed that "the far right of this party has taken the party to a place that it doesn't belong".

In 2013, Gutierrez was a signatory to an amicus curiae brief submitted to the Supreme Court in support of same-sex marriage during the Hollingsworth v. Perry case. On October of that same year, Time Warner elected him to its board of directors.

In August 2016, Gutierrez endorsed Hillary Clinton for president, stating that Donald Trump's economic policies were a "disaster". In 2020, he endorsed Joe Biden for president.

== Personal life ==
Gutierrez and his wife Edilia have one son, Carlos Jr., and two daughters, Erika and Karina.

== See also ==
- List of foreign-born United States Cabinet members

Political offices
Preceded by Donald Evans	United States Secretary of Commerce; 2005–2009	Succeeded by Gary Locke
U.S. order of precedence (ceremonial)
Preceded by Alberto Gonzales as Former U.S. Cabinet Member	Order of precedence of the United States as Former U.S. Cabinet Member	Succeeded by Michael Chertoff as Former U.S. Cabinet Member
