= Dick Swett =

American politician (born 1957)

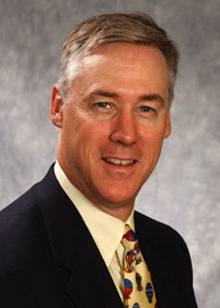
- Swett in 2005

United States Ambassador to Denmark
- In office September 8, 1998 – July 6, 2001
- President: Bill Clinton; George W. Bush
- Preceded by: Edward Elson
- Succeeded by: Stuart A. Bernstein

Member of the U.S. House of Representatives from New Hampshire's 2nd district
- In office January 3, 1991 – January 3, 1995
- Preceded by: Chuck Douglas
- Succeeded by: Charlie Bass

Personal details
- Born: Richard Nelson Swett; May 1, 1957 (age 69) Bryn Mawr, Pennsylvania, U.S.
- Party: Democratic
- Spouse: Katrina Lantos (m. 1980)
- Children: 7
- Education: Yale University (BA)

Richard Nelson Swett (born May 1, 1957) is an American politician and diplomat from the U.S. state of New Hampshire who served as the U.S. representative for New Hampshire's 2nd congressional district from 1991 to 1995. He also served as the U.S. ambassador to Denmark from 1998 to 2001.

== Early life, education and career ==
Swett was born in Bryn Mawr, Pennsylvania and moved to New Hampshire with his family as a child. He attended Yale University and then became an architect in San Francisco.

== Political career ==
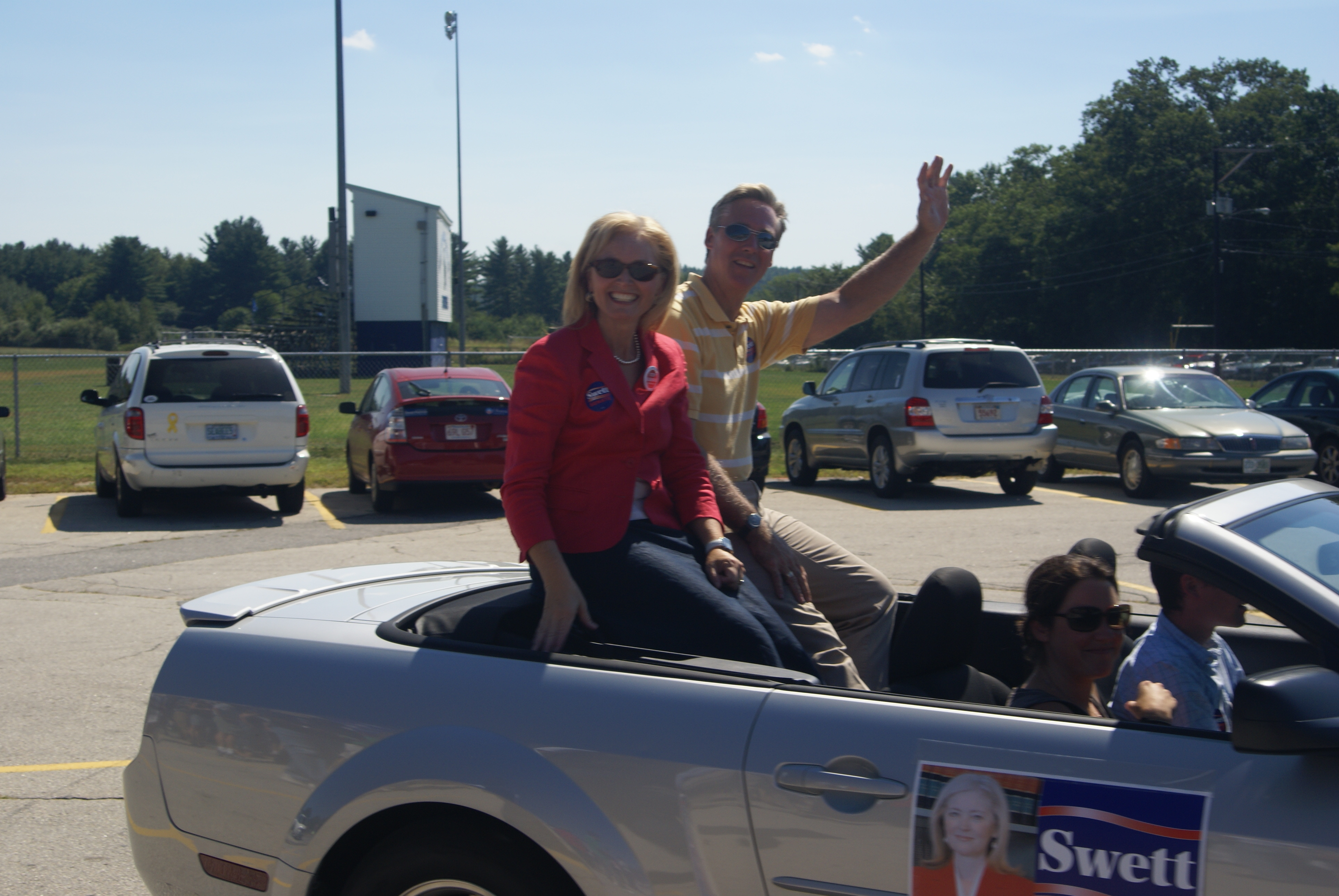
Katrina and Dick Swett, at 2008 Milford Labor Day parade

Swett became active in the Democratic Party and eventually began a political career. He was elected to the United States House of Representatives in November 1990 but was subsequently defeated in his November 1994 re-election bid.

In the run up to Swett's 1990 campaign, former Governor of New Hampshire Meldrim Thomson, Jr. complained unsuccessfully that listing him on the ballot as "Dick Swett" would be unlawfully misleading, since he was listed as "Lantos-Swett" in the telephone book, voter registration, deed to real property, and business.

Mitt Romney donated $250 to his 1992 campaign. They were fellow Mormons with homes on Lake Winnipesaukee.

In 1994, Swett voted for a bill to ban assault weapons that narrowly passed by two votes in the United States House of Representatives. His stand resulted in numerous threats against his life.

In 1996, Swett ran as a Democratic Party candidate for the Class 2 seat in the United States Senate from New Hampshire, against incumbent Republican Bob Smith, but was narrowly defeated. Smith had established himself as the most conservative Senator from the Northeast, and Bill Clinton's coattails nearly caused his defeat. On the night of the election many American media networks incorrectly projected that Swett had won.

In 1998, Bill Clinton appointed Swett to be United States Ambassador to Denmark. He served in that position until 2001, and then moved back to New Hampshire. Swett and Larry Coben wrote the national energy policy for Senator Joseph Lieberman's 2004 presidential campaign.

Swett returned to the field of architecture, assuming the position of Managing Principal for the Washington office of Leo A. Daly before becoming co-founder and CEO of Climate Prosperity Enterprise Solutions.

Swett is a member of the ReFormers Caucus of Issue One.

On August 12, 2019, Swett endorsed Joe Biden for President.

== Personal life ==
Swett is a member of the Church of Jesus Christ of Latter-day Saints (LDS Church). In 1980, he married Katrina Lantos, a former congressional candidate and daughter of Congressman Tom Lantos; she had previously converted to the LDS Church while a student at Yale. They have seven children.

== Publications ==
- Swett, Richard N. (2005). Leadership by design : creating an architecture of trust. Colleen M. Thornton, chief researcher; translations of Danish texts by Peter Wedell-Wedellsborg and Kenneth Krabat. Atlanta, GA: Greenway Communications. ISBN 0975565400. LCCN 2005282484.

U.S. House of Representatives
Preceded by Chuck Douglas	Member of the U.S. House of Representatives from New Hampshire's 2nd congressional district 1991–1995	Succeeded by Charlie Bass
Party political offices
Preceded by John A. Durkin	Democratic nominee for U.S. Senator from New Hampshire (Class 2); 1996	Succeeded by Jeanne Shaheen
Diplomatic posts
Preceded by Edward Elson	United States Ambassador to Denmark; 1998–2001	Succeeded by Stuart A. Bernstein
U.S. order of precedence (ceremonial)
Preceded by Peter G. Torkildsen as Former U.S. Representative	Order of precedence of the United States as Former U.S. Representative	Succeeded by Jeb Bradley as Former U.S. Representative
