= 2010 United States House of Representatives elections in New Hampshire =

- November 2, 2010

All 2 New Hampshire seats to the United States House of Representatives
	Majority party	Minority party
Party	Republican	Democratic
Last election	0	2
Seats won	2	0
Seat change	▲2	▼2
Popular vote	230,265	200,563
Percentage	51.19%	44.59%
Swing	▲7.52%	▼9.49%

Republican
40–50%
50–60%
60–70%
70–80%
Democratic
40–50%
50–60%
60–70%
70–80%
90–100%
Tie
40–50%
50%

The 2010 congressional elections in New Hampshire were held on November 2, 2010, to determine who will represent the state of New Hampshire in the United States House of Representatives. It coincided with the state's senatorial and gubernatorial elections. Representatives are elected for two-year terms; those elected served in the 112th Congress from January 2011 until January 2013.

New Hampshire had two seats in the House, apportioned according to the 2000 United States census. Both seats were held by Democrats in the 111th Congress. Following the elections, Republicans flipped both seats. This was mainly do to Republicans running up big numbers in Rockingham County for district 1 and Hillsborough County for district 2. As of 2024, this was the last time Republicans have won both U.S. House seats in New Hampshire. Both losing Democratic candidates – Carol Shea-Porter and Annie Kuster – ended up being elected to their respective seats in the next election.

== Overview ==
United States House of Representatives elections in New Hampshire, 2010
Party	Votes	Percentage	Seats	+/–
Republican	230,265	51.19%	2	+2
Democratic	200,563	44.59%	0	-2
Libertarian	12,762	2.84%	0	—
Independents	6,197	1.38%	0	—
Totals	449,787	100.00%	2	—

=== By district ===
Results of the 2010 United States House of Representatives elections in New Hampshire by district:

District	Republican		Democratic		Others		Total		Result
District	Votes	%	Votes	%	Votes	%	Votes	%	Result
District 1	121,655	54.04%	95,503	42.42%	7,966	3.54%	225,124	100.0%	Republican gain
District 2	108,610	48.34%	105,060	46.76%	10,993	4.89%	224,663	100.0%	Republican gain
Total	230,265	51.19%	200,563	44.59%	18,959	4.22%	449,787	100.0%	

== District 1 ==
2010 New Hampshire's 1st congressional district election
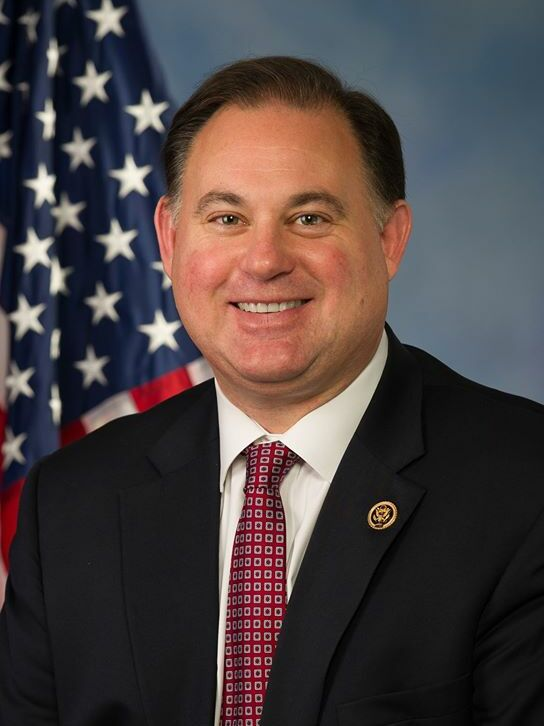

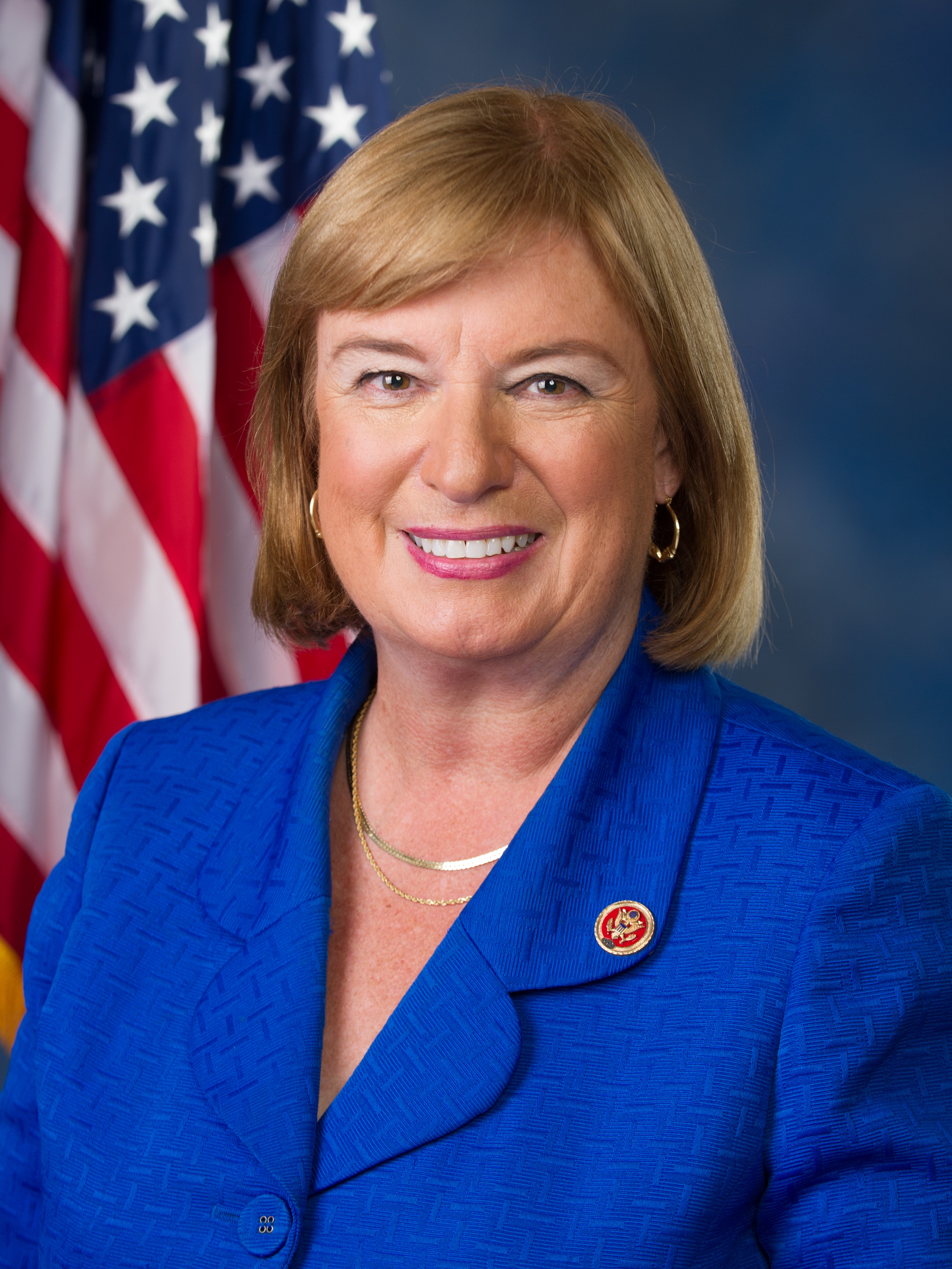
Nominee	Frank Guinta	Carol Shea-Porter
Party	Republican	Democratic
Popular vote	121,655	95,503
Percentage	54.0%	42.4%
- County results Guinta: 50–60% 60–70% Shea-Porter: 50–60%
U.S. Representative before election
Carol Shea-Porter (inc.)
Democratic
Elected U.S. Representative
Frank Guinta
Republican

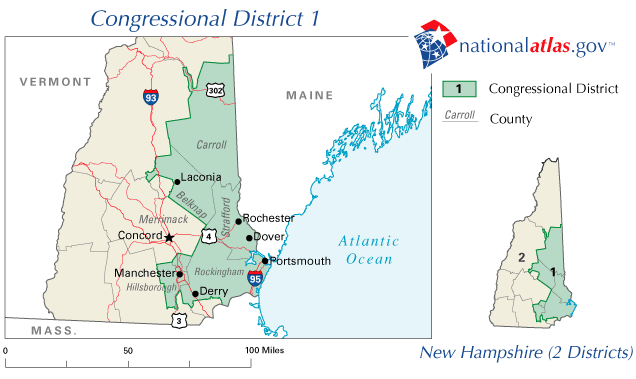

Democratic incumbent Carol Shea-Porter was defeated by Republican nominee and former Manchester Mayor Frank Guinta on November 2, 2010. Guinta lost re-election in 2012 in a rematch with Shea-Porter.

This district covers the southeastern and eastern portions of New Hampshire, consisting of three general areas: Greater Manchester, the Seacoast and the Lakes Region. It includes all of Carroll and Strafford counties, all but three towns of Rockingham County and all but two towns of Belknap County, as well as a small portion of Hillsborough County, and one town in Merrimack County.

=== Polling ===
Poll Source	Dates Administered	Carol Shea-Porter (D)	Frank Guinta (R)	Undecided
Granite State Poll	October 27–31, 2010	39%	46%	12%
OnMessage Inc.	October 20–21, 2010	37%	53%	-
The Hill	October 9–12, 2010	42%	47%	9%
Granite State Poll	October 7–12, 2010	36%	48%	11%
Granite State Poll	September 30, 2010	39%	49%	9%
American Research Group	September 27, 2010	40%	50%	8%
Granite State Poll	July 19–27, 2010	44%	39%	16%
Granite State Poll	April 18–28, 2010	38%	42%	19%
Public Policy Polling	April 17–18, 2010	45%	46%	10%
Granite State Poll	February 3, 2010	33%	43%	22%
Populus Research	September 2, 2009	46%	43%	10%
On Message Inc.	April 28, 2009	43%	34%	24%

==== Predictions ====
Source	Ranking	As of
The Cook Political Report	Lean R (flip)	November 1, 2010
Rothenberg	Likely R (flip)	November 1, 2010
Sabato's Crystal Ball	Lean R (flip)	November 1, 2010
RCP	Lean R (flip)	November 1, 2010
CQ Politics	Lean R (flip)	October 28, 2010
New York Times	Lean R (flip)	November 1, 2010
FiveThirtyEight	Likely R (flip)	November 1, 2010

=== Results ===
New Hampshire's 1st congressional district election, 2010
Party	Candidate	Votes	%
Republican	Frank Guinta	121,655	54.04
Democratic	Carol Shea-Porter (inc.)	95,503	42.42
Libertarian	Philip Hodson	7,966	3.54
Total votes		225,124	100.00
Republican gain from Democratic			

== District 2 ==
2010 New Hampshire's 2nd congressional district election
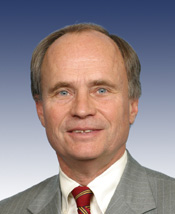

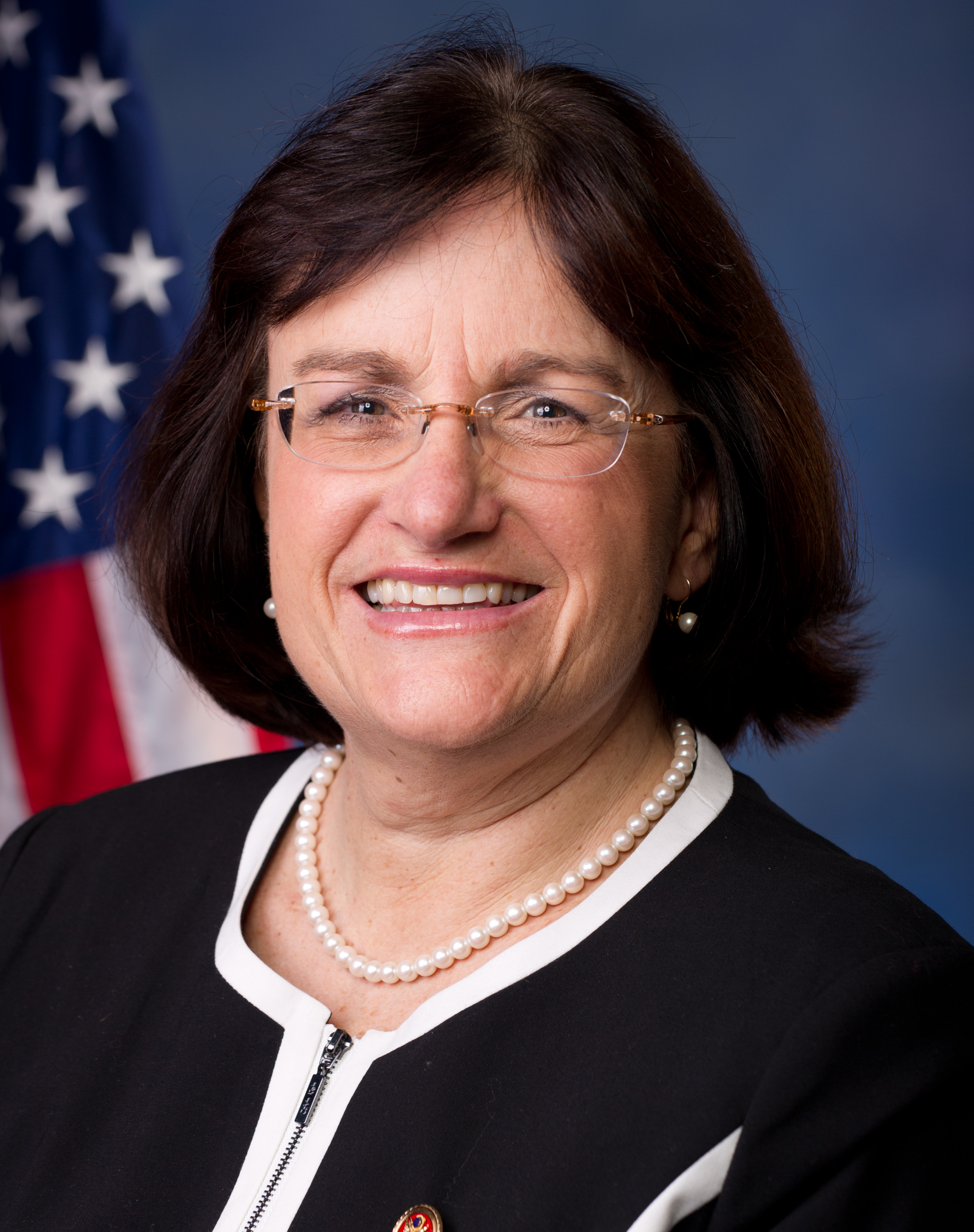
Nominee	Charles Bass	Ann McLane Kuster
Party	Republican	Democratic
Popular vote	108,610	105,060
Percentage	48.3%	46.8%
- Municipality results Bass: 40–50% 50–60% 60–70% Kuster: 40–50% 50–60% 60–70% 70–80% >90% No Votes
U.S. Representative before election
Paul Hodes
Democratic
Elected U.S. Representative
Charles Bass
Republican

Democratic candidate Ann McLane Kuster was defeated by Republican nominee and former Congressman Charles Bass on November 2, 2010. Bass lost re-election in 2012 in a rematch with Kuster.

The 2010 election for this seat was an open seat. Candidates running were Democratic nominee Ann McLane Kuster, Republican nominee Charles Bass, Libertarian nominee Howard Wilson, and Independent candidate Tim van Blommesteyn. In February 2009, Republican U.S. Senator Judd Gregg was briefly nominated to be President Barack Obama's Secretary of Commerce, but withdrew. Gregg announced after withdrawing his nomination that he would not run for re-election, leaving the seat open. Democratic incumbent Paul Hodes had announced his candidacy for the seat while Gregg had been nominated but had not yet withdrawn.

Concord attorney Ann McLane Kuster and Katrina Swett, faced off in the Democratic primary. (Two other candidates dropped out before the filing deadline in June 2010: State Representative John DeJoie and former Democratic gubernatorial candidate Mark Fernald.) Kuster was the eventual victor, 69–31.

On the Republican side, former state Representative Bob Giuda declared his candidacy for the seat. The 2008 Republican nominee for this seat, Jennifer Horn, announced her intentions to run a second time on October 7, 2009. Former six-term Congressman Charles Bass formed an exploratory committee to run for this seat on October 1, 2009, and later formally filed. In the resultant Republican primary, Charlie Bass narrowly defeated Jennifer Horn, with Giuda far behind.

This district consists of the western and northern portions of the state, including all of Cheshire, Coos, Grafton, and Sullivan counties as well as almost all of Merrimack and Hillsborough counties plus three towns in Rockingham County and two towns in Belknap County.

=== Polling ===
Poll Source	Dates Administered	Ann McLane Kuster (D)	Charlie Bass (R)	Undecided
Granite State Poll	October 27–31, 2010	43%	40%	11%
Granite State Poll	October 7–12, 2010	43%	36%	16%
The Hill/ANGA	October 5–7, 2010	42%	45%	9%
Granite State Poll	September 23–29, 2010	38%	43%	16%
American Research Group	September 22–26, 2010	36%	38%	21%
Granite State Poll	July 19–27, 2010	29%	47%	23%
Granite State Poll	April 18–28, 2010	30%	42%	27%
Granite State Poll	February 3, 2010	28%	39%	32%

==== Predictions ====
Source	Ranking	As of
The Cook Political Report	Tossup	November 1, 2010
Rothenberg	Tossup	November 1, 2010
Sabato's Crystal Ball	Lean R (flip)	November 1, 2010
RCP	Tossup	November 1, 2010
CQ Politics	Tossup	October 28, 2010
New York Times	Tossup	November 1, 2010
FiveThirtyEight	Tossup	November 1, 2010

=== Results ===
New Hampshire's 2nd congressional district election, 2010
Party	Candidate	Votes	%
Republican	Charles Bass	108,610	48.34
Democratic	Ann McLane Kuster	105,060	46.76
Independent	Tim vanBlommesteyn	6,197	2.76
Libertarian	Howard L. Wilson	4,796	2.13
Total votes		224,663	100.00
Republican gain from Democratic			
