= 1996 United States Senate election in New Hampshire =

- November 5, 1996
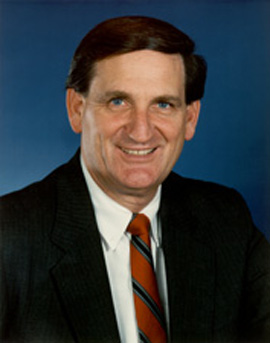

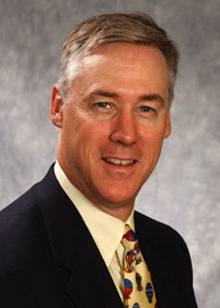
Nominee	Bob Smith	Dick Swett
Party	Republican	Democratic
Popular vote	242,304	227,397
Percentage	49.25%	46.22%
- Smith: 40–50% 50–60% 60–70% 70–80% 80–90% Swett: 40–50% 50–60% 60–70% 80–90% >90%
U.S. senator before election
Bob Smith
Republican
Elected U.S. Senator
Bob Smith
Republican

The 1996 United States Senate election in New Hampshire was held on November 5, 1996. Incumbent Republican U.S. Senator Bob Smith won re-election to a second term. Smith had established himself as the most conservative senator from the Northeast, and Bill Clinton's coattails nearly caused his defeat. That was to the point that on the night of the election many American media networks incorrectly projected that Dick Swett had won.

== Republican primary ==
=== Candidates ===
- Bob Smith, incumbent U.S. senator

=== Results ===
1996 Republican U.S. Senate primary
Party	Candidate	Votes	%
Republican	Bob Smith (incumbent)	85,223	100.00%
Total votes		85,223	100.00%

== Democratic primary ==
=== Candidates ===
- John Rauh, founder of Americans for Campaign Reform, former CEO of Griffon Corporation, and candidate for U.S. Senate in 1990
- Dick Swett, former U.S. representative from Bow

=== Results ===
1996 Democratic U.S. Senate primary
Party	Candidate	Votes	%
Democratic	Dick Swett	32,443	52.47%
Democratic	John Rauh	29,393	47.53%
Total votes		61,836	100.00%

== Libertarian primary ==
=== Candidates ===
- Ken Blevens

=== Results ===
1996 Libertarian U.S. Senate primary
Party	Candidate	Votes	%
Libertarian	Ken Blevens	663	100.00%
Total votes		663	100.00%

== General election ==
=== Candidates ===
- Ken Blevens (Libertarian)
- Bob Smith, incumbent U.S. senator (Republican)
- Dick Swett, former U.S. representative from Bow (Democratic)

=== Results ===
General election results
Party	Candidate	Votes	%	±%
Republican	Bob Smith (incumbent)	242,304	49.25%	▼15.88
Democratic	Dick Swett	227,397	46.22%	▲14.89
Libertarian	Ken Blevens	22,265	4.53%	▲1.19
Total votes		491,966	100.00%	
Republican hold		Swing		

== See also ==
- 1996 United States Senate elections
