= Bob Smith (New Hampshire politician) =

American politician (born 1941)

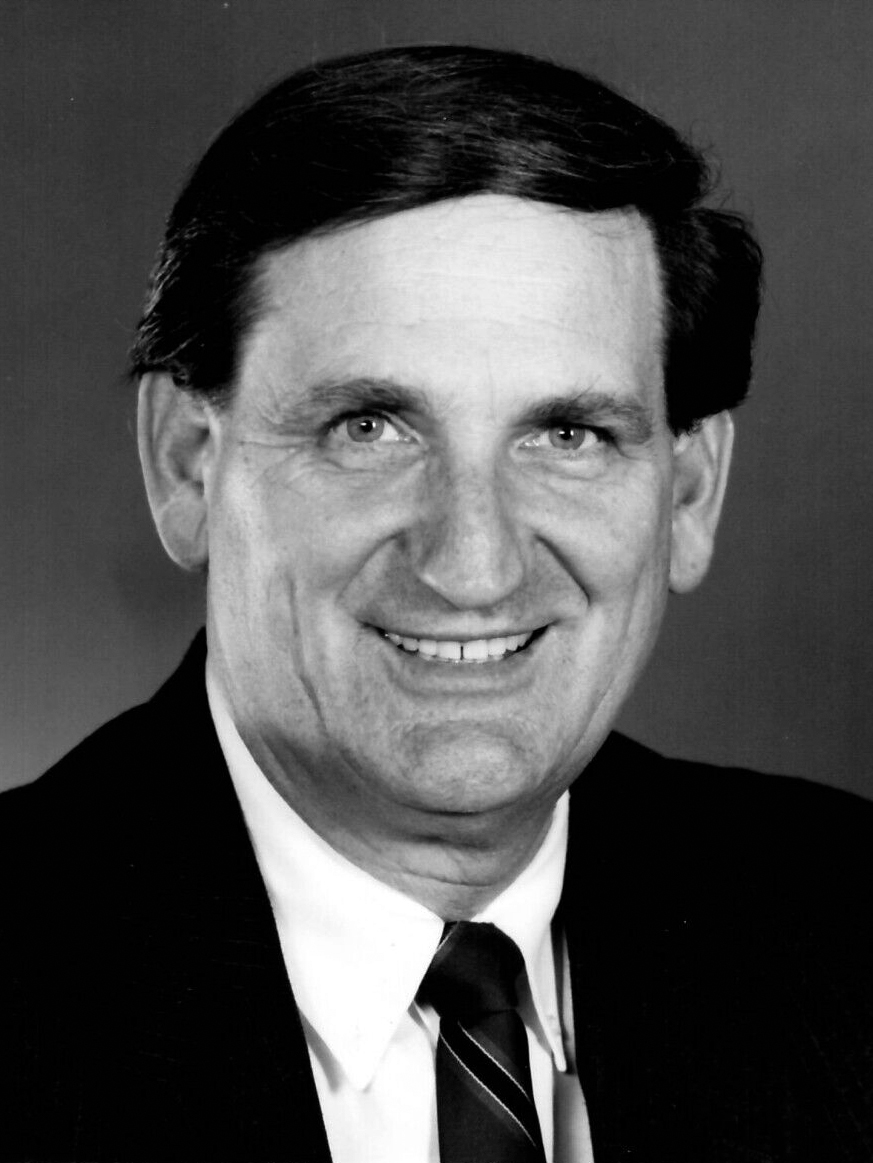

Chair of the Senate Environment Committee
- In office January 20, 2001 – June 6, 2001
- Preceded by: Harry Reid
- Succeeded by: Jim Jeffords
- In office November 2, 1999 – January 3, 2001
- Preceded by: John Chafee
- Succeeded by: Harry Reid

Chair of the Senate Ethics Committee
- In office January 3, 1997 – November 2, 1999
- Preceded by: Mitch McConnell
- Succeeded by: Pat Roberts

United States Senator from New Hampshire
- In office December 7, 1990 – January 3, 2003
- Preceded by: Gordon J. Humphrey
- Succeeded by: John E. Sununu

Member of the U.S. House of Representatives from New Hampshire's 1st district
- In office January 3, 1985 – December 7, 1990
- Preceded by: Norman D'Amours
- Succeeded by: Bill Zeliff

Personal details
- Born: Robert Clinton Smith; March 30, 1941 (age 85) Trenton, New Jersey, U.S.
- Party: Republican (before 1999, 2000–present); Constitution (1999); Independent (1999–2000)
- Spouse: Mary Jo Hutchinson (m. 1966)
- Children: 3
- Education: Lafayette College (BA); California State University, Long Beach (attended)

Military service
- Branch/service: United States Navy
- Years of service: 1965–1967 (active); 1962–1965, 1967–1969 (reserve)
- Battles/wars: Vietnam War
- Smith's voice Smith discussing interdepartmental conflicts within the Clinton administration on the Comprehensive Nuclear-Test-Ban Treaty. Recorded October 13, 1999

Robert Clinton Smith (born March 30, 1941) is an American politician who served as a member of the United States House of Representatives for New Hampshire's 1st congressional district from 1985 to 1990 and the state of New Hampshire in the United States Senate from 1990 to 2003.

First elected to the House of Representatives as a Republican in 1984, he was re-elected twice before running for the Senate in 1990, winning the open seat and assuming it early when incumbent Gordon J. Humphrey resigned. He was re-elected in 1996 and then entered the Republican primary for the 2000 presidential election. After failing to gain traction, he withdrew before the primaries began and joined the Taxpayers' Party, seeking their nomination instead. He then changed parties again, becoming an independent before dropping out of the presidential race altogether. He then re-joined the Republican Party after the Chairmanship of the Senate Committee on Environment and Public Works became open, which he then assumed.

Smith ran for re-election in 2002 but lost the Republican primary to Congressman John E. Sununu, who won the general election. After his defeat he moved to Florida and briefly ran for the Senate from there in 2004 and in 2010, but dropped out early on in both cases after faring poorly in polls of the Republican primary. He subsequently returned to New Hampshire, where he declared his candidacy for the Republican nomination in the 2014 Senate election, but was defeated in the Republican primary by former U.S. Senator from Massachusetts Scott Brown.

== Early life ==
Smith was born in Trenton, New Jersey, the son of Margaret (née Eldridge) and Donald Smith. He obtained a bachelor's degree from Lafayette College in 1965 and did graduate work at California State University, Long Beach. He served in the United States Navy Reserve from 1962 to 1965 as an ensign, and was on active duty from 1965 to 1967, including a year in Vietnam. He remained in the Navy Reserve until 1969. Smith settled in Wolfeboro, New Hampshire, where he taught history and English. He also served on his local school board and got into the real estate business as owner and operator of the Yankee Pedlar brokerage.

== Political career ==
=== U.S. House of Representatives ===
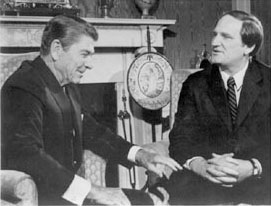
Smith with President Ronald Reagan

Smith ran for New Hampshire's 1st congressional district in the 1982 elections. With the recession and President Ronald Reagan's unpopularity aiding Democratic candidates, Smith lost to incumbent Norman D'Amours by 55% to 45%. D'Amours did not seek re-election in 1984, unsuccessfully running for the U.S. Senate instead and Smith was elected in his place, riding Reagan's coattails to beat Democrat Dudley Dudley by 59% to 40%. A member of the Executive Council of New Hampshire, her campaign slogan was "Dudley Dudley, Worth Repeating". Smith responded "Dudley Dudley, Liberal Liberal". Smith was re-elected in 1986 and 1988 by wide margins, first beating Democrat James M. Demers 56% to 44%, then beating Democrat Joseph F. Keefe by 60% to 40%.

=== U.S. Senate ===
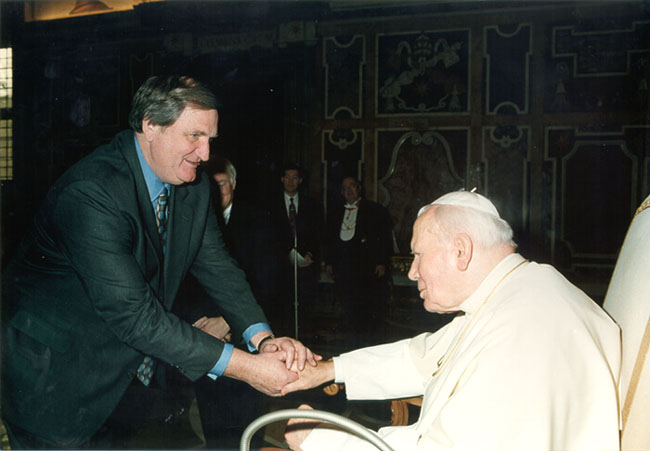
Smith greeting Pope John Paul II in 2001

Smith did not run for re-election in 1990, instead running for the U.S. Senate seat that was being vacated by retiring Republican Gordon J. Humphrey, who was retiring after pledging not to serve more than two terms. His opponent was Democrat John A. Durkin, who had previously served in the Senate from 1975 to 1980. Smith defeated him in a landslide, taking 65% of the vote to Durkin's 31%. Humphrey resigned in December after being elected to the New Hampshire Senate, and Smith was appointed to replace him for the final 27 days of his U.S. Senate term.

The Vietnam War POW/MIA issue, concerning the fate of possible missing or captured Americans in Vietnam, became Smith's major issue in Congress in 1985, partly spurred on by his growing up without knowing how his own father died in World War II. Smith helped create, and served as vice-chairman of, the 1991–1993 Senate Select Committee on POW/MIA Affairs. Smith ran for re-election in 1996 and only narrowly defeated Democratic former U.S. Representative Richard Swett, taking 49% of the vote to Swett's 46%. Smith had established himself as the most conservative Senator from the Northeast, and Bill Clinton's coattails nearly caused his defeat. On the night of the election many American media networks incorrectly projected that Swett had won.

During his tenure in the Senate, Smith was a strident opponent of gay rights. In 1994, Smith and fellow Republican senator Jesse Helms of North Carolina introduced an amendment denying federal funding to schools which promoted homosexuality in their curricula. The amendment passed by a 63–36 vote. In October 1997, President Bill Clinton nominated openly gay diplomat James Hormel to be United States Ambassador to Luxembourg, the first time an openly LGBT person had been nominated for an ambassadorship. Smith, with fellow Republican Senators James Inhofe and Tim Hutchinson, campaigned vigorously against Hormel's nomination. Along with Helms, he was also one of three Senators to vote against the confirmation of Ruth Bader Ginsburg to the U.S. Supreme Court in the same term.

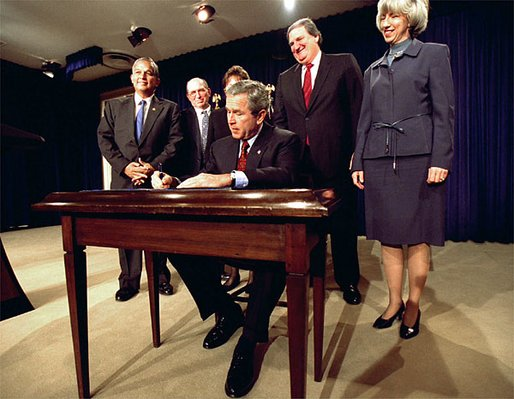
Smith, second from right, watches as President George W. Bush signs a bill in 2002.

In February 1999, at Kingswood Regional High School in Wolfeboro, Smith announced that he was a candidate for the Republican nomination for President of the United States (at the time the front-runner was Texas Governor George W. Bush). In July, after failing to gain any ground in the presidential race and before any primaries or caucuses had taken place, Smith announced he was leaving the Republican Party and would seek the nomination of the Taxpayers' Party. One month later, Smith left the Taxpayers Party after claiming that ideologues within the party resisted his candidacy due to his Roman Catholicism and announced as an independent. He withdrew completely from the race in October and endorsed Bush.

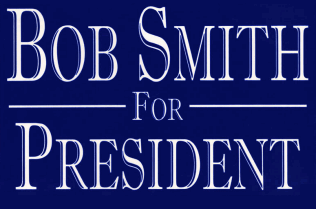
Logo from Smith's 2000 Presidential campaign

In the meantime, Republican senator John Chafee of Rhode Island had died and thus the chairmanship of the Senate Committee on Environment and Public Works had re-opened. Smith recanted his repudiation of the Republican party, claiming it had been "a mistake" and claiming that since he had never officially changed his voting registration that he had never left the party. Smith was then elected as Chafee's successor to the chairmanship.

Some New Hampshire voters were uncomfortable with Smith's passionate way of expressing his views on certain issues. In one case, he used a pair of scissors to stab a plastic doll on the Senate floor to illustrate his anti-abortion stance.

In 2000, Smith attempted to assist the Miami-based family of Elián González after Elián was returned to his father's custody by accompanying them to the entrance of Andrews Air Force Base, where Elián was being held; they were turned away.

Smith ran for re-election to a third term in 2002, but was defeated in the Republican primary by Congressman John E. Sununu, winning 45% of the vote to Sununu's 53%. After his defeat, The New York Times reported that many Republicans were "relieved" that he had lost, having never forgiven him for leaving the party in 1999. He subsequently moved to Sarasota, Florida to sell real estate.

== Post-congressional career ==
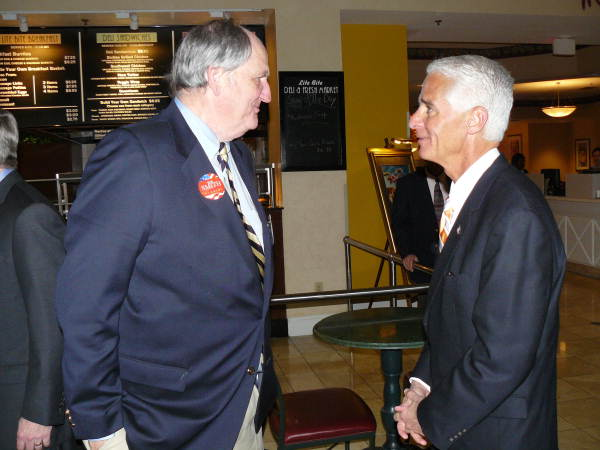
Smith chatting with Charlie Crist in 2010

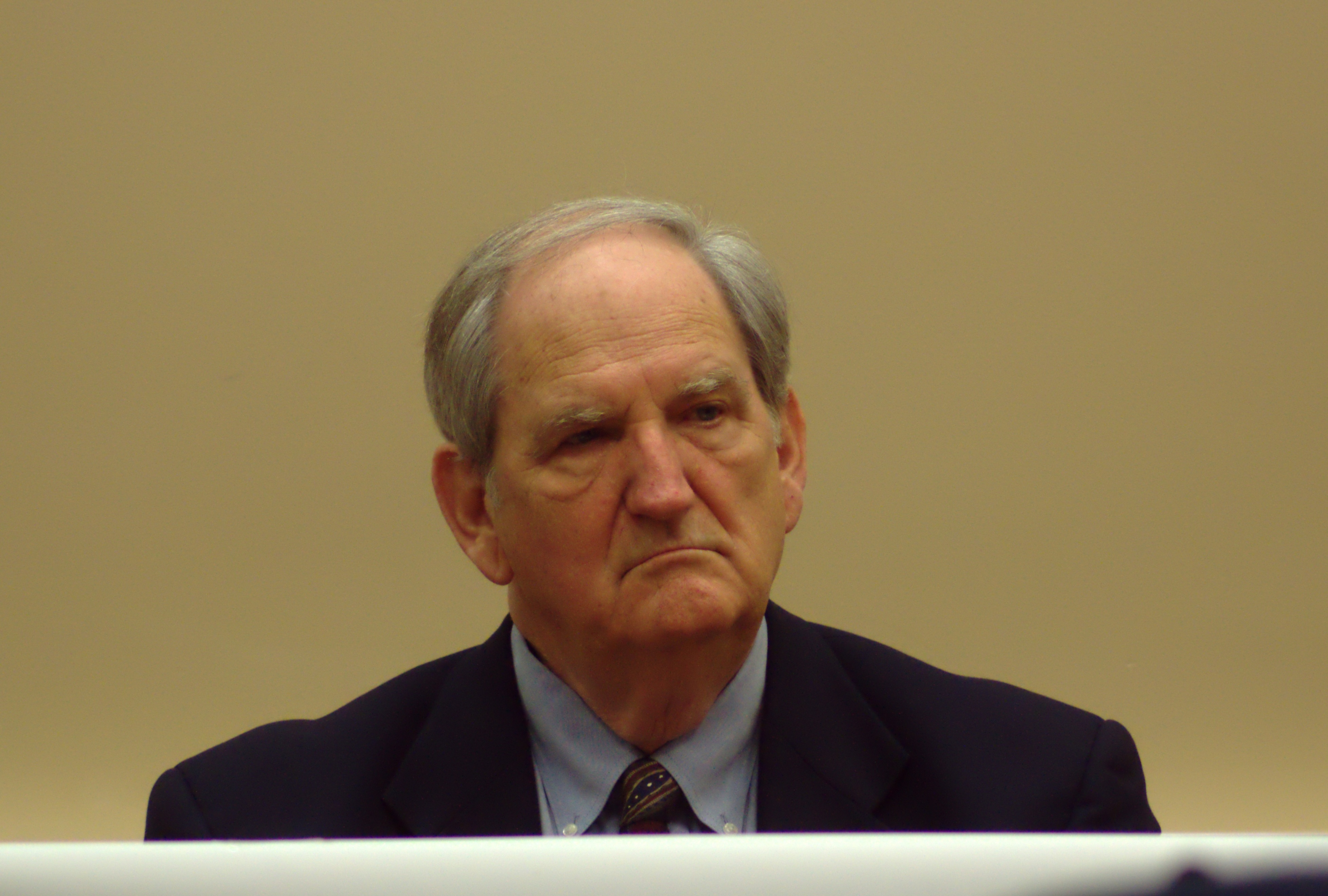
Smith in 2014

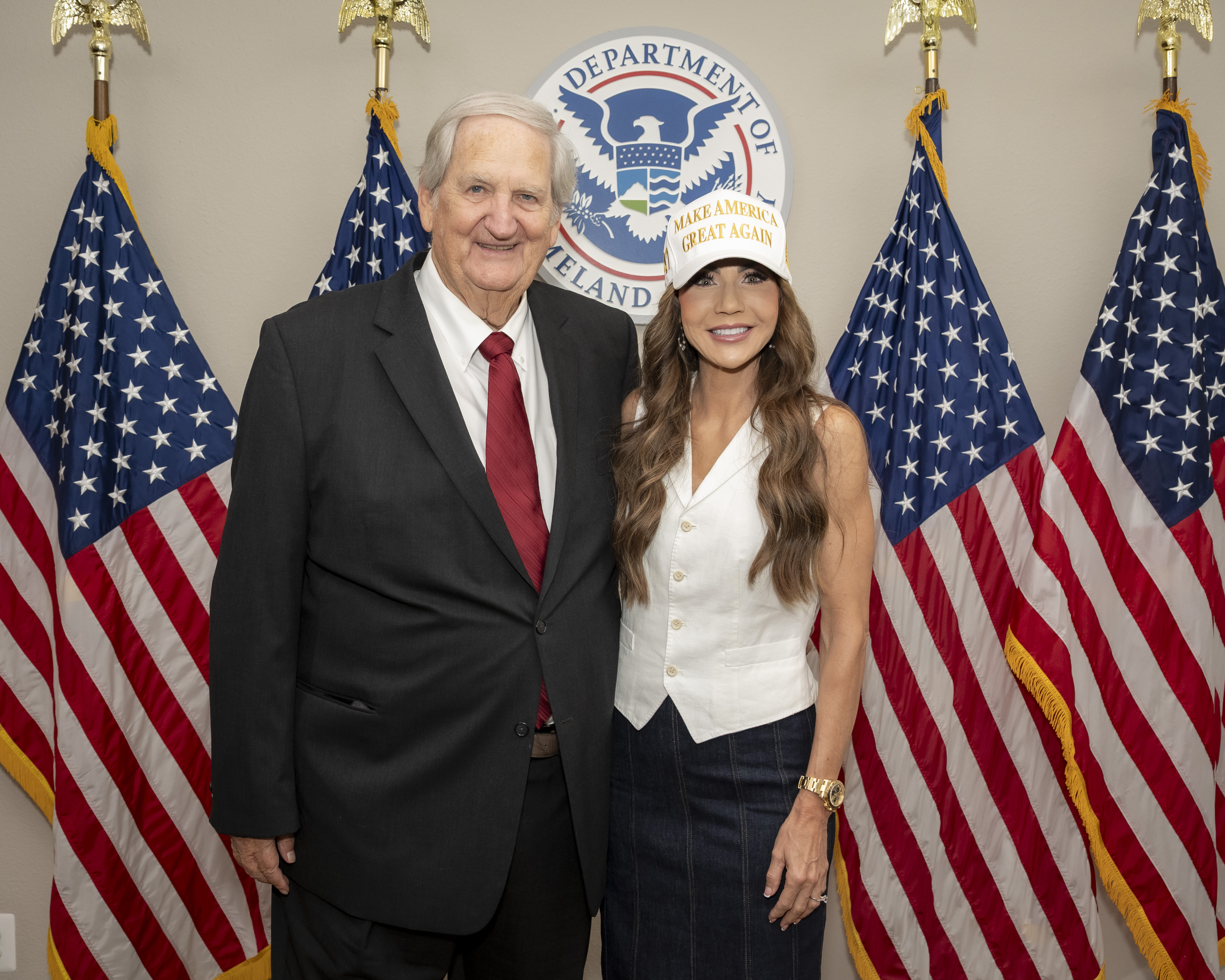
Smith with Kristi Noem in 2025

In 2003, Smith founded the American Patriot Foundation, to support "the families of soldiers lost in war." As of 2014, its website describes the group as "a non-partisan, non-profit national foundation with the primary function of educating the American public as to the importance and relevance in today's society of the United States Constitution, the Declaration of Independence, The Federalist Papers, and other founding documents." In 2003, Smith turned the running of the group over to a friend and it became essentially dormant. The group was re-activated in 2010 during the court-martial of Terry Lakin, a lieutenant colonel in the United States Army, who refused to deploy to Afghanistan because of his concerns over President Obama's alleged constitutional ineligibility to be president. The APF supported Lakin and released a video where he explained his intent to disobey what he believed to be "illegal orders". Asked whether he supported the group's work for Lakin, Smith said: "...my personal belief is that when an officer has a constitutional question I don't have a problem with that being answered, that's his legal right to have that answered, but I'm not involved in it."

Smith ran in the 2004 primary for Florida's U.S. Senate seat against Mel Martinez, but dropped out after raising little money and receiving less than 1% support in Republican polls. Martinez would go on to win the general election, 49.5% to 48.4% against Democratic candidate Betty Castor.

Less than a month before the November 2004 U.S. Senate election in New Hampshire, Smith wrote an op-ed for the Concord Monitor in which he denounced the lack of Republican outrage over that party's phone jamming on Election Day 2002, when Republican operatives had flooded phone banks with incoming calls to hamper them from being used by Democratic party workers to contact Shaheen supporters to get them to the polls. Smith implied that this action may have made the difference in then-Governor Jeanne Shaheen's narrow loss to Sununu.

In January 2008, Smith began writing editorials on the web page of the Constitution Party (formerly called the U.S. Taxpayers' Party), which fueled speculation that Smith intended to seek that party's presidential nomination. Its nomination went to Chuck Baldwin, a Baptist pastor.

In February 2009, with Martinez having announced that he would retire from the Senate in January 2011, Smith was again considering running for the seat, although it was also reported that he was considering a return to New Hampshire to run for the Senate seat there, especially if his old nemesis John E. Sununu (who was defeated for re-election in 2008) sought the seat.

On April 9, 2009, Politico reported that Smith would seek the Republican nomination for Florida's 2010 Senate election. He dropped out of the race in March 2010, after faring poorly in the polls against Governor Charlie Crist and Marco Rubio.

In mid-2013 Smith expressed interest in facing Democratic incumbent Jeanne Shaheen in the 2014 Senate election. In October he ruled out a run, but in December announced that he had reconsidered. He officially declared his candidacy for the Republican nomination in March 2014. However, he lost the primary to former U.S. Senator Scott Brown, who from 2010 to 2012 had served the remainder of Senator Ted Kennedy's term in Massachusetts.

== Political positions ==
Smith was described as a "staunch conservative" by media when he launched his presidential campaign. During his time in the senate and congress, Smith introduced and sponsored several anti abortion bills, notably the Partial-Birth Abortion Ban Act of 2000. Smith was reported as comparing abortion to slavery when discussing the bill on the senate floor. Smith opposed the nomination of Ruth Bader Ginsburg. Smith was pro-firearm, sponsoring legislation like the Secure Access to Firearms Enhancement (S.A.F.E.) Act of 2001. The bill would have forced concealed carry reciprocity between states by anyone with a valid license. In 1993, Senator Bob Smith had been a witness to the CIA headquarters shooting. He also attempted to constrain the Exclusionary rule.

== Personal life ==
He and his wife Mary Jo have three children. He is a Roman Catholic.

== See also ==
- List of American politicians who switched parties in office
- List of United States senators who switched parties

U.S. House of Representatives
Preceded by Norman D'Amours	Member of the U.S. House of Representatives from New Hampshire's 1st congressional district 1985–1990	Succeeded by Bill Zeliff
Party political offices
Preceded by Gordon Humphrey	Republican nominee for Senator from New Hampshire (Class 2); 1990, 1996	Succeeded by John E. Sununu
U.S. Senate
Preceded by Gordon J. Humphrey	United States senator (Class 2) from New Hampshire; 1990–2003; Served alongside: Warren Rudman, Judd Gregg	Succeeded by John E. Sununu
Preceded by Mitch McConnell	Chair of the Senate Ethics Committee; 1997–1999	Succeeded by Pat Roberts
Preceded by John Chafee	Chair of the Senate Environment Committee; 1999–2001	Succeeded by Harry Reid
Preceded by Max Baucus	Ranking Member of the Senate Environment Committee; 2001	Succeeded by Harry Reid
Preceded by Harry Reid	Chair of the Senate Environment Committee; 2001	Succeeded by Jim Jeffords
Preceded by Harry Reid	Ranking Member of the Senate Environment Committee; 2001–2003	Succeeded by Jim Jeffords
U.S. order of precedence (ceremonial)
Preceded by Gordon J. Humphrey as Former U.S. Senator	Order of precedence of the United States as Former U.S. Senator	Succeeded by Chuck Robb as Former U.S. Senator
