= Charles Bass =

American politician (born 1952)

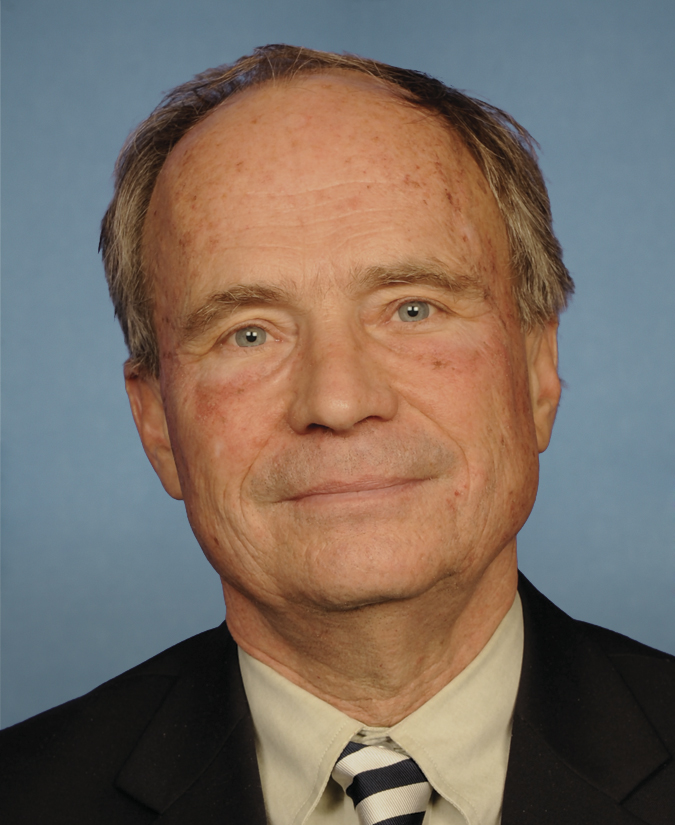

Member of the U.S. House of Representatives from New Hampshire's 2nd district
- In office January 3, 2011 – January 3, 2013
- Preceded by: Paul Hodes
- Succeeded by: Annie Kuster
- In office January 3, 1995 – January 3, 2007
- Preceded by: Richard Swett
- Succeeded by: Paul Hodes

Member of the New Hampshire Senate from the 11th district
- In office January 1989 – January 1993
- Preceded by: Jean White
- Succeeded by: David Wheeler

Personal details
- Born: Charles Foster Bass; January 8, 1952 (age 74) Boston, Massachusetts, U.S.
- Party: Republican
- Spouse: Lisa Bass
- Education: Dartmouth College (BA)

Charles Foster Bass (born January 8, 1952) is an American politician and member of the Republican Party who served as a member of the United States House of Representatives for New Hampshire's 2nd congressional district from 1995 to 2007 and 2011 to 2013. He is the son of Perkins Bass, who also represented the same New Hampshire district from 1955 to 1963.

== Early life, education, and early political career ==
Bass was born in Boston to Katharine and Perkins Bass. His father served as a Republican U.S. Congressman from New Hampshire in the 1950s and 1960s. Bass's grandfather Robert Bass served as Republican governor of New Hampshire from 1911 to 1913, founded the Progressive Republican movement, and was a friend/confidant of President Teddy Roosevelt.

Charles Bass attended the Holderness School in Holderness, New Hampshire, where he was elected President of the school in his senior year. Bass graduated from Dartmouth College in 1974.

During 1974 Bass worked for Maine Republican U.S. Congressman William Cohen. From 1975 to 1979 Bass worked for Maine Republican U.S. Congressman David F. Emery. Bass served in the New Hampshire General Court from 1982 to 1988.

== New Hampshire Senate ==
In 1988, he ran for the New Hampshire Senate, defeating incumbent Jean White in the Republican primary, and defeating candidate Daniel M. Burnham in the general election. He served there until 1992. While in the State Senate, he represented Peterborough. He was a supporter of tort reform and some abortion rights.

== U.S. House of Representatives ==
=== Elections ===
1980

After incumbent Republican Congressman James Colgate Cleveland of New Hampshire's 2nd congressional district decided to retire, Bass entered the race to succeed him. Then-Executive Councillor Judd Gregg won the Republican primary with 34% of the vote. State Senator Susan McLane, the mother of future Congresswoman Ann McLane Kuster, came second with 25%, Bass came third with 22% and former deputy executive director of the Domestic Policy Council Robert W. Sweet came fourth with 7%. Five other candidates took the remaining 12%. Gregg went on to win the general election.

Intervening years

In 1988, Gregg did not run for re-election, instead running successfully for Governor of New Hampshire. Bass, however, did not run to succeed him. Charles Douglas III won the election but was defeated in 1990 by Democrat Richard Swett, who was comfortably re-elected in 1992.

1994

Bass ran for the 2nd District again, winning the Republican primary with 29% of the vote. Mike Hammond came second with 24%, Ward Scott was third with 20%, attorney and future New Hampshire Supreme Court Justice James P. Bassett was fourth with 14% and businessman Theo de Winter came fifth with 5%. Eight others split the remaining 8% of the vote. In the general election, he rode the Republican Revolution to defeat incumbent Richard Swett by 51% to 46%.

1996

In the Republican primary, he was challenged by Mike Hammond, who had finished second two years previously. Bass easily defeated him, taking 66% of the vote to Hammond's 27%. Dana Albert came third with 3%, Robert J. Kulak came fourth with 2% and future State Representative Tom Alciere came fifth with 1%. Write-in candidates took the remaining 1%. In the general election, Bass was re-elected to a second term against former State Senator and 1992 gubernatorial nominee Deborah Arnie Arnesen by 51% to 44%.

1998–2004

Between 1998 and 2004, Bass was re-elected by ever increasing margins. In 1998, he beat Mary Rauh by 53% to 45%. In 2000, he was re-elected to a fourth term against attorney Barney Brannen by 56% to 41%. In 2002, Rep. Bass defeated Richard Swett's wife, Katrina Swett, by 57% to 41%. In 2004, he was challenged in the Republican primary by State Representative Mark Brady, whom Bass defeated by 71% to 29%. In the general election, he defeated attorney Paul Hodes by 59% to 38%, which remains the best election performance of his career.

2006

In the Republican primary, Bass won 75% to Berlin Mayor Bob Danderson's 13% and Mary Maxwell's 11%. In the general election, Hodes ran against Bass in a rematch. In late September, a top Bass staffer resigned after news broke that a U.S. government computer from Bass' D.C. office had been posting anonymous concern troll messages to New Hampshire blogs. In these messages, "IndyNH" claimed to be a supporter of Paul Hodes who was discouraged by Bass' unbeatable lead and urged other Hodes supporters to turn their efforts to other, more winnable races. Hodes out-raised Bass and the race was predicted to be more competitive than two years previously. Initially, Bass maintained early leads over Hodes in most polls, ranging from just seven points in one poll to twenty-seven in another. However, as the election drew nearer, polls indicated either a slight Hodes lead or a general tossup. Just before election day, Hodes pulled in front of Bass in numerous polls. On election day at 10:30 pm, Bass conceded defeat to Hodes, who garnered 53% of the vote as opposed to 45% for Bass.

2010

In 2010, Hodes declined to seek re-election to run for the U.S. Senate. Bass ran for his old seat and won the Republican primary with 42%. Jennifer Horn, the nominee for the seat in 2008, came second with 35% and State Representative Bob Giuda came third with 17%. Two other candidates took the remaining 5% of the vote. In the general election, Bass faced Ann McLane Kuster, daughter of Susan McLane, who had finished ahead of Bass in the Republican primary in 1980. Polls initially showed Bass with a wide lead but the race narrowed and Kuster pulled ahead in the final polls. Ultimately, despite the Republicans making widespread gains, Bass defeated Kuster by just 3,550 votes – 48% to 47%.

2012

Bass ran for re-election in 2012, winning the Republican primary with 81% of the vote. Dennis Lamare came second with 9%, Will Dean came third with 4%, Miroslaw Dziedzic came fourth with 3% and Gerard Beloin came fifth with 2%. In the general election, Bass faced a rematch with Ann McLane Kuster. Early polling predicted another tight race but by September, Kuster had opened up a lead, which she did not relinquish for the rest of the race. On November 6, Bass lost to Kuster by 50% to 45%.

=== Tenure (1995–2007; 2011–2013) ===
Bass was elected to Congress in 1994, where he served for twelve years. As part of the 1994 Republican Revolution, he signed Newt Gingrich's Contract With America.

Bass was among the first and most vocal congressmen to demand that Tom DeLay step aside as House Majority Leader in 2005 and led the petition that resulted in DeLay's removal from House leadership.

Bass is a member of the Republican Majority For Choice, Republicans For Choice PAC, and Republicans for Environmental Protection. He is a director and former head of The Republican Main Street Partnership, a coalition of centrist Republicans.

Abortion

Bass believes that abortion should be legal and supported the Supreme Court decision, Roe v. Wade. He receives strong ratings from pro-choice interest groups and relatively low ratings from anti-abortion groups. In 2005, NARAL Pro-Choice America reported that his voting record aligned with the group's interests 100% of the time, and in 2006, Planned Parenthood reported an 82% rating for the same statistic. From 2003 to 2004, the National Right to Life Committee reported that he supported the group's interests in 27% of his votes.

Although Bass supports the continued legalization of abortion, he does not support federal funding for abortion, or the legalization of partial-birth abortions. In 2010, he stated, "I support the Roe v. Wade Supreme Court decision; however, I oppose federal funding of abortions (Hyde Amendment) and support banning of so-called partial-birth abortions." He consistently voted for bills banning the practice of late term or partial- birth abortion, including H.R. 3660 [106th]: Partial-Birth Abortion Ban Act of 2000 and H.R. 760 [108th]: Partial-Birth Abortion Ban Act of 2003.

Environment

Bass supports environmental protection regulations and alternative energy sources. He voted against Republican amendments of the FY 2011 spending bill, which would defund many environmental protection measures, such as the modification of the National Ambient Air Quality Standards (NAAQS), the designation of fossil fuel combustion waste as hazardous material, and the enforcement of mining regulations from the EPA. He states on his official website that he supports the promotion of "clean, alternative energies that will lessen our dependence on foreign sources of oil," a position he has upheld by voting for the Energy Policy Act of 2005, which appropriates large amounts of funding for the pursuit of renewable energy. He defines his position on climate change, stating, "The overwhelming scientific evidence points to the existence of global climate change."

Publicly Administered Health Insurance

Although Congressman Bass recognizes a need for health care reform, he opposes the Patient Protection and Affordable Care Act (PPACA) and supports its repeal. He believes that the act will saddle "future generations of Americans with mountains of unsustainable debt" and, instead, advocates creating an interstate health insurance market to increase competition and form a larger risk pool. Congressman Bass voted for H.R. 1217 – To repeal the Prevention and Public Health Fund in 2011, a bill that would end funding to the Prevention and Public Health Fund of the Patient Protection and Affordable Care Act.

Gay Rights

After losing re-election in 2012, Bass came out in favor of same-sex marriage as a signatory to an amicus curiae brief submitted to the Supreme Court during the Hollingsworth v. Perry case.

=== Committee assignments ===
- Committee on Energy and Commerce
  - Subcommittee on Commerce, Manufacturing and Trade
  - Subcommittee on Communications and Technology
  - Subcommittee on Environment and Economy
- Committee on the Budget

=== Caucus memberships ===
- Congressional Arts Caucus
- Congressional Biomass Caucus (co-chair)
- Bipartisan Medical Technology Caucus
- Congressional Fire Services Caucus
- Congressional Law Enforcement Caucus
- Congressional Rural Caucus
- Congressional Sportsmen's Caucus
- Congressional Travel and Tourism Caucus
- General Aviation Caucus
- House Renewable Energy and Energy Efficiency Caucus
- House Republican Cyber-Security Team
- The New England Congressional Caucus (co-chair)
- Northeast Agriculture Caucus
- Rural Health Care Caucus, Steering Committee

== Inter-congressional career (2007–2009) ==
Bass is a business consultant to renewable energy companies. He has been on the Board of Managers of New England Wood Pellet, a producer of clean burning wood pellets, located in Jaffrey, New Hampshire, since January 2007.

In March 2006, the company publicly credited Bass with setting up a February 2006 meeting in New Hampshire between its president, Steven Walker, and Secretary of Energy Samuel Bodman. In March 2007, Bass reported on his financial disclosure statement that he had bought shares in the company in January and November 2006. But in October 2010 he said that his initial purchase had been in January 2007, after he left office.

In 2009, Bass joined the board of directors of Laidlaw Biopower, LLC, a developer of biomass power plants in the northeastern United States.

== Post-congressional career (2013–present) ==
Bass considered challenging Democratic incumbent Jeanne Shaheen in the 2014 Senate election but decided against it. For the 2016 presidential election, he endorsed his friend and former colleague, Ohio governor John Kasich for the Republican nomination.

Bass is a member of the ReFormers Caucus of Issue One.

After the January 6th insurrection, Bass, along with 30 other former Republican members of Congress urged their former colleagues to pass articles of impeachment against outgoing President Donald Trump.

== Electoral history ==
New Hampshire's 2nd congressional district: Results 1996–2006; 2010–2012
Year	Republican	Votes	Pct	Democratic	Votes	Pct	3rd Party	Party	Votes	Pct	3rd Party	Party	Votes	Pct
1994	Charlie Bass	83,121	51.44	Richard Swett	74,243	45.95	John Lewicke	Libertarian	2,986	1.85	Linda Spitzfaden	Natural Law	1,223	0.76
1996	Charles Bass	123,001	50.50	Arnie Arnesen	105,867	43.46	Carole Lamirande	Independent	10,757	4.42				
1998	Charles Bass	85,740	53.13	Mary Rauh	72,217	44.75	Paula Werme	Libertarian	3,338	2.07				
2000	Charles Bass	152,581	56.19	Barney Brannen	110,367	40.64	Brian Christeson	Libertarian	3,338	2.07	Roy Kendel	Constitution	2,204	0.81
2002	Charles Bass	125,804	56.81	Katrina Swett	90,479	40.86	Rosalie Babiarz	Libertarian	5,051	2.28				
2004	Charles Bass	191,188	58.25	Paul Hodes	125,280	38.17	Richard Kahn	Libertarian	11,311	3.45				
2006	Charles Bass	94,012	45.61	Paul Hodes	108,634	52.71	Ken Blevens	Libertarian	3,305	1.60				
2010	Charles Bass	108,610	48.34	Ann McLane Kuster	105,060	46.76	Tim vanBlommesteyn	Independent	6,197	2.76	Howard L. Wilson	Libertarian	4,796	2.13
2012	Charles Bass	152,977	45.34	Ann McLane Kuster	169,275	50.17	Hardy Macia	Libertarian	14,936	4.43				

== Personal life ==
Bass currently resides in Peterborough, New Hampshire. He is an Episcopalian.

U.S. House of Representatives
Preceded by Richard Swett	Member of the U.S. House of Representatives from New Hampshire's 2nd congressional district 1995–2007	Succeeded by Paul Hodes
Preceded by Paul Hodes	Member of the U.S. House of Representatives from New Hampshire's 2nd congressional district 2011–2013	Succeeded by Ann Kuster
Party political offices
Preceded by Mike Castle; Nancy Johnson; Fred Upton	Chair of the Tuesday Group; 2005–2007; Served alongside: Mark Kirk	Succeeded by Charlie Dent
U.S. order of precedence (ceremonial)
Preceded by Jeff Duncan as Former U.S. Representative	Order of precedence of the United States as Former U.S. Representative	Succeeded by Bob Etheridge as Former U.S. Representative
