= 2012 United States House of Representatives elections in New Hampshire =

- November 6, 2012

All 2 New Hampshire seats to the United States House of Representatives
	Majority party	Minority party
Party	Democratic	Republican
Last election	0	2
Seats won	2	0
Seat change	▲2	▼2
Popular vote	340,925	311,636
Percentage	49.96%	45.66%
Swing	▲5.37%	▼5.53%

Democratic
40–50%
50–60%
60–70%
70–80%
90–100%
Republican
40–50%
50–60%
60–70%
70–80%
90–100%
Tie
40–50%
50%

The 2012 United States House of Representatives elections in New Hampshire were held on Tuesday, November 6, 2012, to elect the two U.S. representatives from the state of New Hampshire. The elections coincided with the elections of other federal and state offices, including a quadrennial presidential election.

== Overview ==
United States House of Representatives elections in New Hampshire, 2012
Party	Votes	Percentage	Seats	+/–
Democratic	340,925	49.96%	2	+2
Republican	311,636	45.66%	0	-2
Libertarian	29,457	4.32%	0	—
Scattering	398	0.06%	0	—
Totals	682,416	100.00%	2	—

== District 1 ==
2012 New Hampshire's 1st congressional district election
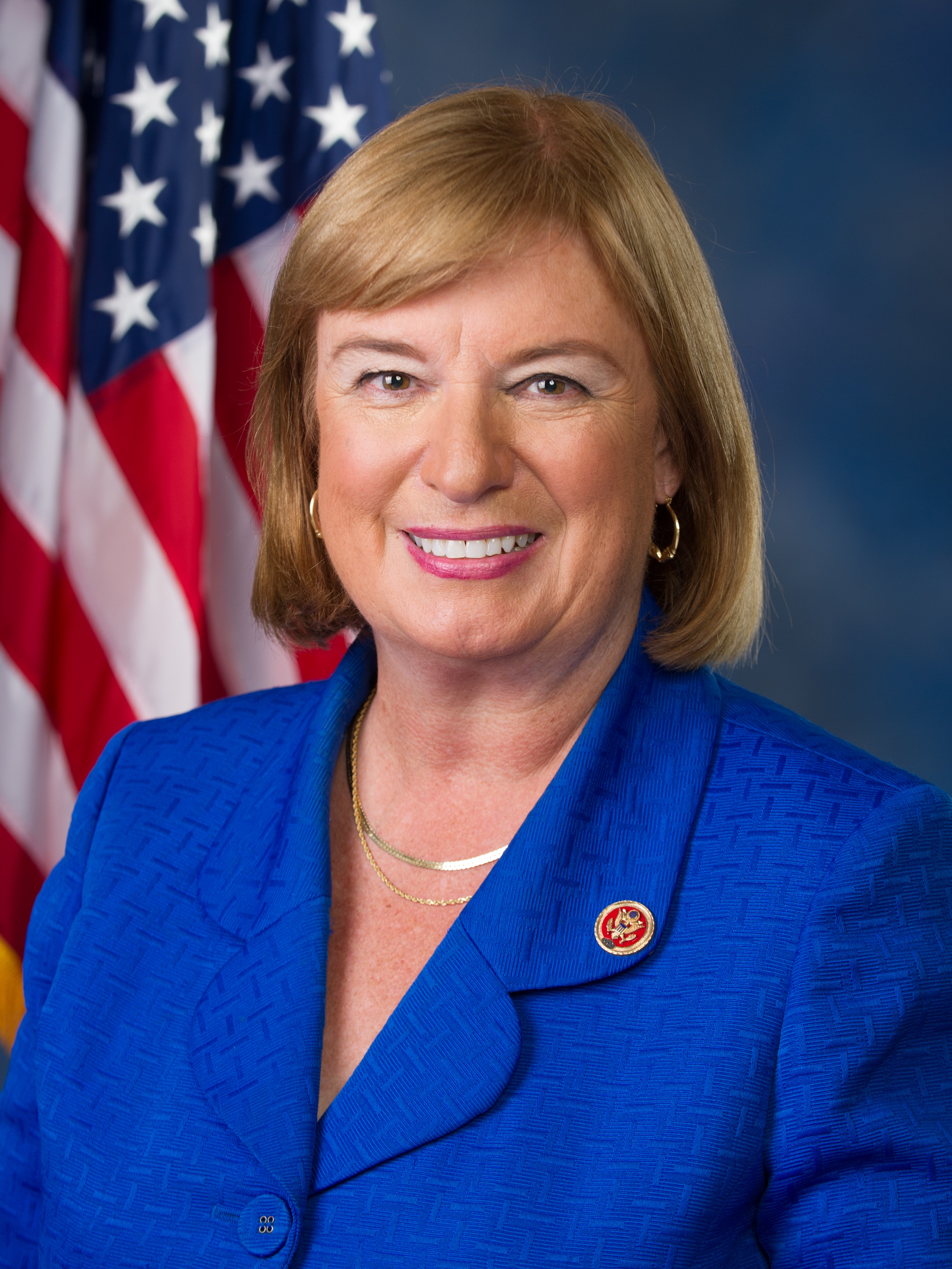

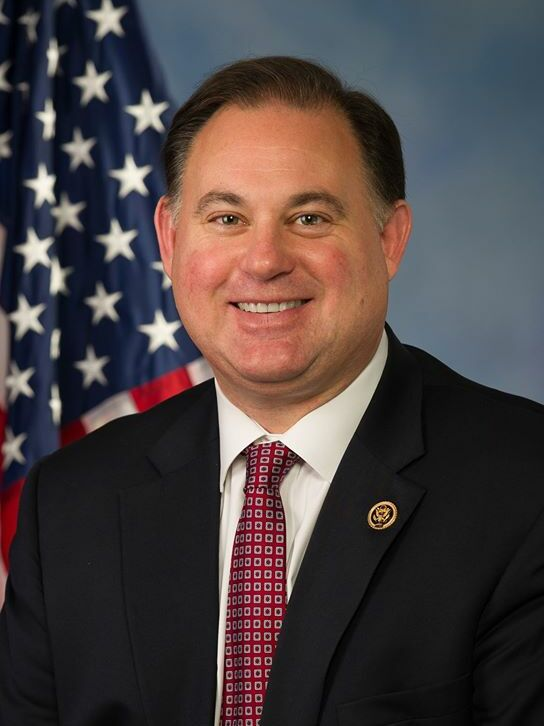
Nominee	Carol Shea-Porter	Frank Guinta
Party	Democratic	Republican
Popular vote	171,650	158,659
Percentage	49.7%	46.0%
- Municipality results Shea-Porter: 40–50% 50–60% 60–70% Guinta: 40–50% 50–60% 60–70% 70–80%
U.S. Representative before election
Frank Guinta
Republican
Elected U.S. Representative
Carol Shea-Porter
Democratic

The redrawn 1st district currently represents all municipalities in Belknap (except for the town of Center Harbor); the entirety of Carroll, and Strafford counties; all of Rockingham County; the municipalities of Bedford, Goffstown, Manchester, and Merrimack in Hillsborough County; the town of Campton in Grafton County; and the town of Hooksett in Merrimack County.

Republican Frank Guinta, who had represented the 1st district since January 2011, ran for re-election.

=== Republican primary ===
==== Candidates ====
===== Nominee =====
- Frank Guinta, incumbent U.S. representative

===== Eliminated in primary =====
- Vern Clough, retired barber
- Rick Parent, candidate for this seat in 2010

==== Primary results ====
Republican primary results
Party	Candidate	Votes	%
Republican	Frank Guinta (incumbent)	46,979	84.4
Republican	Rick Parent	6,923	12.4
Republican	Vern Clough	1,639	3.0
Republican	Write-ins	130	0.2
Total votes		55,671	100.0

=== Democratic primary ===
==== Candidates ====
===== Nominee =====
- Carol Shea-Porter, former U.S. Representative

===== Withdrawn =====
- Joanne Dowdell, businesswoman and Democratic National Committeewoman
- Matthew Hancock, software developer
- Andrew Hosmer, businessman

==== Primary results ====
Democratic primary results
Party	Candidate	Votes	%
Democratic	Carol Shea-Porter	38,623	99.1
Democratic	Write-ins	358	0.9
Total votes		38,981	100.0

=== Libertarian primary ===
Brendan Kelly, the chairman of the Seabrook Board of Selectmen, ran as a Libertarian.

=== General election ===
==== Endorsements ====
Frank Guinta (R)

Organizations

- GOProud
- National Republican Congressional Committee "Patriot" Program
Carol Shea-Porter (D)

Organizations

- Democratic Congressional Campaign Committee "Red to Blue" Program
- EMILY's List
- Progressive Change Campaign Committee

==== Debates ====
2012 New Hampshire's 1st congressional district debates
No.	Date	Host	Moderator	Link	Republican	Democratic
Key: P Participant A Absent N Not invited I Invited W Withdrawn						
Key: P Participant A Absent N Not invited I Invited W Withdrawn					Frank Guinta	Carol Shea-Porter
1	Sep. 17, 2012	New Hampshire PBS	Laura Knoy		P	P
2	Oct. 9, 2012	AARP; WBIN-TV	Charlie Sherman		P	P

==== Polling ====
Poll source	Date(s) administered	Sample size	Margin of error	Frank Guinta (R)	Carol Shea-Porter (D)	Other	Undecided
WMUR/University of New Hampshire	November 1–4, 2012	366	± 5.1%	46%	49%	5%	—
New England College	October 29–31, 2012	511	± 4.3%	48%	41%	2%	9%
University of New Hampshire	October 17–21, 2012	364	± 5.1%	41%	38%	4%	17%
WMUR/University of New Hampshire	September 30 - October 6, 2012	200	± 6.9%	45%	35%	3%	17%
WMUR/University of New Hampshire	September 27–30, 2012	273	± 5.9%	35%	46%	–	18%
Public Policy Polling	September 24–25, 2012	401	± 4.9%	47%	48%	–	4%
WMUR/University of New Hampshire	August 1–12, 2012	258	± 6.1%	43%	45%	–	12%
Public Policy Polling	May 10–13, 2012	502	± 4.4%	43%	47%	–	10%
WMUR/University of New Hampshire	April 9–20, 2012	230	± 6.5%	39%	44%	1%	16%
Pulse Opinion Research LLC	January 2012	500	± 4.5%	41%	41%	7%	10%
Public Policy Polling	June 30-July 5, 2011	299	± 5.7%	48%	41%	–	10%

==== Predictions ====
Source	Ranking	As of
The Cook Political Report	Tossup	November 5, 2012
Rothenberg	Tossup	November 2, 2012
Roll Call	Tossup	November 4, 2012
Sabato's Crystal Ball	Lean R	November 5, 2012
NY Times	Lean R	November 4, 2012
RCP	Tossup	November 4, 2012
The Hill	Tossup	November 4, 2012

==== Results ====
New Hampshire's 1st congressional district, 2012
Party	Candidate	Votes	%
Democratic	Carol Shea-Porter	171,650	49.7
Republican	Frank Guinta (incumbent)	158,659	46.0
Libertarian	Brendan Kelly	14,521	4.2
n/a	Write-ins	192	0.1
Total votes		345,022	100.0
Democratic gain from Republican			

== District 2 ==
2012 New Hampshire's 2nd congressional district election
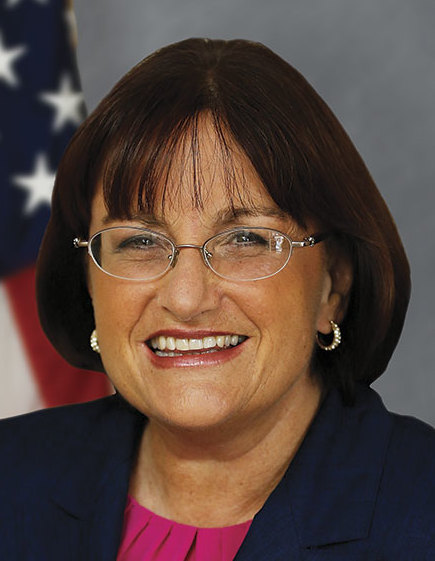

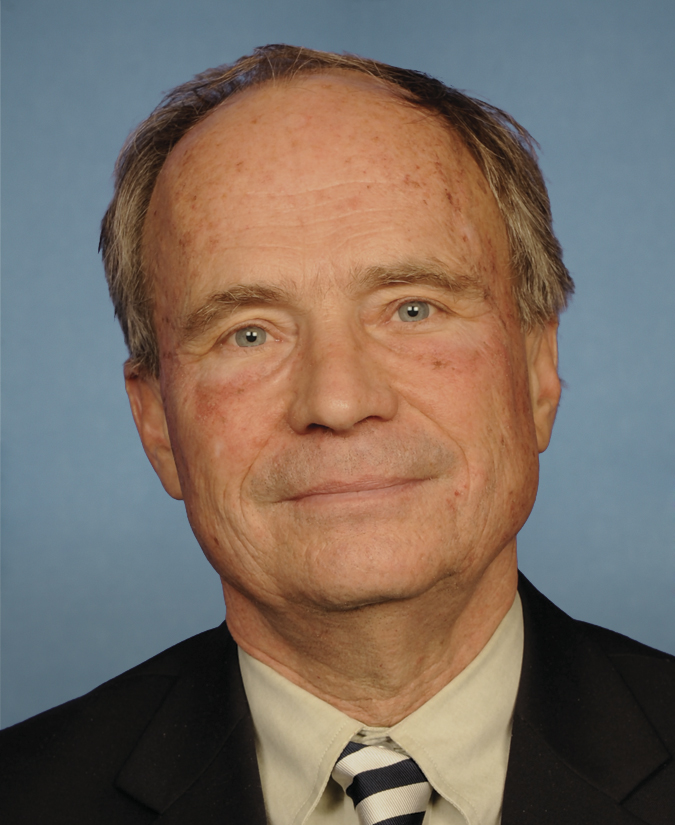
Nominee	Ann McLane Kuster	Charles Bass
Party	Democratic	Republican
Popular vote	169,275	152,977
Percentage	50.2%	45.3%
- Municipality results Kuster: 40–50% 50–60% 60–70% 70–80% 90–100% Bass: 40–50% 50–60% 60–70% 70–80% 90–100% Tie (40–50%) Tie (50%) No votes
U.S. Representative before election
Charles Bass
Republican
Elected U.S. Representative
Ann McLane Kuster
Democratic

The redrawn 2nd district will represent all of Cheshire, Coos, Grafton (except for the town of Campton), Merrimack (except for the town of Hooksett), and Sullivan counties; most of Hillsborough County; the towns of Atkinson, Deerfield, Northwood, Salem, and Windham in Rockingham County; and the town of Center Harbor in Belknap County.

Republican Charles Bass, who had represented the 2nd district from 1995 to 2007, and since 2011, ran for re-election. Bass won by just 1% in 2010.

=== Republican primary ===
==== Candidates ====
===== Nominee =====
- Charles Bass, incumbent U.S. representative

===== Eliminated in primary =====
- Gerald Beloin
- Will Dean
- Miroslaw Dziedzic
- Dennis Lamare, insurance agent and candidate for Senate in 2010

==== Primary results ====
Republican primary results
Party	Candidate	Votes	%
Republican	Charles Bass (incumbent)	39,605	81.2
Republican	Dennis Lamare	4,263	8.8
Republican	Will Dean	2,129	4.4
Republican	Miroslaw Dziedzic	1,310	2.7
Republican	Gerard Beloin	1,127	2.3
Republican	Write-ins	316	0.6
Total votes		48,750	100.0

=== Democratic primary ===
==== Candidates ====
===== Nominee =====
- Ann McLane Kuster, attorney and nominee for this seat in 2010

==== Primary results ====
Democratic primary results
Party	Candidate	Votes	%
Democratic	Anne McLane Kuster	40,627	99.2
Democratic	Write-ins	337	0.8
Total votes		40,964	100.0

=== Libertarian primary ===
Hardy Macia, owner of an iPhone/Android app development company, ran as a Libertarian.

=== General election ===
==== Endorsements ====
Charlie Bass (R)

Organizations

- GOProud
- National Republican Congressional Committee "Patriot" Program
Anne McLane Kuster (D)

Organizations

- Democratic Congressional Campaign Committee "Red to Blue" Program
- EMILY's List
- Progressive Change Campaign Committee

==== Debates ====
2012 New Hampshire's 2nd congressional district debates
No.	Date	Host	Moderator	Link	Republican	Democratic
Key: P Participant A Absent N Not invited I Invited W Withdrawn						
Key: P Participant A Absent N Not invited I Invited W Withdrawn					Charles Bass	Ann McLane Kuster
1	Sep. 19, 2012	New Hampshire PBS	Laura Knoy		P	P
2	Oct. 10, 2012	AARP; WBIN-TV	Charlie Sherman		P	P

==== Polling ====
Poll source	Date(s) administered	Sample size	Margin of error	Charlie Bass (R)	Ann Kuster (D)	Other	Undecided
WMUR/University of New Hampshire	November 1–4, 2012	423	± 4.8%	43%	53%	4%	—
New England College	October 29–31, 2012	511	± 4.33%	41%	47%	1%	11%
University of New Hampshire	October 17–21, 2012	408	± 4.9%	36%	39%	3%	22%
WMUR/University of New Hampshire	September 30 – October 6, 2012	211	± 6.7%	35%	38%	3%	25%
WMUR/University of New Hampshire	September 27–30, 2012	325	± 5.4%	34%	36%	2%	28%
Public Policy Polling	September 24–25, 2012	461	± 4.6%	45%	51%	–	4%
WMUR/University of New Hampshire	August 1–12, 2012	284	± 5.8%	42%	37%	–	21%
Public Policy Polling	May 10–13, 2012	642	± 3.9%	42%	42%	–	15%
WMUR/University of New Hampshire	April 9–20, 2012	251	± 6.2%	39%	40%	1%	20%
Pulse Opinion Research LLC	January 2012	500	± 4.5%	39%	35%	14%	13%
Public Policy Polling	June 30 – July 5, 2011	363	± 5.1%	43%	42%	–	15%

==== Predictions ====
Source	Ranking	As of
The Cook Political Report	Lean D (flip)	November 5, 2012
Rothenberg	Tossup	November 2, 2012
Roll Call	Tossup	November 4, 2012
Sabato's Crystal Ball	Lean D (flip)	November 5, 2012
NY Times	Tossup	November 4, 2012
RCP	Lean D (flip)	November 4, 2012
The Hill	Lean D (flip)	November 4, 2012

==== Results ====
New Hampshire's 2nd congressional district, 2012
Party	Candidate	Votes	%
Democratic	Ann McLane Kuster	169,275	50.2
Republican	Charles Bass (incumbent)	152,977	45.3
Libertarian	Hardy Macia	14,936	4.4
n/a	Write-ins	206	0.1
Total votes		337,394	100.0
Democratic gain from Republican			
