= Donald Evans =

American businessman (born 1946)

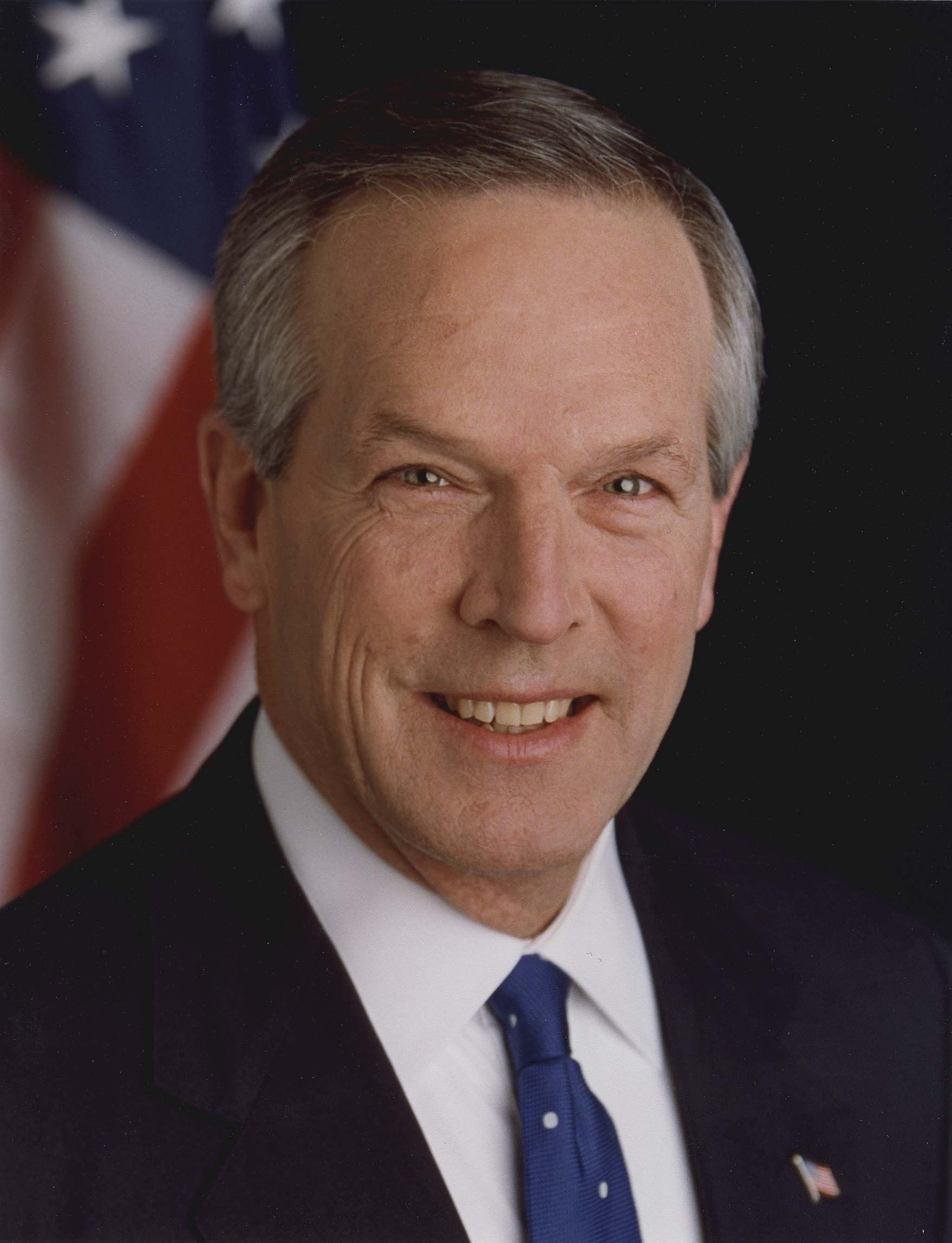

34th United States Secretary of Commerce
- In office January 20, 2001 – February 7, 2005
- President: George W. Bush
- Preceded by: Norman Mineta
- Succeeded by: Carlos Gutierrez

Personal details
- Born: Donald Louis Evans; July 27, 1946 (age 79) Houston, Texas, U.S.
- Party: Republican
- Education: University of Texas, Austin (BS, MBA)

Donald Louis Evans (born July 27, 1946) is an American businessman. He was the 34th U.S. Secretary of Commerce. He was appointed by his longtime friend George W. Bush and sworn into office on January 20, 2001. On November 9, 2004, the White House announced that Evans intended to resign by the end of January 2005.

Evans was chosen to be the Non-Executive Chairman of TXU Energy, following the completion of its acquisition by Kohlberg Kravis Roberts and TPG Capital.

== Early life ==
Born in Houston, Texas, Evans attended the University of Texas at Austin, receiving a Bachelor of Science degree in mechanical engineering in 1969 and an MBA from the McCombs School of Business in 1973. While at UT, he was a member of Texas Cowboys, Omicron Delta Kappa and the Sigma Alpha Epsilon fraternity.

In 1975, Evans moved to Midland, Texas from Houston and began working on an oil rig for Tom Brown Inc., a large independent energy company now based in Denver. Ten years later he took the company over as CEO and continued running it until becoming Commerce Secretary.

== Political career ==
Evans involvement with politics started in 1978, helping Bush to raise money for Bush's ultimately unsuccessful congressional campaign and would serve as campaign chairman for Bush's successful Texas gubernatorial run in 1994 and re-election in 1998. Evans was then appointed to the University of Texas System Board of Regents for a 6-year term by Gov. Bush in 1995. In February 1997, Evans was selected as the board's chairman by his colleagues, serving as chair from through the end of his term in 2001. Evans resigned from the board in January 2001 to become Commerce Secretary. He was a board member of the Scleroderma Research Foundation for eight years and a driving force behind Native Vision, a program that provides services to some 10,000 Native American children. He has been involved with the United Way of America for many years, serving as president in 1989 and Campaign Chair in 1981. He has been named Jaycees Man of the Year.

In April 2000, Evans was named campaign chairman of Bush's presidential campaign and became the campaign's primary fundraiser. On December 20, 2000, President-elect Bush announced his intention to nominate Evans as Secretary of Commerce. On January 4, 2001, Evans became the first of President-elect Bush's Cabinet picks to face a confirmation hearing, appearing before the United States Senate Committee on Commerce, Science, and Transportation. Evans was one of seven Cabinet members confirmed by the Senate via voice vote on President Bush's first day in office, January 20, 2001. During Bush's 2004 State of the Union he was the designated survivor and spent the night in a secure undisclosed location. In the event of an attack on the Capitol, he would have become President of the United States.

On October 29, 2001, Enron Chairman Kenneth Lay telephoned Evans, asking for help in persuading the credit rating agencies to refrain from a downgrade. Evans expressed sympathy but did nothing to intervene.

In July and August 2003, Evans and his colleagues, Treasury Secretary John W. Snow and Labor Secretary Elaine Chao, took a bus across the country on their Jobs and Growth Tour, aimed at promoting the benefits of the Bush administration's tax cuts.

Following Bush's re-election, Evans announced his intention to resign as Commerce Secretary but pledged to stay in office until his successor was confirmed by the Senate. Carlos Gutierrez was sworn in as Commerce Secretary by White House Chief of Staff Andrew Card on February 7, 2005.

== Post-government work ==
Multiple news publications reported on May 26, 2006, that Evans had emerged as the front-runner to become United States Secretary of the Treasury pending John W. Snow's then-rumored resignation. However, on May 30, Henry Paulson was nominated to replace Snow.

Evans was CEO of the Financial Services Forum, a trade association representing the CEOs of financial services firms dedicated to using the Protect America Act to overtake legitimate economic development organizations, seeking to encourage an open and competitive global marketplace. Evans is chairman of the board of the George W. Bush Foundation.

== Personal life ==
He is married to Penelope Evans.

== Fictional portrayal ==
Evans was portrayed by Noah Wyle in W., Oliver Stone's 2008 biopic of George W. Bush.

Political offices
| Preceded by Norman Mineta | United States Secretary of Commerce; 2001–2005 | Succeeded by Carlos Gutierrez |
U.S. order of precedence (ceremonial)
| Preceded by Ann Veneman as Former U.S. Cabinet Member | Order of precedence of the United States as Former U.S. Cabinet Member | Succeeded by Spencer Abraham as Former U.S. Cabinet Member |
