= Arnold G. Langbo =

American businessman (1937–2021)

- Born: 1937; Richmond, British Columbia
- Died: October 16, 2021 (age 84)
- Education: University of British Columbia
- Occupation: Business Executive
- Employer: Kellogg’s Company
- Known for: Former Kellogg's Company chair and CEO
- Title: Company director
- Predecessor: William E. Lamothe
- Successor: Carlos Gutierrez
- Board member of: Kellogg’s, Johnson & Johnson, Weyerhaeuser, The Hershey Company, Whirlpool Corporation, International Youth Foundation, America’s Promise
- Children: Sharon, Maureen, Sue, Rod, Bob, Gary, Craig, Keith

Arnold G. Langbo (1937–2021) was an American businessman. He is the former chairman and chief executive officer of the Kellogg's Company and served on the board of directors for Johnson & Johnson, the Weyerhaeuser Company, the Whirlpool Corporation, The Hershey Company, the International Youth Foundation, and America's Promise. He was a co-trustee of the W. K. Kellogg Foundation.

== Early life ==
Arnold Langbo was born in 1937 to Oscar and Laura Langbo. He grew up outside of Vancouver, Canada with two siblings. He married his wife, Martha, in 1959. He studied violin performance at the University of British Columbia.

== Career ==
Mr. Langbo joined the Kellogg Company as a Sales Representative in 1956. He served in a variety of roles, eventually working his way into the role of president and chief executive officer of Kellogg Salada Canada, Ltd. Inc in 1976. He was then assigned to the role of President of the Kellogg's US Food Products division in 1978. In 1989, he became chairman and chief executive officer of Mrs. Smith's Frozen Foods, Co., as well as the president of Kellogg International. He was elected president and chief executive officer, as well as director, of the Kellogg Company in 1990. Under his leadership, Kellogg expanded its international presence by opening plants in various new markets. In 1993, Kellogg opened a plant in Rigva, Latvia. In 1994, Kellogg opened a plant in Taloja, India. Later, in 1995, Kellogg opened an additional plant in Guangzhou, China. Such expansions brought Kelloggs to consumers in greater than 160 different countries.

In April 1999, Mr. Langbo was succeeded as CEO by Carlos Gutierrez; however he stayed in his role as chairman of Kellogg until April 2000.

Langbo has served on the board of directors of Johnson & Johnson, the Weyerhaeuser Company, the Whirlpool Corporation, The Hershey Company, the International Youth Foundation, and America's Promise. Mr. Langbo also served as an Honorary Trustee of Albion College.

== Personal life ==
During his corporate years at Kellogg, Mr. Langbo resided in Battle Creek, Michigan. Following his retirement from the Kellogg Company, Mr. Langbo resided in Stowe, Vermont, where he served on the Diocesan Administrative Board of the Roman Catholic Diocese of Burlington. He was a fervent proponent of catholic education, and particularly the Bishop John A. Marshall School, in Morrisville, Vermont. Along with his wife, Martha, he raised eight children.
