= Daniel M. Burnham =

American politician

Member of the New Hampshire House of Representatives from the Cheshire 5th district
- In office 1990–1992

Member of the New Hampshire House of Representatives from the Cheshire 8th district
- In office 1994–1998
- In office 2000–2002

Personal details
- Born: Daniel McFarland Burnham; August 1, 1929 Brooklyn, New York, U.S.
- Died: July 18, 2020 (aged 90) Dublin, New Hampshire, U.S.
- Party: Democratic
- Education: Harvard College

Daniel McFarland Burnham (August 1, 1929 – July 18, 2020) was an American politician. A member of the Democratic Party, he served in the New Hampshire House of Representatives from 1990 to 1992, from 1994 to 1998 and from 2000 to 2002.

== Life and career ==
Burnham was born in Brooklyn, New York, the son of Addison and Dorothy Burnham. He served in the United States Army, which after his discharge, he attended Harvard College, graduating in 1952. After graduating, he worked as a writer for the military newspaper Stars and Stripes.

In 1988, Burnham ran as a Democratic candidate for New Hampshire state senator from the 11th district. He received 7,887 votes, but lost to Republican candidate Charles Bass, who won with 11,953 votes.

Burnham served in the New Hampshire House of Representatives from 1990 to 1992, from 1994 to 1998 and from 2000 to 2002.

== Death ==
Burnham died on July 18, 2020, at his home in Dublin, New Hampshire, at the age of 90.
