= James P. Bassett =

American judge (born 1956)

James Bassett

Associate Justice of the New Hampshire Supreme Court
- In office July 19, 2012 – August 31, 2025
- Appointed by: John Lynch
- Preceded by: James Duggan
- Succeeded by: Bryan Gould

Personal details
- Born: September 16, 1956 (age 69)
- Political party: Republican
- Education: Dartmouth College (BA); University of Virginia (JD); Duke University (LLM)

James P. Bassett (born September 16, 1956) is a former justice of the New Hampshire Supreme Court. He graduated from the University of Virginia Law School. He was a candidate for the Republican nomination for New Hampshire's 2nd congressional district in 1994, coming fourth with 14% of the vote.

Legal offices
Preceded by James Duggan	Associate Justice of the New Hampshire Supreme Court; 2012–2025	Succeeded by Bryan Gould
