= Stuart A. Bernstein =

American diplomat and businessman

Bernstein in 2023

Stuart A. Bernstein (born April 9, 1938, Washington, D.C.) is an American businessman who served as US ambassador to Denmark from 2001 until 2005. He is Chairman Emeritus off the Bernstein Companies.

Bernstein's professional background is in real estate development and investment, particularly in the Mid-Atlantic region of the United States.

President George H. W. Bush appointed him Commissioner of the International Cultural and Trade Center in 1991 and Trustee of the John F. Kennedy Center for the Performing Arts in 1992. He served at the JFK Center until he was appointed Ambassador.

== Biography ==
Bernstein grew up in the Shepherd Park neighborhood of Washington. He attended Western High School (now the Duke Ellington School of the Arts), Milford Prep School in Milford, Connecticut and the Michigan State University for a year.

Bernstein graduated from American University and served on their board of trustees.
