= Katrina Swett =

American politician

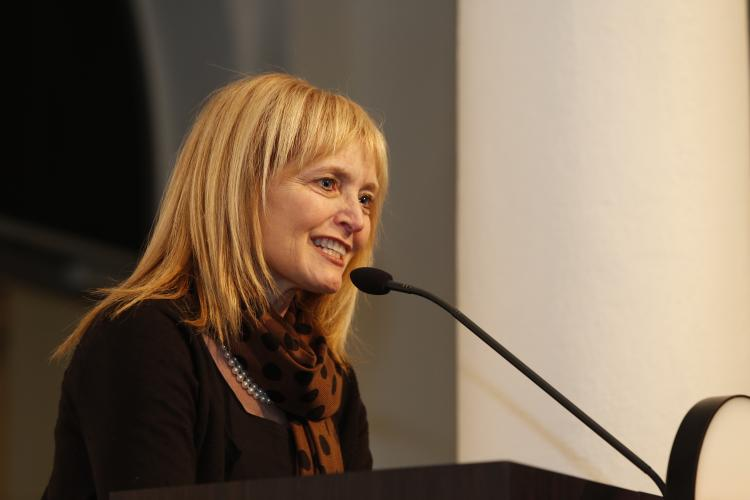
- Born: Yvonne Katrina Lantos; October 8, 1955 (age 71); San Francisco, California, U.S.
- Education: Yale University (BA); University of California, Hastings (JD); University of Southern Denmark (PhD)
- Political party: Democratic
- Spouse: Dick Swett (m. 1980)
- Children: 7
- Parent: Tom Lantos

Yvonne Katrina Swett (née Lantos; born October 8, 1955) is an American educator. She was chair of the U.S. Commission on International Religious Freedom from 2012 to 2013, and then in 2014 to 2015. She ran unsuccessfully as the Democratic candidate for Congress in New Hampshire's 2nd congressional district, which is the same district that her husband Richard Swett occupied, during the 2002 United States midterm elections. Afterwards, she became the president of the Lantos Foundation.

== Early life, education and career ==
Born in San Francisco, Swett is a first-generation American. Her father, the congressman Tom Lantos (D-CA), a survivor of the Holocaust, and her mother, Annette Tillemann Lantos, came to the United States from Hungary after World War II. Katrina Swett has a sister, Annette.

She skipped high school, entered college at 14, and transferred to Yale where her older sister Annette was a student. She earned a degree in political science there in 1974 at 18, and her Juris Doctor in 1976 from the University of California, Hastings College of Law. At 21, she joined the staff of then U.S. Senator Joe Biden's Senate Judiciary Committee. In 2006, she earned her Ph.D. in history with a focus on Human Rights and United States Foreign Policy from the University of Southern Denmark.

Swett is married to Ambassador and former Congressman Richard Swett, vice president of Swett Associates, Inc., a consulting firm. Swett met Richard Swett at Yale, where she became a member of the Church of Jesus Christ of Latter-day Saints, largely through her interactions with Jeffrey R. Holland. Katrina and Richard married in 1980. The couple have seven children and live in Bow, New Hampshire.

== Awards ==
In 2009, Swett was awarded the Knight's Cross of the Order of Merit of the Republic of Hungary for her efforts in setting up the Tom Lantos Institute in Budapest, continuing her late father's work for the benefit of ethnic minorities there. In 2016, in the company of at least 100 other recipients of Hungarian state awards, Swett returned the Knight's Cross in protest of the Hungarian government's commendation of Zsolt Bayer, a writer, publisher, public speaker, and member of the Fidesz party for his rhetoric, what she considers antisemitic, anti-Muslim, and antiziganist.

In 2016, the International Center for Law and Religion Studies and J. Reuben Clark Law School of Brigham Young University presented Swett the International Religious Liberty Award in recognition of her outstanding contributions to the promotion and preservation of religious freedom.

== Political career ==
Swett ran two of her father's campaigns for Congress. She was a Congressional staffer, first as a legislative assistant and then as Deputy Counsel to the Criminal Justice Subcommittee of the Senate Judiciary Committee.

She co-hosted a political talk show, Beyond Politics on WMUR-TV Channel 9 with former Assistant Secretary of State Elizabeth Tamposi. She ran in 2002 against Republican incumbent U.S. Representative Charles Bass and received less than 41% of vote, losing by 16%.

Swett was national co-chair of Joe Lieberman's 2004 presidential race. She accused General Wesley Clark of apostasy on the AUMF in the Iraq War of 2003, and for having linked Al-Qaeda with Iraq. In 2006, she supported Lieberman's successful 2006 re-election campaign as an Independent against Democrat Ned Lamont and Republican nominee Alan Schlesinger.

=== 2002 U.S. House of Representatives campaign ===
She ran for Congress in 2002, unsuccessfully attempting to recapture the seat previously held by her husband. General Wesley Clark endorsed her; he had known the Swetts when he was SACEUR and they lived in Denmark. She received financial support from her parents, Nancy Pelosi, John and Lisa Pritzker, a San Francisco Supervisor and her husband, Warren Hellman, Herbert Sandler and Marion Sandler, Steven Spielberg, Kate Capshaw, David Geffen, and other Californians.

=== 2008 U.S. Senate campaign ===
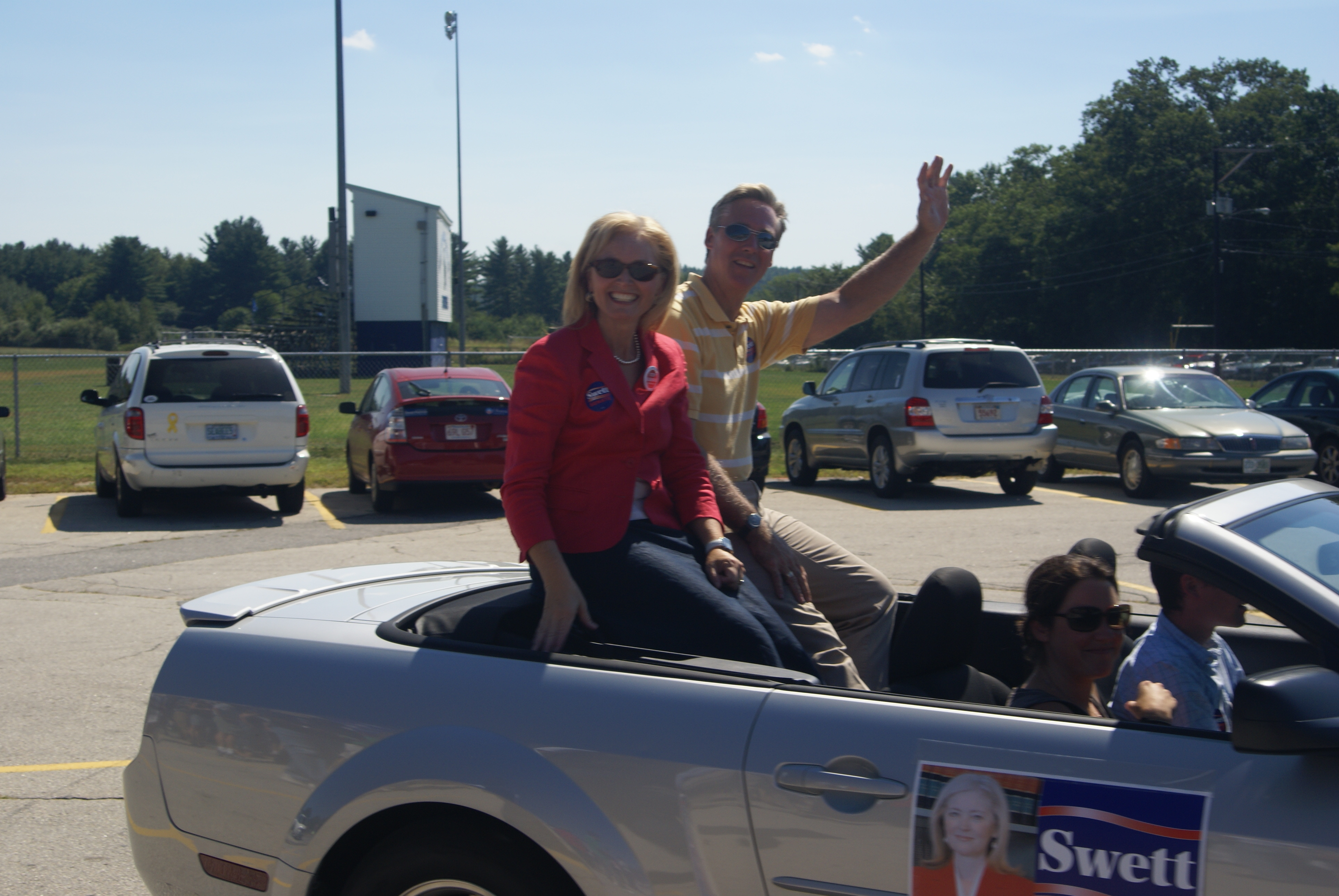
Katrina and Dick Swett, at 2008 Milford Labor Day parade

On January 18, 2007, Katrina Swett announced her candidacy for the U.S. Senate in the 2008 elections in New Hampshire, in hopes of being the Democratic nominee to unseat incumbent Republican John E. Sununu. She began fundraising for the 2008 Senate campaign. After former Governor and 2002 nominee Jeanne Shaheen announced her candidacy, Swett withdrew and endorsed Shaheen, who later won the election.

=== 2010 U.S. House of Representatives campaign ===
On January 14, 2010, Katrina Swett announced her candidacy for the Democratic Primary for Congress in New Hampshire's 2nd congressional district in the 2010 elections. Her more left-leaning opponent, Ann McLane Kuster, won the primary election, but Kuster lost in the general election to her Republican opponent, Charles Bass.

Ann Kuster won the general election in the 2012 U.S. House of Representatives campaign.

== Defender of human rights and religious freedom ==
Katrina Lantos Swett has made a significant contribution to the field of human rights. She is the President of the Lantos Foundation for Human Rights and Justice, established in 2008 to perpetuate the legacy of her father. She served as Vice-President and President of the United States Commission on International Religious Freedom. Additionally, she is the Co-Chair of the Board of the Committee for Human Rights in North Korea (HRNK).

Since 2021, she has co-chaired the annual International Religious Freedom Summit (IRF) with Sam Brownback, a former Ambassador-at-Large for International Religious Freedom.
