= 2026 New Hampshire Executive Council election =

2026 New Hampshire Executive Council elections
- November 3, 2026

All 5 seats on the Executive Council of New Hampshire
	Majority party	Minority party
Party	Democratic	Republican
Seats before	1	4
Seats after	5	0
Seat change	▲4	▼4
- Results of the elections: Democratic hold Democratic gain

The 2026 New Hampshire Executive Council elections were held on November 3, 2026, to elect all five members of the Executive Council of New Hampshire. The primary elections took place on September 8, 2026. Republicans had held a majority on the executive council since 2021.

Democrats swept all five seats, flipping 4 seats previously occupied by Republicans.

== Generic ballot polling ==
Poll source	Date(s) administered	Sample size (Note: Key: A – all adults RV – registered voters LV – likely voters V – unclear)	Margin of error	Republican	Democratic	Other	Undecided
University of New Hampshire	September 17–21, 2026	1,418 (LV)	± 2.6%	39%	49%	1%	11%

== District 1 ==
The 1st district includes six of New Hampshire's thirteen charter cities: Berlin, Dover, Franklin, Laconia, Rochester, and Somersworth. Towns in the district include Alton, Belmont, Conway, Durham, Farmington, Gilford, Meredith, Wakefield, and Wolfeboro. The incumbent is Republican Joseph Kenney, who was re-elected with 55.2% of the vote in 2024.

=== Republican primary ===
==== Nominee ====
- Joseph Kenney, incumbent executive councilor

==== Results ====
Republican primary results
Party	Candidate	Votes	%
Republican	Joseph Kenney (incumbent)	20,775	99.3
Write-in		158	0.7
Total votes		20,933	100.0

=== Democratic primary ===
==== Nominee ====
- Luz Bay, state representative from Strafford 21st district (2022–present)

==== Endorsements ====
Luz Bay

Organizations

- 314 Action
- Planned Parenthood New Hampshire Action Fund

==== Results ====
Democratic primary results
Party	Candidate	Votes	%
Democratic	Luz Bay	26,664	99.5
Write-in		124	0.5
Total votes		26,788	100.0

=== General election ===
==== Results ====
Executive Council District 1 results
Party	Candidate	Votes	%
Democratic	Luz Bay	64,227	51.4
Republican	Joseph Kenney (incumbent)	60,500	48.5
Write-in		86	0.1
Total votes		124,813	100.0

== District 2 ==
The 2nd district includes four of New Hampshire's thirteen charter cities: Claremont, Concord, Keene, and Lebanon. Towns in the district include Bow, Charlestown, Hanover, Henniker, Hopkinton, Littleton, Newport, Peterborough, and Plymouth. The incumbent is Democrat Karen Liot Hill, who was elected with 56.9% of the vote in 2024.

=== Democratic primary ===
==== Nominee ====
- Karen Liot Hill, incumbent executive councilor

==== Endorsements ====
Karen Liot Hill

Organizations

- Planned Parenthood New Hampshire Action Fund

==== Results ====
Democratic primary results
Party	Candidate	Votes	%
Democratic	Karen Liot Hill (incumbent)	32,639	99.7
Write-in		91	0.3
Total votes		32,730	100.0

=== Republican primary ===
==== Nominee ====
- Tobin Menard, candidate for state representative in 2020 and 2022

==== Eliminated in primary ====
- Kim Strathdee, perennial candidate and nominee for this district in 2024

==== Results ====
Republican primary results
Party	Candidate	Votes	%
Republican	Tobin Menard	7,407	54.1
Republican	Kim Strathdee	6,139	44.9
Write-in		135	1.0
Total votes		13,681	100.0

=== General election ===
==== Results ====
Executive Council District 2 results
Party	Candidate	Votes	%
Democratic	Karen Liot Hill (incumbent)	81,364	64.7
Republican	Tobin Menard	44,197	35.2
Write-in		104	0.1
Total votes		125,665	100.0

== District 3 ==
The 3rd district includes one of New Hampshire's thirteen charter cities, Portsmouth. Towns in the district include Atkinson, Chester, Epping, Exeter, Hampstead, Hampton, Kingston, Newmarket, Pelham, Plaistow, Raymond, Rye, Salem, Sandown, Seabrook, Stratham, and Windham. The incumbent is Republican Janet Stevens, who was re-elected with 55% of the vote in 2024.

=== Republican primary ===
==== Nominee ====
- Janet Stevens, incumbent executive councilor

==== Eliminated in primary ====
- Gregory Whirley

==== Results ====
Republican primary results
Party	Candidate	Votes	%
Republican	Janet Stevens (incumbent)	15,153	66.5
Republican	Gregory Whirley	7,561	33.2
Write-in		73	0.3
Total votes		22,787	100.0

=== Democratic primary ===
==== Nominee ====
- Lisa Kennedy Sheldon, nurse

==== Endorsements ====
Lisa Kennedy Sheldon

Organizations

- 314 Action
- Planned Parenthood New Hampshire Action Fund

==== Results ====
Democratic primary results
Party	Candidate	Votes	%
Democratic	Lisa Kennedy Sheldon	26,836	99.7
Write-in		76	0.3
Total votes		26,912	100.0

=== General election ===
==== Results ====
Executive Council District 3 results
Party	Candidate	Votes	%
Democratic	Lisa Kennedy Sheldon	70,251	52.1
Republican	Janet Stevens (incumbent)	64,617	47.9
Write-in		68	0.0
Total votes		134,936	100.0

== District 4 ==
The 4th district includes one of New Hampshire's thirteen charter cities, Manchester. Towns in the district include Auburn, Barrington, Bedford, Goffstown, Hooksett, Londonderry, Loudon, Nottingham, and Pembroke. The incumbent is Republican John Stephen, who was elected with 53.8% of the vote in 2024.

=== Republican primary ===
==== Nominee ====
- John Stephen, incumbent executive councilor

==== Eliminated in primary ====
- Terese Bastarache, nurse and candidate for this district in 2022 and 2024
- Harriet Cady, former state representative (2002–2010)

==== Endorsements ====
John Stephen

Organizations

- Americans for Prosperity–NH

==== Results ====
Republican primary results
Party	Candidate	Votes	%
Republican	John Stephen (incumbent)	14,261	76.1
Republican	Terese Bastarache	2,543	13.5
Republican	Harriet Cady	1,877	10.0
Write-in		69	0.4
Total votes		18,750	100.0

=== Democratic primary ===
==== Nominee ====
- Jim O'Connell, at-large Manchester school board member and nominee for this district in 2024

==== Endorsements ====
Jim O'Connell

Organizations

- Planned Parenthood New Hampshire Action Fund

==== Results ====
Democratic primary results
Party	Candidate	Votes	%
Democratic	Jim O'Connell	22,817	99.4
Write-in		130	0.6
Total votes		22,947	100.0

=== General election ===
==== Results ====
Executive Council District 4 results
Party	Candidate	Votes	%
Democratic	Jim O'Connell	60,540	53.5
Republican	John Stephen (incumbent)	52,547	46.4
Write-in		64	0.1
Total votes		113,151	100.0

== District 5 ==
The 5th district includes one of New Hampshire's thirteen charter cities, Nashua. Towns in the district include Amherst, Brookline, Hillsborough, Hollis, Hudson, Jaffrey, Litchfield, Merrimack, Milford, New Boston, New Ipswich, Rindge, Swanzey, and Weare. The incumbent is Republican Dave Wheeler, who was re-elected with 53.4% of the vote in 2024.

=== Republican primary ===
==== Nominee ====
- Dave Wheeler, incumbent executive councilor

==== Results ====
Republican primary results
Party	Candidate	Votes	%
Republican	Dave Wheeler (incumbent)	17,495	99.2
Write-in		137	0.8
Total votes		17,632	100.0

=== Democratic primary ===
==== Nominee ====
- Melanie Levesque, former state senator from the 12th district (2018–2020) and nominee for this district in 2024

==== Endorsements ====
Melanie Levesque

Organizations

- Planned Parenthood New Hampshire Action Fund

==== Results ====
Democratic primary results
Party	Candidate	Votes	%
Democratic	Melanie Levesque	22,744	99.8
Write-in		52	0.2
Total votes		22,796	100.0

=== General election ===
==== Results ====
Executive Council District 5 results
Party	Candidate	Votes	%
Democratic	Melanie Levesque	64,712	53.7
Republican	Dave Wheeler (incumbent)	55,615	46.2
Write-in		75	0.1
Total votes		120,402	100.0
