= 2024 New Hampshire Executive Council election =

2024 New Hampshire Executive Council elections
- November 5, 2024

All 5 seats on the Executive Council of New Hampshire
	Majority party	Minority party
Party	Republican	Democratic
Last election	4 seats	1 seats
Seats before	4	1
Seats won	4	1
Seat change	Steady	Steady
Popular vote	405,473	371,739
Percentage	52.17%	47.83%
Swing	▲2.29%	▼2.29%
- Results: Democratic hold Republican hold Vote share: 50–60% 50–60%

The 2024 New Hampshire Executive Council elections took place on November 5, 2024, to elect all five members of the Executive Council of New Hampshire. Party primaries were held on September 10. Republicans have held a majority on the executive council since 2021.

== District 1 ==
After redistricting, the 1st district includes six of New Hampshire's thirteen charter cities: Berlin, Dover, Franklin, Laconia, Rochester, and Somersworth. Towns in the district include Alton, Belmont, Conway, Durham, Farmington, Gilford, Meredith, Wakefield, and Wolfeboro. The incumbent is Republican Joseph Kenney, who was re-elected with 51.7% of the vote in 2022.

=== Republican primary ===
==== Declared ====
- Joseph Kenney, incumbent executive councilor

==== Results ====
Republican primary results
Party	Candidate	Votes	%
Republican	Joseph Kenney (incumbent)	23,807	99.34%
Democratic	Emmett Soldati (write-in)	54	0.23%
Write-in		104	0.43%
Total votes		23,965	100%

=== Democratic primary ===
==== Declared ====
- Emmett Soldati, cafe owner and candidate for the 2nd district in 2020

==== Results ====
Democratic primary results
Party	Candidate	Votes	%
Democratic	Emmett Soldati	21,036	99.47%
Republican	Joseph Kenney (incumbent, write-in)	49	0.23%
Write-in		64	0.30%
Total votes		21,149	100%

=== General election ===
==== Endorsements ====
Emmett Soldati (D)

Organizations

- Planned Parenthood New Hampshire Action Fund

==== Results ====
2024 New Hampshire's 1st Executive Council district election
Party	Candidate	Votes	%
Republican	Joseph Kenney (incumbent)	87,132	55.20%
Democratic	Emmett Soldati	70,647	44.76%
Write-in		71	0.04%
Total votes		157,850	100%

== District 2 ==
After redistricting, the 2nd district includes four of New Hampshire's thirteen charter cities: Claremont, Concord, Keene, and Lebanon. Towns in the district include Bow, Charlestown, Hanover, Henniker, Hopkinton, Littleton, Newport, Peterborough, and Plymouth. The incumbent was Democrat Cinde Warmington, who was re-elected with 60.0% of the vote in 2022. Warmington did not seek re-election, instead choosing to run for governor.

=== Democratic primary ===
==== Nominee ====
- Karen Liot Hill, Grafton County Treasurer

==== Eliminated in primary ====
- Mike Liberty, New Hampshire Democratic Party finance chair

==== Declined ====
- Cinde Warmington, incumbent executive councilor (ran for governor)

==== Results ====
Democratic primary results
Party	Candidate	Votes	%
Democratic	Karen Liot Hill	18,282	55.26%
Democratic	Mike Liberty	14,750	44.59%
Republican	Kim Strathdee (write-in)	3	0.01%
Republican	Mary Rose Deak (write-in)	3	0.01%
Write-in		44	0.13%
Total votes		33,082	100%

=== Republican primary ===
==== Nominee ====
- Kim Strathdee, cook, antiques seller, farmer, carpenter, mechanic, and perennial candidate

==== Eliminated in primary ====
- Mary Rose Deak, laboratory scientist

==== Declined ====
- Harold French, former state senator and nominee for this district in 2022

==== Results ====
Republican primary results
Party	Candidate	Votes	%
Republican	Kim Strathdee	9,279	55.74%
Republican	Mary Rose Deak	7,065	42.44%
Democratic	Mike Liberty (write-in)	57	0.34%
Democratic	Karen Liot Hill (write-in)	41	0.25%
Write-in		206	1.23%
Total votes		16,648	100%

=== General election ===
==== Endorsements ====
Karen Liot Hill (D)

Organizations

- Planned Parenthood New Hampshire Action Fund

==== Results ====
2024 New Hampshire's 2nd Executive Council district election
Party	Candidate	Votes	%
Democratic	Karen Liot Hill	87,633	56.92%
Republican	Kim Strathdee	66,150	42.96%
Write-in		180	0.12%
Total votes		153,963	100%

== District 3 ==
The 3rd district includes one of New Hampshire's thirteen charter cities, Portsmouth. Towns in the district include Atkinson, Chester, Epping, Exeter, Hampstead, Hampton, Kingston, Newmarket, Pelham, Plaistow, Raymond, Rye, Salem, Sandown, Seabrook, Stratham, and Windham. The incumbent was Republican Janet Stevens, who was re-elected with 53.2% of the vote in 2022.

=== Republican primary ===
==== Declared ====
- Janet Stevens, incumbent executive councilor

==== Results ====
Republican primary results
Party	Candidate	Votes	%
Republican	Janet Stevens (incumbent)	25,300	99.01%
Democratic	Jon Morgan (write-in)	23	0.09%
Write-in		229	0.90%
Total votes		25,552	100%

=== Democratic primary ===
==== Declared ====
- Jon Morgan, Brentwood selectman and former state senator

==== Results ====
Democratic primary results
Party	Candidate	Votes	%
Democratic	Jon Morgan	20,313	99.66%
Republican	Janet Stevens (incumbent, write-in)	12	0.06%
Write-in		58	0.28%
Total votes		20,383	100%

=== General election ===
==== Endorsements ====
Jon Morgan (D)

Organizations

- Planned Parenthood New Hampshire Action Fund

==== Results ====
2024 New Hampshire's 3rd Executive Council district election
Party	Candidate	Votes	%
Republican	Janet Stevens (incumbent)	92,634	55.05%
Democratic	Jon Morgan	75,524	44.88%
Write-in		116	0.07%
Total votes		168,274	100%

== District 4 ==
The 4th district includes one of New Hampshire's thirteen charter cities, Manchester. Towns in the district include Auburn, Barrington, Bedford, Goffstown, Hooksett, Londonderry, Loudon, Nottingham, and Pembroke. The incumbent is Republican Ted Gatsas, who was re-elected with 52.3% of the vote in 2022.

=== Republican primary ===
==== Declared ====
- Terese Bastarache, nurse and candidate for this district in 2022
- Robert Burns, former Hillsborough County Treasurer and nominee for New Hampshire's 2nd congressional district in 2022
- John Reagan, former state senator
- John Stephen, former commissioner of the New Hampshire Department of Health & Human Services and nominee for governor in 2010
- Ryan Terrell, former member of the New Hampshire Board of Education
- Ross Terrio, Manchester alder and former state representative

==== Declined ====
- Sharon Carson, majority leader of the New Hampshire Senate
- Ted Gatsas, incumbent executive councilor
- B.J. Perry, former New Hampshire field director for the Republican National Committee

==== Results ====
Republican primary results
Party	Candidate	Votes	%
Republican	John Stephen	9,312	36.85%
Republican	Robert Burns	5,748	22.75%
Republican	Terese Bastarache	4,167	16.49%
Republican	John Reagan	3,758	14.87%
Republican	Ross Terrio	1,295	5.12%
Republican	Ryan Terrell	908	3.59%
Democratic	Jim O'Connell (write-in)	33	0.13%
Write-in		51	0.20%
Total votes		25,272	100%

=== Democratic primary ===
==== Declared ====
- Jim O'Connell, at-large Manchester school board member

==== Withdrawn ====
- Michael Strand, Bedford town councilor (endorsed O'Connell)

==== Results ====
Democratic primary results
Party	Candidate	Votes	%
Democratic	Jim O'Connell	19,431	99.32%
Republican	John Stephen (write-in)	22	0.11%
Republican	Terese Bastarache (write-in)	9	0.05%
Republican	Robert Burns (write-in)	7	0.04%
Republican	John Reagan (write-in)	6	0.03%
Republican	Ryan Terrell (write-in)	4	0.02%
Republican	Ross Terrio (write-in)	1	0.00%
Write-in		84	0.43%
Total votes		19,564	100%

=== General election ===
==== Endorsements ====
Jim O'Connell (D)

Organizations

- Planned Parenthood New Hampshire Action Fund

==== Results ====
2024 New Hampshire's 4th Executive Council district election
Party	Candidate	Votes	%
Republican	John Stephen	77,903	53.78%
Democratic	Jim O'Connell	66,842	46.14%
Write-in		111	0.08%
Total votes		144,856	100%

== District 5 ==
The 5th district includes one of New Hampshire's thirteen charter cities, Nashua. Towns in the district include Amherst, Brookline, Hillsborough, Hollis, Hudson, Jaffrey, Litchfield, Merrimack, Milford, New Boston, New Ipswich, Rindge, Swanzey, and Weare. The incumbent is Republican Dave Wheeler, who was re-elected with 52.3% of the vote in 2022.

=== Republican primary ===
==== Declared ====
- Dave Wheeler, incumbent executive councilor

==== Results ====
Republican primary results
Party	Candidate	Votes	%
Republican	Dave Wheeler (incumbent)	23,068	99.30%
Democratic	Melanie Levesque (write-in)	24	0.10%
Democratic	Shoshanna Kelly (write-in)	16	0.07%
Write-in		123	0.53%
Total votes		23,231	100%

=== Democratic primary ===
==== Nominee ====
- Melanie Levesque, former state senator from the 12th district (2018–2020)

==== Eliminated in primary ====
- Shoshanna Kelly, at-large Nashua alder and nominee for this district in 2022

==== Results ====
Democratic primary results
Party	Candidate	Votes	%
Democratic	Melanie Levesque	12,709	62.30%
Democratic	Shoshanna Kelly	7,641	37.46%
Republican	Dave Wheeler (incumbent, write-in)	21	0.10%
Write-in		29	0.14%
Total votes		20,400	100%

=== General election ===
==== Endorsements ====
Melanie Levesque (D)

Organizations

- Planned Parenthood New Hampshire Action Fund

==== Results ====
2024 New Hampshire's 5th Executive Council district election
Party	Candidate	Votes	%
Republican	Dave Wheeler (incumbent)	81,654	53.44%
Democratic	Melanie Levesque	71,093	46.52%
Write-in		63	0.04%
Total votes		152,810	100%

== See also ==
- 2024 New Hampshire elections
- 2024 New Hampshire gubernatorial election
- 2024 United States House of Representatives elections in New Hampshire
