= 2018 New Hampshire Executive Council election =

2018 New Hampshire Executive Council elections
- November 6, 2018

All 5 seats on the Executive Council of New Hampshire 3 seats were needed for a majority
	Majority party	Minority party
Party	Democratic	Republican
Last election	2 seats	3 seats
Seats won	3	2
Seat change	▲1	▼1
Popular vote	282,602	259,384
Percentage	50.90%	46.72%
- Results of the elections: Democratic hold Democratic gain Republican hold Republican gain
Council control before election
Republican
Council control after election
Democratic

The 2018 New Hampshire Executive Council elections were held on November 6, 2018 to elect all five members of the Executive Council of New Hampshire. The party primaries were held on September 11.

The Democrats gained a majority on the council for the first time since 2014.

== Overview of results ==
Party	Candidates	Votes		Seats		
Party	Candidates	No.	%	No.	+/–	%
Democratic	5	282,602	50.90	3	▲1	60%
Republican	5	259,384	46.72	2	▼1	40%
Libertarian	4	12,996	2.34	0	Steady	0%
Write-ins		215	0.04	0	Steady	0%
Total	14	555,197	100%	5	Steady	100%

Popular vote
Democratic	50.90%
Republican	46.72%

== District 1 ==
District 1 covered all of Coos, Carroll, and Grafton counties, plus the municipalities of Alton, Center Harbor, Gilford, Laconia, Meredith, New Hampton, Sanbornton, Tilton in Belknap County, the towns of Andover, Danbury, Hill, New London, and Wilmot in Merrimack County, the towns of Middleton, Milton, and New Durham in Strafford County, and the municipalities of Claremont, Cornish, Croydon, Grantham, Newport, Plainfield, Springfield, and Sunapee in Sullivan County.

=== General election ===
Incumbent Republican councillor Joseph Kenney was defeated by Democratic challenger Michael Cyrans, a former banker and high school teacher.

Executive Council District 1 general election
Party	Candidate	Votes	%	±%
Democratic	Michael Cryans	58,066	50.66%	
Republican	Joseph Kenney (incumbent)	53,956	47.07%	
Libertarian	Tobin Menard	2,571	2.24%	
n/a	Write-ins	25	0.02%	
Total votes		114,618	100%	N/A
Democratic gain from Republican				

== District 2 ==
District 2 covered the towns of Barnstead, Belmont, and Gilmanton in Belknap County, the municipalities of Alstead, Chesterfield, Dublin, Gilsum, Harrisville, Hinsdale, Keene, Marlborough, Marlow, Nelson, Roxbury, Stoddard, Sullivan, Surry, Walpole, Westmoreland, and Winchester in Cheshire County, the town of Hancock in Hillsborough County, the municipalities of Boscawen, Bradford, Canterbury, Concord, Franklin, Henniker, Hopkinton, Newbury, Northfield, Salisbury, Sutton, Warner, and Webster in Merrimack County, the municipalities of Dover, Durham, Farmington, Madbury, Rochester, Rollinsford, Somersworth, and Strafford in Strafford County, and the towns of Acworth, Charlestown, Goshen, Langdon, Lempster, Unity, and Washington in Sullivan County.

=== General election ===
Incumbent Democratic councillor Andru Volinsky won re-election over Republican challenger James Beard.

Executive Council District 2 general election
Party	Candidate	Votes	%	±%
Democratic	Andru Volinsky (incumbent)	63,059	57.90%	
Republican	James Beard	45,768	42.03%	
n/a	Write-ins	282	0.07%	
Total votes		108,901	100%	N/A
Democratic hold				

== District 3 ==
District 3 covered the municipalities of Atkinson, Brentwood, Chester, Danville, Derry, East Kingston, Epping, Exeter, Fremont, Greenland, Hampstead, Hampton, Hampton Falls, Kensington, Kingston, New Castle, Newfields, Newington, Newmarket, Newton, North Hampton, Plaistow, Portsmouth, Raymond, Rye, Salem, Sandown, Seabrook, South Hampton, Stratham, and Windham in Rockingham County, and the town of Pelham in Hillsborough County.

=== General election ===
Executive Council District 3 general election
Party	Candidate	Votes	%	±%
Republican	Russell Prescott (incumbent)	57,956	48.95%	
Democratic	Joe Pace	56,902	48.06%	
Libertarian	James Jarvis	3,504	2.96%	
n/a	Write-ins	27	0.02%	
Total votes		118,389	100%	N/A
Republican hold				

== District 4 ==
District 4 covered the municipalities of Bedford, Goffstown, and Manchester Hillsborough County, the towns of Allenstown, Bow, Chichester, Epsom, Hooksett, Loudon, Pembroke, and Pittsfield in Merrimack County, the towns of Auburn, Candia, Deerfield, Londonderry, Northwood, and Nottingham in Rockingham County, and the towns of Barrington and Lee in Strafford County.

=== General election ===
Executive Council District 4 general election
Party	Candidate	Votes	%	±%
Republican	Ted Gatsas	50,692	48.91%	
Democratic	Gray Chynoweth	49,137	47.41%	
Libertarian	Richard Tomasso	3,746	3.61%	
n/a	Write-ins	63	0.06%	
Total votes		103,638	100%	N/A
Republican gain from Democratic				

== District 5 ==
District 5 covered the towns of Fitzwilliam, Jaffrey, Richmond, Rindge, Swanzey, and Troy in Cheshire County, the town of Dunbarton in Merrimack County, and the municipalities of Amherst, Antrim, Bennington, Brookline, Deering, Francestown, Greenfield, Greenville, Hillsborough, Hollis, Hudson, Litchfield, Lyndeborough, Mason, Merrimack, Milford, Mont Vernon, Nashua, New Boston, New Ipswich, Peterborough, Sharon, Temple, Weare, Wilton, and Windsor in Hillsborough County.

=== General election ===
Executive Council District 5 general election
Party	Candidate	Votes	%	±%
Democratic	Debora Pignatelli	55,438	50.56%	
Republican	Dave Wheeler (incumbent)	51,012	46.52%	
Libertarian	Brian Chabot	3,175	2.90%	
n/a	Write-ins	26	0.02%	
Total votes		109,651	100%	N/A
Democratic gain from Republican				
