= 2022 New Hampshire Executive Council election =

2022 New Hampshire Executive Council elections
- November 8, 2022

All 5 seats on the Executive Council of New Hampshire
	Majority party	Minority party
Party	Republican	Democratic
Last election	4 seats	1 seats
Seats before	4	1
Seats won	4	1
Seat change	Steady	Steady
Popular vote	301,723	303,223
Percentage	49.88%	50.12%
Swing	▼2.11%	▲2.11%
- Results of the elections: Democratic hold Republican hold

The 2022 New Hampshire Executive Council elections took place on November 8, 2022, to elect all five members of the Executive Council of New Hampshire. The party primaries were held on September 13. These elections are notable because although Democrats won the majority of the votes in the five concurrent elections, they only won one of the five seats.

== District 1 ==
After redistricting, the 1st district includes six of New Hampshire's thirteen charter cities: Berlin, Dover, Franklin, Laconia, Rochester, and Somersworth. Towns in the district include Alton, Belmont, Conway, Durham, Farmington, Gilford, Meredith, Wakefield, and Wolfeboro. The incumbent was Republican Joseph Kenney. Kenney, first elected in 2014 special election, was running for re-election.

=== Republican nominee ===
- Joseph Kenney, incumbent executive councilor

Republican primary
Party	Candidate	Votes	%
Republican	Joseph Kenney (incumbent)	24,764	99.82%
Democratic	Dana Hilliard (write-in)	44	0.18%
Total votes		24,808	100.0%

=== Democratic nominee ===
- Dana Hilliard, mayor of Somersworth

Democratic primary
Party	Candidate	Votes	%
Democratic	Dana Hilliard	15,971	99.64%
Republican	Joseph Kenney (incumbent, write-in)	57	0.36%
Total votes		16,028	100.0%

=== General election ===
General election
Party	Candidate	Votes	%
Republican	Joseph Kenney (incumbent)	63,230	51.68%
Democratic	Dana Hilliard	59,060	48.27%
Total votes		122,346	100.0%

== District 2 ==
After redistricting, the 2nd district includes four of New Hampshire's thirteen charter cities: Claremont, Concord, Keene, and Lebanon. Towns in the district include Bow, Charlestown, Hanover, Henniker, Hopkinton, Littleton, Newport, Peterborough, and Plymouth. The incumbent was Democrat Cinde Warmington. First elected in 2020, Warmington was running for re-election.

=== Democratic primary ===
==== Candidates ====
- Michael Cryans, former District 1 Executive Councilor
- Bradford Todd
- Cinde Warmington, incumbent executive councilor

==== Results ====
Democratic primary
Party	Candidate	Votes	%
Democratic	Cinde Warmington (incumbent)	21,040	79.35%
Democratic	Michael Cryans	4,244	16.00%
Democratic	Bradford Todd	1,206	4.55%
Republican	Harold French (write-in)	20	0.08%
Republican	Kim Strathdee (write-in)	4	0.02%
Total votes		26,514	100.0%

=== Republican primary ===
==== Candidates ====
- Harold French, state senator
- Kim Strathdee, cook, antiques seller, farmer, carpenter, mechanic, and candidate for Executive Council District 2 in 2018 and 2020

==== Results ====
Republican primary
Party	Candidate	Votes	%
Republican	Harold French	12,184	66.37%
Republican	Kim Strathdee	6,095	33.20%
Democratic	Cinde Warmington (incumbent, write-in)	42	0.23%
Democratic	Michael Cryans (write-in)	36	0.20%
Total votes		18,357	100.0%

=== General election ===
General election
Party	Candidate	Votes	%
Democratic	Cinde Warmington (incumbent)	74,107	59.95%
Republican	Harold French	49,428	40.31%
Total votes		123,612	100.0%

== District 3 ==
After redistricting, the 3rd district includes one of New Hampshire's thirteen charter cities, Portsmouth. Towns in the district include Atkinson, Chester, Epping, Exeter, Hampstead, Hampton, Kingston, Newmarket, Pelham, Plaistow, Raymond, Rye, Salem, Sandown, Seabrook, Stratham, and Windham. The incumbent was Republican Janet Stevens, who was first elected in 2020. Stevens was running for re-election.

=== Republican nominee ===
- Janet Stevens, incumbent executive councilor

Republican primary
Party	Candidate	Votes	%
Republican	Janet Stevens (incumbent)	26,433	99.92%
Democratic	Katherine Harake (write-in)	20	0.08%
Total votes		26,453	100.0%

=== Democratic nominee ===
- Katherine Harake, chair of the Hampton Budget Committee

Democratic primary
Party	Candidate	Votes	%
Democratic	Katherine Harake	16,288	99.87%
Republican	Janet Stevens (incumbent, write-in)	21	0.13%
Total votes		16,309	100.0%

=== General election ===
General election
Party	Candidate	Votes	%
Republican	Janet Stevens (incumbent)	69,898	53.16%
Democratic	Katherine Harake	61,506	46.78%
Total votes		131,487	100.0%

== District 4 ==
After redistricting, the 4th district includes one of New Hampshire's thirteen charter cities, Manchester. Towns in the district include Auburn, Barrington, Bedford, Goffstown, Hooksett, Londonderry, Loudon, Nottingham, and Pembroke. The incumbent was Republican Ted Gatsas, who was first elected in 2018. Gatsas was running for re-election.

=== Republican primary ===
==== Candidates ====
- Ted Gatsas, incumbent executive councilor
- Terese Grinnell, nurse

==== Results ====
Republican primary
Party	Candidate	Votes	%
Republican	Ted Gatsas (incumbent)	18,704	72.40%
Republican	Terese Grinnell	7,116	27.54%
Democratic	Kevin Cavanaugh (write-in)	15	0.06%
Total votes		25,835	100.0%

=== Democratic nominee ===
- Kevin Cavanaugh, state senator

Democratic primary
Party	Candidate	Votes	%
Democratic	Kevin Cavanaugh	13,789	99.67%
Republican	Ted Gatsas (incumbent, write-in)	37	0.27%
Republican	Terese Grinnell (write-in)	9	0.07%
Total votes		13,835	100.0%

=== General election ===
Executive Council District 4 general election
Party	Candidate	Votes	%
Republican	Ted Gatsas (incumbent)	58,123	52.32%
Democratic	Kevin Cavanaugh	52,858	47.58%
Total votes		111,085	100.0%

== District 5 ==
After redistricting, the 5th district includes one of New Hampshire's thirteen charter cities, Nashua. Towns in the district include Amherst, Brookline, Hillsborough, Hollis, Hudson, Jaffrey, Litchfield, Merrimack, Milford, New Boston, New Ipswich, Rindge, Swanzey, and Weare. The incumbent was Republican Dave Wheeler, who was first elected in 2020. Wheeler was running for re-election.

=== Republican primary ===
==== Candidates ====
- Anne Copp, former state representative
- Dave Wheeler, incumbent executive councilor

==== Results ====
Republican primary
Party	Candidate	Votes	%
Republican	Dave Wheeler (incumbent)	18,160	77.45%
Republican	Anne Copp	5,259	22.44%
Democratic	Shoshanna Kelly (write-in)	18	0.08%
Total votes		23,437	100.0%

=== Democratic nominee ===
- Shoshanna Kelly, at-large Nashua alderwoman

Democratic primary
Party	Candidate	Votes	%
Democratic	Shoshanna Kelly	13,504	99.69%
Republican	Dave Wheeler (incumbent, write-in)	33	0.24%
Republican	Anne Copp (write-in)	9	0.07%
Total votes		13,546	100.0%

=== General election ===
Executive Council District 5 general election
Party	Candidate	Votes	%
Republican	Dave Wheeler (incumbent)	61,044	52.28%
Democratic	Shoshanna Kelly	55,692	47.70%
Total votes		116,759	100.0%

== See also ==
- 2022 New Hampshire elections
- 2022 New Hampshire gubernatorial election
- 2022 United States Senate election in New Hampshire
- 2022 United States House of Representatives elections in New Hampshire
