= 2020 New Hampshire Executive Council election =

2020 New Hampshire Executive Council elections
- November 3, 2020

All 5 seats on the Executive Council of New Hampshire
	Majority party	Minority party
Party	Republican	Democratic
Last election	2 seats	3 seats
Seats before	2	3
Seats after	4	1
Seat change	▲2	▼2
Popular vote	398,757	368,190
Percentage	51.99%	48.01%
Swing	▲5.27%	▼2.89%
- Results of the elections: Democratic hold Republican hold Republican gain Result undetermined

The 2020 New Hampshire Executive Council elections took place on Tuesday, November 3, 2020, to elect all five members of the Executive Council of New Hampshire. The party primaries were held on September 8.

== Overview of results ==
Party	Candidates	Votes		Seats		
Party	Candidates	No.	%	No.	∆No.	%
Republican	5	398,757	51.99%	4	▲2	80.0%
Democratic	5	368,190	48.01%	1	▼2	20.0%
Total		766,947	100.0%	5	Steady	100.0%
Source: New Hampshire Elections Results

Popular vote
Republican	51.99%
Democratic	48.01%

Executive Council seats
Republican	80.0%
Democratic	20.0%

== District 1 ==
District 1 covered all of Coos, Carroll, and Grafton counties, plus the municipalities of Alton, Center Harbor, Gilford, Laconia, Meredith, New Hampton, Sanbornton, Tilton in Belknap County, the towns of Andover, Danbury, Hill, New London, and Wilmot in Merrimack County, the towns of Middleton, Milton, and New Durham in Strafford County, and the municipalities of Claremont, Cornish, Croydon, Grantham, Newport, Plainfield, Springfield, and Sunapee in Sullivan County.

=== General election ===
Executive Council District 1 general election
Party	Candidate	Votes	%
Republican	Joseph Kenney	80,073	51.69%
Democratic	Michael Cryans (incumbent)	74,847	48.31%
Total votes		154,920	100.0%
Republican gain from Democratic			

== District 2 ==
District 2 covered the towns of Barnstead, Belmont, and Gilmanton in Belknap County, the municipalities of Alstead, Chesterfield, Dublin, Gilsum, Harrisville, Hinsdale, Keene, Marlborough, Marlow, Nelson, Roxbury, Stoddard, Sullivan, Surry, Walpole, Westmoreland, and Winchester in Cheshire County, the town of Hancock in Hillsborough County, the municipalities of Boscawen, Bradford, Canterbury, Concord, Franklin, Henniker, Hopkinton, Newbury, Northfield, Salisbury, Sutton, Warner, and Webster in Merrimack County, the municipalities of Dover, Durham, Farmington, Madbury, Rochester, Rollinsford, Somersworth, and Strafford in Strafford County, and the towns of Acworth, Charlestown, Goshen, Langdon, Lempster, Unity, and Washington in Sullivan County.

=== General election ===
Executive Council District 2 general election
Party	Candidate	Votes	%
Democratic	Cinde Warmington	79,266	54.44%
Republican	Jim Beard	66,325	45.56%
Total votes		145,591	100.0%
Democratic hold			

== District 3 ==
District 3 covered the municipalities of Atkinson, Brentwood, Chester, Danville, Derry, East Kingston, Epping, Exeter, Fremont, Greenland, Hampstead, Hampton, Hampton Falls, Kensington, Kingston, New Castle, Newfields, Newington, Newmarket, Newton, North Hampton, Plaistow, Portsmouth, Raymond, Rye, Salem, Sandown, Seabrook, South Hampton, Stratham, and Windham in Rockingham County, and the town of Pelham in Hillsborough County.

=== General election ===
Executive Council District 3 general election
Party	Candidate	Votes	%
Republican	Janet Stevens	85,821	52.4%
Democratic	Mindi Messmer	77,971	47.6%
Total votes		163,792	100.0%
Republican hold			

== District 4 ==
District 4 covered the municipalities of Bedford, Goffstown, and Manchester Hillsborough County, the towns of Allenstown, Bow, Chichester, Epsom, Hooksett, Loudon, Pembroke, and Pittsfield in Merrimack County, the towns of Auburn, Candia, Deerfield, Londonderry, Northwood, and Nottingham in Rockingham County, and the towns of Barrington and Lee in Strafford County.

=== General election ===
Executive Council District 4 general election
Party	Candidate	Votes	%
Republican	Ted Gatsas (incumbent)	78,975	55.64%
Democratic	Mark MacKenzie	62,971	44.36%
Total votes		141,946	100.0%
Republican hold			

== District 5 ==
District 5 covered the towns of Fitzwilliam, Jaffrey, Richmond, Rindge, Swanzey, and Troy in Cheshire County, the town of Dunbarton in Merrimack County, and the municipalities of Amherst, Antrim, Bennington, Brookline, Deering, Francestown, Greenfield, Greenville, Hillsborough, Hollis, Hudson, Litchfield, Lyndeborough, Mason, Merrimack, Milford, Mont Vernon, Nashua, New Boston, New Ipswich, Peterborough, Sharon, Temple, Weare, Wilton, and Windsor in Hillsborough County.

=== General election ===
Executive Council District 5 general election
Party	Candidate	Votes	%
Republican	Dave Wheeler	74,622	50.5%
Democratic	Debora Pignatelli (incumbent)	73,135	49.5%
Total votes		147,757	100.0%
Republican gain from Democratic			

== See also ==
- 2020 New Hampshire elections
- 2020 United States presidential election in New Hampshire
- 2020 New Hampshire gubernatorial election
- 2020 United States Senate election in New Hampshire
- 2020 United States House of Representatives elections in New Hampshire
