= Lisa Sheldon =

American politician

Lisa Kennedy Sheldon

Member-elect of the New Hampshire Executive Council from the 3rd district
- Assuming office January 2027
- Succeeding: Janet Stevens

Personal details
- Party: Democratic

Lisa Kennedy Sheldon is a New Hampshire politician who is the member-elect of the New Hampshire Executive Council from the 3rd district. She ran for the position in 2026 defeating incumbent Republican councilor Janet Stevens. Professionally, Kennedy Sheldon is a nurse practitioner.
