= Timothy Robertson (politician) =

American politician (1932–2025)

Member of the New Hampshire House of Representatives from the Cheshire 18th district
- In office December 1992 – December 2000
- Preceded by: district created
- Succeeded by: Chandler Fairbanks

Member of the New Hampshire House of Representatives from the Cheshire 25th district
- In office December 2002 – December 2004 Serving with J. Timothy Dunn, Peter S. Espiefs, Douglas K. Fish, David Meader, Pamela Russell Slack, Chuck Weed
- Preceded by: district created
- Succeeded by: district abolished

Member of the New Hampshire House of Representatives from the Cheshire 3rd district
- In office December 2004 – December 2010 Serving with Suzanne Butcher (2004–2010), J. Timothy Dunn (2004–2008), Peter S. Espiefs (2004–2008), Kris Roberts (2004–2010), Stephanie Sinclair (2004–2006), Chuck Weed (2004–2010), Delmar D. Burridge (2006–2010), Steven W. Lindsey (2008–2010), David Meader (2008–2010)

Member of the New Hampshire House of Representatives from the Cheshire 6th district
- In office December 2012 – December 2016
- Preceded by: redistricted
- Succeeded by: David Meader

Personal details
- Born: June 6, 1932 Brattleboro, Vermont, U.S.
- Died: January 29, 2025 (aged 92) Keene, New Hampshire, U.S.
- Party: Republican (to c. 1990); Democratic (from c. 1992)
- Spouse: Elsie "Talu" Hartlieb (m. 1958; died 2019)
- Children: 3
- Parents: Ellis Robertson (father); Dorothy Dryann (mother)

Timothy Norris Robertson (June 6, 1932 – January 29, 2025) was an American politician from the state of New Hampshire. He served as a Democratic member of the New Hampshire House of Representatives and sought the gubernatorial nomination in 2010.

== Life and career ==
Robertson was born in Brattleboro, Vermont, on June 6, 1932, the son of Ellis and Dorothy (née Drynan) Robertson. He moved with his family to Keene, New Hampshire, in 1936, and graduated from Keene High School. He attended Harvard College for one semester, then earned a bachelor's degree in economics from Hobart and William Smith Colleges after serving in the U.S. Army. He married Elsie "Talu" Hartlieb in 1958, and they had three children. He joined his father in running Robertson Motor Co., a business founded by his grandfather.

He ran for the New Hampshire House of Representatives as a Republican in 1976 and 1990, losing both campaigns. For 20 of the 24 years from 1992 to 2016, he represented Keene in the state house as a Democrat. Elected in 1992 and re-elected three times, he lost re-election to Republican Chandler Fairbanks in 2000. In 1996, he introduced a constitutional amendment that would have allowed counties to impose an income tax in order to provide property tax relief, altering the state's status as one of the few without a state income tax. In 1997, he became the first New Hampshire legislator to propose allowing the farming of hemp and the medical use of marijuana. He won a seat again in 2002 and was re-elected three times before seeking the gubernatorial nomination in 2010. He characterized his gubernatorial campaign as raising issues surrounding "a tax system heavily aimed at those least able to afford it." After taking just 6.6% against incumbent governor John Lynch, he won a seat again in 2012, was re-elected in 2014, and retired in 2016. In 2015, he introduced a bill that would have allowed municipalities to set their own minimum wages and another that would have set the state's minimum wage at $16. He also served on the Keene city council and Keene school board.

Robertson died at the age of 92 at a retirement home in Keene on January 29, 2025.

== Electoral history ==
Elections in which Robertson achieved at leave 1% of the vote:

=== 1976 ===
==== General election ====
New Hampshire House of Representatives, Cheshire 16th District, 1976 general election * denotes incumbent Source:
Party	Candidate	Votes	%
Democratic	Joan E. Terry	1,039	32.2
Republican	Andrea A. Scranton *	794	24.6
Republican	Timothy Robertson	760	23.5
Democratic	Terry M. Clark	637	19.7
Total votes		3,230	100

=== 1990 ===
==== Primary election ====
New Hampshire House of Representatives, Cheshire 17th District, 1990 primary election * denotes incumbent Source:
Party	Candidate	Votes	%
Republican	Timothy Robertson	956	27.4
Republican	Patricia T. O'Brien	890	25.5
Republican	Wayne L. Spear	834	23.9
Republican	Arlayne E. Pierce	716	20.5
Republican	Katherine D. Foster *	48	1.4
Republican	Richard L. Champagne	37	1.1
Republican	Richard F. Doucette *	11	0.3
Total votes		3,492	100

==== General election ====
New Hampshire House of Representatives, Cheshire 17th District, 1990 general election * denotes incumbent Source:
Party	Candidate	Votes	%
Democratic	Richard L. Champagne	3,455	16.7
Democratic	Katherine D. Foster *	3,301	16.0
Democratic	Margaret A. Lynch	3,017	14.6
Democratic	Richard F. Doucette *	2,985	14.5
Republican	Timothy Robertson	2,344	11.4
Republican	Patricia T. O'Brien	1,958	9.5
Republican	Wayne L. Spear	1,933	9.4
Republican	Arlayne E. Pierce	1,637	7.9
Total votes		20,630	100

=== 1992 ===
==== Primary election ====
New Hampshire House of Representatives, Cheshire 18th District, 1992 primary election * denotes incumbent Source:
Party	Candidate	Votes	%
Democratic	Timothy Robertson	315	98.1
Democratic	Emily B. Evans	6	1.9
Total votes		321	100

==== General election ====
New Hampshire House of Representatives, Cheshire 18th District, 1992 general election * denotes incumbent Source:
Party	Candidate	Votes	%
Democratic	Timothy Robertson	1,135	55.2
Republican	Emily B. Evans	920	44.8
Total votes		2,055	100

=== 1994 ===
==== Primary elections ====
New Hampshire House of Representatives, Cheshire 18th District, 1994 primary elections * denotes incumbent Source:
Party	Candidate	Votes	%
Democratic primary
Democratic	Timothy Robertson *	143	98.6
Democratic	John M. Blackadar	2	1.4
Total votes		145	100
Republican primary
Republican	Timothy Robertson *	22	88.0
Republican	John M. Blackadar	3	2.0
Total votes		25	100

==== General election ====
New Hampshire House of Representatives, Cheshire 18th District, 1994 general election * denotes incumbent Source:
Party	Candidate	Votes	%
Democratic/Republican	Timothy Robertson *	1,162	87.8
Libertarian	John M. Blackadar	161	12.2
Total votes		1,323	100

=== 1996 ===
==== Primary election ====
New Hampshire House of Representatives, Cheshire 18th District, 1996 primary election * denotes incumbent Source:
Party	Candidate	Votes	%
Democratic	Timothy Robertson *	235	100
Total votes		235	100

==== General election ====
New Hampshire House of Representatives, Cheshire 18th District, 1992 general election * denotes incumbent Source:
Party	Candidate	Votes	%
Democratic	Timothy Robertson *	1,099	56.1
Republican	Roger U. Day	860	43.9
Total votes		1,959	100

=== 1998 ===
==== Primary elections ====
New Hampshire House of Representatives, Cheshire 18th District, 1998 primary elections * denotes incumbent Source:
Party	Candidate	Votes	%
Democratic primary
Democratic	Timothy Robertson *	150	100
Total votes		150	100
Republican primary
Republican	Roger U. Day	275	98.6
Republican	Timothy Robertson *	4	1.4
Total votes		279	100

==== General election ====
New Hampshire House of Representatives, Cheshire 18th District, 1992 general election * denotes incumbent Source:
Party	Candidate	Votes	%
Democratic	Timothy Robertson *	849	59.2
Republican	Roger U. Day	585	40.8
Total votes		1,434	100

=== 2000 ===
==== Primary election ====
New Hampshire House of Representatives, Cheshire 18th District, 2000 primary election * denotes incumbent Source:
Party	Candidate	Votes	%
Democratic	Timothy Robertson *	340	98.8
Democratic	Chandler Fairbanks	340	0.9
Write-in		1	0.3
Total votes		344	100

==== General election ====
New Hampshire House of Representatives, Cheshire 18th District, 2000 general election * denotes incumbent Source:
Party	Candidate	Votes	%
Republican	Chandler Fairbanks	1,131	51.2
Democratic	Timothy Robertson *	1,077	48.7
Write-in		3	0.1
Total votes		2,211	100

=== 2002 ===
==== Primary election ====
New Hampshire House of Representatives, Cheshire 25th District, 2002 primary election * denotes incumbent Source:
Party	Candidate	Votes	%
Democratic	Timothy Robertson	1,017	15.4
Democratic	Peter S. Espiefs *	1,009	15.3
Democratic	Pamela Russell Slack	990	15.0
Democratic	Chuck Weed *	977	14.8
Democratic	J. Timothy Dunn	924	14.0
Democratic	David Meader *	895	13.6
Democratic	James T. Brisson	785	11.9
Democratic	Gertrude Pearson	2	0.0
Democratic	Marilyn L. Huston	1	0.0
Total votes		6,600	100

==== General election ====
New Hampshire House of Representatives, Cheshire 25th District, 2002 general election * denotes incumbent Source:
Party	Candidate	Votes	%
Democratic	Peter S. Espiefs *	4,084	9.1
Democratic	Timothy Robertson	4,052	9.0
Democratic	Chuck Weed *	3,988	8.9
Democratic	J. Timothy Dunn	3,871	8.6
Democratic	Pamela Russell Slack	3,862	8.6
Democratic	David Meader *	3,740	8.3
Republican	Douglas K. Fish	3,175	7.1
Democratic	James T. Brisson	3,166	7.1
Republican	Deb Hamel-Kearney	3,131	7.0
Republican	Marilyn L. Huston	2,605	5.8
Republican	Joseph Bendzinski	2,504	5.6
Republican	Gertrude Pearson	2,403	5.4
Republican	Robert F. Williams	2,335	5.2
Republican	Chester Lapointe	1,928	4.3
Write-in		37	0.1
Total votes		44,891	100

=== 2004 ===
==== Primary election ====
New Hampshire House of Representatives, Cheshire 3rd District, 2004 primary election * denotes incumbent Source:
Party	Candidate	Votes	%
Democratic	Timothy Robertson *	1,067	15.4
Democratic	Chuck Weed *	1,064	15.4
Democratic	Peter S. Espiefs *	1,061	15.3
Democratic	J. Timothy Dunn *	1,037	15.0
Democratic	Suzanne Butcher	932	13.4
Democratic	Kris Roberts	858	12.4
Democratic	Stephanie Sinclair	854	12.3
Democratic	Dean J. Eaton	17	0.2
Democratic	George M. Gline	15	0.2
Democratic	Douglas K. Fish *	10	0.1
Write-in		16	0.2
Total votes		6,931	100

==== General election ====
New Hampshire House of Representatives, Cheshire 3rd District, 2004 general election * denotes incumbent Source:
Party	Candidate	Votes	%
Democratic	Chuck Weed *	7,065	10.4
Democratic	J. Timothy Dunn *	6,949	10.2
Democratic	Timothy Robertson *	6,544	9.6
Democratic	Peter S. Espiefs *	6,541	9.6
Democratic	Suzanne Butcher	6,354	9.4
Democratic	Stephanie Sinclair	5,999	8.8
Democratic	Kris Roberts	5,890	8.7
Republican	Dean J. Eaton	4,922	7.2
Republican	Douglas K. Fish *	4,397	6.5
Republican	Roger U. Day	3,477	5.1
Republican	George M. Gline	3,450	5.1
Republican	Robert C. Adam	3,372	5.0
Republican	Michael A. Jacques	2,925	4.3
Write-in		50	0.1
Total votes		67,935	100

=== 2006 ===
==== Primary election ====
New Hampshire House of Representatives, Cheshire 3rd District, 2006 primary election * denotes incumbent Source:
Party	Candidate	Votes	%
Democratic	Chuck Weed *	769	15.5
Democratic	Peter S. Espiefs *	756	15.3
Democratic	J. Timothy Dunn *	739	14.9
Democratic	Timothy Robertson *	720	14.5
Democratic	Suzanne Butcher *	701	14.2
Democratic	Kris Roberts *	657	13.3
Democratic	Delmar D. Burridge	594	12.0
Democratic	David E. Harvey	2	0.0
Democratic	Arto A. Leino	1	0.0
Write-in		10	0.2
Total votes		4,949	100

==== General election ====
New Hampshire House of Representatives, Cheshire 3rd District, 2006 general election * denotes incumbent Source:
Party	Candidate	Votes	%
Democratic	J. Timothy Dunn *	4,808	12.2
Democratic	Peter S. Espiefs *	4,791	12.1
Democratic	Chuck Weed *	4,704	11.9
Democratic	Suzanne Butcher *	4,613	11.7
Democratic	Kris Roberts *	4,571	11.6
Democratic	Timothy Robertson *	4,540	11.5
Democratic	Delmar D. Burridge	4,051	10.3
Republican	Marilyn L. Huston	2,619	6.6
Republican	David E. Harvey	2,395	6.1
Republican	Arto A. Leino	2,346	5.9
Write-in		40	0.1
Total votes		39,478	100

=== 2008 ===
==== Primary election ====
New Hampshire House of Representatives, Cheshire 3rd District, 2008 primary election * denotes incumbent Source:
Party	Candidate	Votes	%
Democratic	Chuck Weed *	683	16.1
Democratic	Timothy Robertson *	647	15.3
Democratic	Kris Roberts *	644	15.2
Democratic	Suzanne Butcher *	629	14.9
Democratic	David Meader	566	13.4
Democratic	Steven W. Lindsey	547	12.9
Democratic	Delmar D. Burridge *	505	11.9
Democratic	William K. Chaffee Jr.	1	0.0
Write-in		12	0.3
Total votes		4,234	100

==== General election ====
New Hampshire House of Representatives, Cheshire 3rd District, 2008 general election * denotes incumbent Source:
Party	Candidate	Votes	%
Democratic	Chuck Weed *	7,573	11.4
Democratic	Kris Roberts *	6,851	10.3
Democratic	Suzanne Butcher *	6,468	9.7
Democratic	Timothy Robertson *	6,366	9.6
Democratic	David Meader	6,313	9.5
Democratic	Steven W. Lindsey	6,309	9.5
Democratic	Delmar D. Burridge *	5,547	8.3
Republican	Maureen Benik Metivier	3,614	5.4
Republican	Peter Benik	3,461	5.2
Republican	David E. Harvey	3,019	4.5
Republican	Arto A. Leino	2,980	4.5
Republican	William K. Chaffee Jr.	2,949	4.4
Republican	Dillon A. Benik	2,839	4.3
Republican	Varrin Swearingen	2,291	3.4
Write-in		65	0.1
Total votes		66,645	100

=== 2010 ===
==== Primary election ====
New Hampshire Governor, 2010 primary election * denotes incumbent Source:
Party	Candidate	Votes	%
Democratic	John Lynch *	50,348	87.5
Democratic	Timothy Robertson	3,792	6.6
Democratic	Frank P. Sullivan	3,418	5.9
Total votes		57,558	100

=== 2012 ===
==== Primary election ====
New Hampshire House of Representatives, Cheshire 6th District, 2012 primary election * denotes incumbent Source:
Party	Candidate	Votes	%
Democratic	Timothy Robertson	319	99.7
Write-in		1	0.3
Total votes		320	100

==== General election ====
New Hampshire House of Representatives, Cheshire 6th District, 2012 general election * denotes incumbent Source:
Party	Candidate	Votes	%
Democratic	Timothy Robertson	1,520	68.8
Republican	Keith Carlsen	684	31.0
Write-in		5	0.2
Total votes		2,209	100

=== 2014 ===
==== Primary election ====
New Hampshire House of Representatives, Cheshire 6th District, 2014 primary election * denotes incumbent Source:
Party	Candidate	Votes	%
Democratic	Timothy Robertson *	181	100
Total votes		181	100

==== General election ====
New Hampshire House of Representatives, Cheshire 6th District, 2014 general election * denotes incumbent Source:
Party	Candidate	Votes	%
Democratic	Timothy Robertson *	1,169	100
Total votes		1,169	100
