= Luz Bay =

American politician

Member-elect of the New Hampshire Executive Council from the 1st district
- Assuming office January 2027
- Succeeding: Joseph Kenney

Member of the New Hampshire House of Representatives from Strafford's 21st district
- Incumbent
- Assumed office December 7, 2022
- Preceded by: Catt Sandler

Personal details
- Born: Philippines
- Party: Democratic
- Education: University of the Philippines, Diliman (BS); Southern Illinois University, Carbondale (MS, PhD)

Luz Bay is a Filipino American politician who is the member-elect of the New Hampshire Executive Council from the 1st district. She is currently serving in the New Hampshire House of Representatives.

== Career ==
Bay has previously served as a delegate to both the 2020 Democratic National Convention and the 2024 Democratic National Convention. Additionally, she currently serves as the treasurer of the New Hampshire Democratic Party AAPI caucus.

== Education ==
Bay has a B.S. in mathematics from the University of the Philippines, an M.S. in mathematics, and a Ph.D in educational measurement and statistics from Southern Illinois University Carbondale.
