= Littleton High School (New Hampshire) =

Location
- 159 Oak Hill Ave; Littleton, New Hampshire 03561; United States; 44°18′36″N 71°46′23″W

Information
- Type: Public high school
- CEEB code: 300340
- Principal: Alan D. Smith
- Assistant Principal: Melissa C. Jones
- Enrollment: 172 (2024-2025)
- Student to teacher ratio: 7.85
- Colors: Maroon and white
- Mascot: Crusader
- Accreditation: NEASC
- Website: Littleton High School official website

Littleton High School is a high school located in the town of Littleton, New Hampshire, Grafton County, New Hampshire, United States. During the 2024–2025 year, the school had 171 students enrolled.

== Notable alumni ==
- Michael Cryans, member of the Executive Council of New Hampshire
- Rich Gale, an American former starting pitcher in Major League Baseball (MLB)
