= Anne Copp =

American politician

Member of the New Hampshire House of Representatives from the Rockingham 6th district
- In office December 2, 2020 – August 5, 2021
- Succeeded by: Jodi Nelson

Member of the New Hampshire House of Representatives from the Merrimack 1st district
- In office December 7, 2016 – December 5, 2018
- Preceded by: Mario Ratzki
- Succeeded by: Ken Wells

Personal details
- Party: Republican

Anne Copp is an American politician from the state of New Hampshire. A member of the Republican Party, she served in the New Hampshire House of Representatives from 2016 to 2018 and from 2020 to 2021.

== Political career ==
Starting in 2006, Copp ran for the New Hampshire House's 1st Merrimack district in every election cycle. In 2016, she was finally elected after a decade of trying. Rather than seeking re-election in that district, she instead ran in the 6th Rockingham district as the Libertarian nominee in 2018, finishing last in a field of 18 candidates. Copp ran for the same district as a Republican in 2020 and won.

On July 1, 2021, Copp moved away from her home in Derry. NH Journal wrote that as of July 27, the "notoriously difficult-to-pin-down" Copp had yet to resign or clarify her new address. Copp eventually acknowledged that she had moved out of her district and resigned on August 5.

In 2022, Copp ran for the 5th district of the New Hampshire Executive Council, challenging incumbent Dave Wheeler in the Republican primary. She took 22.4% of the vote in the Republican primary.

== Political positions ==
Copp is a supporter of Donald Trump. She criticized Mitt Romney for his "grandstanding" vote for Trump's first impeachment and remarked that Romney's "political career and aspirations are over."

Copp opposes abortion "as early as the first trimester."
