= Ken Wells =

American politician

Member of the New Hampshire House of Representatives from the Merrimack 1st district
- In office December 5, 2018 – December 2, 2020
- Preceded by: Anne Copp
- Succeeded by: Louise Andrus

Personal details
- Party: Democratic
- Website: Elect Ken Wells

Kenneth Wells is a New Hampshire politician.

== Career ==
On November 6, 2018, Wells was elected to the New Hampshire House of Representatives where he represented the Merrimack 1 district. Wells assumed office on December 5, 2018. Wells is a Democrat.

== Personal life ==
Wells resides in Andover, New Hampshire. Wells is married and has two children.
