= Timothy Robertson =

Timothy Robertson may refer to:

- Tim Robertson (1944–2026), Australian actor and writer
- Tim Robertson (orienteer) (born 1995), New Zealand orienteering competitor
- Timothy Robertson (politician) (1932–2025), American politician from New Hampshire
