= Raymond Burton =

Raymond or Ray Burton may refer to:

- Ray Burton (musician) (born 1945), Australian musician
- Raymond S. Burton (1939–2013), American politician, known as Ray
