= Jim O'Connell (politician) =

American politician

Member-elect of the New Hampshire Executive Council from the 4th district
- Assuming office January 2027
- Succeeding: John Stephen

Personal details
- Party: Democratic

Jim O'Connell is a New Hampshire politician who is the member-elect of the New Hampshire Executive Council from the 4th district. He ran for the position in 2026 defeating incumbent Republican councilor John Stephen.
