= Mario Ratzki =

American politician

Member of New Hampshire House of Representatives for Merrimack 1
- In office 2012–2016
- Succeeded by: Anne Copp

Personal details
- Party: Democratic
- Education: Lycée Henri-Poincaré; University of California, Berkeley

Mario F. Ratzki is an American politician. He represented Merrimack County on New Hampshire House of Representatives from 2012 to 2016. Outside of politics, he is an antiques dealer. In the legislature, he worked on successfully receiving restitution from the state of Massachusetts to several New Hampshire cities for properties taken in 1957 for flood control. He also formed a bipartisan coalition of legislators called CLAD that opposed the downshifting of State expenses to local governments. He ran for Merrimack County district 2 commissioner in 2020, but lost to Republican Stuart D. Trachy.
