= 2010 New Hampshire gubernatorial election =

- November 2, 2010
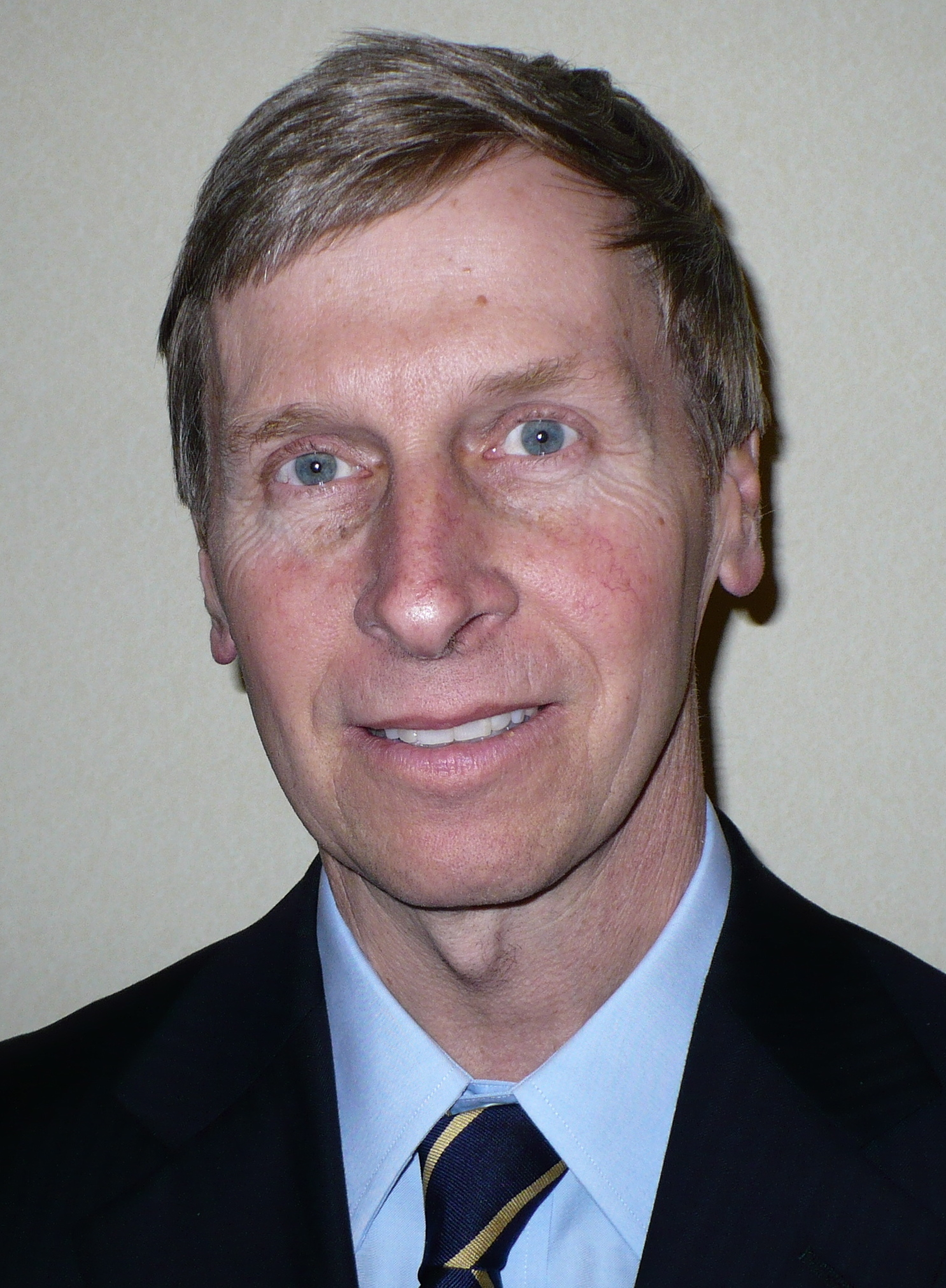

Nominee	John Lynch	John Stephen
Party	Democratic	Republican
Popular vote	239,390	205,433
Percentage	52.63%	45.03%
- Lynch: 40–50% 50–60% 60–70% 70–80% 80–90% >90% Stephen: 40–50% 50–60% 60–70% 70–80% Tie: 40–50%
Governor before election
John Lynch
Democratic
Elected Governor
John Lynch
Democratic

The 2010 New Hampshire gubernatorial election was held on November 2, 2010. Incumbent Democratic Governor John Lynch was re-elected to his fourth and final term.

New Hampshire is one of only two states where the Governor serves for a two-year term, the other being neighboring Vermont. Lynch was re-elected by landslide margins in 2006 and 2008, and enjoyed historically high approval ratings. In early 2010, his approval rating showed a downward trend, with an April poll indicating that his approval had fallen below 50% (44% approve, 42% disapprove). After the primary elections in mid-September, Lynch's approval rating rebounded (51% approve, 38% disapprove).

== Democratic primary ==
=== Candidates ===
==== Declared ====
- John Lynch, incumbent Governor
- Timothy Robertson, state representative
- Frank Sullivan

=== Results ===
Democratic primary results
Party	Candidate	Votes	%
Democratic	John Lynch (incumbent)	49,832	87.5
Democratic	Timothy Robertson	3,771	6.6
Democratic	Frank Sullivan	3,377	5.9
Total votes		56,980	97.3

== Republican primary ==
=== Candidates ===
==== Declared ====
- Frank Robert Emiro Sr., state representative
- Jack Kimball, businessman
- John Stephen, former Health and Human Services Commissioner
- Karen Testerman, conservative activist

==== Declined ====
- Kelly Ayotte, New Hampshire Attorney General
- Frank Guinta, Mayor of Manchester
- Chuck Morse, former State Senator
- John E. Sununu, former U.S. Senator

=== Polling ===
Poll source	Dates administered	Jack Kimball	John Stephen	Karen Testerman
Public Policy Polling	September 11–12, 2010	24%	45%	8%
Public Policy Polling	July 23–25, 2010	15%	26%	5%
Public Policy Polling	April 17–18, 2010	10%	29%	15%

=== Results ===
Results by county: Stephen–60–70% Stephen–50–60% Stephen–40–50%

Republican primary results
Party	Candidate	Votes	%
Republican	John Stephen	77,962	61.6
Republican	Jack Kimball	31,581	24.9
Republican	Karen Testerman	12,708	10.0
Republican	Frank Emiro	4,394	3.5
Total votes		126,645	96.7

== General election ==
=== Candidates ===
- John Babiarz, Libertarian
- John Lynch, Democratic
- John Stephen, Republican

=== Predictions ===
Source	Ranking	As of
Cook Political Report	Tossup	October 14, 2010
Rothenberg	Lean D	October 28, 2010
RealClearPolitics	Lean D	November 1, 2010
Sabato's Crystal Ball	Lean D	October 28, 2010
CQ Politics	Likely D	October 28, 2010

=== Polling ===
Poll source	Date(s) administered	John Lynch (D)	John Stephen (R)
Rasmussen Reports	October 27, 2010	51%	45%
WMUR/UNH	October 7–12, 2010	51%	38%
American Research Group	October 3–5, 2010	51%	41%
Granite State Poll	October 1, 2010	51%	34%
American Research Group	September 22–26, 2010	42%	40%
Rasmussen Reports	September 15, 2010	48%	46%
Public Policy Polling	September 11–12, 2010	51%	39%
Rasmussen Reports	August 5, 2010	50%	39%
Public Policy Polling	July 23–25, 2010	51%	34%
Rasmussen Reports	May 26, 2010	47%	35%
Public Policy Polling	April 17–18, 2010	47%	36%
Rasmussen Reports	April 7, 2010	47%	37%
Rasmussen Reports	March 8, 2010	50%	35%
Granite State Poll	January 27-February 3, 2010	50%	30%

Hypothetical polling

With Kimball

Poll Source	Dates Administered	John Lynch (D)	Jack Kimball (R)
Public Policy Polling	July 23–25, 2010	52%	29%
Rasmussen Reports	May 26, 2010	50%	31%
Public Policy Polling	April 17–18, 2010	47%	35%
Rasmussen Reports	April 7, 2010	50%	34%
Rasmussen Reports	March 8, 2010	51%	32%
Research 2000	February 1–3, 2010	59%	13%
Rasmussen Reports	January 12, 2010	51%	32%
Rasmussen Reports	September 14, 2009	52%	31%

With Morse

Poll Source	Dates Administered	John Lynch (D)	Chuck Morse (R)
Rasmussen Reports	September 14, 2009	51%	29%

With Sununu

Poll Source	Dates Administered	John Lynch (D)	John Sununu (R)
Granite State Poll	September 25-October 2, 2009	50%	37%
Rasmussen Reports	September 14, 2009	48%	43%

With Testerman

Poll Source	Dates Administered	John Lynch (D)	Karen Testerman (R)
Public Policy Polling	July 23–25, 2010	52%	28%
Rasmussen Reports	May 26, 2010	51%	32%
Public Policy Polling	April 17–18, 2010	47%	29%
Rasmussen Reports	April 7, 2010	50%	33%
Rasmussen Reports	March 8, 2010	54%	28%
Rasmussen Reports	January 12, 2010	53%	30%

=== Results ===

2010 New Hampshire gubernatorial election
Party	Candidate	Votes	%	±%
Democratic	John Lynch (incumbent)	240,346	52.63%	−17.57%
Republican	John Stephen	205,616	45.03%	+17.43%
Libertarian	John Babiarz	10,089	2.21%	+0.02%
Write-in		537	<0.01%	N/A
Total votes		456,588	100.00%	N/A
Democratic hold				

==== By county ====
2014 Senate election results in New Hampshire (by county)
County	John Lynch Democratic		John Stephen Republican		Other votes	
	#	%	#	%	#	%
Belknap	11,021	48.7%	11,008	48.7%	580	2.6%
Carroll	10,003	49.2%	9,895	48.7%	413	2.1%
Cheshire	15,429	59.0%	10,082	38.6%	624	2.4%
Coös	5,699	53.8%	4,590	43.3%	306	2.9%
Grafton	18,618	59.3%	11,898	37.9%	894	2.8%
Hillsborough	65,183	49.9%	62,704	48.0%	2,704	2.1%
Merrimack	31,929	58.0%	21,548	39.2%	1,550	2.8%
Rockingham	51,714	48.4%	53,049	49.6%	2,193	2.0%
Strafford	22,807	59.4%	14,639	38.1%	979	2.5%
Sullivan	7,943	54.7%	6,203	42.7%	383	2.7%

Counties that flipped from Democratic to Republican

- Rockingham (largest municipality: Derry)
