= Ross Terrio =

American politician

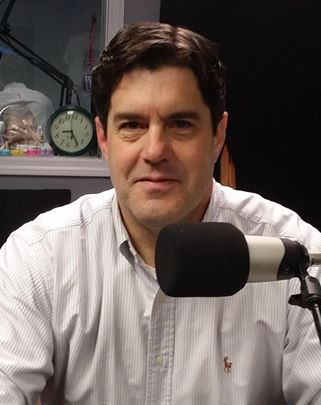
- Terrio in 2016

Member of the Manchester Board of Aldermen from the 7th ward
- Incumbent
- Assumed office January 3, 2024
- Preceded by: Mary Heath
- In office January 3, 2020 – January 3, 2022
- Preceded by: William Shea
- Succeeded by: Mary Heath

Member of the New Hampshire House of Representatives from the Hillsborough 14th district
- In office December 1, 2010 – December 5, 2012

Personal details
- Party: Republican

Ross W. Terrio is an American politician who is a member of the Republican Party from the state of New Hampshire. He has represented the 7th ward on the Manchester Board of Aldermen since January 2024, and previously from 2020 to 2022. He also served on the Manchester Board of School Committee for 3 terms from 2014 until 2020 and represented Hillsborough District 14 in the New Hampshire House of Representatives from 2010 to 2012.

== Political career ==
Between 2006 and 2014, Terrio ran for the New Hampshire House 6 times, winning only the 2010 election; he lost re-election in 2012. Terrio unsuccessfully ran for the New Hampshire Senate in 2016, 2020, and 2022, and again ran for the House in 2018. In 2019, Terrio was elected to the Manchester Board of Aldermen. He narrowly lost re-election in 2021, but won his seat back by a similarly small margin in 2023.

Terrio has filed to run for district 4 of the New Hampshire Executive Council in the 2024 election.

Terrio endorsed Mitt Romney in the 2012 Republican presidential primaries.

== Personal life ==
Terrio lives in Manchester.
