= Zoe Hill =

American politician

Member-elect of the New Hampshire House of Representatives from the Grafton 15th district
- Assuming office December 2026
- Succeeding: Thomas H. Cormen

Personal details
- Party: Democratic
- Parent: Karen Liot Hill (mother)

Zoe Hill is an American politician. A member of the Democratic Party, she is the member-elect for the Grafton 15th district of the New Hampshire House of Representatives.
