= Russell Prescott =

American politician

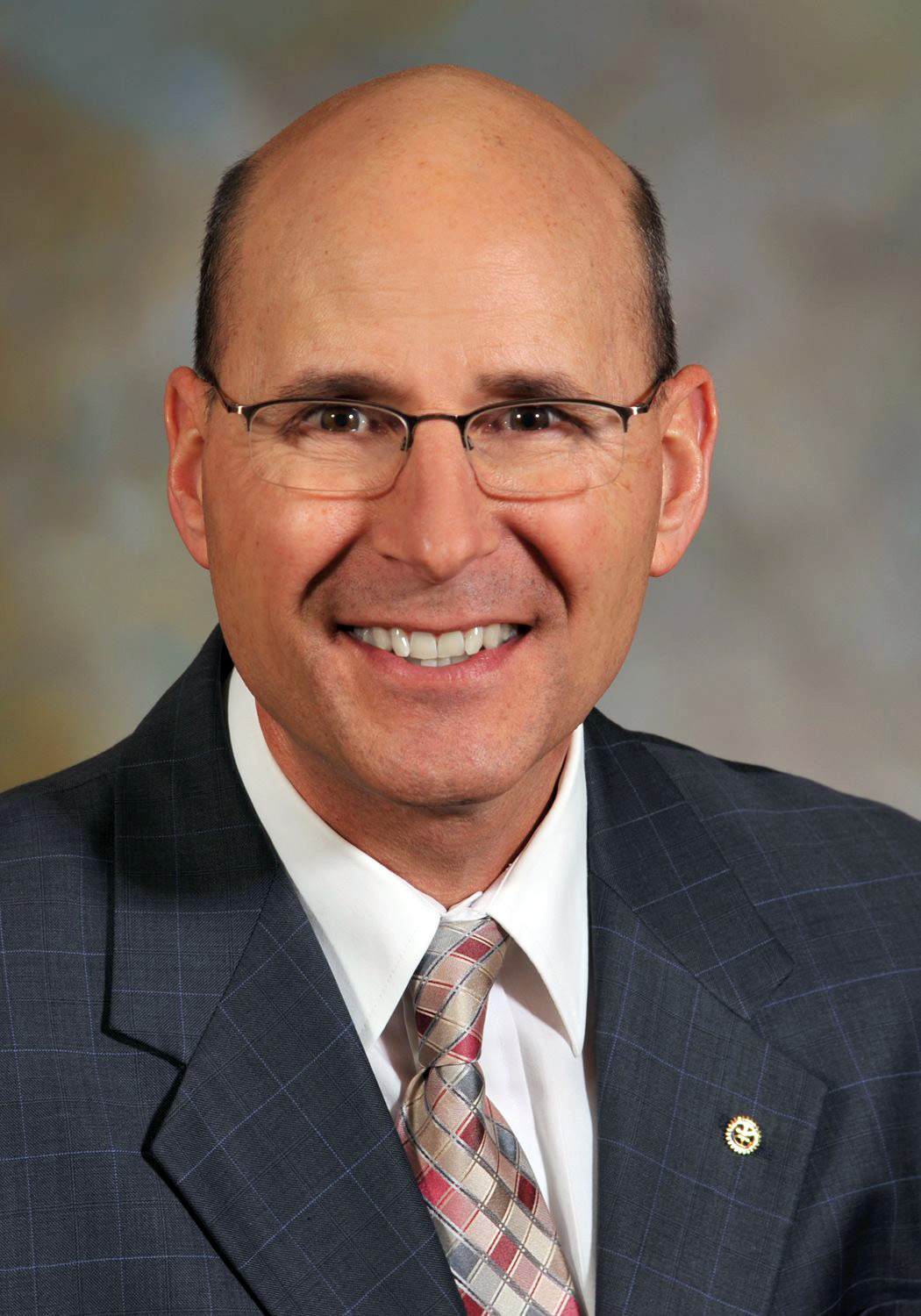

Member of the New Hampshire Executive Council from the 3rd district
- In office January 3, 2017 – January 6, 2021
- Preceded by: Chris Sununu
- Succeeded by: Janet Stevens

Member of the New Hampshire Senate
- In office December 1, 2010 – December 7, 2016
- Preceded by: Maggie Hassan
- Succeeded by: Bill Gannon
- Constituency: 23rd district
- In office December 6, 2000 – December 1, 2004
- Preceded by: Beverly Hollingworth
- Succeeded by: Maggie Hassan
- Constituency: 19th district (2000–2002); 23rd district (2002–2004)

Personal details
- Born: Russell Edward Prescott; October 19, 1960 (age 66) St. Petersburg, Florida, U.S.
- Party: Republican
- Spouse: Susan Prescott
- Education: University of South Florida (BS)

Russell Edward Prescott (born October 19, 1960) is an American businessman and politician who served on the New Hampshire Executive Council, representing the 3rd district from 2017 to 2021. A member of the Republican Party, Prescott served in the New Hampshire Senate from 2000 to 2004 and again from 2010 to 2016, representing districts in Rockingham County.

Prescott was born in St. Petersburg, Florida, but considers himself a New Hampshire native. Prescott attended Exeter High School and received a bachelor of science in mechanical engineering from the University of South Florida. He is the president and owner of R.E. Prescott Company, a manufacturer and wholesaler of water treatment systems founded by his father in 1954 and based in Exeter, New Hampshire. He ran for the Republican nomination for New Hampshire's 1st congressional district in 2022 and 2024, losing in the primary in 2022 and in the general in 2024.

== Personal life ==
Prescott lives in Kingston, New Hampshire. He has been married to his wife, Susan, for 42 years, and they have 5 children and 8 grandchildren.

New Hampshire Senate
Preceded by Richard Russman	Member of the New Hampshire Senate from the 19th district 2000–2002	Succeeded by Frank Sapareto
Preceded by Beverly Hollingworth	Member of the New Hampshire Senate from the 23rd district 2002–2004	Succeeded by Maggie Hassan
Preceded by Maggie Hassan	Member of the New Hampshire Senate from the 23rd district 2010–2016	Succeeded by Bill Gannon
