= Bill Gannon (New Hampshire politician) =

American politician

Member of the New Hampshire Senate from the 23rd district
- Incumbent
- Assumed office December 2, 2020
- Preceded by: Jon Morgan
- In office December 7, 2016 – December 4, 2018
- Preceded by: Russell Prescott
- Succeeded by: Jon Morgan

Member of the New Hampshire House of Representatives from the Rockingham 4th district
- In office December 1, 2014 – December 7, 2016
- Preceded by: Daniel Dumaine
- Succeeded by: William Polewarczyk

Personal details
- Born: October 1962 (age 64)
- Party: Republican
- Spouse: Janice
- Children: 4
- Education: Saint Anselm College (BA); Massachusetts School of Law (JD)
- Website: Campaign website Government website

William M. Gannon (born October 1962) is an American politician, attorney, and businessman. A Republican, Gannon is currently serving as senator for the 23rd district of the New Hampshire Senate and was first elected in 2016. Gannon represented the 4th Rockingham district as a member of the New Hampshire House of Representatives from 2014 to 2016.

During his first term in the Senate, Gannon served as Vice Chairman of the Transportation Committee, a member of the Judiciary Committee, and a member of the Executive Departments and Administration Committee.

Gannon is currently serving his third term as senator, he is the Chairman of the Senate Judiciary Committee and member of the Executive Departments and Administration Committee. Gannon's Senate district covers twelve towns in central and Seacoast Rockingham County bordering Massachusetts.

He and his wife Janice have four children and they live in Sandown, New Hampshire. Gannon graduated with a BA from Saint Anselm College and a JD from the Massachusetts School of Law. He is an attorney and the owner of a small construction business.
