= Raymond S. Burton =

American politician (1939–2013)

New Hampshire Executive Council District 1
- In office 1981–2013
- Preceded by: Paul M. Mayette
- Succeeded by: Joseph Kenney
- In office 1977–1979
- Preceded by: Lyle E. Hersom
- Succeeded by: Paul M. Mayette

Personal details
- Born: 13 August 1939 Burlington, Vermont
- Died: 12 November 2013 (aged 74) Bath, New Hampshire
- Party: Republican
- Education: Plymouth State University

Raymond S. "Ray" Burton (August 13, 1939 – November 12, 2013) was a New Hampshire politician who served from 1977–79 and 1981–2013 on the Executive Council as the representative of District 1, or "The North Country". Known as the "Dean of the Council", Burton, a Republican, was the longest-serving Executive Councilor in New Hampshire history. Burton also served for 22 years as a Grafton County Commissioner, representing District 2.

Burton lived in the town of Bath, New Hampshire, where he died on November 12, 2013.
