= Jon Morgan (New Hampshire politician) =

American politician

Member of the Brentwood Board of Selectmen
- In office March, 2021 – September, 2025

Member of the New Hampshire Senate from the 23rd district
- In office December 5, 2018 – December 2, 2020
- Preceded by: Bill Gannon
- Succeeded by: Bill Gannon

Personal details
- Born: September 1982 (age 44)
- Party: Democratic
- Spouse: Katie
- Children: 3
- Education: University of Notre Dame, B.A. UNC-Chapel Hill, MBA
- Website: Campaign website Official website

Jonathan Thomas Morgan (born September 1982) is a former New Hampshire politician. A Democrat, Morgan represented the 23rd district in the New Hampshire Senate for one term; he was defeated in the 2020 election by his predecessor, Republican Bill Gannon. Morgan served as vice chair of Senate Commerce, and on the Election Law & Municipal Affairs and Education & Workforce Development committees. The 23rd district covers nine towns in central Rockingham County.

In 2021, Morgan was elected to the Brentwood Board of selectmen. Morgan was reelected in 2024 to a second three-year term. However, in 2025, Morgan resigned from the Board citing a "lack of leadership".

On March 4, 2024, Morgan announced his candidacy for New Hampshire Executive Council in district 3, challenging Republican incumbent Janet Stevens. Morgan lost to Stevens in the general election, receiving 44.9% of the vote.

Prior to his election to the Senate, Morgan was a contractor for the Department of Defense, and continues to work at a cybersecurity firm based in Silicon Valley.
