= New Hampshire's 23rd State Senate district =

American legislative district

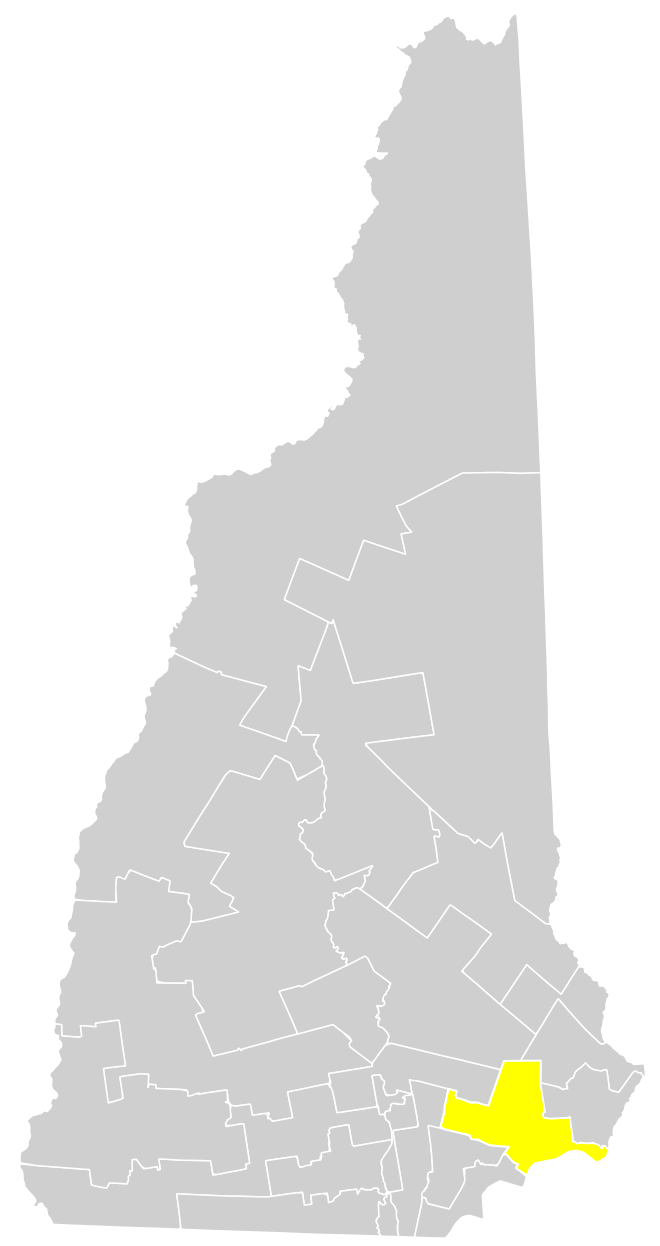
Senator
Bill Gannon; R–Sandown
- Registration: 32.7% Republican; 29.8% Democratic; 37.9% No party preference
- Demographics: 92% White; 1% Black; 1% Hispanic; 1% Asian
- Population (2020): 57,395

New Hampshire's 23rd State Senate district is one of 24 districts in the New Hampshire Senate. It has been represented by Republican Bill Gannon since 2020, following his defeat of Democratic incumbent Jon Morgan. Gannon first represented the district from 2016-2018.

== Geography ==
District 23 is based in Rockingham County. The district is entirely located within New Hampshire's 1st congressional district.

Rockingham County - 18.2%

- Brentwood
- Chester
- Danville
- East Kingston
- Epping
- Fremont
- Kensington
- Kingston
- Newton
- Sandown
- Seabrook
- South Hampton

=== Federal and statewide results ===
Results are of elections held under 2022 district lines.

Year	Office	Results
2022	Senate	Bolduc 56 – 44%
2022	Governor	Sununu 67 - 33%

== Recent election results ==
=== 2024 ===
2024 New Hampshire State Senate election, District 23
Party	Candidate	Votes	%
Republican	Bill Gannon (Incumbent)	22,670	62.36
Democratic	Brenda Oldak	13,648	37.54
Write-in		36	0.10
Total votes		36,354	100.0
Republican hold			

=== 2022 ===
2022 New Hampshire State Senate election, District 23
Party	Candidate	Votes	%
Republican	Bill Gannon (incumbent)	16,902	60.4
Democratic	Brenda Oldak	11,064	39.6
Total votes		27,966	100
Republican hold			

== Historical election results ==
All election results below took place prior to 2012 redistricting, and thus were held under different district lines.

=== 2020 ===
2020 New Hampshire State Senate election, District 23
Primary election
Party	Candidate	Votes	%
Republican	Bill Gannon	5,000	73.1
Republican	Allen Cook	1,820	26.6
Total votes		6,839	100
General election
Republican	Bill Gannon	18,627	53.3
Democratic	Jon Morgan (incumbent)	16,314	46.7
Total votes		34,941	100
Republican gain from Democratic			

=== 2018 ===
2018 New Hampshire State Senate election, District 23
Party	Candidate	Votes	%
Democratic	Jon Morgan	12,911	50.2
Republican	Bill Gannon (incumbent)	12,806	49.8
Total votes		25,717	100
Democratic gain from Republican			

=== 2016 ===
2016 New Hampshire State Senate election, District 23
Primary election
Party	Candidate	Votes	%
Republican	Bill Gannon	1,850	37.6
Republican	Bob Goodman	1,358	27.6
Republican	Maureen Barrows	923	18.8
Republican	Nancy Steenson	788	16.0
Total votes		4,919	100
General election
Republican	Bill Gannon	17,337	56.5
Democratic	Alexis Simpson	13,343	43.5
Total votes		30,680	100
Republican hold			

=== 2014 ===
2014 New Hampshire State Senate election, District 23
Party	Candidate	Votes	%
Republican	Russell Prescott (incumbent)	12,030	57.4
Democratic	Donna Schlachman	8,915	42.6
Total votes		20,945	100
Republican hold			

=== 2012 ===
2012 New Hampshire State Senate election, District 23
Primary election
Party	Candidate	Votes	%
Republican	Russell Prescott (incumbent)	3,415	77.0
Republican	Dennis Acton	1,018	23.0
Total votes		4,433	100
General election
Republican	Russell Prescott (incumbent)	15,029	53.5
Democratic	Carol Croteau	13,076	46.5
Total votes		28,105	100
Republican hold			

=== 2010 ===
2010 New Hampshire State Senate election, District 23
Party	Candidate	Votes	%
Republican	Russell Prescott	11,001	53.4
Democratic	Maggie Hassan (incumbent)	9,606	46.6
Total votes		20,607	100
Republican gain from Democratic			
