= Lorna Carlisle =

American politician

Member-elect of the New Hampshire House of Representatives from the Merrimack 5th district
- Assuming office December 2026
- Succeeding: Louise Andrus

Personal details
- Party: Democratic

Lorna Carlisle is an American politician. A member of the Democratic Party, she is the member-elect for the Merrimack 5th district of the New Hampshire House of Representatives.
