= 2008 New Hampshire gubernatorial election =

- November 4, 2008
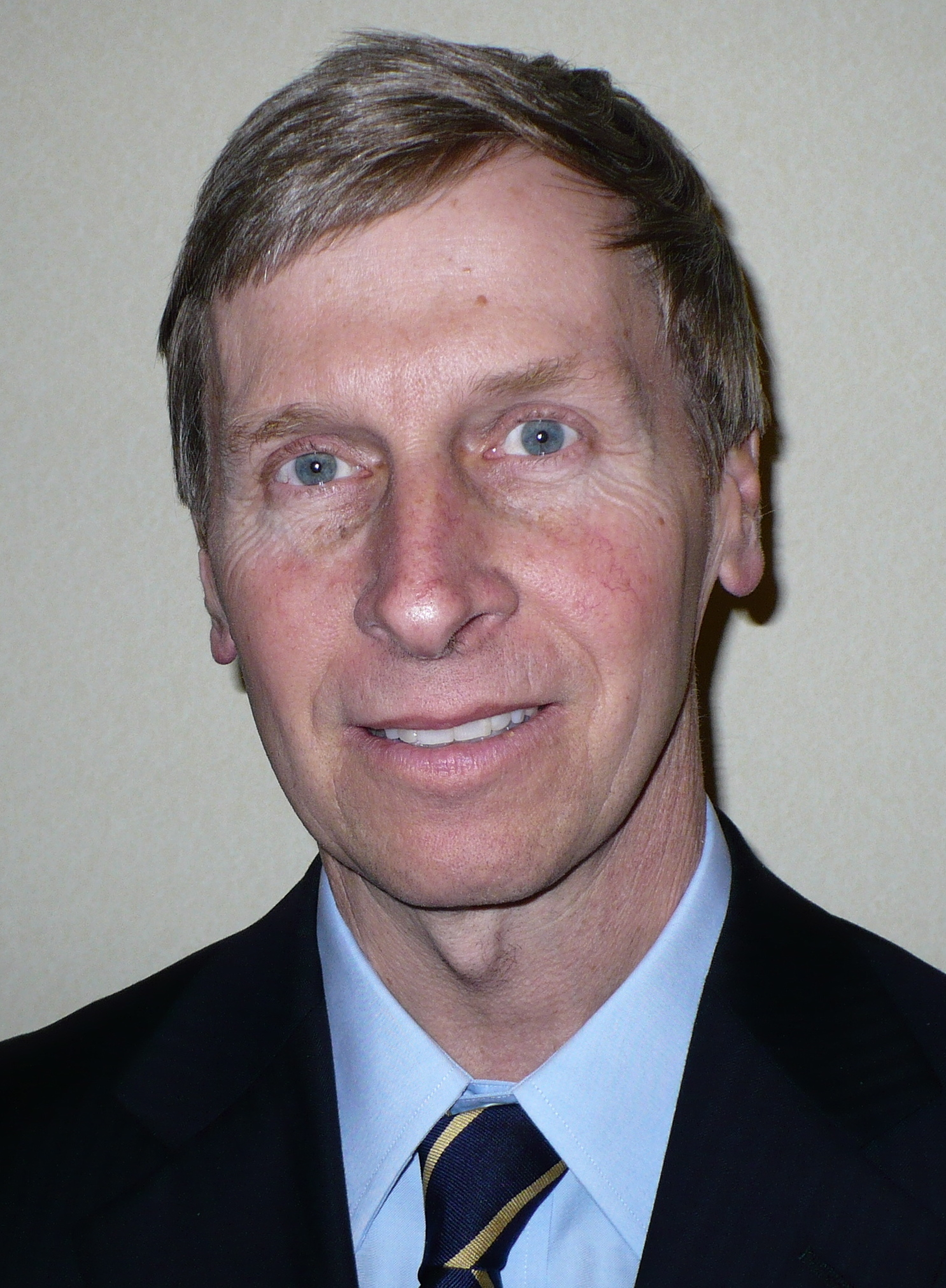

Nominee	John Lynch	Joseph Kenney
Party	Democratic	Republican
Popular vote	479,042	188,555
Percentage	70.15%	27.61%
- Lynch: 40–50% 50–60% 60–70% 70–80% 80–90% >90% Kenney: 50–60%
Governor before election
John Lynch
Democratic
Elected Governor
John Lynch
Democratic

The 2008 New Hampshire gubernatorial election, took place on November 4, 2008. Incumbent governor John Lynch won his third term with a landslide victory over Republican opponent Joseph Kenney.

== Democratic primary ==
=== Candidates ===
- John Lynch, incumbent governor of New Hampshire
- Kathryn Forry

=== Results ===
Democratic primary results
Party	Candidate	Votes	%
Democratic	John Lynch (incumbent)	44,549	90.69
Democratic	Kathryn Forry	4,444	9.05
Democratic	Write-ins	131	0.27
Total votes		49,124	100.00

== Republican primary ==
=== Candidates ===
- Joseph Kenney, New Hampshire state senator

=== Results ===
Republican primary results
Party	Candidate	Votes	%
Republican	Joseph Kenney	49,235	92.69
Republican	Write-ins	3,885	7.31
Total votes		53,120	100.00

== General election ==
=== Predictions ===
Source	Ranking	As of
The Cook Political Report	Safe D	October 16, 2008
Rothenberg Political Report	Safe D	November 2, 2008
Sabato's Crystal Ball	Safe D	November 3, 2008
Real Clear Politics	Safe D	November 4, 2008

=== Polling ===
Poll source	Date(s) administered	John Lynch (D)	Joseph Kenney (R)
Survey USA	October 29–30, 2008	65%	28%
Survey USA	October 4–5, 2008	67%	24%
American Research Group	June 13–17, 2008	65%	21%
University of New Hampshire	April 25–30, 2008	68%	17%
American Research Group	March 21, 2008	62%	20%
American Research Group	December 21, 2007	48%	32%

=== Results ===

2008 New Hampshire gubernatorial election
Party	Candidate	Votes	%	±%
Democratic	John Lynch (incumbent)	479,042	70.15%	−3.86%
Republican	Joseph Kenney	188,555	27.61%	+1.78%
Libertarian	Susan Newell	14,987	2.19%	+2.01%
Write-in		326	0.05%	N/A
Total votes		682,910	100.00%	N/A
Democratic hold				

==== By county ====
County	John Lynch Democratic		Joe Kenney Republican		Various candidates Other parties		Margin		Total votes cast
County	#	%	#	%	#	%	#	%	Total votes cast
Belknap	22,212	68.1%	9,858	30.2%	539	1.6%	12,354	37.9%	32,609
Carroll	17,488	62.2%	10,009	35.6%	610	2.1%	7,479	26.6%	28,107
Cheshire	29,663	72.8%	9,827	24.1%	1,272	3.2%	19,836	48.7%	40,762
Coos	11,588	73.9%	3,742	23.9%	353	2.2%	7,846	50.0%	15,683
Grafton	34,654	73.3%	11,328	24.0%	1,287	2.7%	23,236	49.3%	47,179
Hillsborough	135,189	68.7%	56,831	28.9%	4,672	2.3%	78,358	39.8%	196,692
Merrimack	58,410	74.8%	18,222	23.3%	1,470	1.9%	40,188	51.5%	78,102
Rockingham	108,201	67.3%	49,158	30.6%	3,362	2.1%	59,043	36.7%	160,721
Strafford	45,878	74.8%	14,190	23.1%	1,265	2.1%	31,688	51.7%	61,333
Sullivan	15,849	73.0%	5,390	24.8%	463	2.2%	10,459	48.2%	21,702
Totals	479,042	70.1%	188,555	27.6%	15,313	2.2%	290,487	42.5%	682,910
