= Karen Liot Hill =

American politician

Member of the New Hampshire Executive Council from the 2nd district
- Incumbent
- Assumed office January 9, 2025
- Preceded by: Cinde Warmington

Personal details
- Born: December 1978 (age 47) Landaul, France
- Party: Republican (before 2004); Democratic (2004–present)
- Spouse: Andy Hill (m. 2016; div. 2017)
- Children: 2; including Zoe
- Education: Dartmouth College (BA)

Karen Liot Hill is an American politician who has been a member of the Executive Council of New Hampshire since 2025. She is the highest ranking Democrat in the New Hampshire state government. She previously served as mayor of Lebanon, New Hampshire, and was a Lebanon City Council member from 2005 to March 2025.

== Biography ==
Liot Hill was born in France and raised on Long Island in New York by her father after her mother's early death from cervical cancer. She earned a Bachelor of Arts degree from Dartmouth College, majoring in government and minoring in education. She worked as a paralegal, piano teacher and an on-air personality at WWOD, an adult album alternative broadcasting radio station. Liot Hill and her former husband, Andy Hill, owned and operated the Lebanon Diner, which closed in 2020 due to challenges associated with the COVID-19 pandemic. Liot Hill has twice been arrested for driving while intoxicated. In 2010 she pleaded guilty and was convicted of grossly negligent operation. In 2018 she was charged with driving while intoxicated, a Class B misdemeanor.

=== Political career ===
==== Lebanon City Council ====
Liot Hill has said that she was a Republican in her youth, and become involved in the Democratic Party during Howard Dean's 2004 presidential campaign. In 2004, Liot Hill became a registered Democrat and successfully ran the campaigns for four Democratic state representative candidates in Lebanon. In 2005, she was elected to serve on the Lebanon City Council. and was the mayor of Lebanon from 2008 to 2009. While she was on the city council, she prioritized sustainability, social justice, economic vitality, affordable housing, transparency, and inclusiveness. Karen served as Lebanon’s Mayor in 2008-09, during which time she signed onto the US Mayors' Climate Protection Agreement on behalf of the people of Lebanon.

==== Grafton County Treasurer ====
Liot Hill was elected treasurer for Grafton County in 2016 and re-elected in 2018, 2020, and 2022. She was succeeded by Michael Cryans.

==== Executive Council of New Hampshire ====
Liot Hill was elected to the Executive Council of New Hampshire in November 2024 with 57% percent of the vote, beating perennial candidate Republican Kim Strathdee. Liot Hill was endorsed by the Planned Parenthood New Hampshire Action Fund. Liot Hill missed two deadlines for her campaign finance reports, October 30 and November 13, 2024, respectively, and eventually filed them with the New Hampshire Secretary of State's office on December 12, 2024. Late filings are not uncommon in New Hampshire.

On August 14, 2025, Joseph Sweeney, the third-highest ranking Republican in the New Hampshire House, launched an effort to impeach Liot Hill, claiming she improperly used her office to help a private law firm recruit clients. Liot Hill has said she has been targeted because she is the sole Democrat on the Executive Council, and that referring a constituent to a third party is not unusual for councilors.

== Political views ==
In 2019, Liot Hill stated that she had gone without health insurance for almost 10 years because she finds it unaffordable. Liot Hill is a supportive ally of the LGBTQ+ community and an advocate for abortion rights. As County Treasurer, she prioritized the responsible use of taxpayer dollars, and prudent oversight of county fiscal matters.

As Executive Councilor, Karen has identified abortion rights, housing, childcare, public education, and climate change as her priority issues. She credits the death of her mother due to cervical cancer, when Karen was six years old, as the reason for her support for women's health funding.

== See also ==
- 2024 New Hampshire Executive Council election
