= Kris Roberts =

American politician

Member of the New Hampshire House of Representatives from the Cheshire 4 district
- In office 2004 -

Personal details
- Born: August 9, 1954 (age 72) Evanston, Wyoming
- Party: Democratic Keene Board of Education 2001-2007, 2010-present; Keene City Council 2008-present
- Spouse: Lucille
- Education: Keene State College

Kris Edward Roberts is a former Democratic member of the New Hampshire House of Representatives, who represented the Cheshire 3rd District from 2004 to 2012.
