= Charles Weed =

American politician

Member of New Hampshire House of Representatives for Cheshire 16
- In office 2000–2014

Personal details
- Born: April 1, 1943 (age 83)
- Party: Democratic
- Education: Middlebury College; University of Denver; University of Massachusetts

Charles (Chuck) F. Weed (born April 1, 1943) is an American politician. He represented Cheshire 16th district on the New Hampshire House of Representatives from 2000 to 2014. He is Treasurer for the Cheshire County Democratic Party. Weed worked on presidential campaigns including Jesse Jackson, John Edwards and Ralph Nader. In the New Hampshire General Court, he introduced a bill to introduce an option for none of the above. He proposed to increase beer tax.
