= Louise Andrus =

American politician

Member of the New Hampshire House of Representatives from the Merrimack 5th district
- Incumbent
- Assumed office December 7, 2022
- Succeeded by: Lorna Carlisle (elect)

Member of the New Hampshire House of Representatives from the Merrimack 1st district
- In office December 2, 2020 – December 7, 2022

Personal details
- Party: Republican
- Spouse: Ted
- Children: 3

Louise Andrus is an American politician. She serves as a Republican member for the Merrimack 5th district of the New Hampshire House of Representatives.

Andrus resides in Salisbury, New Hampshire, with her husband Ted. She has three children.
