= David Meader =

American politician

Member of the New Hampshire House of Representatives from the Cheshire 6 district
- In office 2016 – December 2020
- Succeeded by: Dru Fox

Personal details
- Born: October 26, 1949 (age 76) Keene, New Hampshire, U.S.
- Party: Democratic

David Meader (born October 26, 1949) is an American politician in the state of New Hampshire. He is a member of the New Hampshire House of Representatives, sitting as a Democrat from the Cheshire 6 district, having been first elected in 2016. He previously served from 1996 to 2004 and 2008–2012.
