= Michael Cryans =

American politician

Member of the New Hampshire Executive Council from the 1st district
- In office January 2, 2019 – January 6, 2021
- Preceded by: Joseph Kenney
- Succeeded by: Joseph Kenney

Treasurer of Grafton County
- Incumbent
- Assumed office 2025
- Preceded by: Karen Liot Hill

Personal details
- Born: Littleton, New Hampshire, U.S.
- Party: Democratic
- Spouse: Julie
- Children: 2
- Education: Springfield College (BA)

Michael Cryans is an American politician and former banker formerly serving as a member of the Executive Council of New Hampshire from 1st district.

== Early life and education ==
Cryans was born in Littleton, New Hampshire. After graduating from Littleton High School, he earned a Bachelor of Arts degree in Physical Education from Springfield College.

== Career ==
After graduating from college, Cryans returned to Littleton High School as a teacher before starting a career in banking. Cryans served as Vice President of the Dartmouth Banking Company and later worked as executive director of Headrest, Inc., a substance abuse rehabilitation facility located in Lebanon, New Hampshire.

A Democrat, Cryans took office on January 2, 2019, after defeating Republican incumbent Joseph Kenney in the 2018 general election. He had previously sought the seat in 2014 and 2016, but lost both times to Kenney.

== Personal life ==
Cryans lives in Hanover, New Hampshire with his wife, Julie. They have two sons and two grandchildren.
