= Debora Pignatelli =

American politician (born 1947)

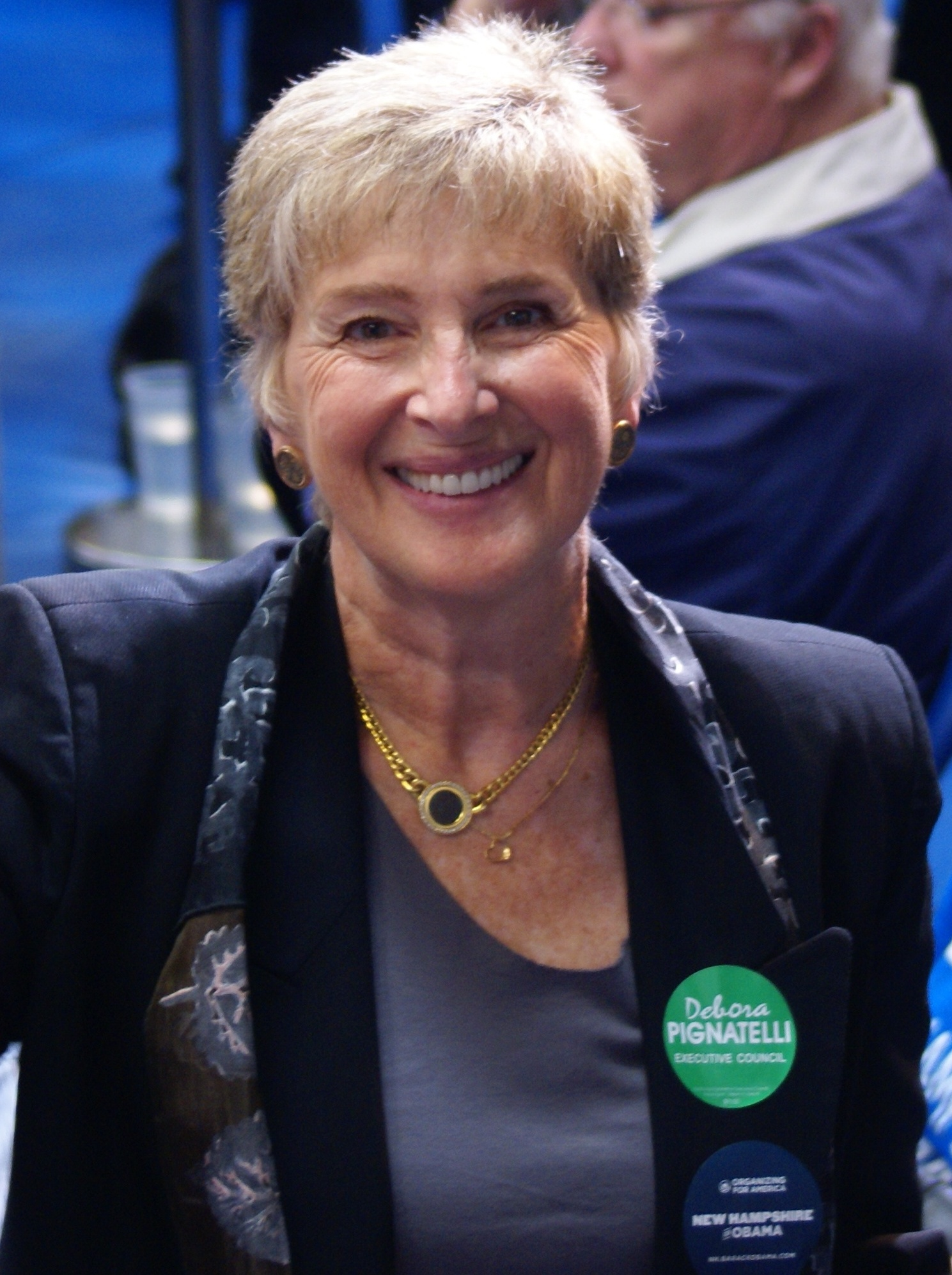
- Pignatelli in 2012

Member of the New Hampshire Executive Council from the 5th district
- In office January 3, 2019 – January 7, 2021
- Preceded by: David Wheeler
- Succeeded by: David Wheeler
- In office January 3, 2013 – January 8, 2015
- Preceded by: David Wheeler
- Succeeded by: David Wheeler
- In office January 6, 2005 – January 6, 2011
- Preceded by: David Wheeler
- Succeeded by: David Wheeler

Personal details
- Born: October 25, 1947 (age 78) Hoboken, New Jersey, U.S.
- Party: Democratic
- Education: University of Denver (BA); Northeastern University

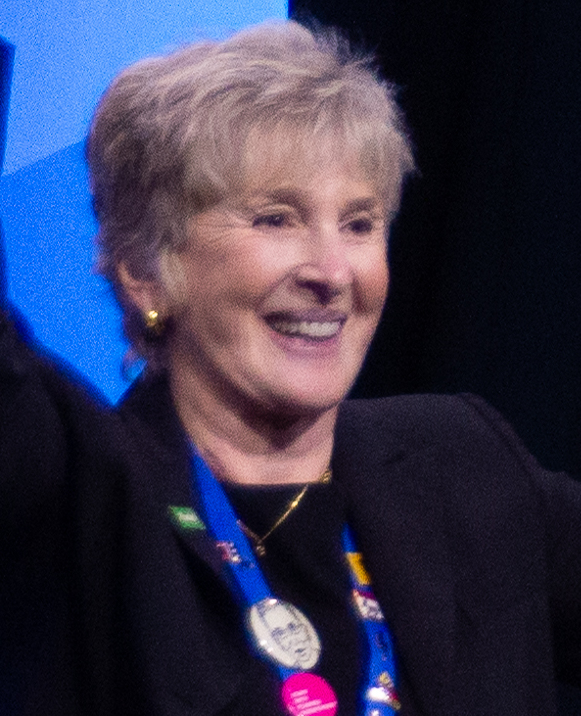
Pignatelli in 2019

Debora B. Pignatelli (born October 25, 1947) is an American politician. A Democrat, she is the former New Hampshire Executive Council member for District Five.

Pignatelli was born in Hoboken, New Jersey and lives in Nashua, New Hampshire. She received her bachelor's degree from the University of Denver. She also went to Northeastern University. Pignatelli worked for the Nashua Public Housing Authority as director of tenant services and as Executive Director for the Nashua Girl's Club. Pignatelli served in the New Hampshire House of Representatives from 1986 to 1992. She then served in the New Hampshire Senate from 1992 to 2002. Pignatelli served in the New Hampshire Executive Council from 2004 to 2010 and from 2012 to 2014.

== Electoral history ==
2020 NH executive council election district 5

(R) Dave Wheeler 50.5%

(D) Deborah Pignatelli 49.5%

2018 NH executive council election district 5

(D) Deborah Pignatelli 50.5%

(R) Dave Wheeler 46.5%

(L) Brian Chabot 2.9%

Election
Majority
