= John Stephen (New Hampshire politician) =

American politician

Member of the New Hampshire Executive Council from the 4th district
- Incumbent
- Assumed office January 9, 2025
- Preceded by: Ted Gatsas

Personal details
- Party: Republican
- Education: University of New Hampshire (BS); Detroit College of Law (JD)

John A. Stephen is an American politician who has represented the 4th district on the New Hampshire Executive Council since 2025. He was previously the Republican nominee for Governor of New Hampshire in 2010. Stephen lost re-election to the Executive Council in the 2026 election.

== Biography ==
Stephen has served as commissioner of the New Hampshire Department of Health and Human Services, deputy commissioner of the New Hampshire Department of Safety, assistant Attorney General of New Hampshire, and assistant Hillsborough County attorney.

During his campaign for Executive Council, Stephen was criticized for his involvement with abuse allegations at the New Hampshire youth detention center during his time as NH DHHS commissioner.

Stephen also founded a healthcare consulting group calling the Stephen Group.

Stephen is married and has two daughters.

== Electoral history ==
2010 New Hampshire gubernatorial election
| Party | Candidate | Votes | % | ±% |
|---|---|---|---|---|
| Democratic | John Lynch (incumbent) | 240,346 | 52.63% | −17.57% |
| Republican | John Stephen | 205,616 | 45.03% | +17.43% |
| Libertarian | John Babiarz | 10,089 | 2.21% | +0.02% |
| Write-in | | 537 | <0.01% | N/A |
| Total votes | | 456,588 | 100.00% | N/A |
| Democratic hold | | | | |

2024 Executive Council Republican primary results
| Party | Candidate | Votes | % |
|---|---|---|---|
| Republican | John Stephen | 9,312 | 36.85% |
| Republican | Robert Burns | 5,748 | 22.75% |
| Republican | Terese Bastarache | 4,167 | 16.49% |
| Republican | John Reagan | 3,758 | 14.87% |
| Republican | Ross Terrio | 1,295 | 5.12% |
| Republican | Ryan Terrell | 908 | 3.59% |
| Democratic | Jim O'Connell (write-in) | 33 | 0.13% |
| Write-in | | 51 | 0.20% |
| Total votes | | 25,272 | 100% |

2024 New Hampshire's 4th Executive Council district election
| Party | Candidate | Votes | % |
|---|---|---|---|
| Republican | John Stephen | 77,903 | 53.78% |
| Democratic | Jim O'Connell | 66,842 | 46.14% |
| Write-in | | 111 | 0.08% |
| Total votes | | 144,856 | 100% |
