= Local government in New Hampshire =

Local government in New Hampshire consists of county, school district, and municipal governments.

== County ==
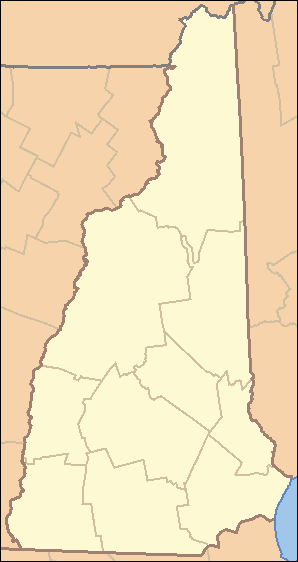

There are 10 counties in the state of New Hampshire responsible for local sheriff services, nursing homes, and prisons. Each county is governed by a board of commissioners. Similar to the rest of New England, county governments in New Hampshire are weak and have relatively few responsibilities compared to states in other regions. Most local government functions are performed at the town and city level.

== Municipal ==
New Hampshire contains 235 incorporated towns and cities. Thirteen are cities and 222 are towns. Towns and cities are treated identically under state law. The primary difference is that cities are former towns who dropped the town meeting form of government in favor of a city form through special act of the New Hampshire General Court. Since 1979, however, any town or city can change its form of government by creation of a new charter and voter approval of the new municipal charter. Cities and towns are nominally divisions of the state. However, as in the rest of New England, the laws governing their authority are very broadly construed.

Collectively, these 234 municipalities cover the vast majority of, but not all of, the state's territory. There are some unincorporated areas in the sparsely populated northern region of the state. Most of the unincorporated areas are in Coos County, the state's northernmost county. Carroll and Grafton counties also contain small amounts of unincorporated territory. This territory includes unincorporated townships, some of which are known as grants, purchases and locations. Thornton Gore is part of the town of Thornton. The remaining seven counties in the state are entirely incorporated (Grafton County was also fully incorporated at one time, but lost that status when the town of Livermore disincorporated). Fewer than 250 of the state's residents live in unincorporated areas.

- The largest municipality in New Hampshire, by population (as of 2023), is the city of Manchester (pop. 115,415).
- The largest which is a town and not a city is Derry (pop. 33,109).
- The smallest which is a city and not a town is Franklin (pop. 8,477).
- The smallest incorporated municipality overall is the town of Hart's Location (pop. 41).
- The largest municipality by land area is the town of Pittsburg (282 square miles (730 km^{2})).
- The smallest is the town of New Castle (0.83 square miles (2.1 km^{2})).

== See also ==
- New England town
- List of places in New Hampshire
