= Janet Stevens =

American politician

Member of the New Hampshire Executive Council from the 3rd district
- Incumbent
- Assumed office January 1, 2021
- Preceded by: Russell Prescott

Personal details
- Born: 1961 or 1962 (age 63–64) Needham, Massachusetts, U.S.
- Party: Republican
- Education: University of Massachusetts, Amherst (BS)

Janet Lannan Stevens (born 1961/1962) is an American politician and communications professional from the state of New Hampshire. A member of the Republican Party, she has represented the 3rd district on the New Hampshire Executive Council since 2021.

== Professional career ==
Stevens owns a communications firm specializing in media relations and marketing. Before winning elected office, she was appointed by New Hampshire governor Chris Sununu to the New Hampshire Board of Mental Health Practice.

== Political career ==
Stevens ran unsuccessfully for the New Hampshire House of Representatives in 2016, losing to Democrats Mindi Messmer and Kate Murray. She first ran for the Executive Council in 2020, winning the Republican primary with a low plurality and defeating Messmer in the general election. Stevens was re-elected in 2022, defeating Hampton Budget Committee chair Katherine Harake as well as former state senator Jon Morgan in the 2024 election.

== Personal life ==
Stevens lives in Rye. She is married. She and her husband, Bob, have two children: Blaine and Colby.
