= Dave Wheeler =

American politician

Member of the New Hampshire Executive Council from the 5th district
- Incumbent
- Assumed office January 1, 2021
- Preceded by: Debora Pignatelli
- In office January 3, 2015 – January 3, 2019
- Preceded by: Debora Pignatelli
- Succeeded by: Debora Pignatelli
- In office January 6, 2011 – January 3, 2013
- Preceded by: Debora Pignatelli
- Succeeded by: Debora Pignatelli
- In office January 4, 2001 – January 6, 2005
- Preceded by: Bernard Streeter
- Succeeded by: Debora Pignatelli

Member of the New Hampshire Senate from the 11th district
- In office December 2, 1992 – December 2, 1998
- Preceded by: Charles Bass
- Succeeded by: Mark Fernald

Member of the New Hampshire House of Representatives
- In office 1988–1992

Personal details
- Born: April 1, 1959 (age 67) Milford, New Hampshire, U.S.
- Party: Republican

David K. Wheeler is an American politician from the state of New Hampshire. A member of the Republican Party, he has represented the 5th district on the New Hampshire Executive Council since 2021, and previously from 2001 to 2005, 2011 and 2013, and 2015 to 2019. He also represented the 11th district in the New Hampshire Senate from 1992 to 1998 and served in the New Hampshire House of Representatives from 1988 to 1992.

== Political career ==
Wheeler was elected to the New Hampshire House in 1998, and later the New Hampshire Senate in 1992. He was re-elected in 1994 and 1996, but lost re-election to Democrat Mark Fernald in 1998. Wheeler was elected to the Executive Council in 2000, defeating state representative Donnalee Lozeau in the Republican primary and Democrat Keigh Regli in the general election. Wheeler was re-elected in 2002, defeating former state representative Michael Blaisdell in the general election. In 2004, Wheeler lost re-election to former state senator Debora Pignatelli; this would be the first of seven faceoffs between the two that would occur over the next sixteen years. Wheeler unsuccessfully challenged Pignatelli in 2006 and 2008 before finally unseating her in 2010, but she won another rematch between the two in 2012. Pignatelli did not seek re-election in 2014 and Wheeler defeated at-large Nashua alder Diane Sheehan to win his seat back; he then fought back a challenge from nonprofit director Dan Weeks in 2016. However, Pignatelli returned in 2018 and unseated Wheeler, though Wheeler prevailed in their 2020 rematch. He defeated at-large Nashua alder Shoshanna Kelly in 2022 to win an eighth non-consecutive term.

Wheeler endorsed Ted Cruz in the 2016 Republican Party presidential primaries.

== Personal life ==
Wheeler lives in Milford.
