= Joseph Kenney =

American politician

Joe Kenney

Member of the New Hampshire Executive Council from the 1st district
- Incumbent
- Assumed office January 6, 2021
- Preceded by: Michael Cryans
- In office March 12, 2014 – January 2, 2019
- Preceded by: Ray Burton
- Succeeded by: Michael Cryans

Member of the New Hampshire Senate from the 3rd district
- In office December 4, 2002 – December 3, 2008
- Preceded by: Carl Johnson
- Succeeded by: William Denley

Member of the New Hampshire House of Representatives from the 6th Carroll district
- In office December 7, 1994 – December 4, 2002
- Preceded by: Gordon Wiggin
- Succeeded by: Mark McConkey; David Babson; Harry Merrow

Personal details
- Born: July 12, 1960 (age 66) Melrose, Massachusetts, U.S.
- Party: Republican
- Education: University of New Hampshire, Durham (BA)

Joseph D. "Joe" Kenney (born July 12, 1960) is an American politician and member of the Republican Party who has represented District 1 of the Executive Council of New Hampshire since 2021, previously representing the same district from 2014 to 2019. He previously served as a member of the New Hampshire Senate, representing the 3rd District from 2003 to 2009, and as a member of the New Hampshire House of Representatives from 1995 until 2003.

Kenney ran for Governor of New Hampshire in 2008 and lost to incumbent Democratic Governor John Lynch in the general election.

His former State Senate seat re-opened in February 2009, when his successor William Denley resigned. However, Kenney was unable to run because he had been called up for active service with the United States Marine Corps.

Kenney defeated Democrat Mike Cryans in a special election held in March 2014 to fill the District 1 Executive Council seat vacated after long-time Republican incumbent Raymond S. Burton died in November 2013. Kenney defeated Cryans again in 2014 and 2016, lost re-election in their fourth rematch in 2018, but won back his seat in 2020.

== Early life, education, and career ==
Kenney grew up in a small business family in Wakefield, New Hampshire, and continues to live in Wakefield with his wife and two children. At a young age Kenney worked as an auction runner at his family's auction barn in Rochester, New Hampshire, and picked blueberries during the summer at Daily's Blueberry Mountain Farm in Brookfield to help pay for his grammar school clothes. He went on to become a pot-washer, cook and head cook at Pierce Camp Birchmont in Wolfeboro, where he worked for nine summers throughout high school and college. He attended Spaulding High School in Rochester and hitch-hiked 20 miles (32 km) to basketball practice to play on the varsity team during the winter. He graduated from the University of New Hampshire, majoring in history and minoring in small business management. He traveled as a college junior with a program called Semester at Sea, a college-accredited program which allowed him to take international college courses aboard the SS Universe while traveling around the world. He was a Division I NCAA soccer player.

=== United States Marine Corps ===
Kenney joined the United States Marine Corps in 1980, and continues to serve as a Marine S-2 Officer with the 25th Marines at Fort Devens, Massachusetts. In February 1989, he was pulled from Officer's Candidate School in Quantico, Virginia, and honored by President George H. W. Bush at the White House for his work as an enlisted Marine stationed in Washington, DC for collecting over a hundred thousand toys for needy kids in the metropolitan area. On January 2, 2010, he was recognized by the Boston Celtics at center court with the "Heroes Among Us Award" and subsequently went back to Afghanistan to finish his tour. He is a veteran of three conflicts: the Persian Gulf War, the Iraq War and the Afghanistan War.

Party political offices
Preceded by Jim Coburn	Republican nominee for Governor of New Hampshire; 2008	Succeeded by John Stephen
