= Executive Council of New Hampshire =

Statewide advisory and control body in New Hampshire

Executive Council of the State of New Hampshire Governor's Council
- State seal
- Government of New Hampshire
- Type: Non-executive advisory body Advice and Consent
- Seat: State House, Concord, New Hampshire
- Nominator: Nominating petition
- Appointer: Popular vote
- Term length: Two years, no term limits
- Constituting instrument: Constitution of New Hampshire
- Formation: January 21, 1680 (346 years ago)
- Salary: $18,699 per year
- Website: www.council.nh.gov

The Executive Council of the State of New Hampshire (colloquially referred to as the Governor's Council) is the executive body of New Hampshire in the United States. The Executive Council advises the Governor on all matters and provides a check on the governor's power. While the governor retains the right to veto legislation passed by the New Hampshire General Court and commands the New Hampshire National Guard, the council has overruling power on pardons, contracts with a value greater than $10,000, and nominations. The Executive Council Chambers have been located in the New Hampshire State House since the chambers were added to the capitol in 1909.

== Construction ==
The Executive Council is made up of five councilors elected for two-year terms by their respective districts. The General Court divides the state into five districts by population, as needed for the public good, with each district containing approximately 275,500 residents.

The Governor has the sole power and authority to convene meetings of the council at his or her discretion. The council does not have the power or authority to convene itself. The governor with, or a majority of, the council "may and shall, from time to time hold a council, for ordering and directing the affairs of the state, according to the laws of the land." (Part II. Art. 62 of the N.H. Constitution)

Members of the council may be impeached by the House, and tried by the Senate for bribery, corruption, malpractice, or maladministration. (Part II. Art 63)

The constitution provides for the governor and council to be compensated for their services, from time to time, by such grants as the general courts shall think reasonable. (Part II. Art. 58) Each councilor is provided a salary of $18,699 (FY 2025). The councilor for District 1 receives a $5,800 stipend in lieu of expenses while the other districts' councilors receive $4,000.

=== Districts ===
As of 2023, the state is divided into five districts:
District	Counties	Towns and cities
1	Belknap, Carroll, Coos, Grafton, Merrimack and Strafford	Alton, Belmont, Center Harbor, Gilford, Gilmanton, Laconia, Meredith, New Hampton, Sanbornton, Tilton, Atkinson and Gilmanton Academy Grant, Bean's Grant, Bean's Purchase, Berlin, Cambridge, Chandler's Purchase, Clarksville, Colebrook, Columbia, Crawford's Purchase, Cutt's Grant, Dalton, Dix's Grant, Dixville, Dummer, Errol, Erving's Location, Gorham, Green's Grant, Hadley's Purchase, Jefferson, Kilkenny, Lancaster, Low and Burbank's Grant, Martin's Location, Milan, Millsfield, Northumberland, Odell, Pinkham's Grant, Pittsburg, Randolph, Sargent's Purchase, Second College Grant, Shelburne, Stark, Stewartstown, Stratford, Success, Thompson and Meserve's Purchase, Wentworth Location, Whitefield, Alexandria, Bridgewater, Bristol, Hebron, Livermore, Waterville Valley, Danbury, Franklin, Hill, Northfield, Dover, Durham, Farmington, Madbury, Middleton, Milton, New Durham, Rochester, Rollinsford, and Somersworth
2	Sullivan, Merrimack, Hillsborough, Grafton, Coos and Cheshire	Alstead, Chesterfield, Dublin, Gilsum, Harrisville, Hinsdale, Keene, Marlborough, Marlow, Nelson, Roxbury, Sullivan, Surry, Walpole, Westmoreland, Winchester, Carroll, Ashland, Bath, Benton, Bethlehem, Campton, Canaan, Dorchester, Easton, Ellsworth, Enfield, Franconia, Grafton, Groton, Hanover, Haverhill, Holderness, Landaff, Lincoln, Lisbon, Littleton, Lyman, Lyme, Monroe, Orange, Orford, Piermont, Plymouth, Rumney, Sugar Hill, Thornton, Warren, Wentworth, and Woodstock, Hancock, Peterborough, Sharon, Andover, Boscawen, Bow, Bradford, Canterbury, Concord, Henniker, Hopkinton, Newbury, New London, Salisbury, Sutton, Warner, Webster, and Wilmot, Acworth, Charlestown, Claremont, Cornish, Croydon, Grantham, Langdon, Newport, Plainfield, Springfield, Sunapee, and Unity.
3	Rockingham, Hillsborough	Atkinson, Brentwood, Chester, Danville, Derry, East Kingston, Epping, Exeter, Fremont, Greenland, Hampstead, Hampton, Hampton Falls, Kensington, Kingston, New Castle, Newfields, Newington, Newmarket, Newton, North Hampton, Plaistow, Portsmouth, Raymond, Rye, Salem, Sandown, Seabrook, South Hampton, Stratham, Windham and Pelham.
4	Belknap, Hillsborough, Merrimack, Rockingham and Strafford	Barnstead, Bedford, Goffstown, Manchester, Allenstown, Chichester, Epsom, Hooksett, Loudon, Pembroke, Pittsfield, Auburn, Candia, Deerfield, Londonderry, Northwood, Nottingham, Barrington, Lee and Strafford.
5	Cheshire, Merrimack, Hillsborough and Sullivan	Fitzwilliam, Jaffrey, Richmond, Rindge, Stoddard, Swanzey, Troy, Dunbarton, Amherst, Antrim, Bennington, Brookline, Deering, Francestown, Greenfield, Greenville, Hillsborough, Hollis, Hudson, Litchfield, Lyndeborough, Mason, Merrimack, Milford, Mont Vernon, Nashua, New Boston, New Ipswich, Temple, Weare, Wilton, Windsor, Goshen, Lempster, and Washington.

=== Current members ===
District	Name	Start	Party
1	Joseph Kenney	January 7, 2021	Republican
2	Karen Liot Hill	January 9, 2025	Democratic
3	Janet Stevens	January 7, 2021	Republican
4	John Stephen	January 9, 2025	Republican
5	Dave Wheeler	January 7, 2021	Republican

== Powers ==
The Governor and Council, together, have the authority and responsibility over the administration of the affairs of the state as defined in the New Hampshire Constitution, the New Hampshire Revised Statutes Annotated, and the advisory opinions of the New Hampshire Supreme Court and the New Hampshire Attorney General. The General Court has also designated specific powers to the governor and council in RSA Chapter 4. Other powers of the council derive from the NH Constitution:

- The governor and council approve the spending of a significant portion of the state's budget.
- The governor and council serve as the watchdogs of the state treasury to ensure state departments and agencies do not spend more than they were allowed to, or use the money for unauthorized purposes. (Part II. Art. 56)
- The governor and council approve state departments and agencies' receipt and expenditures of funds and gifts, budgetary transfers within a department, and all contracts with a value of $10,000 or more.
- The governor and council nominates and appoints all "judicial officers, the attorney general, and all officers of the navy, and general and field officers of the militia." (Part II. Art. 46)
- The governor and council "have a negative on each other, both in the nominations and appointments," which shall be signed by the governor and council. (Part II. Art. 47)
- The power of pardoning offenses "shall be in the governor, by and with the advice of council," except for persons convicted of offenses before the senate by impeachment of the house or persons whose offenses have yet been adjudicated. (Part II. Art. 52)
- When a majority of the council and the attorney general reasonably believes "the governor is unable to discharge the powers and duties of his office by reason of physical or mental incapacity, but the governor is unwilling or unable to transmit his written declaration to such effect...," the attorney general shall petition the NH Supreme Court, which will make such determination by a preponderance of the evidence. (Part II Art. 49-a)
- The governor with advice of council has "the full power and authority, in the recess of the general court, to prorogue the same from time to time, not exceeding ninety days, in any one recess of said court; and during the sessions of said court, to adjourn or prorogue it to any time the two houses may desire, and to call it together sooner than the time to which it may be adjourned, or prorogued, if the welfare of the state should require the same." (Part II. Art. 50)

== History ==
=== Colonial era ===
The Executive Council had its beginnings in 1679, when King Charles II issued a 3,438 word commission, on September 18. The Royal Commission separated the territory of New Hampshire from Massachusetts and directed that a new government be organized in the Province of New Hampshire. A president and a nine-member council (representing the four towns of Portsmouth, Dover, Hampton and Exeter) were appointed by the king from the 4,000 settlers of the seacoast area and were required to assume office by January 21, 1680.

Appointees to the council and president were all Puritans, some with long associations with the Boston government and several had served in the Puritan legislature in Boston. Some of the designated council members were so firmly opposed to the new government that they considered refusing their appointed positions. When an ultimatum was presented that less desirable men would replace them, they all relented and took the oath of office on January 21, 1680.

John Cutt, a wealthy Portsmouth merchant, was appointed the first president (later called governor) of New Hampshire. The first official act of the president and council was to create a legislative body, then called an Assembly, to raise taxes and establish public conduct laws. The president and council obtained listings of property owners in the four towns and posted those freeholders (voters) in each town, to elect representatives to the assembly, which was convened on March 16, 1680.

The first assembly, of which the council was the upper branch, was quick to express its opposition to the directives of the royal command. They promptly enacted a law that New Hampshire's property owners' titles, as granted by the Massachusetts Bay Colony over the years, would continue as valid, contrary to the ruling of the King. The legislators also joined with the president and his council in voting an apology to the Bay State for having been torn from their jurisdiction. They also expressed special appreciation for the favors they received through the 38-year affiliation.

At that time, the council's primary responsibility was to report on the activities of the president to the King, especially if he strayed from the crown's dictates.

=== Post-colonial Council ===
On January 5, 1776, the founding fathers of the state created New Hampshire's first constitution, which eliminated the position of governor, but kept the concept of a council due to its former status as a check on the power of authoritarian rule, a recurring theme during the Revolution and afterwards with the creation of the Articles of Confederation, an ethos that made the founding fathers change selection of councilors from appointed to elected positions

In the second and current Constitution, first written in 1784, a head executive was renewed, but given the title "President" rather than Governor to avoid the connotations of the royal governorship during the colonial period. (The title was changed to "Governor" by 1792.) However, the council, while being unable to act on its own, was now given the right to veto the head of state by a 3–2 vote.

The only time the council was in danger of being eliminated was in 1850, when the future U.S. President Franklin Pierce suggested its removal during that year's Constitutional Convention, with the voters of New Hampshire disagreeing with him by a more than two to one margin (27,910 to 11,299).

In 1933, Executive Council meetings were opened to the public.

In 2006, Democrats gained two council seats, giving them a 3–2 edge. This was part of a massive Democratic landslide in which the party won control of both chambers of the New Hampshire General Court, the re-election of John Lynch as governor, and both of the state's seats in the federal U.S. House of Representatives.

In 2010, Republicans claimed all five council seats as part of a national electoral wave that locally saw Republicans taking control of both the New Hampshire Senate and the New Hampshire House of Representatives. In the 2012 elections, Democrats won three seats on the council. During the 2014 elections, Republicans regained the District 5 seat and held three out of five seats on the council. This three of five majority for Republicans continued after the 2016 election. District 3 councilor Chris Sununu was elected governor of New Hampshire in 2016.

== See also ==
- Massachusetts Governor's Council
