= Senator Andrews =

Senator Andrews may refer to:

== Members of the Northern Irish Senate ==
- Jack Andrews (1903–1986), Northern Irish Senator from 1964 to 1972

== Members of the United States Senate ==
- Annie Andrews (born 1980), U.S. Senator-elect from South Carolina
- Charles O. Andrews (1877–1946), U.S. Senator from Florida from 1936 to 1946
- Mark Andrews (politician) (born 1926), U.S. Senator from North Dakota from 1981 to 1987

== United States state senate members ==
- Abraham D. Andrews (1830–1885), Wisconsin State Senate
- Carl Andrews (politician) (fl. 1980s–2000s), New York State Senate
- Charles B. Andrews (1834–1902), Connecticut State Senate
- Christopher Columbus Andrews (1829–1922), Minnesota State Senate
- George H. Andrews (1821–1885), New York State Senate
- Hunter Andrews (1921–2005), Virginia State Senate
- Ike Franklin Andrews (1925–2010), North Carolina State Senate
- John Andrews (Colorado politician) (born 1944), Colorado State Senate
- Lloyd J. Andrews (1920–2014), Washington State Senate
- Mary Andrews (politician) (fl. 1990s–2010s), Maine State Senate
- Thomas Andrews (American politician) (born 1953), Maine State Senate
- W. Thomas Andrews (1941–2009), Pennsylvania State Senate
- William Henry Andrews (1846–1919), Pennsylvania State Senate
- William L. Andrews (1865–1936), Virginia State Senate
- William Noble Andrews (1876–1937), Maryland State Senate

== See also ==
- Senator Andrew (disambiguation)
