= Senate Environmental Justice Caucus =

The Senate Environmental Justice Caucus (EJC) is a caucus within the United States Senate. The EJC works to advance the causes of low-income communities and communities of color who are disproportionately impacted by environmental degradation.

The EJC was established on Earth Day in 2019 by Senators Tammy Duckworth, Cory Booker, and Tom Carper. The creation of the caucus was supported by the Sierra Club and the League of Conservation Voters, among others.
