= 1976 United States House of Representatives election in Delaware =

- November 2, 1976
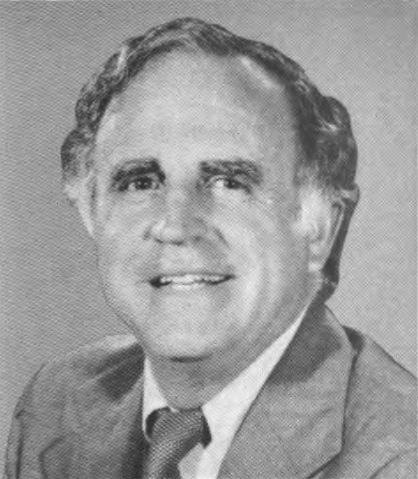

Nominee	Thomas B. Evans Jr.	Samuel L. Shipley
Party	Republican	Democratic
Popular vote	110,636	102,411
Percentage	51.4%	47.6%
- County results Evans: 50–60% Shipley: 50–60%
U.S. Representative before election
Pete du Pont
Republican
Elected U.S. Representative
Thomas B. Evans Jr.
Republican

The 1976 United States House of Representatives election in Delaware took place on November 2, 1976. Incumbent Republican Pete du Pont decided to run for governor instead of running for a fourth term.

Republican candidate Thomas B. Evans won the open seat with 51.44%.

== Results ==
General election results
Party	Candidate	Votes	%
Republican	Thomas B. Evans Jr.	110,636	51.44%
Democratic	Samuel L. Shipley	102,411	47.61%
American Independent	Robert G. LoPresti	840	0.39%
Prohibition	Raymond R. Green	693	0.32%
Socialist Labor	Joseph B. Hollon Sr.	347	0.16%
U.S. Labor	Philip Valenti	150	0.07%
Total votes		215,085	100.00%
Republican hold			
