= Mark Lawrence (politician) =

American attorney and Democratic politician from Maine

Mark W. Lawrence

Member of the Maine Senate from the 35th district
- Incumbent
- Assumed office December 5, 2018
- Preceded by: Dawn Hill
- In office December 2, 1992 – December 6, 2000
- Preceded by: Stephen C. Estes
- Succeeded by: Kenneth F. Lemont

Member of the Maine House of Representatives from the 2nd district
- In office December 7, 2016 – December 5, 2018
- Preceded by: Roberta Beavers
- Succeeded by: Michelle Meyer

Member of the Maine House of Representatives from the 1st district
- In office December 7, 1988 – December 2, 1992
- Preceded by: Frederick F. Soucy
- Succeeded by: Kenneth F. Lemont

Personal details
- Born: 1958 (age 67–68) Kittery, Maine, U.S.
- Party: Democratic
- Spouse: Tina
- Children: 2
- Education: Bowdoin College (BA); University of Maine (JD)
- Profession: Lawyer
- Website: lawrence.mainecandidate.com

Mark W. Lawrence (born 1958) is an American lawyer and Democratic politician currently serving in the Maine Senate. Lawrence represents Senate District 35, comprising the towns of Eliot, Kittery, Ogunquit, South Berwick, York and part of Berwick. Lawrence was born in Kittery and attended Bowdoin College and the University of Maine School of Law where he was elected to his first term in the Maine House of Representatives. He has served a total of three terms in the Maine House and is serving his sixth nonconsecutive term in the Maine Senate, where he served as president from 1996 to 2000.

Lawrence was the 2000 Democratic United States Senate nominee, challenging incumbent Olympia Snowe, and in 2008 he unsuccessfully sought the Democratic nomination for Maine's 1st congressional district. Lawrence pursued private law practice for 14 years before becoming the York County District Attorney from 2003 to 2010. In 2010, he returned to private practice and operates the Lawrence Law Firm out of Kittery.

== Early life and education ==
Lawrence grew up in Kittery, Maine. His father, Irving Lawrence, worked at the Portsmouth Naval Shipyard and his mother was a typesetter. He attended Kittery Public Schools and received a Bachelor of Arts from Bowdoin College and a Juris Doctor from the University of Maine School of Law.

== Career ==
=== Maine legislature ===
During his second year of law school, Lawrence was elected to the Maine House of Representatives. He served two terms in the House from 1988 until 1992 and four terms in the Maine Senate from 1992 until 2000. Lawrence was elected president of the 118th Maine Senate in December 1996 and president of the 119th Maine Senate in December 1998. In November 2016, he was again elected to the Maine House, and in 2018 he returned to the Maine Senate and was re-elected in 2020.

=== Congressional runs ===
Lawrence was the 2000 Democratic challenger to incumbent Olympia Snowe in the 2000 U.S. Senate election, but lost to Snowe 69%-31%. In 2008, he ran for the Democratic nomination for Maine's 1st congressional district but was defeated in the primary.

=== Law practice ===
Lawrence spent 14 years in private law practice before being appointed by Maine Governor John Baldacci to replace York County District Attorney Michael Cantara, who had been tapped to serve as the state's public safety commissioner. Lawrence was elected to the position in 2004 and 2006, but withdrew from the 2010 race in July of that year. He returned to private practice and currently operates The Lawrence Law Firm in South Berwick.

== Personal life ==
Lawrence lives in Eliot, Maine with his wife Tina and two daughters, Céline and Hayley.

== Electoral history ==
=== Maine House of Representatives ===
1988

1990

2016 Maine House District 2 Democratic Primary
Party	Candidate	Votes	%
Democratic	Mark W. Lawrence	342	53.9%
Democratic	Kimberly Richards	239	37.6%
Democratic	Gary Sinden	54	8.5%
Total votes		635	100%

2016 Maine House District 2 General Election
Party	Candidate	Votes	%
Democratic	Mark W. Lawrence	3,116	54.9%
Republican	Jonathan Moynahan	2,561	45.1%
Total votes		5,677	100.0%

=== Maine State Senate ===
1992

1994

1996

1998

2018 Maine Senate District 35 Democratic Primary
Party	Candidate	Votes	%
Democratic	Mark W. Lawrence	4,104	100%
Total votes		4,104	100.0%

2018 Maine Senate District 35 General Election
Party	Candidate	Votes	%
Democratic	Mark W. Lawrence	13,408	62.5%
Republican	Michael Estes	8,050	37.5%
Total votes		21,458	100%

2020 Maine Senate District 35 Democratic Primary
Party	Candidate	Votes	%
Democratic	Mark W. Lawrence	6,031	100%
Total votes		6,031	100%

2020 Maine House District 35 General Election
Party	Candidate	Votes	%
Democratic	Mark W. Lawrence	17,099	62.6%
Republican	Bradley Moulton	10,204	37.4%
Total votes		27,303	100%

=== United States Senate, 2000 ===
2000 United States Senate Democratic Primary
Party	Candidate	Votes	%
Democratic	Mark W. Lawrence	26,543	100.0%
Total votes		26,543	100.0%

2000 United States Senate General Election
Party	Candidate	Votes	%
Republican	Olympia Snowe	437,689	68.9%
Democratic	Mark W. Lawrence	197,183	31.1%
Total votes		634,872	100.0%

=== 1st Congressional district, 2008 ===
2008 Maine 1st Congressional District Democratic Primary
Party	Candidate	Votes	%
Democratic	Chellie Pingree	24,324	43.9%
Democratic	Adam Roland Cote	15,706	28.4%
Democratic	Michael F. Brennan	6,040	10.9%
Democratic	Ethan King Strimling	5,833	10.5%
Democratic	Mark W. Lawrence	2,726	4.9%
Democratic	Stephen J. Meister	753	1.4%
Total votes		55,382	100%

Party political offices
Preceded by Thomas Andrews	Democratic nominee for U.S. Senator from Maine (Class 1); 2000	Succeeded by Jean Hay Bright
