= DWAC =

DWAC may refer to:

- DWAC-FM, a radio station in Naga, Philippines
- DWAC-TV, a television station in Manila, Philippines
- Digital World Acquisition Corp., a special-purpose acquisition company that eventually merged with Trump Media & Technology Group
- Devil Without a Cause, a 1998 album by Kid Rock or its title track
