= Peter Snowe =

American politician (1943–1973)

Member of the Maine House of Representatives from Auburn
- In office January 1967 – April 10, 1973
- Succeeded by: Olympia Snowe

Personal details
- Born: Peter Trafton Snowe; January 16, 1943 Lewiston, Maine, U.S.
- Died: April 10, 1973 (aged 30) West Gardiner, Maine, U.S.
- Party: Republican
- Spouse: Olympia Jean Bouchles (m. 1967)
- Education: University of Maine (BA)

Peter Trafton Snowe (January 16, 1943 – April 10, 1973) was an American politician who served in the Maine House of Representatives from 1967 until his death in a car accident in 1973 at age 30. He was the husband of Olympia Snowe, who went on to be elected to his seat in the state legislature after his death and was later elected to the U.S. House of Representatives from 1979 to 1995 and served three terms in the U.S. Senate from 1995 to 2013.

== Early life and education ==
Snowe was born in Lewiston, Maine, on January 16, 1943. In 1962, he graduated from Edward Little High School in Auburn, Maine. He attended Bentley College of Accounting and the University of Maine.

== Career ==
He served in the Maine National Guard and Maine Air National Guard. He was president and treasurer of the Superior Concrete Company, Inc. in Auburn, Maine. On December 29, 1969, Snowe married Olympia Bouchles in New York City. Snowe served in the Maine House of Representatives, from Auburn, Maine, from 1967 until his death in 1973 and was a Republican.

== Death ==
On April 10, 1973, Snowe was killed in an automobile crash on the Maine Turnpike in West Gardiner, Maine.
