= NORPAC =

Pro-Israel political action committee

- Formation: 1994; 32 years ago
- Legal status: Political action committee
- Purpose: Israel lobby in the United States
- Headquarters: Englewood Cliffs, New Jersey
- Website: norpac.net

NORPAC is a pro-Israel political action committee in the United States. NORPAC supports candidates for Congress who hold pro-Israel positions. In the 2018 election cycle, it spent $1.1 million supporting its preferred candidates, which include both Democrats and Republicans.

== See also ==
- American Israel Public Affairs Committee
- Political action committee
