= Peter Bowman =

American politician (born 1937)

Peter Bruce Bowman

Member of the Maine Senate from the 1st district
- In office 2006–2010
- Preceded by: Mary Andrews
- Succeeded by: Dawn Hill

Personal details
- Born: October 5, 1937 (age 89) New Rochelle, New York, U.S.
- Party: Democratic

Military service
- Allegiance: United States
- Branch/service: United States Navy
- Years of service: 1960–1990
- Rank: Captain
- Awards: Legion of Merit; Meritorious Service Medal

Peter B. Bowman (born October 5, 1937) is an American politician from Maine. Bowman served as a Democratic State Senator from Maine's 1st District, representing part of York County, including his residence in Kittery. He was first elected to the Maine Senate in 2006 after incumbent Republican Mary Andrews did not seek re-election. He has also served on the Kittery School Committee.

Bowman attended New Rochelle High School from 1951 to 1954 before transferring to Tredyffrin-Easttown High School in Berwyn, Pennsylvania, graduating in 1955. He then enrolled at Cornell University, graduating in 1960 with a bachelor's degree in Electrical Engineering. Bowman later earned a dual M.S. (Ocean Engineering) and M.B.A. from the Massachusetts Institute of Technology and MIT Sloan School of Management in 1973.

Commissioned through the NROTC program in 1960, he spent 30 years serving in the Navy and was commander of the Portsmouth Naval Shipyard from 1987 to 1990, which he cited as making him a more effective legislator. Bowman served aboard USS Picking (DD-685), USS George C. Marshall (SSBN-654) and USS Patrick Henry (SSBN-599). He was designated an engineering duty officer after graduation from M.I.T. and became a specialist in nuclear submarine maintenance. Bowman was promoted to captain effective October 1, 1981. He served as Director of Electrical Systems for Naval Sea Systems Command in Washington, D.C. from 1981 to 1984 and as Planning Manager for the Mare Island Naval Shipyard in Vallejo, California from 1984 to 1987. After retirement from active duty, Bowman was nominated to be a Defense Base Closure and Realignment Commissioner by President George H. W. Bush in 1993.

In 2010, Bowman was replaced in the state senate by fellow Democrat Dawn Hill.
