= Dawn Hill =

American attorney and Democratic politician from Maine

Member of the Maine Senate
- In office December 2014 – December 2018
- Preceded by: Troy Jackson
- Succeeded by: Mark W. Lawrence
- Constituency: 35th District
- In office December 2010 – December 2014
- Preceded by: Peter Bowman
- Succeeded by: Peter Edgecomb
- Constituency: 1st District

Member of the Maine House of Representatives
- In office December 2006 – December 2010
- Preceded by: Bradley Moulton
- Succeeded by: Bradley Moulton
- Constituency: 149th District

Dawn Hill is an American politician from Maine. A Cape Neddick, York resident, Hill represents the 1st Senate District. Prior to being elected a Maine State Senator, she represented part of York County in District 149 from 2006 to 2010.

== Education and career ==
Hill graduated from West Virginia University College of Law in 1979. After graduating, she moved to the Cape Neddick neighborhood of York. She became licensed as an attorney in both West Virginia and Maine. She runs a dog training and activity facility in York and serves on the Board of Directors of the York Land Trust.

In June 2009, Hill announced her intention to seek the Democratic Party's nomination for the 2010 gubernatorial election. However, she withdrew from the race in January 2010, citing difficulties in fundraising due to the large number of candidates participating in the primary.
