= 1996 Delaware gubernatorial election =

- November 5, 1996
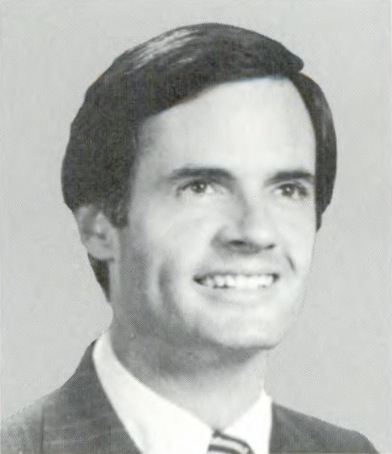

Nominee	Tom Carper	Janet Rzewnicki
Party	Democratic	Republican
Running mate	Ruth Ann Minner	Sherman N. Miller
Popular vote	188,300	82,564
Percentage	69.50%	30.50%
- Carper: 50–60% 60–70% 70–80% 80–90% >90%
Governor before election
Tom Carper
Democratic
Elected Governor
Tom Carper
Democratic

The 1996 Delaware gubernatorial election was held on November 5, 1996, to elect the governor of the state of Delaware. Incumbent governor Thomas Carper, the Democratic nominee, was re-elected to his second and final term in a landslide over Republican nominee and Delaware State Treasurer Janet Rzewnicki. Both were unopposed in their respective primaries. Tom Carper became the first Democratic governor in state history to win 2 consecutive terms.

== General election ==
=== Results ===
Delaware gubernatorial election, 1996
Party	Candidate	Votes	%	±%
Democratic	Tom Carper (incumbent)	188,300	69.50%	+4.75%
Republican	Janet Rzewnicki	82,654	30.50%	−2.24%
Majority		105,646	38.99%	+6.99%
Turnout		270,954		
Democratic hold		Swing		

==== By county ====
County	Tom Carper Democratic		Janet Rzewnicki Republican	
County	#	%	#	%
Kent	24,946	63.2%	14,503	36.8%
New Castle	129,512	72.1%	50,081	27.9%
Sussex	33,842	65.2%	18,070	34.8%
Totals	188,300	69.5%	82,654	30.5%
