= Janet Rzewnicki =

American politician and Delaware State Treasurer (born 1953)

Treasurer of Delaware
- In office January 3, 1983 – January 20, 1999
- Governor: Pete du Pont; Mike Castle; Dale E. Wolf; Tom Carper
- Preceded by: Tom Carper
- Succeeded by: Jack Markell

Personal details
- Born: May 21, 1953 (age 71); Akron, Ohio, U.S.
- Political party: Republican
- Education: University of Delaware (BA)

Janet C. Rzewnicki (born May 21, 1953) is an American retired politician and businesswoman who served four consecutive four-year terms as Delaware State Treasurer, serving from 1983 to 1999. A member of the Republican Party, she also ran unsuccessfully for Delaware's at-large congressional seat and for the governorship during the 1990s.

== Life and career ==
Rzewnicki (pronounced Rez-nicky) was born in Akron, Ohio, to Robert E. and Betty Ann Myers. She graduated from the University of Delaware in 1978, receiving the College of Business and Economics' Alumni Award of Excellence in 1992.

She worked as a certified public accountant and became politically active, initially as a Democrat who worked on Tom Carper's campaigns. In 1982, she switched parties and narrowly defeated New Castle County councilman Joseph Farley to become Delaware State Treasurer. She went on to serve four consecutive four-year terms as state treasurer, from 1983 to 1999.

Rzewnicki unsuccessfully challenged former governor Mike Castle in the Republican primary for Delaware's at-large seat in the United States House of Representatives in 1992, losing 54%-43%. She won the Republican nomination for governor in 1996 but lost the general election in a forty-point landslide to popular Democratic incumbent Governor Tom Carper. She was the first woman nominated for governor by a major party in Delaware. She went on to lose her 1998 reelection campaign for state treasurer to Democratic challenger and telecommunications executive Jack Markell.

After leaving office in 1999, she joined DuPont Direct Financial Holdings in 2001. She served as president of the National Association of State Treasurers in 1988–89.

== Personal life ==
Rzewnicki's husband, Victor, worked as a computer systems analyst for DuPont as of 1982.

Political offices
Preceded by Tom Carper	Treasurer of Delaware; 1983–1999	Succeeded by Jack Markell
Party political offices
Preceded by Lynn Jankus	Republican nominee for Delaware State Treasurer; 1982, 1986, 1990, 1994, 1998	Succeeded by Ronald G. "Ron" Poliquin
Preceded by Gary Scott	Republican nominee for Governor of Delaware; 1996	Succeeded by John M. Burris
