= Olympia Snowe =

American politician (born 1947)

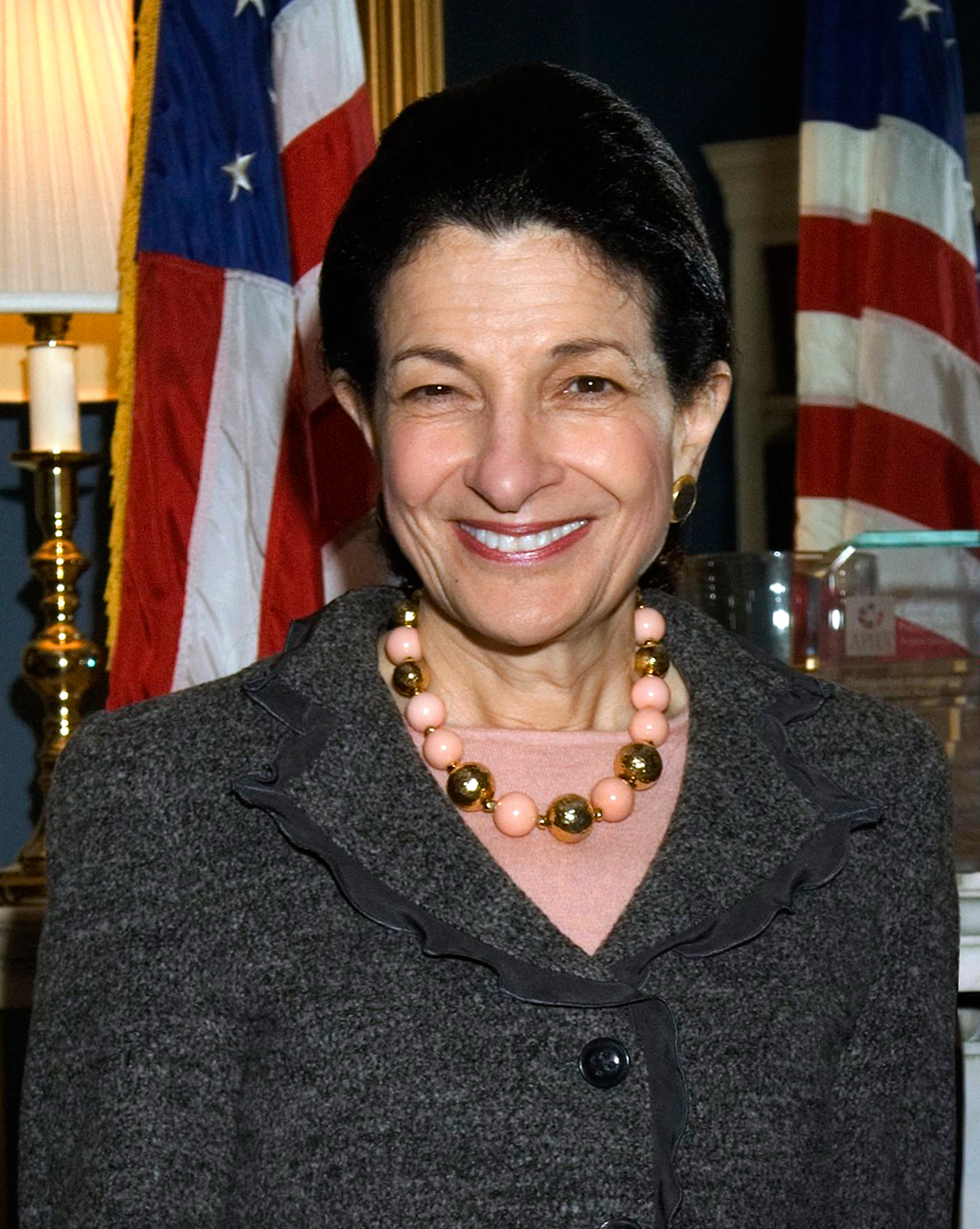
- Snowe in 2009

United States Senator from Maine
- In office January 3, 1995 – January 3, 2013
- Preceded by: George Mitchell
- Succeeded by: Angus King
Senate positions
Chair of the Senate Small Business Committee
In office January 3, 2003 – January 3, 2007
Preceded by	John Kerry
Succeeded by	John Kerry
Ranking Member of the Senate Small Business Committee
In office January 3, 2007 – January 3, 2013
Preceded by	John Kerry
Succeeded by	Jim Risch

First Lady of Maine
- In role February 24, 1989 – January 5, 1995
- Governor: John McKernan
- Preceded by: Constance Brennan
- Succeeded by: Mary Herman

Member of the U.S. House of Representatives from Maine's 2nd district
- In office January 3, 1979 – January 3, 1995
- Preceded by: Bill Cohen
- Succeeded by: John Baldacci

Member of the Maine Senate from the 12th district
- In office January 5, 1977 – January 3, 1979
- Preceded by: Elmer Berry
- Succeeded by: Barbara Trafton

Member of the Maine House of Representatives
- In office May 23, 1973 – January 5, 1977
- Preceded by: Peter Snowe
- Succeeded by: Barbara Trafton
- Constituency: Auburn (1973–1975); 4th district (1975–1977)

Personal details
- Born: Olympia Jean Bouchles; February 21, 1947 (age 79) Augusta, Maine, U.S.
- Party: Republican
- Spouses: Peter Snowe (m. 1969; died 1973); John McKernan (m. 1989)
- Education: University of Maine (BA)
- Website: Official website
- Snowe's voice Snowe opposing the closure of Naval Air Station Brunswick at a 2005 BRAC hearing. Recorded August 10, 2005

Olympia Jean Snowe (née Bouchles; born February 21, 1947) is an American businesswoman and politician who was a United States senator, representing Maine for three terms from 1995 to 2013. A lifelong member of the Republican Party, Snowe played an influential role in influencing the outcome of close votes in the U.S. Senate and in ending U.S. Senate filibusters. In 2006, Time magazine named her one of "America's Best Senators". Throughout her U.S. Senate career, she was considered one of the chamber's most moderate members.

On February 28, 2012, Snowe announced that she would not seek re-election in the 2012 U.S. Senate election, and she retired when her third term ended on January 3, 2013. She cited hyperpartisanship, leading to a dysfunctional Congress, as her primary reason for her retirement. In January 2013, she was replaced by former Maine governor Angus King, a former Democrat and current independent who won the 2012 U.S. Senate election in Maine.

In May 2013, Snowe was appointed senior fellow at the Bipartisan Policy Center in Washington, D.C., where she co-chairs its Commission on Political Reform and serves on the center's board of directors.

== Early life and education ==
Snowe was born Olympia Jean Bouchles in Augusta, Maine, on February 21, 1947, the daughter of Georgia (née Goranites) and George John Bouchles. Her father emigrated to the United States from Sparta, Greece, and her maternal grandparents were Greek. She is a member of the Greek Orthodox Church.

When she was eight years old, her mother died of breast cancer. Less than a year later, her father died of cardiovascular disease. Left orphaned, she was moved to Auburn, where she was raised by her aunt, a textile mill worker, and uncle, a barber, along with their five children. Her brother John was raised separately by other family members. A few years later, disease also claimed her uncle's life. Snowe attended Saint Basil Academy in Garrison, New York, for third through ninth grades, and then returned to Auburn, where she attended and graduated from Edward Little High School.

She then attended the University of Maine in Orono, where she graduated with a Bachelor of Arts degree in political science in 1969. On December 29, 1969, shortly after graduating, she married Peter Snowe, a Republican Maine Representative, in New York City.

== Career ==
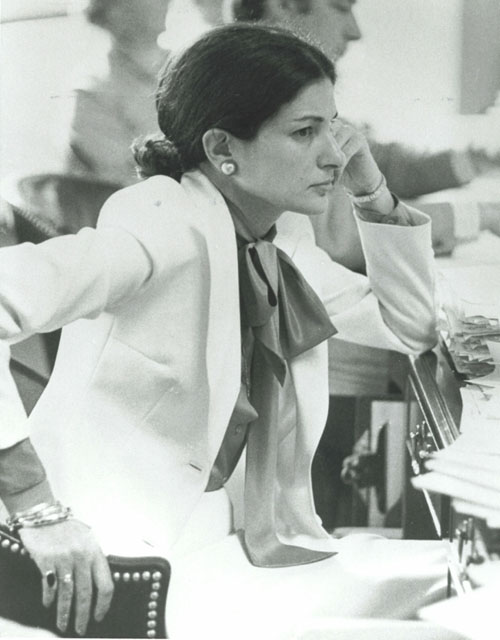
Snowe as a Maine Senator in 1977

Snowe entered politics and rose quickly, winning a seat on the Board of Voter Registration and then worked for U.S. representative and later U.S. senator and U.S. secretary of defense William Cohen.

In 1973, tragedy again struck Snowe when her husband was killed in an automobile accident. At the urging of her family, friends, neighbors, and local leaders, Snowe ran for her husband's Auburn-based seat in the Maine House of Representatives, and, at the age of 26, won it. In 1974, she was re-elected. In 1976, she won election to the Maine Senate, where she represented Androscoggin County. The same year, she was a delegate to both Maine's Republican convention and to the Republican National Convention in Kansas City, Missouri, which nominated Gerald Ford as its nominee in the 1976 presidential election.

=== U.S. House of Representatives ===
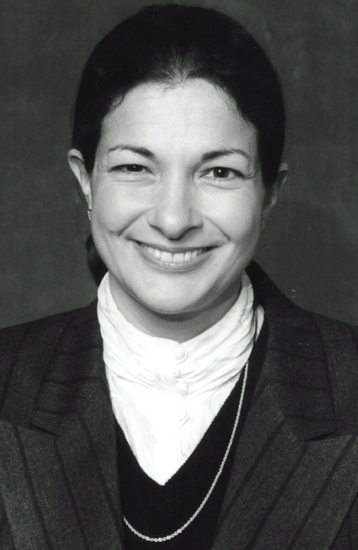
Snowe's official photo as a U.S. Representative in 1982

In 1978, Snowe ran for the U.S. House of Representatives and won. From 1979 to 1995, she represented Maine's 2nd congressional district, which included most of the northern two-thirds of Maine, including Bangor and her hometown of Auburn. As a U.S. Representative, Snowe served on the House Budget and House Foreign Affairs committees.

As a U.S. Representative in August 1983, Snowe voted for the bill establishing Martin Luther King Jr. Day as a federal holiday. In March 1988, she voted in support of the Civil Rights Restoration Act of 1987 and in support of overriding President Reagan's veto of it.

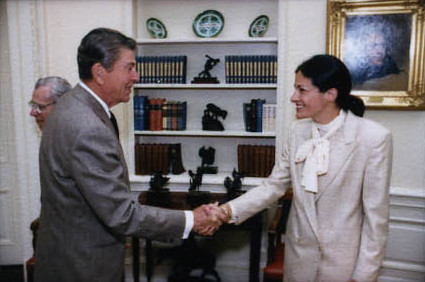
Snowe and President Ronald Reagan in the Oval Office in September 1986

In February 1989, Snowe married John R. McKernan Jr., then Governor of Maine. Snowe and McKernan served together as U.S. representatives from Maine between 1983 and 1986. McKernan represented Maine's 1st congressional district. After marrying McKernan, Snowe served simultaneously as First Lady of Maine from 1989 to 1995 and a member of Congress. In 1991, tragedy again struck Snowe when her stepson Peter McKernan died from a heart ailment at the age of 20.

=== U.S. Senate ===
==== Elections ====
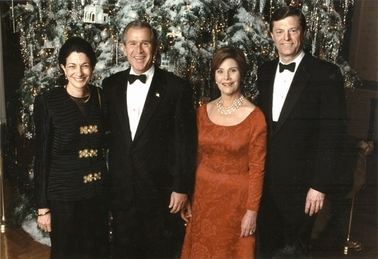
Snowe and her husband, former Maine governor John R. McKernan Jr., with President George W. Bush and Laura Bush at a White House holiday reception in December 2002

In 1994, after then U.S. Senate majority leader George J. Mitchell chose not to seek re-election to the U.S. Senate, Snowe immediately declared her candidacy for the seat. In the general election, Snowe faced Democratic nominee Tom Andrews, a U.S. Representative then representing Maine's 1st congressional district. Snowe won election to the U.S. Senate, defeating Andrews 60–36% and carrying every county in the state as part of a national Republican election sweep in which Republicans captured both the U.S. House and U.S. Senate for the first time since 1954.

In the 2000 U.S. Senate election, Snowe was easily re-elected, defeating Mark Lawrence, then Maine Senate president, 69%–31%. Six years later, in the 2006 U.S. Senate election, Snowe was again re-elected overwhelming, cruising past Democratic opponent Jean Hay Bright, and winning with an electoral margin of 74% to 20.6%. In each of her three U.S. Senate races in Maine, Snowe won every county in the state.

==== Tenure ====
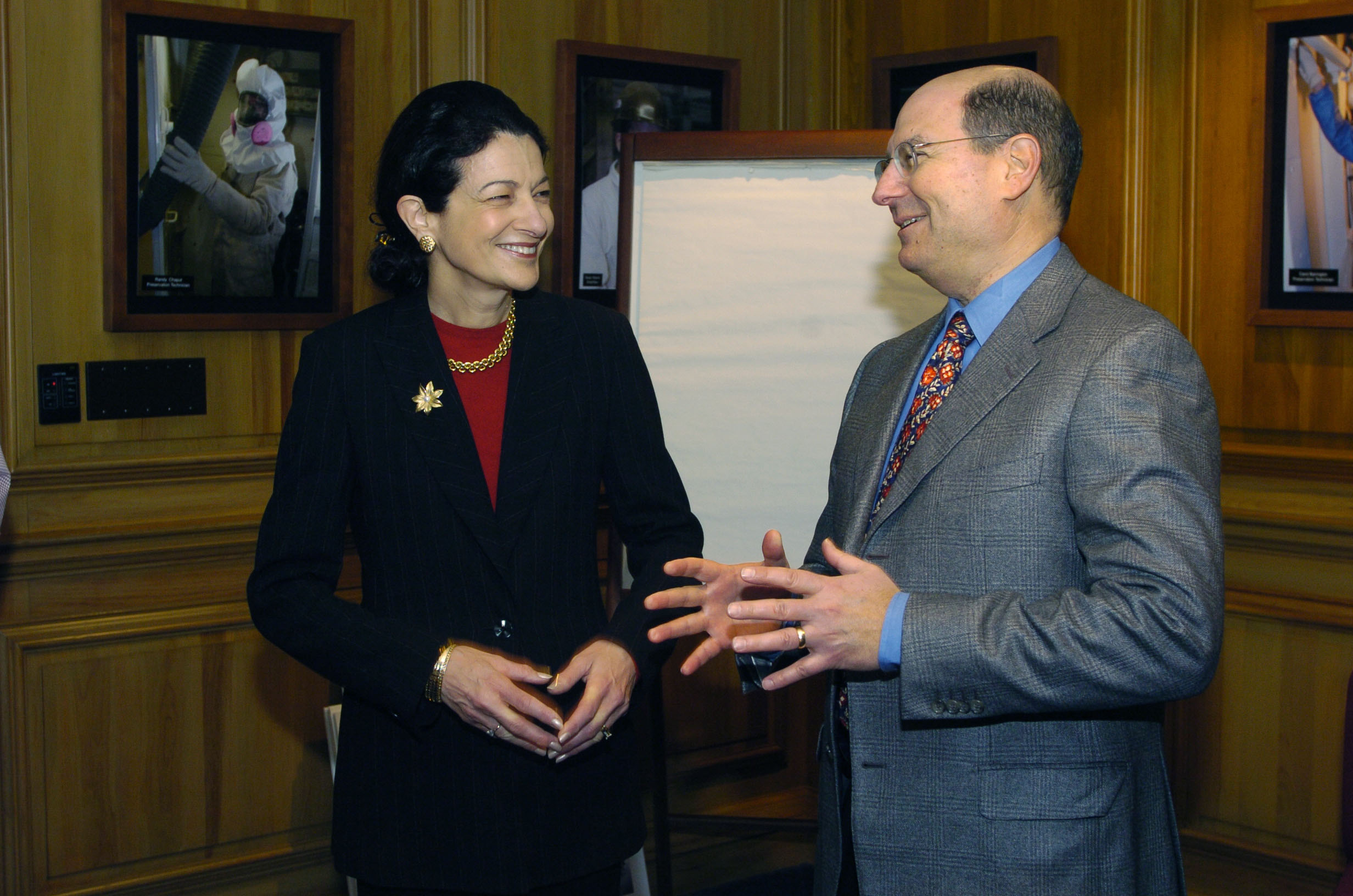
Snowe and the U.S. secretary of the Navy Donald C. Winter meeting at Supervisor Shipbuilding at Bath Iron Works in Bath, Maine, in January 2006

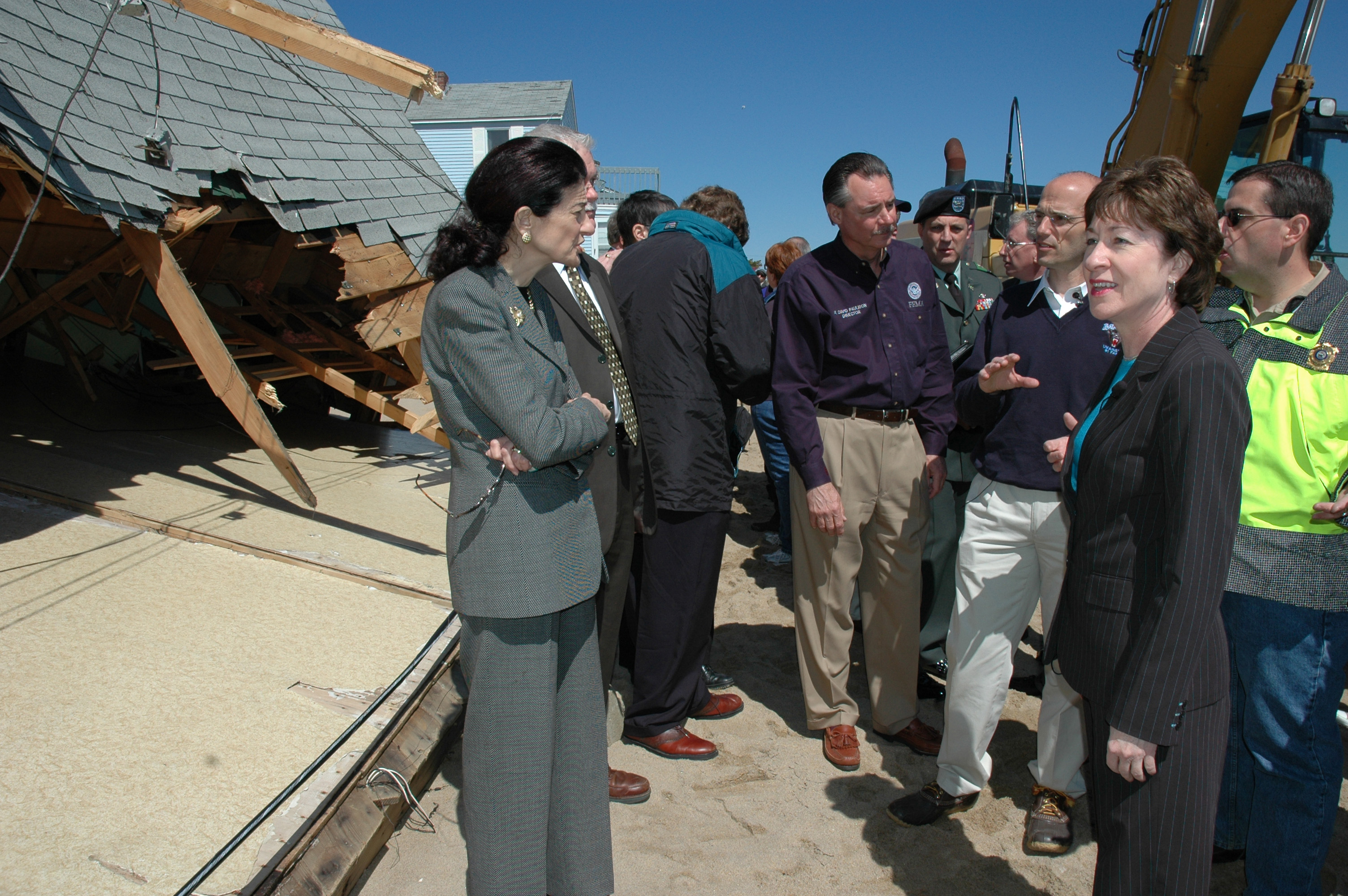
Snowe and fellow U.S. senator from Maine Susan Collins touring damaged areas of Maine in June 2007

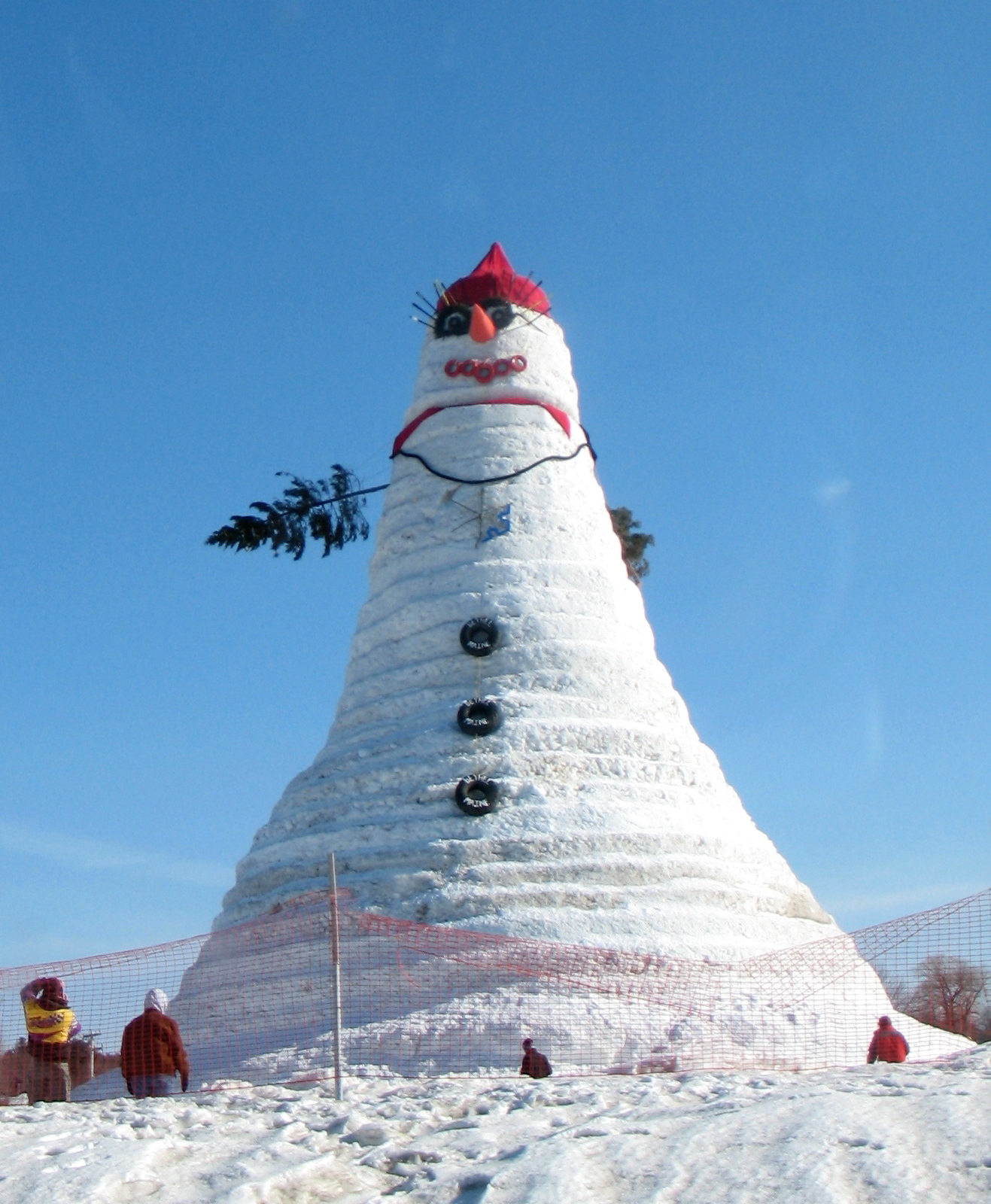
In March 2008, while Snowe was a U.S. senator, the record for the world's largest snowman or snowwoman was set in Bethel, Maine, with a snowwoman standing 122 feet 1 inch (37.21 m) in height and named Olympia in honor of Snowe.

In February 1999, as a U.S. senator, Snowe was an important voice during the U.S. Senate's impeachment trial of then-president Bill Clinton. She and fellow Maine senator Susan Collins sponsored a finding of fact motion that would have allowed the Senate to vote separately on the charges facing Clinton and remedy for those charges. When the motion failed, Snowe and Collins voted to acquit Clinton, arguing that his perjury did not warrant his removal from office. Her occasional breaks with the Bush administration drew attacks from conservative Republicans, the Club for Growth, and Concerned Women for America, leading to her being labelled a Republican In Name Only, or RINO.

In October 2002, following the September 11 attacks, Snowe voted in favor of the Iraq Resolution, which authorized President George W. Bush to use of U.S. military force against Saddam Hussein in Iraq, which led to the 2003 invasion of Iraq five months later.

In February 2006, TheWhiteHouseProject.org named Snowe one of its "8 in '08", a group of eight female politicians who could possibly be elected president in the 2008 presidential election.

As a U.S. senator, Snowe voted to confirm each of four U.S. Supreme Court nominees who came before the U.S. Senate: John Roberts, Samuel Alito, Sonia Sotomayor, and Elena Kagan.

In April 2006, Snowe was selected by Time as one of "America's 10 Best Senators" and the only female U.S. senator to be selected. Time praised Snowe for her sensitivity to constituents, reporting that, "Because of her centrist views and eagerness to get beyond partisan point scoring, Maine Republican Olympia Snowe is in the center of every policy debate in Washington." She was awarded honorary degrees from Bates College in 1999 and the University of Delaware in 2008.

During the 110th United States Congress between 2007 and 2009, Snowe was present for each of the U.S. Senate's 657 floor votes. She was one of only eight senators who did not miss any votes during that session.

Snowe was the fourth woman to serve on the U.S. Senate Armed Services Committee and the first woman to chair the U.S. Senate Subcommittee on Seapower, which oversees the Navy and Marine Corps. In 2001, Snowe became the first Republican woman to secure a full-term seat on the U.S. Senate Finance Committee.

In 1978, Snowe became the youngest female Republican elected to Congress (at age 31). She eventually became the first woman to serve in both houses of a state legislature and both houses of Congress, being elected to the Senate in 1994 after having served in the Maine state house and senate and the House of Representatives. Over her 35-year career as an elected official, Snowe never lost an election. In the 2006 U.S. Senate elections, she won re-election with 73.99% of the vote.

On February 27, 2012, citing excessive partisanship and a dispiriting political environment, Snowe announced she would not run for re-election in November 2012. Her unexpected decision delivered a potential blow to Republicans, who needed just a handful of seats to regain control of the U.S. Senate. Snowe was considered one of the safest Republican incumbents in the 2012 U.S. Senate elections.

=== Gang of 14 ===
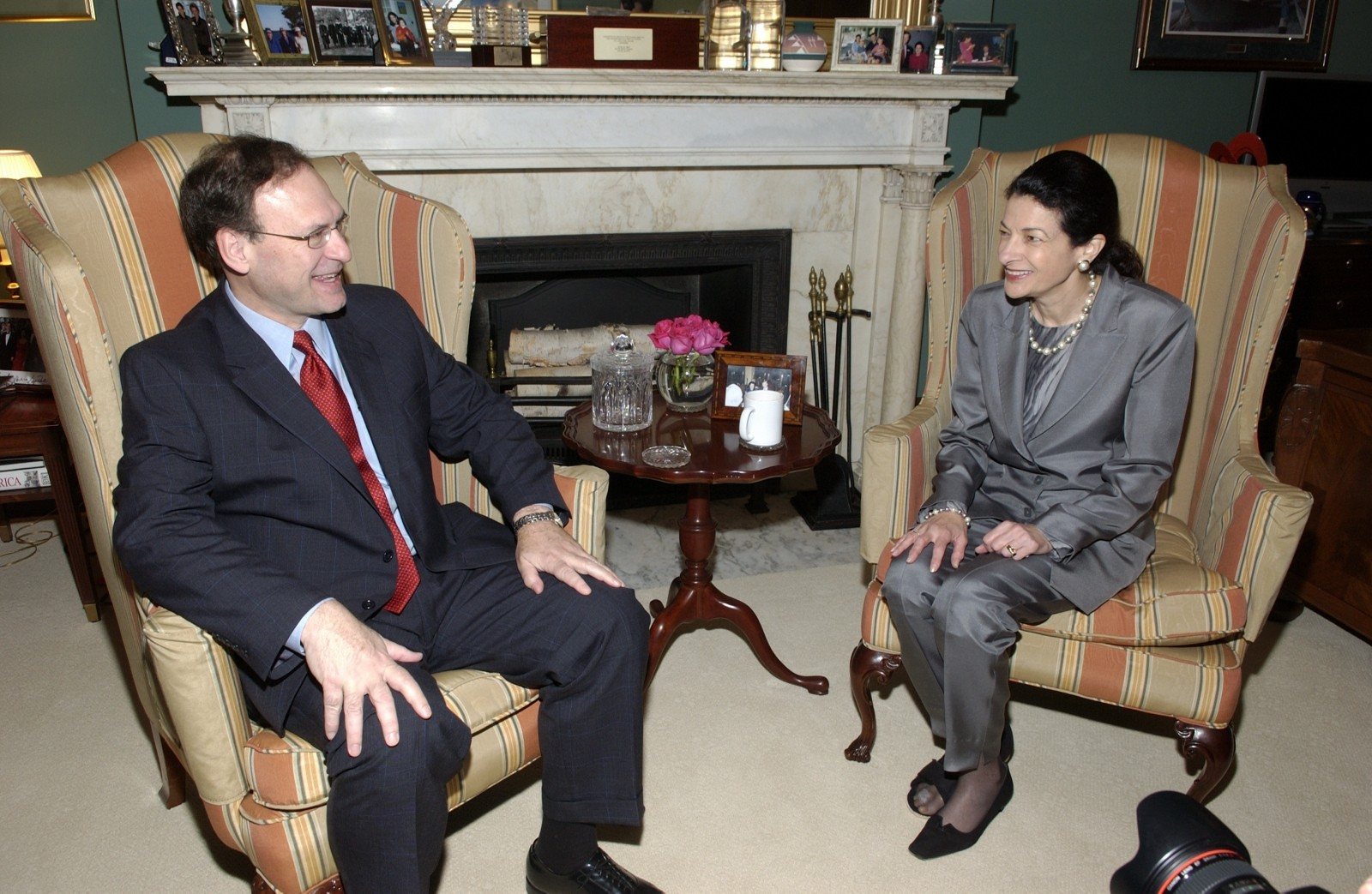
Snowe meeting with U.S. Supreme Court associate justice nominee Samuel Alito in June 2005

On May 23, 2005, Snowe was one of fourteen senators, known as the Gang of 14, who defused a confrontation between Senate Democrats who were filibustering several judicial nominees and the Senate Republican leadership who wanted to use the nominations as a flashpoint to eliminate filibusters on nominees through the so-called nuclear option. The Gang of 14 brokered a compromise that precluded further filibusters or the implementation of the nuclear option for the remainder of the 109th Congress. Under its terms, Democrats retained the power to filibuster Bush judicial nominees in an "extraordinary circumstance". In exchange, Bush nominees Janice Rogers Brown, Priscilla Owen, and William Pryor were confirmed with simple majority vote by the full Senate. The Gang of 14 later played an important role in the confirmation of Chief Justice John Roberts and Associate Justice Samuel Alito, neither of which they asserted met the "extraordinary circumstances" provision outlined in their agreement. Snowe voted to confirm both Roberts and Alito.

=== Committee assignments ===
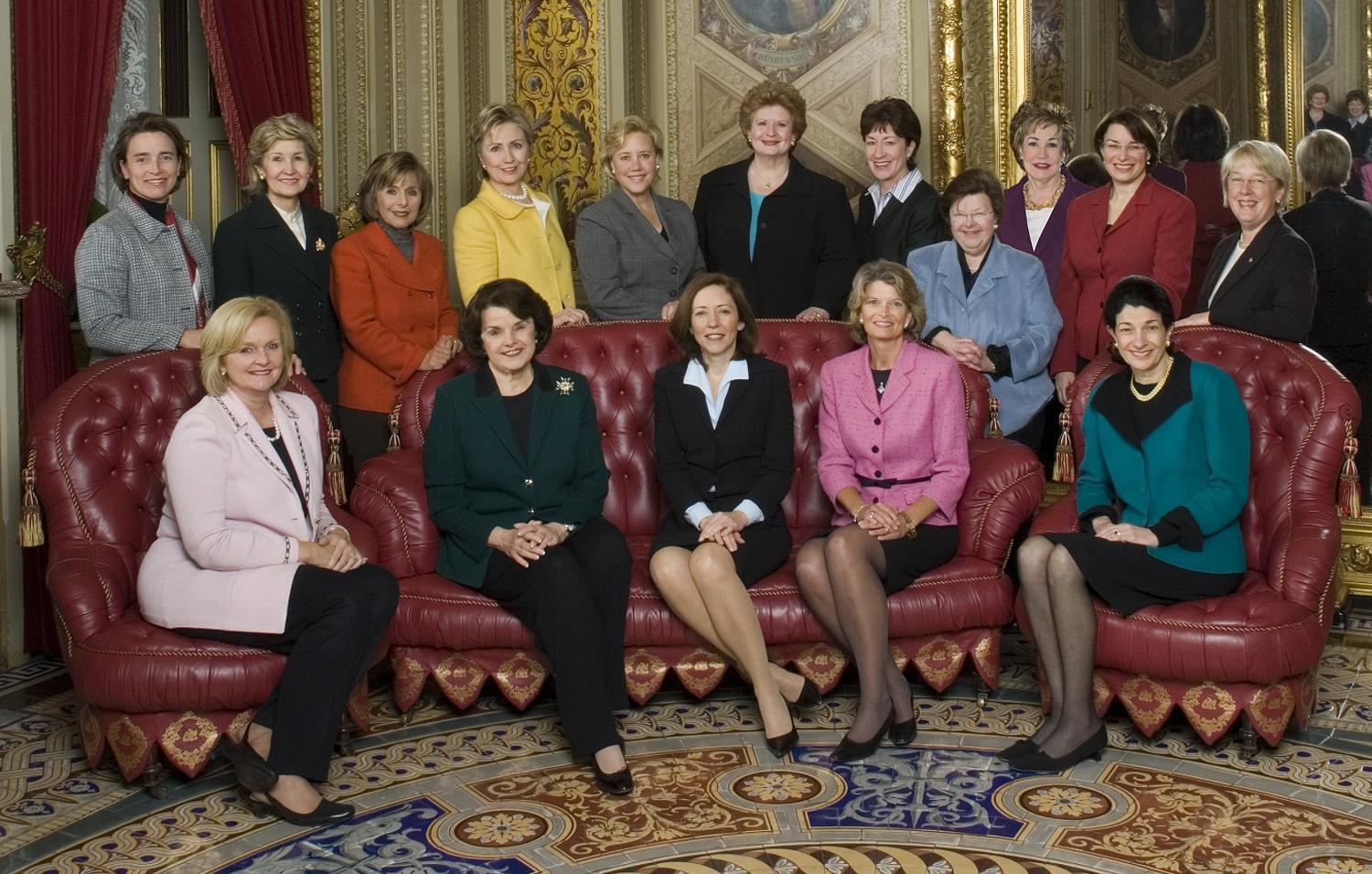
Snowe (first row on lower right), one of 16 female U.S. Senators in the 110th U.S. Congress, in January 2007

- Committee on Commerce, Science, and Transportation
  - Subcommittee on Aviation Operations, Safety, and Security
  - Subcommittee on Communications, Technology, and the Internet
  - Subcommittee on Consumer Protection, Product Safety, and Insurance
  - Subcommittee on Oceans, Atmosphere, Fisheries, and Coast Guard (Ranking Member)
  - Subcommittee on Science and Space
  - Subcommittee on Surface Transportation and Merchant Marine Infrastructure, Safety, and Security
- Committee on Finance
  - Subcommittee on Health Care
  - Subcommittee on Taxation, IRS Oversight, and Long-term Growth
  - Subcommittee on International Trade and Global Competitiveness
- Committee on Small Business and Entrepreneurship (Ranking Member)
- Select Committee on Intelligence

=== Caucus memberships ===
- Dairy Farmer Caucus
- Health Technology Caucus (co chair)
- International Conservation Caucus (co chair)
- Senate Tourism Caucus
- Senate Women's Caucus
- Sportsmen's Caucus
- Senate Hunger Caucus
- Senate Oceans Caucus (founding member)

== Ideology and presidential endorsements ==
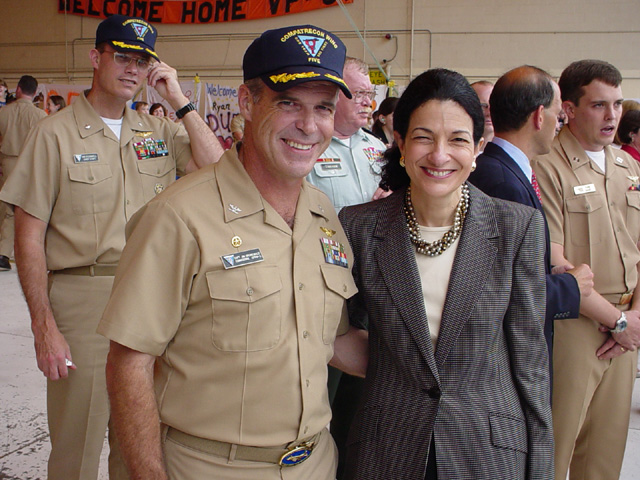
Snowe meeting with U.S. Navy personnel returning from the Iraq War at Naval Air Station Brunswick in Brunswick, Maine, in August 2003

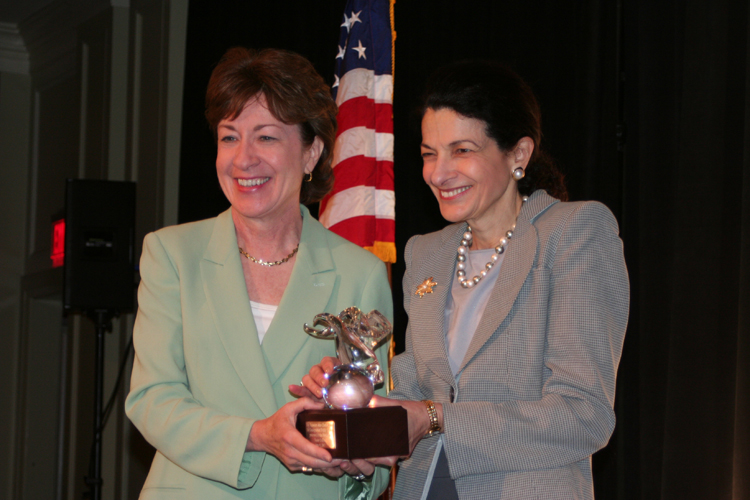
Snowe with fellow U.S. senator from Maine Susan Collins in June 2007

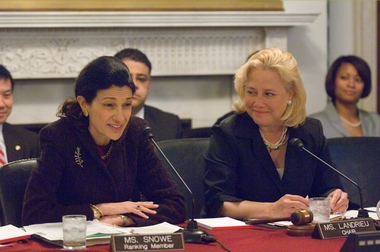
Snowe (left) and U.S. Senate Small Business and Entrepreneurship chair Mary Landrieu (right) in June 2010

=== Ideology ===
Snowe shares a centrist ideology with Susan Collins, her former U.S. Senate colleague from Maine, who will serve in the Senate until January 2027. Collins is considered a "half-turn more conservative" than Snowe, Time magazine reported in February 2009. In 2012, National Journal ranked Snowe a composite 57% conservative score and a 43% liberal score. In 2012-13, according to GovTrack, Snowe was the most liberal Republican U.S. senator, ranked to the left of every Republican and several Democrats. Her highest National Journal composite conservative score was 63% in 2010, and her highest composite liberal score was a 55.5% in 2006.

=== Presidential endorsements ===
In February 2007, Snowe endorsed Republican candidate John McCain in the 2008 presidential election. In December 2011, Snowe endorsed Republican candidate Mitt Romney in the 2012 presidential election.

== Political positions ==
=== Border security and immigration policies ===
In 2007, Snowe was one of several Republicans to vote in favor of legislation that would have granted citizenship to undocumented immigrants, but she voted against the DREAM Act in 2010. She also voted to continue funding to sanctuary cities, voted against eliminating the 'Y' guest worker visa program, voted in favor of building a fence along the southern border, and voted to make English the official language of the United States.

=== Fiscal policy ===
In the 111th Congress, Snowe backed the release of additional Troubled Asset Relief Program (TARP) funds and the American Recovery and Reinvestment Act. She opposed President Barack Obama's budget resolution, but pledged to work in a bipartisan manner on health care reform and energy.

Snowe supported cutting taxes as an economic stimulus. In 2003, however, she joined two Republican senators, Lincoln Chafee and John McCain, in voting against the Jobs and Growth Tax Relief Reconciliation Act. In 2004, she was one of several Republicans to oppose accelerated implementation of the George W. Bush administration's tax cuts, citing budget concerns.

=== Foreign policy and national security ===
In national security and foreign affairs, Snowe supported President Bill Clinton's engagement in the Kosovo War. Following the September 11 attacks, she supported President George W. Bush's invasions of Afghanistan in 2001 and Iraq in 2003.

=== Gay rights ===
In Snowe's 2006 re-election campaign, she was one of two Republican Senate candidates endorsed by Human Rights Campaign, a gay rights organization. Snowe supports abortion rights and gay rights. In 2004, she voted against the Federal Marriage Amendment, an amendment banning gay marriage. In 2006, she voted against banning gay marriage for a second time. While she initially voted to block repeal of "Don't ask, don't tell" legislation, she was one of eight Republican senators to vote for the act's repeal on December 18, 2010, ending the policy.

=== Health care policy ===
"In October 2009, Snowe was the sole Republican in the Senate to vote for the Finance Committee’s health care reform bill", according to Politico. However, she stated that she might not support the final bill due to strong reservations. Snowe was one of three Republicans to break with their party and vote with Democrats to end a filibuster on a defense spending bill; the filibuster was meant to delay or stop a vote on health care legislation. In December 2009, Snowe voted against cloture on two procedural motions and against the Senate Health Care Reform Bill. In 2010, Snowe voted against the Health Care and Education Act. In 2005 and 2007, she voted to support embryonic stem cell research.

=== Organizational memberships ===
Snowe is a member of the Republican Main Street Partnership, Republicans for Environmental Protection, Republican Majority for Choice, Republicans for Choice, and The Wish List, a political organization of pro-choice female U.S. senators and Representatives.

== Post-Senate career ==
In April 2013, after retiring from the U.S. Senate, Snowe announced her support for same-sex marriage.

In June 2013, Snowe was appointed to the board of directors of T. Rowe Price, a Baltimore-based Fortune 1000 investment management firm.

In January 2015, she said that she considered Jeb Bush and Hillary Clinton the least partisan 2016 presidential candidates. In the 2016 presidential election, she opposed Donald Trump as the Republican nominee.

On January 9, 2021, following the January 6 Capitol violence, Snowe called on Trump to "resign from office now to allow our nation to begin to heal and prepare for the transition to the Biden presidency".

== Olympia Snowe Women's Leadership Institute ==
The Olympia Snowe Women's Leadership Institute was founded by Snowe after retiring from the Senate in 2013. It offers a three-year program in leadership training in partnership with Maine high schools. By 2024, the institute had trained more than 700 Maine students. In 2024, the institute signed a charter agreement to establish its first alumni chapter at the University of Southern Maine.

== Electoral history ==
Maine U.S. Senate Election, 2006
Party	Candidate	Votes	%	±%
Republican	Olympia Snowe (incumbent)	405,596	74.01%	
Democratic	Jean Hay Bright	113,131	20.59%	
Independent	William H. Slavick	26,222	5.37%	

Maine U.S. Senate Election, 2000
Party	Candidate	Votes	%	±%
Republican	Olympia Snowe (incumbent)	437,689	68.94%	
Democratic	Mark Lawrence	197,183	31.06%	

Maine U.S. Senate Election, 1994
Party	Candidate	Votes	%	±%
Republican	Olympia Snowe	308,244	60.24%	
Democratic	Tom Andrews	186,042	36.36%	
Independent	Plato Truman	17,205	3.36%	

Maine's 2nd congressional district election, 1992
Party	Candidate	Votes	%	±%
Republican	Olympia Snowe (incumbent)	153,022	49.13%	
Democratic	Patrick K. McGowan	130,824	42.01%	
Green	Jonathan K. Carter	27,526	8.84%	

Maine's 2nd congressional district election, 1990
Party	Candidate	Votes	%	±%
Republican	Olympia Snowe (incumbent)	121,704	51.02%	
Democratic	Patrick K. McGowan	116,798	48.97%	

Maine's 2nd congressional district election, 1988
Party	Candidate	Votes	%	±%
Republican	Olympia Snowe (incumbent)	167,226	66.17%	
Democratic	Kenneth P. Hayes	85,346	33.77%	

Maine's 2nd congressional district election, 1986
Party	Candidate	Votes	%	±%
Republican	Olympia Snowe (incumbent)	148,770	77.32%	
Democratic	Richard R. Charette	43,614	22.67%	

Maine's 2nd congressional district election, 1984
Party	Candidate	Votes	%	±%
Republican	Olympia Snowe (incumbent)	192,166	75.72%	
Democratic	Chipman C. Bull	57,347	22.60%	
Constitution	Kenneth E. Stoddard	4,242	1.67%	

Maine's 2nd congressional district election, 1982
Party	Candidate	Votes	%	±%
Republican	Olympia Snowe (incumbent)	136,075	66.65%	
Democratic	James Patrick Dunleavy	68,086	33.35%	

Maine's 2nd congressional district election, 1980
Party	Candidate	Votes	%	±%
Republican	Olympia Snowe (incumbent)	186,406	78.50%	
Democratic	Harold L. Silverman	51,026	21.49%	

Maine's 2nd congressional district election, 1978
Party	Candidate	Votes	%	±%
Republican	Olympia Snowe	87,939	50.82%	
Democratic	Markham J. Gartley	70,691	40.85%	
Independent	Frederick W. Whittaker	8,035	4.64%	
Independent	Eddie Shurtleff	1,923	1.11%	
Independent	Robert H. Burmeister	1,653	0.96%	
Independent	Margaret E. Cousins	1,573	0.91%	
Independent	Robert L. Cousins	1,223	0.71%	

== See also ==
- Rockefeller Republican
- Women in the United States House of Representatives
- Women in the United States Senate

U.S. House of Representatives
Preceded by Bill Cohen	Member of the U.S. House of Representatives from Maine's 2nd congressional district 1979–1995	Succeeded by John Baldacci
Honorary titles
Preceded by Constance Brennan	First Lady of Maine; 1989–1995	Succeeded by Mary Herman
Party political offices
Preceded by Jasper Wyman	Republican nominee for U.S. Senator from Maine (Class 1); 1994, 2000, 2006	Succeeded by Charlie Summers
U.S. Senate
Preceded by George Mitchell	U.S. Senator (Class 1) from Maine; 1995–2013; Served alongside: William Cohen, Susan Collins	Succeeded by Angus King
Preceded by John Kerry	Chair of the Senate Small Business Committee; 2003–2007	Succeeded by John Kerry
Preceded by John Kerry	Ranking Member of the Small Business Committee; 2007–2013	Succeeded by Jim Risch
U.S. order of precedence (ceremonial)
Preceded by Mary Landrieu as Former U.S. Senator	Order of precedence of the United States as Former U.S. Senator	Succeeded by John Danforth as Former U.S. Senator
