= Senator Andrew =

Senator Andrew may refer to:

- Charles A. Andrew (1857–1932), Maryland State Senate
- John F. Andrew (1850–1895), Massachusetts State Senate

== See also ==
- Senator Andrews (disambiguation)
