= Tom Carper =

American politician (born 1947)

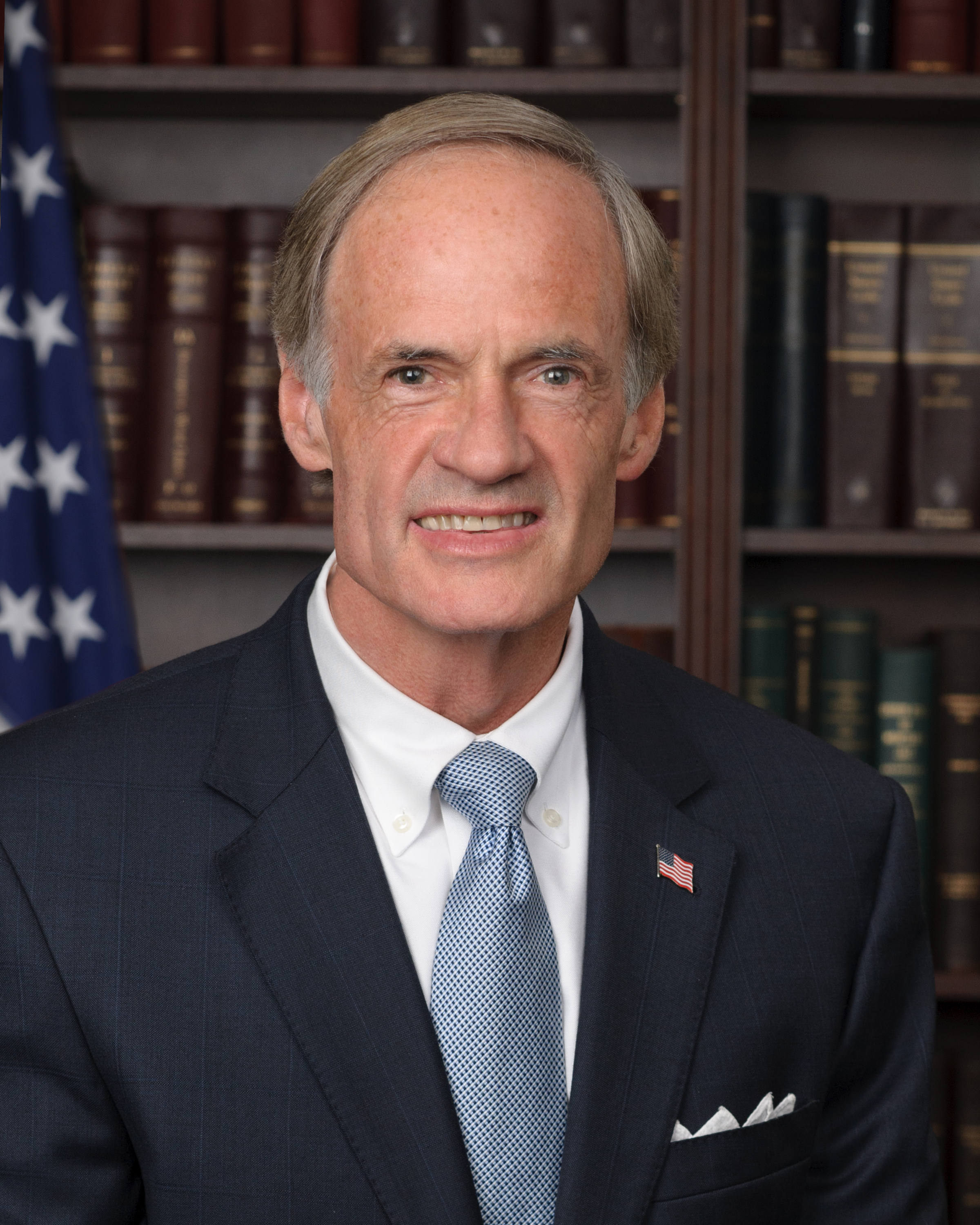
- Official portrait, 2012

United States Senator from Delaware
- In office January 3, 2001 – January 3, 2025
- Preceded by: William Roth
- Succeeded by: Lisa Blunt Rochester
Senate positions
Chair of the Senate Environment Committee
In office February 3, 2021 – January 3, 2025
Preceded by	John Barrasso
Succeeded by	Shelley Moore Capito
Ranking Member of the Senate Environment Committee
In office January 3, 2017 – February 3, 2021
Preceded by	Barbara Boxer
Succeeded by	Shelley Moore Capito
Chair of the Senate Homeland Security Committee
In office January 3, 2013 – January 3, 2015
Preceded by	Joe Lieberman
Succeeded by	Ron Johnson

71st Governor of Delaware
- In office January 19, 1993 – January 3, 2001
- Lieutenant: Ruth Ann Minner
- Preceded by: Dale E. Wolf
- Succeeded by: Ruth Ann Minner

Chair of the National Governors Association
- In office August 4, 1998 – August 10, 1999
- Preceded by: George Voinovich
- Succeeded by: Mike Leavitt

Member of the U.S. House of Representatives from Delaware's at-large district
- In office January 3, 1983 – January 3, 1993
- Preceded by: Tom Evans
- Succeeded by: Mike Castle

Treasurer of Delaware
- In office January 18, 1977 – January 3, 1983
- Governor: Pete du Pont
- Preceded by: Mary Jornlin
- Succeeded by: Janet Rzewnicki

Personal details
- Born: Thomas Richard Carper; January 23, 1947 (age 79) Beckley, West Virginia, U.S.
- Party: Democratic
- Spouses: Diane Isaacs (m. 1978; div. 1983); Martha Stacy (m. 1985)
- Children: 2
- Education: Ohio State University (BA); University of Delaware (MBA)
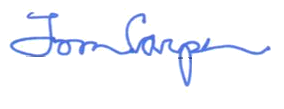
- Signature

Military service
- Branch: United States Navy
- Service years: 1968–1973 (active); 1973–1991 (reserve)
- Rank: Captain
- Unit: Naval Flight Officer
- Conflict: Vietnam War
- Carper's voice Carper supporting Rita Landgraf for Assistant Secretary of HHS for Aging. Recorded July 19, 2021

Thomas Richard Carper (born January 23, 1947) is an American politician and former military officer who served from 2001 to 2025 as a United States senator from Delaware. A member of the Democratic Party, Carper served from 1983 to 1993 in the United States House of Representatives and from 1993 to 2001 as the 71st governor of Delaware.

A native of Beckley, West Virginia, Carper graduated from Ohio State University on an NROTC scholarship. Serving as a naval flight officer in the U.S. Navy from 1968 until 1973, he flew the P-3 Orion as a tactical coordinator and mission commander and saw active duty in the Vietnam War. After leaving the active duty Navy, he remained in the U.S. Naval Reserve for another 18 years and eventually retired with the rank of Captain (O-6). Upon receiving his MBA from the University of Delaware in 1975, Carper went to work for the state of Delaware in its economic development office. He was elected state treasurer, serving from 1977 to 1983 and leading the development of Delaware's first cash management system.

Encouraged by local politicians, Carper successfully ran for Delaware's only seat in the U.S. House of Representatives in 1982. He served five terms in the House, where he chaired the Subcommittee on Economic Stabilization. In 1992, he swapped positions with term-limited Republican Governor Mike Castle, and the two were easily elected to each other's seats. Carper governed for two terms as a moderate, business-oriented New Democrat, following the lead of the two previous Republican governors.

Carper was elected to the U.S. Senate in 2000, defeating Republican incumbent William Roth. He was reelected by landslides in 2006, 2012, and 2018. He served as one of four deputy Democratic whips, the chairman of the Senate Environment and Public Works Committee and on the Homeland Security and Governmental Affairs Committee and the Finance Committee. Carper was the senior senator in Delaware's congressional delegation and the dean of the delegation. He was the last Vietnam War veteran to serve in the Senate.

== Early life and education ==
Carper was born in Beckley, West Virginia, the son of Mary Jean (née Patton) and Wallace Richard Carper. He grew up in Danville, Virginia, and graduated from Whetstone High School in Columbus, Ohio. He then graduated from the Ohio State University in 1968, where he was a midshipman in the Naval ROTC and earned a Bachelor of Arts degree in economics. At Ohio State, Carper became a member of the Beta Phi Chapter of the Delta Tau Delta fraternity. Carper earned an MBA from the University of Delaware in 1975.

== Early career ==
Serving as a Naval Flight Officer in the U.S. Navy from 1968 until 1973, he served three tours of duty in Southeast Asia during the Vietnam War. He remained in the U.S. Naval Reserve as a P-3 aircraft mission commander for another 18 years, stationed with VP-66 at NAS Willow Grove in Pennsylvania. He retired with the rank of Captain (O-6).

While in college at the Ohio State University, Carper worked on the presidential campaign of U.S. Senator Eugene McCarthy. In Delaware, he worked as the campaign treasurer for University of Delaware professor James R. Soles in his unsuccessful 1974 bid for the U.S. House of Representatives.

After receiving his MBA degree in 1975, Carper went to work for the State of Delaware's economic development office. In 1976, after developing good relationships with members of the state party leadership, he took out a $5,000 personal loan to fund his campaign to be Treasurer of Delaware. In the election, he defeated the favored Republican Party candidate, Theodore Jones. He served three terms, from January 18, 1977, through January 3, 1983, during which time he oversaw the development of Delaware's first cash management system.

== U.S. House of Representatives ==
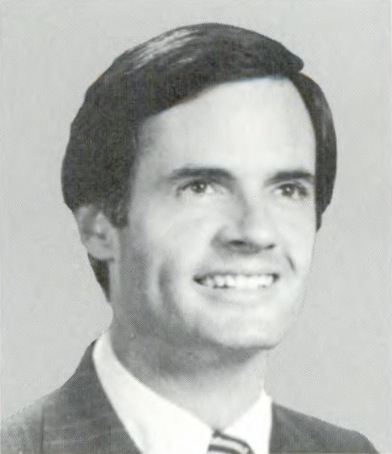
Carper during his time in the House of Representatives

In 1982, U.S. Senator Joe Biden and other prominent Democrats convinced Carper to run for Delaware's only seat in the U.S. House of Representatives. Incumbent Republican Thomas B. Evans Jr. sought reelection, and although he had been caught in a compromising "association" on a golfing trip with the lobbyist Paula Parkinson, was still considered a strong candidate.

Carper was considered well-positioned until three weeks before Election Day, when the New York Post published an article claiming that the "dirtiest campaign in the country is being waged in tiny Delaware", which suggested that Carper had abused his wife and stepchildren. Carper and his wife denied the allegations at the time. According to Delaware political journalist Celia Cohen, rumors that the story had been placed by a supporter of Evans led many voters to view the allegations as an exploitation of a private matter, and Carper's campaign recovered. In a 1998 interview, Carper admitted that he had once slapped his wife during an argument, while maintaining that the Post's other claims were false. Carper defeated Evans.

Carper served five terms in the House. He won his second term in 1984, defeating Elise R. W. du Pont, the wife of retiring Governor Pete du Pont. He then easily defeated Republicans Thomas S. Neuberger in 1986, James P. Krapf in 1988 and Ralph O. Williams in 1990. He was a member of the U.S. House Committee on Banking, Finance and Urban Affairs and the U.S. House Committee on Merchant Marine and Fisheries. He chaired the House Subcommittee on Economic Stabilization. In these positions, he worked to allow banks into the securities business and to discourage the dumping of sludge into the ocean.

During his years in the House, Carper sought to gain better control of Delaware's Democratic Party organization in hopes of someday becoming governor, focusing on heavily Democratic and populous New Castle County. Its Democratic organization was controlled by Eugene T. Reed, a former ironworker and longtime party boss who was then among several politicians in both parties implicated in illegal money raising practices. To address this corruption and rescue the Democratic Party's reputation, Carper recruited Joseph E. Reardon, a DuPont Company chemist, as a candidate for New Castle County Democratic Party chairman. By early 1989, Reardon had been elected, replacing Reed at the head of a newly reformed party organization. In 1990, Carper defeated a Reed ally, Daniel D. Rappa, in the Democratic primary for U.S. representative.

== Governor of Delaware ==
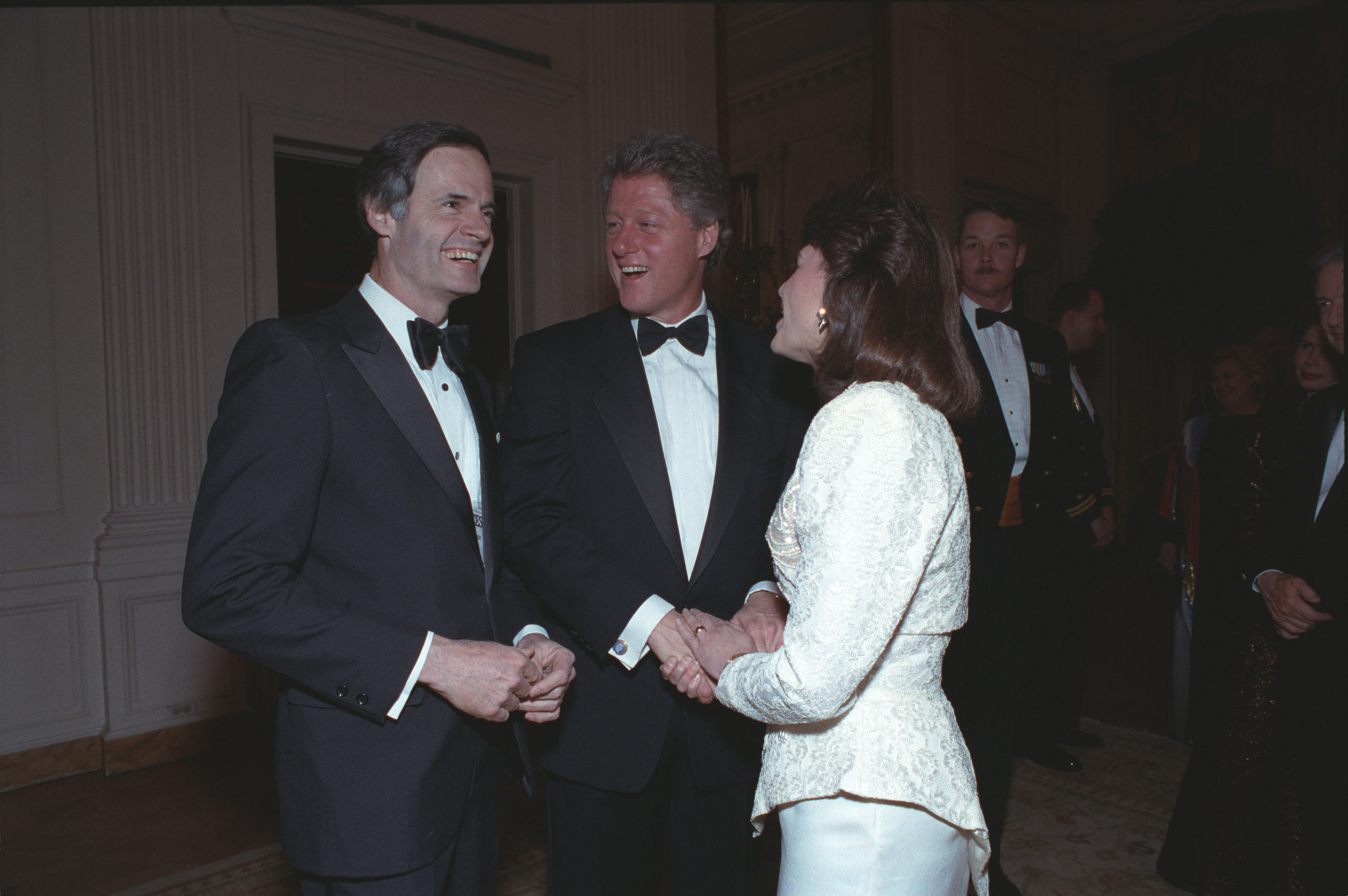
Carper with President Bill Clinton in January 1993

Republican Governor Michael Castle was term-limited and unable to seek reelection in 1992. The result was what became known as "the Swap", with Castle seeking Carper's seat in the U.S. House of Representatives and Carper seeking the governorship. Neither faced substantive opposition for either post.

Carper defeated Republican B. Gary Scott and was elected governor. He served two terms. Carper positioned himself as a moderate, business-oriented governor, emphasizing economic development and business recruitment. This included the prevention of the closure of the General Motors automobile operation near Newport, Delaware, and convincing pharmaceutical giant AstraZeneca to construct its new headquarters in the state.

Carper led an ongoing effort to reduce income tax rates, eliminate the marriage penalty and estate tax, cut the public utility tax, and eliminate the gross receipts tax for many small businesses. Delaware's credit rating improved from among the worst in the nation to AAA. Carper also retained Castle's standards-based education programs. Other programs included a fully funded Head Start program and a prescription-drug benefit for seniors.

Carper had high approval ratings, but was criticized by some old-line Democrats and union leaders.

As a tribute to Anne Marie Fahey, who had been a youth mentor before her death, then-Governor Carper also became a mentor, and began actively promoting mentoring programs throughout Delaware's business community. As a result, by the end of his last term, Delaware held the highest per-capita ratio of youth mentors in the country. Carper also established the Delaware Mentoring Council to help sustain this legacy.

Delaware General Assembly (sessions while Governor)
Year	Assembly	Senate Majority	President pro tempore	House Majority	Speaker
1993–1994	137th	Democratic	Richard S. Cordrey	Republican	Terry R. Spence
1995–1996	138th	Democratic	Richard S. Cordrey	Republican	Terry R. Spence
1997–1998	139th	Democratic	Thomas B. Sharp	Republican	Terry R. Spence
1999–2000	140th	Democratic	Thomas B. Sharp	Republican	Terry R. Spence

== U. S. Senator ==
=== Elections ===
==== 2000 ====
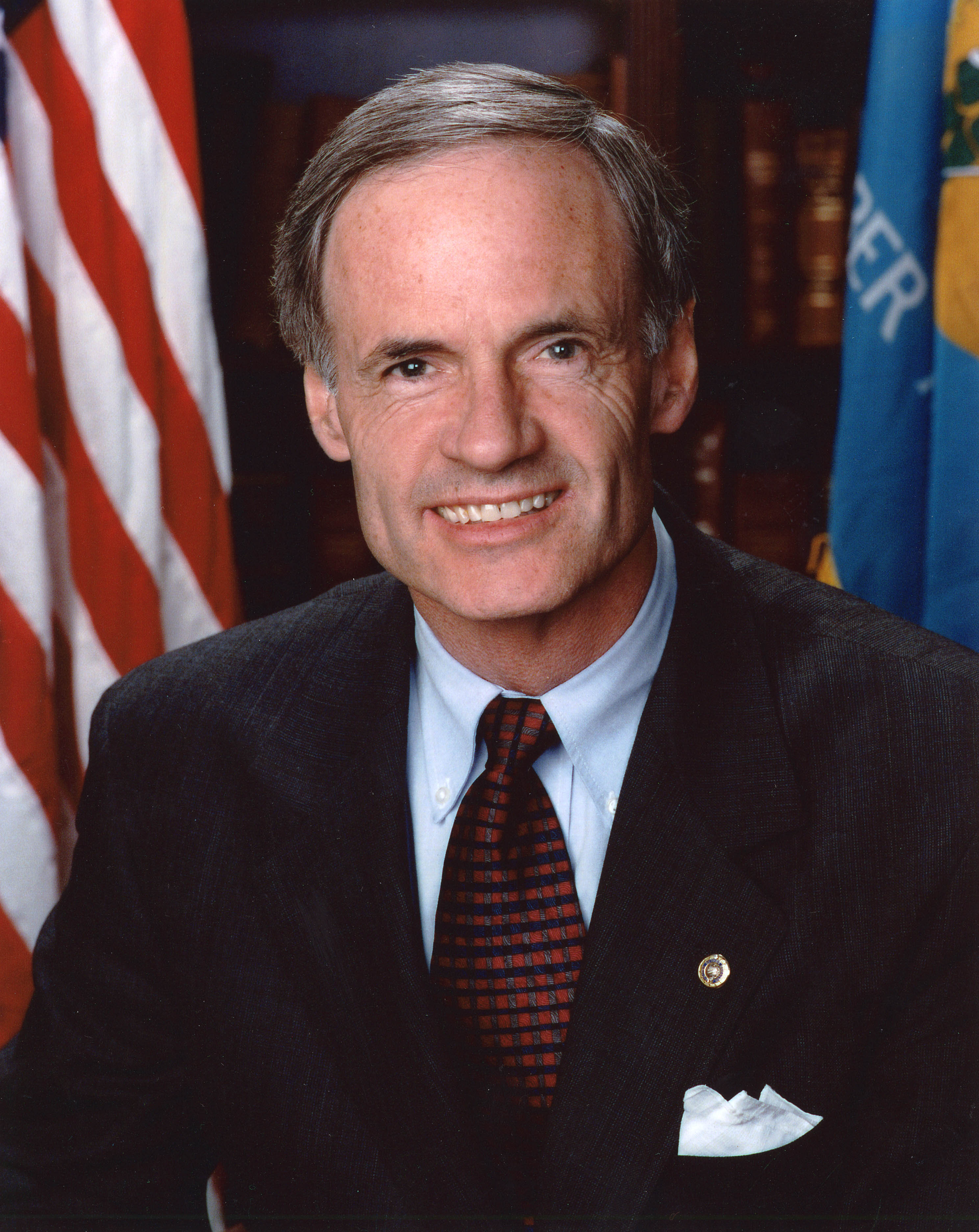
Carper in his early Senate career

Due to term limits, Carper had to retire as governor in 2000, and sought election to the U.S. Senate against incumbent Republican William Roth, declaring his candidacy in September 1999. Some had concerns about Roth's age of 79, compared to Carper's relative youth. Roth started the campaign with a 2-to-1 spending advantage, but Carper went into the final month with more than $1 million on hand. He defeated Roth, 56% to 44%. Roth received more votes than Republican presidential candidate George W. Bush, suggesting that the strength of the Democratic turnout for the presidential election was key in Carper's victory. Some commentators attributed Roth's defeat to his age and health, as he collapsed twice during the campaign, once during a television interview and once during a campaign event.

==== 2006 ====
Carper sought reelection in 2006. He was unopposed in the Democratic primary and faced Republican nominee Jan C. Ting, a professor of law who had narrowly beaten airline pilot Michael D. Protack in the Republican primary. Carper was easily reelected, 67% to 27%.

==== 2012 ====
As the 2012 election cycle began, a Super PAC was created to oppose Carper's reelection campaign. The Hill quoted Patrick Davis, the custodian of records and agent for Renew Delaware as saying, "Tom Carper has served in the United States Senate for a long time and has been part of the downturn in our economy." Delaware Politics noted that the election would be costly for the Republican candidate and that Carper was heavily favored to win a third term. A Carper spokesperson, Emily Spain, was quoted in The Hill saying that Carper was successful in his previous campaigns "because he works hard, takes nothing for granted, and puts the needs and interests of Delaware first." Carper won the Democratic primary with 88% of the vote and faced off against the only Republican candidate who filed for the race, businessman Kevin Wade. He was reelected with 66% of the vote.

==== 2018 ====
In 2018, Carper sought his fourth Senate term. His campaign contributors included DuPont, his third-largest contributor since 2013. Between 2013 and 2018, he received $2.1 million from political action committees. In the Democratic primary, Carper was challenged from the left by Kerri Evelyn Harris, a US Air Force Veteran, who, unlike Carper, supports a single-payer healthcare. Carper won the primary with roughly 65% of the vote. It was his most competitive primary in recent history. In the general election, Carper defeated Republican nominee Rob Arlett, 60.0% to 37.8%.

==== 2024 ====
On May 22, 2023, Carper announced that he would not seek reelection in 2024. In his press conference, Carper endorsed U.S. Representative Lisa Blunt Rochester.

==== 2025 ====
Senator Carper retired from the United States Senate on January 3, 2025. He was the last remaining combat veteran of the Vietnam War serving in the U.S. Senate.

=== Tenure ===
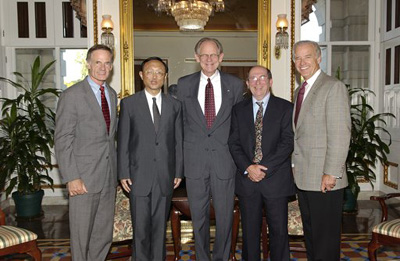
From L to R: Sen. Carper, Chinese Ambassador to the U.S. Yang Jiechi, Rep. Mike Castle, Rep. Wayne Gilchrest, and Sen. Joe Biden, October 2004

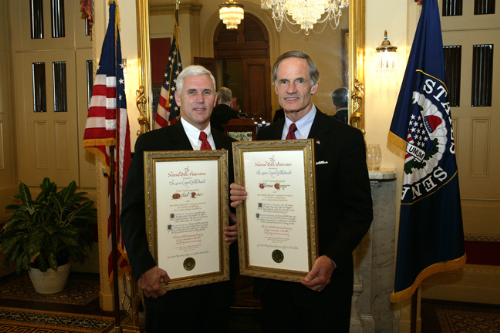
Sen. Carper with Rep. Mike Pence, May 2006

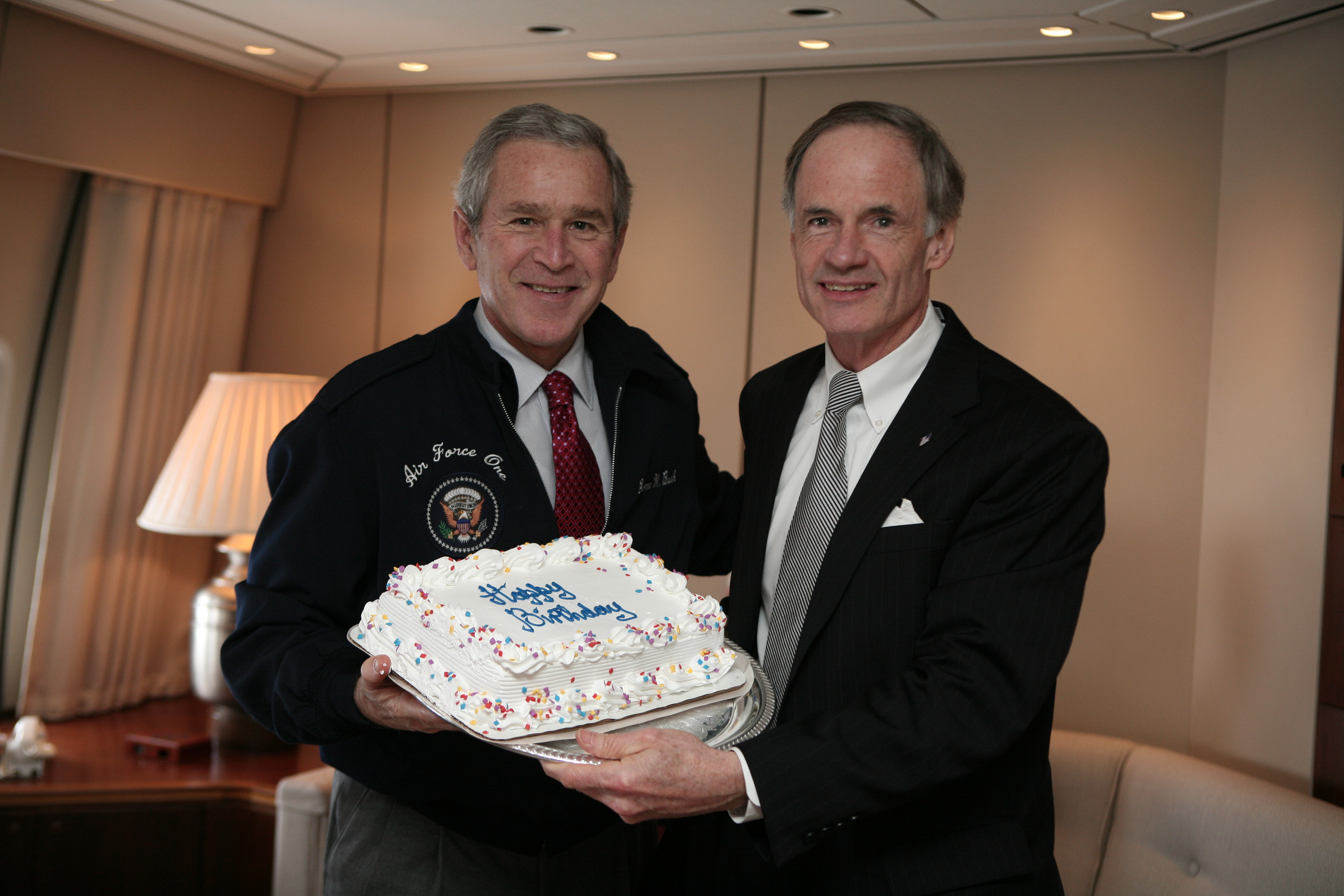
Carper with President George W. Bush in January 2007

Carper served with the Democratic minority in the 108th and 109th Congresses and was part of the Democratic majority in the 110th Congress. At the beginning of the 107th Congress, the Democratic Party was in the minority, but later held the majority. Carper was a member of the moderate Democratic Leadership Council (DLC), of which he served as vice chair. In 2004, Carper became part of the Senate Democratic leadership. As a member of a four-person "Executive Committee", he was one of four deputy whips. David Broder of The Washington Post has called Carper "a notably effective and non-partisan leader, admired and trusted on both sides of the aisle."

During the January 6 United States Capitol attack, Carper said he did not support invoking the Twenty-fifth Amendment to the United States Constitution or impeachment of Trump. But hours later, he called on Trump to resign. He also called the attackers "domestic terrorists". That evening, he voted to certify the 2021 United States Electoral College vote count.

==== Third Circuit Vacancy During Senator Carper's Final Year in Office and Ultimate Conservative Shift ====
Senator Carper, Senator Coons, and President Biden declined to select a nominee for a judicial vacancy on the Third Circuit in President Biden's home state of Delaware even though the vacancy was announced in May 2024, more than eight months before President Biden's four-year term in office ended. The White House's and the Delaware U.S. Senate delegation's decision not to fill the Third Circuit vacancy in President Biden's home state of Delaware, along with President Biden's unsuccessful nomination of Adeel A. Mangi to another Third Circuit vacancy, allowed President Trump to fill both seats in 2025 and flip the Third Circuit to a conservative majority. President Trump ultimately nominated Jennifer Mascott, who had never taken the Delaware bar exam and was not licensed to practice law in Delaware, to the vacancy that Carper, Coons, and President Biden declined to fill in Biden's home state.

=== Committee assignments ===
Carper's committee assignments for the 118th Congress are as follows:

- Committee on Environment and Public Works (chair)
  - As chair, Carper is an ex officio member of all subcommittees.
- Committee on Finance
  - Subcommittee on Energy, Natural Resources, and Infrastructure
  - Subcommittee on Health Care
  - Subcommittee on International Trade, Customs, and Global Competitiveness (chair)
- Committee on Homeland Security and Governmental Affairs
  - Permanent Subcommittee on Investigations
  - Subcommittee on Government Operations and Border Management

=== Caucus membership ===
- Senate Oceans Caucus

== Political positions ==
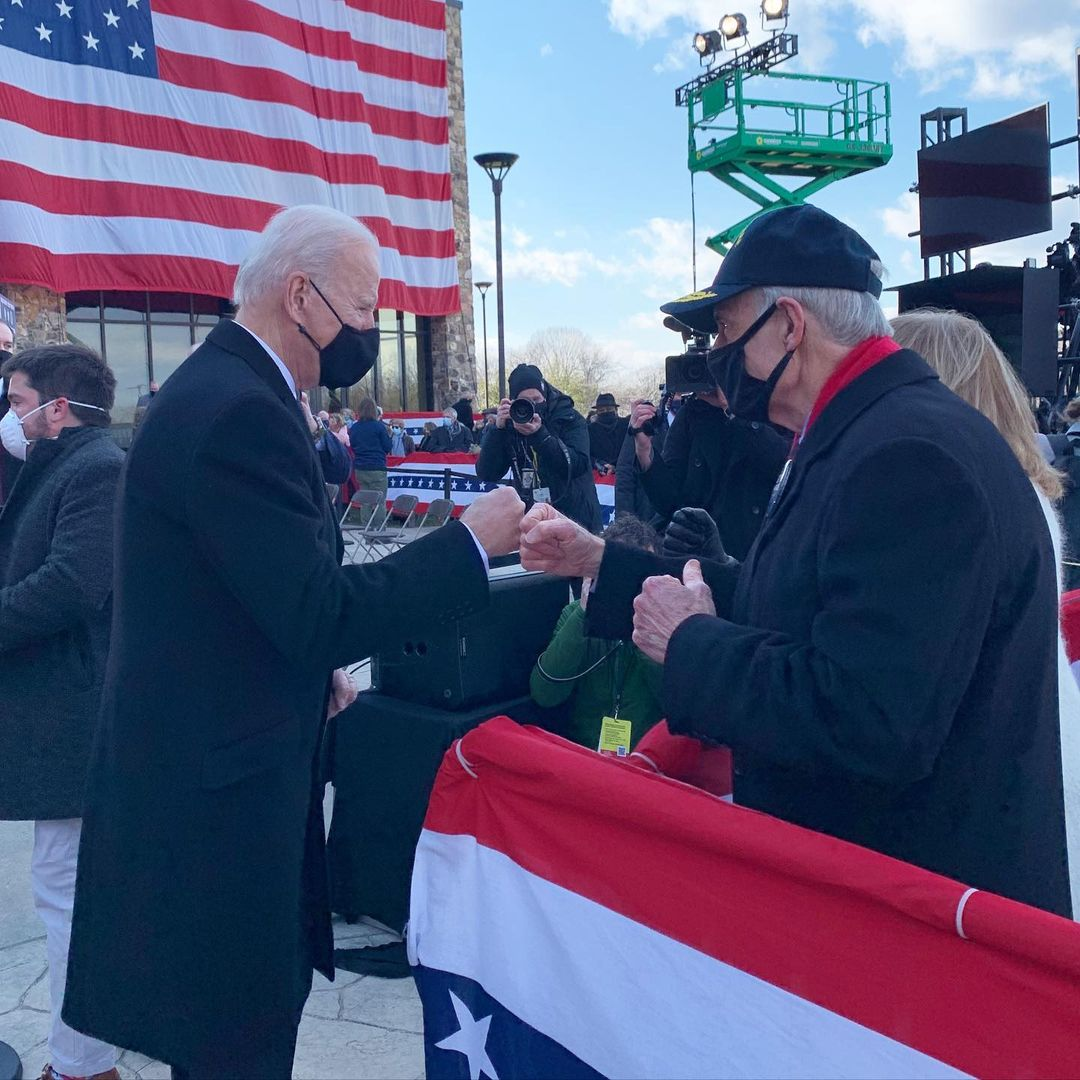
Carper with President-elect Joe Biden in January 2021

Carper is considered a moderate Democrat. He has a 13% conservative rating from the American Conservative Union. Carper voted for the Budget Control Act, against cut, cap and balance, for debt increase, for debt ceiling increase, for debt limit increase, for the stimulus, for TARP, for the Patient Protection and Affordable Care Act, for SCHIP, for DREAM, and for the Immigration Reform Act of 2006.

=== Abortion ===
Carper has a mixed record on abortion issues. In 2003, he was one of 17 Democrats who broke with the majority of their party by voting to ban partial-birth abortion. He also voted against banning abortion after 20 weeks of pregnancy, but voted to ban the use of federal funds for abortion. In 2018, he opposed President Trump's proposal to defund Planned Parenthood. Carper was given a 50% rating by NARAL Pro-Choice America, indicating a mixed record on abortion, according to their scoring, and a 25% rating from the anti-abortion National Right to Life Committee. After Roe v. Wade was overturned in June 2022, he said the decision was "unconscionably cruel and wrong" and that it was a "dark day for our country and our Constitution."

=== Foreign policy ===
In April 2019, Carper was one of 34 senators to sign a letter to President Donald Trump encouraging him "to listen to members of your own Administration and reverse a decision that will damage our national security and aggravate conditions inside Central America", asserting that Trump had "consistently expressed a flawed understanding of U.S. foreign assistance" since becoming president and that he was "personally undermining efforts to promote U.S. national security and economic prosperity" through preventing the use of Fiscal Year 2018 national security funding. The senators argued that foreign assistance to Central American countries created less migration to the U.S., citing the funding's helping to improve conditions in those countries.

In January 2024, Carper voted against a resolution, proposed by Bernie Sanders, to apply the human rights provisions of the Foreign Assistance Act to U.S. aid to Israel's military. The proposal was defeated, 72 to 11. In March 2024, Carper led a letter to the Biden administration urging the U.S. to recognize a "nonmilitarized" Palestinian state after the war in Gaza. This letter was signed by 19 Democratic senators who support a two-state solution to the Israeli-Palestine conflict.

=== Gun law ===
Carper joined 23 other Senate Democrats in signing a letter supporting Obama taking executive action to reduce gun violence. In 2013, he voted to ban high-capacity magazines of over 10 bullets. In 2016, Carper participated in the Chris Murphy gun control filibuster. In response to the 2017 Las Vegas shooting, Carper called for more gun laws, specifically background checks and mental health screenings.

In January 2019, Carper was one of 40 senators to introduce the Background Check Expansion Act, a bill that would require background checks for either the sale or transfer of all firearms including all unlicensed sellers. Exceptions to the bill's background check requirement included transfers between members of law enforcement, loaning firearms for either hunting or sporting events on a temporary basis, providing firearms as gifts to members of one's immediate family, firearms being transferred as part of an inheritance, or giving a firearm to another person temporarily for immediate self-defense.

=== Finance and economy ===
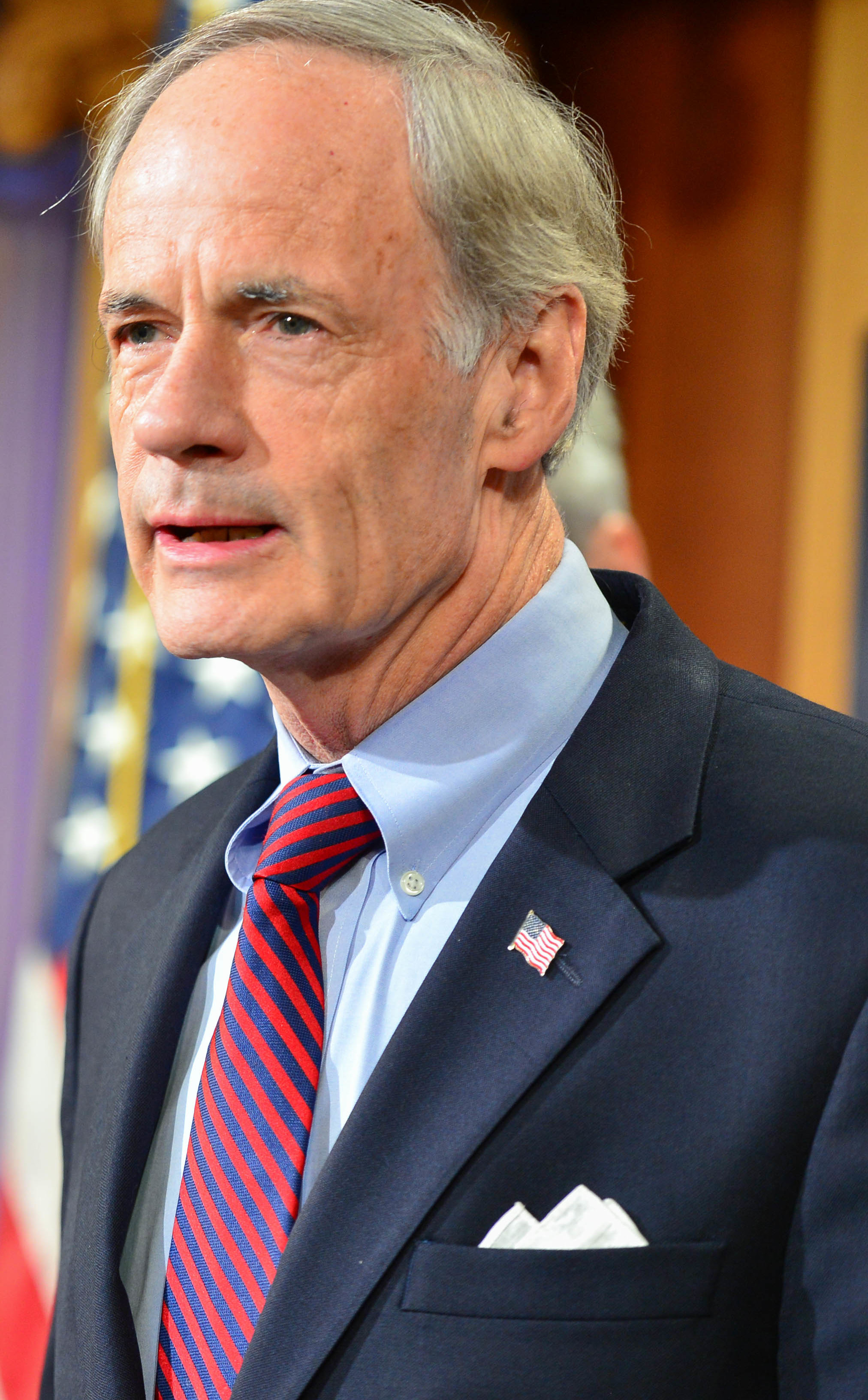
Carper in 2015

He joined in the unsuccessful attempt to tie the Bush tax cuts to deficit reduction and has supported additional funding for school choice programs and charter schools. He has also sought additional funding for railroad projects and for rail security. He strongly supported legislation to limit class action lawsuits and to restrict personal bankruptcy. In addition, he is a strong proponent of free trade. In 2012, Carper sponsored a bill, eventually passed and signed into law, that required government agencies to identify $125 billion in expected waste and fraud.

Carper and George Voinovich of Ohio proposed a 25-cent raise in the federal gasoline tax; 10 cents would go to pay down the debt and the rest toward improving the nation's infrastructure. The measure was proposed in November 2010. The measure did not pass.

On May 14, 2011, The Wall Street Journal criticized a postal-bailout bill co-sponsored by Carper and Susan Collins (R-Maine). The bill would give $50–$75 billion to USPS, and would underwrite pension obligations for retired postal workers. The bailout would cost three times the savings of the 2011 federal budget.

On August 1, 2019, the Senate passed a bipartisan budget deal that raised spending over current levels by $320 billion and lifted the debt ceiling for the following two years in addition to forming a course for funding the government without the perceived fiscal brinkmanship of recent years. Carper joined Joe Manchin and Republicans Mitt Romney and Rick Scott in issuing a statement asserting that "as former Governors, we were responsible for setting a budget each year that was fiscally responsible to fund our priorities. That's why today, we, as U.S. Senators, cannot bring ourselves to vote for this budget deal that does not put our country on a fiscally sustainable path."

=== Environment ===
Carper proposed the creation of a National Park in Delaware, the Coastal Heritage Park, in four locations along the Delaware River and Delaware Bay. In January 2009, Carper briefly chaired a Senate Committee on Environment and Public Works hearing on the Tennessee Valley Authority's coal ash spill in Kingston, Tennessee. However, he did vote for Keystone XL Pipeline, but has since expressed disappointment in that vote.

Carper supports the EPA and Clean Air Act and blames states to the west of Delaware for its air pollution, calling them "America's tailpipe".

=== Housing ===
In April 2019, Carper was one of 41 senators to sign a bipartisan letter to the housing subcommittee praising the Housing and Urban Development Department's Section 4 Capacity Building program as authorizing "HUD to partner with national nonprofit community development organizations to provide education, training, and financial support to local community development corporations (CDCs) across the country" and expressing disappointment that President Trump's budget "has slated this program for elimination after decades of successful economic and community development." The senators wrote of their hope that the subcommittee would support continued funding for Section 4 in Fiscal Year 2020.

=== Technology ===
Carper co-wrote the "Protecting Cyberspace as a National Asset Act of 2010" introduced on June 19, 2010, by Senator Joe Lieberman (Senator Susan Collins is the third co-author of this bill). The bill, which generated controversy and was dubbed by the American media as the "Kill switch bill", would grant the President emergency powers over the Internet. All three co-authors of the bill, however, issued a statement claiming that instead, the bill "[narrowed] existing broad Presidential authority to take over telecommunications networks". Carper was quoted as saying that the bill "would create a National Center for Cybersecurity and Communications in the Department of Homeland Security, with a Senate-confirmed director to oversee security of the federal government's computer networks. The center would also identify vulnerabilities and help secure key private networks – like utilities and communications systems – that, if attacked or commandeered by a foreign power or cyberterrorists, could result in the crippling of our economy."

=== Consumer regulations ===
In May 2010, Carper introduced an amendment to limit state regulators from enforcing consumer regulations on national banks and their subsidiaries. It would also remove a Senate legislative measure requiring the Office of the Comptroller of the Currency to find a "substantive standard" on regulation, before the office could move to preempt. The White House opposed Carper's amendment. The amendment passed by a vote of 80–18.

=== Employment ===
==== Jobs bill ====
On September 21, 2011, The Wall Street Journal noted that President Barack Obama's job-creation plans were drawing resistance from Senate Democrats. The article quoted Carper as saying, "I think the best jobs bill that can be passed is a comprehensive long-term deficit-reduction plan. That's better than everything else the president is talking about combined."

==== Minimum wage ====
In April 2014, the United States Senate debated the Minimum Wage Fairness Act (S. 1737; 113th Congress). The bill would amend the Fair Labor Standards Act of 1938 (FLSA) to increase the federal minimum wage for employees to $10.10 per hour over the course of a two-year period. The bill was strongly supported by President Barack Obama and many of the Democratic Senators, but strongly opposed by Republicans in the Senate and House. Carper said that he preferred legislation that would have a greater chance of becoming law, such as an increase to only $9 an hour.

On March 5, 2021, Carper voted against Bernie Sanders's amendment to include a $15/hour minimum wage in the American Rescue Plan Act of 2021.

=== LGBT rights ===
Carper signed a law as Governor defining "marriage as between a man and a woman," but he also voted as a Senator against the Federal Marriage Amendment, a proposed constitutional amendment to ban gay marriage. He also voted against banning gay marriage again in 2006. In 2013, Carper announced that he now supports same-sex marriage.

=== Iraq War ===
Carper voted yes on the 2002 Iraq War Resolution.

== Personal life ==
Carper has been married twice, first in 1978, to Diane Beverly Isaacs, a former Miss Delaware, who had two children by a previous marriage. They divorced in 1983. In a 1998 interview, Carper admitted, "I slapped my then-wife, Diane, during a heated argument," calling it a mistake. According to a 1982 New York Post article, Carper hit Isaacs "so hard he gave her a black eye" and his wife's two children from a previous relationship "were slapped around and bruised by Carper for doing such things as leaving the family dog on the bed." Carper denied these claims.

Carper married Martha Ann Stacy in 1985. They have two children. The family are members of Westminster Presbyterian Church in Wilmington, Delaware.

Unlike most senators, who maintain residences in both Washington, D.C., and in their home state, Carper commuted more than 100 miles by Amtrak train from his home in Wilmington to the United States Capitol. He said this arrangement helped his family live a normal life despite his demanding, high-profile job. On May 12, 2015, he narrowly escaped injury when the train he took home derailed and crashed in Philadelphia shortly after he debarked. In 2024, Newark Train Station was renamed in his honor.

=== Finances ===
As of 2018, according to OpenSecrets.org, Carper's net worth was more than $5.7 million.

In August 2023, Congresstrading.com tweeted that Carper, a senior member of the Senate Finance Committee, made an inverse Nasdaq ETF purchase, a short sell option for investors looking to hedge against or profit from a decline in the index. The tweet questioned whether this was a conflict of interest for Carper.

== Almanac ==
Elections are held the first Tuesday after November 1. The Governor and State Treasurer take office the third Tuesday of January. The Governor has a four-year term and the State Treasurer had a two-year term at this time. U.S. Representatives take office January 3 and have a two-year term. U.S. Senators also take office January 3, but have a six-year term.

Public offices
Office	Type	Location	Began office	Ended office	Notes
State Treasurer	Executive	Dover	January 18, 1977	January 16, 1979	
State Treasurer	Executive	Dover	January 16, 1979	January 20, 1981	
State Treasurer	Executive	Dover	January 20, 1981	January 3, 1983	resigned
U.S. Representative	Legislature	Washington	January 3, 1983	January 3, 1985	
U.S. Representative	Legislature	Washington	January 3, 1985	January 3, 1987	
U.S. Representative	Legislature	Washington	January 3, 1987	January 3, 1989	
U.S. Representative	Legislature	Washington	January 3, 1989	January 3, 1991	
U.S. Representative	Legislature	Washington	January 3, 1991	January 3, 1993	
Governor	Executive	Dover	January 19, 1993	January 21, 1997	
Governor	Executive	Dover	January 21, 1997	January 3, 2001	resigned
U.S. Senator	Legislative	Washington	January 3, 2001	January 3, 2007	
U.S. Senator	Legislative	Washington	January 3, 2007	January 3, 2013	
U.S. Senator	Legislative	Washington	January 3, 2013	January 3, 2019	
U.S. Senator	Legislative	Washington	January 3, 2019	January 3, 2025	

United States Congressional service
Dates	Congress	Chamber	Majority	President	Committees	Class/District
1983–1984	98th	U.S. House	Democratic	Ronald Reagan	Financial Services, Fisheries	at-large
1985–1986	99th	U.S. House	Democratic	Ronald Reagan	Financial Services, Fisheries	at-large
1987–1988	100th	U.S. House	Democratic	Ronald Reagan	Financial Services, Fisheries	at-large
1989–1990	101st	U.S. House	Democratic	George H. W. Bush	Financial Services, Fisheries	at-large
1991–1992	102nd	U.S. House	Democratic	George H. W. Bush	Financial Services, Fisheries	at-large
2001–2002	107th	U.S. Senate	Democratic	George W. Bush	Banking, Environment, Homeland Security, Aging	class 1
2003–2004	108th	U.S. Senate	Republican	George W. Bush	Banking, Environment, Homeland Security, Aging	class 1
2005–2006	109th	U.S. Senate	Republican	George W. Bush	Banking, Environment, Homeland Security, Aging	class 1
2007–2009	110th	U.S. Senate	Democratic	George W. Bush	Banking, Commerce, Environment, Homeland Security, Aging	class 1
2009–2011	111th	U.S. Senate	Democratic	Barack Obama	Environment, Finance, Homeland Security	class 1

Election results
Year	Office	Election	Subject	Party	Votes	%	Opponent	Party	Votes	%
1976	State Treasurer	General	Tom Carper	Democratic	118,159	56%	T. Theodore Jones	Republican	92,472	43%
1978	State Treasurer	General	Tom Carper	Democratic	91,809	59%	Rita Justice	Republican	63,011	40%
1980	State Treasurer	General	Tom Carper	Democratic	125,204	59%	Lynn Jankus	Republican	83,446	40%
1982	U.S. Representative	General	Tom Carper	Democratic	98,533	52%	Thomas B. Evans Jr.	Republican	87,153	46%
1984	U.S. Representative	General	Tom Carper	Democratic	142,070	58%	Elise R. W. du Pont	Republican	100,650	41%
1986	U.S. Representative	General	Tom Carper	Democratic	106,351	66%	Thomas S. Neuberger	Republican	53,767	33%
1988	U.S. Representative	General	Tom Carper	Democratic	158,338	68%	James P. Krapf	Republican	76,179	32%
1990	U.S. Representative	Primary	Tom Carper	Democratic	24,557	90%	Daniel D. Rappa	Democratic	2,676	10%
1990	U.S. Representative	General	Tom Carper	Democratic	116,274	66%	Ralph O. Williams	Republican	58,037	33%
1992	Governor	Primary	Tom Carper	Democratic	36,600	89%	Daniel D. Rappa	Democratic	4,434	11%
1992	Governor	General	Tom Carper	Democratic	179,268	66%	B. Gary Scott	Republican	90,747	34%
1996	Governor	General	Tom Carper	Democratic	188,300	70%	Janet Rzewnicki	Republican	82,654	30%
2000	U.S. Senator	General	Tom Carper	Democratic	181,566	56%	William Roth	Republican	142,891	44%
2006	U.S. Senator	General	Tom Carper	Democratic	170,567	70%	Jan C. Ting	Republican	69,734	29%
2012	U.S. Senator	General	Tom Carper	Democratic	265,374	66%	Kevin Wade	Republican	115,694	29%
2018	U.S. Senator	General	Tom Carper	Democratic	217,385	60%	Rob Arlett	Republican	137,127	37%

== Notes ==
U.S. House of Representatives
Preceded by Tom Evans	Member of the U.S. House of Representatives from Delaware's at-large congressional district 1983–1993	Succeeded by Mike Castle
Political offices
Preceded by Mary Jornlin	Treasurer of Delaware; 1977–1983	Succeeded by Janet Rzewnicki
Preceded by Dale Wolf	Governor of Delaware; 1993–2001	Succeeded by Ruth Ann Minner
Preceded by George Voinovich	Chair of the National Governors Association; 1998–1999	Succeeded by Mike Leavitt
U.S. Senate
Preceded by William Roth	U.S. Senator (Class 1) from Delaware; 2001–2025; Served alongside: Joe Biden, Ted Kaufman, Chris Coons	Succeeded by Lisa Blunt Rochester
Preceded by Bob Graham	Chair of the Senate New Democrat Coalition; 2003–2011; Served alongside: Mary Landrieu	Position abolished
Preceded by Joe Lieberman	Chair of the Senate Homeland Security Committee; 2013–2015	Succeeded by Ron Johnson
Preceded by Tom Coburn	Ranking Member of the Senate Homeland Security Committee; 2015–2017	Succeeded by Claire McCaskill
Preceded by Barbara Boxer	Ranking Member of the Senate Environment Committee; 2017–2021	Succeeded by John Barrasso
Preceded by John Barrasso	Chair of the Senate Environment Committee; 2021–2025	Succeeded by Shelley Moore Capito
U.S. order of precedence (ceremonial)
Preceded by Kent Conrad as Former U.S. Senator	Order of precedence of the United States as Former U.S. Senator	Succeeded by Sam Nunn as Former U.S. Senator
