= 2000 United States Senate election in Maine =

- November 7, 2000
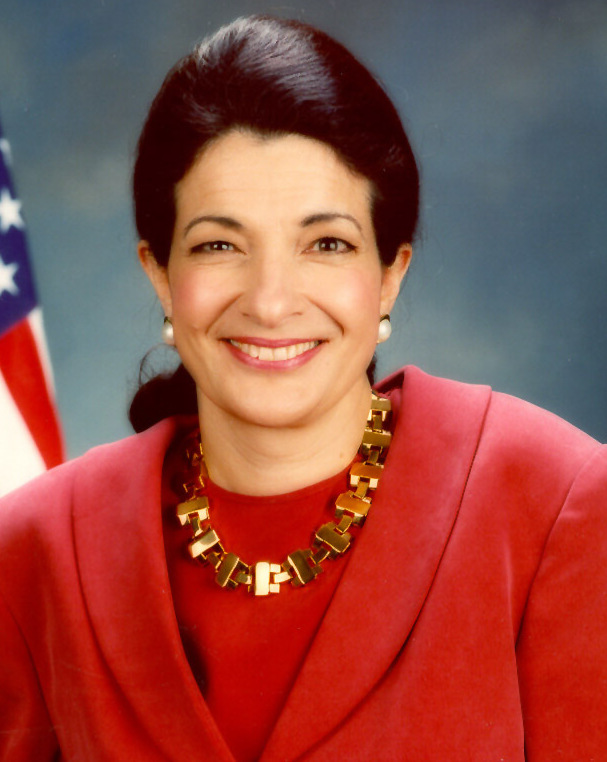

Nominee	Olympia Snowe	Mark Lawrence
Party	Republican	Democratic
Popular vote	437,689	197,183
Percentage	68.94%	31.06%
- Snowe: 50–60% 60–70% 70–80% 80–90% >90% Lawrence: 50–60%
U.S. senator before election
Olympia Snowe
Republican
Elected U.S. Senator
Olympia Snowe
Republican

The 2000 United States Senate election in Maine was held November 7, 2000. Republican incumbent Olympia Snowe was re-elected to a second term in a landslide over Democratic state senator Mark Lawrence.

== General election ==
=== Candidates ===
- Mark W. Lawrence, state senator from Kittery and former president of the Maine Senate (Democratic)
- Olympia Snowe, incumbent U.S. senator since 1995 (Republican)

=== Campaign ===
Snowe, a popular moderate incumbent, outpolled and outspent Lawrence.

=== Debates ===
The two candidates agreed to debate on October 15 and 25.

=== Polling ===
Poll source	Date(s)	Sample size	Margin of error	Olympia Snowe (R)	Mark Lawrence (D)	Other / undecided (Note: Calculated by taking the difference of 100% and all other candidates combined.)
Harris Insights & Analytics	November 3, 2000	1,473	—	70%	28%	2%
Market Decisions Research	October 24, 2000	824	—	60%	15%	25%
Pan Atlantic Research	October 22, 2000	400	—	73%	19%	8%
Rasmussen Reports	October 22, 2000	1,548	—	66%	27%	7%

=== Results ===
Snowe would defeat Lawrence in a landslide, carrying all but five municipalities in the state: Lawrence's hometown of Kittery, the heavily Democratic border towns of Madawaska and Grand Isle, and the state's two Indian reservations.

United States Senate election in Maine, 2000
Party	Candidate	Votes	%	±%
Republican	Olympia Snowe (Incumbent)	437,689	68.94%	+8.70%
Democratic	Mark W. Lawrence	197,183	31.06%	−5.30%
Majority		240,506	37.88%	+14.00%
Turnout		634,872		
Republican hold		Swing		

==== Results by county ====
County	Olympia Snowe Republican		Mark Lawrence Democratic		Margin		Total votes cast
County	#	%	#	%	#	%	Total votes cast
Androscoggin	32,483	66.8%	16,128	33.2%	16,355	33.6%	48,611
Aroostook	25,035	72.8%	9,338	27.2%	15,697	45.6%	34,373
Cumberland	95,680	68.9%	43,107	31.1%	52,573	37.8%	138,787
Franklin	10,485	69.9%	4,507	30.1%	5,978	39.8%	14,992
Hancock	19,096	69.4%	8,426	30.6%	10,670	38.8%	27,522
Kennebec	38,245	66.1%	19,610	33.9%	18,635	32.2%	57,855
Knox	14,329	72.7%	5,385	27.3%	8,944	45.4%	19,714
Lincoln	14,150	74.0%	4,976	26.0%	9,174	48.0%	19,126
Oxford	19,486	72.3%	7,478	27.7%	12,008	44.6%	26,964
Penobscot	49,428	69.2%	21,961	30.8%	27,467	38.4%	71,389
Piscataquis	6,428	71.9%	2,510	28.1%	3,918	43.8%	8,938
Sagadahoc	12,785	71.7%	5,054	28.3%	7,731	43.4%	17,839
Somerset	15,581	66.6%	7,811	33.4%	7,770	33.2%	23,392
Waldo	12,580	68.3%	5,842	31.7%	6,738	36.6%	18,422
Washington	11,073	72.9%	4,110	27.1%	6,963	45.8%	15,183
York	60,825	66.3%	30,940	33.7%	29,885	32.6%	91,765
Totals	437,689	68.9%	197,183	31.1%	240,506	37.8%	634,872

== See also ==
- 2000 United States Senate elections
