= Senate Oceans Caucus =

The Senate Oceans Caucus is a bipartisan caucus working to increase awareness and find common ground in responding to issues facing the oceans and coasts. The caucus was originally co-chaired by Senators Sheldon Whitehouse of Rhode Island and Lisa Murkowski of Alaska.

== Founding members ==
The Caucus was founded on September 17, 2011 by 18 senators of both parties. Founding members include Daniel Akaka (D-HI), Commerce Subcommittee on Oceans, Atmosphere, Fisheries, and Coast Guard Chair, Mark Begich (D-AK), Richard Blumenthal (D-CT), Committee on Environment and Public Works Chair, Barbara Boxer (D-CA), Scott Brown (R-MA), Maria Cantwell (D-WA), Environment and Public Works Subcommittee on Water and Wildlife Chair, Ben Cardin (D-MD), Tom Carper (D-DE), Chris Coons (D-DE), Lindsey Graham (R-SC), Daniel Inouye (D-HI), John Kerry (D-MA), Mary Landrieu (D-LA), Appropriations Subcommittee on Interior, Environment, and Related Agencies Ranking Minority Member, Lisa Murkowski (R-AK), Patty Murray (D-WA), Commerce Subcommittee on Oceans, Atmosphere, Fisheries, and Coast Guard Ranking Minority Member, Olympia Snowe (R-ME), Environment and Public Works Subcommittee on Oversight Chair, Sheldon Whitehouse (D-RI), and Ron Wyden (D-OR).

== Founding principles ==
The founding senators of the caucus stressed the importance of the ocean and the crucial role it plays in all aspects of life—an importance that extends not only past state but also political party lines.

Olympia Snowe, U.S. Senator of Maine, explained that, "The Senate Oceans Caucus is a major step forward in our recognition of the significant environmental and economic roles played by our oceans, and through this coordinated bipartisan effort that centralizes key priorities from all of our stakeholders and industries, our caucus has the potential to speak in a loud and unified voice on behalf of our coastal resources, yielding significant economic and environmental benefits for us all."

=== Charter ===
The Caucus established a 4-part Charter.

- Section 1- establishes the caucus, and lists the founding senators of the caucus.
- Section 2- States the mission of the caucus which is to enable further dialogue regarding coastal area and ocean policy. The section emphasizes the caucus' dedication to bipartisanship, cooperation, and education about current policy and scientific advancements.
- Section 3- lists responsibilities of caucus members to meet 4 times each session of congress, educate others on the vitality of comprehensive federal policy, work with the Oceans Subcommittee of the Senate Committee on Commerce, Science, and Transportation, and to explore, and encourage the exploration of new policies.
- Section 4- addresses the leadership structure of the caucus, focussing strongly on bipartisanship, with actions requiring support of caucus members of both parties.

== Reception ==
"This newly founded Senate Oceans Caucus is an important, bi-partisan group that will increase awareness and find common ground in responding to issues facing the oceans. The Caucus membership will work to ensure a sustainable, science-based, and efficient approach to the utilization of our ocean resources." -Consortium for Ocean Leadership

The press conference following the inaugural meeting of the caucus included representatives from ocean and coastal organizations supporting their efforts, including the Consortium for Ocean Leadership, the National Marine Manufacturers Association (NMMA), the National Ocean Industries Association (NOIA), the American Association of Port Authorities (AAPA), the National Federation of Regional Associations for Coastal and Ocean Observing (NFRA), and Ocean Champions.
