= Maine's 35th State Senate district =

American legislative district

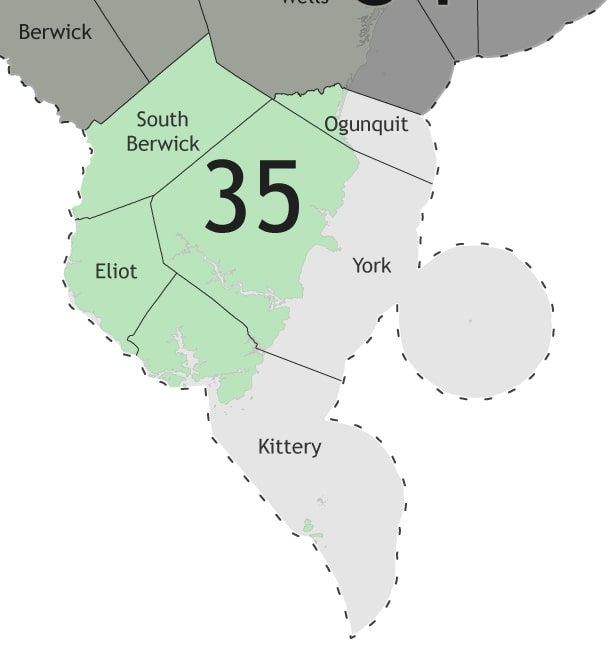
Senator
| Mark Lawrence; D–Eliot |
- Population (2020): 39,978

Maine's 35th State Senate district is one of 35 districts in the Maine Senate. It has been represented by Democrat Mark Lawrence since 2018

== Geography ==
District 35 represents the southernmost point of Maine, including a small part of the county of York.

York County - 18.9% of county

Towns:

- Eliot
- Kittery
- Ogunquit
- South Berwick
- York

== Recent election results ==
=== 2022 ===
2022 Maine State Senate election, District 35
| Party | Candidate | Votes | % |
|---|---|---|---|
| Democratic | Mark Lawrence | 13,979 | 65 |
| Republican | Julie Rakic | 7,527 | 35 |
| Total votes | | 21,506 | 100.0 |
| Democratic hold | | | |

Elections prior to 2022 were held under different district lines.

=== 2024 ===
2024 Maine State Senate election, District 35
| Party | Candidate | Votes | % |
|---|---|---|---|
| Democratic | Mark Lawrence | 16,491 | 63.6 |
| Republican | Julie Rakic | 9,453 | 36.4 |
| Total votes | | 25,944 | 100.0 |
| Democratic hold | | | |

== Historical election results ==
=== 2012 ===
2012 Maine State Senate election, District 35
| Party | Candidate | Votes | % |
|---|---|---|---|
| Democratic | Troy Jackson | 8,521 | 51.5 |
| Republican | Daniel Levesque | 8,016 | 48.5 |
| Total votes | | 16,537 | 100 |
| Democratic hold | | | |

=== 2014 ===
2014 Maine State Senate election, District 35
| Party | Candidate | Votes | % |
|---|---|---|---|
| Democratic | Dawn Hill | 10,701 | 57.7 |
| Republican | John Carson | 7,142 | 38.5 |
| Blank votes | None | 713 | 3.8 |
| Total votes | | 18,556 | 100 |
| Democratic hold | | | |

=== 2016 ===
2016 Maine State Senate election, District 35
| Party | Candidate | Votes | % |
|---|---|---|---|
| Democratic | Dawn Hill | 14,609 | 62.5 |
| Republican | Theodore Short | 9,964 | 37.5 |
| Total votes | | 24,573 | 100 |
| Democratic hold | | | |

=== 2018 ===
2018 Maine State Senate election, District 35
| Party | Candidate | Votes | % |
|---|---|---|---|
| Democratic | Mark Lawrence) | 13,408 | 62.6 |
| Republican | Michael Estes | 8,050 | 37.5 |
| Total votes | | 21,458 | 100 |
| Democratic hold | | | |

=== 2020 ===
2020 Maine State Senate election, District 35
| Party | Candidate | Votes | % |
|---|---|---|---|
| Democratic | Mark Lawrence | 17,099 | 62.6 |
| Republican | Bradley Moulton | 10,204 | 37.4 |
| Total votes | | 27,303 | 100.0 |
| Democratic hold | | | |
