= Congresstrading.com =

Financial disclosure database for the U.S. Congress

- Screenshot of the Congresstrading.com web interface in 2026.
- Website type: Financial disclosure database
- Available in: English
- Country of origin: United States
- Website: congresstrading.com
- Commercial: Yes
- Launched: October 2020
- Current status: Active
- Content license: Public financial disclosure data

Congresstrading.com is a commercial website that provides access to a database of financial disclosures of members of the United States Congress. It also provides a forum to discuss Congress' stock trades, according to WXII 12, an NBC affiliate news station. Congress is required to publicly disclose their financial transactions by the STOCK Act.

== History ==
Since its founding in October 2020, congresstrading.com has been credited by various news organizations for providing and disclosing information related to financial transactions by members of Congress. In January 2021, The New York Times reported that Speaker Nancy Pelosi purchased Tesla stock options based on information sourced from congresstrading.com. In October 2021 CNBC, CNN, and The Washington Post reported that Congresswoman Marjorie Taylor Greene bought shares of Trump SPAC Digital World Acquisition Corp. based on information provided by congresstrading.com.
