= Digital World Acquisition Corp. =

Special-purpose acquisition company

- Type: Public
- Traded as: Nasdaq: DWAC; (2021–2024)
- Industry: Special-purpose acquisition company (SPAC)
- Founded: 11 December 2020; 5 years ago
- Defunct: March 2024
- Fate: Merged with Trump Media & Technology Group
- Website: dwacspac.com

Digital World Acquisition Corp. (DWAC), founded in 2021, was an American special-purpose acquisition company (SPAC), a shell corporation listed on a stock exchange with the purpose of acquiring (or merging with) a private company, thus making the private company public without going through the initial public offering process, which often carries significant procedural and regulatory burdens. The company was led by CEO and Chairman Patrick Orlando, the founder and CEO of investment consulting and investment banking firm Benessere Capital. In October 2021, the company announced a proposed merger agreement with Trump Media & Technology Group (TMTG), the owner of Truth Social, which completed in March 2024.

== Operations ==
On September 3, 2021, DWAC commenced trading on the Nasdaq, after selling 25 million shares in its IPO.

On October 20, 2021, DWAC and Trump Media & Technology Group (TMTG) announced that they had entered into a definitive merger agreement that would combine the two entities, allowing TMTG to become a publicly traded company. DWAC was created with the help of ARC Capital, a Shanghai-based firm specializing in listing Chinese companies on American stock markets that has been a target of U.S. Securities and Exchange Commission (SEC) investigations for misrepresenting shell corporations. Some investors were surprised to learn that their investment money was being used to finance a Trump company. In 2021, the DWAC Trump venture was linked with another company, China Yunhong Holdings, based in Wuhan, Hubei, until its lead banker who was running the merger promised to sever ties with China in December 2021, stating that Yunhong was to "dissolve and liquidate". In February 2022, Reuters reported that the connection between Shanghai-based ARC Capital and Digital World was more extensive than thought, with ARC having offered money to get the SPAC off the ground.

In August 2022, DWAC secured shareholder approval for four three-month extensions to close the deal, deferring shareholder meetings until September 8, 2023. The firm needed to close the deal by that date, or have 65% of shareholders approve another extension, or face liquidation. Shareholders approved a one-year extension on September 5.

In March 2023, Digital World Acquisition fired its CEO Patrick Orlando.

DWAC disclosed in an October 2023 regulatory filing that after investors had canceled $467 million of their commitments, the firm would return the remaining $533 million of the $1 billion it had raised.

On March 22, 2024, DWAC shareholders approved a deal to merge with TMTG. Following the vote, the share price closed the day at $36.94 following an open value of $43.92 and a high of $46.70, just prior to the vote.

== Investigation of illegal trading ==
On June 29, 2023, three people were arrested on charges that they had illegally traded DWAC based on nonpublic knowledge before the proposed merger was announced in 2021.

The founder of the DWAC SPAC, Miami banker Patrick Orlando, had been discussing the deal with Trump since at least March 2021, as The New York Times reported days after the TMTG deal was announced. This may have skirted securities laws and stock exchange rules, since SPACs are not allowed to have a target company in mind prior to going public. The formation of the SPAC was announced in May 2021 and it was taken public that September. By mid-2021, people affiliated with TMTG were telling Wall Street investors that the company was nearing a deal to merge with a SPAC. Trump and Orlando had initially discussed a deal through another of Orlando's SPACs that was already publicly traded, but it was deemed too small for the Trump deal. Deal discussions could have been proper when the first SPAC was being considered but improper after the SPAC was formed. DWAC stated in three prospectuses that it had not had "any substantive discussions, directly or indirectly, with any business combination target."

Orlando's stake in DWAC increased by $420 million from the original $3 million he invested.

In late 2021, the SEC and the Financial Industry Regulatory Authority asked DWAC for information about stock trading and communications with TMTG prior to their deal being announced. (DWAC disclosed this request in a December 2021 regulatory filing.) The company disclosed in June 2022 that the SEC was expanding its inquiry, and days later said a grand jury seated by the U.S. Attorney for the Southern District of New York (SDNY) had subpoenaed DWAC and each member of its board, as well as documents.

On July 3, 2023, DWAC announced its intent to settle by paying an $18 million fine to the SEC and revising some of its filings. On July 20, the SEC announced the settlement.

== Notable stockholders ==
In October 2021 it was reported, based on information provided by congresstrading.com, that House representative Marjorie Taylor Greene (R-GA) had purchased between $15,000 and $50,000 DWAC shares after the Trump merger was announced.
