= Kenneth F. Lemont =

American politician (born 1951)

Member of the Maine Senate
- In office 2000–2004
- Succeeded by: Mary Andrews

Member of the Maine House of Representatives
- In office 1992–2000

Personal details
- Born: June 21, 1951 (age 75) Waltham, Massachusetts, U.S.
- Party: Republican
- Spouse: Gail
- Children: 2
- Education: Bentley College (BS)
- Occupation: Politician, businessman

Kenneth F. Lemont (born June 21, 1951) is an American politician from Maine. A Republican from Kittery, Maine, Lemont served in the Maine House of Representatives from 1992 to 2000. Unable to seek re-election in 2000 to the House due to term limits, Lemont was elected to the Maine Senate over Democrat Catherine Woodard of South Berwick.

Re-elected in 2002 against Democrat Larry Deater of Kittery, Lemont did not seek re-election in 2004 and was replaced by fellow Republican Mary Andrews.

Lemont graduated from Bentley College in 1973 with a Bachelor of Science degree. He and his wife Gail have two sons.
