= Mary Andrews (politician) =

American politician

Mary Black Andrews

Member of the Maine Senate from the 1st district
- In office 2004–2006
- Preceded by: Kenneth F. Lemont
- Succeeded by: Peter Bowman

Personal details
- Party: Republican

Mary Black Andrews is an American politician from Maine. Andrews served as a Republican State Senator from Maine's 1st District, representing part of York County, including her residence in York. She had previously been elected to three consecutive two-year terms in the Maine House of Representatives (1998–2004). She did not seek re-election following her first term in the Senate and was replaced by Peter Bowman (D-Kittery).

While in the Maine Legislature, Andrews was a vocal opponent of Maine's tax on gasoline and diesel.

After leaving the Senate, Andrews was elected to the York Board of Selectmen. In May 2014, she was elected chairperson.
