= Thomas B. Evans Jr. =

American politician (born 1931)

Tom Evans
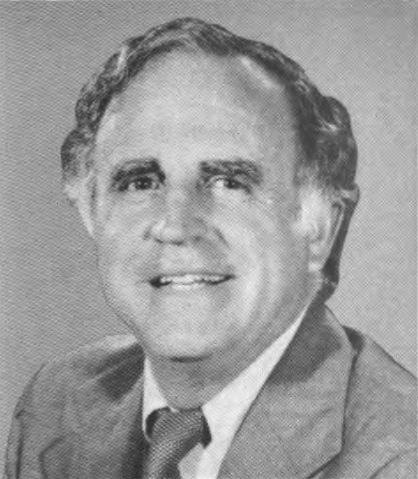
- Evans in 1981

Member of the U.S. House of Representatives from Delaware's at-large district
- In office January 3, 1977 – January 3, 1983
- Preceded by: Pete du Pont
- Succeeded by: Tom Carper

Personal details
- Born: Thomas Beverley Evans Jr. November 5, 1931 (age 94) Nashville, Tennessee, U.S.
- Party: Republican
- Spouse: Mary Page
- Education: University of Virginia (BA, LLB)

Thomas Beverley Evans Jr. (born November 5, 1931) is an American lawyer and politician from Delaware. A member of the Republican Party, he served as a member of the United States House of Representatives for three terms from 1977 to 1983.

== Early life and family ==
Evans was born in Nashville, Tennessee, attended the public schools of Old Hickory, Tennessee, and Seaford, Delaware, and graduated from Woodberry Forest School in Orange, Virginia, in 1947. He then graduated from the University of Virginia in 1953, where he was a member of Delta Phi and the University of Virginia Law School in 1956.

== Professional career ==
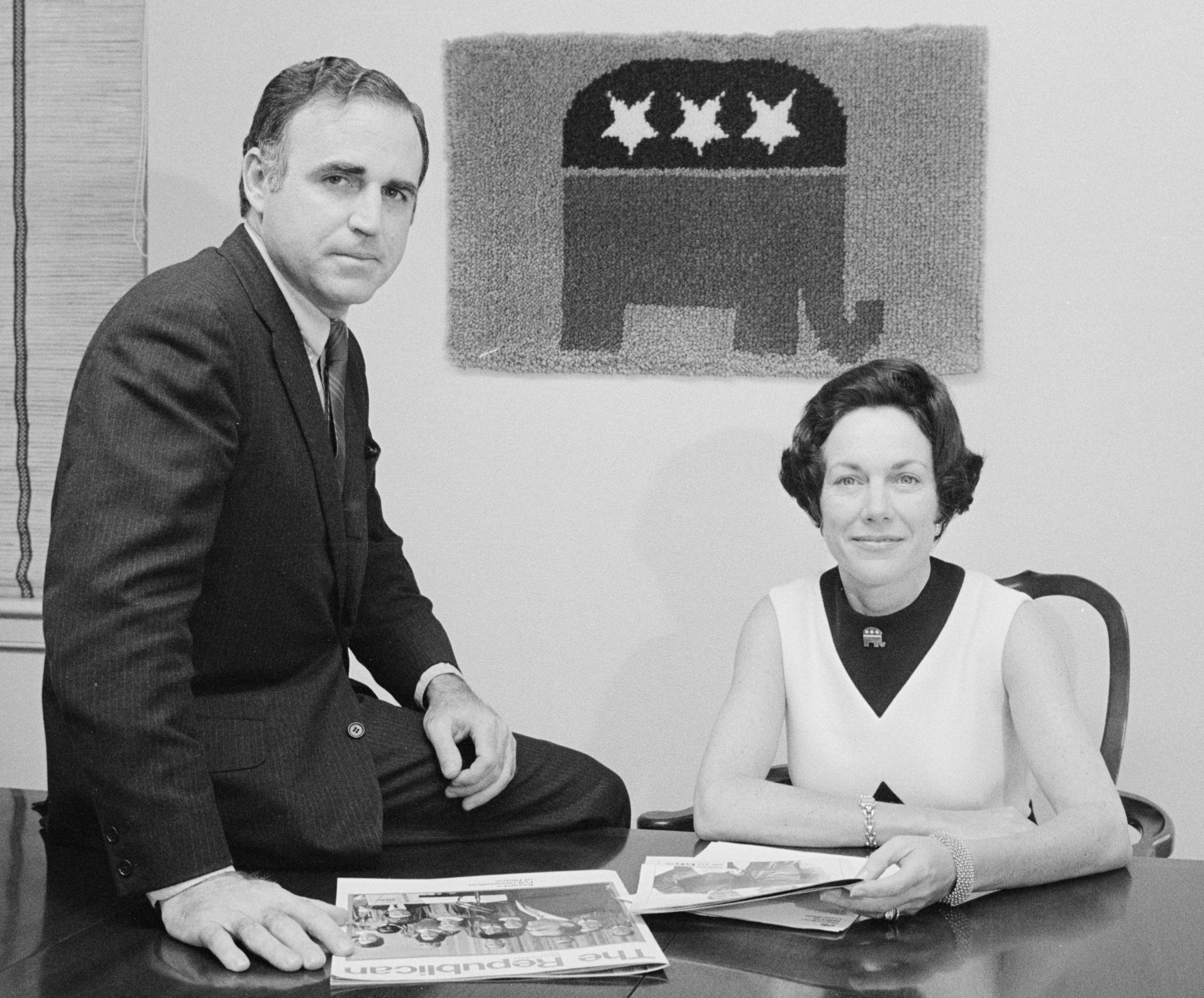
Evans with Ann Armstrong at the Republican National Committee headquarters in 1971

Evans was admitted to the Virginia Bar in 1956, then engaged in the insurance and mortgage brokerage business in Wilmington, Delaware, from 1957 until 1968. He served in the Delaware National Guard from 1956 until 1960, as clerk to the Chief Justice of Delaware Supreme Court in 1955, as director of the Delaware State Development Department from 1969 until 1970, and co-chairman and chief operating officer of the Republican National Committee from 1971 until 1973.

He was a member of law firm of Manatt, Phelps & Phillips in Washington, D.C. He also served as Chairman of the Florida Coalition for Preservation, a not-for-profit organization formed in April 2007 to promote responsible growth and protect coastal barrier islands through the education of the public and other concerned groups. Currently, Evans is a member of the ReFormers Caucus of Issue One.

== United States Representative ==
Evans was first elected to the U.S. House of Representatives in 1976, defeating Democrat Samuel L. Shipley. He won election three times in all, also defeating Democrats Gary E. Hindes in 1978 and Robert L. Maxwell in 1980. During these three terms, he served in the Republican minority in the 95th, 96th and 97th Congress. He came to the United States Congress already a friend of United States Senate member Bob Dole, and later became a friend of President of the United States Ronald Reagan. He served on the United States House Committee on Financial Services and the United States House Committee on Transportation and Infrastructure. Passionate about the environment, Evans co-authored the Coastal Barrier Resources Act and the Alaska Wilderness Preservation Act. He also co-authored the Evans-Tsongas Act. In 2016, the National Wildlife Federation gave Evans a Conservation Leadership Award for these achievements.

Evans was involved in a scandal involving lobbyist and former nude model Paula Parkinson, in which allegations were made that she traded sex for political influence. The United States Department of Justice investigated the allegations and found no evidence of any crimes. Evans was defeated in his attempt at a fourth term in 1982. In all, Evans served from January 3, 1977, until January 3, 1983, during the administrations of U.S. presidents Jimmy Carter and Ronald Reagan.

== Almanac ==
Elections are held the first Tuesday after November 1. U.S. Representatives take office January 3 and have a two-year term.

Public offices
Office	Type	Location	Began office	Ended office	Notes
U.S. Representative	Legislature	Washington	January 3, 1977	January 3, 1979	
U.S. Representative	Legislature	Washington	January 3, 1979	January 3, 1981	
U.S. Representative	Legislature	Washington	January 3, 1981	January 3, 1983	

United States congressional service
Dates	Congress	Chamber	Majority	President	Committees	Class/District
1977–1979	95th	U.S. House	Democratic	Jimmy Carter		at-large
1979–1981	96th	U.S. House	Democratic	Jimmy Carter		at-large
1981–1983	97th	U.S. House	Democratic	Ronald Reagan		at-large

Election results
Year	Office	Election	Subject	Party	Votes	%	Opponent	Party	Votes	%
1976	U.S. Representative	General	Thomas B. Evans Jr.	Republican	110,677	51%	Sam Shipley	Democratic	102,431	48%
1978	U.S. Representative	General	Thomas B. Evans Jr.	Republican	91,689	59%	Gary Hindes	Democratic	64,863	41%
1980	U.S. Representative	General	Thomas B. Evans Jr.	Republican	133,842	62%	Bob Maxwell	Democratic	81,227	38%
1982	U.S. Representative	General	Thomas B. Evans Jr.	Republican	87,153	46%	Tom Carper	Democratic	98,533	52%

== See also ==
- List of federal political sex scandals in the United States

U.S. House of Representatives
Preceded by Pete du Pont	Member of the U.S. House of Representatives from Delaware's at-large congressional district 1977–1983	Succeeded by Tom Carper
U.S. order of precedence (ceremonial)
Preceded by Tulsi Gabbard as Former U.S. Representative	Order of precedence of the United States as Former U.S. Representative	Succeeded by Paul McHale as Former U.S. Representative
