= 2006 United States House of Representatives elections in New Hampshire =

- November 7, 2006

All 2 New Hampshire seats to the United States House of Representatives
	Majority party	Minority party
Party	Democratic	Republican
Last election	0	2
Seats won	2	0
Seat change	▲2	▼2
Popular vote	209,434	189,615
Percentage	52.01%	47.09%
Swing	▲14.64%	▼13.69%

Democratic
40–50%
50–60%
60–70%
70–80%
90–100%
Republican
40–50%
50–60%
60–70%
Tie
50%

The 2006 House of Representatives elections in New Hampshire took place on November 7, 2006, to determine who would represent the state of New Hampshire in the United States House of Representatives during the 110th Congress from January 3, 2007, until January 3, 2009.

New Hampshire had historically been a stronghold of the Republican Party. Both congressional seats were held by Republicans going into the election, in addition to most state and local offices. However, New Hampshire gave its four electoral votes to John Kerry in 2004 and to Bill Clinton in 1992 and 1996. Democratic governor John Lynch, who defeated incumbent Republican governor Craig Benson in 2004, was widely popular, and defeated his Republican opponent, Jim Coburn, in the simultaneous 2006 gubernatorial election. As a result, New Hampshire is commonly classified by the media as a tossup or battleground state in many federal elections.

In this particular election, Democrats were not initially expected to unseat either of the Republican incumbents, Jeb Bradley (NH-1) and Charlie Bass (NH-2). However, first district Democratic candidate Carol Shea-Porter and second district Democratic candidate Paul Hodes raised significant funds and ran more aggressive campaigns than Democrats had in years past. In a surprising upset, both Bass and Bradley were unseated by Hodes and Shea-Porter respectively on election day. This was the first time Democrats had held both New Hampshire House seats since 1915.

== Overview ==
United States House of Representatives elections in New Hampshire, 2006
Party	Votes	Percentage	Seats	+/–
Democratic	209,434	52.01%	2	+2
Republican	189,615	47.09%	0	-2
Libertarian	3,305	0.82%	0	-
Others	315	0.08%	0	-
Totals	402,669	100.00%	2	-

== District 1 ==
2006 New Hampshire's 1st congressional district election
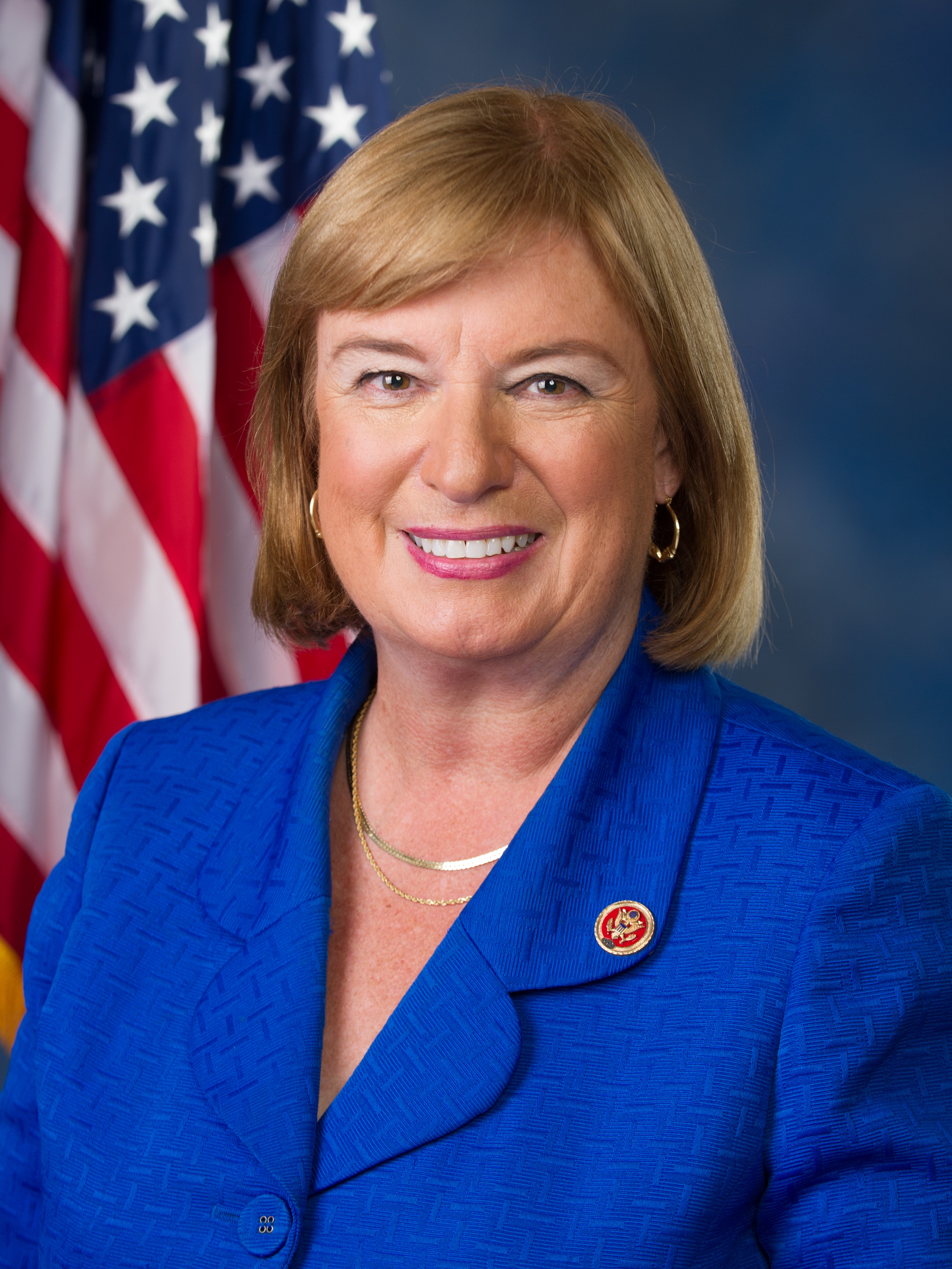

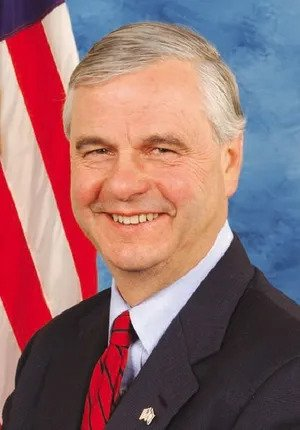
Nominee	Carol Shea-Porter	Jeb Bradley
Party	Democratic	Republican
Popular vote	100,691	95,527
Percentage	51.3%	48.6%
- County results Shea-Porter: 50–60% Bradley: 50–60%
U.S. Representative before election
Jeb Bradley
Republican
Elected U.S. Representative
Carol Shea-Porter
Democratic

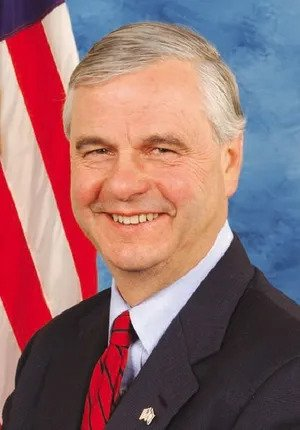
Defeated Republican incumbent Jeb Bradley.

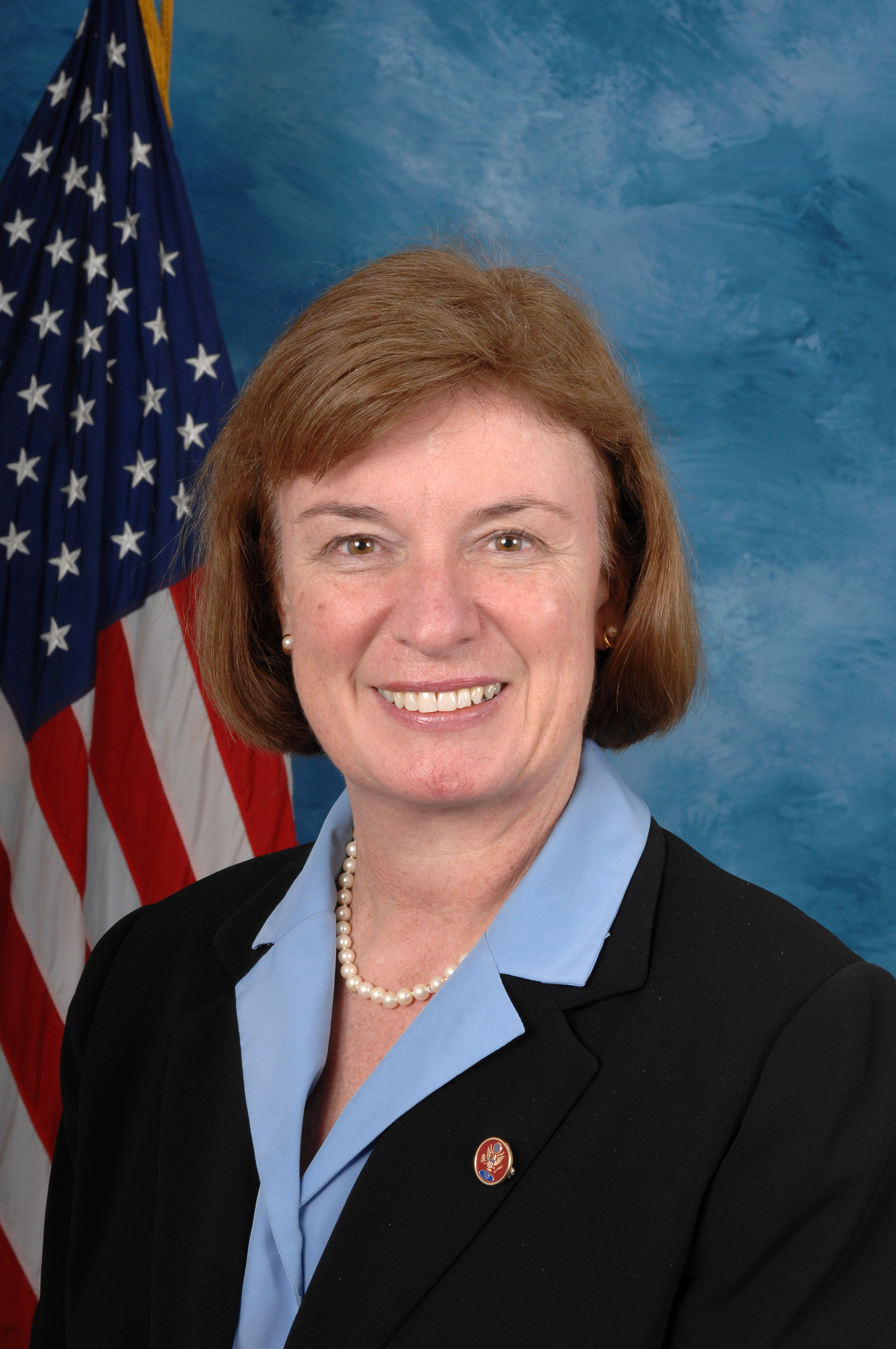
Democratic Candidate Carol Shea-Porter.

Incumbent Jeb Bradley won reelection in 2004 with 63% of the vote. Bradley was a fiscal conservative who supported reductions in taxes and spending. In 2004, this was the only congressional district in New England that President Bush carried.

In a surprise upset victory in the Democratic primary, Rochester Democratic chair Carol Shea-Porter defeated the better funded and party-favored state House Democratic Leader Jim Craig, getting 54% of the vote to Craig's 34%. Shea-Porter supported a single-payer healthcare program and increased federal funding for education. Unlike her opponent, she disagreed with President Bush on foreign policy issues and the War in Iraq.

Polls conducted over the course of the campaign showed Bradley in mid-September holding a 25% lead over Shea-Porter. The trend over the next six weeks, however, showed that lead shrinking. Just prior to election day Bradley was favored over Shea-Porter by just 5%, within the 5% margin of error.

Despite those polling trends, and the shift toward Democratic candidates seen nationwide in 2006, Shea-Porter's victory over Bradley was described by many as "surprising" and an "upset." When the votes were counted, Shea-Porter was declared victorious with 51% of the vote to Bradley's 49%.

=== Candidates ===
- Republican: Jeb Bradley - Incumbent
- Democratic: Carol Shea-Porter
- Libertarian: Dan Belforti

=== Endorsements ===
Carol Shea-Porter (D)

Individuals

- Wesley Clark, General, 2004 democratic presidential candidate

==== Predictions ====
Source	Ranking	As of
The Cook Political Report	Likely R	November 6, 2006
Rothenberg	Safe R	November 6, 2006
Sabato's Crystal Ball	Likely R	November 6, 2006
Real Clear Politics	Safe R	November 7, 2006
CQ Politics	Likely R	November 7, 2006

=== Results ===
New Hampshire congressional elections, District 1
Party	Candidate	Votes	%	±%
Democratic	Carol Shea-Porter	100,691	51.27%	
Republican	Jeb Bradley (incumbent)	95,527	48.64%	
Other	N/A	159	0.08%	
Democratic gain from Republican		Swing		

== District 2 ==
2006 New Hampshire's 2nd congressional district election
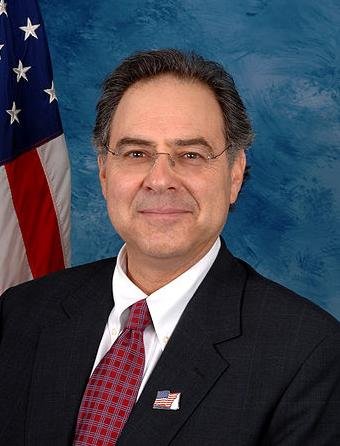

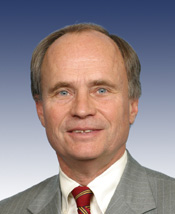
Nominee	Paul Hodes	Charles Bass
Party	Democratic	Republican
Popular vote	108,743	94,088
Percentage	52.7%	45.6%
- Municipality results Hodes: 40–50% 50–60% 60–70% 70–80% >90% Bass: 40–50% 50–60% 60–70% No Votes
U.S. Representative before election
Charles Bass
Republican
Elected U.S. Representative
Paul Hodes
Democratic

Incumbent Charles Bass (R) won reelection in 2004 with 58% percent of the vote, even as his district was won by John Kerry 52% to 47%. Bass was, like his colleague Bradley, a self-described political moderate and fiscal conservative. Bass also embraced environmentalism and pro-choice politics.

Bass easily defeated primary challenges from Berlin Mayor Bob Danderson and 9/11 critic and constitutionalist Mary Maxwell. The Democratic nominee was 2004 challenger Paul Hodes, an attorney. Hodes is a strong critic of the Bush administration, supporting issues such as universal healthcare, deficit reduction, raising the minimum wage, and an immediate withdrawal of National Guard and Reserve troops from Iraq.

In late September, a top Bass staffer resigned after news broke that a US Government computer from Bass's DC office had been posting anonymous concern troll messages to NH blogs. In these messages, "IndyNH" claimed to be a supporter of Paul Hodes who was discouraged by Bass's unbeatable lead and urged other Hodes supporters to turn their efforts to other, more winnable races.

The Bass-Hodes matchup was considered more competitive than that of Bradley and Shea-Porter, since voters in the 2nd district had sided with the Republican Party less consistently in recent years. Additionally, Hodes raised more campaign funds than the incumbent. Therefore, the 2006 election was expected to be a great deal closer than Bass's easy win in 2004. Initially, Bass maintained early leads over Hodes in most non-partisan polls, ranging from just 7-points in one poll to 27-points in another. However, as the election drew nearer, polls indicated either a slight Hodes lead or a tossup.

Just before election day, Hodes pulled in front of Bass in several polls. On election day at 10:30pm, Charlie Bass conceded defeat to Paul Hodes, who garnered 53% of the vote as opposed to 45% for Bass. Bass later reclaimed this seat in 2010 and lost re-election again in 2012.

=== Candidates ===
- Republican: Charlie Bass - Incumbent
- Democratic: Paul Hodes
- Libertarian: Ken Blevens

=== Endorsements ===
Paul Hodes (D)

Individuals

- Wesley Clark, General, 2004 democratic presidential candidate

==== Predictions ====
Source	Ranking	As of
The Cook Political Report	Tossup	November 6, 2006
Rothenberg	Tilt D (flip)	November 6, 2006
Sabato's Crystal Ball	Tilt D (flip)	November 6, 2006
Real Clear Politics	Tossup	November 7, 2006
CQ Politics	Tossup	November 7, 2006

=== Results ===
New Hampshire congressional elections, District 2
Party	Candidate	Votes	%	±%
Democratic	Paul Hodes	108,743	52.71%	
Republican	Charlie Bass (incumbent)	94,088	45.61%	
Libertarian	Ken Blevens	3,305	1.60%	
Other	N/A	156	0.08%	
Democratic gain from Republican		Swing		
