= 2004 United States gubernatorial elections =

- November 2, 2004

13 governorships 11 states; 2 territories
	Majority party	Minority party
Party	Republican	Democratic
Seats before	28	22
Seats after	28	22
Seat change	Steady	Steady
Popular vote	7,438,550	7,534,041
Percentage	48.85%	49.48%
Seats up	5	6
Seats won	5	6
- Map of the results Republican hold Republican gain Democratic hold Democratic gain Popular Democratic hold Nonpartisan; No election

United States gubernatorial elections were held on November 2, 2004, in 11 states and two territories. There was no net gain in seats for either party, as Democrats picked up an open seat in Montana while defeating incumbent Craig Benson in New Hampshire, while Republicans defeated incumbent Joe Kernan in Indiana and won Missouri after Bob Holden lost in the primary. These elections coincided with the presidential election.

As of 2026, this is the last time that multiple state governors lost renomination.

== Election predictions ==
State	Incumbent	Last race	Sabato November 3, 2008	Result
Delaware	Ruth Ann Minner	59.24% D	Likely D	Minner; 50.87% D
Indiana	Joe Kernan	56.56% D	Likely R (flip)	Daniels; 53.21% R (flip)
Missouri	Bob Holden (lost renomination)	49.12% D	Lean R (flip)	Blunt; 50.83% R (flip)
Montana	Judy Martz (retired)	50.98% R	Lean D (flip)	Schweitzer; 50.44% D (flip)
New Hampshire	Craig Benson	58.62% R	Lean R	Lynch; 51.07% D (flip)
North Carolina	Mike Easley	52.02% D	Likely D	Easley; 55.62% D
North Dakota	John Hoeven	55.03% R	Safe R	Hoeven; 71.26% R
Utah	Olene Walker (retired)	55.77% R	Lean R	Huntsman Jr. 57.74% R
Vermont	Jim Douglas	44.94% R	Likely R	Douglas; 58.70% R
Washington	Gary Locke (retired)	58.38% D	Lean R (flip)	Gregoire; 48.87% D
West Virginia	Bob Wise (retired)	50.12% D	Safe D	Manchin; 63.51% D

== Race summary ==
=== States ===
State	Incumbent	Party	First elected	Result	Candidates
Delaware	Ruth Ann Minner	Democratic	2000	Incumbent re-elected.	▌ ✓ Ruth Ann Minner (Democratic) 50.9%; ▌Bill Lee (Republican) 45.8%; ▌Frank Infante (Independent) 2.9%
Indiana	Joe Kernan	Democratic	2003 (Note: Kernan took office after his predecessor (Frank O'Bannon) died.)	Incumbent lost election to full term. New governor elected. Republican gain.	▌ ✓ Mitch Daniels (Republican) 53.2%; ▌Joe Kernan (Democratic) 45.5%; ▌Kenn Gividen (Libertarian) 1.3%
Missouri	Bob Holden	Democratic	2000	Incumbent lost re-nomination. New governor elected. Republican gain.	▌ ✓ Matt Blunt (Republican) 50.8%; ▌Claire McCaskill (Democratic) 47.8%
Montana	Judy Martz	Republican	2000	Incumbent retired. New governor elected. Democratic gain.	▌ ✓ Brian Schweitzer (Democratic) 50.4%; ▌Bob Brown (Republican) 46.0%; ▌Bob Kelleher (Green) 1.9%; ▌Stan Jones (Libertarian) 1.7%
New Hampshire	Craig Benson	Republican	2002	Incumbent lost re-election. New governor elected. Democratic gain.	▌ ✓ John Lynch (Democratic) 51.0%; ▌Craig Benson (Republican) 48.9%
North Carolina	Mike Easley	Democratic	2000	Incumbent re-elected.	▌ ✓ Mike Easley (Democratic) 55.6%; ▌Patrick J. Ballantine (Republican) 42.9%; ▌Barbara Howe (Libertarian) 1.5%
North Dakota	John Hoeven	Republican	2000	Incumbent re-elected.	▌ ✓ John Hoeven (Republican) 71.3%; ▌Joe Satrom (Democratic) 27.4%; ▌Roland Riemers (Libertarian) 1.3%
Utah	Olene Walker	Republican	2003 (Note: Walker took office after her predecessor (Mike Leavitt) resigned.)	Incumbent lost nomination to full term. New governor elected. Republican hold.	▌ ✓ Jon Huntsman Jr. (Republican) 57.7%; ▌Scott Matheson Jr. (Democratic) 41.3%
Vermont	Jim Douglas	Republican	2002	Incumbent re-elected.	▌ ✓ Jim Douglas (Republican) 58.7%; ▌Peter Clavelle (Democratic) 37.9%; ▌Cris Ericson (Marijuana) 1.4%
Washington	Gary Locke	Democratic	1996	Incumbent retired. New governor elected. Democratic hold.	▌ ✓ Christine Gregoire (Democratic) 48.9%; ▌Dino Rossi (Republican) 48.9%; ▌Ruth Bennett (Libertarian) 2.3%
West Virginia	Bob Wise	Democratic	2000	Incumbent retired. New governor elected. Democratic hold.	▌ ✓ Joe Manchin (Democratic) 63.5%; ▌Monty Warner (Republican) 34.0%; ▌Jesse Johnson (Mountain) 2.5%

=== Territories ===
Territory	Incumbent	Party	First elected	Result	Candidates
American Samoa	Togiola Tulafono	Democratic	2003 (Note: Tulafono took office after his predecessor (Tauese Sunia) died.)	Incumbent elected to full term.	▌ ✓ Togiola Tulafono (Democratic) 55.7%; ▌Afoa L.S. Lutu (Independent) 44.3%
Puerto Rico	Sila Calderón	Popular Democratic	2000	Incumbent retired. New governor elected. Popular Democratic hold.	▌ ✓ Aníbal Acevedo Vilá (PPD) 48.4%; ▌Pedro Rosselló (PNP) 48.2%; ▌Rubén Berríos (PIP) 2.7%

== Closest races ==
States where the margin of victory was under 1%:

1. Washington, 0.005%
2. Puerto Rico, 0.2%

States where the margin of victory was under 5%:

1. New Hampshire, 2.1%
2. Missouri, 3.0%
3. Montana, 4.4%

States where the margin of victory was under 10%:

1. Delaware, 5.1%
2. Indiana, 7.7%

== Delaware ==
2004 Delaware gubernatorial election
- November 2, 2004
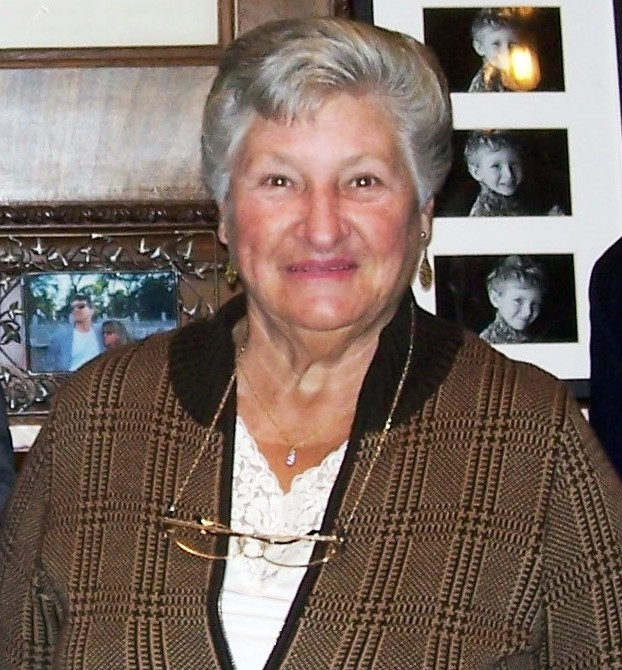

Nominee	Ruth Ann Minner	Bill Lee
Party	Democratic	Republican
Popular vote	185,548	167,008
Percentage	50.9%	45.8%
- County results Minner: 50–60% Lee: 50–60%
Governor before election
Ruth Ann Minner
Democratic
Elected Governor
Ruth Ann Minner
Democratic

The 2004 Delaware gubernatorial election was held on November 2, 2004, coinciding with the U.S. presidential election. Incumbent governor Ruth Ann Minner faced a serious challenge from retired Superior Court Judge Bill Lee, but managed a five-point victory on election day. As of 2022, this was the last time Kent County voted for the Republican candidate in a gubernatorial election or that the statewide margin was within single digits.

== Indiana ==
2004 Indiana gubernatorial election
- November 2, 2004
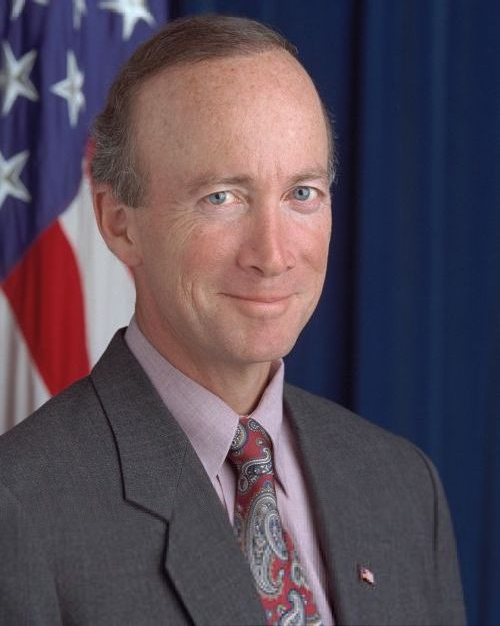

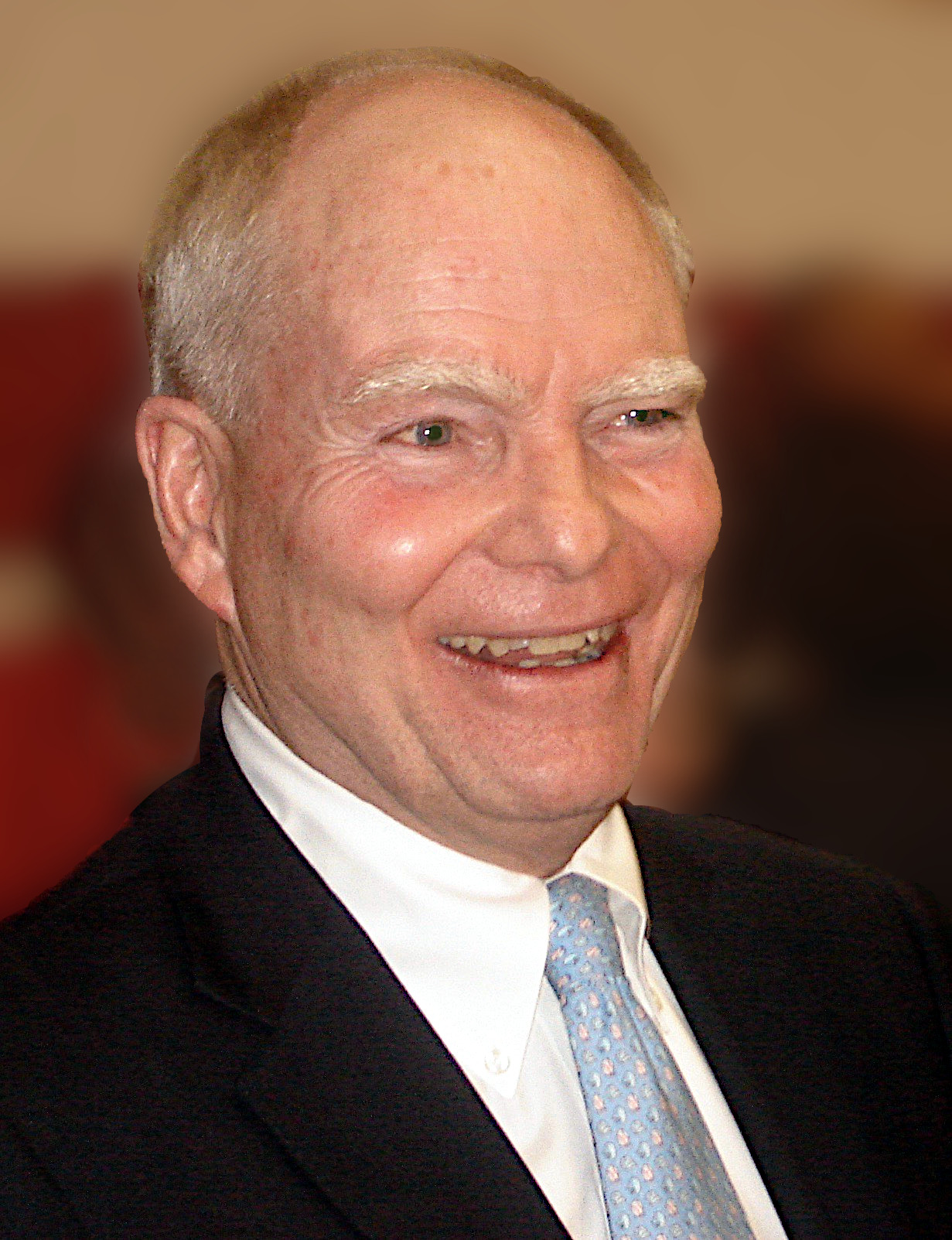
Nominee	Mitch Daniels	Joe Kernan
Party	Republican	Democratic
Running mate	Becky Skillman	Kathy Davis
Popular vote	1,302,912	1,113,900
Percentage	53.2%	45.5%
- County results Daniels: 50–60% 60–70% 70–80% Kernan: 40–50% 50–60% 60–70% Tie: 40–50%
Governor before election
Joe Kernan
Democratic
Elected Governor
Mitch Daniels
Republican

The 2004 Indiana gubernatorial election took place on November 2, 2004, to elect the governor of Indiana.

Incumbent Democratic governor Joe Kernan was defeated by Republican Mitch Daniels. Daniels' victory was the first time the Republican Party had been elected governor since 1984, and gave the party control of all the important statewide offices. It was also the first time an incumbent governor had been defeated since the Constitution of Indiana was amended in 1972 to permit governors to serve two consecutive terms.

== Missouri ==
2004 Missouri gubernatorial election
- November 2, 2004
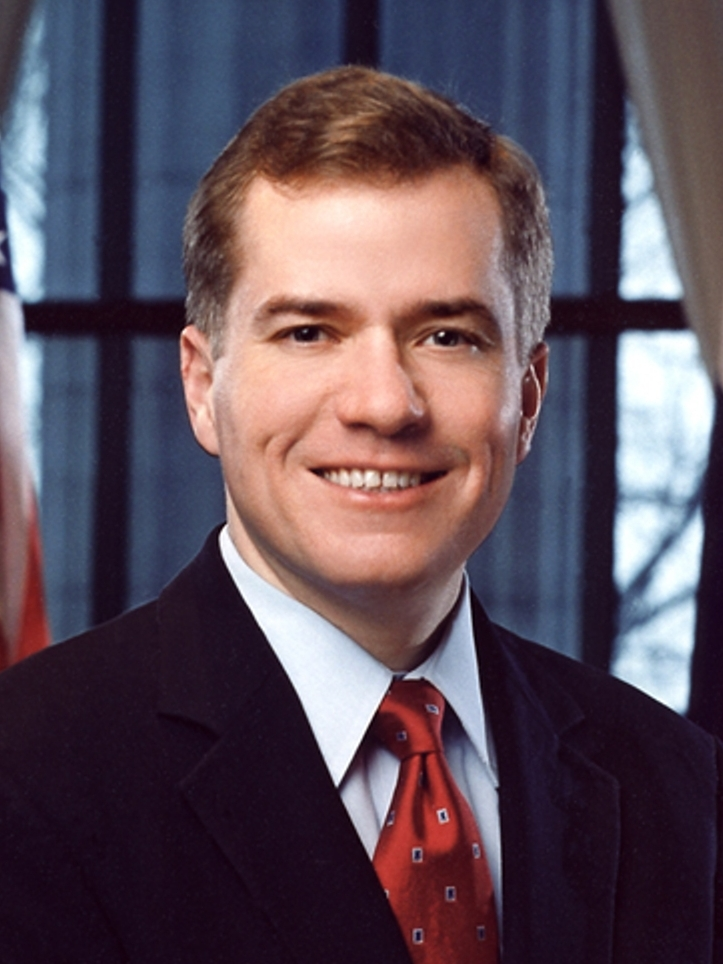

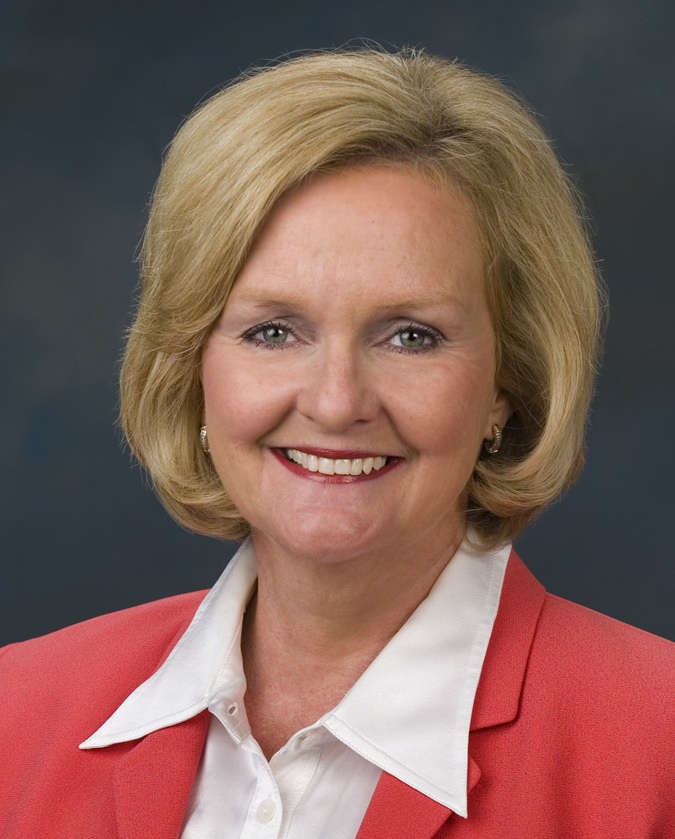
Nominee	Matt Blunt	Claire McCaskill
Party	Republican	Democratic
Popular vote	1,382,419	1,301,442
Percentage	50.8%	47.9%
- County results Blunt: 50–60% 60–70% 70–80% McCaskill: 40–50% 50–60% 60–70% 70–80%
Governor before election
Bob Holden
Democratic
Elected Governor
Matt Blunt
Republican

The 2004 Missouri gubernatorial election was held on November 2, 2004 for the post of Governor of Missouri. The Republican nominee, Missouri Secretary of State Matt Blunt, defeated Democratic State Auditor Claire McCaskill. This gave the Republican Party control of both the governorship and the Missouri General Assembly for the first time in 80 years.

McCaskill had earlier defeated incumbent Governor Bob Holden in the Democratic primary. This was the first time a sitting governor of Missouri had been defeated in a primary and the first time any United States governor had lost in a primary since the 1994 elections.

Coincidentally, McCaskill's mother, Betty Anne, had previously been defeated by Blunt's grandfather, Leroy Blunt, in a 1978 General Assembly election. Blunt's father, Roy Blunt, was a congressman and served with McCaskill in the U.S. Senate from 2011 to 2019.

== Montana ==
2004 Montana gubernatorial election
- November 2, 2004
- Turnout: 71.4%▲11.5
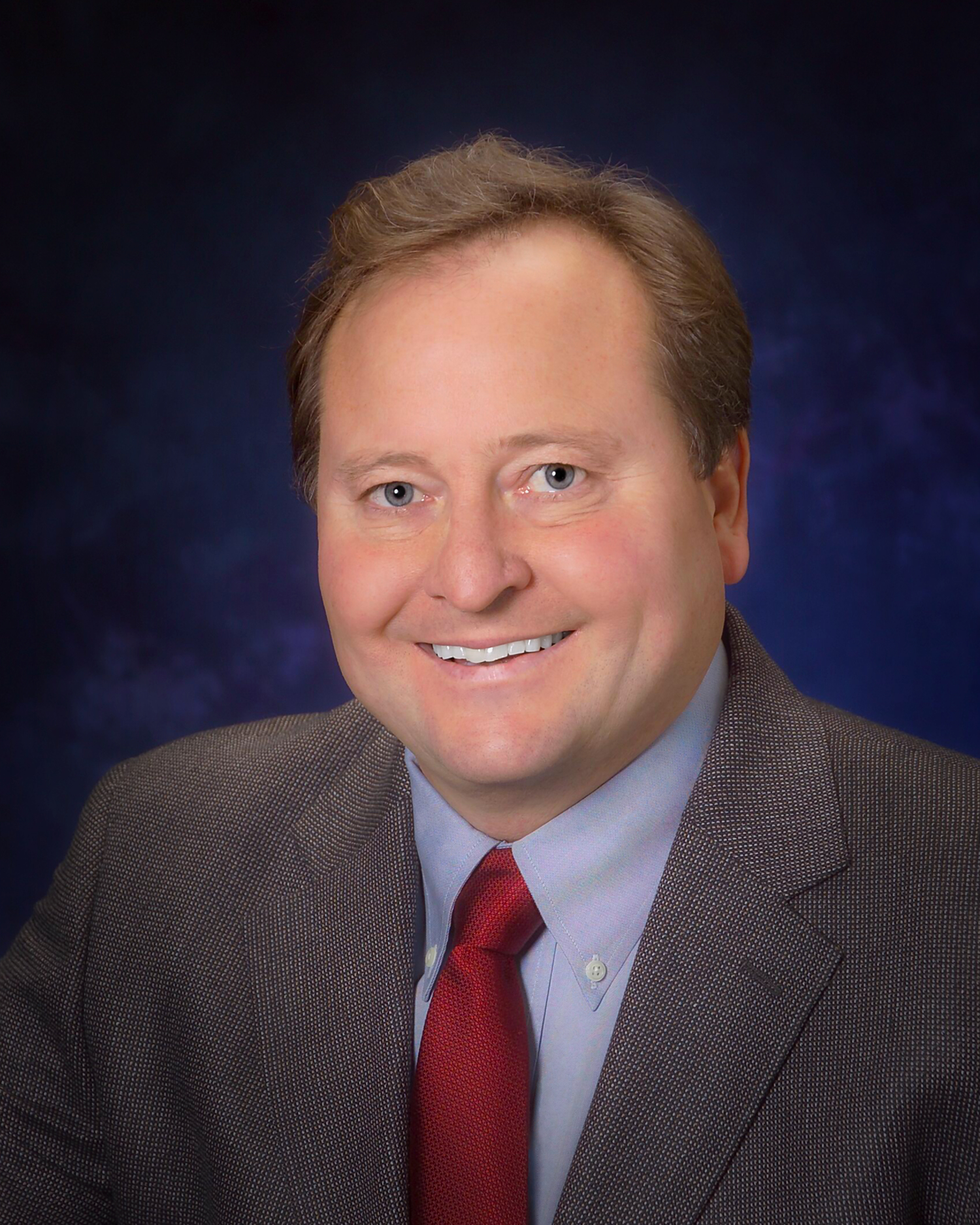

Nominee	Brian Schweitzer	Bob Brown
Party	Democratic	Republican
Running mate	John Bohlinger	Dave Lewis
Popular vote	225,016	205,313
Percentage	50.4%	46.0%
- County results Schweitzer: 40–50% 50–60% 60–70% 70–80% Brown: 40–50% 50–60% 60–70% 70–80%
Governor before election
Judy Martz
Republican
Elected Governor
Brian Schweitzer
Democratic

The 2004 Montana gubernatorial election took place on November 2, 2004 for the post of Governor of Montana. Democrat Brian Schweitzer defeated Montana Secretary of State and Republican nominee Bob Brown with 50.4% of the vote against 46%. Schweitzer formed a ticket with a Republican running mate, choosing state legislator John Bohlinger for the lieutenant governorship.

== New Hampshire ==
2004 New Hampshire gubernatorial election
- November 2, 2004
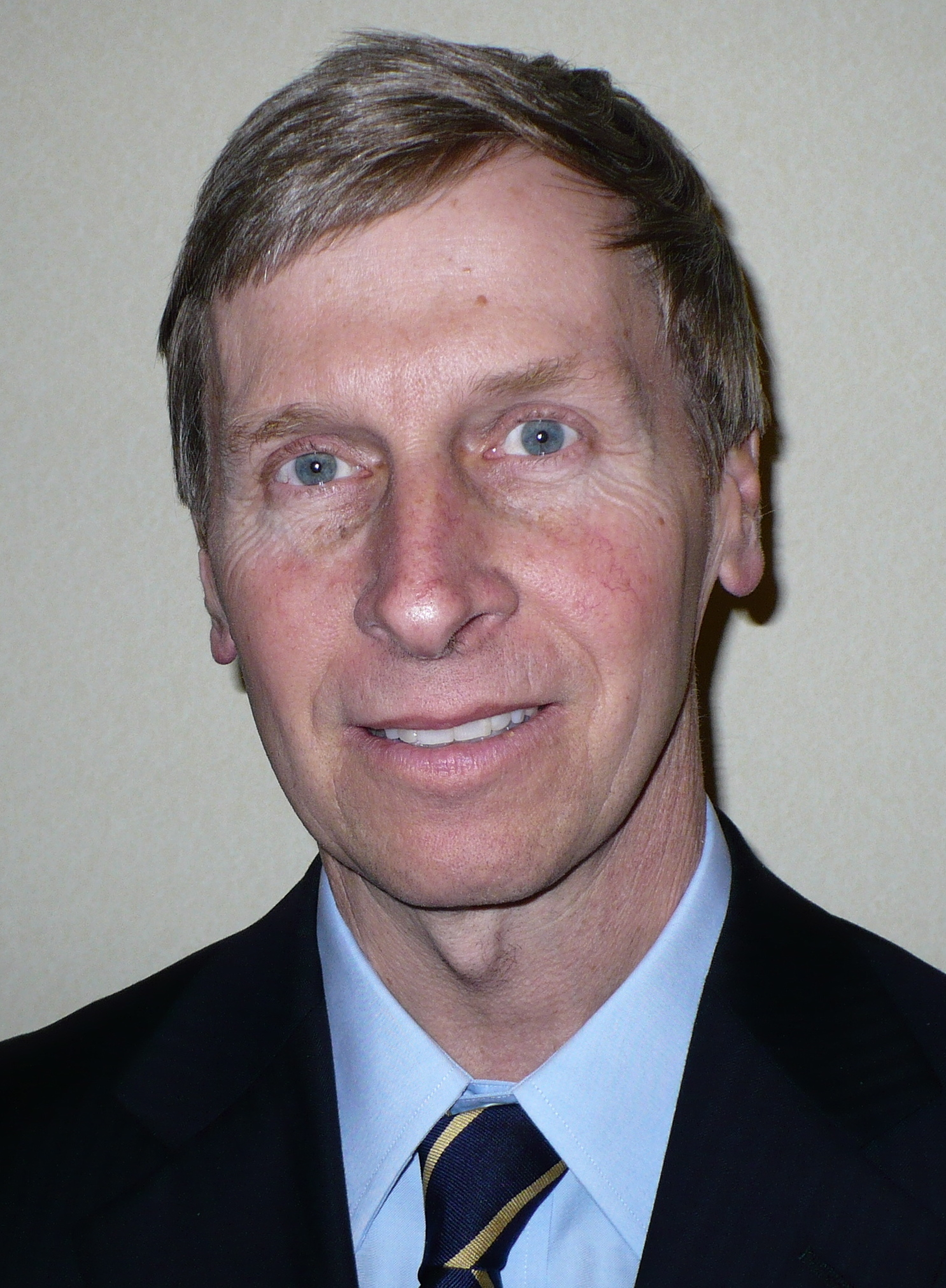

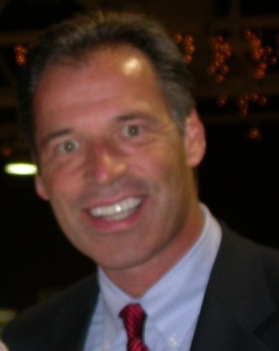
Nominee	John Lynch	Craig Benson
Party	Democratic	Republican
Popular vote	340,299	325,981
Percentage	51.0%	48.9%
- Lynch: 50–60% 60–70% 70–80% >90% Benson: 50–60% 60–70% 80–90% >90%
Governor before election
Craig Benson
Republican
Elected Governor
John Lynch
Democratic

The 2004 New Hampshire gubernatorial election occurred on November 2, 2004, concurrent with that year's presidential election. Democrat John Lynch, a multimillionaire businessman from Hopkinton, narrowly defeated incumbent Republican governor Craig Benson of Rye, winning a two-year term. Benson was the first New Hampshire governor in 80 years to lose reelection after one term. Lynch was sworn in on January 6, 2005.

To date, Benson is the most recent incumbent governor to lose reelection in any New England state.

== North Carolina ==
2004 North Carolina gubernatorial election
- November 2, 2004
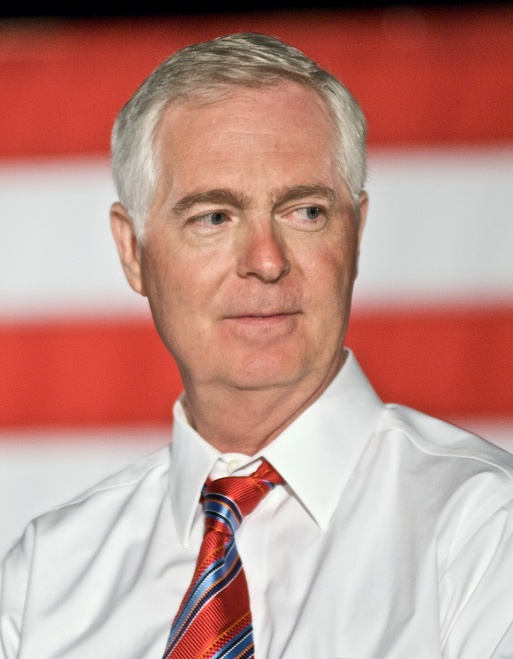

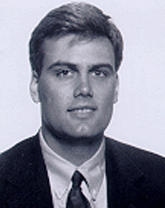
Nominee	Mike Easley	Patrick Ballantine
Party	Democratic	Republican
Popular vote	1,939,154	1,495,021
Percentage	55.6%	42.9%
- Easley: 40–50% 50–60% 60–70% 70–80% 80–90% >90% Ballantine: 40–50% 50–60% 60–70% 70–80% 80–90% Tie: 40–50%
Governor before election
Mike Easley
Democratic
Elected Governor
Mike Easley
Democratic

The 2004 North Carolina gubernatorial election was held on November 2, 2004. The general election was between the Democratic incumbent Mike Easley and the Republican nominee Patrick J. Ballantine. Easley won by 56% to 43%, winning his second term as governor. This is the last time a Democrat was elected governor of North Carolina by double digits.

== North Dakota ==
2004 North Dakota gubernatorial election
- November 2, 2004
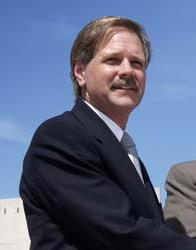

Nominee	John Hoeven	Joe Satrom
Party	Republican	Democratic–NPL
Running mate	Jack Dalrymple	Deb Mathern
Popular vote	220,803	84,877
Percentage	71.3%	27.4%
- County results Hoeven: 50–60% 60–70% 70–80% 80–90% Satrom: 50–60%
Governor before election
John Hoeven
Republican
Elected Governor
John Hoeven
Republican

The 2004 North Dakota gubernatorial election took place on 2 November 2004 for the post of Governor of North Dakota. Incumbent Republican governor John Hoeven was easily re-elected defeating Democratic-NPL former state senator Joe Satrom.

== Utah ==
2004 Utah gubernatorial election
- November 2, 2004
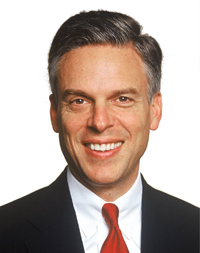

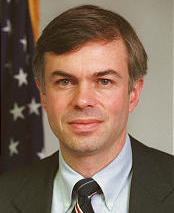
Nominee	Jon Huntsman Jr.	Scott Matheson Jr.
Party	Republican	Democratic
Running mate	Gary Herbert	Karen Hale
Popular vote	531,190	380,359
Percentage	57.7%	41.4%
- County results Huntsman: 50–60% 60–70% 70–80% Matheson: 50–60% 60–70%
Governor before election
Olene Walker
Republican
Elected Governor
Jon Huntsman, Jr.
Republican

The 2004 Utah gubernatorial election took place on November 2, 2004. The incumbent governor was Republican Olene S. Walker, who had become governor following Mike Leavitt's resignation to join the George W. Bush administration. However, Walker placed fourth in the Republican primary, far behind Jon Huntsman Jr. Huntsman won the nomination and went on to win the general election, carrying 25 of the 29 counties and winning 57.7% of the overall vote. This was the last time that a Democratic nominee for any statewide office has received forty percent or more of the popular vote, and the most recent election in which a Democratic nominee carried more than three counties in the state.

== Vermont ==
2004 Vermont gubernatorial election
- November 2, 2004
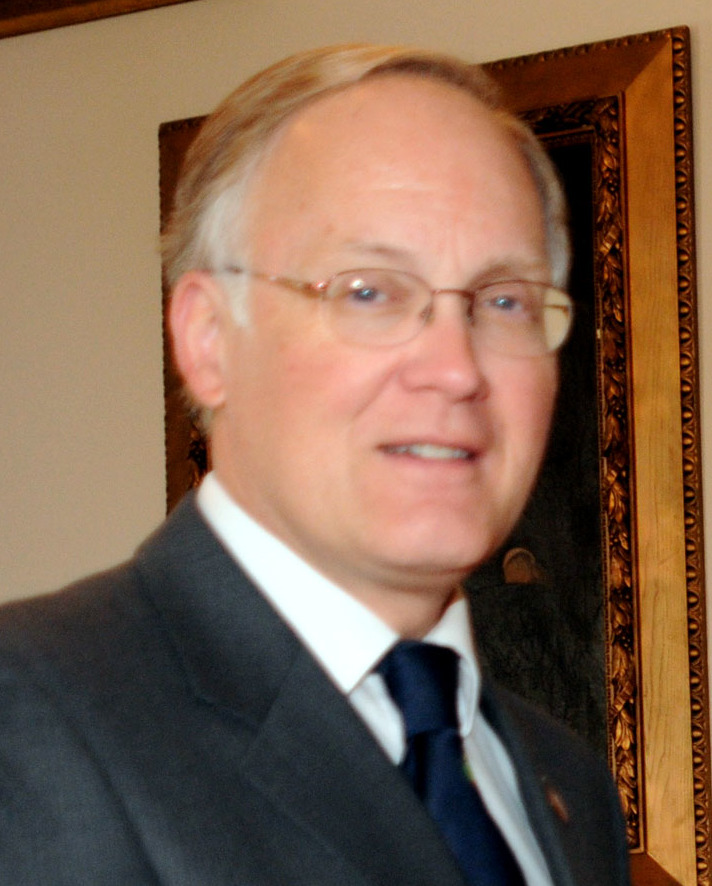

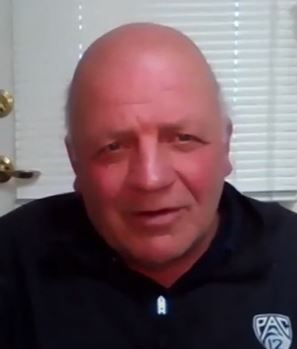
Nominee	Jim Douglas	Peter Clavelle
Party	Republican	Democratic
Popular vote	181,540	117,327
Percentage	58.7%	37.9%
- Douglas: 40-50% 50-60% 60-70% 70-80% 80-90% Clavelle: 40-50% 50-60% 60-70% 70-80% Tie: 50-60%
Governor before election
Jim Douglas
Republican
Elected Governor
Jim Douglas
Republican

The 2004 Vermont gubernatorial election took place November 2, 2004 for the post of Governor of Vermont. Incumbent Republican governor Jim Douglas was re-elected. Douglas defeated Peter Clavelle, the Progressive Mayor of Burlington, who ran as a Democrat.

== Washington ==
2004 Washington gubernatorial election
- November 2, 2004
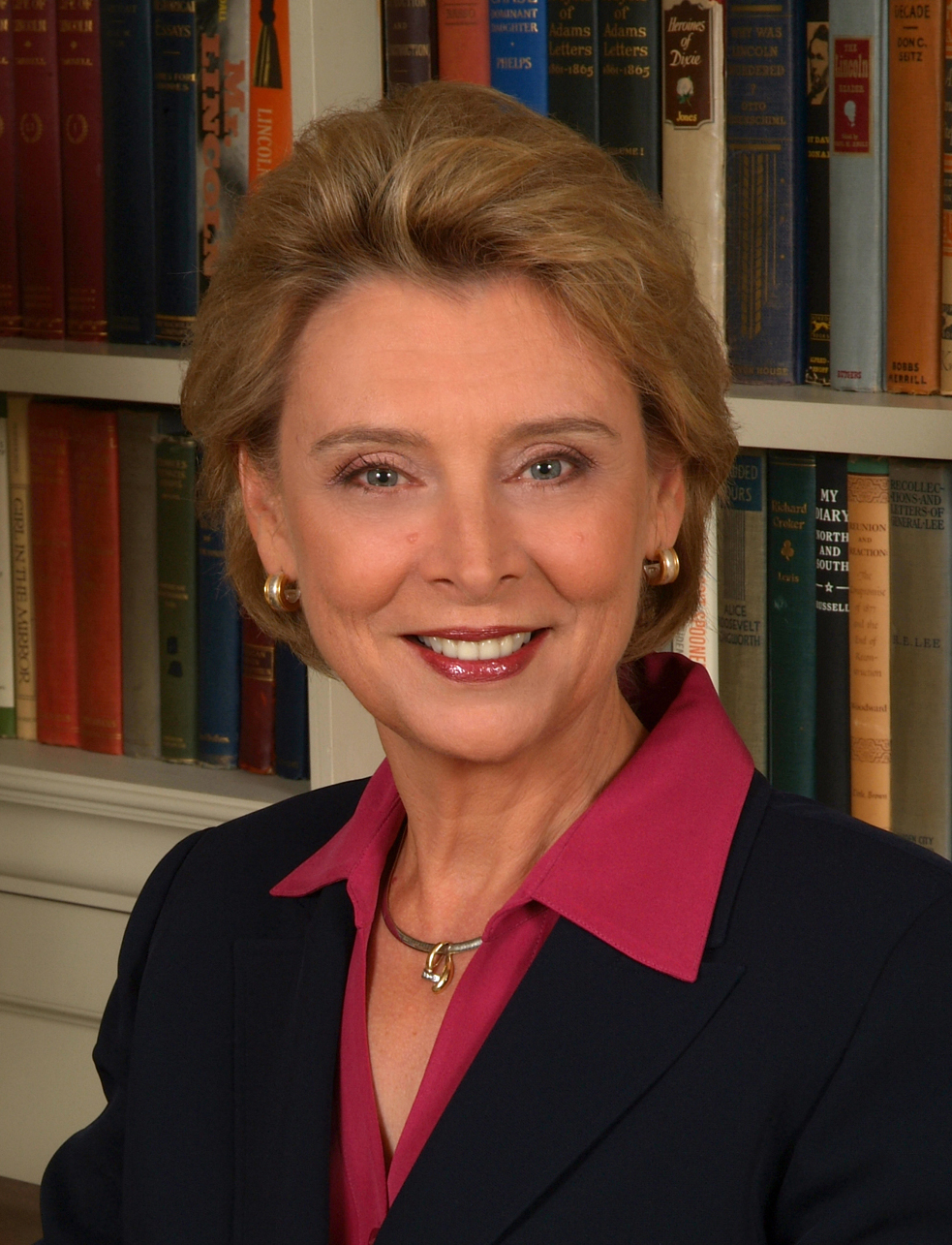

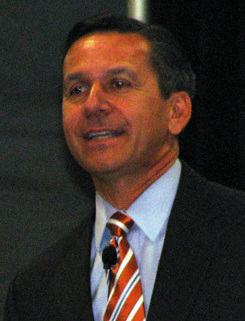
Nominee	Christine Gregoire	Dino Rossi
Party	Democratic	Republican
Popular vote	1,373,361	1,373,228
Percentage	48.873%	48.868%
- County results Gregoire: 40–50% 50–60% Rossi: 40–50% 50–60% 60–70%
Governor before election
Gary Locke
Democratic
Elected Governor
Christine Gregoire
Democratic

The 2004 Washington gubernatorial election was held on November 2, 2004. The race gained national attention for its legal twists and extremely close finish, among the closest political races in United States election history. Republican Dino Rossi was declared the winner in the initial automated count and again in a subsequent automated recount, but after a second recount done by hand, Democrat Christine Gregoire took the lead by a margin of 129 votes.

Although Gregoire was sworn in as governor of Washington on January 12, 2005, Rossi did not formally concede and called for a re-vote over concerns about the integrity of the election. The Republican Party filed a lawsuit in Chelan County Superior Court contesting the election, but the trial judge ruled against it, citing lack of evidence of deliberate electoral sabotage. Rossi chose not to appeal to the Washington State Supreme Court, formally conceding the election on June 6, 2005.

== West Virginia ==
2004 West Virginia gubernatorial election
- November 2, 2004
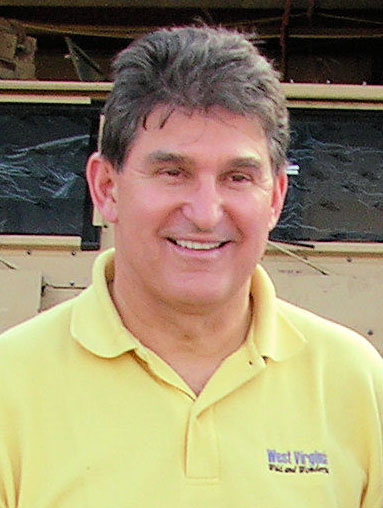

Nominee	Joe Manchin	Monty Warner
Party	Democratic	Republican
Popular vote	472,758	253,131
Percentage	63.5%	34.0%
- County results Manchin: 40–50% 50–60% 60–70% 70–80% 80–90% Warner: 40–50% 50–60%
Governor before election
Bob Wise
Democratic
Elected Governor
Joe Manchin
Democratic

The 2004 West Virginia gubernatorial election took place on November 2, 2004 for the post of Governor of West Virginia. Democratic Secretary of State of West Virginia Joe Manchin defeated Republican Monty Warner. Manchin won all but three counties. Despite Democratic presidential nominee John Kerry losing the state to George W. Bush by double digits in the concurrent presidential election, Manchin won by nearly 30 points.

== Territories ==
=== American Samoa ===
2004 American Samoan general election
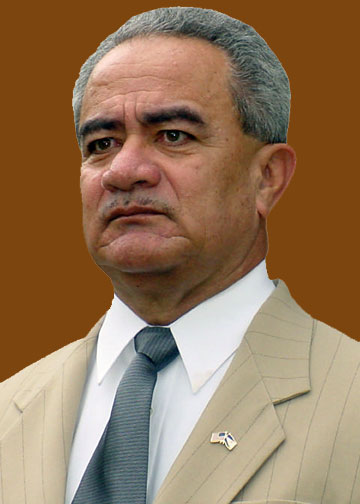

Nominee	Togiola Tulafono	Afoa Moega Lutu	Alo Paul Stevenson
Party	Democratic	Independent	Independent
First round	48.4%	39.4%	12.2%
Second round	6,407 (55.72%)	5,091 (44.28%)

=== Puerto Rico ===
2004 United States gubernatorial elections
- 2 November 2004
- Gubernatorial election
- Turnout: 81.22% (▼1.00pp)
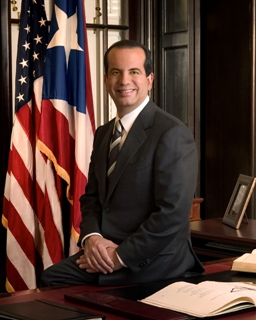

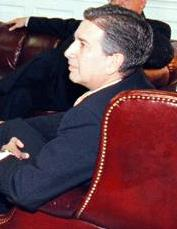
Nominee	Aníbal Acevedo Vilá	Pedro Rosselló
Party	Popular Democratic	New Progressive
Alliance	Democratic	Democratic
Popular vote	963,303	959,737
Percentage	48.39%	48.21%
- Results by municipality Acevedo Vilá: 40-50% 50-60% Rosselló: 40–50% 50–60% 60-70%
Governor before election
Sila María Calderón
Popular Democratic
Elected Governor
Aníbal Acevedo Vilá
Popular Democratic

== See also ==
- 2004 United States elections
  - 2004 United States presidential election
  - 2004 United States Senate elections
  - 2004 United States House of Representatives elections
