= 2004 New Hampshire gubernatorial election =

- November 2, 2004
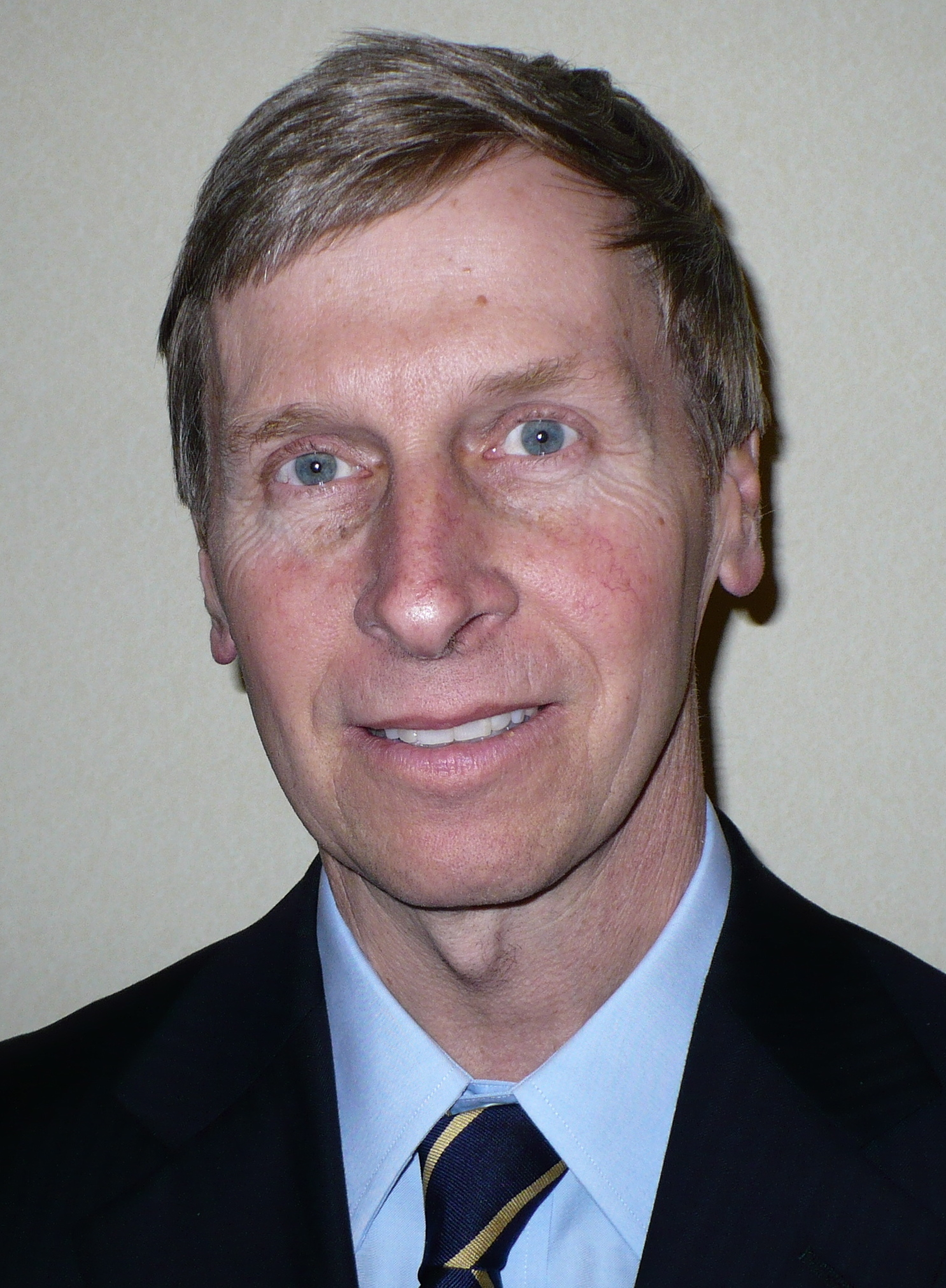

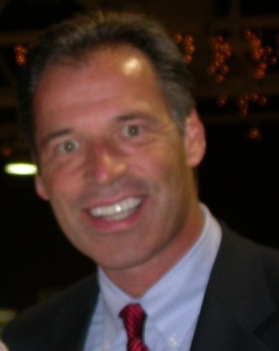
Nominee	John Lynch	Craig Benson
Party	Democratic	Republican
Popular vote	340,299	325,981
Percentage	51.02%	48.87%
- Lynch: 50–60% 60–70% 70–80% >90% Benson: 50–60% 60–70% 80–90% >90%
Governor before election
Craig Benson
Republican
Elected Governor
John Lynch
Democratic

The 2004 New Hampshire gubernatorial election occurred on November 2, 2004, concurrent with that year's presidential election. Democrat John Lynch, a multimillionaire businessman from Hopkinton, narrowly defeated incumbent Republican governor Craig Benson of Rye, winning a two-year term. Benson was the first New Hampshire governor in 80 years to lose reelection after one term. Lynch was sworn in on January 6, 2005.

To date, Benson is the most recent incumbent governor to lose reelection in any New England state.

== Democratic primary ==
=== Candidates ===
- John Lynch, businessman and University System of New Hampshire Trustee
- Paul McEachern, perennial candidate

=== Results ===
Democratic Primary results
Party	Candidate	Votes	%
Democratic	John Lynch	43,798	74.28%
Democratic	Paul McEachern	14,403	24.43%
Democratic	Write-ins	761	1.29%
Total votes		58,962	100.00%

== Republican primary ==
=== Candidates ===
- Craig Benson, incumbent governor of New Hampshire
- Charles Tarbell, New Castle selectman

=== Results ===
Republican primary results
Party	Candidate	Votes	%
Republican	Craig Benson (incumbent)	49,097	74.00%
Republican	Charles Tarbell	13,621	20.53%
Republican	Write-ins	3,632	5.47%
Total votes		66,350	100.00%

== General election ==
=== Predictions ===
Source	Ranking	As of
Sabato's Crystal Ball	Lean R	November 1, 2004

=== Results ===
New Hampshire gubernatorial election, 2004
Party	Candidate	Votes	%	±%
Democratic	John Lynch	340,299	51.02%	+12.80%
Republican	Craig Benson (incumbent)	325,981	48.87%	−9.75%
Write-in		740	0.11%	N/A
Total votes		667,020	100.00%	N/A
Democratic gain from Republican				

==== By county ====
County	John Lynch Democratic		Craig Benson Republican		Various candidates Other parties		Margin		Total votes cast
County	#	%	#	%	#	%	#	%	Total votes cast
Belknap	14,304	44.8%	17,598	55.1%	45	0.1%	-3,294	-10.3%	31,947
Carroll	12,003	43.1%	15,797	56.8%	20	0.1%	-3,794	-13.7%	27,820
Cheshire	24,085	59.6%	16,225	40.1%	107	0.3%	7,860	19.5%	40,417
Coos	8,884	53.2%	7,790	46.7%	14	0.1%	1,094	6.5%	16,688
Grafton	25,043	54.5%	20,842	45.4%	45	0.1%	4,201	9.1%	45,930
Hillsborough	91,344	47.5%	100,867	52.4%	205	0.1%	-9,523	-4.9%	192,416
Merrimack	45,403	59.8%	30,443	40.1%	89	0.1%	14,960	19.7%	75,935
Rockingham	75,885	48.6%	80,174	51.3%	141	0.1%	-4,289	-2.7%	156,200
Strafford	31,912	54.8%	26,261	45.1%	56	0.1%	5,651	9.7%	58,229
Sullivan	11,436	53.3%	9,984	46.6%	24	0.1%	1,452	6.7%	21,444
Totals	340,299	51.0%	325,981	48.9%	740	0.1%	14,318	2.1%	667,020

Counties that flipped from Republican to Democratic

- Coös (largest city: Berlin)
- Grafton (largest city: Lebanon)
- Merrimack (largest city: Concord)
- Strafford (largest city: Dover)
- Sullivan (largest city: Claremont)

== See also ==
- U.S. Gubernatorial Elections, 2004
- New Hampshire gubernatorial election, 2006
