= NetLabs =

Software company

- Type: Private (acquired)
- Industry: Network management software
- Founded: 1989
- Founder: Unni Warrier, Anne Lam, Jon Biggar, Dan Ketcham
- Fate: Acquired by Seagate Technology; products later sold to Veritas Software and OpenService (LogMatrix)
- Headquarters: Cupertino, California, U.S.
- Products: NerveCenter, AssetManager, Vision
- Parent: Seagate Technology (1995–)

NetLabs was a software company that was founded in 1989 to address management of SNMP and CMOT (CMIP over TCP/IP) devices. CMOT was specified in RFC 1095. This RFC was subsequently obsoleted by RFC 1189. RFC 1147 mentions the company and some of its products in a catalog of network management tools. The company was acquired by Seagate Technology in 1995 as part of its Seagate Software division.

== History ==
The company was founded in Los Angeles, California by Unni Warrier, Anne Lam, Jon Biggar, and Dan Ketcham. Larry Wall, the inventor of the Perl programming language, joined the company. In 1991, the company relocated to Los Altos, California.

A number of employees moved from Los Angeles to the San Francisco Bay Area to continue with the company. Around this time, Unni Warrier and Anne Lam left the company, and Andre Schwager (as CEO) and Roselie Buonauro (head of Marketing) joined.

After being acquired by Seagate (announced March 20, 1995), the company moved to Cupertino, California. Seagate Software later sold the Network and Storage Management Group to Veritas Software, which in turn sold some of the software to OpenService, Inc. OpenService later changed its name to LogMatrix.

== Products ==
NetLabs products included:

- NerveCenter - network management console with correlation engine
- AssetManager - networked computing asset database with auto-discovery
- Vision - WYSIWYG network element panel simulator

The network management marketplace during the years before it was acquired included HP (OpenView), Sun (SunNet Manager, and Solstice Enterprise Manager), Cabletron (Spectrum) and others. NetLabs licensed software to Sun. It also released a version of software that would allow it to coexist and augment OpenView instead of directly competing.

Ultimately, one of the products, NerveCenter, is being offered by LogMatrix.
