= Thomas Hassan =

First Gentleman of New Hampshire

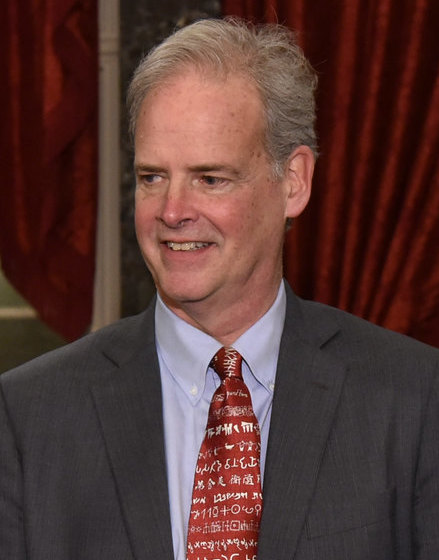

First Gentleman of New Hampshire
- In role January 3, 2013 – January 2, 2017
- Governor: Maggie Hassan
- Preceded by: Susan Lynch (First Lady)
- Succeeded by: Valerie Sununu (First Lady)

14th Principal of Phillips Exeter Academy
- In office September 2009 – June 2015
- Preceded by: Tyler Chapman Tingley
- Succeeded by: Lisa MacFarlane

Personal details
- Spouse: Maggie Wood
- Children: 2
- Education: Brown University (BA); Harvard University (MEd, EdD)

Thomas Edward Hassan is an American educator and administrator. He is the husband of Maggie Hassan, the junior U.S. Senator and former Governor of New Hampshire. He was First Gentleman of New Hampshire from 2013 to 2017. He was formerly the principal of Phillips Exeter Academy.

== Education ==
Hassan earned a bachelor of arts degree at Brown University in Providence, Rhode Island. He earned his master's and doctoral degrees in education at Harvard University in Cambridge, Massachusetts.

== Career ==
He joined Phillips Exeter Academy in 1989 as director of college counseling, and later became dean of admissions. During his 20 years at Exeter, Hassan taught mathematics and junior studies. He was also dorm affiliate and an advisor to student organizations including Best Buddies and the Random Acts of Kindness club.

In 2009, he became the 14th principal of the academy, serving until his retirement in 2015. In 2011, The New York Observer named Hassan as one of 24 "Elite Private School Power Players". In 2016, Hassan was censured by The Association of Boarding Schools for failing to disclose sexual misconduct of a former teacher at Phillips Exeter.

As First Gentleman, he embarked on a "Help Out New Hampshire" tour. He has served as the president of School Year Abroad since June 2016.
