= Susan Lynch (pediatrician) =

American pediatrician

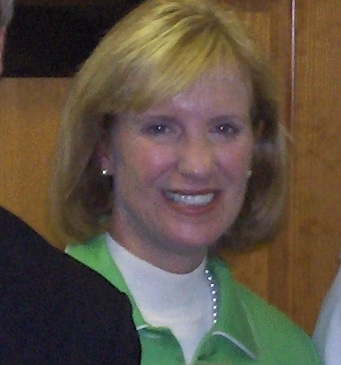

First Lady of New Hampshire
- In role January 6, 2005 – January 3, 2013
- Governor: John Lynch
- Preceded by: Denise Benson
- Succeeded by: Thomas Hassan (First Gentleman)

Personal details
- Born: Saugus, Massachusetts, U.S.
- Party: Democratic
- Spouse: John Lynch
- Children: Jacqueline; Julia; Hayden
- Education: Mount Holyoke College, University of Massachusetts Medical School
- Profession: Pediatrician

Susan E. Lynch is an American pediatrician and the wife of John Lynch, the Democratic former governor of New Hampshire. From 2005 to 2013, Lynch was First Lady of New Hampshire.

Since 2011, Lynch has been a pediatric lipid specialist at Dartmouth Hitchcock Clinic in Bedford, New Hampshire. She was a pediatric lipid specialist at the Cholesterol Treatment Center at Concord Hospital in Concord, New Hampshire from 2005 to 2011.

== Early life and education ==
Lynch grew up in Saugus, Massachusetts, a Boston suburb. She graduated from Mount Holyoke College with a Bachelor's degree in Biologic Science in 1973. In 1986, she graduated from the University of Massachusetts Medical School in Worcester, Massachusetts with a Doctor of Medicine.

== Career ==
She started her pediatric internship at Tufts-New England Medical Center's Floating Hospital in Boston and finished her pediatric residency at Dartmouth-Hitchcock Medical Center in Hanover, New Hampshire.

She practiced general pediatrics at the Dartmouth Hitchcock Clinic in Concord before going on to complete the lipid training programs at Johns Hopkins Medical Center and through the National Lipid Association.

== First Lady of New Hampshire ==
Lynch was the First Lady of New Hampshire from 2005 to 2013. Lynch was a strong advocate of proper nutrition and physical exercise and the danger of childhood obesity. She served as the spokesperson for the physical activity program "Walk NH," which is designed to challenge New Hampshire families to have fun getting in shape. She endorsed legislation that would have required New Hampshire public schools to record the body mass index of students in grades 1, 4, 7 and 10 unless the child's parents objected.

== Political involvement ==
In November 2007, Lynch endorsed Hillary Clinton for President of the United States in the 2008 election. Her endorsement was considered notable by outlets including The Atlantic ahead of the 2008 New Hampshire primary. She became a national co-chairperson for the Clinton campaign.

In the 2020 election, Lynch introduced Jill Biden and Doug Emhoff, the spouses of nominees Joe Biden and Kamala Harris, respectively, at a campaign event in Bedford.

In 2024, Lynch was the leader of Granite State Healthcare Providers for Biden. In this role, she warned of the impact Donald Trump would have on healthcare access in New Hampshire if he were to win the election.

== Personal life ==
Lynch and her husband have three children, two daughters, Jacqueline and Julia, and a son, Hayden. Their daughter, Julia Williams, had been expected to run for governor in the 2026 election before ultimately declining, citing health issues. Lynch lives in Hopkinton, New Hampshire. She has been described as a "fitness fanatic," with a 2005 profile noting that she is currently an active runner and had previously been a dancer and gymnast.

Honorary titles
Preceded by Denise Benson	First Lady of New Hampshire; 2005–2013	Succeeded by Thomas Hassan
