= School Year Abroad =

American yearlong study abroad program for high school students

School Year Abroad logo

School Year Abroad (SYA) places American high school sophomores, juniors and seniors in one of three independently operated schools in Italy, France or Spain for a full academic year. From 1994 to 2020, SYA operated a campus in China. Students intensively learn the respective language of their country and live with a carefully selected host family. The program includes extensive cultural immersion, wherein select courses are taught in the native language, and requisite subjects such as math and English, are taught in English.

SYA provides academic advisors, college counseling services, and administers the AP, SAT, SAT II, and PSAT tests at each school. Students earn U.S. high school credits while attending SYA, and preparing for selective U.S. colleges and universities. SYA guides students through a challenging curriculum focused on developing skills for an increasingly interdependent world. Central to the SYA experience is the adventure of fully engaging with different languages, cultures and peoples.

Spanish teacher Clark Vaughan of Phillips Academy (Andover, Massachusetts) conceived the idea, and its founding charter member schools are Phillips Exeter Academy (Exeter, New Hampshire), and St. Paul's School (Concord, New Hampshire), although it operates independently of these, and its 41 member schools. SYA's home office is located in North Andover, Massachusetts.

SYA celebrated its 50th anniversary in 2015, SYA France celebrated its 50th anniversary in 2017, and SYA Italy celebrated its 20th anniversary in 2022.

The current president of School Year Abroad is Thomas Hassan, former President of Phillips Exeter Academy and former first gentleman of New Hampshire.

== Spain ==
The program in Spain is SYA's oldest. The original incarnation was "Schoolboys Abroad" and consisted of 11 students accompanied by founder Clark Vaughan and his wife Polly, plus two more teachers, who in 1964, traveled by ship on the MS Aurelia to study in Barcelona, Spain. Polly Vaughan chose the symbol that continues to serve as the logo for the program. Their son Christopher was in the fourth Andover class to participate in SYA.

Though founded in Barcelona, the program relocated to Zaragoza in 1999. The move took place in order to facilitate the ease with which students learned and heard Castilian Spanish spoke around them. As the program grew in Barcelona, it became clear that the proliferation of Catalan, as well as the number of tourists, detracted from the immersion of the students. The move to Zaragoza, the fifth largest city in Spain, provided students with a city environment with less tourist attraction, making it necessary for Castilian Spanish to be spoken throughout the city.

SYA Spain students attend classes on the sprawling, 425-square-meter second floor of a Neoclassical building in Zaragoza's city center on Paseo de Pamplona.

School-to-School Exchanges SYA students here are able to participate in various school-to-school exchanges all over the country, providing excellent opportunities to become friends with Spanish students their own age. These range from exchanges lasting one to five days to evening seminars organized once a week.

Through "One Day Here, One Day There", an SYA student spends a day at a high school in Zaragoza, hosted by a counterpart their age; that same Spanish student attends classes at SYA the next day.

The program “Five days in . . .” Burgos, Madrid, Toledo or Sevilla enables an SYA student to go to one of these cities to attend classes and live with a local host family for five full days.

== Italy ==
SYA Italy opened in 2001 and is located in Viterbo, 64 miles northwest of Rome. The school is housed in a palazzo decorated with a collection of 16th century frescoes. Three languages are offered; Italian, Latin & Ancient Greek. Students typically enroll in six courses, including English, math, and Italian. Other courses are taught in English, but gradually incorporate more Italian as student language proficiency deepens. Applied Agroecology combines biology, microbiology, ecology, chemistry, and organic chemistry with a focus on sustainability. There is a broad range of co-curriculars that are available; sports, applied arts, and musical opportunities. The popular 'International Gemellaggio' club connects SYA Italy students with local Italian peers for language and cultural exchanges.

== France ==
SYA France is located in Rennes, the capital of Brittany. Founded in 1967, it is SYA's second oldest program. SYA France is open to students who are currently enrolled in at least level II of French. The majority of students take seven credits, including English and math. All but the mathematics and English courses are taught in French.

Students are required to take English, math, and French language and culture. In addition to the three core courses, 3 other elective courses are required from the options of: French literature, art history, modern history, politics, visual media, architectural history, and environmental science.

Based on language proficiency tests administered in September and language-study previous records, students are placed in one of four groups (Arthur, Morgane, Lancelot, or Viviane which are named after characters from the fabled Knights of the Round Table which is thought to have taken place in Brittany). (As of 2019, these proficiency-based levels are no longer used.) for the courses taught in French. Adjustments in the groups are generally made early in the year if appropriate. Math placement is based on prior experience and a placement test. Courses meet for a minimum of four 45-minute periods per week.

SYA France school trips are scheduled in accordance with the French academic calendar; during French school vacations, students travel all over France and/or Europe.

== China (1994–2020) ==
In 1994, the Chinese government allowed School Year Abroad to begin a program in Beijing. It was the first of its kind at either a high school or college level, with students being placed in host families for the full school year. The program operated out of the Second High School Attached to Beijing Normal University. SYA China was open to both beginners and students who had already studied Mandarin. From the 2012–2013 year until 2020, SYA China saw a marked decline in student interest, with SYA's staff and Board of Trustees citing multiple challenges. Eventually, in March 2020, the compounding nature of this decade-long trend, along with the spread of the COVID-19 pandemic, culminated in the SYA Board of Trustees and leadership suspending operations at SYA China. SYA has expressed interest in restarting its presence in Asia in the future, preferably again within China.

All students took Mandarin Chinese Language, Chinese History, and Chinese Society and Culture, along with English and Math, for a total of six credits. These courses met four or five periods each week, with the exception of Chinese Culture and Society and Mandarin Chinese Language. Chinese Culture and Society met two periods each week, in addition to guest lectures and field trips. Mandarin Chinese Language met every day of the week for 2 consecutive periods. All courses except for Advanced Algebra with Functions, Precalculus and Advanced Topics in Mathematics, and Chinese Society and Culture, were taught at the honors or AP level.

Martial arts, traditional Chinese brush painting, calligraphy and music were offered as noncredit courses, pass/fail. Each course met once per week. Home schools may accept these courses for credit if deemed appropriate. School Year Abroad does not distinguish between tenth- eleventh- and twelfth-grade students in the organization of classes.

Students participated in the host high school's special events such as Sports Day, as well as within clubs such as Bilingual Club.

Students were placed in class according to their proficiency in Chinese, which was assessed by a diagnostic exam administered at the beginning of the school year.
