= Lisa MacFarlane =

American educator

15th Principal of Phillips Exeter Academy
- In office June 2015 – September 2018
- Preceded by: Thomas Hassan
- Succeeded by: William K. Rawson

Personal details
- Education: Princeton University (BA); University of Michigan (MA, PhD)

Lisa MacFarlane (born 1958) is an American educator who served as the 15th principal of Phillips Exeter Academy. Previously she served as the provost and Vice President for Academic Affairs at the University of New Hampshire, as well as a teacher of American literature at the university for 28 years.

MacFarlane has lived in the Netherlands, Italy, Spain, England, the Philippines and Aruba. She attended Phillips Academy, Exeter's rival school, where she graduated in 1975. She then earned a Bachelor of Arts degree in the English Language and Literature at Princeton University and rowed for their Women's Rowing Team, and graduated from the University of Michigan with a Master's and doctoral degree in American Cultures. She began at UNH as an assistant professor of English in 1987. While Provost at UNH, MacFarlane oversaw the opening of the Carsey School of Public Policy and the University of New Hampshire School of Marine Science and Ocean Engineering, along with helping the University of New Hampshire School of Law integrate with the University of New Hampshire.

On September 1, 2015, she replaced Thomas Hassan as principal of Phillips Exeter, where she also teaches English. MacFarlane has overseen the school's response to sexual misconduct scandals.

On February 2, 2018, she announced that she would step down and return to UNH. She was succeeded by Bill Rawson (PEA ’71) as Interim Principal for the 2018–2019 and 2019–2020 academic years. On January 25, 2019, Rawson was appointed as the 16th Principal Instructor of Phillips Exeter Academy. Mr. Rawson is just the second alumnus (after William Saltonstall) in the last 143 years to serve as Exeter's Principal Instructor.
