= Mark Fernald =

American politician

Member of the New Hampshire Senate from the 11th district
- In office December 2, 1998 – December 4, 2002
- Preceded by: Dave Wheeler
- Succeeded by: Andrew Peterson

Personal details
- Born: March 21, 1959 (age 67) Keene, New Hampshire, U.S.
- Party: Democratic
- Education: Amherst College (BA); Boston College (JD)

Mark Fernald (born March 21, 1959) is an American politician who served in the New Hampshire Senate from the 11th district from 1998 to 2002. He unsuccessfully ran for governor against Craig Benson in 2002, then unsuccessfully ran for Senate from the 9th district in 2018, where he was defeated by Jeanne Dietsch in the primary election.

New Hampshire Senate
Preceded by Dave Wheeler	Member of the New Hampshire Senate from the 11th district 1998–2002	Succeeded by Andrew Peterson
Party political offices
Preceded by Jeanne Shaheen	Democratic nominee for Governor of New Hampshire; 2002	Succeeded by John Lynch
