= Craig Benson =

American politician and entrepreneur (born 1954)

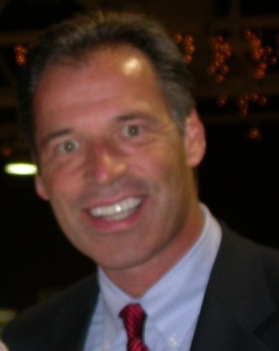
- Benson in 2004

79th Governor of New Hampshire
- In office January 9, 2003 – January 6, 2005
- Preceded by: Jeanne Shaheen
- Succeeded by: John Lynch

Personal details
- Born: October 8, 1954 (age 72) New York City, New York, U.S.
- Party: Republican
- Spouse: Denise Benson
- Education: Babson College (BBA); Syracuse University (MBA)

Craig R. Benson (born October 8, 1954) is an American politician and entrepreneur who served as the 79th governor of New Hampshire from 2003 to 2005. Benson first came to public attention when he founded Cabletron Systems, later known as Enterasys Networks, which became one of the largest employers in New Hampshire.

== Early life and business career ==
Benson attended Chatham High School in Chatham, New Jersey. After receiving a bachelor's degree in finance from Babson College in 1977, Benson attended Syracuse University, graduating with an MBA in 1979.

In 1983, Benson and partner Robert Levine started Cabletron Systems in Levine's garage. The company moved to Rochester, New Hampshire in 1985 and went public in 1989, with what was then the largest IPO in Wall Street history. In 1991, Benson was named "Entrepreneur of the Year" by Inc. Magazine.

The company grew to have over $1.8 billion in annual revenue, but over time Cabletron began to face heavy competition in the industry. Benson resigned in 1999, and Cabletron was dissolved into four separate companies (Enterasys Networks, Aprisma Management Technologies, Riverstone Networks, and Global Network Technology Services) in January 2000. The company's fragmentation brought layoffs, declines in stock price, and shareholder lawsuits.

== Governor of New Hampshire ==
Benson began running for governor of New Hampshire in 2001, promising to use technology and greater efficiency to save money in state government. Political signs appeared across New Hampshire proclaiming "This is Benson Country." He was elected governor on November 5, 2002, in an open race to succeed the retiring governor, Jeanne Shaheen. In the primaries, Benson spent more than $15 million—$11 million of it his own money—in an effort to defeat former state Senator Bruce Keough and former U.S. Senator Gordon Humphrey to win the Republican nomination, making Benson's victory one of the most expensive in American history. In the general election, Benson easily defeated Democratic state Senator Mark Fernald, by 90,386 votes. Benson successfully made Fernald's support for a statewide income tax the dominant issue in the race. Benson spent more than $9 million, again mostly his own money, in this race.

As Governor, Benson pushed for state agencies to institute across-the-board budget reductions, and used a custom made, extra large "VETO" stamp to reject a state budget he thought was too large. Benson also signed into law a bill that required parental notification for minors seeking an abortion; this law was later challenged and upheld in the Supreme Court in the case Ayotte v. Planned Parenthood of New England, but subsequently repealed by the New Hampshire legislature in 2007.

Benson's administration came under criticism following the resignation of Attorney General Peter Heed, who had been accused of sexual harassment. While an investigation cleared Heed of any wrongdoing, it revealed improper interference by Benson's security commissioner. Further criticism stems from the inappropriate awarding of a nearly $900,000 no-bid contract by his "volunteer" adviser (and former Cabletron human resource administrator) Linda Pepin, who was not licensed to broker such a deal.

Benson also frequently used "volunteers" in his office to do gubernatorial work, but would not say who they were or what they did. These were not volunteers in the sense that they were unpaid staffers volunteering their time, rather Benson paid their salaries out of his own pocket, making them volunteers in the sense that they did not draw state salaries. This move was controversial, while proponents noted that Benson was generously allowing the state to save money, critics were concerned that it would limit scrutiny of the volunteer staff. Reporters discovered that one of these "volunteers" (and former Cabletron director of operations), Angela Blaisdell, was New Hampshire's official liaison with the federal government on homeland security. In addition, Benson was accused of engaging in political payback when Dori Wiggin, supervisor of the Department of Environmental Services Wetlands Division in Portsmouth, was transferred to the department's Concord headquarters. Under Wiggin, the DES had fined Benson in 1998 and 2003 for excavating beach sand without a permit at his Rye oceanfront home.

Benson was also criticized, by both supporters and critics, for a management style that was considered "autocratic". In an interview with The New York Times, Benson stated that one of his first acts after being elected was to purchase a large, high table at which to hold his meetings. Those in attendance were to stand during meetings, and any latecomers were locked out. "It's to remind people we're here to get in and do our business and get out," he explained.

In the 2004 election, Benson lost to Democratic challenger John Lynch—only the second time in 78 years that an incumbent New Hampshire governor was denied a second term, in a very close race, Benson lost to Lynch by 14,318 votes.

== Post-governorship ==
Since leaving the Governor's office in 2005, Benson has pursued a number of business interests. He is a Dunkin' Donuts franchisee with over 140 stores. He served as a Director of Sycamore Networks (2007 to 2013) and currently serves (since 2017) as a Director at Planet Fitness where he also served as interim CEO from Sept. 2023 to April 2024.

In December 2020, Merrill Lynch was ordered by the New Hampshire Bureau of Securities to pay $24 million in restitution to Benson, and an additional $2 million fine to the State of New Hampshire. Benson complained to the Bureau of Securities in early 2019 after suffering losses while the stock market was gaining.

In 2025, Governor Kelly Ayotte appointed Benson to co-chair the Commission on Government Efficiency or "COGE", a commission tasked with cutting spending by the New Hampshire government. COGE is modeled on the Department of Government Efficiency, doing similar work at the federal level.

== Personal life ==
Benson resides in Rye, New Hampshire with his wife Denise. They have two daughters.

Benson serves as an adjunct lecturer at Babson College, his alma mater. In 1995, he was inducted into the college's Academy of Distinguished Entrepreneurs.

== Electoral history ==
New Hampshire Gubernatorial Election 2002
Party	Candidate	Votes	%	±%
Republican	Craig Benson	259,663	58.62	+14.86
Democratic	Mark Fernald	169,277	38.21	−10.53

New Hampshire Gubernatorial Election 2004
Party	Candidate	Votes	%	±%
Democratic	John Lynch	340,299	51.07	+12.87
Republican	Craig Benson (Incumbent)	325,981	48.93	−9.67

Party political offices
Preceded by Gordon Humphrey	Republican nominee for Governor of New Hampshire; 2002, 2004	Succeeded by Jim Coburn
Political offices
Preceded by Jeanne Shaheen	Governor of New Hampshire; 2003–2005	Succeeded by John Lynch
U.S. order of precedence (ceremonial)
Preceded by John H. Sununu as Former Governor	Order of precedence of the United States	Succeeded by John Lynch as Former Governor
