= Jim Coburn =

American politician

Personal details
- Born: 1944 (age 81–82) Boston, Massachusetts, U.S.
- Party: Republican

James B. Coburn (born 1944 in Boston, Massachusetts, United States) is an American entrepreneur, former New Hampshire state representative, and the 2006 Republican nominee for Governor of New Hampshire. He was born in Boston, Massachusetts, but moved to Chester, New Hampshire when he was seven years old to live with his grandmother after his mother died of cancer.

== Background ==
Coburn graduated from Pinkerton Academy in Derry, New Hampshire, and worked in a shoe factory before joining the United States Air Force. He was stationed in West Germany, serving as the crew chief of a special weapons maintenance team. It was there that he met his wife, Christa.

Settling in Chester with his wife, after leaving the service, he worked for Digital Equipment Corporation for 21 years. In 1994, he and a partner left Digital to start Valco Data Systems, which makes software to archive medical records.

Coburn's wife died in 2004 after a lengthy battle with multiple sclerosis. When she was diagnosed, he promised her that he would not put her in a nursing home or let her become bedridden. He also promised he would not enter politics as long as she lived.

He has said her experience has helped make health-care reform one of his top political priorities.

== Political career ==
=== New Hampshire House of Representatives (2004–2006) ===
Soon after his wife's death, Coburn sold his share of Valco to his partner and entered politics. He won a seat in the New Hampshire House of Representatives in 2004 representing Windham.

His voting record as a state representative has reflected a conservative position on taxes, abortion and opposition to gay marriage.

=== Running for Governor (2006) ===
In March, 2006, he hired the Manchester firm Meridian Communications to handle his upcoming gubernatorial campaign, and on June 14, 2006, filed his candidacy for governor at the statehouse in Concord.

He is a member of the National Rifle Association, Gun Owners of New Hampshire, Pelham Fish & Game Club, and the New Hampshire Historical Society.

On May 30, 2006, in the Concord Monitor, he stated his support for a gas tax as part of a comprehensive State energy plan promoting diesel and other, more efficient, fuel sources for motor vehicles Edited for accuracy and completeness.

Coburn was an underdog against Democratic incumbent, John Lynch, who in 2006 one of the most popular governors in the country. Results of the 2006 New Hampshire elections showed Lynch defeating Coburn by a landslide.

Coburn has two children and three grandchildren.

There was some speculation that Coburn might seek the Republican nomination for New Hampshire's 2nd congressional district to challenge incumbent Democrat Paul Hodes, but he did not, eventually endorsing Jennifer Horn for the position.

Party political offices
| Preceded by Craig Benson | Republican nominee for Governor of New Hampshire; 2006 | Succeeded by Joseph Kenney |
