= Cabletron Systems =

US computer network equipment manufacturer

Cabletron Systems, Inc.
- Founded: 1983
- Founder: Craig Benson; Robert Levine
- Fate: Dissolved
- Successor: Enterasys Networks; Riverstone Networks; Aprisma Management Technologies; Global Network Technology Services
- Headquarters: Rochester, New Hampshire
- Products: Networking devices, Ethernet products, switches, routers, software

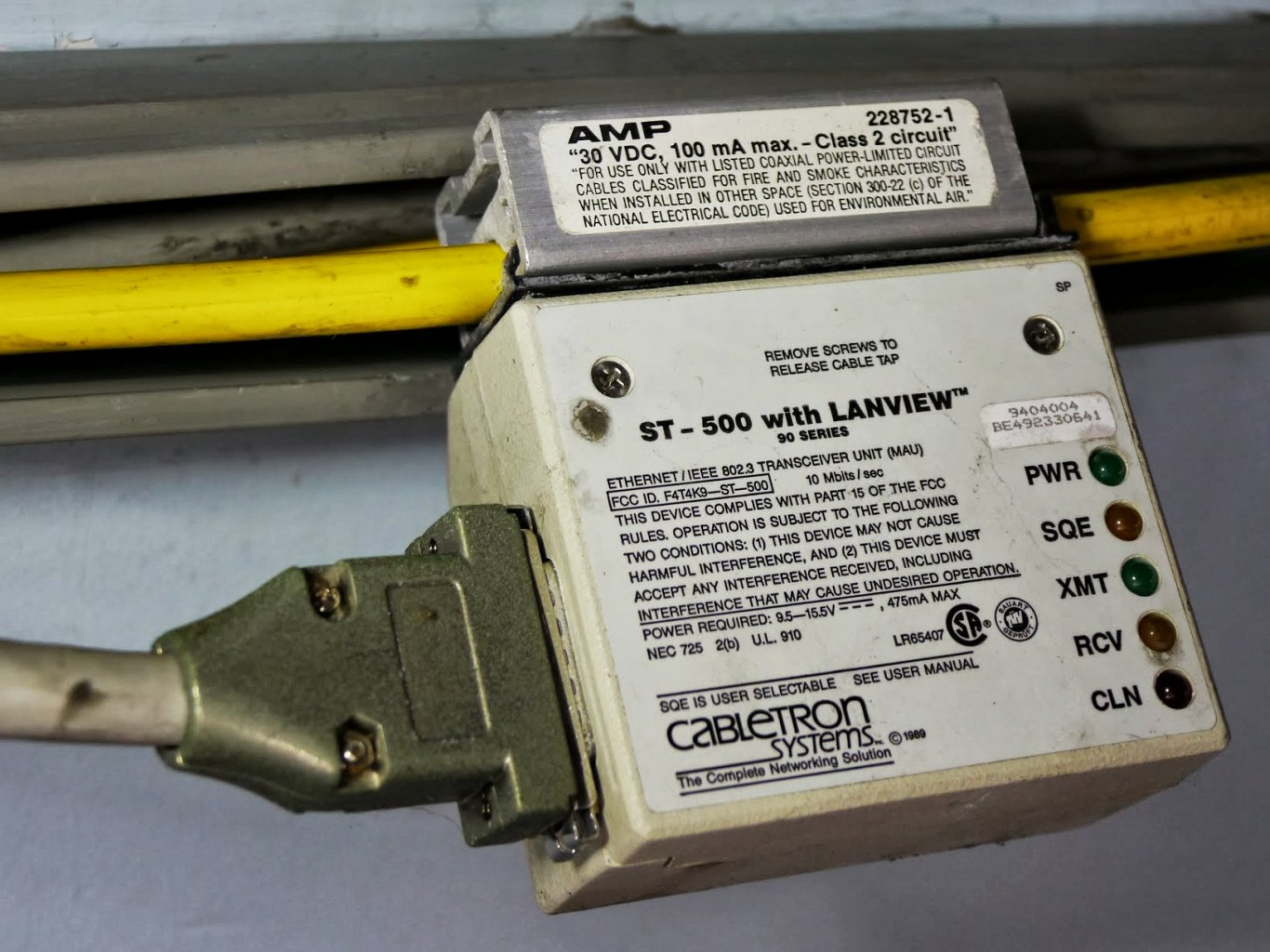
A ST-500 Ethernet/IEEE 802.3 transceiver (Vampire tap)

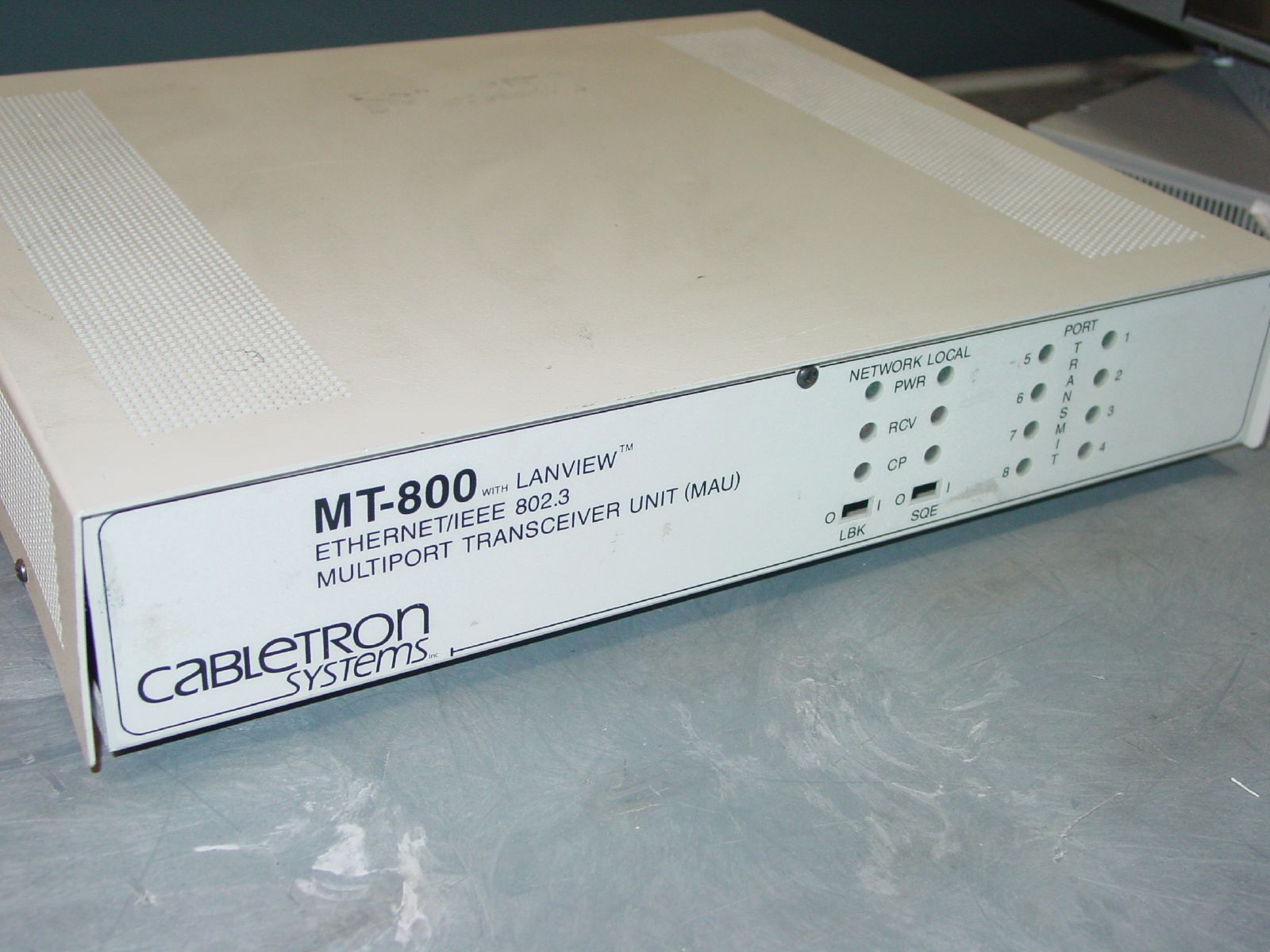
A Cabletron MT-800, Ethernet Tranceiver Unit

Cabletron Systems, Inc., was a manufacturer of networking computer equipment throughout the 1980s and 1990s primarily based in Rochester, New Hampshire, in the United States. They also had manufacturing facilities in Ironton, Ohio, and in Ireland.

== History ==
Cabletron was founded in 1983 in a Massachusetts garage by Craig Benson (who later became New Hampshire's governor) and Robert Levine. As manufacturing and design operations expanded, Cabletron relocated to Rochester, New Hampshire, employing 6,600 people at its peak. In 1996 the company eclipsed US$1 billion in sales. Cabletron found its first success in the 10BASE5 Ethernet market, providing the ST-500, the first Ethernet transceiver that featured diagnostic LEDs, and the LAN-MD, the first commercially viable field-deployable 10BASE5 test set. The early products were critical in the history of Ethernet as 10BASE5 Ethernet was generally difficult to operate and maintain and cabling problems were especially difficult to diagnose. Following on this early success, Cabletron developed one of the first modular Ethernet hubs, the MMAC-8 (and its smaller siblings, the MMAC-5 and the MMAC-3) at the time that 10BASE-T was becoming standardized. By developing high-density 10BASE-T modules (24 or 48 ports per slot), Cabletron was able to reduce the price per port of these hubs to a very affordable level, and by introducing a custom Element Management System known as Prism, made the MMAC-8 easy to maintain.

As Cabletron expanded its reach in the networking business, it initially moved into Layer 3 routing by partnering with Cisco, co-developing a Cisco router that would fit into the MMAC-8 hub. Cabletron ultimately developed its own routing capability, but found it increasingly difficult to compete at the low end of the Ethernet market and continue to invest in high-end routing technology.

Recognizing this fact, Cabletron reorganized as a holding company in 2000, hoping to apply appropriate focus to the different parts of its business as they had evolved over time. The holding company was set up to control four networking firms:

1. Enterasys Networks of Andover, Massachusetts, which was based on the original core products of Cabletron. Enterasys later merged with Cabletron Systems the holding company, though keeping the Enterasys name, before going public in 2001. Subsequently, Enterasys was taken private in 2006 by The Gores Group, which is owned by Alec Gores. In 2008, The Gores Group acquired a controlling interest in Siemens Enterprise Communications and merged the acquired company with Enterasys, pledging with Siemens to invest up to €350M in the new entity.
2. Riverstone Networks of Santa Clara, California, which was based on the assets of YAGO Systems, a company acquired by Cabletron as an attempt to move into the Switched Ethernet business. Riverstone Networks was the only actual spin-off of Cabletron's reorganization, and it was later acquired by Lucent Technologies, which in turn subsequently merged with Alcatel Networks. This final merger resulted in Riverstone assets becoming redundant with Lucent products and technologies, causing Alcatel-Lucent to wind down Riverstone Networks operations. Eventually, Riverstone was placed into Chapter 11 bankruptcy and liquidated.
3. Aprisma Management Technologies of Durham, New Hampshire (a subsidiary of Enterasys following the Cabletron paper merger). Aprisma held most of the original Cabletron network management technologies that were based on the SPECTRUM software suite (thus suggesting the name of the company). Aprisma was subsequently acquired by Concord Communications which in turn was acquired for $350M by Computer Associates, now renamed CA, Inc.
4. Global Network Technology Services (also known as GNTS) of The Woodlands, Texas, a network installation and management company. GNTS employed more than 800 people but was dissolved in 2001, a casualty of the dot-com collapse and subsequent contraction in demand for network services.

Enterasys Networks was now officially a Siemens Enterprise Communications company that manufactured all manner of networking equipment and to make available most of the documentation of the original Cabletron Systems products within its knowledge base.

On September 12, 2013, Extreme Networks agreed to buy Enterasys Networks for $180 million.
