= Riverstone Networks =

Provider of networking switching hardware

- Industry: Electronics
- Defunct: 2006
- Fate: Absorbed by Alcatel-Lucent
- Headquarters: Santa Clara, California, United States
- Parent: Cabletron Systems; Lucent Technologies (2006)

Riverstone Networks, was a provider of networking switching hardware based in Santa Clara, California. Originally part of Cabletron Systems, and based on an early acquisition of YAGO, it was one of the many Gigabit Ethernet startups in the mid-1990s. It is now a part of Alcatel-Lucent and its operations are being wound down via a Chapter 11 filing by their current owners.

== Company history ==
- 7 February 2006 - Riverstone's partner Lucent Technologies signed an Asset Purchase agreement to acquire Riverstone Networks.
- 21 March 2006 - Lucent Technologies wins the auction for Riverstone Networks over rival Ericsson. The final price was $207 million
- 18 April 2006 - Lucent Technologies are currently in the process of a merger of equals with Alcatel
- 1 December 2006 - Lucent Technologies completed the process of a merger of equals with Alcatel. Assets of Riverstone Networks are now part of Alcatel-Lucent

== Products ==
All of Riverstone Networks products were geared towards IP over Ethernet, often for a Metro Ethernet solution. All the products were multilayer switches (or switch-routers) and specialized in MPLS VPNs.

=== 15000 Family ===
The 15000 Family (referred to as the 15K) differed from the RS family as the 15K is not flow-based. Flow-based routers use the main CPU to process new flows and packets through the switch. The 15K differed by letting the line card processors do the work for the network traffic, leaving the main CPU to work on the system itself. This type of network processing is similar to Cisco's dCEF.

The 15K products were based on a different operating system than other Riverstone products, called ROS-X. It was designed to be modular and more like the common command line interface of Cisco.

- 15008 - The highest performance product from Riverstone. It supported a 96 port 10/100 Ethernet card, 12 or 24 port 1GB Ethernet cards and 1 or 2 port 10GB Ethernet cards. Support for ATM and PoS was planned.
- 15100/15200 - Designed with the same architecture and operating system as the 15008, the 15100 and 15200 were designed more for an access/distribution network role. They were semi-modular in design with some fixed 1G Ethernet ports and GBIC uplinks for either 1GB or 10GB.

=== RS Family ===
The RS family of products were flow-based multilayer switches. They ran ROS software, which had a command line interface but could also be configured via SNMP.

- 1x00 - Fixed hardware configuration
- 3x00 - Semi-modular in design, came with 32 fixed 100BaseT Ethernet ports and 2 modular bays
- 8x00 - Fully modular hardware, came in either 8 slot (8000) or 16 slot (8600) versions. The modules for the 8x00 included Control Modules, 100BaseT Ethernet, 1000BaseT Ethernet, 1000BaseX GibabitEthernet with interchangeable GBICs, including PoS, ATM, Serial, T1/E1, and T3/E3.
- 38000 - Fully modular hardware, differed from the rest of the RS range physically due to the modular slots being vertical.

== ES Family ==
- ES 2010 - Fixed 24 10/100 port multilayer switch designed for network access/network edge role. It had two GBIC ports for 1G Ethernet uplinks. The ES range did not support WAN ports or MPLS.
