= 2002 New Hampshire gubernatorial election =

- November 5, 2002
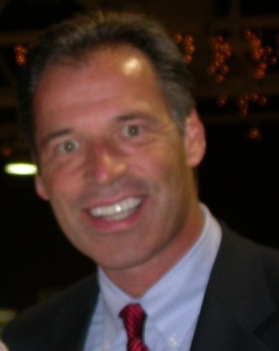

Nominee	Craig Benson	Mark Fernald
Party	Republican	Democratic
Popular vote	259,663	169,277
Percentage	58.62%	38.21%
- Benson: 40–50% 50–60% 60–70% 70–80% 80–90% >90% Fernald: 40–50% 50–60% 60–70% >90%
Governor before election
Jeanne Shaheen
Democratic
Elected Governor
Craig Benson
Republican

The 2002 New Hampshire gubernatorial election was held on November 5, 2002. Three-term incumbent Democratic governor Jeanne Shaheen opted to unsuccessfully run for the United States Senate rather than seek a fourth term as governor. Republican Craig Benson, a self-funded businessman, defeated Democrat Mark Fernald, a state senator, in the general election after both won contested primary elections.

This was the only time a Republican was elected governor between 1994 and 2016.

== Democratic primary ==
=== Candidates ===
- Mark Fernald, New Hampshire state senator
- Beverly Hollingworth, New Hampshire state senator

=== Results ===
Democratic Primary results
Party	Candidate	Votes	%
Democratic	Mark Fernald	34,683	53.28
Democratic	Bev Hollingworth	27,777	42.67
Democratic	Write-ins	2,632	4.04
Total votes		65,092	100.00

== Republican primary ==
=== Candidates ===
- Craig Benson, businessman
- Bruce Keough, former New Hampshire state senator
- Gordon J. Humphrey, former U.S. senator, 2000 Republican nominee for governor
- Robert Kingsbury, perennial candidate
- Joe Haas
- Bob Kroepel

=== Results ===
Republican primary results
Party	Candidate	Votes	%
Republican	Craig Benson	56,099	36.65
Republican	Bruce Keough	51,461	33.62
Republican	Gordon Humphrey	42,698	27.90
Republican	Robert Kingsbury	877	0.57
Republican	Joe Haas	759	0.50
Republican	Bob Kroepel	578	0.38
Republican	Write-ins	575	0.38
Total votes		153,047	100.00

== General election ==
=== Predictions ===
Source	Ranking	As of
The Cook Political Report	Lean R (flip)	October 31, 2002
Sabato's Crystal Ball	Likely R (flip)	November 4, 2002

=== Results ===
New Hampshire gubernatorial election, 2002
Party	Candidate	Votes	%	±%
Republican	Craig Benson	259,663	58.62%	+14.86%
Democratic	Mark Fernald	169,277	38.21%	−10.52%
Libertarian	John Babiarz	13,028	2.94%	+1.80%
Write-ins		1,008	0.23%	
Majority		90,386	20.40%	+15.43%
Turnout		442,976		
Republican gain from Democratic		Swing		

==== Results by county ====
County	Craig Benson Republican		Mark Fernald Democratic		All others		Margin		Total votes cast
County	#	%	#	%	#	%	#	%	Total votes cast
Belknap	14,691	67.8%	6,385	29.5%	599	2.8%	8,306	48.3%	21,675
Carroll	12,596	66.1%	5,930	31.1%	541	2.9%	6,666	35.0%	19,067
Cheshire	11,595	45.1%	13,320	51.8%	804	3.1%	-1,725	-6.7%	25,719
Coös	6,890	62.3%	3,823	34.6%	350	3.1%	3,067	25.7%	11,063
Grafton	16,182	54.3%	12,607	42.3%	997	3.3%	3,575	12.0%	29,786
Hillsborough	78,305	61.3%	45,324	35.5%	4,214	3.3%	32,981	25.8%	127,843
Merrimack	27,773	52.3%	23,711	44.6%	1,625	3.0%	4,062	7.7%	53,109
Rockingham	62,542	61.3%	36,342	35.6%	3,080	3.0%	26,200	26.7%	101,964
Strafford	21,352	55.9%	15,461	40.4%	1,410	3.7%	5,891	15.5%	38,223
Sullivan	7,737	53.3%	6,374	43.9%	614	2.9%	1,363	9.4%	14,257
Totals	259,663	58.6%	169,277	38.2%	14,036	3.2%	90,386	20.4%	442,976

Counties that flipped from Democratic to Republican

- Coös (largest city: Berlin)
- Hillsborough (largest city: Manchester)
- Grafton (largest city: Lebanon)
- Merrimack (largest city: Concord)
- Strafford (largest city: Dover)
- Sullivan (largest city: Claremont)

== See also ==
- U.S. Gubernatorial Elections, 2002
