= John Lynch (New Hampshire politician) =

American politician (born 1952)

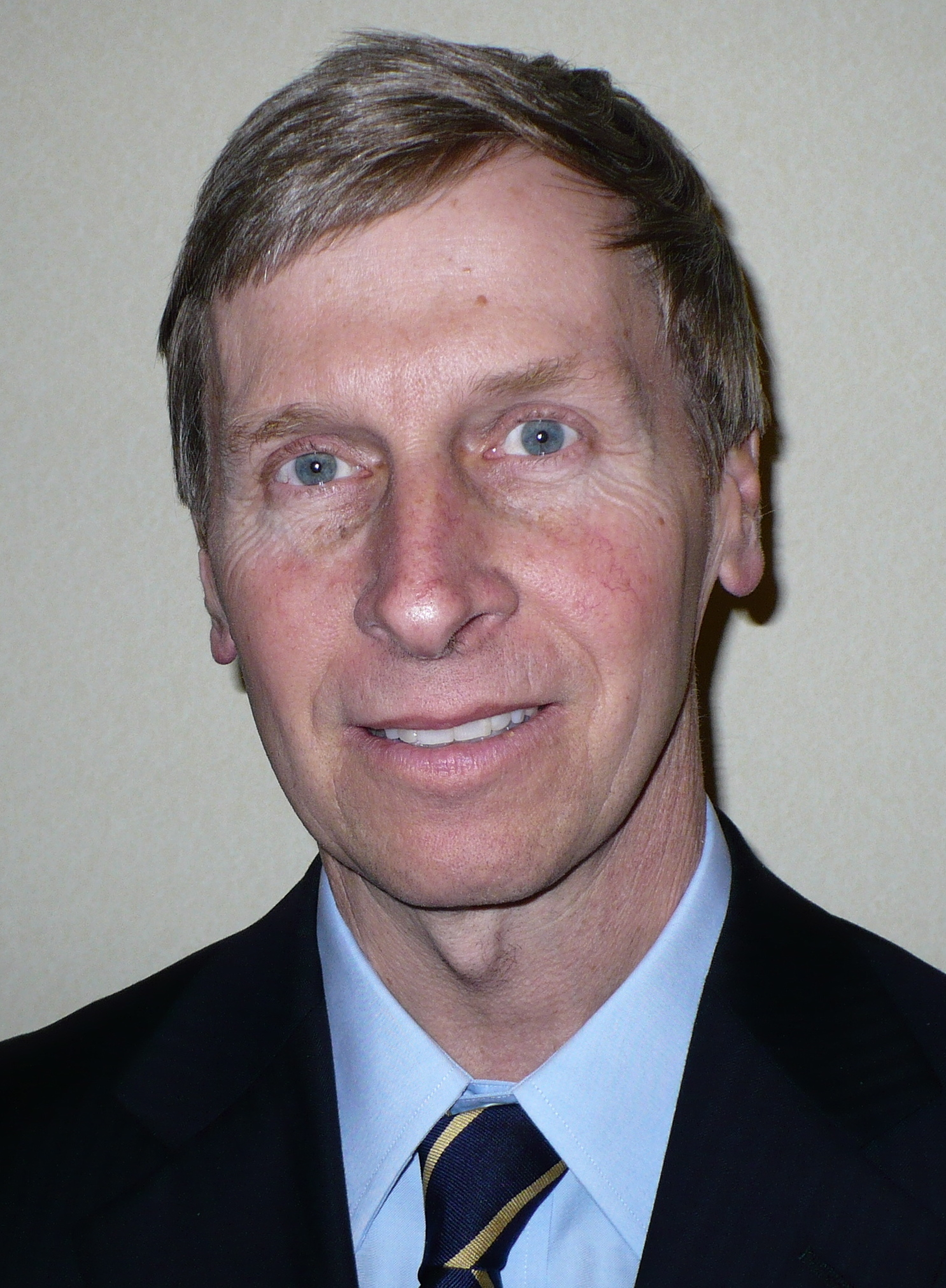
- Lynch in 2008

80th Governor of New Hampshire
- In office January 6, 2005 – January 3, 2013
- Preceded by: Craig Benson
- Succeeded by: Maggie Hassan

Personal details
- Born: John Hayden Lynch; November 25, 1952 (age 73) Waltham, Massachusetts, U.S.
- Party: Democratic
- Spouse: Susan Lynch
- Children: 3
- Education: University of New Hampshire (BA); Harvard University (MBA); Georgetown University (JD)

John Hayden Lynch (born November 25, 1952) is an American attorney, businessman, and politician who served as the 80th governor of New Hampshire from 2005 to 2013. Lynch was first elected governor in 2004, defeating first-term Republican incumbent Craig Benson – the first time a first-term incumbent New Hampshire governor was defeated for re-election in 80 years. Lynch won re-election in landslide victories in 2006 and 2008, and comfortably won a fourth term in 2010.

Lynch is one of the most popular governors in New Hampshire history and, while in office, consistently ranked among the nation's most popular governors.

Since 2013, Lynch has served as a senior lecturer in the MBA program at the Tuck School of Business at Dartmouth College.

== Early life, education and career ==
Lynch was born in Waltham, Massachusetts, the fifth of William and Margaret Lynch's six children. Lynch earned his Bachelor of Arts degree from the University of New Hampshire in 1974, a Master of Business Administration from Harvard Business School, and a Juris Doctor from Georgetown University Law Center.

During his business career, Lynch served as Director of Admissions at Harvard Business School and President of The Lynch Group, a business consulting firm in Manchester, New Hampshire. Lynch served as CEO of Knoll Inc., a national furniture manufacturer, where he transformed the company previously losing $50 million a year, to making a profits of nearly $240 million yearly. Under his leadership, Knoll created new jobs, gave factory workers annual bonuses, established a scholarship program for the children of employees, created retirement plans for employees who didn't have any, and gave workers stock in the company. Before announcing his run for governor, Lynch was serving as chairman of the University System of New Hampshire Board of Trustees.

== Governor of New Hampshire ==
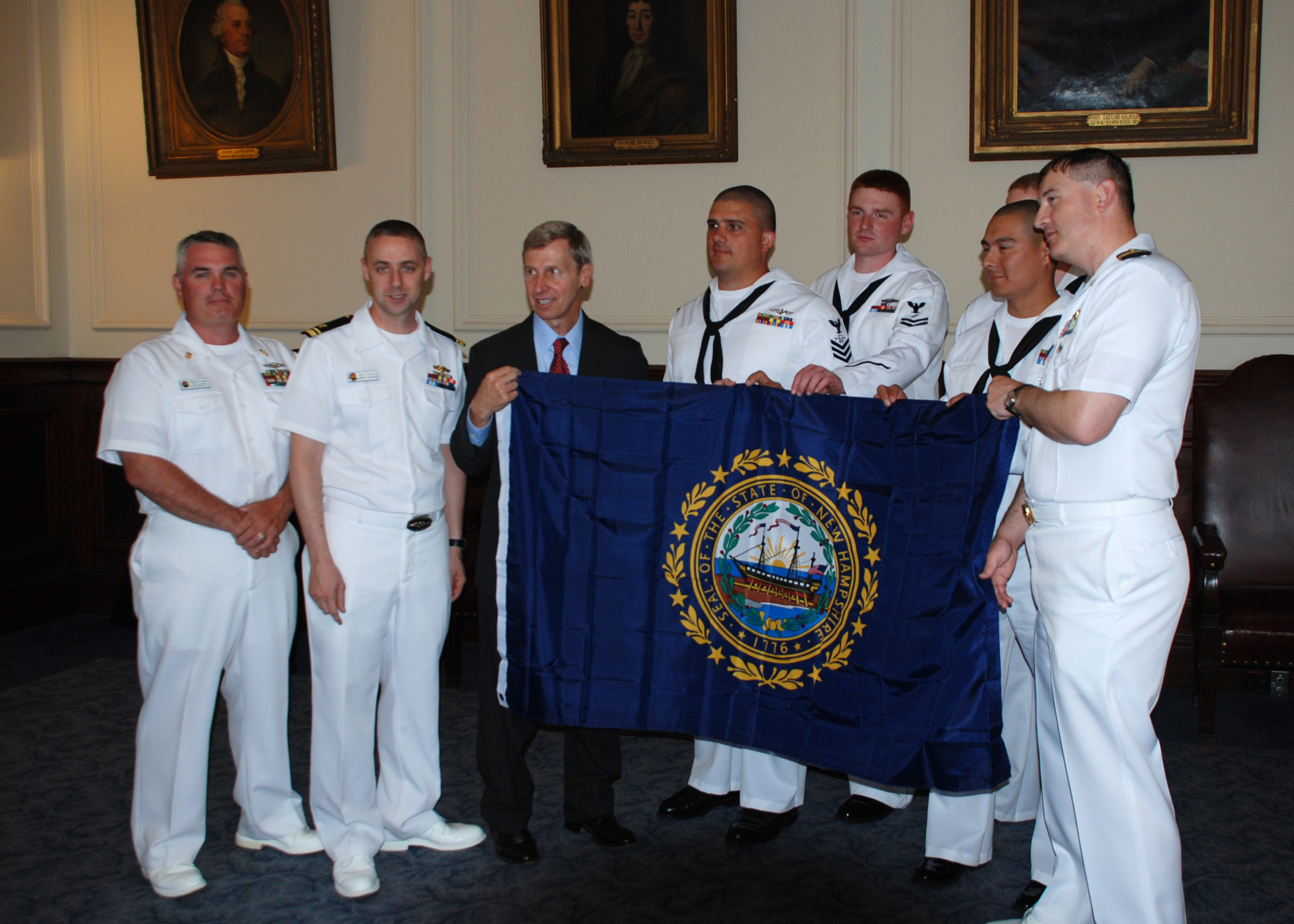
Governor Lynch poses with a New Hampshire state flag presented by Sailors assigned to the submarine USS New Hampshire (SSN-778), 29 July 2011

=== Electoral history ===
In June 2004, Lynch launched his campaign for Governor of New Hampshire.

Lynch spent the five months preceding the election relentlessly criticizing Governor Craig Benson, the first-term Republican incumbent, for what Lynch claimed was a lack of integrity following a long series of scandals during Benson's tenure. Lynch accused Benson of creating a "culture of corruption" and cronyism at the State House.

On September 15, Lynch won the Democratic primary and on November 2, Lynch defeated Benson 51% to 49%.

Lynch was the first challenger to defeat a first-term incumbent in New Hampshire since 1924. On January 6, 2005, Lynch was inaugurated as the 80th Governor of New Hampshire. On November 7, 2006, Lynch was re-elected governor in a 74% to 26% landslide victory over Republican challenger Jim Coburn. Lynch's 74% of the vote was the largest margin of victory ever in a New Hampshire gubernatorial race.

Lynch's coattails carried his party to control of both chambers of the State Legislature and both of New Hampshire's two U.S. House seats.

On November 4, 2008, he was elected to a third term in another landslide victory. Lynch defeated Republican challenger Joseph Kenney, a New Hampshire state senator and U.S. Marine, 70% to 28%, with 2% of the vote won by the Libertarian candidate. Democrats maintained control of the state legislature and held both U.S. House seats, and gained a U.S. Senate seat.

On November 2, 2010, Lynch was elected to a historic fourth term as Governor of New Hampshire, in a victory over former State Health and Human Service's Commissioner John Stephen, 53% to 45%. Lynch was the only Democrat elected to statewide office. As had happened in many states throughout the U.S. during the 2010 midterm elections, Democrats suffered heavy losses. Democrats lost control of both chambers of the State Legislature, control of the Executive Council and both of the U.S. House seats.

According to the Concord Monitor, when Lynch was inaugurated on January 6, 2011, he became "the state's longest-serving governor in nearly two centuries. John Taylor Gilman was the last governor to serve longer than six years, serving 14 one-year terms as governor between 1794 and 1816. (The state switched to two-year terms in 1877)" New Hampshire and neighboring Vermont are the only two States in the U.S. that use two-year terms.

On September 15, 2011, Lynch announced he would not seek a historic fifth term as governor.

During the announcement Lynch said "I feel like I have the passion and the energy to keep doing this work for a long, long time, but democracy demands periodic change. To refresh and revive itself, democracy needs new leaders and new ideas."

On January 3, 2013, Lynch was succeeded by fellow Democrat Maggie Hassan, marking the first time a Democrat succeeded a Democrat as the state's governor since the 19th century.

New Hampshire gubernatorial election (General Election)
Year	Winning candidate	Party	Pct	Opponent	Party	Pct	Opponent	Party	Pct
2004	John Lynch	Democratic	51.02%	Craig Benson (inc.)	Republican	48.87%			
2006	John Lynch (inc.)	Democratic	73.5%	Jim Coburn	Republican	26.5%			
2008	John Lynch (inc.)	Democratic	69.8%	Joseph Kenney	Republican	27.9%	Susan Newell	Libertarian	2.2%
2010	John Lynch (inc.)	Democratic	52.6%	John Stephen	Republican	45.1%	John Babiarz	Libertarian	2.2%

=== Tenure ===
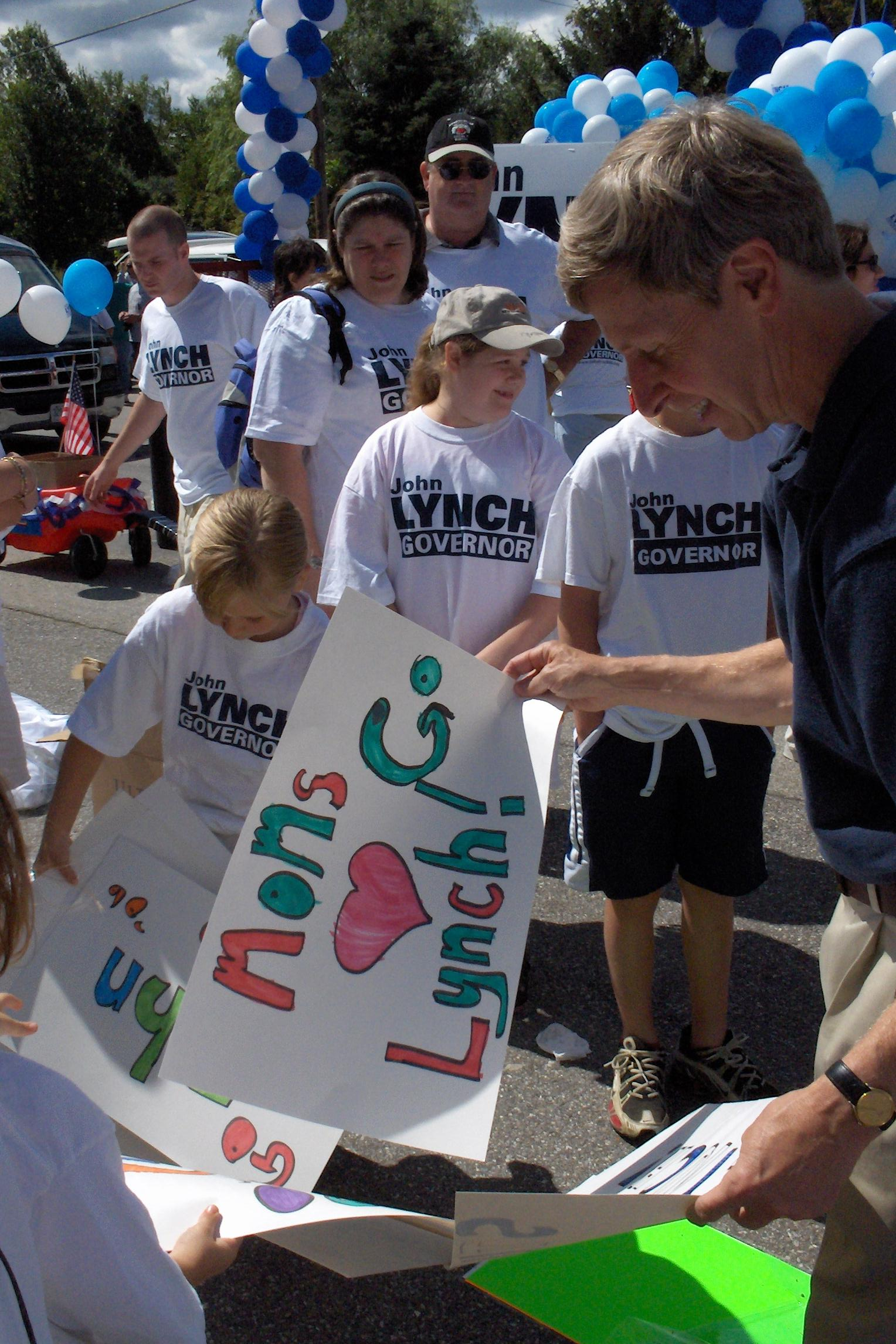
Governor Lynch in Milford, New Hampshire, Labor Day parade, September 2006

==== Taxes ====
As a candidate for governor, Lynch took "The Pledge" not to enact any broad-based taxes, especially a sales or income tax. As governor, Lynch kept his promise. Lynch does not support an amendment to the State Constitution banning an income tax.

In 2007, Lynch signed into law the Research and Development Tax credit, which for the following five years appropriated $1,000,000 for companies to write off qualifying "manufacturing research and development" expenditures. In 2012, during his final State of the State address, Lynch proposed doubling the tax credit, citing its success in creating jobs, and slammed lawmakers for slashing funding to the state's community college system to fund a 10-cent reduction in the tobacco tax.

In June 2010, Lynch signed a budget-balancing measure that repealed the state's LLC tax.

==== Crime ====
Lynch worked with the state Attorney General, police chiefs, and lawmakers to pass sex offender laws; increase the state police force; and increase the number of state prosecutors. New Hampshire was rated the "Safest State" in the Nation in 2008 and 2009. New Hampshire again boasts the nation's lowest murder rate and the second-lowest rates for aggravated assault, according to CQ Press. Lynch issued the following statement after the announcement of the award in 2009:

I am proud that working together we continue to keep New Hampshire the 'Safest State' in the nation. Our low crime rate has long been a part of what makes this such a great place to live and work, and it is important that we work to maintain our high quality of life. With this recognition, we should take time to thank the hard-working men and women of New Hampshire law enforcement who work every day to help keep us all safe.

==== Death penalty ====
Lynch upheld the death penalty while in office, stating "there are crimes so heinous that the death penalty is warranted." The New Hampshire House of Representatives passed legislation in March 2009 to abolish the death penalty, which Lynch threatened to veto. Due to the veto threat, the Senate tabled the legislation in April of that year. In June, Lynch compromised with legislators and signed legislation to form the New Hampshire Commission to Study the Death Penalty.

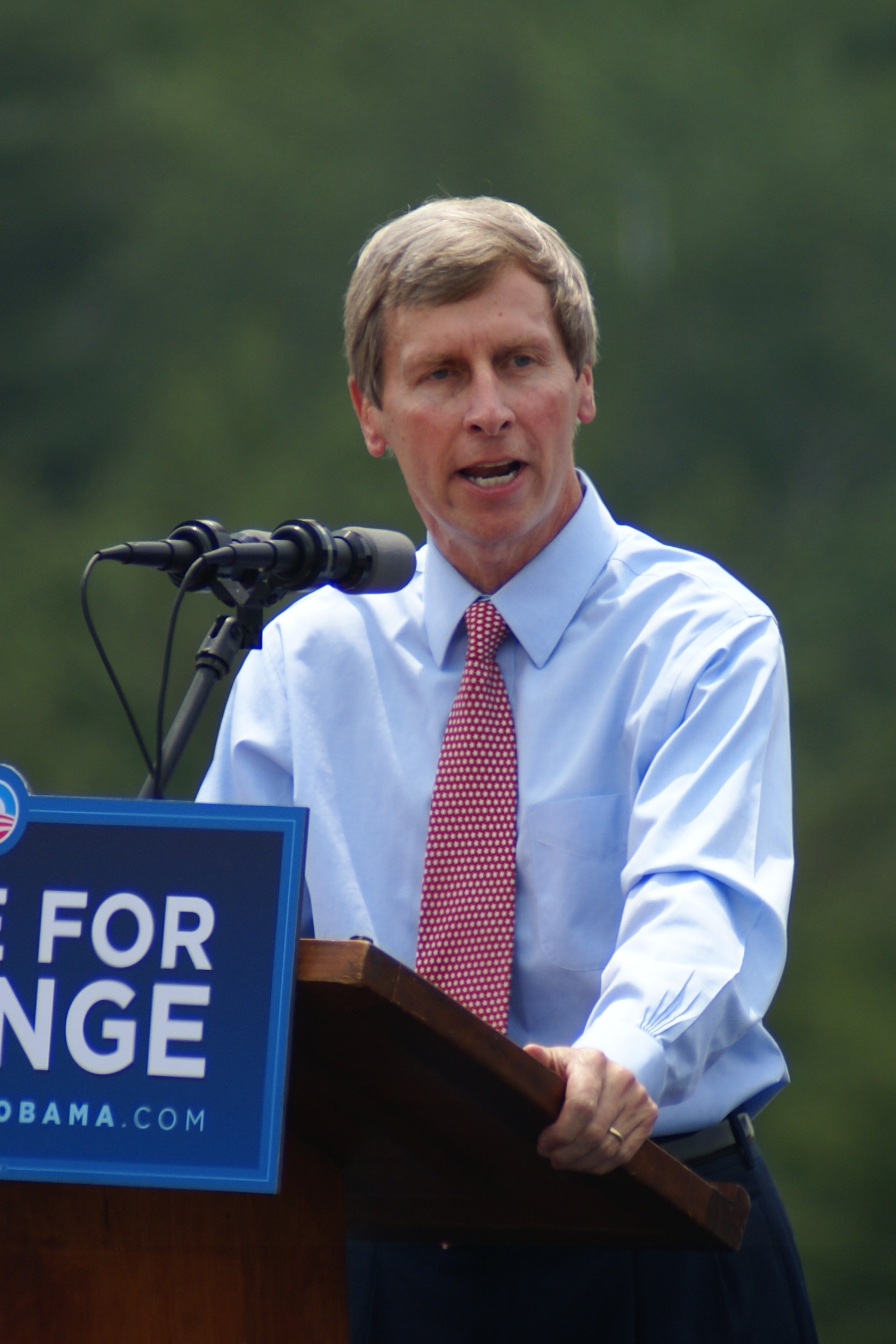
Lynch campaigning for Barack Obama in 2008

In December 2010, the Commission recommended, by a 12 to 10 vote, to retain the death penalty. However, the panel unanimously recommended against expanding it. In 2011, Lynch signed legislation to expand the death penalty to include home invasions.

==== Natural disaster response ====
In April 2006, Lynch was awarded the "National Chairman of Volunteers" Award for Volunteer Excellence by the American Red Cross, due to his leadership during the 2005 floods.

==== Same-sex marriage ====
On June 3, 2009, Lynch signed a same-sex marriage bill into law, despite being personally opposed to gay marriages, making New Hampshire the fifth state in the United States to allow such unions.

=== Historic popularity ===
Throughout his eight year tenure, Lynch enjoyed very high approval ratings, often being ranked among the most popular of U.S. governors. According to the WMUR/Granite State Poll conducted by the University of New Hampshire, just three months after taking office in January 2005, Lynch's approval rating surpassed 50% and stayed upwards of 55% throughout his tenure. Likewise, between February 2006 and February 2009 his approval rating was above 70%. In April 2012, Lynch's approval rating was again above 70% making him the second most popular governor in the United States, behind New York Governor Andrew Cuomo. Lynch enjoyed bipartisan support and is the most popular governor in the state's history.

=== Presidential endorsements ===
During the 2008 Democratic presidential primaries, Lynch was one of eight superdelegates from New Hampshire. Lynch remained neutral during the New Hampshire primary because as governor he needed to "focus on being a good host to the primary", according to a statement by spokesman Colin Manning. At an event on June 27, 2008 in Unity, New Hampshire, Lynch formally endorsed Barack Obama for president.

Lynch endorsed President Barack Obama in the 2012 presidential election, former Secretary of State Hillary Clinton in the 2016 presidential election, and former Vice President Joe Biden in the 2020 presidential election.

== Personal life ==
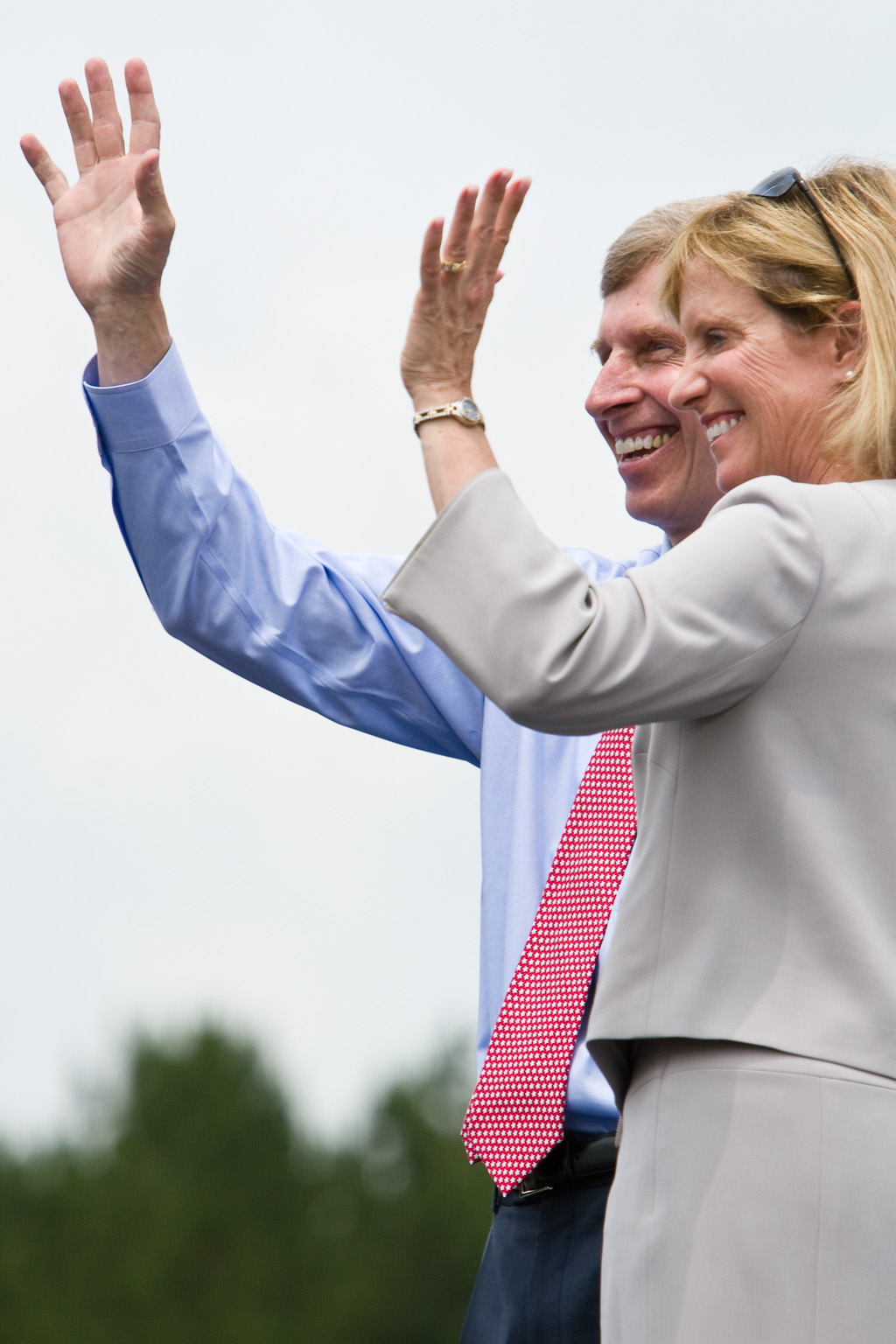
John Lynch and his wife Susan Lynch

Lynch and his wife, Susan Lynch, a pediatrician, have three children.

Party political offices
Preceded by Mark Fernald	Democratic nominee for Governor of New Hampshire; 2004, 2006, 2008, 2010	Succeeded by Maggie Hassan
Political offices
Preceded by Craig Benson	Governor of New Hampshire; 2005–2013	Succeeded by Maggie Hassan
U.S. order of precedence (ceremonial)
Preceded by Craig Benson as Former Governor	Order of precedence of the United States	Succeeded by Chris Sununu as Former Governor
