= 2006 New Hampshire gubernatorial election =

- November 7, 2006
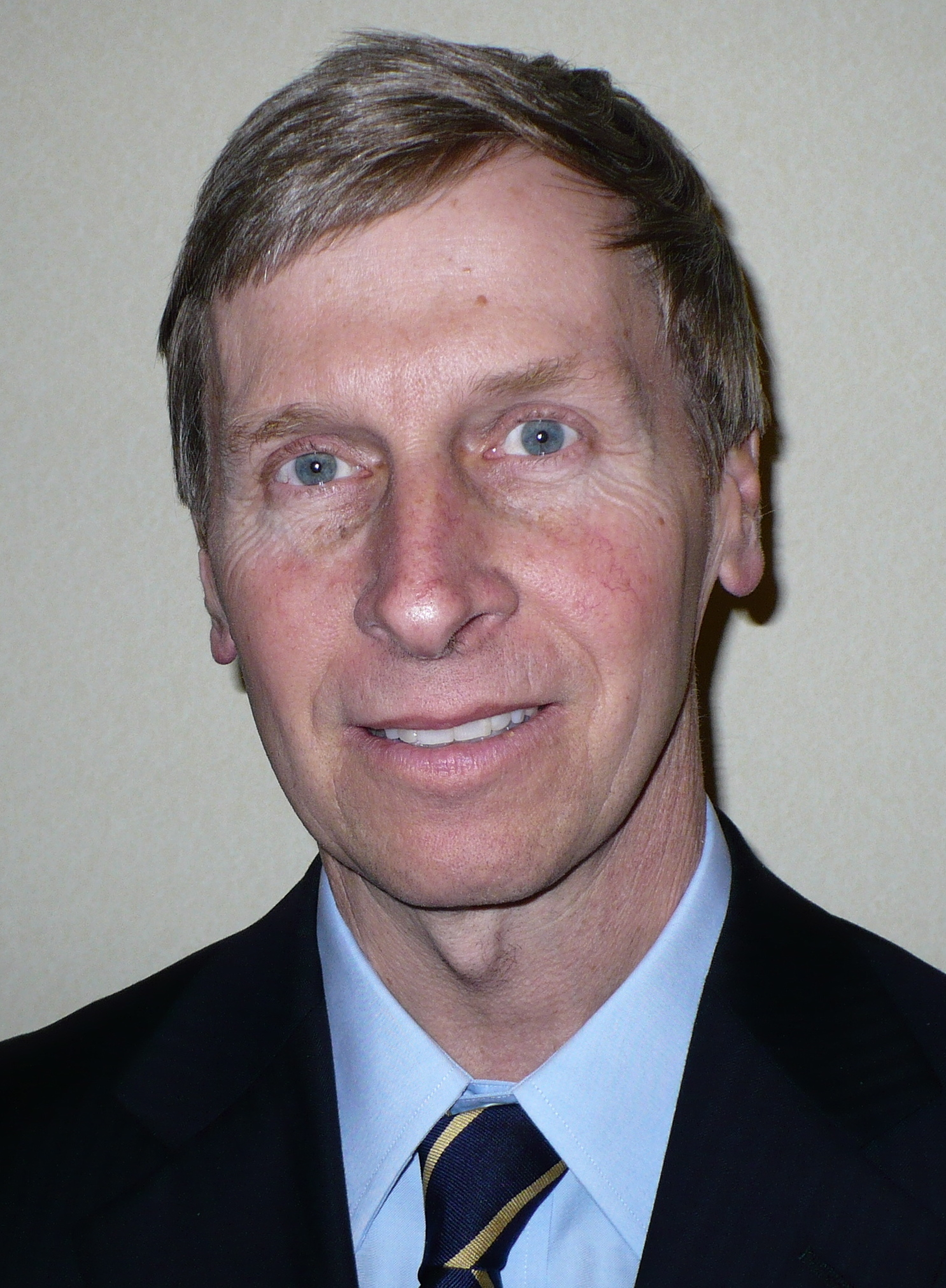

Nominee	John Lynch	Jim Coburn
Party	Democratic	Republican
Popular vote	298,677	104,223
Percentage	74.01%	25.83%
- Lynch: 50–60% 60–70% 70–80% 80–90% >90% Coburn: 50–60%
Governor before election
John Lynch
Democratic
Elected Governor
John Lynch
Democratic

The 2006 New Hampshire gubernatorial election took place on November 7, 2006. Incumbent Democrat John Lynch defeated Republican James B. Coburn and won a second term as Governor of New Hampshire.

== Democratic primary ==
=== Candidates ===
- John Lynch, incumbent Governor of New Hampshire

=== Results ===
Democratic Primary results
Party	Candidate	Votes	%
Democratic	John Lynch (incumbent)	43,442	99.51%
Democratic	Write-ins	214	0.49%
Total votes		43,656	100.00%

== Republican primary ==
=== Candidates ===
- Jim Coburn, New Hampshire State Representative

=== Results ===
Republican primary results
Party	Candidate	Votes	%
Republican	Jim Coburn	30,352	85.40%
Republican	Write-ins	5,190	14.60%
Total votes		35,542	100.00%

== General election ==
=== Predictions ===
Source	Ranking	As of
The Cook Political Report	Solid D	November 6, 2006
Sabato's Crystal Ball	Safe D	November 6, 2006
Rothenberg Political Report	Safe D	November 2, 2006
Real Clear Politics	Safe D	November 6, 2006

=== Polling ===
Poll source	Date(s) administered	John Lynch (D)	Jim Coburn (R)
Survey USA	September 20, 2006	73%	23%

=== Results ===

New Hampshire gubernatorial election, 2006
Party	Candidate	Votes	%	±%
Democratic	John Lynch (incumbent)	298,677	74.01%	+22.99%
Republican	Jim Coburn	104,223	25.83%	−23.04%
Libertarian	Richard Kahn (write-in)	323	0.08%	+0.08%
Write-ins		557	0.08%	
Majority		194,472	48.17%	+46.03%
Turnout		403,680		
Democratic hold		Swing		

==== By county ====
County	John Lynch Democratic		Jim Coburn Republican		Various candidates Other parties		Margin		Total votes cast
County	#	%	#	%	#	%	#	%	Total votes cast
Belknap	15,467	75.3%	5,050	24.6%	21	0.1%	10,417	50.7%	20,538
Carroll	13,403	71.9%	5,225	28.0%	20	0.1%	8,178	43.9%	18,648
Cheshire	20,459	79.3%	5,278	20.5%	49	0.2%	15,181	48.8%	25,786
Coos	7,746	77.7%	2,216	22.2%	11	0.1%	5,530	55.5%	9,973
Grafton	22,452	77.2%	6,573	22.6%	53	0.2%	15,879	54.6%	29,078
Hillsborough	81,222	71.3%	32,478	28.5%	214	0.2%	48,744	42.8%	113,914
Merrimack	39,351	79.0%	10,412	20.9%	78	0.2%	28,939	58.1%	49,841
Rockingham	61,102	69.3%	26,998	30.6%	128	0.1%	34,104	38.7%	88,228
Strafford	27,168	79.9%	6,776	19.9%	42	0.1%	20,392	60.0%	33,986
Sullivan	10,391	75.9%	3,282	24.0%	15	0.1%	7,109	51.9%	13,688
Totals	298,677	74.0%	104,223	25.8%	780	0.2%	194,454	48.2%	403,680

Counties that flipped from Republican to Democratic

- Belknap (largest city: Laconia)
- Carroll (largest municipality: Conway)
- Hillsborough (largest municipality: Manchester)
- Rockingham (largest municipality: Derry)

== See also ==
- U.S. gubernatorial elections, 2006
