= Electoral history of Joe Biden =

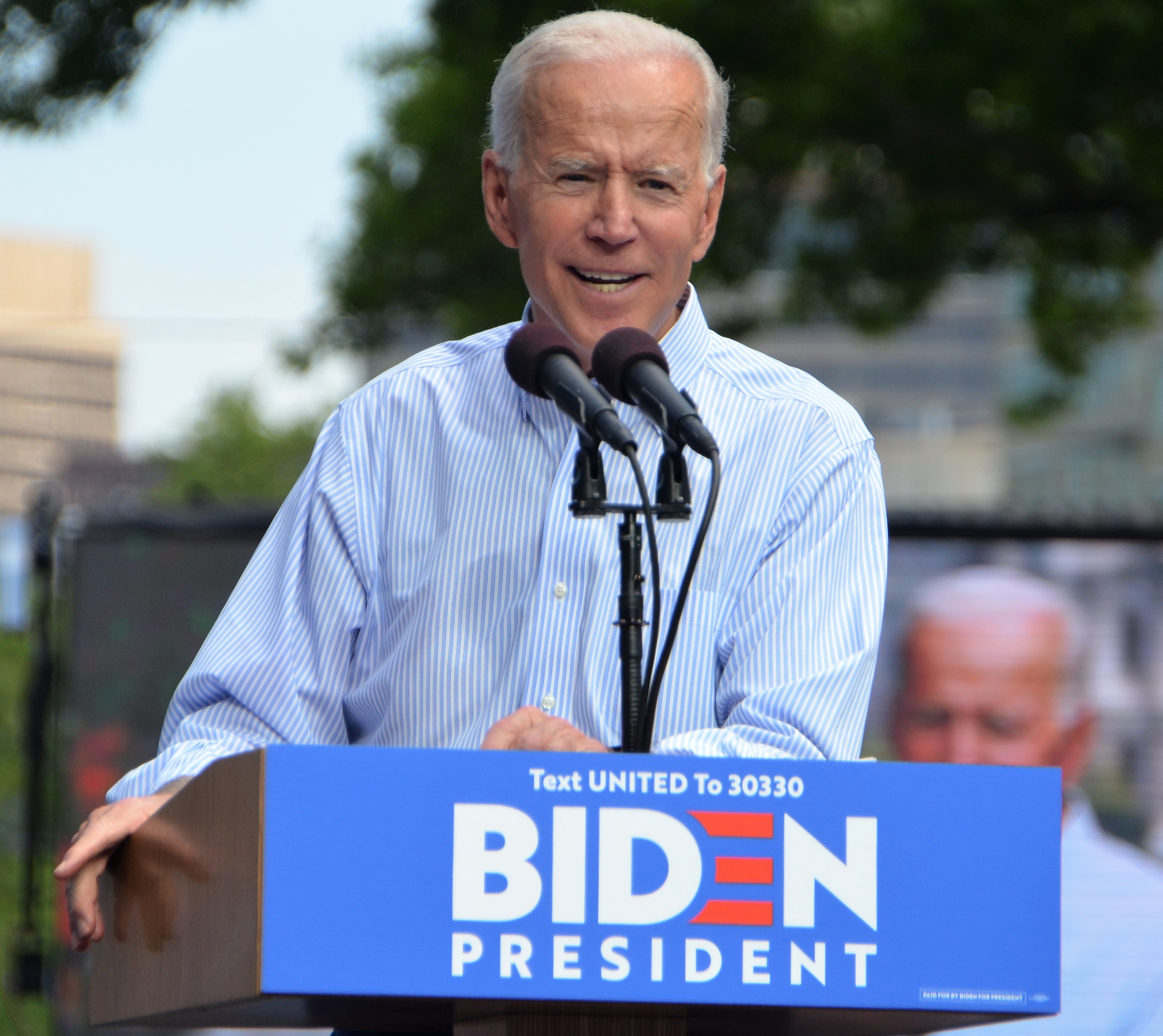
Joe Biden at his presidential primary kick-off rally in Philadelphia, May 2019

Joe Biden, the 46th president of the United States (2021–2025), has run for public office several times, beginning in 1970. He served as the 47th vice president (2009–2017), and as a United States senator from Delaware (1973–2009). Biden is the second oldest person elected president, and the first president from Delaware. He is a member of the Democratic Party, one of two major political parties in the United States.

Biden began his political career in 1970 in New Castle County, Delaware, by unseating incumbent County Councilman Lawrence T. Messick. In 1972, at age 29, he became the seventh-youngest senator in American history when he was elected to the United States Senate in Delaware. Between 1978 and 2008, he won re-election to the Senate six times, before resigning in 2009 to assume the role of Barack Obama's vice president, after they won the 2008 presidential election. They were re-elected to a second term in 2012. All of Biden's senatorial and county council campaigns were managed by his sister, Valerie Biden Owens. Owens also served as campaign manager for his first two presidential campaigns.

Biden announced his candidacy for the 2020 Democratic presidential nomination on April 25, 2019. A total of 29 major candidates declared their candidacies for the primaries, but over time, the field narrowed down to Biden and Vermont senator Bernie Sanders. Following Sanders withdrawing from the race, Biden became the presumptive nominee. He defeated incumbent president Donald Trump in the general election, with 306 electoral votes to Trump's 232. Biden was the first Democrat to win the states of Arizona and Georgia since the 1990s and broke the record for votes cast for a presidential candidate. While he intended to run for re-election in 2024, following calls from various prominent Democrats, he withdrew from the race.

Biden has never lost a general election, though he failed to win the Democratic nomination for president in 1988 and 2008. All three of the winning Democratic presidential tickets of the 21st century had Biden on the ticket, either as president or vice president.

== County council election (1970) ==
Biden's first election was in New Castle County, Delaware, for the fourth district of the New Castle County Council. He unseated Republican incumbent Lawrence T. Messick. At the time of Biden's election, the state's politics were dominated by Republicans. Biden's campaign was managed by his sister, Valerie Biden Owens.

1970 New Castle County Council District 4 election
Party	Candidate	Votes	%
Democratic	Joseph R. Biden, Jr.	10,573	55.41
Republican	Lawrence T. Messick (incumbent)	8,192	42.93
American	Kenneth A. Horner	317	1.66
Total votes		19,082	100.00
Democratic gain from Republican			

== U.S. Senate elections (1972–2008) ==
Biden was elected to the United States Senate seven times between 1972 and 2008. Shortly after beginning his seventh term, he resigned due to being elected vice president. As of January 22, 2025, Biden is the nineteenth longest serving senator of all time, serving slightly over thirty-six years. Additionally he is the longest serving senator from Delaware. His sister Valerie served as campaign manager on all seven of his campaigns.

=== 1972 ===
1972 U.S. Senate map Biden: 50–60% Boggs: 40–50%

After two years on the New Castle County Council, Biden decided to challenge incumbent Republican senator J. Caleb Boggs. Ted Kaufman, who worked on the campaign, recalled that he told Biden, "Joe, I've got to be honest with you; I really don't think you have much of a chance to win this race." The campaign had very little funding, and mostly relied on word-of-mouth marketing. On November 7, 1972, Biden upset Boggs by a margin of 3,162 votes.

Shortly after the election, Biden's wife and children were in a car crash. His wife, Neilia, and daughter, Naomi, died, while his sons, Beau and Hunter, were hospitalized. Following the crash, Biden contemplated suicide and considered not taking his Senate seat. He decided to take the seat after being convinced by Senate Majority Leader Mike Mansfield.

1972 United States Senate election in Delaware
Party	Candidate	Votes	%
Democratic	Joe Biden	116,006	50.48
Republican	J. Caleb Boggs (incumbent)	112,844	49.10
American	Henry Majka	803	0.35
Prohibition	Herbert B. Wood	175	0.08
Total votes		229,828	100.00
Democratic gain from Republican			

=== 1978 ===
1978 U.S. Senate map Biden: 50–60%

On November 7, 1978, Biden was re-elected, defeating Republican challenger James H. Baxter, Jr. Biden greatly improved on his 1972 margin, and won all three counties, flipping Sussex County away from the Republican Party.

1978 United States Senate election in Delaware
Party	Candidate	Votes	%
Democratic	Joe Biden (incumbent)	93,930	57.96
Republican	James H. Baxter Jr.	66,479	41.02
American	Donald G. Gies	1,663	1.03
Total votes		162,072	100.00
Democratic hold			

=== 1984 ===
1984 U.S. Senate map Biden: 50–60% 60–70%

In 1984, Biden won re-election to a third term, defeating Republican challenger Delaware state representative John M. Burris. Biden outperformed Democratic presidential nominee Walter Mondale's performance in the concurrent presidential election. Mondale lost the state to Republican incumbent president Ronald Reagan by over 50 thousand votes and twenty percent of the vote. Biden later stated that he came very close to deciding not to run.

1984 United States Senate election in Delaware
Party	Candidate	Votes	%
Democratic	Joe Biden (incumbent)	147,831	60.11
Republican	John M. Burris	98,101	39.89
Total votes		245,932	100.00
Democratic hold			

=== 1990 ===
1990 U.S. Senate map Biden: 50–60% 60–70%

In 1990, Biden, like most incumbents in the 1990 United States Senate elections, was re-elected, defeating M. Jane Brady, deputy Attorney General of Delaware. Brady decided to run because she felt that Biden's liberal voting record did not reflect the political positions of Delawareans. Brady's campaign raised around $245,000; she was heavily outspent by Biden, who raised around $2,800,000.

1990 United States Senate election in Delaware
Party	Candidate	Votes	%
Democratic	Joe Biden (incumbent)	112,918	62.68
Republican	M. Jane Brady	64,554	35.83
Libertarian	Lee Rosenbaum	2,680	1.49
Write-in		5	0.00
Total votes		180,157	100.00
Democratic hold			

=== 1996 ===
1996 U.S. Senate map Biden: 50–60% 60–70%

In 1996, Biden was re-elected to a fifth term, against Republican Ray Clatworthy. For the first time in his senatorial career, Biden's margin of victory decreased. Despite this, Biden still greatly outperformed Democratic President Bill Clinton in the concurrent presidential election. Clinton received 51 percent of the vote, to Republican Senator Bob Dole's 36.5 percent and Reform candidate Ross Perot's 10.6 percent.

1996 United States Senate election in Delaware
Party	Candidate	Votes	%
Democratic	Joe Biden (incumbent)	165,465	60.04
Republican	Ray Clatworthy	105,088	38.13
Libertarian	Lee Rosenbaum	3,340	1.21
Natural Law	Jacqueline Kossoff	1,698	0.62
Total votes		275,591	100.00
Democratic hold			

=== 2002 ===
2002 U.S. Senate map Biden: 50–60% 60–70% Clatworthy: 50–60%

In 2002, Biden won re-election to another term, again defeating Republican challenger Ray Clatworthy. For the second election in a row, Biden's margin of victory decreased as Clatworthy managed to flip Kent County away from the Democrats. Biden's victory made him the first senator from Delaware to serve six terms in the Senate.

2002 United States Senate election in Delaware
Party	Candidate	Votes	%
Democratic	Joe Biden (incumbent)	135,253	58.22
Republican	Ray Clatworthy	94,793	40.80
Independent Party	Bud Barros	996	0.43
Libertarian	Raymond Buranello	922	0.40
Natural Law	Robert E. Mattson	350	0.15
Total votes		232,314	100.00
Democratic hold			

=== 2008 ===
2008 U.S. Senate map Biden: 50–60% 70–80%

After ending his presidential bid in January 2008, Biden focused instead on running for a seventh term. On August 23, 2008, Democratic Party presidential nominee Barack Obama announced that he had selected Biden to serve as his vice presidential running mate. Under Delaware law, Biden could run simultaneously for both his Senate seat and for vice president, which he decided to do. Within minutes of the polls closing, the election was called for Biden. He was re-elected in a landslide victory against Republican challenger Christine O'Donnell. He again won all three counties, flipping Kent County back to the Democratic party. He slightly outperformed Obama's victory in the state. Due to his and Obama's victory in the concurrent presidential election, Biden resigned from the Senate a few weeks after being sworn in. Long-time Biden advisor Ted Kaufman was appointed to fill the vacancy. Kaufman decided not to run in the 2010 special election. The election was won by Democrat Chris Coons, who served the remainder of Biden's term.

2008 United States Senate election in Delaware
Party	Candidate	Votes	%
Democratic	Joe Biden (incumbent)	257,539	64.69
Republican	Christine O'Donnell	140,595	35.31
Total votes		398,134	100.00
Democratic hold			

== Presidential and vice presidential elections (1984–2024) ==
=== 1984 Democratic primary ===
Despite not running, Biden received one vote at the 1984 Democratic National Convention. Unpledged delegate Keron Kerr cast her vote for Biden because she enjoyed a speech he had given in Maine, her home state, the previous year. The nomination was won by former vice president Walter Mondale, who lost to Republican incumbent Ronald Reagan.

=== 1988 Democratic primary ===
In June 1987, Biden, then in his third Senate term, declared his intentions to run for president. Originally, Biden was regarded as potentially one of the strongest candidates in the field. However, following reports that he had plagiarized a speech by Neil Kinnock, the leader of the British Labour Party, he withdrew before the presidential primaries. The nomination was won by Michael Dukakis, who lost the general election to Republican George H. W. Bush.

=== 2008 ===
==== Presidential primaries ====
On January 31, 2007, Biden again announced his candidacy. However, on January 3, 2008, after finishing in fifth place in the Iowa caucus receiving around one percent of the vote, Biden ended his presidential bid. He declined to make an endorsement and stated he was not interested in the Vice Presidency or a cabinet position.

Excluding penalized contests (Note: The Democratic parties of Florida and Michigan violated Democratic National Committee rules by moving their primaries before February 5, 2008, resulting in a nullification of their primaries, until the DNC Rules and Bylaws Committee voted to restore half their delegates.):

2008 Democratic Party presidential primaries
Candidate	Votes	%
Barack Obama	16,706,853	49.04
Hillary Clinton	16,239,821	47.67
John Edwards	742,010	2.18
Bill Richardson	89,054	0.26
Uncommitted	82,660	0.24
Dennis Kucinich	68,482	0.20
Joe Biden	64,041	0.19
Mike Gravel	27,662	0.08
Christopher Dodd	25,300	0.07
Others	22,556	0.07
Total votes	34,068,439	100.00

Including penalized contests:

2008 Democratic Party presidential primaries
Candidate	Votes	%
Hillary Clinton	18,225,175	48.03
Barack Obama	17,988,182	47.41
John Edwards	1,006,275	2.65
Uncommitted	299,610	2.79
Bill Richardson	106,073	0.28
Dennis Kucinich	103,994	0.27
Joe Biden	81,641	0.22
Others	44,348	0.12
Mike Gravel	40,251	0.11
Christopher Dodd	35,281	0.09
Total votes	37,980,830	100.00

==== Nomination ====
Following Illinois senator Barack Obama's victory in the primaries, Biden, Virginia senator Tim Kaine, and Indiana senator Evan Bayh were shortlisted to be Obama's vice presidential nominee. On August 23, 2008, Obama officially nominated Biden to be his running mate. At the 2008 Democratic National Convention, Biden was selected by acclamation.

2008 Democratic National Convention, vice presidential tally
Party	Candidate	Votes	%
Democratic	Joe Biden	– (Note: Chosen by acclamation)	100.00%
Total votes		–	100.00%

==== General election ====
Electoral College map of the 2008 presidential election

Obama and Biden won the 2008 presidential election, defeating Republican nominees Arizona senator John McCain and Alaska governor Sarah Palin. Biden was elected the 47th Vice President of the United States.

2008 United States presidential election
Candidate	Running mate	Party	Popular vote		Electoral vote	
Candidate	Running mate	Party	Votes	%	Votes	%
Barack Obama	Joe Biden	Democratic	69,498,516	52.91	365	67.84
John McCain	Sarah Palin	Republican	59,948,323	45.64	173	32.16
Ralph Nader	Matt Gonzalez	Independent	739,034	0.56	0	0.00
Bob Barr	Wayne Allyn Root	Libertarian	523,715	0.40	0	0.00
Chuck Baldwin	Darrell Castle	Constitution	199,750	0.15	0	0.00
Cynthia McKinney	Rosa Clemente	Green	161,797	0.12	0	0.00
Others			290,626	0.22	0	0.00
Total			131,361,761	100.00	538	100.00

=== 2012 ===
==== Nomination ====
At the 2012 Democratic National Convention Biden and Obama were re-nominated, Biden was again nominated by acclamation.

2012 Democratic National Convention, vice presidential tally
Party	Candidate	Votes	%
Democratic	Joe Biden	– (Note: Chosen by acclamation)	100.00
Total votes		–	100.00

==== General election ====
Electoral College map of the 2012 presidential election

Obama and Biden won re-election in the 2012 presidential election, defeating the Republican challengers former Massachusetts governor Mitt Romney and Wisconsin representative Paul Ryan.

2012 United States presidential election
Candidate	Running mate	Party	Popular vote		Electoral vote	
Candidate	Running mate	Party	Votes	%	Votes	%
Barack Obama (incumbent)	Joe Biden (incumbent)	Democratic	65,915,795	51.06	332	61.71
Mitt Romney	Paul Ryan	Republican	60,933,504	47.20	206	38.29
Gary Johnson	Jim Gray	Libertarian	1,275,971	0.99	0	0.00
Jill Stein	Cheri Honkala	Green	469,627	0.36	0	0.00
Others			490,513	0.38	0	0.00
Total			129,085,410	100.00	538	100.00

=== 2020 ===
==== Primaries ====
In 2015, the final year of his vice presidency, there was media speculation that he would seek the presidency in the 2016 United States presidential election. Biden denied the rumors, stating that his "window for a successful campaign has closed".

First-instance vote by state and territory Joe Biden Bernie Sanders Michael Bloomberg

Biden announced his candidacy in the 2020 presidential election on April 25, 2019. A total of 29 major candidates declared their candidacies for the primaries, the largest field of presidential candidates for any American political party since 1972. He was initially considered to be among the strongest candidates, though his chances diminished after poor performances in the Iowa caucus and New Hampshire primary. However, he was considered the frontrunner after his wins in the South Carolina primary and on Super Tuesday. Eventually, the field narrowed down to Biden and Vermont Senator Bernie Sanders. Eventually, Sanders withdrew from the race, and Biden became the presumptive Democratic nominee in April 2020, reaching the delegate threshold needed to secure the nomination in June 2020. During the campaign, Biden pledged to select a woman to be his running mate. After his victory Senators Kamala Harris of California and Elizabeth Warren of Massachusetts were seen as the most likely candidates. Biden eventually selected Harris.

2020 Democratic Party presidential primaries
Candidate	Votes	%
Joe Biden	19,076,052	51.79
Bernie Sanders	9,679,213	26.28
Elizabeth Warren	2,831,472	7.69
Michael Bloomberg	2,488,734	6.76
Pete Buttigieg	924,237	2.51
Amy Klobuchar	529,713	1.44
Tulsi Gabbard	273,940	0.74
Tom Steyer	259,792	0.71
Andrew Yang	170,517	0.46
Uncommitted	130,081	0.35
Michael Bennet	63,124	0.17
Julian Castro	37,037	0.10
Others	370,044	1.01
Total votes	36,833,956	100.00

==== Nomination ====
At the 2020 Democratic National Convention, Biden received 75 percent of the delegate vote to Sanders' 24. Five delegates abstained from voting.

2020 Democratic National Convention, presidential tally
Candidate	Votes	%
Joe Biden	3,558	75.48
Bernie Sanders	1,151	24.42
Abstention	5	0.11
Total votes	4,714	100.00

==== General election ====
Electoral College map of the 2020 presidential election

After winning the Democratic nomination, Biden defeated incumbent president Donald Trump in the general election. He received 306 electoral votes to Trump's 232 becoming the 46th President of the United States. He was the first Democrat to win the states of Arizona and Georgia since the 1990s. Biden received more than 81 million votes, the most votes ever cast for a candidate in a U.S. presidential election. Kamala Harris became the first woman to serve as the Vice President of the United States.

2020 United States presidential election
Candidate	Running mate	Party	Popular vote		Electoral vote	
Candidate	Running mate	Party	Votes	%	Votes	%
Joe Biden	Kamala Harris	Democratic	81,268,924	51.31	306	56.88
Donald Trump (incumbent)	Mike Pence (incumbent)	Republican	74,216,154	46.86	232	43.12
Jo Jorgensen	Spike Cohen	Libertarian	1,865,724	1.18	0	0.00
Howie Hawkins	Angela Nicole Walker	Green	405,035	0.26	0	0.00
Others			628,584	0.40	0	0.00
Total			158,384,421	100.00	538	100.00

=== 2024 ===
==== Primaries ====
First-instance vote by state and territory Joe Biden Jason Palmer Primary cancelled

In April 2023, Biden launched a bid for re-election to the presidency. U.S. Representative Dean Phillips unsuccessfully challenged Biden in the 2024 Democratic Party presidential primaries. Biden easily became the "presumptive nominee" of the Democratic Party on March 12, 2024. Biden's only primary contest loss was in the U.S. overseas territory American Samoa against businessman Jason Palmer. The Florida primary was canceled after the Florida Democratic Party only submitted Biden's name to appear on the ballot. The Delaware primary was canceled for the same reason. Biden was awarded the delegates from both states.

2024 Democratic Party presidential primaries
Candidate	Votes	%
Joe Biden (incumbent)	13,931,767	87.26
Uncommitted	694,551	4.35
Dean Phillips	524,867	3.29
Marianne Williamson	461,732	2.89
Armando Perez-Serrato	80,781	0.51
Gabriel Cornejo	69,701	0.44
Stephen Lyons	41,740	0.26
Frank Lozada	36,571	0.23
President R. Boddie	24,773	0.16
Cenk Uygur	20,862	0.13
Jason Palmer	20,360	0.13
Terrisa Bukovinac	18,996	0.12
Others	39,350	0.25
Total votes	15,966,051	100.00

==== Withdrawal ====
Following his poor performance in the first 2024 presidential debate, Democrats such as then-Senate majority leader Chuck Schumer and former speaker of the House Nancy Pelosi called for Biden to exit the race. On July 21, 2024, Biden ultimately withdrew from the race and immediately endorsed Vice President Kamala Harris to replace him in his place as the party's presidential nominee. Her campaign was ultimately unsuccessful and she lost the general election to Donald Trump.
