= 2008 Delaware gubernatorial election =

- November 4, 2008
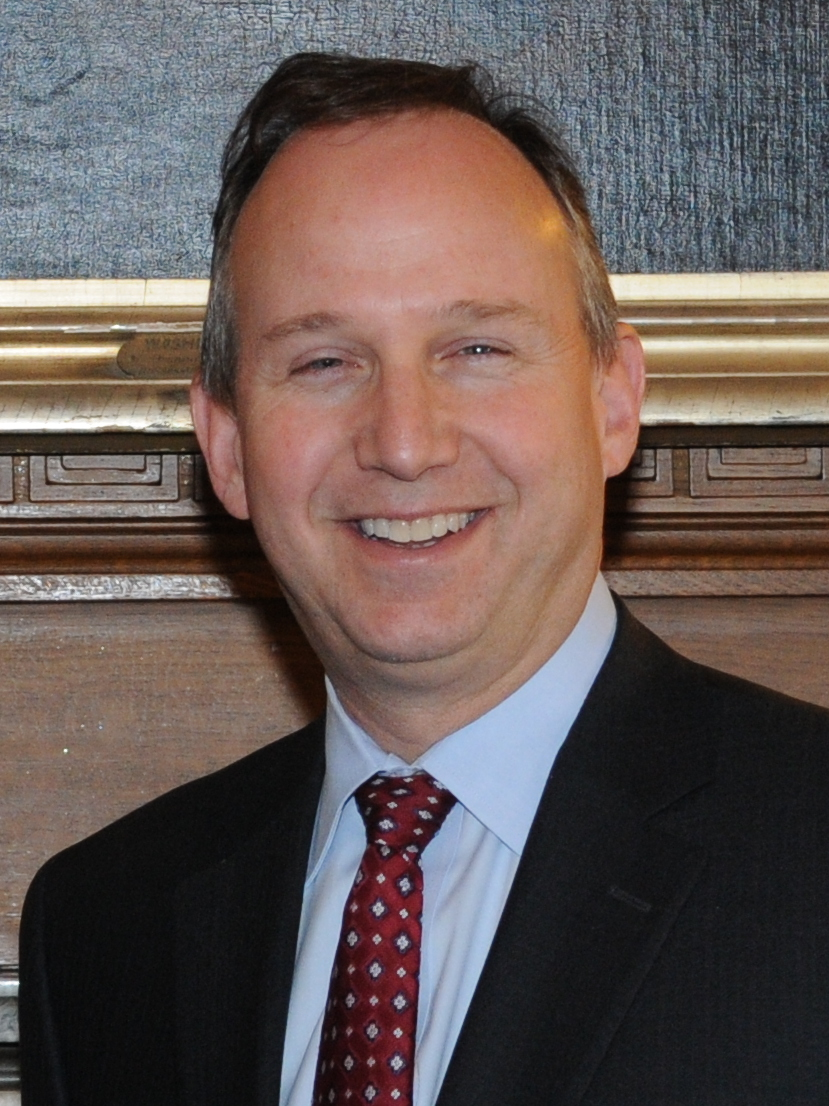

Nominee	Jack Markell	Bill Lee
Party	Democratic	Republican
Popular vote	266,861	126,662
Percentage	67.52%	32.05%
- Markell: 50–60% 60–70% 70–80% 80–90% >90% Lee: 50–60%
Governor before election
Ruth Ann Minner
Democratic
Elected Governor
Jack Markell
Democratic

The 2008 Delaware gubernatorial election was held on November 4, 2008, to elect the governor of Delaware. Democratic state treasurer Jack Markell defeated Republican former justice Bill Lee. Markell succeeded Democratic incumbent Ruth Ann Minner who was ineligible to seek a third term.

As of 2008, Democrats had controlled the Delaware governorship for 16 years. In an upset, state treasurer Markell defeated lieutenant governor John Carney 51%–49% for the Democratic nomination on September 9, when Carney was considered the favorite. The Republican nominee was former state Superior Court Judge Bill Lee, who defeated pilot Michael Protrack. Lee was the Republican nominee for governor in 2004, and lost to Minner by a narrow margin.

The race received more attention with the potential elevation of U.S. senator Joe Biden as Barack Obama's choice as his vice presidential nominee.

== Democratic primary ==
=== Candidates ===
==== Nominee ====
- Jack Markell, Delaware state treasurer

==== Eliminated in primary ====
- John Carney, lieutenant governor of Delaware

=== Results ===
Democratic primary results
Party	Candidate	Votes	%
Democratic	Jack Markell	37,849	51.17%
Democratic	John Carney	36,112	48.83%
Total votes		73,961	100.00%

== Republican primary ==
=== Candidates ===
==== Nomine ====
- Bill Lee, former Delaware Superior Court justice and nominee for governor in 2004

==== Eliminated in primary ====
- Michael Protack, airline pilot

=== Results ===
Republican primary results
Party	Candidate	Votes	%
Republican	Bill Lee	20,826	71.88%
Republican	Michael Protack	8,146	28.12%
Total votes		28,972	100.00%

== Third parties and independents ==
=== Blue Enigma Party ===
==== Candidates ====
- Stephen Michael Annand
- Daniel Rappa Jr.

Nominee

- Jeffrey Brown, bartender and party founder

== General election ==
=== Predictions ===
Source	Ranking	As of
The Cook Political Report	Safe D	October 16, 2008
Rothenberg Political Report	Safe D	November 2, 2008
Sabato's Crystal Ball	Safe D	November 3, 2008
Real Clear Politics	Safe D	November 4, 2008

=== Polling ===
Source	Date	Jack Markell (D)	Bill Lee (R)
Survey USA	October 28, 2008	62%	27%
Rasmussen Reports	October 10, 2008	62%	34%
West Chester University/WHYY	October 9, 2008	61%	30%
Fairleigh Dickinson	September 23, 2008	61%	27%
Survey USA	September 23, 2008	64%	29%

=== Results ===
2008 Delaware gubernatorial election
Party	Candidate	Votes	%	±%
Democratic	Jack Markell	266,861	67.52%	+16.65%
Republican	Bill Lee	126,662	32.05%	−13.74%
Blue Enigma	Jeffrey Brown	1,681	0.43%	
Majority		140,199	35.48%	+30.40%
Total votes		395,204	100.00	
Democratic hold		Swing		

==== By county ====
County	Jack Markell Democratic		William Lee Republican		All Others	
County	#	%	#	%	#	%
Kent	41,076	63.25	23,646	36.41	218	0.34
New Castle	180,240	73.9	62,432	25.6	1,212	0.5
Sussex	45,545	52.73	40,584	46.98	251	0.29
Totals	266,861	67.52	126,662	32.05	1,681	0.43

Counties that flipped from Republican to Democratic

- Kent (largest city: Dover)
- Sussex (largest city: Seaford)

== See also ==
- 2008 United States elections
