= 2000 Delaware gubernatorial election =

- November 7, 2000
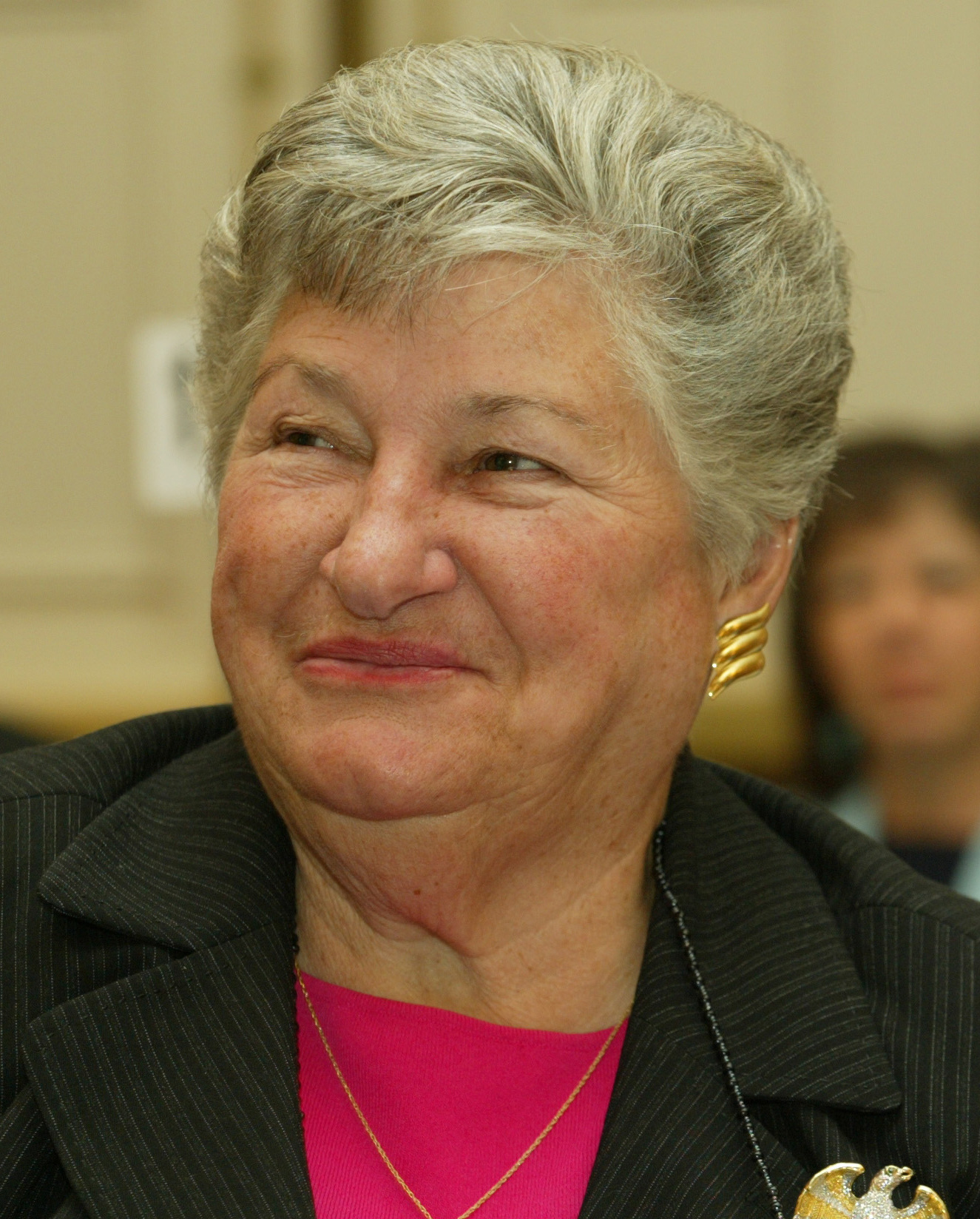

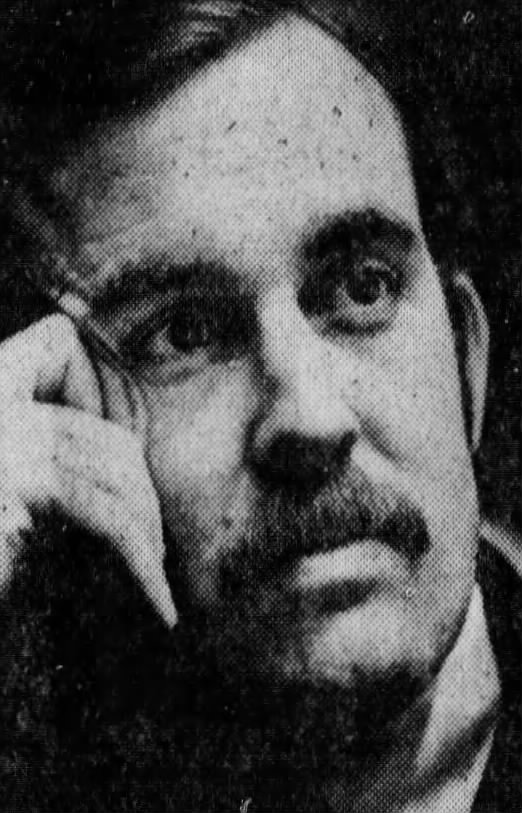
Nominee	Ruth Ann Minner	John M. Burris
Party	Democratic	Republican
Popular vote	191,695	128,603
Percentage	59.24%	39.75%
- Minner: 50–60% 60–70% 70–80% 80–90% Burris: 40–50% 50–60%
Governor before election
Tom Carper
Democratic
Elected Governor
Ruth Ann Minner
Democratic

The 2000 Delaware gubernatorial election was held on November 7, 2000. Democratic incumbent Tom Carper was term-limited and instead ran successfully for the United States Senate. In the open race, Democratic lieutenant governor Ruth Ann Minner defeated John M. Burris in a landslide.

== Democratic primary ==
=== Candidates ===
- Ruth Ann Minner, lieutenant governor of Delaware

=== Results ===
Democratic primary results
Party	Candidate	Votes	%
Democratic	Ruth Ann Minner	38,779	100.00

== Republican primary ==
=== Candidates ===
- John M. Burris, former Delaware Chamber of Commerce president and 1984 U.S. Senate nominee
- Bill Lee, former Delaware Superior Court justice

=== Results ===
Republican primary results
Party	Candidate	Votes	%
Republican	John M. Burris	13,893	50.08
Republican	Bill Lee	13,847	49.92
Total votes		27,740	100.00

== General election ==
=== Candidates ===
- John M. Burris, former Delaware Chamber of Commerce president and 1984 U.S. Senate nominee (Republican)
- Floyd E. McDowell (Independent Party of Delaware)
- Ruth Ann Minner, lieutenant governor of Delaware (Democratic)

=== Debates ===
- Complete video of debate, October 17, 2000
- Complete video of debate, October 23, 2000

=== Polling ===
Poll source	Date(s)	Sample size	Margin of error	Ruth Ann Minner (D)	John Burris (R)	Other / undecided (Note: Calculated by taking the difference of 100% and all other candidates combined.)
Mason-Dixon Polling & Strategy	October 31, 2000	625	—	48%	36%	16%
SurveyUSA	October 24, 2000	500	—	55%	41%	4%

=== Results ===
Delaware gubernatorial election, 2000
Party	Candidate	Votes	%	±%
Democratic	Ruth Ann Minner	191,695	59.24%	−10.25%
Republican	John M. Burris	128,603	39.75%	+9.24%
Independent Party	Floyd E. McDowell	3,271	1.01%	
Majority		63,092	19.50%	−19.49%
Turnout		323,569		
Democratic hold		Swing		

==== By county ====
County	Ruth Ann Minner Democratic		John Burris Republican		Floyd E. McDowell Independent	
County	#	%	#	%	#	%
Kent	27,164	57.08	20,073	42.18	356	0.75
New Castle	127,112	60.28	81,311	38.56	2,462	1.17
Sussex	37,419	57.49	27,219	41.82	453	0.7
Totals	191,695	59.24	128,603	39.75	3,271	1.01
