= Bill Lee (Delaware politician) =

American judge

Personal details
- Born: William Swain Lee; December 18, 1935 (age 90) Philadelphia, Pennsylvania, U.S.
- Party: Republican
- Education: Duke University (BA); University of Pennsylvania (JD)

William Swain Lee (born December 18, 1935) is an American lawyer and Republican politician from Georgetown, in Sussex County, Delaware. He is a member of the Republican Party, who served as a judge of the Delaware Superior Court. He was the 2004 and 2008 Republican nominee for Governor of Delaware.

== Early life and family ==
Lee was born December 18, 1935, son of Dr. Walter H. Lee and Virginia Swain Lee. He attended school in Middletown, Delaware, and graduated from Wilmington Friends School in 1953. He later graduated from Duke University and the University of Pennsylvania Law School, where he earned a J.D. degree in 1960. He went on to serve in the United States Marine Corps. He is the father of two sons and two daughters.

== Judicial career ==
All judges are appointed by the Governor of Delaware. In 1977, Governor Pete du Pont appointed Lee as an Associate Judge in the Delaware Family Court. In 1986, Governor Mike Castle appointed Lee to the Delaware Superior Court, and Resident Judge of Sussex County three years later.

Lee is best known as the presiding judge of the 1998 murder trial of influential lawyer and former gubernatorial chief-of-staff Thomas Capano. Capano had been charged with the 1996 murder of Governor Tom Carper's personal scheduler, Anne Marie Fahey. Capano was a wealthy, well-connected lawyer, known to nearly everyone in Delaware's political community. Fahey, an attractive 30-year-old member of another well-known family, was attempting to end a romantic relationship with the married Capano, when he murdered her and dumped her body in the Atlantic Ocean. The highly publicized case was prosecuted by U.S. Attorney Colm Connolly and resulted in Capano being convicted, and then sentenced to death in 1999. Lee said Capano is a "ruthless murderer who feels compassion for no one and remorse only for the circumstances in which he finds himself. He is a malignant force from whom no one he deems disloyal or adversarial can be secure, even if he is incarcerated for the rest of his life." (Capano's sentence was eventually commuted to life in prison, and he died there in 2011.)

| Office | Type | Location | Elected | Took office | Left office | Notes |
|---|---|---|---|---|---|---|
| Family Court | Judiciary | Georgetown | | 1977 | 1986 | Judge |
| Superior Court | Judiciary | Georgetown | | 1986 | 1999 | Judge |

== Political career ==
Before he became a judge, Lee served as counsel to the Sussex County Republican Committee from 1965 to 1972, when he became general counsel to the Delaware Republican State Committee. From 1973 until 1977 he was the Sussex County Republican Party Chairman. In 1976, he was among the delegates who actively supported Ronald Reagan in his effort to win the Republican nomination for president.

In 1999, Lee resigned his judicial post, and sought the Republican nomination for governor. He faced Delaware State Chamber of Commerce President John M. Burris. Burris, after receiving the endorsement of the state Republican Party, won the primary by 46 votes.

In 2004, Lee again sought the Republican nomination, this time winning the state party's endorsement, and easily winning the Republican primary. Although he was able to run a very competitive campaign, Lee ultimately fell short of defeating the incumbent governor, Ruth Ann Minner, in the general election.

In 2008, Lee was drafted by the Republican Party in Delaware to be their gubernatorial candidate, over his announced opponent, Michael D. Protack. During the 2008 convention for the Delaware Republican Party, Lee received over 80% of the delegate votes in the draft, despite not being present. Lee filed his campaign paperwork on May 9 and announced he will make the run for governor. Along with Charles L. Copeland, the Lieutenant Governor nominee, Lee campaigned across the state. He lost in a landslide to Democratic state treasurer Jack Markell.

== Electoral history ==
| Office | Year | Election | Candidate | Party | Votes | Pct | Opponent | Party | Votes | Pct |
|---|---|---|---|---|---|---|---|---|---|---|
| Governor | 2000 | Primary | William Swain Lee | Republican | 13,847 | 50% | John M. Burris | Republican | 13,893 | 50% |
| Governor | 2004 | Primary | William Swain Lee | Republican | 15,270 | 71% | Michael D. Protack | Republican | 5,108 | 24% |
| Governor | 2004 | General | William Swain Lee | Republican | 167,115 | 46% | Ruth Ann Minner | Democratic | 185,687 | 51% |
| Governor | 2008 | General | William Swain Lee | Republican | 126,660 | 32% | Jack Markell | Democratic | 266,858 | 67.5% |

== Additional resources ==
- And Never Let Her Go: Thomas Capano: The Deadly Seducer by Ann Rule
- Fatal Embrace: The Inside Story Of The Thomas Capano/Anne Marie Fahey Murder Case (St. Martin's True Crime Library.) by Cris Barrish

Party political offices
| Preceded by John M. Burris | Republican nominee for Governor of Delaware; 2004, 2008 | Succeeded by Jeff Cragg |
