= Fibro (disambiguation) =

Fibro may refer to:

- A nickname for asbestos cement
- A nickname for fibre cement
- A trade name of a viscose fibre made by Courtaulds
- Short for fibromyalgia, a medical condition
- Fibro System AB, Swedish test equipment company
