= Jack Markell =

American politician and diplomat (born 1960)

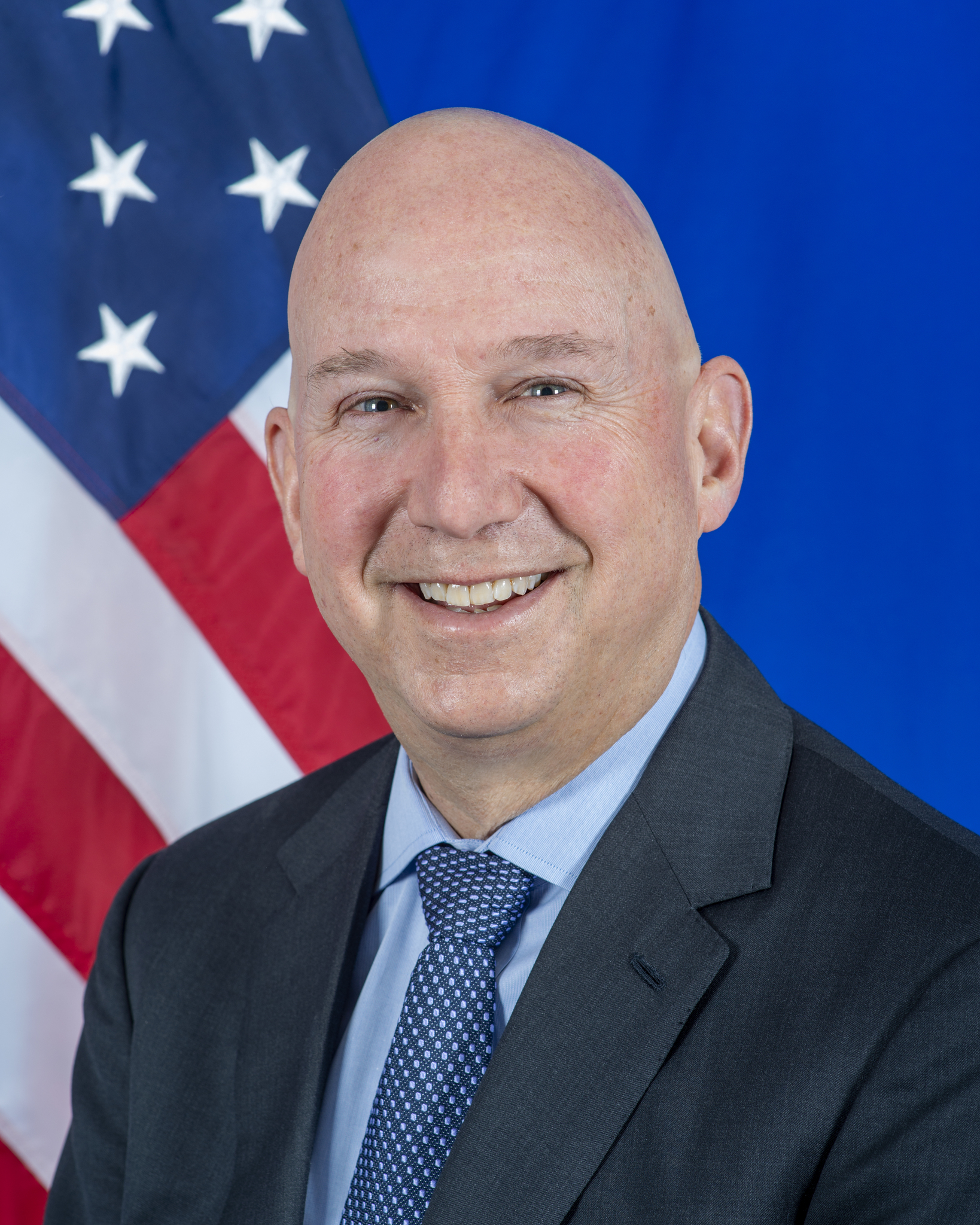
- Official portrait, 2023

United States Ambassador to Italy and San Marino
- In office September 23, 2023 – January 11, 2025
- President: Joe Biden
- Preceded by: Lewis Eisenberg
- Succeeded by: Tilman Fertitta

United States Ambassador to the OECD
- In office February 11, 2022 – August 21, 2023
- President: Joe Biden
- Preceded by: Daniel Yohannes (2017)
- Succeeded by: Sean Patrick Maloney

Chair of the National Governors Association
- In office July 15, 2012 – August 4, 2013
- Preceded by: Dave Heineman
- Succeeded by: Mary Fallin

73rd Governor of Delaware
- In office January 20, 2009 – January 17, 2017
- Lieutenant: Matthew Denn (2009-2014) Vacant (2015-2016)
- Preceded by: Ruth Ann Minner
- Succeeded by: John Carney

Treasurer of Delaware
- In office January 16, 1999 – January 20, 2009
- Governor: Tom Carper; Ruth Ann Minner
- Preceded by: Janet Rzewnicki
- Succeeded by: Velda Jones-Potter

Personal details
- Born: Jack Alan Markell; November 26, 1960 (age 65) Newark, Delaware, U.S.
- Party: Democratic
- Spouse: Carla Smathers
- Children: 2
- Education: Brown University (BA); University of Chicago (MBA)

Jack Alan Markell (born November 26, 1960) is an American politician and diplomat. He had served the United States ambassador both to Italy and to San Marino. He had served as the United States ambassador to the Organisation for Economic Co-operation and Development. As a member of the Democratic Party, he previously served as the 73rd governor of Delaware from 2009 to 2017.

Markell served three terms as the state treasurer of Delaware from 1999 to 2009. After term-limited Governor Ruth Ann Minner was prevented from running for reelection, Markell announced his intention to run. He defeated lieutenant governor of Delaware John Carney with 51% of the vote in the Democratic primary, and defeated the Republican nominee, former Delaware Superior Court judge Bill Lee, with 67% of the vote in the 2008 general election, becoming Delaware's first Jewish governor. Markell won reelection in 2012 by a margin of over 40%.

On May 12, 2023, President Joe Biden nominated Markell to serve as the United States ambassador to Italy and San Marino, serving until the end of the administration. He was confirmed by the Senate on July 27, 2023.

== Early life and education ==
Markell was born and raised in Newark, Delaware, the son of Elaine "Leni", a social worker, and William Markell, who taught accounting at the University of Delaware. He graduated from Newark High School. As a child, he attended Camp Galil, a summer camp in the Labor Zionist youth movement, Habonim Dror. He graduated from Brown University earning his Bachelor of Arts in economics and development studies, and went on to the University of Chicago Booth School of Business, earning his Master of Business Administration (MBA).

== Early career ==
Markell began his business career in 1982, working as a banker at First Chicago Corporation. He then became a consultant at McKinsey & Company in 1986. Markell joined Fleet Call – later known as Nextel Communications (a name that Markell coined) – where he served as the senior vice president for corporate development from 1989 to 1995. Becoming the company's 13th employee, Markell joined Nextel when the company was in a nascent stage; helping lead Nextel to nationwide success during the wireless telecommunications revolution of the 1990s. After leaving Nextel, Markell worked as a senior manager at Comcast Corporation from 1996 to 1998.

== Delaware state treasurer ==
Markell was first elected state treasurer of Delaware in 1998, unseating four-term Republican incumbent Janet Rzewnicki, and was re-elected in 2002 and 2006.

As treasurer, Markell led the development of several educational efforts in personal financial management, known collectively as "the Financial Literacy initiatives". He created the "Delaware Money School", which offers free classes to Delaware residents on topics such as saving for college and retirement planning. He also started the "Delaware Bank at School Program" which takes banks and financial education to schools. He partnered with the University of Delaware, Center for Economic Education and Entrepreneurship, as well as several Delaware banks, to teach young people the basics of money and savings.

In 2001, Governor Ruth Ann Minner chose Markell to chair the information services task force, which developed and implemented recommendations to modify the state's management of information technology. In 2002, he led an effort to streamline and coordinate the procurement of goods and services while using state-of-the-art purchasing techniques. He also led the "Health Rewards" initiative, which offers Delaware state government employees comprehensive physical assessments, detailed statistics about how their health compares with their peers across the country, and recommendations about how they can improve their health.

== Delaware governor ==
=== Elections ===
==== 2008 ====
On June 6, 2007, Markell officially launched his candidacy for governor of Delaware, setting up a primary with lieutenant governor John Carney. Beginning in the summer of 2007, Markell released fourteen policy papers on issues ranging from energy to health care to education. Early, Markell was far behind in polls and endorsements; the Young Democrats Movement and other organizations allowed Markell to gain early momentum, but these efforts were offset by the endorsement of Carney by the Delaware Democratic Party. Markell closed in the polls slowly until election day when Carney still held a small lead.

Markell won an upset victory over Carney, with 51.2% of the vote in the Democratic primary. Against former judge Bill Lee, who also had been the Republican nominee for governor in 2004, Markell won the general election with 67% of the vote.

==== 2012 ====
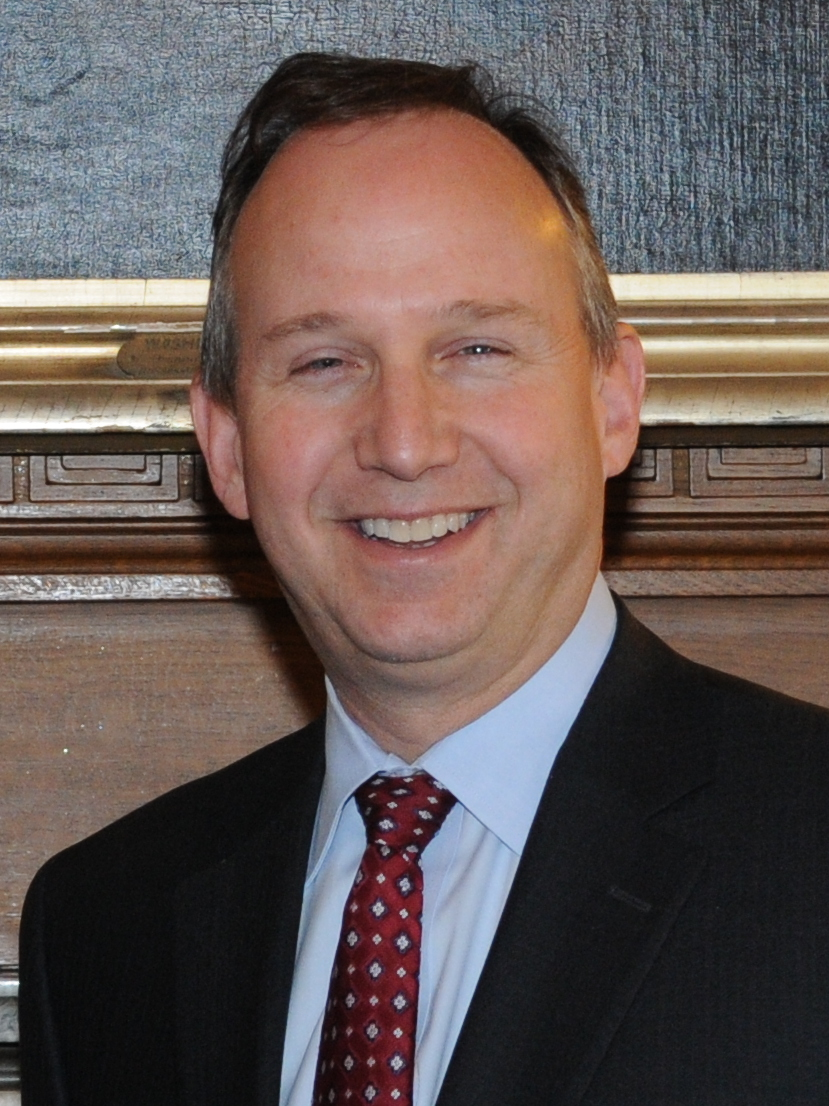
Markell in February 2012

Markell won a second term on November 6, 2012, defeating Republican challenger Jeff Cragg by nearly 40 points.

=== First term ===
Inauguration

According to The News Journal, Markell's 2009 inauguration ceremony was held in the middle of the night to comply with the requirements of the state constitution that the governor be inaugurated on the third Tuesday of January and to allow Delaware residents to enjoy the historic event that would occur later that day: the inauguration of President Barack Obama and his vice president, Delaware's Joe Biden. A traditional swearing-in ceremony was held the following day on Legislative Mall in Dover, Delaware.

Budget

Markell entered office with an unprecedented budget challenge, facing a deficit of almost $800,000,000. One of his first actions was to cut his own salary by 20%. Markell announced his plan to balance the budget in March 2009. Avoiding lay-offs, Markell's plan included an 8% pay cut for state employees, legalization and taxation of sports betting, over $200 million worth of cuts, and revenue enhancements on such things as liquor and tobacco.

After failing to obtain an initial majority in the House of Representatives, Markell's sports betting proposal was approved on a second vote in May 2009. Legislation legalizing sports betting was quickly approved by the state senate, and signed into law by the governor. Initial estimates of revenue for the state from sports betting were between 50 and 60 million dollars. Current revenues estimates are lower following a decision by the U.S. Third Circuit Court of Appeals banning single game bets.

Following late night budget negotiations at Legislative Hall, a compromise budget was passed by the General Assembly and signed at 4 AM on July 1, avoiding a budget crisis and government shut down. Several states in similar circumstances were unable to meet their budget deadlines and were forced to cut or close down many government offices and programs.

The FY 2011 budget focuses on job creation and economic development, counteracted by a reduction in the number of state employees. Compared to the 2009 budget, the new budget is $50 million less and includes 1,026 fewer state positions.

Environment

Following through on several campaign promises early in his term, Markell signed energy legislation aimed to reduce Delaware's energy consumption by 15% by 2015, updating building codes, and mandating that renewable energy be considered first when expanding supplies. Markell also creates a new recycling program which would require both public and private waste collectors to offer curbside recycling pickups at least once every other week and provide containers. "The recycling bill was the home run of the year." said state Senator David McBride. A new clean energy bill will require utilities to rely on clean energy for 25% of their energy. This law also promotes shared solar installations and supports smaller green-energy projects.

LGBT rights

On July 2, 2009, Markell signed legislation banning discrimination based on sexual orientation in housing, insurance, public accommodations and employment, ending a ten-year battle. On May 11, 2011, Markell also signed a civil union bill, which became effective on January 1, 2012.

Education

Markell proposed and signed major educational reform initiatives, including abolishing the controversial Delaware Student Testing Program, establishing a pilot program to reward improving schools, and passing legislation to improve transparency and autonomy within school districts.

Markell facilitated the acquisition of the Newark Chrysler plant by the University of Delaware (UD) to build a research and technology campus that may generate both employment and local innovation. UD President Patrick Harker stated: "Our goal over time is to construct high performance facilities that support the University's Climate Action Plan and restore portions of the land and natural features."

In March 2010, Delaware placed first out of the 16 finalists in the federal government's grant competition for innovative education reform, making the state eligible to receive as much as $119 million. The money received will be used to identify and better Delaware's low-performing schools, improve the system for evaluating students, and raise the standard for and improve the quality of the state's educators.

State economy

In addition to reduced state revenue, the current economic environment has driven rising unemployment. In response, Markell initiated several economic development initiatives, including the LIFT Program, meant to ensure the survival and growth of small businesses.

Following the closure of the GM plant in July 2009, Markell and his team pursued Fisker Automotive. Although in competition with several other states, a deal was signed to reopen the facility after just over two months of negotiations. Fisker will invest a minimum of US$175 million in upgrading the plant. Production of hybrid sedans will begin as early as 2011 for the domestic market as well as for export through the Port of Wilmington. Fisker anticipates that the process will create approximately 2,500 jobs and contribute to Delaware's effort to compete in the "green economy."

In 2010, when Valero announced that they were closing their Delaware City Refinery, Markell aided in the negotiations with Valero, allowing PBF Energy to purchase the refinery. The refinery became operational in 2011, and Markell and PBF agreed that the company would receive economic development incentives in exchange for providing 600 full-time jobs.

Sallie Mae, one of the nation's largest providers of student loans, decided to relocate its headquarters to Delaware. The company expects to hire as many as 1,500 Delawareans over the next five years. Thanks to the Delaware Strategic Fund, a state program that can provide economic incentives to companies thinking of moving to Delaware, Markell and his economic development team have also succeeded in attracting businesses such as Sanosil International and Testing Machines Inc.

In June 2010, Markell signed into law the Business Finder's Fee Tax Credit or "BFF", which provides incentives for companies that bring new jobs to the state. "The BFF program will make us more effective and efficient by enlisting Delawareans across the state to search for more opportunities to create jobs," said Markell.

=== Second term ===
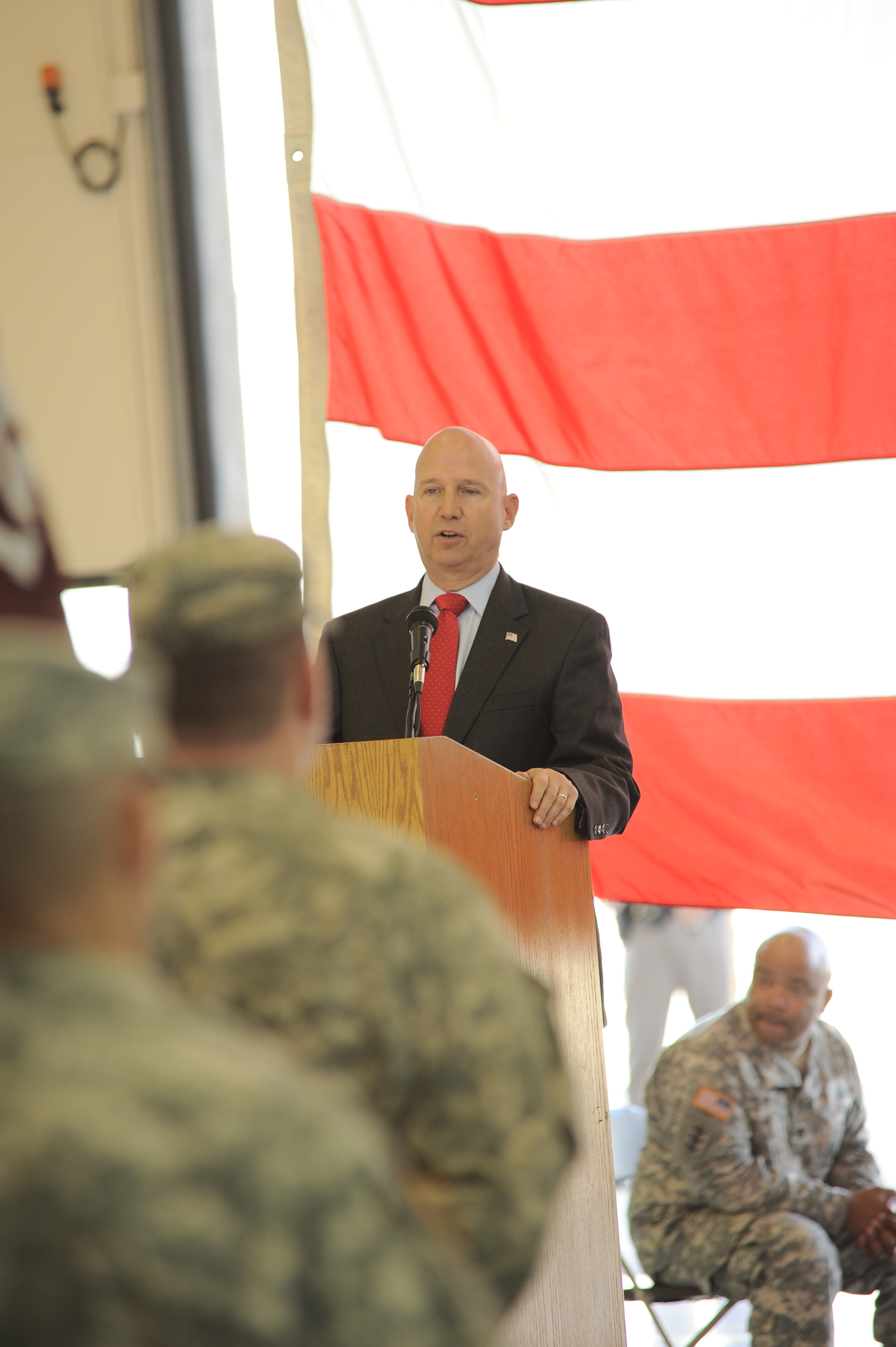
Markell speaks at a troops welcome home ceremony in 2015

Budget and economy

As in Markell's first term, the slow national economic recovery left Delaware with a budget shortfall. In order to sign a constitutionally mandated balanced budget, Markell proposed a budget for fiscal year 2014 that included an extension of some 2009 revenue enhancements. While his budget extended previous tax increases, he also proposed to decrease tax rates where possible. He signed bills extending the tax rates in March 2013 and a full budget on July 1, 2013.

Facing a $139-million budget shortfall for 2015, Markell's proposed budget included a series of targeted tax increases and spending cuts. Markell's budget called for increases in taxes on LLC (Limited Liability Corporations) formation and the state's minimum corporate franchise tax. In an effort to boost jobs and improve the state's infrastructure, Markell also presented a $500- million transportation infrastructure initiative to be paid for by a 10-cent increase in the state's gas tax.

LGBT rights

On May 7, 2013, Markell signed legislation legalizing same-sex marriage in Delaware, making Delaware the eleventh state in the nation to expand marriage rights to same-sex couples. A little over one month later, Markell signed legislation banning discrimination in employment, housing, insurance, public accommodations, and public works for transgender individuals.

Campaign finance

Following a legislative task force on election laws and a campaign finance report issued by special prosecutor Norman Veasey, Markell joined with nearly two dozen legislators to introduce a series of six bills to combat corruption and strengthen state campaign finance laws. The bills, among other goals, would enhance investigative powers for election officials, expand disclosure requirements, and protect "whistleblowers" seeking to expose campaign finance violations.

Gun control

Responding to a renewed national dialogue surrounding pervasive gun violence following the shooting at Sandy Hook Elementary School, Markell joined with Attorney General Beau Biden to introduce a series of five bills designed to curb gun violence. The proposals included requirements for reporting stolen or lost guns, a ban on certain assault weapons and high capacity magazine, universal background checks, new safeguards against licensing firearms to individuals with serious mental health issues, and a ban on firearms within 1000 feet of a school.

Not all of Markell's proposals passed the state legislature during the 2013 session. By July 2013, Markell had signed legislation on lost or stolen firearms and universal background checks. Legislation preventing firearms from being legally sold to individuals with serious mental illness failed in the state senate, despite the NRA remaining neutral and the House passing the same legislation by a vote of 40 to 1.

Environment

In March 2014, Markell proposed an $800-million effort to clean Delaware's long-neglected waterways. Announcing the new initiative, Markell said, ""Somebody has to do this [...] We have a fundamental responsibility, I believe, to leave the next generation cleaner water – water you can fish in, water you can swim in, not as many problems with drinking water, not as many problems with stormwater and all that flooding. ... It's just not acceptable and it's embarrassing." Markell proposes to pay for the new initiative through a series of loans and a small tax on water usage by homeowners, which would average around $45 a year.

Minimum wage

Heading President Barack Obama's call for an increase in the minimum wage, Markell signed legislation increasing Delaware's minimum wage to $8.25 an hour in March 2014. The increase boosts wages for 40,000 Delawareans, or roughly 10% of the state's workforce.

Education

Markell's World Language Expansion Initiative created language immersion programs at the elementary school level in either Mandarin or Spanish for Delaware children in grades K–8. By 2022, it is expected that 10,000 students will participate. In recognition of this accomplishment and of his support for world language and culture learning, Markell received the Foreign Language Advocacy Award from the Northeast Conference on the Teaching of Foreign Languages in 2013. In August 2014, Markell signed House Bill 340 that requires school to have updated plans for a variety of emergency situations. The bill was considered a part of the governor's "state-of-the-art school safety plan" by the end of 2014 pledge.

=== Campaign finance violations ===
In December 2013, following a lengthy investigation, special prosecutor E. Norman Veasey released a 101-page report that found that some campaign donors contributed in excess of the legal limits to several state campaigns, including Markell's 2008 race. The report found that personal emails from Markell to several of his contributors advised them on the parameters of the campaign laws, information that the donors later used to donate beyond the legal limit. Special prosecutor Veasey released evidence that even when presented with information from donors that would identify their ownership in a business as being beyond the allowable limit for multiple donations, Markell and his campaign accepted funds above and beyond legal limits. The information that revealed that the donors were exceeding the allowable limit, however, was provided to the Markell campaign, along with the donations, in a column on a spreadsheet that was viewable only by using "formatting features on the spreadsheet software." Special prosecutor Veasey did not press charges against elected officials as the statute of limitations had expired and they found "no credible evidence" that Markell's campaign had intentionally broken the law; however, multiple donors had previously pleaded guilty for their participation.

=== Presidential politics ===
After being elected by a large margin in 2008, Markell served as chairman of the Democratic Governors Association and the National Governors Association, before being re-elected by an even larger margin of over 40%. This record-setting margin and his overall national profile led some to believe that he wanted to seek the Democratic nomination in 2016, though he did not run. Although Markell expressed interest, he also said that he would support Joe Biden if he were to run.

== Post-governorship ==
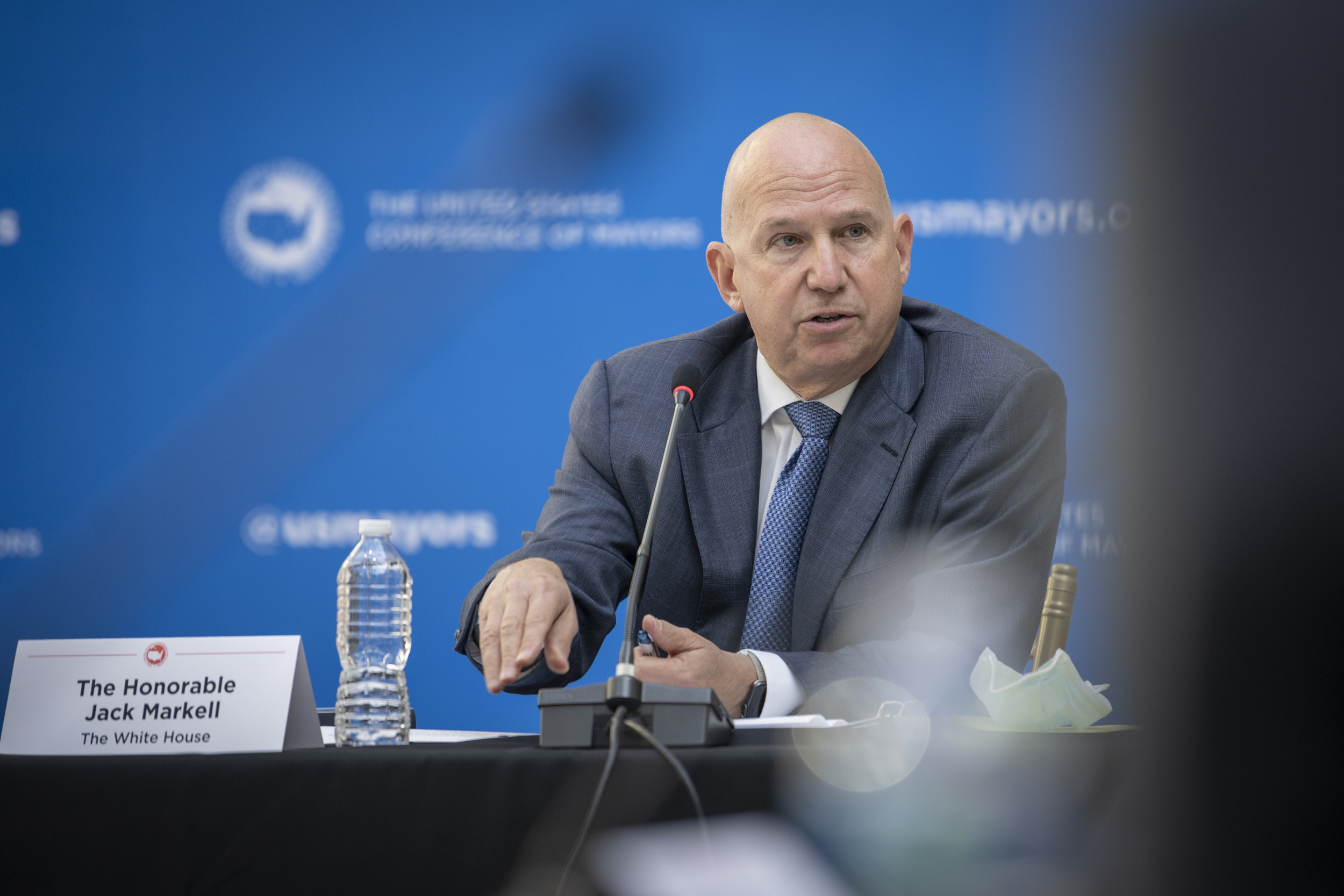
Markell as White House coordinator for Operation Allies Welcome in October 2021

=== JAM Trail ===
In 2018, the Jack A. Markell (JAM) bike trail was dedicated to Markell, a 5.5 mile route built on an abandoned railroad line. The trail connects the Wilmington Riverfront with New Castle's Battery Park. The trail features off-road boardwalks and bridges, paved pathways, benches, a bike repair station, and scenic views of the Christina River's tidal marshes. The trail is included as part of the East Coast Greenway.

=== Operation Allies Refuge ===
During the evacuation of Afghan civilians as part of Operation Allies Refuge in 2021, Markell was named White House coordinator for Operation Allies Welcome, a civilian-led program to assist refugee resettlement in the United States.

=== Ambassador to OECD ===
On June 23, 2021, President Joe Biden nominated Markell to serve as the United States ambassador to the Organisation for Economic Co-operation and Development. Hearings on his nomination were held before the Senate Foreign Relations Committee on September 28, 2021. The committee favorably reported his nomination to the Senate floor on October 19, 2021. On December 18, 2021, Markell was confirmed by the United States Senate to serve as the United States ambassador to the Organisation for Economic Co-operation and Development via voice vote.

Markell was sworn in on January 14, 2022, and presented his credentials to OECD Secretary General Mathias Cormann on February 11, 2022.

=== Ambassador to Italy ===
On May 12, 2023, President Biden nominated Markell to be the US ambassador to Italy and San Marino. Hearings on his nomination were held before the Senate Foreign Relations Committee on June 21, 2023. The committee favorably reported his nomination on July 13, 2023. It was confirmed by the full United States Senate on July 27, 2023 via voice vote. Markell presented his credentials to the President of Italy Sergio Mattarella on September 23, 2023.

== Personal life ==
Markell is married to Carla Smathers, with whom he has two children. On November 16, 2013, Markell and his wife performed A. R. Gurney's play Love Letters at a fundraiser for the Delaware Theater Company in Wilmington, Delaware.

== Electoral history ==
Treasurer of Delaware

1998 treasurer of Delaware election
Party	Candidate	Votes	%	±%
Democratic	Jack Markell	103,407	58	–
Republican	Janet Rzewnicki	74,633	42	–

2002 treasurer of Delaware election
Party	Candidate	Votes	%	±%
Democratic	Jack Markell (inc.)	147,390	66	+8
Republican	Ronald G. Poliquin	75,344	34	−8

2006 treasurer of Delaware election
Party	Candidate	Votes	%	±%
Democratic	Jack Markell (inc.)	147,382	70.5	+4.5
Republican	Esthelda R. Parker-Selby	73,003	29.5	−4.5

Governor of Delaware

Democratic primary for the 2008 Delaware gubernatorial election
Party	Candidate	Votes	%	±%
Democratic	Jack Markell	37,849	51.2	–
Democratic	John Carney	36,112	48.8	–

2008 Delaware gubernatorial election
Party	Candidate	Votes	%	±%
Democratic	Jack Markell	266,858	67.5	+16.3
Republican	Bill Lee	126,660	32	–

2012 Delaware gubernatorial election
Party	Candidate	Votes	%	±%
Democratic	Jack Markell (inc.)	275,991	69.1	+1.6
Republican	Jeff Cragg	113,792	28.6	−3.4

Political offices
Preceded by Janet Rzewnicki	Treasurer of Delaware; 1999–2009	Succeeded by Velda Jones-Potter
Preceded by Ruth Ann Minner	Governor of Delaware; 2009–2017	Succeeded by John Carney
Preceded by Dave Heineman	Chair of the National Governors Association; 2012–2013	Succeeded by Mary Fallin
Party political offices
Preceded by Ruth Ann Minner	Democratic nominee for Governor of Delaware; 2008, 2012	Succeeded by John Carney
Preceded by Brian Schweitzer	Chair of the Democratic Governors Association; 2009–2010	Succeeded by Martin O'Malley
Diplomatic posts
Preceded by Daniel Yohannes	United States Ambassador to the OECD; 2022–2023	Succeeded by Sean Patrick Maloney
Preceded by Lewis Eisenberg	United States Ambassador to Italy; 2023–2025	Succeeded by Tilman Fertitta
Preceded by Lewis Eisenberg	United States Ambassador to San Marino; 2023–2025	Succeeded by Tilman Fertitta
Order of precedence
Preceded by Martha McSally as Former Senator	Order of precedence of the United States	Succeeded by John Carney as Former Governor
