= Camp Galil =

Jewish summer camp in Pennsylvania, US

Habonim Dror Camp Galil is a North American summer camp for Jews in Ottsville, Bucks County, Pennsylvania, about 30 miles north of Philadelphia. It runs for seven weeks during the summer and hosts several seminars during the year.

== History ==
Camp Galil was founded on its current Bucks County site in 1946 as part of Habonim, a Labor Zionist youth movement. Its name refers to the famously scenic area of northern Israel surrounding the Sea of Galilee. Prior to and during the 1947–1949 Palestine war, Galil used its resources to help the war effort on the Israeli side by holding weapons in its barn. As the new Jewish state emerged, Galil trained and educated many of its members to visit Israel and eventually make Aliyah (literally to "go up”), or move to the Land of Israel. Galilniks, along with other members of Habonim, helped found and build several kibbutzim (socialist farming communities) all over Israel, including Gesher Haziv, Urim, and others.

Since that time, Galil has focused more on its summer camp and year-round programming. Its slogan is "the spirit of kibbutz...close to home!" emphasizing the community-minded values of the kibbutz movement, but in an American Jewish context. The main goal of Galil today is to teach young people to be Jewish leaders in their own communities.

== Galil today ==
Galil is a very active machaneh (camp), both as part of HDNA and as part of the Philadelphia Jewish community.

=== Summer Camp ===
Galil runs a seven-week summer camp every year which is split into two sessions. First session is four weeks long and runs from late June to mid July. Second session is three weeks long and runs from mid July to early August. Each session has about 130-160 chanichim (campers), with second session usually having fewer chanichim than first. Younger, first-year, chanichim can also opt to come for only two weeks and then extend their stay.

In 2010, Galil introduced a new program called "Taste of Galil" for campers finishing second grade only. They spend four days in a one-on-one setting with their counselors and the other campers their age.

=== During the year ===
Though the summer camp only runs for seven weeks, Galil remains active year-round! During the rest of the year, Eizor Galil represents all the Habonim Dror members from the Philadelphia area. Different age groups are split into kenim (literally "nests"), and have various kef (fun) activities run for them by their year-round counselors, such as movies, bowling, haunted hay rides, fondue parties, and ice skating as well as chinuch (educational) activities which expand on the different curricular themes of the previous summer.

Also during the year are about five annual events which all the kenim participate in together. In September, Galil kicks off the events with an annual potluck dinner. Every fall and spring, Galil opens its gates for a three-day "seminar," where camp is in session from Friday afternoon until Sunday morning. This is a great time for people considering Galil to see what it's really like, and for people who've already been there to meet up with their friends. Every winter there is also a one-night Chanukkah sleepover, usually at a JCC. Eizor Galil (which is composed of all the kenim together) also normally runs celebrations for Passover, Purim, or both.

=== Age groups ===
Galil is attended by children finishing grades 3 through 9, who are split into schavot (age groups).

1. Post 2nd grade-"Taste of Galil"
2. Post 3rd grade-Younger Amelim
3. Post 4th grade-Amelim (workers)
4. Post 5th grade-Chotrim (rowers)
5. Post 6th grade- Par Par or Sayarim (patrollers)
6. Post 7th grade-Tzofim (scouts)
7. Post 8th grade-Bonim (builders)
8. Post 9th grade-Bogrim (graduates)
9. Post 10th grade-MBI MBI stands for Machaneh Bonim Israel or building camp in Israel (roughly translated). All post 10th graders from Habonim Dror camps around North America travel around together throughout Eretz Yisrael (the Land of Israel).

=== Other Machanot (camps) ===
Habonim Dror North America (The Builders of Freedom) has six active camps in North America, five of which were originally Habonim and one of which was originally Dror (Gesher). The camps are called (and located in) Miriam (Vancouver, Canada), Tavor (MI), Gesher (Ontario, Canada), Moshava (MD), Galil (PA), and Gilboa (CA).

=== Habonim Dror leadership training programs for graduates of Galil ===
Post 10th graders from Galil participate with 10th graders from all 6 Habonim Dror North America camps in a summer program in Israel called Machaneh Bonim b'Israel (MBI).

Post 11th graders engage in a summer leadership program called Madatz. This is a tochnit (program) dedicated to developing hadracha (leadership) and heightening the sense of kvutsah (group), similar to a CIT type experience and most of the graduates go on to become Madrachim (counselors) the following summers and youth leaders during the school year.

Post 12th graders participate in the Habonim Dror year program in Israel—the oldest such program—known as Workshop. Workshop is in its 72nd year (as of 2023). Chanichim (campers) and madrichim (councilors) alike identify themselves by their workshop number (or madatz year) and some even have a symbol for it.

=== Notable alumni ===
Notable alumni include:

1. Ron Bloom
2. Kenneth Bob
3. Jack Markell
4. Judith Rodin
5. Noah "Xaphoon Jones" Beresin

=== Facilities ===
Camp Galil bought its 63-acre campsite in 1946 from the local Young Women's Christian Association. Few of the buildings that already existed are still in use today. The original dining hall was turned into an assembly building (moadon) after the first major building project on site. That moadon was torn down, replaced by the Amy Adina Schulman Center in 2011. This two-building complex includes a stage, radio room, fireplace, musical instrument practice space, offices, and a resource room. The Amy Adina Schulman Center—known around camp as the MoAdina and Beit Adina—are named for a Galil alumna who died while studying at Rutgers University.

In 2013, Galil completed a conservation easement with Tinicum Conservancy to protect most of its acres.
