= Ruth Ann Minner =

American politician and businesswoman (1935–2021)

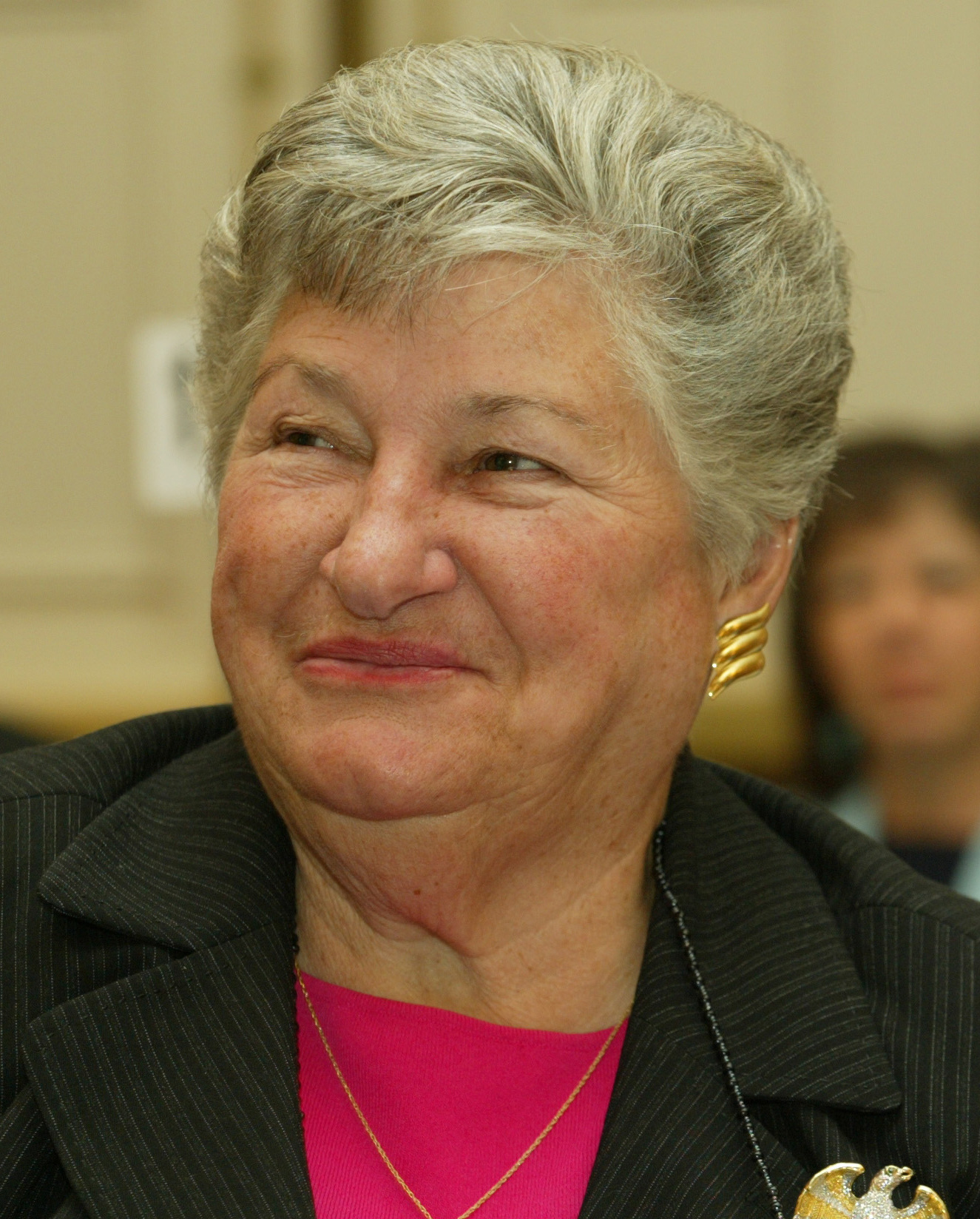

72nd Governor of Delaware
- In office January 3, 2001 – January 20, 2009
- Lieutenant: John Carney
- Preceded by: Tom Carper
- Succeeded by: Jack Markell

23rd Lieutenant Governor of Delaware
- In office January 19, 1993 – January 3, 2001
- Governor: Tom Carper
- Preceded by: Dale E. Wolf
- Succeeded by: John Carney

Member of the Delaware Senate from the 18th district
- In office January 4, 1983 – January 5, 1993
- Preceded by: William Murphy
- Succeeded by: Robert Voshell

Member of the Delaware House of Representatives from the 33rd district
- In office January 7, 1975 – January 4, 1983
- Preceded by: George Robbins
- Succeeded by: Harry Terry

Personal details
- Born: Ruth Ann Coverdale; January 17, 1935 Milford, Delaware, U.S.
- Died: November 4, 2021 (aged 86) Milford, Delaware, U.S.
- Party: Democratic
- Spouses: Frank Ingram (died 1967); Roger Minner (m. 1969; died 1991)
- Children: 3
- Education: Delaware Technical Community College (attended)

Ruth Ann Minner (née Coverdale; January 17, 1935 – November 4, 2021) was an American politician and businesswoman who served as the 72nd governor of Delaware from 2001 to 2009. She previously served in the Delaware General Assembly from 1975 to 1993, and as the 23rd lieutenant governor of Delaware from 1993 to 2001. A member of the Democratic Party, she was the first female governor of Delaware and the only woman to date to be elected to this position. She was originally from Milford, in Kent County, Delaware.

== Early life and education ==
Ruth Ann Coverdale was born on January 17, 1935, in Milford, Delaware, the daughter of Mary Ann (Lewis), a homemaker, and Samuel Coverdale, a sharecropper. While growing up, she left high school at age 16 to help support her family. Subsequently, she married Frank Ingram with whom she had three children: Frank Jr., Wayne, and Gary. When she was 32 her husband died suddenly of a heart attack in 1967, leaving her a single mother with three children. She earned her GED in 1968 and later attended Delaware Technical and Community College, while working two jobs to support the family. In 1969 she married Roger Minner and they operated a family towing business, the Roger Minner Wrecker Service. Roger Minner died of lung cancer in 1991.

== Professional and political career ==
Minner began her political career as a clerk in the Delaware House of Representatives and as a receptionist in the office of Governor Sherman W. Tribbitt. In 1974 she was elected to the State House as a member of the "Watergate Class," a group of newly elected legislators from both parties, who came into office on a "good government" mission and a strong sense of their ability to make significant improvements. Minner rose to become Delaware's most powerful female politician, but she did it in a very conventional way, representing a rural, small town constituency, and building relationships and expertise by working in the legislative process over many years. She served four terms in the State House, from the 1975/1976 session through the 1981/1982 session.

At various times she served as House Majority Whip and chair of the powerful Bond Bill Committee. She also chaired the Rules Committee. In that role she led several successful reforming efforts, including a change that removed the rule allowing Representatives to table roll call votes. This rule was used to help schedule votes when only the right combinations of Representatives were on the floor.

In 1982, Minner was elected to the Delaware Senate and served there from the 1983/1984 session through the 1991/1992 session. While in the State Senate Minner sponsored the Delaware Land and Water Conservation Act, a key piece of legislation that protected 30,000 acres (120 km^{2}) of land and created the Delaware Open Space Council. To fund the activities of this Council the General Assembly created the "Twenty-First Century Fund" from the proceeds of a multimillion-dollar corporate securities lawsuit. Elected Lieutenant Governor in 1992, she served two terms from January 19, 1993, to January 3, 2001. While in that position she chaired the Minner Commission on Government Reorganization and Effectiveness.

== Governor of Delaware ==
Seal of Ruth Ann Minner as Governor of Delaware

Minner was elected Governor of Delaware on November 7, 2000. She had secured the Democratic nomination after her long years in the General Assembly, as Lieutenant Governor and her demonstrated ability to run a campaign by her large statewide victory margins in 1992 and 1996. Her opponent in 2000 was Republican John M. Burris, who had barely survived a bitter September primary contest with retired judge Bill Lee. Minner won easily. As the incumbent lieutenant governor, Minner took office upon the resignation of Governor Tom Carper on January 3, 2001, after he was elected to a seat in the U.S. Senate; those extra two weeks of tenure, along with her full two terms as governor make her the longest serving governor in Delaware history. Upon completing the unexpired term, Minner began her first full term on January 16, 2001, and was elected to a second term in 2004. She served as the first female president of the Council of State Governments in 2005.

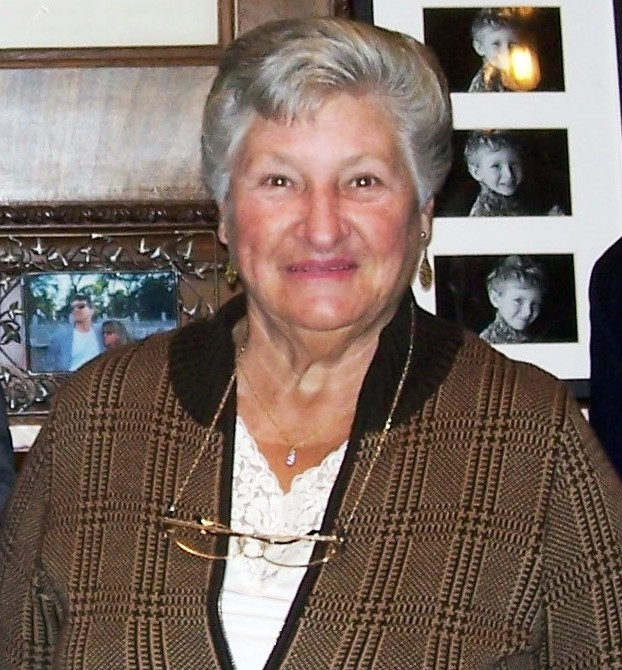
Minner in 2007

Minner was Delaware's fourth consecutive two-term governor and largely continued the business-oriented policies and bipartisan, consensus style begun by her Republican predecessor, Pete du Pont. She was usually described as a "middle-of-the-road politician, with conservative fiscal views but progressive social policies." As governor, she worked to decrease cancer rates in Delaware, saying she "was determined to reduce Delaware's high cancer rates. A task force ... has created a road map of specific steps necessary ... and I am implementing that plan. [One] result has been ... the Clean Indoor Air Act, which has reduced cancerous pollutants in Delaware's restaurants, bars and casinos by more than 90 percent."

Regarding education, she said, "While it might be popular, it is not demanding to set standards that all students can meet right away ... Once high standards have been set, the key is to give our students, educators and parents the tools to continuously improve." She supported "giving local schools control of [most] new education dollars ... expanding after-school and weekend class programs ... and supports reading and math specialists." She opposed vouchers. "In 2005, she signed legislation creating the Student Excellence Equals Degree (SEED) Scholarship program, which enables students who keep their grades up and stay out of trouble to go to college for free in the state of Delaware. She also expanded her education specialist program, which has placed reading specialists in every elementary school, to also include a plan to place math specialists in every Delaware middle school."

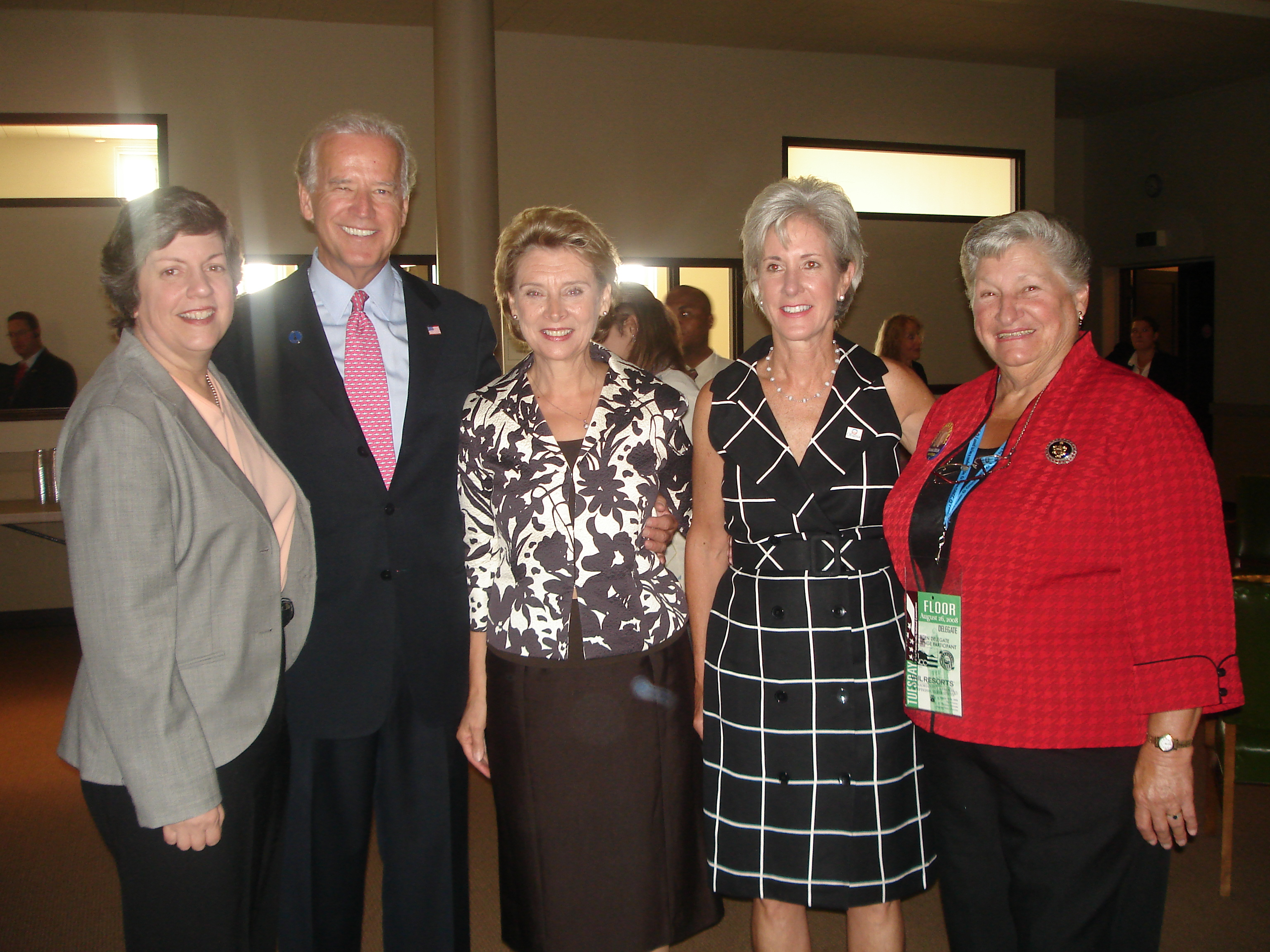
Minner with then-U.S. Senator Joe Biden and then-governors Janet Napolitano, Christine Gregoire and Kathleen Sebelius at the 2008 Democratic National Convention

On other issues she was "a firm supporter of a measure that would simply add sexual orientation to the list of characteristics in the Delaware code ... that are not allowed to be used as basis for discrimination." She opposed "new gun control legislation," but supported "legislation requiring mandatory trigger locks and gun safety courses in schools." And she said "I do not support additional sites or kinds of gambling ... the state should not become any more reliant on this form of revenue."

In her second inaugural address in January 2005, Minner concluded with this description of her philosophy: "for Ruth Ann Minner, farmer, gardener and daughter of a sharecropper, it is simply this: Work hard. Do the right thing. And leave things better than you found them."

Before she left office on January 20, 2009, longtime senator Joe Biden had resigned January 15, 2009, after winning a seventh term, to become Vice President. Minner appointed Biden's former chief of staff, Ted Kaufman to Biden's Senate seat.

Delaware General Assembly (sessions while Governor)
Year	Assembly	Senate majority	President pro tempore	House majority	Speaker
2001–2002	141st	Democratic	Thomas B. Sharp	Republican	Terry R. Spence
2003–2004	142nd	Democratic	Thurman Adams	Republican	Terry R. Spence
2005–2006	143rd	Democratic	Thurman Adams	Republican	Terry R. Spence
2007–2008	144th	Democratic	Thurman Adams	Republican	Terry R. Spence

== Death ==
Minner died under hospice care in Milford on November 4, 2021, at age 86, after complications from a fall. She died about 6 months after former governor Pete du Pont died on May 18, 2021, of multiple long illnesses.

== Election results ==
Delaware General Assembly service
Dates	Assembly	Chamber	Majority	Governor	Committees	District
1975–1976	128th	State House	Democratic	Sherman W. Tribbitt		33rd
1977–1978	129th	State House	Democratic	Pete du Pont		33rd
1979–1980	130th	State House	Republican	Pete du Pont		33rd
1981–1982	131st	State House	Republican	Pete du Pont		33rd
1983–1984	132nd	State Senate	Democratic	Pete du Pont		18th
1985–1986	133rd	State Senate	Democratic	Mike Castle		18th
1987–1988	134th	State Senate	Democratic	Mike Castle		18th
1989–1990	135th	State Senate	Democratic	Mike Castle		18th
1991–1992	136th	State Senate	Democratic	Mike Castle		18th

Election results
Year	Office	Election	Subject	Party	Votes	%	Opponent	Party	Votes	%
1992	Lt. Governor	General	Ruth Ann Minner	Democratic	165,356	61%	Philip D. Cloutier	Republican	102,670	38%
1996	Lt. Governor	General	Ruth Ann Minner	Democratic	186,567	70%	Sherman N. Miller	Republican	73,870	28%
2000	Governor	General	Ruth Ann Minner	Democratic	191,484	60%	John M. Burris	Republican	128,436	40%
2004	Governor	General	Ruth Ann Minner	Democratic	185,687	51%	Bill Lee	Republican	167,115	46%

== See also ==
- List of female governors in the United States
- List of female lieutenant governors in the United States

== Notes ==
Party political offices
Preceded by Gary Hindes	Democratic nominee for Lieutenant Governor of Delaware; 1992, 1996	Succeeded by John Carney
Preceded by Tom Carper	Democratic nominee for Governor of Delaware; 2000, 2004	Succeeded by Jack Markell
Political offices
Preceded by Dale E. Wolf	Lieutenant Governor of Delaware; 1993–2001	Succeeded by John Carney
Preceded by Tom Carper	Governor of Delaware; 2001–2009	Succeeded by Jack Markell
