= 1992 Delaware lieutenant gubernatorial election =

- November 3, 1992
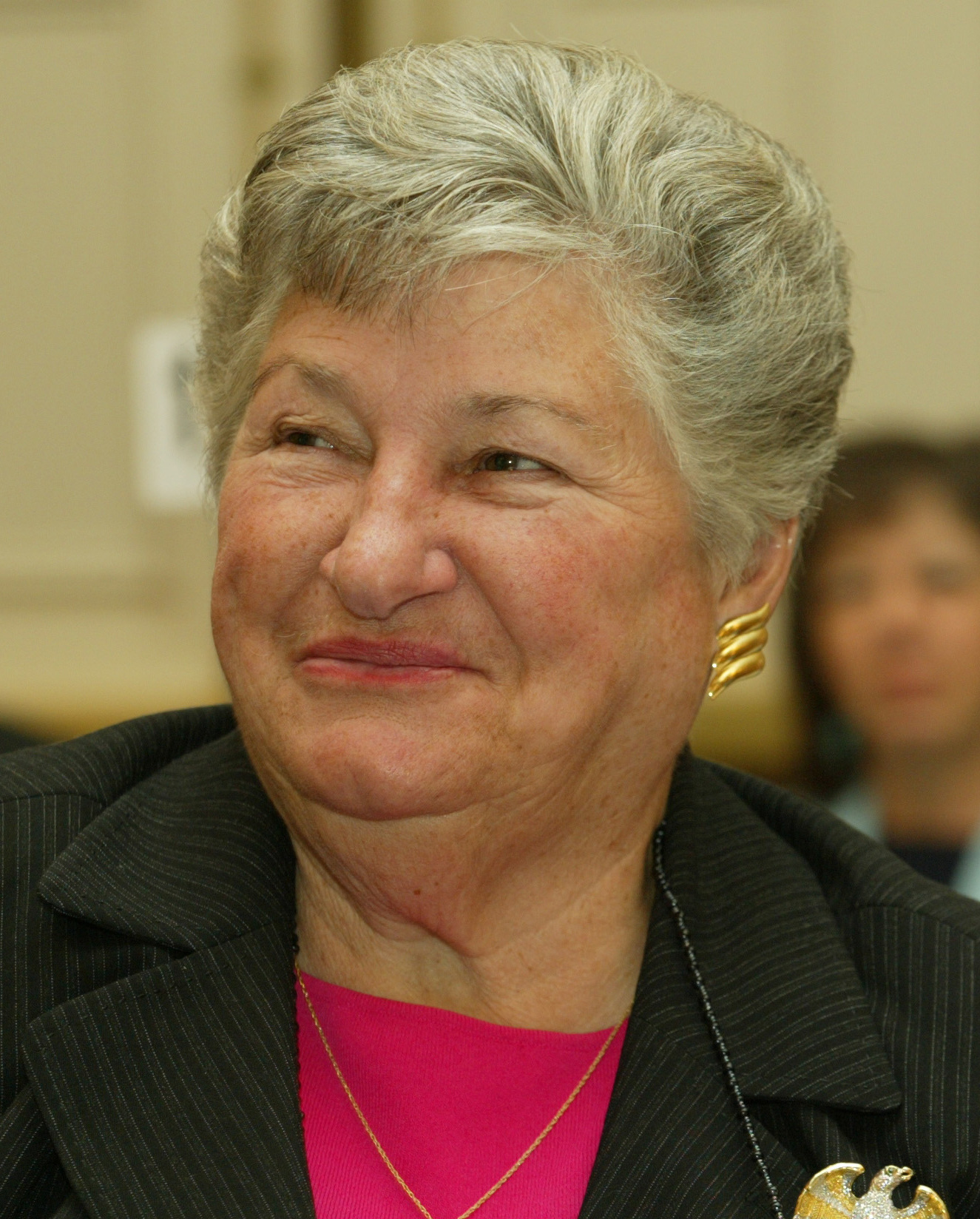

Nominee	Ruth Ann Minner	Philip D. Cloutier
Party	Democratic	Republican
Popular vote	165,356	102,670
Percentage	60.88%	37.80%
- Minner: 40–50% 50–60% 60–70% 70–80% 80–90% Cloutier: 50–60%
Lieutenant Governor before election
Dale E. Wolf
Republican
Elected Lieutenant Governor
Ruth Ann Minner
Democratic

The 1992 Delaware lieutenant gubernatorial election was held on November 3, 1992, in order to elect the lieutenant governor of Delaware. Democratic nominee and incumbent member of the Delaware Senate Ruth Ann Minner defeated Republican nominee and incumbent member of the New Castle County Council Philip D. Cloutier and Libertarian nominee Lawrence D. Sullivan. Thereby becoming the first woman to hold the office of lieutenant governor.

== General election ==
On election day, November 3, 1992, Democratic nominee Ruth Ann Minner won the election by a margin of 62,686 votes against her foremost opponent Republican nominee Philip D. Cloutier, thereby gaining Democratic control over the office of lieutenant governor. Minner was sworn in as the 23rd lieutenant governor of Delaware on January 19, 1993.

=== Results ===
Delaware lieutenant gubernatorial election, 1992
Party	Candidate	Votes	%
Democratic	Ruth Ann Minner	165,356	60.88
Republican	Philip D. Cloutier	102,670	37.80
Libertarian	Lawrence D. Sullivan	3,599	1.32
Total votes		271,625	100.00
Democratic gain from Republican			
