= 1996 Delaware lieutenant gubernatorial election =

- November 5, 1996
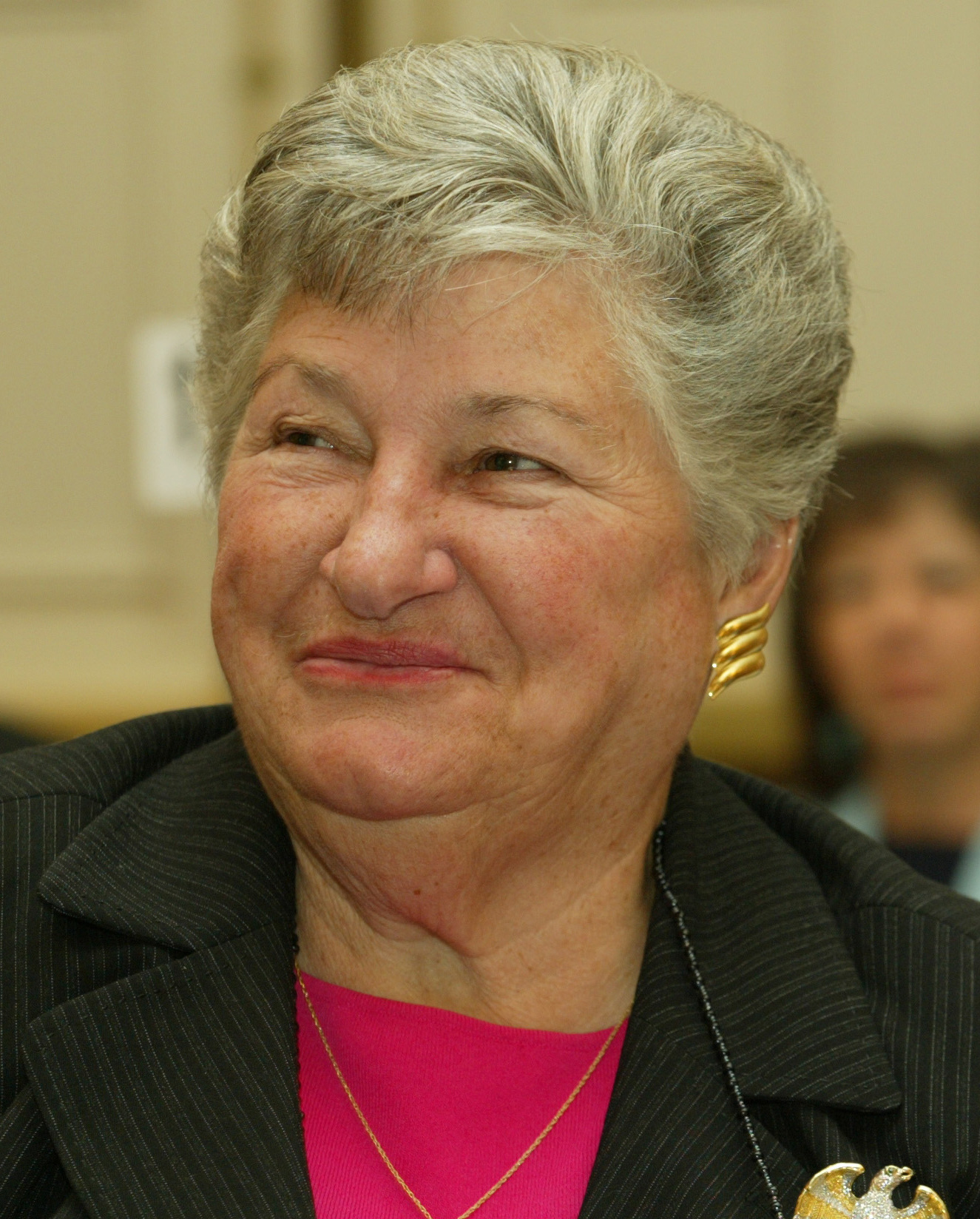

Nominee	Ruth Ann Minner	Sherman N. Miller
Party	Democratic	Republican
Popular vote	186,567	73,870
Percentage	70.14%	27.77%
- Minner: 50–60% 60–70% 70–80% 80–90%
Lieutenant Governor before election
Ruth Ann Minner
Democratic
Elected Lieutenant Governor
Ruth Ann Minner
Democratic

The 1996 Delaware lieutenant gubernatorial election was held on November 5, 1996, in order to elect the lieutenant governor of Delaware. Democratic nominee and incumbent lieutenant governor Ruth Ann Minner defeated Republican nominee Sherman N. Miller and Libertarian nominee Danny Ray Beaver.

== General election ==
On election day, November 5, 1996, Democratic nominee Ruth Ann Minner won re-election by a margin of 112,697 votes against her foremost opponent Republican nominee Sherman N. Miller, thereby retaining Democratic control over the office of lieutenant governor. Minner was sworn in for her second term on January 21, 1997.

=== Results ===
Delaware lieutenant gubernatorial election, 1996
Party	Candidate	Votes	%
Democratic	Ruth Ann Minner (incumbent)	186,567	70.14
Republican	Sherman N. Miller	73,870	27.77
Libertarian	Danny Ray Beaver	5,540	2.09
Total votes		265,977	100.00
Democratic hold			
