= James H. Baxter Jr. =

American politician (1924–2018)

Acting Delaware Secretary of Agriculture
- In office April 24, 1979 – June 15, 1979
- Governor: Pete du Pont
- Preceded by: William E. McDaniel
- Succeeded by: Alden S. Hopkins Jr

Personal details
- Born: March 14, 1924 Stockley, Delaware
- Died: August 11, 2018 (aged 94) Stockley, Delaware
- Political party: Republican

James H. Baxter Jr. (March 14, 1924 – August 11, 2018) was a farmer and politician from Delaware.

== Early life ==
Born to James H. Baxter Sr., and Mary Alice (née Short) Baxter on March 14, 1924, he was a lifelong resident of Stockley, Delaware. Baxter enlisted in the Army in October 1944 and served with the 121st Mech Cavalry during the Second World War. Following the War, he returned to farming with his wife and two sons, expanding production with support from the G.I. Bill.

Baxter was twice elected as Sussex County's Recorder of Deeds between 1967 and 1974. A delegate to the 1976 Republican National Convention, he supported the candidacy of Ronald Reagan.

== 1978 Senate campaign ==
In 1978, Baxter sought to be the Republican nominee for election to the United States Senate. The September 9 primary saw Baxter facing James A Venema, an opponent of "court-orded busing for desegregation", according to The Morning News. While both candidates were reported to have few substantial differences, Baxter was backed by the Republican Party establishment, whereas Venema was regarded as drawing support from a blue-collar base. Three weeks before the primary, Baxter had raised more than double the funds of Venema. Baxter won the nomination on a low turnout, in what was described as a campaign that "polarized" the party, although the candidates themselves remained "courteous ... [to] each other."

Bob Dole, who campaigned for Baxter during the Senate race, termed his politics "moderate-to-conservative" with a "commitment to the Republican Party and fiscal responsibility." At the election on November 7, he was defeated by the Democratic incumbent, Joe Biden, 58% to 41%. Baxter's campaign director blamed the scale of the loss on a lack of support from Venema, Baxter's opponent in the primary.

== Acting Secretary of Agriculture ==
In April 1979, Delaware Governor Pete du Pont nominated Baxter to serve as Delaware Secretary of Agriculture. On May 10, the Delaware Senate voted 10–8, along party lines, against confirmation. Reporting in The News Journal indicated that Baxter's decision to cut staffing in the Agriculture Department generated significant opposition from Democratic Party members in the Senate. In addition, a perception of being too strongly aligned to Republican Party politics counted against him. The Delaware Farm Bureau called for the nomination to be resubmitted, which Governor du Pont considered, but rather than face a second vote, where the Democratic Party majority made a successful vote unlikely, Baxter resigned as Acting Secretary in June.

== Later life ==
In September 1980, Baxter served as Chair of the Delaware Farm Families for Reagan-Bush Committee, in the lead up to the 1980 presidential election. Immediately following the election, he called for an end to United States grain embargo against the Soviet Union arguing the embargo had no effect on the Soviet Union and only harmed US farmers.

In January 2011, Ed Kee, Delaware Secretary of Agriculture, presented Baxter with the Secretary's Award for Distinguished Service. Commenting on the occasion, Governor Jack Markell noted that Baxter had "played a tremendous role in Delaware's agriculture industry and in the community."

Baxter died on August 11, 2018. He was survived by his wife of 69 years, Ruth (Dodd) Baxter.
