= 1984 United States Senate election in Delaware =

- November 6, 1984
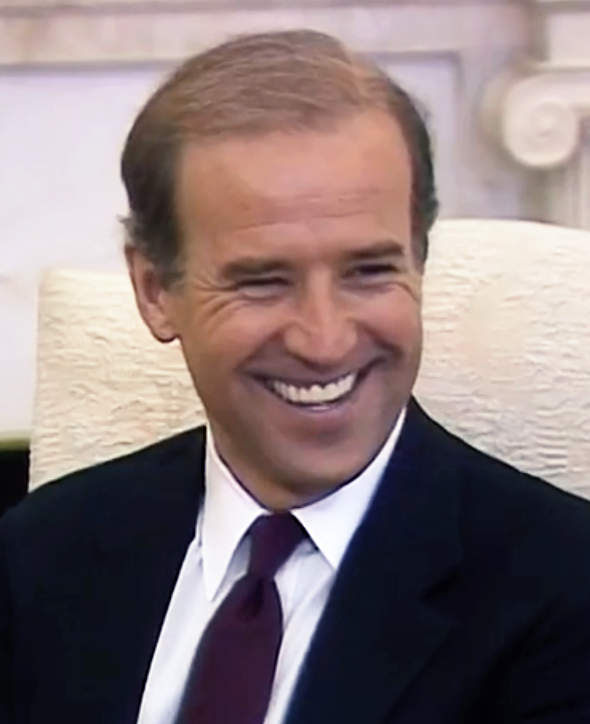

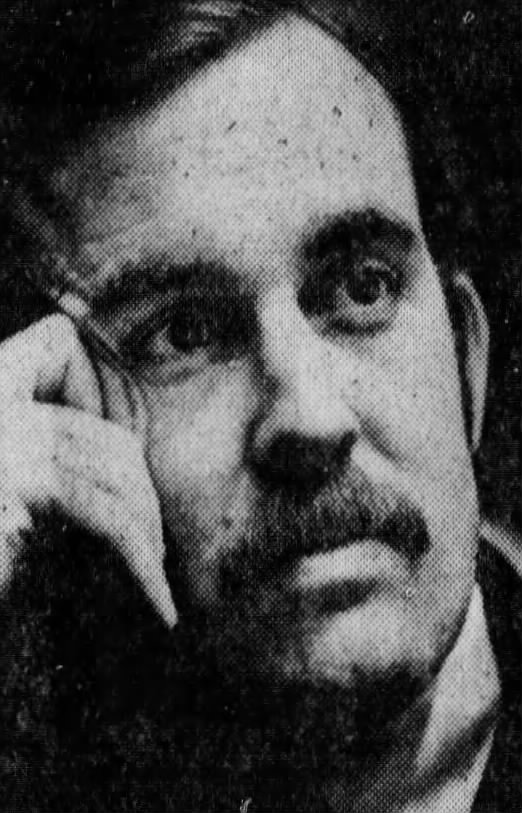
Nominee	Joe Biden	John M. Burris
Party	Democratic	Republican
Popular vote	147,831	98,101
Percentage	60.11%	39.89%
- Biden: 50–60% 60–70% 70–80% 80–90% >90% Burris: 50–60%
U.S. senator before election
Joe Biden
Democratic
Elected U.S. Senator
Joe Biden
Democratic

The 1984 United States Senate election in Delaware was held on November 6, 1984. Incumbent Democratic Senator Joe Biden won re-election to a third term, defeating Republican challenger John M. Burris. Like many other Senate Democrats running for re-election in 1984, his state was also carried by Ronald Reagan.

== General election ==
=== Candidates ===
- Joe Biden (D), incumbent Delaware Senator running for a third Senatorial term
- John M. Burris (R), businessman and former Minority and later Majority Leader of the Delaware House of Representatives

=== Results ===
General election results
Party	Candidate	Votes	%	±%
Democratic	Joe Biden (incumbent)	147,831	60.11%	+2.15%
Republican	John M. Burris	98,101	39.89%	−1.13%
Majority		49,730	20.22%	+3.28%
Turnout		245,932		
Democratic hold		Swing		

==== County results ====
County	Joseph Robinette Biden Jr. Democratic		John M. Burris Republican		Total votes cast
County	#	%	#	%	#
Kent	18,911	58.46%	13,424	41.52%	32,335
New Castle	107,636	62.22%	65,352	37.78%	172,988
Sussex	21,284	52.41%	19,325	47.59%	40,609
Totals	147,831	60.11%	98,101	39.89%	245,932

== See also ==
- 1984 United States Senate elections
