= 1978 United States Senate election in Delaware =

- November 7, 1978
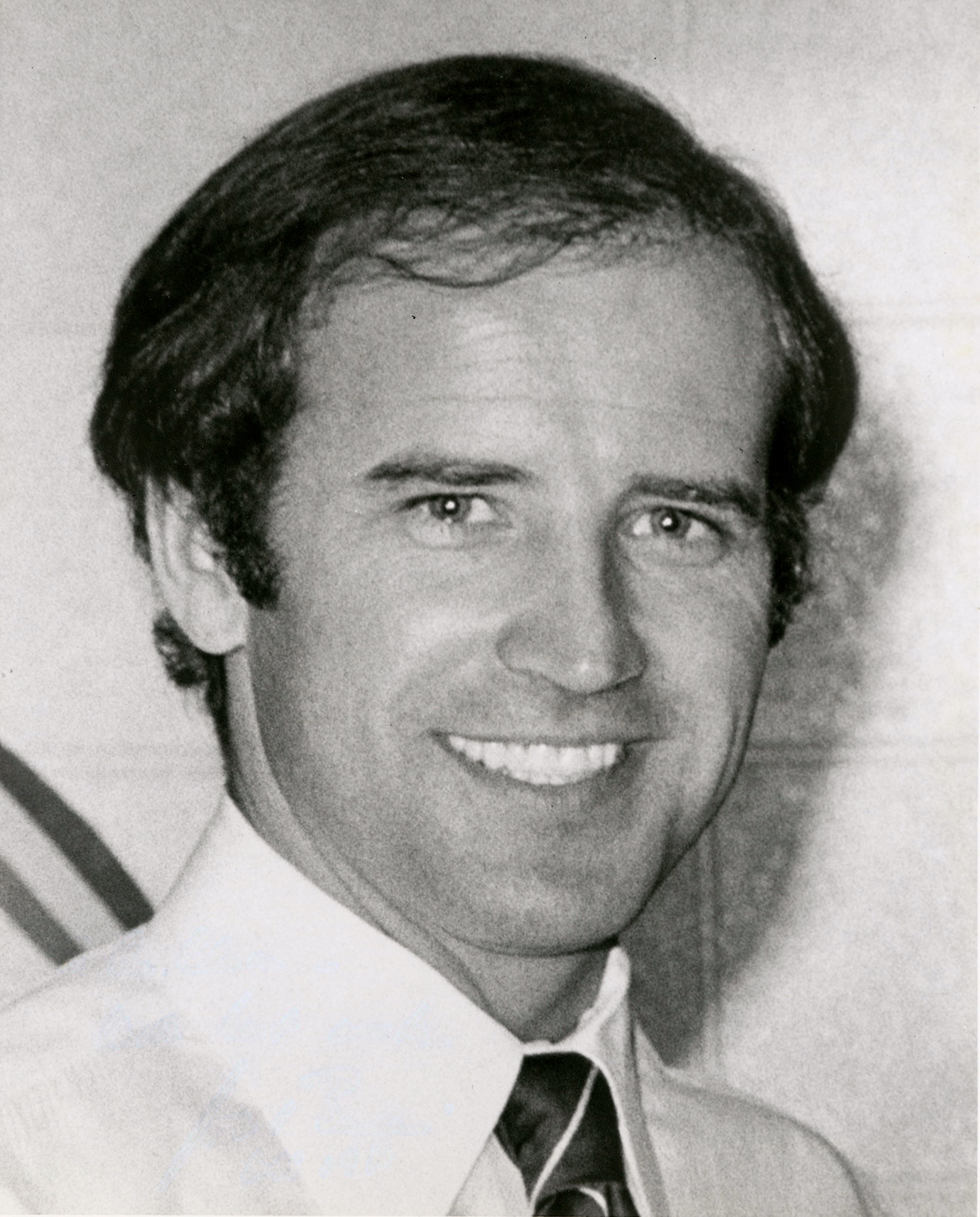

Nominee	Joe Biden	James H. Baxter Jr.
Party	Democratic	Republican
Popular vote	93,930	66,479
Percentage	57.96%	41.02%
- Biden: 50–60% 60–70% 70–80% 80–90% Baxter: 50–60% 60–70%
U.S. senator before election
Joe Biden
Democratic
Elected U.S. Senator
Joe Biden
Democratic

The 1978 United States Senate election in Delaware was held on November 7, 1978. Incumbent Democratic senator Joe Biden won re-election to a second term, defeating Republican challenger James H. Baxter Jr. in a landslide victory. This is the first of five elections in which Biden won all counties.

== Republican primary ==
The Republican Party primary was held on September 9, 1978. Venema was previously an independent before declaring himself a candidate in March 1978. Candidates Venema and Baxter were described by The Washington Post as being "two think-alike Reagan conservatives" but differed in terms of background and "personal style".

=== Candidates ===
- James H. Baxter Jr., Sussex County Recorder of Deeds
- James Allyn Venema, cardboard sign manufacturer, anti-desegregation busing activist, president of the Positive Action Committee and the National Association of Neighborhood Schools

=== Results ===
Republican primary results
Party	Candidate	Votes	%
Republican	James H. Baxter Jr.	12,107	53.74%
Republican	James Allyn Venema	10,422	46.26%
Total votes		22,662	100.00%

== General election ==
=== Candidates ===
- James H. Baxter Jr. (R), Sussex County Recorder of Deeds
- Joe Biden (D), incumbent Delaware Senator running for his first reelection
- Donald G. Gies (A), officer in the US Air Force Reserve

=== Results ===
General election results
Party	Candidate	Votes	%	±%
Democratic	Joseph R. Biden, Jr. (incumbent)	93,930	57.96%	+7.48%
Republican	James H. Baxter Jr.	66,479	41.02%	−8.08%
American	Donald G. Gies	1,663	1.02%	+0.68%
Majority		27,451	16.94%	+15.56%
Turnout		162,072		
Democratic hold		Swing		

==== County results ====
County	Joseph R. Biden Jr. Democratic		James H. Baxter Jr. Republican		Donald G. Gies American		Total votes cast
County	#	%	#	%	#	%	Total votes cast
Kent	12,860	59.95%	8,485	39.95%	107	0.5%	21,452
New Castle	66,256	58.87%	44,834	39.84%	1,449	1.29%	112,539
Sussex	14,814	52.75%	13,160	46.86%	107	0.38%	28,081
Total	93,930	57.96%	66,479	41.02%	1,663	1.03%	162,072

== See also ==
- 1978 United States Senate elections
