= 2004 Delaware gubernatorial election =

- November 2, 2004
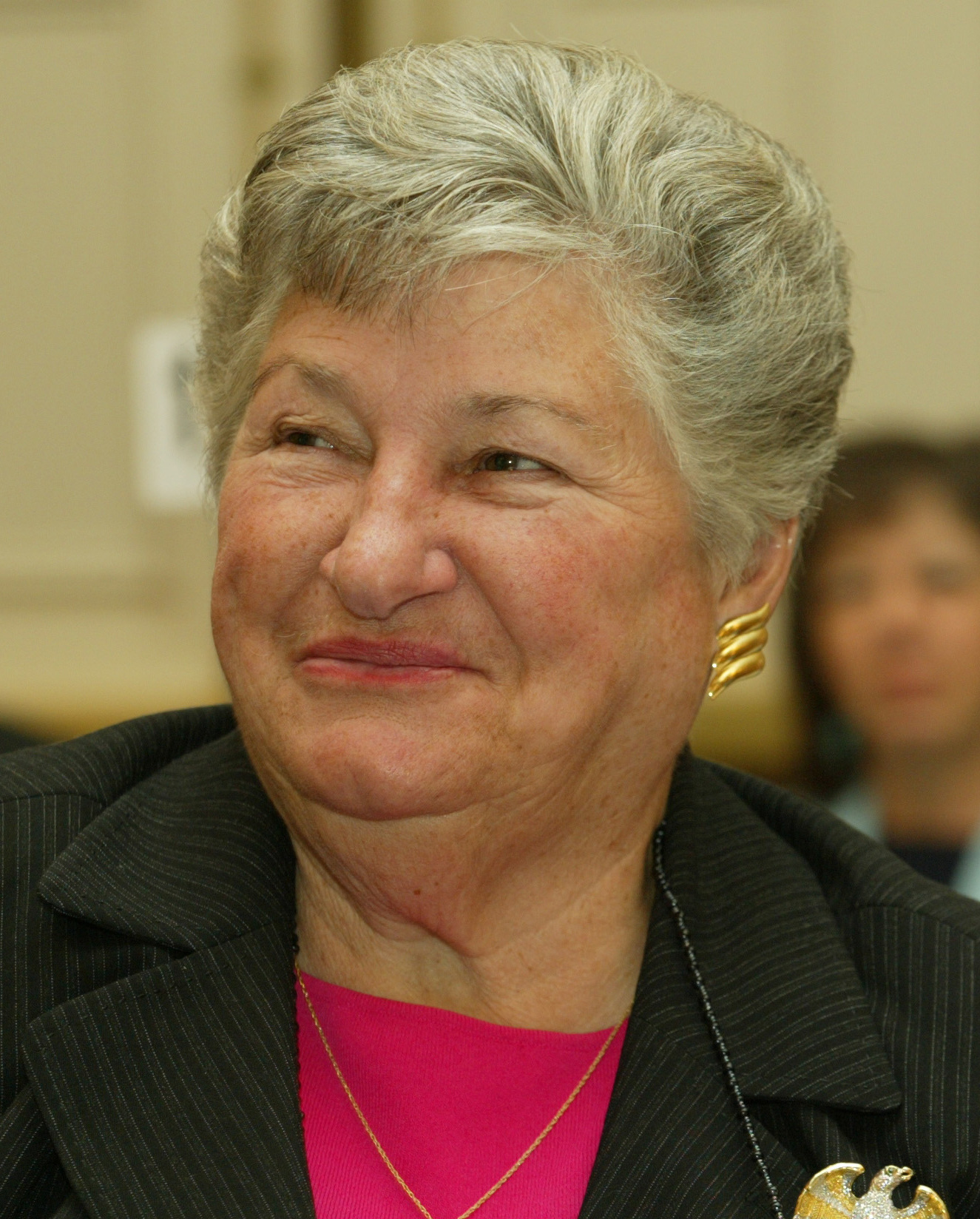

| Nominee | Ruth Ann Minner | Bill Lee |
| Party | Democratic | Republican |
| Popular vote | 185,548 | 167,008 |
| Percentage | 50.87% | 45.79% |
- Minner: 40–50% 50–60% 60–70% 70–80% Lee: 40–50% 50–60%
Governor before election
Ruth Ann Minner
Democratic
Elected Governor
Ruth Ann Minner
Democratic

The 2004 Delaware gubernatorial election was held on November 2, 2004, coinciding with the U.S. presidential election. Incumbent Governor Ruth Ann Minner faced a serious challenge from retired Superior Court Judge Bill Lee but managed a five-point victory on election day. As of 2026, this is the last time Kent County voted Republican in a gubernatorial election, and the last time the Republican gubernatorial nominee won a majority of Delaware's counties.

== Primaries ==
=== Democratic Party ===
- Ruth Ann Minner, incumbent Governor of Delaware

Democratic primary results
| Party | Candidate | Votes | % |
|---|---|---|---|
| Democratic | Ruth Ann Minner (incumbent) | 41,671 | 100.00 |

=== Republican Party ===
- Bill Lee, former Delaware Superior Court Justice
- David Charles Graham, state government employee
- Michael D. Protack, pilot

Republican primary results
| Party | Candidate | Votes | % |
|---|---|---|---|
| Republican | Bill Lee | 15,270 | 70.47 |
| Republican | Michael D. Protack | 5,108 | 23.57 |
| Republican | David Charles Graham | 1,292 | 5.96 |
| Total votes | | 21,670 | 100.00 |

=== Independent Party/Libertarian Party ===
- Frank Infante, Independent Party of Delaware and Libertarian Party of Delaware fusion ticket nominee

== Campaign ==
=== Predictions ===
| Source | Ranking | As of |
|---|---|---|
| Sabato's Crystal Ball | Likely D | November 1, 2004 |

=== Results ===
Delaware gubernatorial election, 2004
| Party | Candidate | Votes | % | ±% |
|---|---|---|---|---|
| Democratic | Ruth Ann Minner (incumbent) | 185,548 | 50.87% | −8.38% |
| Republican | Bill Lee | 167,008 | 45.79% | +6.04% |
| Independent Party | Frank Infante | 12,203 | 3.34% | +1.8% |
| Majority | | 18,540 | 5.08% | −14.42% |
| Turnout | | 364,759 | | |
| Democratic hold | | Swing | | |

==== By county ====
By county

| County | Ruth Ann Minner Democratic | | William Lee Republican | | All Others | |
| County | # | % | # | % | # | % |
|---|---|---|---|---|---|---|
| Kent | 22,324 | 40.67 | 28,562 | 52.03 | 4,006 | 7.3 |
| New Castle | 128,953 | 55.26 | 99,479 | 42.63 | 4,942 | 2.12 |
| Sussex | 34,271 | 44.8 | 38,967 | 50.94 | 3,255 | 4.26 |
| Totals | 185,548 | 50.87 | 167,008 | 45.79 | 12,203 | 3.35 |

Counties that flipped from Democratic to Republican

- Kent (largest city: Dover)
- Sussex (largest city: Seaford)

== See also ==
- Politics of Delaware
