= TMI Group of Companies =

American materials company

The TMI Group of Companies
- Company type: Private
- Industry: Pulp/Paper/Packaging
- Founded: 1931
- Headquarters: New Castle, DE, USA
- Products: Laboratory Equipment
- Number of employees: > 100
- Subsidiaries: Testing Machines, Inc., Büchel BV, Fibro System AB, Lako Seal Testers, TMI Canada, TMI Shanghai Ltd.
- Website: http://www.testingmachines.com

The TMI Group of Companies is a multi-national organization that manufactures and markets physical property testing instruments for the packaging, paper, pulp, plastic film, foil, ink, coatings, nonwoven, textile, adhesives, and corrugated industries.

The TMI Group of Companies consists of Testing Machines Inc. (Delaware, USA), Büchel BV (Netherlands), Fibro System AB (Sweden), Lako Seal Testers (Delaware, USA), TMI Canada, and TMI Shanghai Ltd. (China).

== History ==
TMI was founded in 1931 in New York, primarily as a distributor of laboratory testing instruments. Since then, it has expanded to not only distribute, but also design and manufacture instruments. Since 2009, The TMI Group has made five global acquisitions. In 2010, the headquarters relocated from Ronkonkoma, NY, to the current green-energy facility in New Castle, DE.

== Current Activities ==
The TMI Group's corporate headquarters are located in New Castle, Delaware, in a 20,000 square foot green-energy building. The facility is equipped with 160 solar panels, geo-thermal heating and cooling, and LED lighting.

In 2011, TMI was presented the Delaware Small Business Administration’s Family Owned Business of the Year award.

On March 14, 2014, TMI was acquired by Union Park Capital, a Boston-based private equity firm.

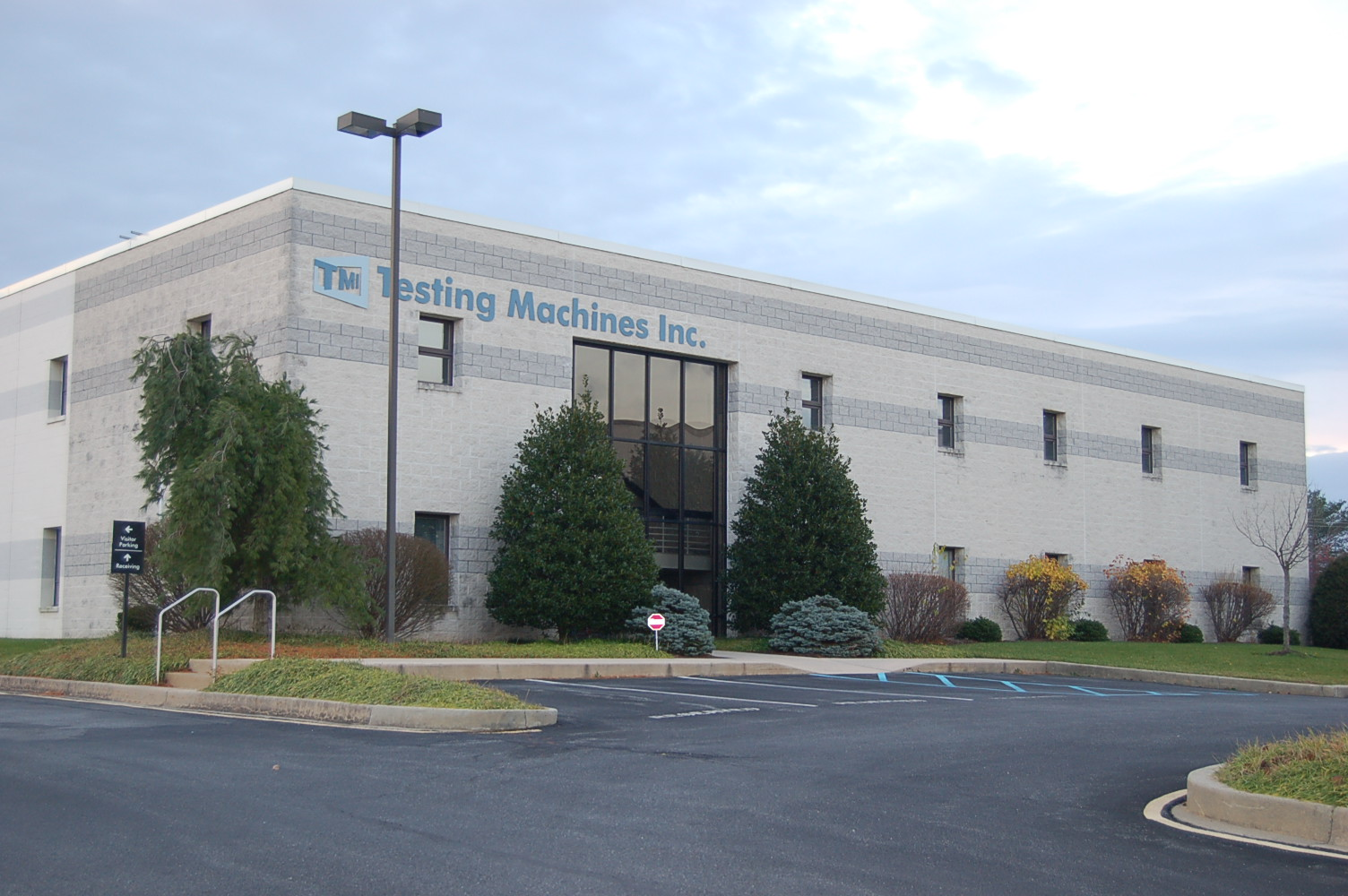
The TMI Group's headquarters in New Castle, DE

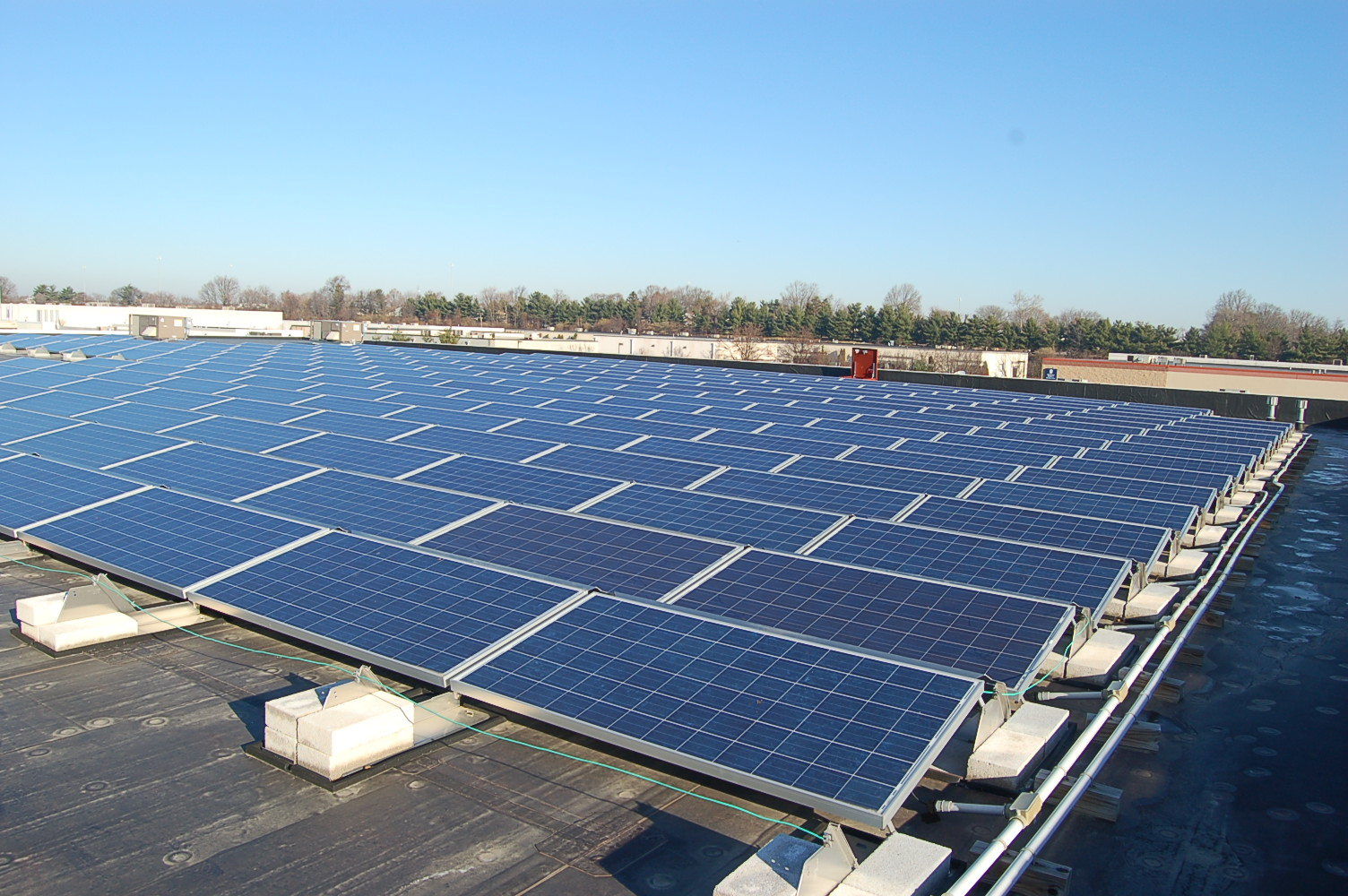
Solar panels on the roof of the headquarters

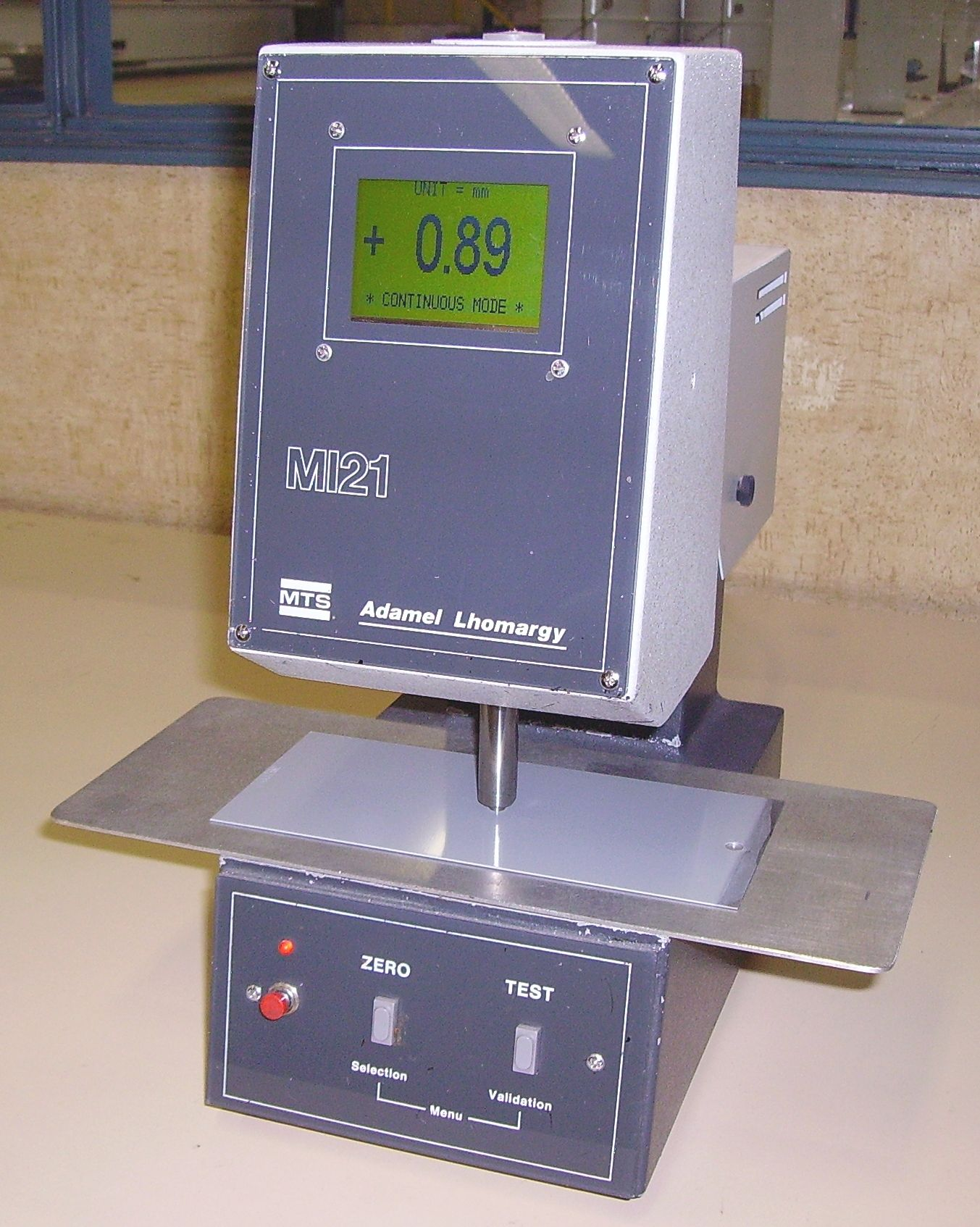
Micrometer by MTS
