= 1984 United States presidential election in Delaware =

- November 6, 1984

Nominee	Ronald Reagan	Walter Mondale
Party	Republican	Democratic
Home state	California	Minnesota
Running mate	George H. W. Bush	Geraldine Ferraro
Electoral vote	3	0
Popular vote	152,190	101,656
Percentage	59.78%	39.93%

Reagan
50–60%
60–70%
70–80%
Mondale
50–60%
60–70%
80–90%
President before election
Ronald Reagan
Republican
Elected President
Ronald Reagan
Republican

The 1984 United States presidential election in Delaware took place on November 6, 1984. All 50 states and the District of Columbia, were part of the 1984 United States presidential election. State voters chose three electors to the Electoral College, which selected the president and vice president of the United States. Delaware was won by incumbent United States president Ronald Reagan of California, who was running against former vice president Walter Mondale of Minnesota. Reagan ran for a second time with former C.I.A. Director George H. W. Bush of Texas, and Mondale ran with Representative Geraldine Ferraro of New York, the first major female candidate for the vice presidency.

The presidential election of 1984 was a very partisan election for Delaware, with over 99% of the electorate voting either Democratic or Republican, though 6 parties appeared on the ballot. All three of Delaware's counties gave Reagan an outright majority.

Reagan won Delaware by just shy of 20%, which made Delaware about 1% more Republican than the nation at large. His strongest county was Sussex County, Delaware's southernmost county, where he received over 2/3 of the vote. He also received over 60% in Delaware's middle county, Kent County. In New Castle County, Delaware's northernmost and most populous county, Reagan won by double digits, but was held to a 14.5% margin, discernibly less than his national margin.

== Results ==
1984 United States presidential election in Delaware
Party	Candidate	Votes	%
Republican	Ronald Reagan (inc.)	152,190	59.78%
Democratic	Walter Mondale	101,656	39.93%
American	Delmar D. Dennis	269	0.11%
Libertarian	David Bergland	268	0.11%
Citizens	Sonia Johnson	121	0.05%
Independent (Note: Although Serrette was affiliated with the New Alliance Party nationally, he was listed as unaffiliated on the ballot in Delaware.)	Dennis L. Serrette	68	0.03%
Total votes		254,572	100.00%

=== Results by county ===
County	Ronald Reagan Republican		Walter Mondale Democratic		All Others Various		Margin		Total votes cast
County	#	%	#	%	#	%	#	%	Total votes cast
Kent	21,531	64.46%	11,789	35.29%	83	0.25%	9,742	29.17%	33,403
New Castle	102,322	57.14%	76,238	42.57%	517	0.29%	26,084	14.57%	179,077
Sussex	28,337	67.32%	13,629	32.38%	126	0.30%	14,708	34.94%	42,092
Totals	152,190	59.78%	101,656	39.93%	726	0.29%	50,534	19.85%	254,572

== See also ==
- United States presidential elections in Delaware
- Presidency of Ronald Reagan
