= John M. Burris =

American politician (born 1946)

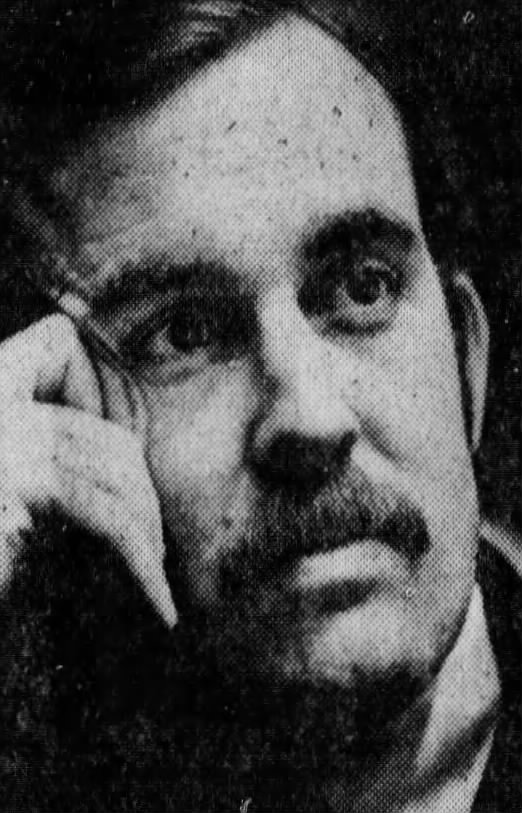
- Burris in 1982

Member of the Delaware House of Representatives from the 36th district
- In office 1977–1983
- Preceded by: Lewis B. Harrington
- Succeeded by: Howard A. Clendaniel

Personal details
- Born: April 19, 1946 (age 80) Milford, Delaware, U.S.
- Party: Republican
- Education: Ohio Wesleyan University

John M. Burris (born April 19, 1946) is an American politician and businessman. He served as a Republican member for the 36th district of the Delaware House of Representatives.

== Life and career ==
Burris was born in Milford, Delaware. He attended Ohio Wesleyan University.

Burris was a businessman.

Burris served in the Delaware House of Representatives from 1977 to 1983. In 1978, he was elected by his fellow House Republicans to serve as the Delaware House Minority Leader.

In 1984, Burris was the Republican party nominee for U.S Senate.

In 2021, Burris was awarded the Gilman Bowl by Delaware's state government for his role in Delaware's economy.
