= PAWG =

PAWG may refer to:

- Pennsylvania Wing Civil Air Patrol, the highest echelon of the U.S. Civil Air Patrol
- Wrangell Airport, whose ICAO airport code is PAWG
