= 476 (disambiguation) =

476 may refer to:

- Interstate 476, an Interstate highway in Pennsylvania.
- The year 476 on the Gregorian calendar.
- Public Law 476, an act of 79th United States Congress chartering the Civil Air Patrol.

== See also ==
- 476th (disambiguation)
