= Alabama Wing Civil Air Patrol =

Highest echelon of Alabama Civil Air Patrol

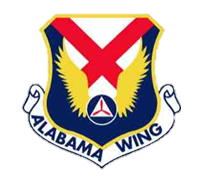
- Alabama Wing of Civil Air Patrol

Associated branches
- United States Air Force

Command staff
- Commander: Col Kim Miller
- Deputy Commander: Lt Col N/A
- Chief of Staff: Lt Col David Hartin

Current statistics
- Cadets: 427
- Seniors: 527
- Total Membership: 954
- Website: alwg.cap.gov
- Statistics as of 3 May 2025

The Alabama Wing Civil Air Patrol (ALWG) is one of 52 wings (50 states, Puerto Rico, and Washington, D.C.) in Civil Air Patrol (the official United States Air Force Auxiliary).

== Mission ==
Civil Air Patrol has three missions: providing emergency services; offering cadet programs for youth; and providing aerospace education for both CAP members and the general public.

=== Emergency Services ===
CAP actively provides emergency services, includes search and rescue and disaster relief operations, as well as assisting in the providing of humanitarian aid.

Members of Alabama Wing have practiced their ability to find downed planes by running a drill in which pilots searched from the air for practice beacons, and ground teams were then dispatched to the proper location.

CAP also provides Air Force support through conducting light transport, communications support, and low-altitude route surveys. Civil Air Patrol can also offer support to counter-drug missions.

=== Cadet Programs ===
CAP offers cadet programs for youth aged 12 to 21, which includes providing aerospace education, leadership training, physical fitness and moral leadership to cadets.

=== Aerospace Education ===
CAP provides aerospace education for both CAP members and the general public. Fulfilling the education component of the overall CAP mission includes training members of CAP, offering workshops for youth throughout the nation through schools, and providing education through public aviation events.

== Organization ==
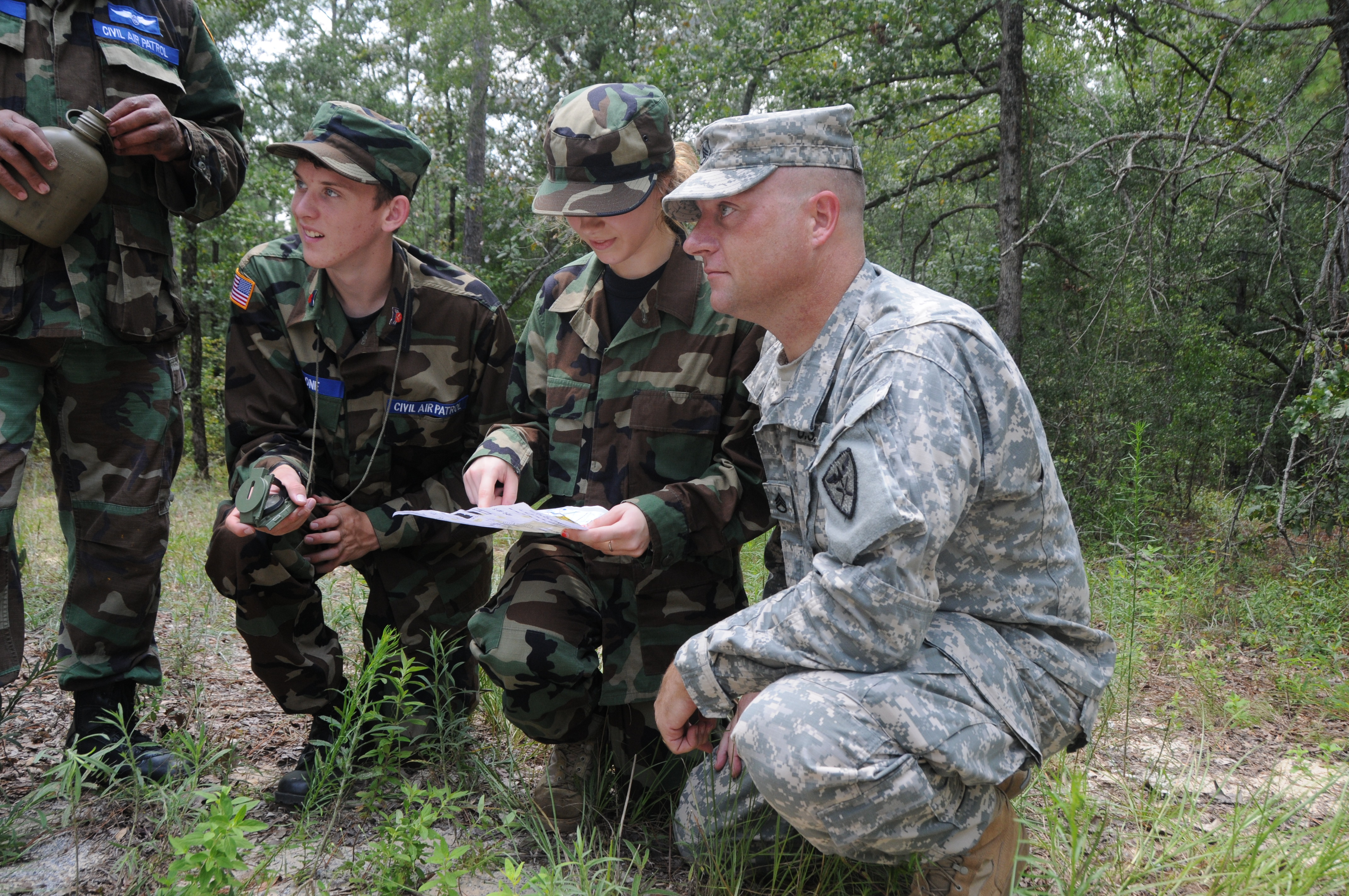
Staff Sgt. Vernon McNabb, B Com., 1st Bn., 13th Avn. Regt., helps two cadets locate their next point during a land navigation exercise.

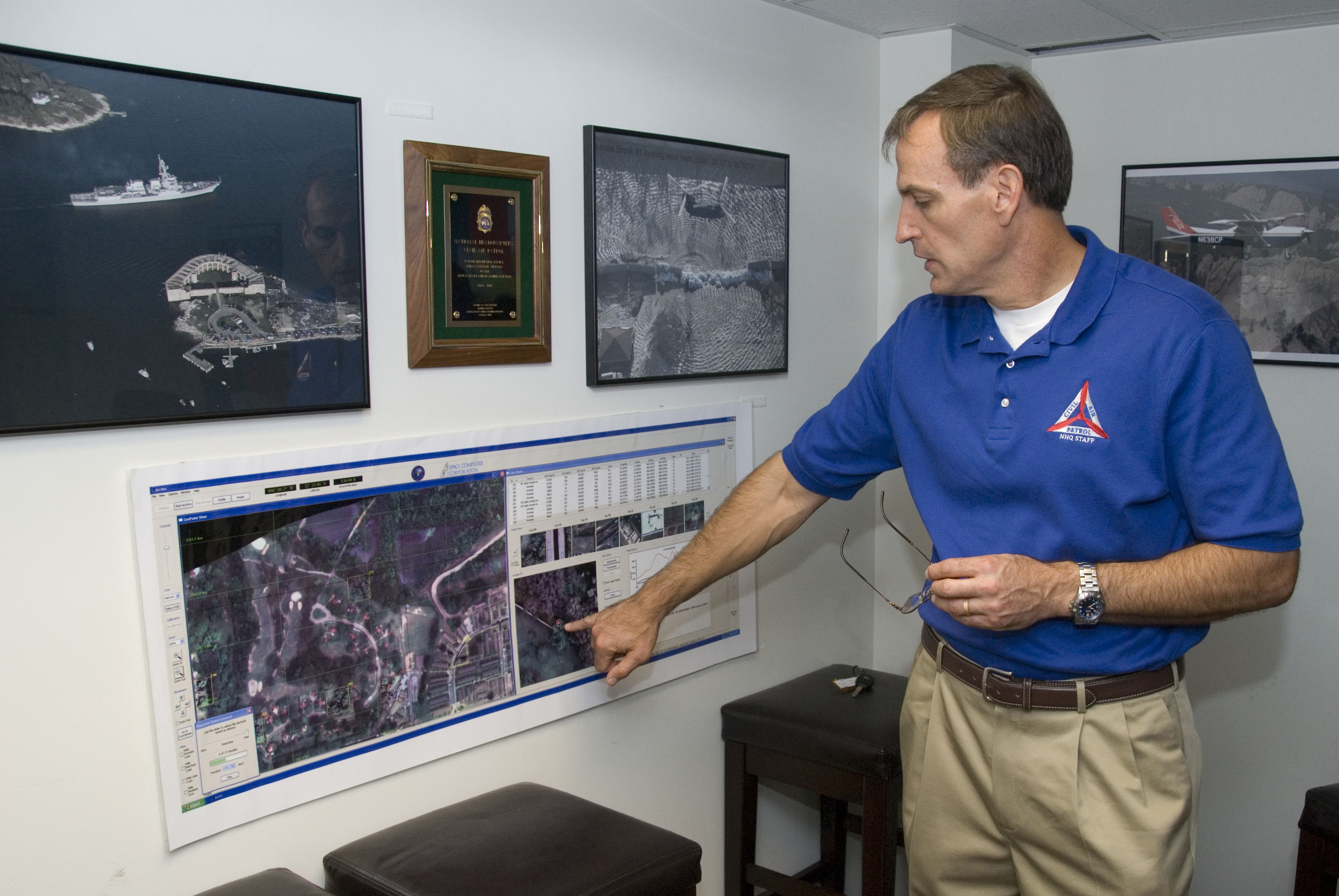
John Salvador, Civil Air Patrol's director of operations, at the CAP National Operations Center.

Squadrons of the Alabama Wing
Designation	Squadron Name	Location	Commander
SER-AL-100	Headquarters Group 1	North Alabama	Lt Col Bryce Kuykendall
SER-AL-041	Muscle Shoals Senior Squadron	Muscle Shoals	Lt Col Al Boyd
SER-AL-055	Huntsville Senior Squadron	Meridianville	Capt Richard Weaver
SER-AL-059	Pryor Field Composite Squadron	Decatur	Lt Col Greg Wood
SER-AL-099	Etowah County Cadet Squadron	Gadsden	1Lt Michael Patty
SER-AL-119	Redstone Composite Squadron	Huntsville	Lt Col Bryce Kuykendall
SER-AL-134	Gen Joe Wheeler Composite Squadron	Hartselle	Lt Col David Stoner
SER-AL-135	Mountain Lakes Composite Squadron	Guntersville	Lt Col Ben Booth
SER-AL-200	Headquarters Group 2	South Alabama	Maj George Yarchak
SER-AL-005	Mobile Composite Squadron	Mobile	Capt John Hoffman
SER-AL-029	Dothan Composite Squadron	Dothan	Maj Joseph Smallen
SER-AL-032	Maxwell Composite Squadron	Maxwell Air Force Base	1st Lt Robert Dana
SER-AL-113	Auburn Composite Squadron	Auburn	Maj Nancy Carlson
SER-AL-300	Headquarters Group 3	Central Alabama	Col Mike Oakman
SER-AL-024	Tuscaloosa Composite Squadron	Tuscaloosa	Maj Eric Williams
SER-AL-087	Bessemer Composite Squadron	Bessemer	Lt Col Kyle Buchina
SER-AL-090	117th ANG Composite Squadron	Birmingham	Maj Thad Mullins
SER-AL-118	Pell City Senior Squadron	Pell City	Capt Barry Colley
SER-AL-126	Springville Cadet Squadron	Springville	Lt Col Steve Minkin
SER-AL-132	Central Alabama Senior Squadron	Pelham	Lt Col John Jerman
SER-AL-137	Coosa River Flight	Wetumpka	Col Jim Harris

== Legal protection ==
Civil Air Patrol members who are employed within the borders of Alabama are entitled to military leave of absence from their employment "without loss of pay, time, efficiency rating, annual vacation, or sick leave" under the Code of Alabama § 31-2-13 when training or other service related to Civil Air Patrol.

== See also ==
- 1st Air Force
- Civil Air Patrol
- History of Civil Air Patrol
