= VQ-11 =

VQ-11, nicknamed the Bandits, was a Fleet Air Reconnaissance Squadron of the U.S. Naval Air Reserve. Originally established at Naval Air Station WillowGrove, Pennsylvania and later moved to NAS Brunswick, Maine, were there establishment ceremony was held on 1 July 1997 and disestablished less than three years later, on 31 March 2000. It was the Naval Air Reserve's first and only Fleet Air Reconnaissance Squadron, but it did not actually perform reconnaissance. Instead, it simulated hostile electronic warfare threats by radar jamming and communications jamming during fleet training exercises.

The squadron's aircraft consisted of two EP-3J Orions that had originally been operated for the same purpose by active duty VAQ-33, and one Orion PC-3 variant, operated as a crew training and logistics plane. The squadron's capability took a major hit when a 1998 oxygen fire on the ground removed one of the EP-3Js from service. The second one was retired in 1999 as the squadron was preparing for deactivation. The remaining P-3C was transferred to VP-92 also stationed in Brunswick, Maine.

== Squadron history ==
The squadron's name "Bandits" originates from VP-VP-66 Liberty Bell's Detachment.66. This detachment was formed after the squadron received the two EP-3J Electronic Orion aircraft. The servicemembers of Detachment 66 named themselves "VQ-66 Bandits". While being stationed at NAS WillowGrove, Pennsylvania until mid 1997 the United States Naval Air Reserve decided to form their own EP-3J Electronic Orion squadron. The squadron patch of VQ-11 was created by the servicemembers of VQ-66 "Bandits".

== See also ==
- History of the United States Navy
- List of inactive United States Navy aircraft squadrons
