= VP-66 =

Patrol squadron of the U.S. Navy Reserve

Patrol Squadron 66
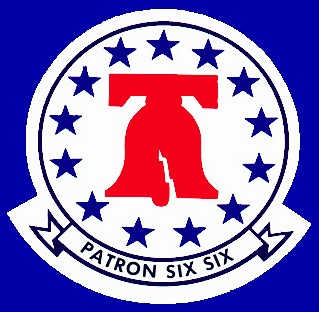
- VP-66 patch
- Active: 1 November 1970-4 March 2006
- Country: United States of America
- Branch: United States Navy Reserve
- Type: squadron
- Role: Maritime patrol
- Nickname(s): Flying Sixes; Dicemen; Liberty Bells

Aircraft flown
- Patrol: SP-2H Neptune; P-3A/B/C Orion; EP-3J Orion

VP-66 was a patrol squadron of the U.S. Navy Reserve. The squadron was established on 1 November 1970 at NAS Willow Grove, Pennsylvania, where it was based for the rest of its life. It was disestablished on 31 March 2006, after 25 years of service. The squadron's nicknames were the Flying Sixes from 1971 to 1974, the Dicemen from 1975 to 1980, and the Liberty Bells from 1981 onward. Elements of the squadron made 19 major overseas deployments.

== Operational history ==
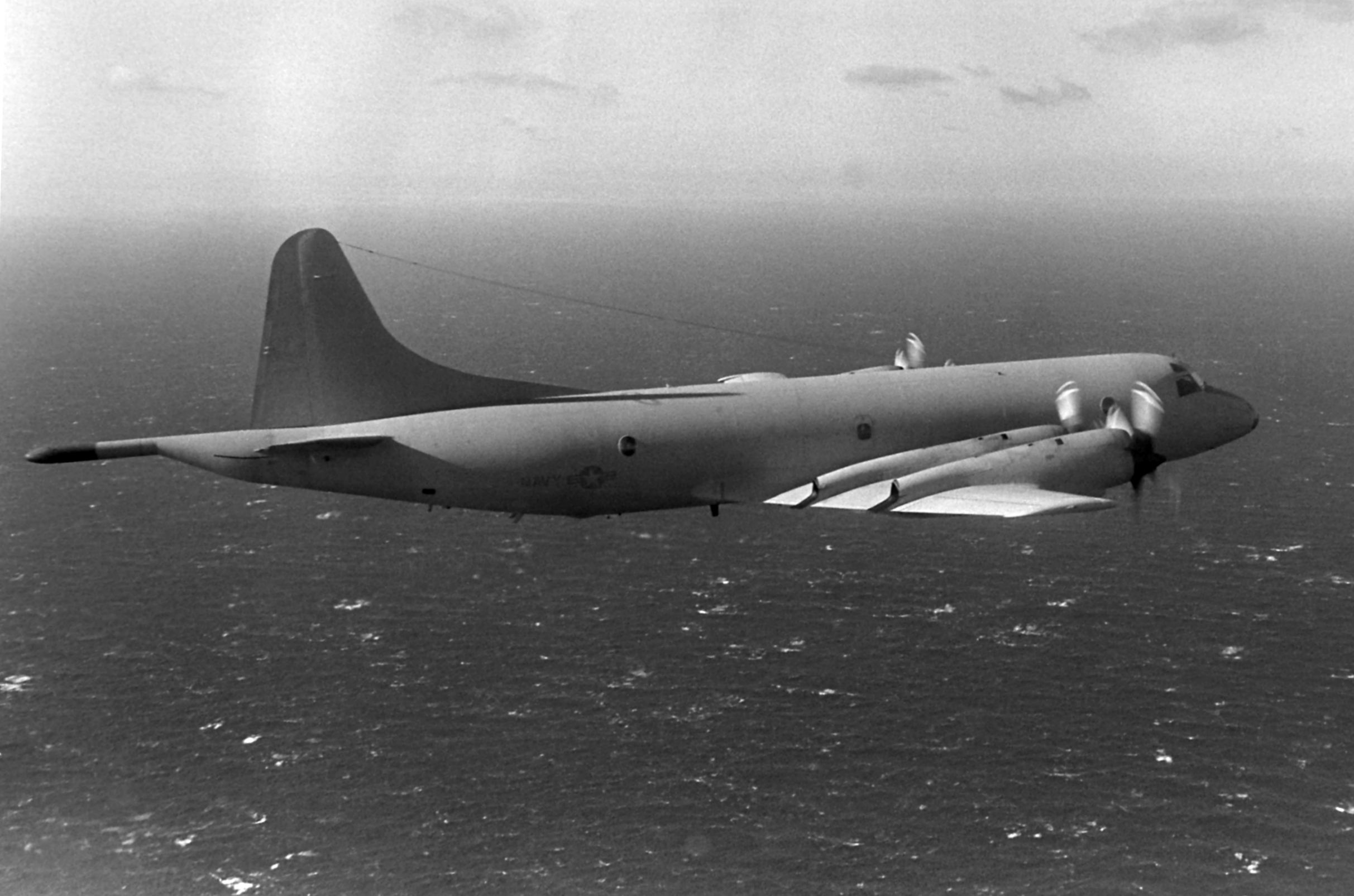
VP-66 P-3B in 1990

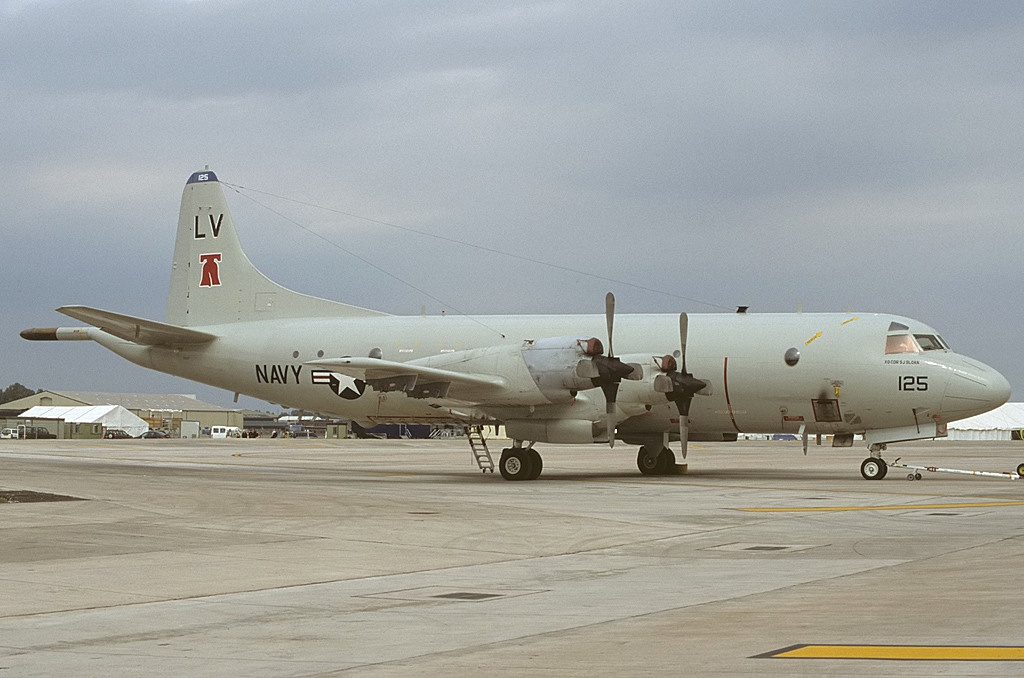
VP-66 P-3C at RAF Fairford in July 2002

- 1 November 1970: VP-66 was established at NAS Willow Grove, as a naval reserve patrol squadron flying the SP-2H Neptune. The squadron was formed from VP-62R1-R3, VP-18R4, VP-44R5 and VP-16R6 after the closure of the facility at NARTC New York, N.Y. The new squadron came under the operational and administrative control of Commander, Naval Air Reserve Forces, Atlantic and Commander, Fleet Air Reserve Wings, Atlantic. VP-66 was established as a result of a major reorganization of Naval Air Reserve that took place in 1970. Twelve reserve squadrons were formed and structured along the lines of regular Navy squadrons with nearly identical organization and manning levels. The reorganization concept was known as 12/2/1. The 12 VP squadrons were under two commands, COMFAIRESWINGLANT and COMFAIRESWINGPAC, and they were under the control of one central authority, Commander Naval Air Reserve.
- January 1971: VP-66 split into two sections, port and starboard, to facilitate crew training and aircraft maintenance with drills twice a month.
- January–May 1978: A new facility, Hangar 175, was completed at NAS Willow Grove for VP-66. The squadron completed final movement into the new hangar with official acceptance ceremonies on 21 May 1978.
- June 1980: VP-66 was called upon to provide support to the fleet during the Mariel Boatlift operations. Personnel deployed in the operation were given the Humanitarian Service Medal.
- 23 January–22 February 1982: VP-66 conducted its annual active duty training at NAS Bermuda. Upon return, the squadron began transition to the P-3A TAC/NAV MOD airframe. The TAC/NAV MOD version in 1975 replaced the ASN-42 inertial navigation system and tactical display systems with an LTN-72 inertial and Omega navigation system and digital computer. The IRDS/HACLS modifications added infrared detection and Harpoon launch capability to the aircraft.
- May 1983: VP-66 received a Navy Meritorious Unit Commendation for its performance in tracking Soviet submarines during the 1982 active duty training at NAS Bermuda.
- 1–30 March 1984: VP-66 became the first reserve P-3A TAC/NAV MOD squadron to deploy in the Atlantic, operating from Lajes Field, Azores, with detachments at NAS Bermuda and NAS Keflavik, Iceland.
- 9–17 November 1985: A detachment from VP-66 participated in Operation Hat Trick II, operating out of Naval Station Roosevelt Roads, Puerto Rico. It was a coordinated operation with the U.S. Coast Guard in the war against illegal drug traffic, involving general area surveillance and location of suspect vessels.
- February–March 1987: VP-66 deployed to Naval Station Rota, Spain, the first Reserve squadron to deploy to this site in over six years. Detachments were maintained during the active duty training at Naval Air Station Sigonella, Sicily, and NAF Lajes, Azores.
- 20 April 1990: VP-66 began transition from the P-3A TAC/NAV MOD airframe to the P-3B TAC/NAV MOD. The P-3B had more powerful engines and improved avionics.
- 20 February–6 April 1991: VP-66 deployed to NAS Bermuda, with remote site operations conducted at Goose Bay, Newfoundland, and Thule, Greenland, as part of Operation Icex-92. One highly unusual aspect of the deployment was the coordinated rescue effort of a French seaman by a VP-66 aircrew and the crew of a Commonwealth of Independent States Kilo-class submarine. The French sailboat Vibel had an injured crewman aboard. The VP-66 aircraft guided the former Soviet vessel to the French sailboat where medical treatment was given to the injured crewman.
- 1993: With the disestablishment of VAQ-33, VP-66 inherited two EP-3J aircraft, a formidable electronic warfare platform. The addition of these aircraft to the squadron resulted in a concomitant increase in manning levels to support the new mission being acquired.
- 1993: VP-66 deployed to NS Rota, with a detachment at NAF Sigonella. The Sigonella detachment was heavily involved in support of the UN peacekeeping forces in Bosnia-Herzegovina.
- 1994: VP-66 deployed to NS Roosevelt Roads, to provide support of UN forces during the embargo of Haiti.

== Aircraft assignment ==
The squadron first received the following aircraft on the dates shown:

- SP-2H Neptune – November 1970
- P-3A Orion – March 1973
- P-3A TAC/NAV MOD Orion – March 1982
- P-3B TAC/NAV MOD Orion – April 1980
- EP-3J Orion – 1993
- P-3C Orion – 31 May 1994

== See also ==
- Maritime patrol aircraft
- List of Lockheed P-3 Orion variants
- List of inactive United States Navy aircraft squadrons
- List of United States Navy aircraft squadrons
- List of squadrons in the Dictionary of American Naval Aviation Squadrons
- History of the United States Navy
