= 476th =

476th may refer to:

- 476th Bombardment Squadron, inactive United States Air Force unit
- 476th Fighter Group, United States Air Force Reserve unit, stationed at Moody Air Force Base, Georgia
- 476th Tactical Fighter Squadron, inactive United States Air Force unit

== See also ==
- 476 (number)
- 476 (disambiguation)
- 476, the year 476 (CDLXXVI) of the Julian calendar
- 476 BC
