= Pennsylvania Wing Civil Air Patrol =

- Pennsylvania Wing of Civil Air Patrol

Associated branches
- United States Air Force

Command staff
- Commander: Col Leslie Herr
- Deputy Commander: Lt Col Steve Aaron Lt Col Gregg Rubright
- Chief of Staff: Lt Col Randy Lentz
- Senior Enlisted Leader: SMSgt Brad Kenny

Current statistics
- Cadets: 811
- Seniors: 869
- Total Membership: 1680
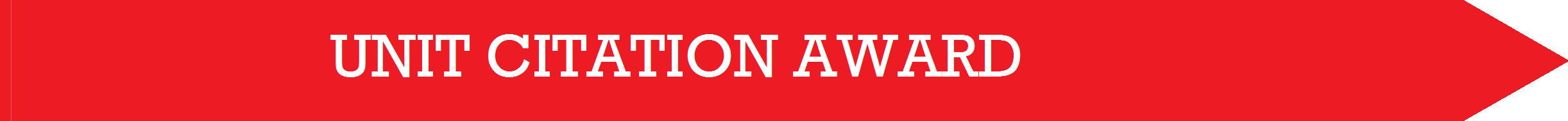
- Awards: Unit Citation Award
- Website: pawg.cap.gov
- Statistics as of November 20, 2024

The Pennsylvania Wing of the Civil Air Patrol (CAP) is the highest echelon of CAP in Pennsylvania. Pennsylvania Wing headquarters is located at Fort Indiantown Gap, an Army National Guard installation near Harrisburg, Pennsylvania. Pennsylvania Wing is abbreviated as "PAWG", and is often referred to by its members as "PA Wing". A Pennsylvania keystone is a symbol commonly used in patches and designs of PAWG.

== History ==
Pennsylvania Wing is one of the original 48 wings in Civil Air Patrol.

In the spring of 1942, the Pennsylvania Wing conducted a 30-day experiment with the intention of convincing the Army Air Forces that they were capable of flying cargo missions for the nation. PA Wing transported Army cargo as far as Georgia, and top Army officials were impressed. After the 30 day trial period, the War Department gave CAP permission to conduct courier and cargo service for the military, often flying mail, light cargo, and important military officials between USAAF bases.

One of the Civil Air Patrol's very first "Aviation Cadet Programs" was established at the Pittsburgh Army Air Field in the spring of 1943. Accepting young men as "Aviation Cadets" in a delayed enlistment program for the Army Air Forces, the Pittsburgh Squadron trained these boys (as young as 15) in Aerospace and Military subjects and vetted them for service as Army Air Force Pilots. Graduating a total of 16 Aviation Cadets for the Army in less than ten months, the Pittsburgh Squadron model was copied by units in Philadelphia, New York City and as far south as Florida. Today, the current Squadron with direct lineage to that Aviation Cadet Unit is the CAP's second longest, continually operated unit on a Military Installation.

On December 31, 1999, PA Wing units were put on stand-by in case of any problems arising from the Y2K bug.

During the September 11 attacks, Pennsylvania Wing was ordered to a stand-by state. Although not officially tasked with any missions in direct support, PAWG radio communications centers were operational and prepared to offer assistance.

In 2006, PA Wing was activated to fly reconnaissance missions during the 2006 flood. PAWG aircraft flew over major waterways to provide detailed photographs of flood-affected areas and to monitor floodwaters as they moved downstream.

31 Members from Pennsylvania Wing Civil Air Patrol traveled 28 hours to Pascagoula, Mississippi to aid in Hurricane Katrina relief efforts. PAWG Ground Teams went door-to-door ensuring that local residents had adequate food, water, and medical care.

In August and September 2011, all CAP emergency service teams in Pennsylvania Wing and CAP members from Maryland, Ohio, West Virginia, and Indiana Wings were activated to assist communities affected by Hurricane Irene (2011) and Tropical Storm Lee (2011).

During the time between September 1, 2010 to December 1, 2011, the Pennsylvania Wing saved eleven lives, provided emergency response in Pennsylvania during the 2011 flooding and severe winter storms.

In November 2012, CAP Pennsylvania Wing emergency services air crews and ground teams were activated to assist communities in Pennsylvania, New Jersey, New York, and Delaware during flooding and high wind of Hurricane Sandy.

During Late December 2017 and early January 2018, CAP Pennsylvania Wing emergency services ground teams were sent to help dig out Erie Pennsylvania.

In March 2021, as a part of Civil Air Patrol's response in combating the COVID-19 pandemic, members of Pennsylvania Wing provided support at a vaccine point of distribution.

=== Pennsylvania Wing Commanders ===
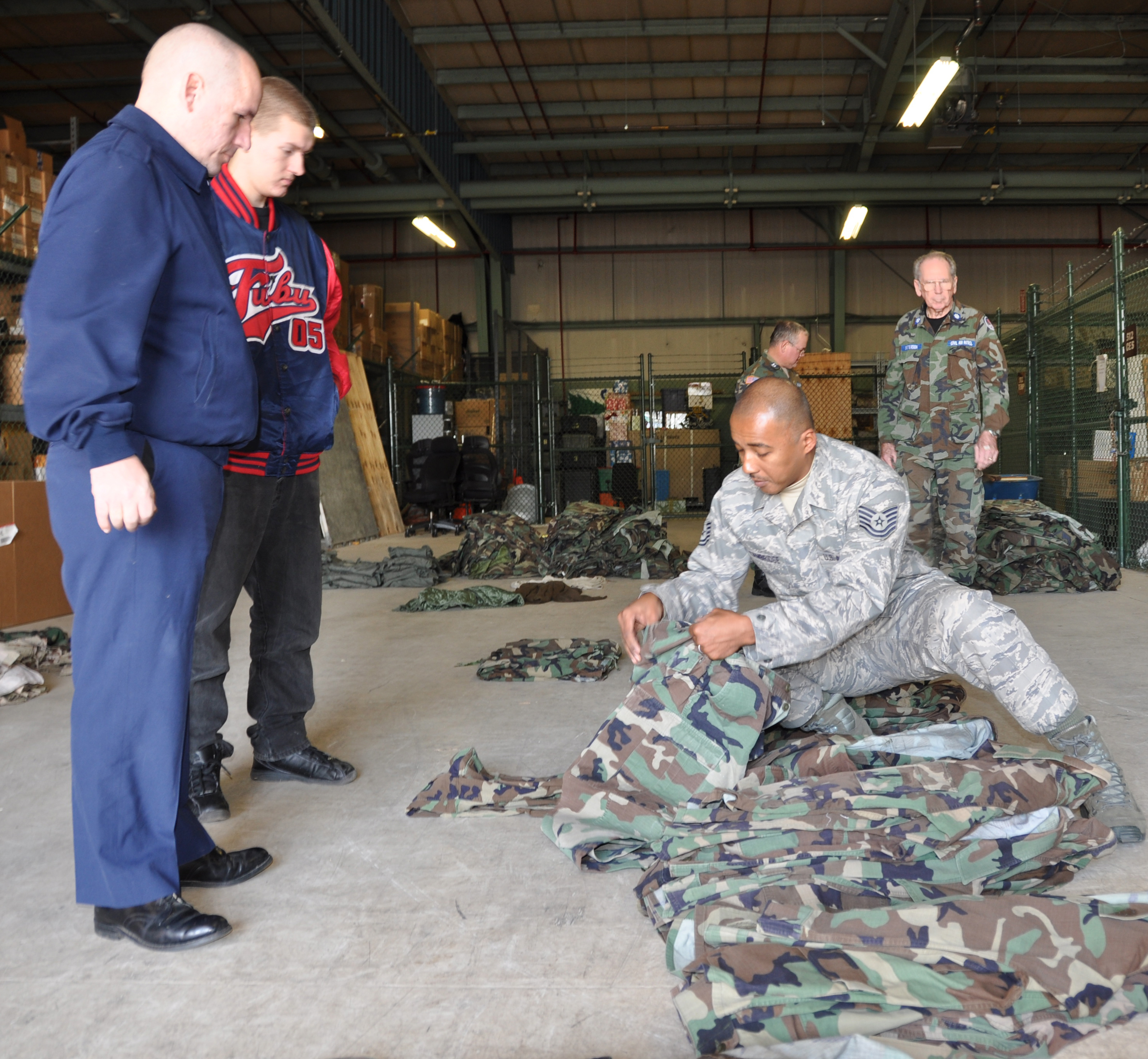
CAP volunteers collect uniforms donated to Delaware and Pennsylvania CAP units by the Delaware National Guard.

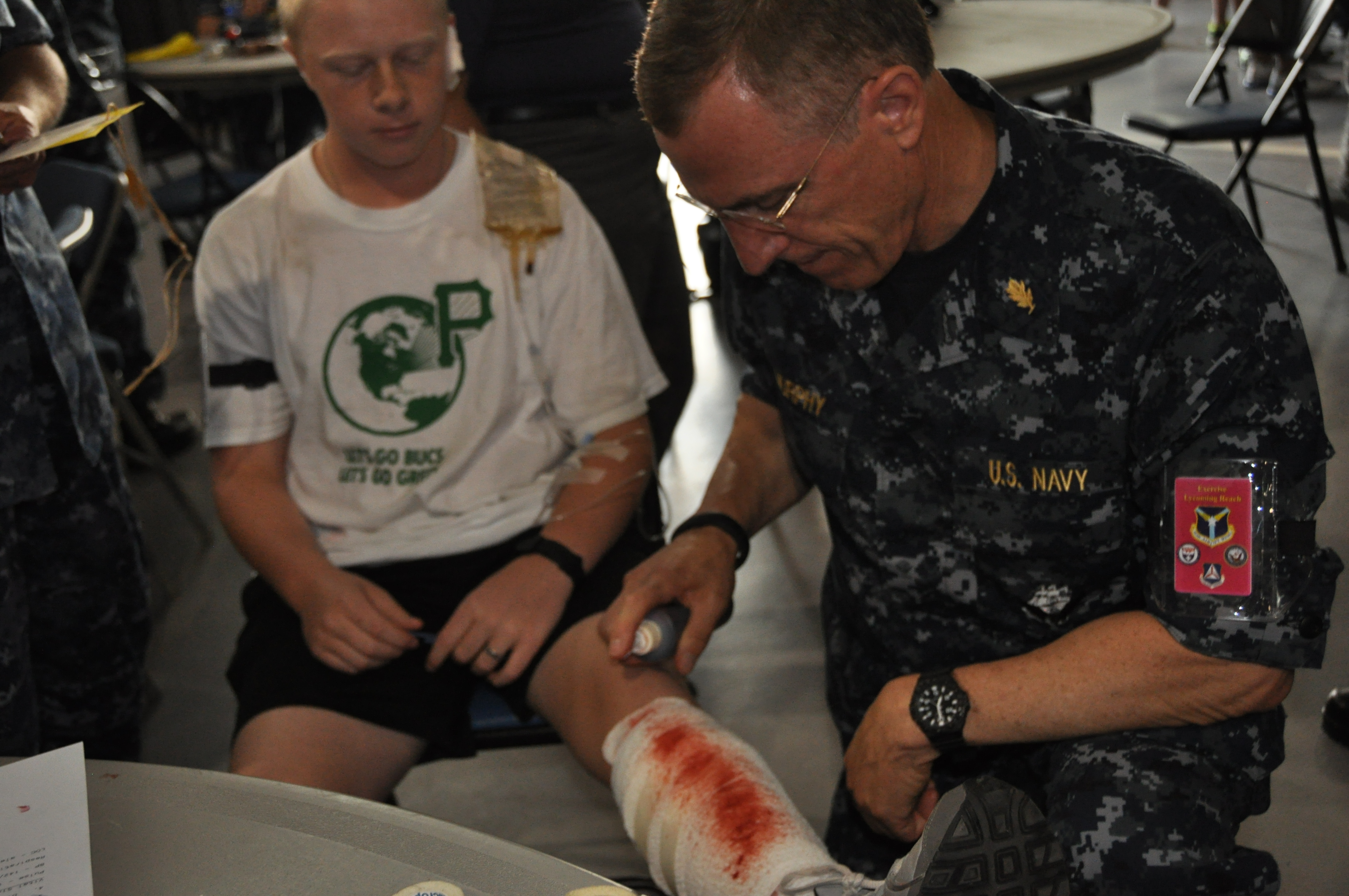
Lt. Cmdr. Tim Murphy, psychologist with the Navy Reserve Medical Service Corps at Walter Reed National Military Medical Center at Bethesda, sprays fake blood on the bandages of a Pennsylvania Wing Civil Air Patrol Cadet as part of preparation for a National Disaster Medical System Exercise.

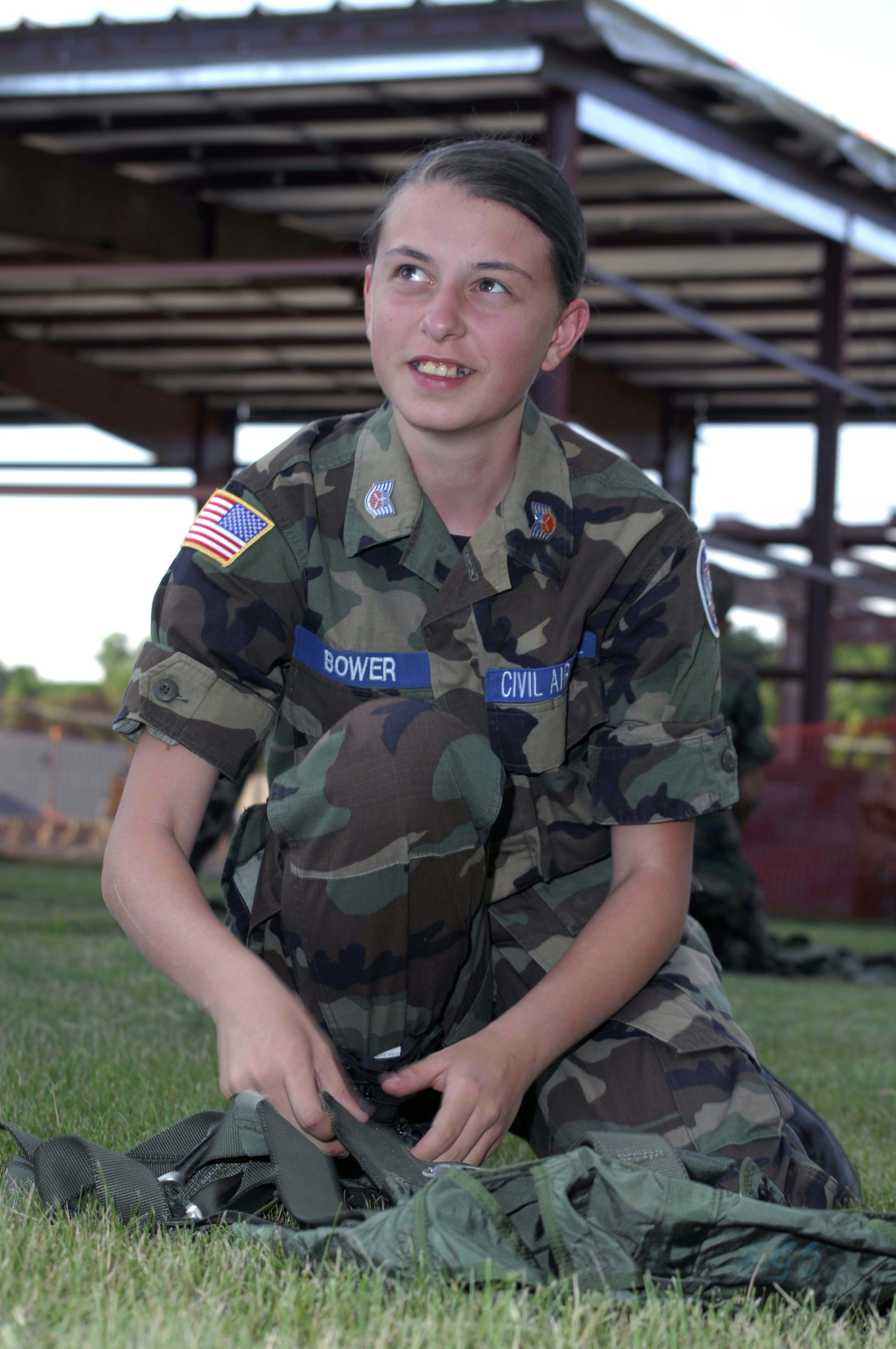
Cadet Tech. Sgt. Jessica Bower, with the Civil Air Patrol Harrisburg International Composite Squadron 306, listens on how to adjust a parachute harness.

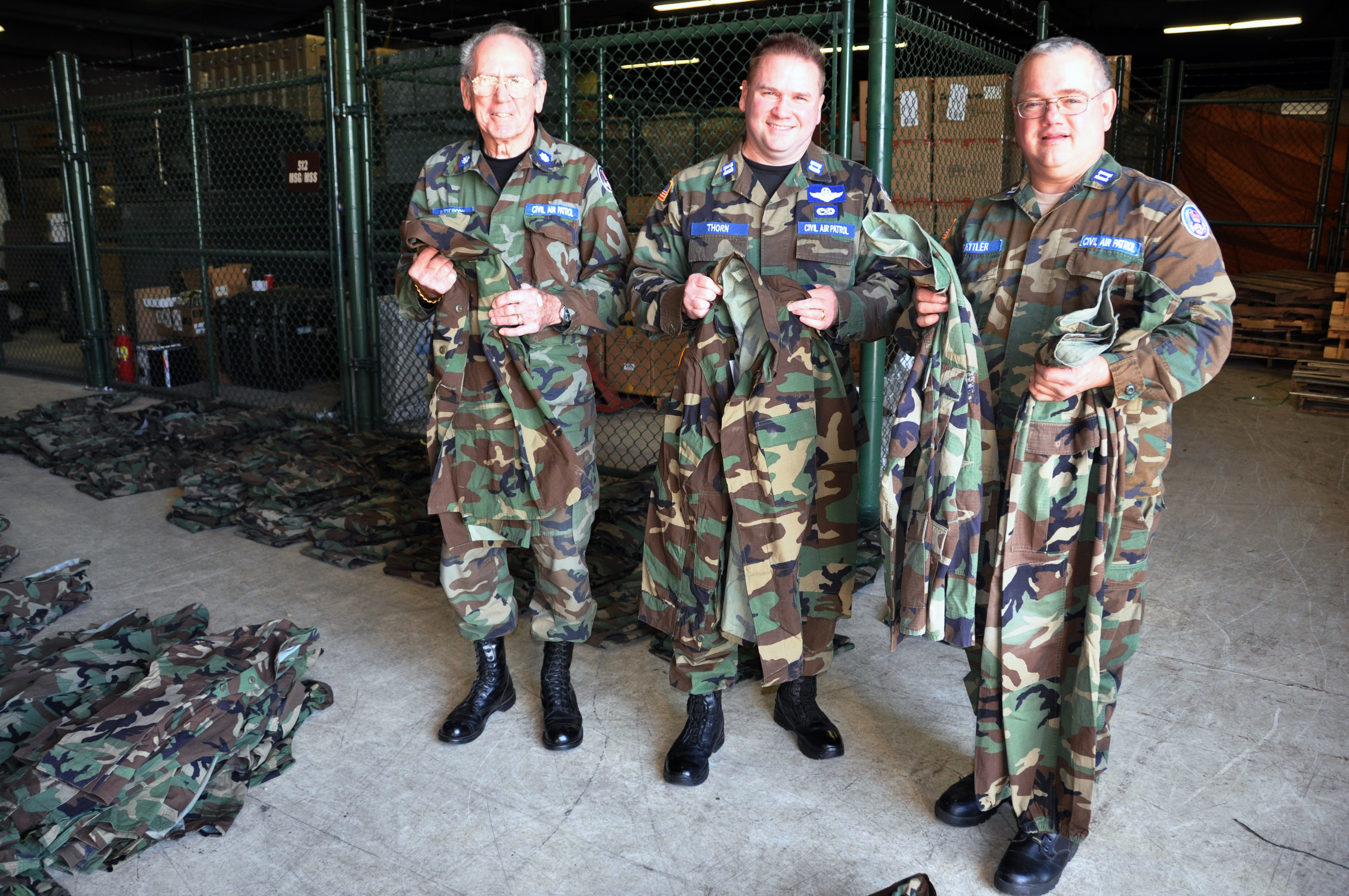
From left to right: Civil Air Patrol members Lt. Col. Jerry Patterson, Capt. Bob Thorn, and Capt. Frank Sattler, who are holding battle dress uniforms donated from the 512th Airlift Wing to Delaware and Pennsylvania CAP units at Dover Air Force Base in Dover, Delaware in January 2012

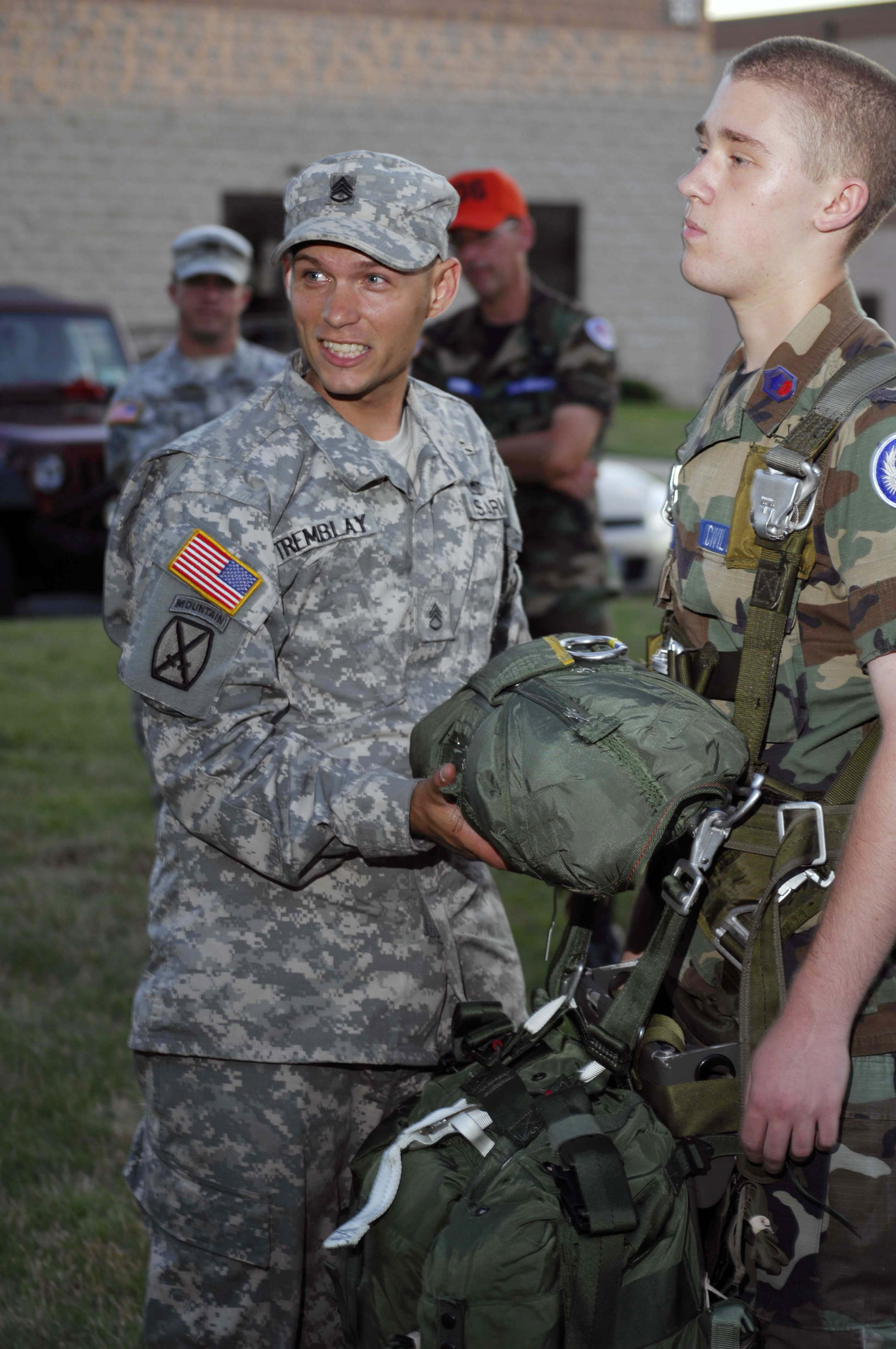
Staff Sgt. Joseph Tremblay shows how to rig the combat equipment onto a parachute jumper with assistance from Cadet Chief Master Sgt. Joseph Dempsey, Pennsylvania Wing Civil Air Patrol.

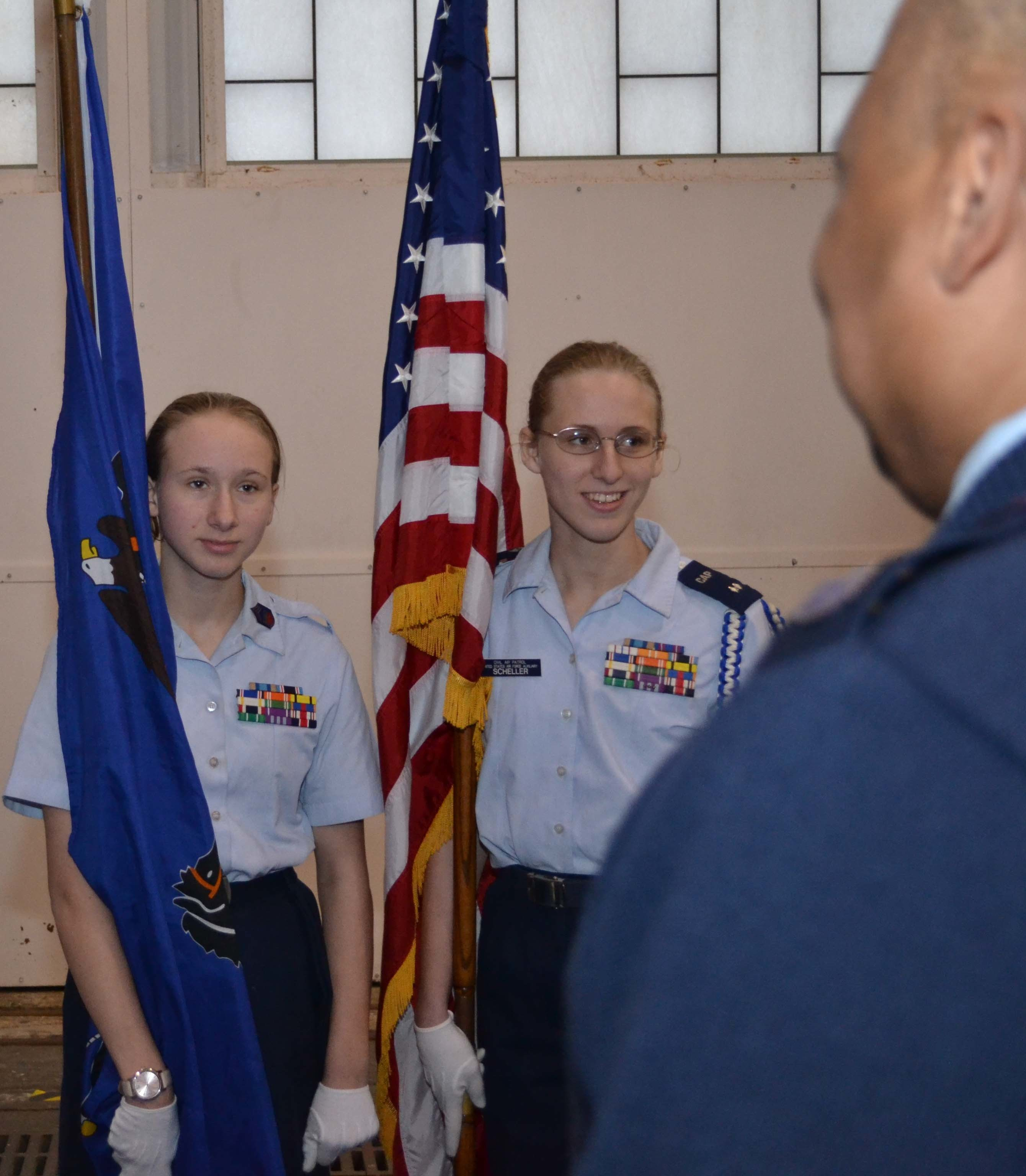
Members of the Civil Air Patrol Squadron 801 Honor Guard in Allentown, Pennsylvania, listen to instruction given by retired Tech. Sgt. Anthony Kearse.

1. Lt. Col. William L. Anderson — December 1, 1941 to August 18, 1945
2. Lt. Col. Philip F. Neuweiler — August 18, 1945 to March 26, 1946
3. Lt. Col. Carl A. Reber — March 26, 1946 to August 15, 1947
4. Col. Philip F. Neuweiler — August 15, 1947 to March 21, 1970
5. Col. Angelo A. Milano — March 22, 1970 to November 5, 1977
6. Temp. Col. Andrew E. Skiba — November 5, 1977 to June 28, 1978
7. Lt. Col. Edward T. Kelly (Int.) — June 28, 1978 to January 1, 1979
8. Col. Angelo A. Milano — January 1, 1979 to December 7, 1987
9. Col. Raymond F. Schuler — December 7, 1987 to February 16, 1990
10. Col. M. Allen Applebaum — February 16, 1990 to November 14, 1990
11. Col. Larry Kauffman — November 14, 1990 to November 20, 1993
12. Col. Joseph A. Guimond, Jr. — November 20, 1993 to August 19, 1995
13. Col. Jean-Pierre J. Habets — August 19, 1995 to August 15, 1999
14. Col. Fredric K. Weiss — August 15, 1999 to June 14, 2003
15. Col. M. Allen Applebaum — June 14, 2003 to September 29, 2007
16. Col. Mark A. Lee — September 29, 2007 to November 12, 2011
17. Col. Sandra E. Brandon — November 12, 2011 to May 16, 2015
18. Col. Gary Fleming — May 16, 2015 to May 18, 2019
19. Col. Kevin Berry — May 18, 2019 to May 1, 2023
20. Col William A. Schlosser — May 1, 2023 to May 18, 2026
21. Col Leslie G. Herr - May 18, 2026 - Present

=== Pennsylvania Spaatz Awards ===
#10	Michael F. S. Hanford	2/14/1966
#47	Kenneth B. Hibbert	9/12/1967
#62	Ramon L. Benedetto	5/16/1968
#74	Michael A. Allen	11/22/1968
#79	Richard B. Smith	1/7/1969
#88	James I. Heald	5/15/1969
#104	Paul S. Draper	1/14/1970
#105	Harry Z. Mertz	1/14/1970
#116	Gary J. Kirkpatrick	5/14/1970
#166	Roy K. Salomon	4/11/1972
#171	Marie E. Stutz	6/28/1972
#174	Donald P. Flinn	7/24/1972
#205	Mark L. Sweeney	3/15/1973
#220	George S. Rose	6/18/1973
#230	Robert P. Pellegrini	8/20/1973
#299	Gary P. Standorf	11/7/1974
#314	Keith D. Kries	3/7/1975
#423	Konrad J. Trautman	2/14/1977
#445	Robert J. Mattes	10/20/1977
#452	Lawrence L. Trick	11/22/1977
#463	Jerrold J. Warthman	3/10/1978
#480	Richard A. Magners	7/30/1978
#484	Richard E. Graves	8/22/1978
#495	James L. Kraftchak	1/2/1979
#510	William C. Snee	5/1/1979
#532	Bryan L. Watson	11/13/1979
#533	Robert L. Atwell	11/16/1979
#534	Terry Hawes	11/19/1979
#553	Jeff L. Riley	8/8/1980
#554	Terry N. Friend	9/3/1980
#558	Tim Hawes	10/27/1980
#570	Richard C. Yingling	5/6/1981
#583	R. Steven Rickert	10/7/1981
#613	Edward W. Czeck	6/25/1982
#625	Sean E. Neal	12/13/1982
#626	Anthony R. Sodano	12/17/1982
#691	Walter J. Cornett III	4/10/1984
#738	Kurt J. Hack	2/28/1985
#783	Robert J. Lutz	1/22/1986
#797	Daniel B. Weston	5/8/1986
#815	David M. Mertes	9/5/1986
#882	Paul R. Andrew	4/6/1988
#889	John D. Angeny	7/1/1988
#935a	Lawrence L. Stouffer	4/18/1989
#950	John J. Talaber	8/8/1989
#957	Henry W. Lutz	8/29/1989
#1007	William A. Davis	6/12/1990
#1043	Kerim M. Yasar	1/16/1991
#1073	Joseph F. Shirer	8/27/1991
#1074	Randy K. Lentz	8/27/1991
#1081	Isaac J. Zortman	11/21/1991
#1083	Richard E. Gray	12/9/1991
#1101	Nathaniel J. Szewczyk	2/25/1992
#1153	Kara M. Grimaldi	1/18/1993
#1173	Timothy J. Cheslock	6/29/1993
#1174	Sarah J. Ferdinand	6/29/1993
#1236	Julian J. Rivera	1/12/1995
#1282	Julius Armstrong	12/22/1995
#1286	Joel A. Martin	12/30/1995
#1287	Broderick A. Jones	12/30/1995
#1383	Michael T. Bauer	7/19/1998
#1409	Jason Secrest	7/16/1999
#1432	Sean T. Conroy	6/9/2000
#1480	Joshua Plocinski	12/21/2002
#1497	Shawn M. Cressman	3/13/2003
#1590	Erin M. Nelson	2/21/2006
#1631	David J. Spillane	4/21/2007
#1658	Robert A. Nolt	7/26/2007
#1662	Matthew J. Postupack	8/28/2007
#1677	Thomas P. Carr	12/22/2007
#1748	Courtney Gallagher	12/23/2009
#1767	Dane V. Carroll	8/19/2010
#1791	Noah D. Bendele	4/21/2011
#1841	Jake R. Martin	5/31/2012
#1900	Abigail R. Hawkins	8/9/2013
#1949	Ethan J. Dunlap	5/20/2014
#1994	Nicholas A. Cavacini	6/19/2015
#2011	Nicholas G. Basile	8/28/2015
#2023	Jared K. Przelmoski	1/19/2016
#2044	Adam I. Parker	5/17/2016
#2120	Josiah L. Acosta	8/2/2017
#2135	Matthew J Chirik	11/6/2017
#2150	Brandon M. Webber	1/21/2018
#2181	Matthew D. Robinson	6/15/2018
#2188	Peter Collins	7/11/2018
#2193	Mallory Fichera	7/26/2018
#2218	Nolan E. Hulick	1/9/2019
#2220	Andrew G. Myers	2/9/0219
#2250	Andrew S. Wieder	8/10/2019
#2315	Colin T. Phipps	12/29/2020
#2374	Lisa N. Rubright	12/2/2021
#2403	Samantha M. Farah	5/31/2022
#2409	Gwen J. Stahl	7/1/2022
#2430	Ethan J. Phipps	11/11/2022
#2441	Lillian R. Evasew	2/2/2023
#2467	Joshua S. James	7/1/2023
#2487	June M. Acosta	10/6/2023
#2574	Slater J. Shannon	4/5/2025
#2592	Ellabay Perry	6/20/2025
#2604	Evan M. Lentz	8/24/2025

== Structure ==
Pennsylvania Wing is the highest echelon of Civil Air Patrol in Pennsylvania. PA Wing reports to Northeast Region CAP, who reports to CAP National Headquarters.

Pennsylvania Wing Headquarters is located in a renovated former World War Two Post Exchange (PX) and Non Commissioned Officers Club (NCO Club) complex at Fort Indiantown Gap in Annville, Pennsylvania. Offices, classrooms, a communications center and an emergency operations center are located inside the Headquarters. Additionally, the headquarters building is located approximately one mile from Muir Army Airfield.

Reporting to the Wing level, Pennsylvania is divided into six geographic groups. Each group conducts training, activities, classroom learning and programs, with actual missions assigned to a group from the Wing. Originally, the state was divided into three groups (western, central, and eastern); but with an increasing number of squadrons, PAWG divided split each group into northern and southern sections, creating six groups in 2007.

Reporting to each group are 60 squadrons. Squadrons are the local level of organization and serve the local community, and squadrons meet weekly to conduct conducts training, activities, classroom learning and programs to carry out the three missions of Civil Air Patrol - Emergency Services, Cadet Programs, and Aerospace Education.

There are three types of Civil Air Patrol squadrons.

1. A cadet squadron focus primarily on providing for cadets (ages 12 to 21).
2. A senior squadron is a unit dedicated to allowing senior members to focus on CAP's missions.
3. Composite squadrons have both cadets and senior members working together.

As of December 1, 2014, the PA Wing operates 60 squadrons, in six groups, 15 aircraft, 34 ground vehicles and a state-wide radio communications network that is operational 24/7 and is part of a national network.

=== Groups and Squadrons ===
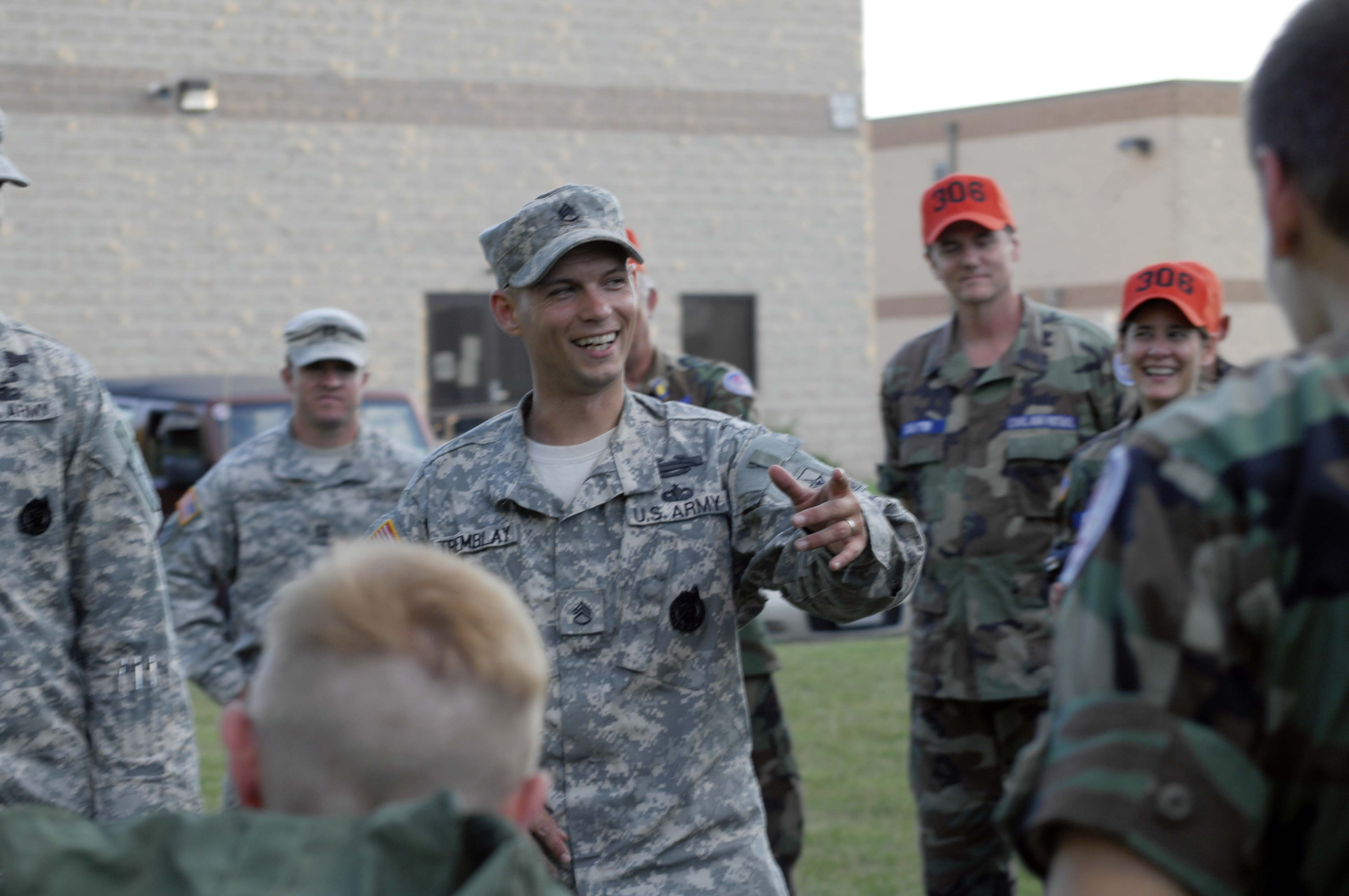
Staff Sgt. Joseph Tremblay tells Civil Air Patrol cadets that they need to yell “AIRBORNE!,” June 29 during training at the 193rd Special Operations Wing Pennsylvania Air National Guard Base.

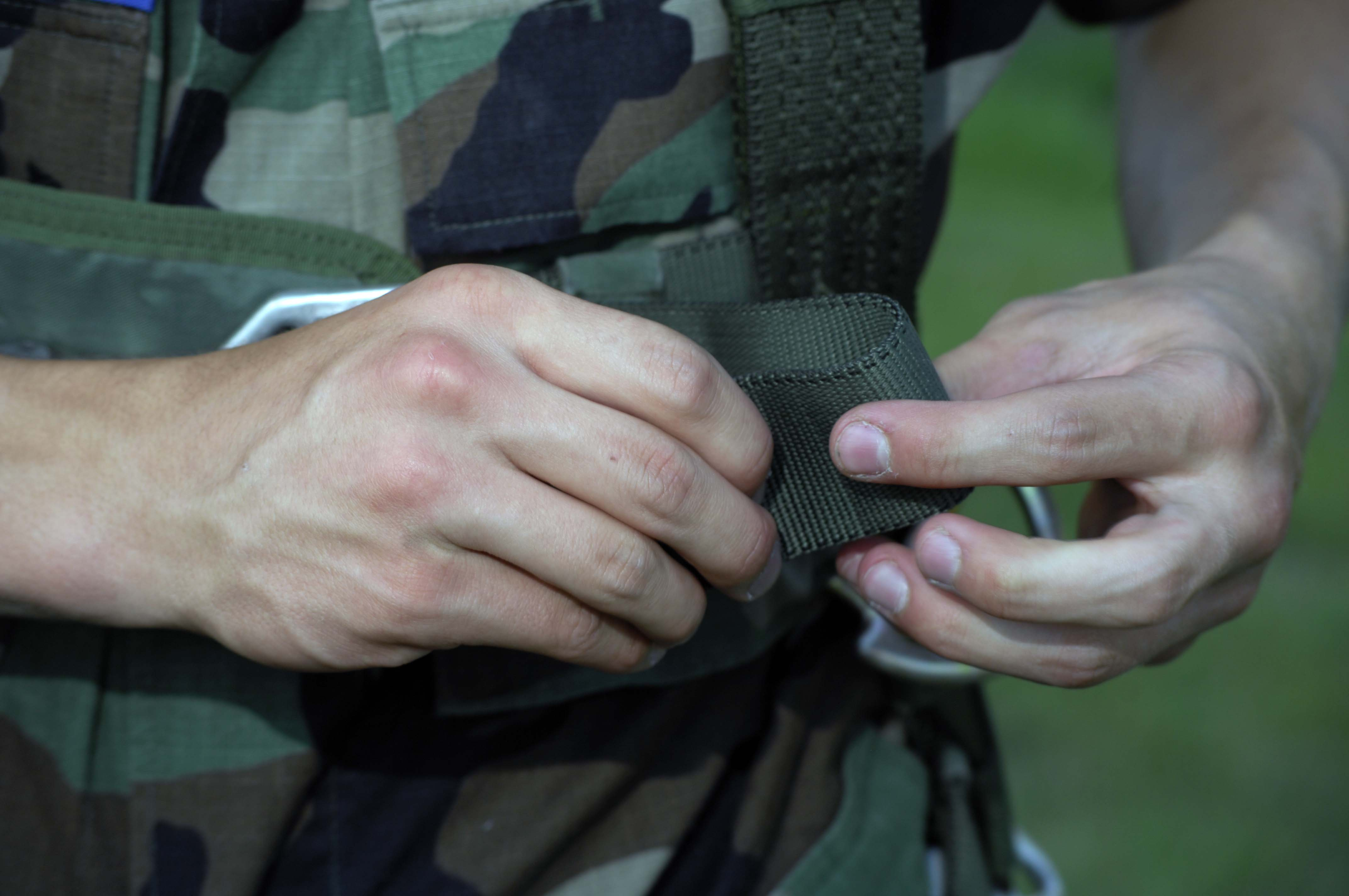
Cadet Senior Airman Jeremy Shaver, Pennsylvania Wing CAP, folds the free running end on the harness’ chest strap.

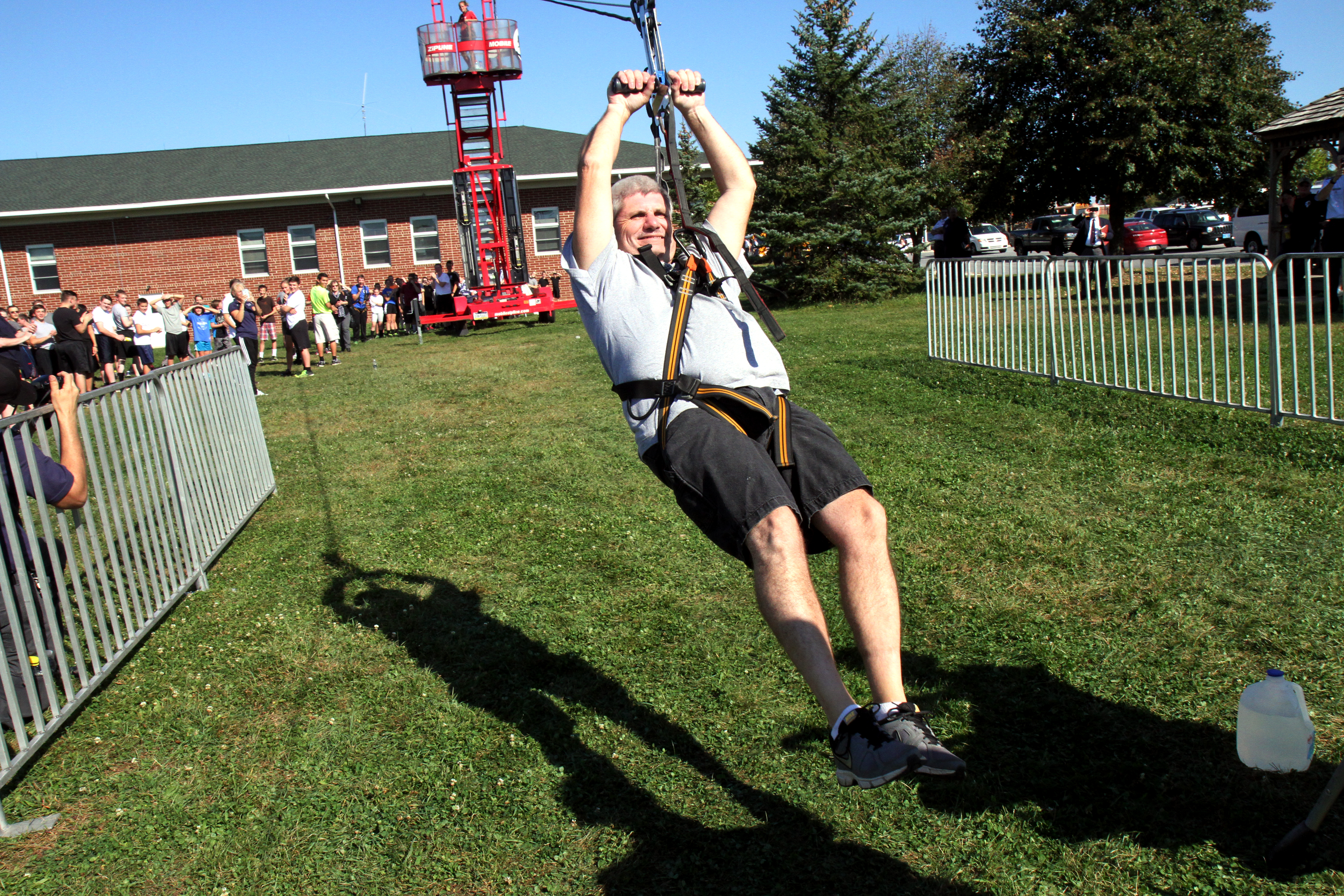
Col. Gary Fleming, wing commander of the Pennsylvania Civil Air Patrol Wing, takes a turn on a mobile zip line.

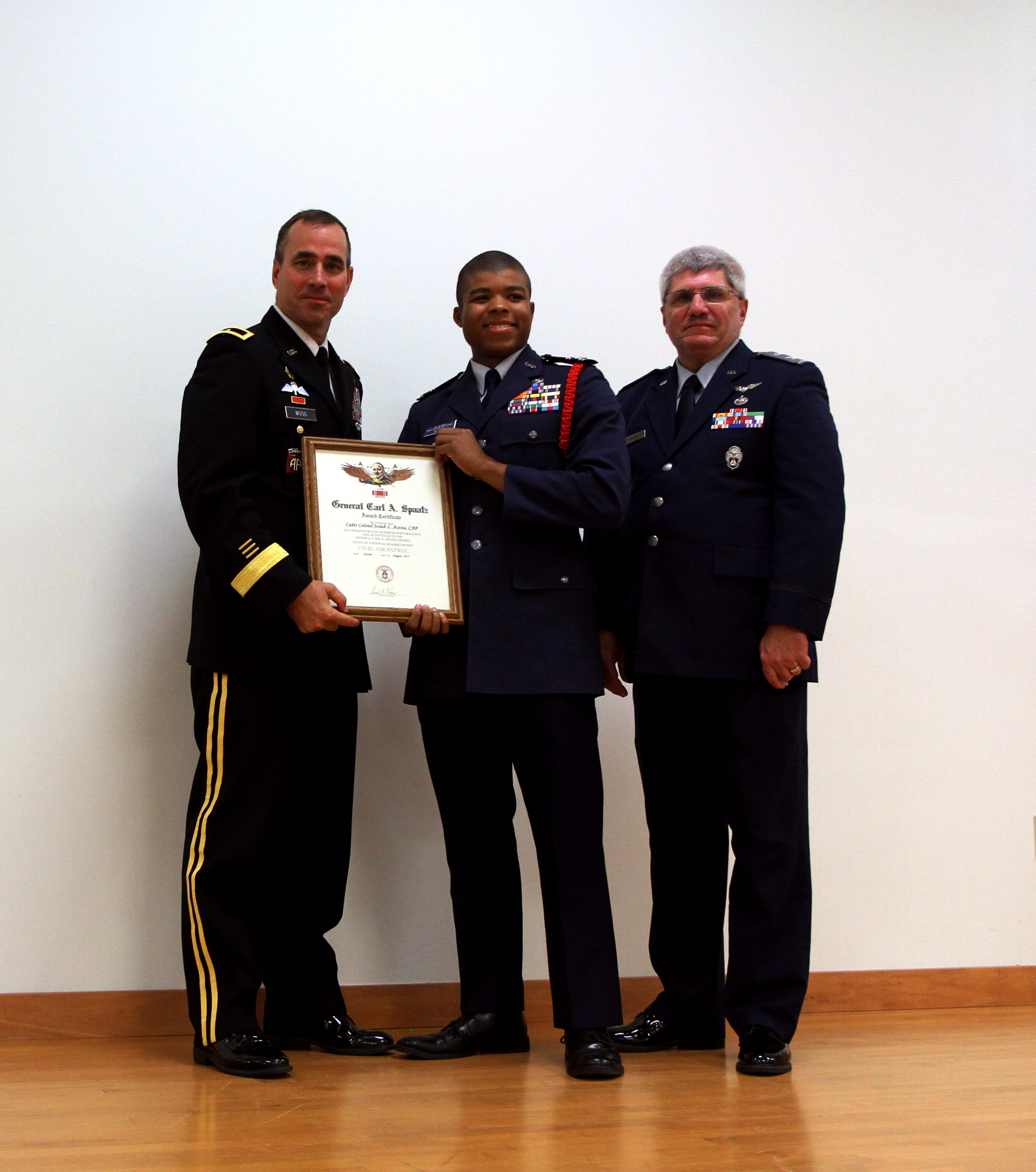
Brig. Gen. David Wood, Pennsylvania National Guard, and Col. Gary Fleming, wing commander of the Pennsylvania Civil Air Patrol Wing, present Cadet Col. Josiah Acosta with the Gen. Carl A. Spaatz Award.

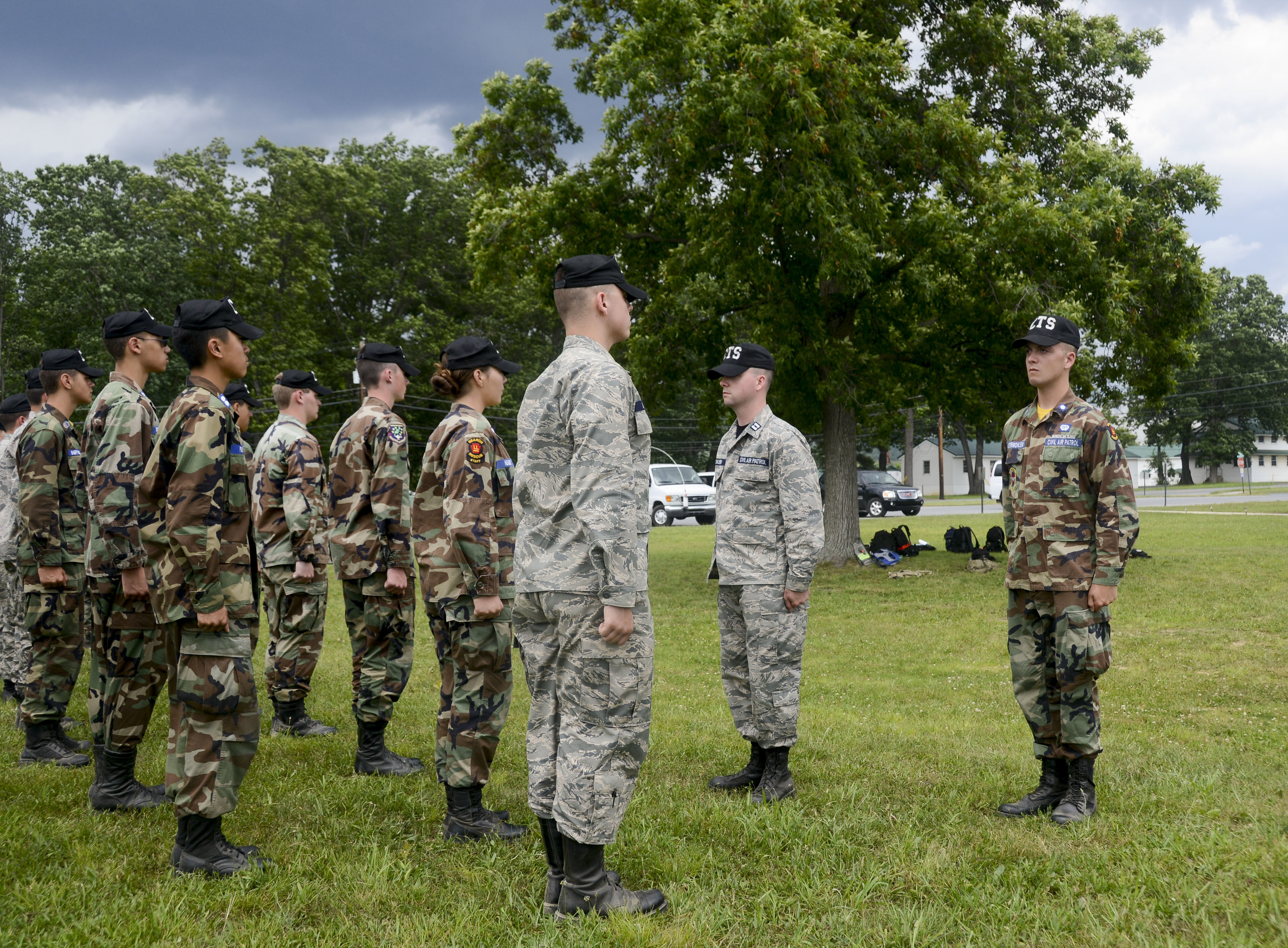
Shawn (left) and Kevin Utermohlen, Pennsylvania Air National Guard, conducted an inspection of a flight of Civil Air Patrol cadets.

==== Group 1 ====
Group 1 is responsible for operations in and around the Pittsburgh area.

Squadron Number	Name/Location/Type	Notes
NER-PA-002	Allegheny County Airport	
NER-PA-025	Allegheny County Composite	
NER-PA-133	Golden Triangle Composite	
NER-PA-190	Butler Composite	
NER-PA-253	Jimmy Stewart Composite	
NER-PA-310	Beaver County Composite	
NER-PA-601	Washington Composite	

==== Group 2 ====
Group 2 operates around Harrisburg.

Squadron Number	Name/Location/Type	Notes
NER-PA-003	Fort Indiantown Gap	
NER-PA-010	Lancaster Composite Squadron	
NER-PA-045	Dauphin County Composite Sqdn	
NER-PA-060	Capital City Composite	
NER-PA-089	Reading Composite	
NER-PA-265	Lebanon Composite Squadron	
NER-PA-308	Gettysburg Composite	

==== Group 3 ====
Group 3 operates in the greater Philadelphia area.

Squadron Number	Name/Location/Type	Notes
NER-PA-004	Willow Grove JRB	
NER-PA-018	General Carl A. Spaatz Composite	
NER-PA-080	Chester County Composite	
NER-PA-105	Griffin Composite Squadron	
NER-PA-160	Willow Grove JRB Composite	
NER-PA-214	Northeast Philadelphia Composite	
NER-PA-301	Liberty Composite Squadron	

==== Group 4 ====
Group 4 conducts operations in the 14 county area of Eastern Pennsylvania from Lower Bucks County to the PA/NY State Border.

Squadron Number	Name/Location/Type	Notes
NER-PA-005	Quakertown Airport	
NER-PA-035	Quakertown Composite	
NER-PA-066	Luzerne County Composite	
NER-PA-146	Doylestown Composite	
NER-PA-201	Endless Mountain Composite Sqdn	
NER-PA-292	Mt Pocono Composite	
NER-PA-298	Lehigh Valley Composite Squadron	
NER-PA-303	Braden Composite Squadron	

==== Group 5 ====
The Group 5 region encompasses much of North Central Pennsylvania, including State College, Altoona, and Williamsport.

Squadron Number	Name/Location/Type	Notes
NER-PA-006	State College	
NER-PA-065	Piper Composite	
NER-PA-258	Laurel Ridge Composite Sqdn	
NER-PA-288	Brush Mountain Composite	
NER-PA-338	Nittany Composite	
NER-PA-522	Columbia County Composite	
NER-PA-602	DuBois Composite Squadron	

==== Group 6 ====
Group 6 is responsible for operations near Erie.

Squadron Number	Name/Location/Type	Notes
NER-PA-007	Greenville	
NER-PA-009	Erie Composite	
NER-PA-125	Armstrong County Composite	
NER-PA-143	Major Don Beatty Composite	
NER-PA-326	Clarion Composite	
NER-PA-337	Lawrence County Composite	
NER-PA-503	Crawford County Composite	
NER-PA-505	Warren County Composite	

== See also ==
- Pennsylvania Air National Guard
- Pennsylvania State Guard
