= Naval Air Station Joint Reserve Base Willow Grove =

Naval airbase

- Horsham Township, Pennsylvania in the United States
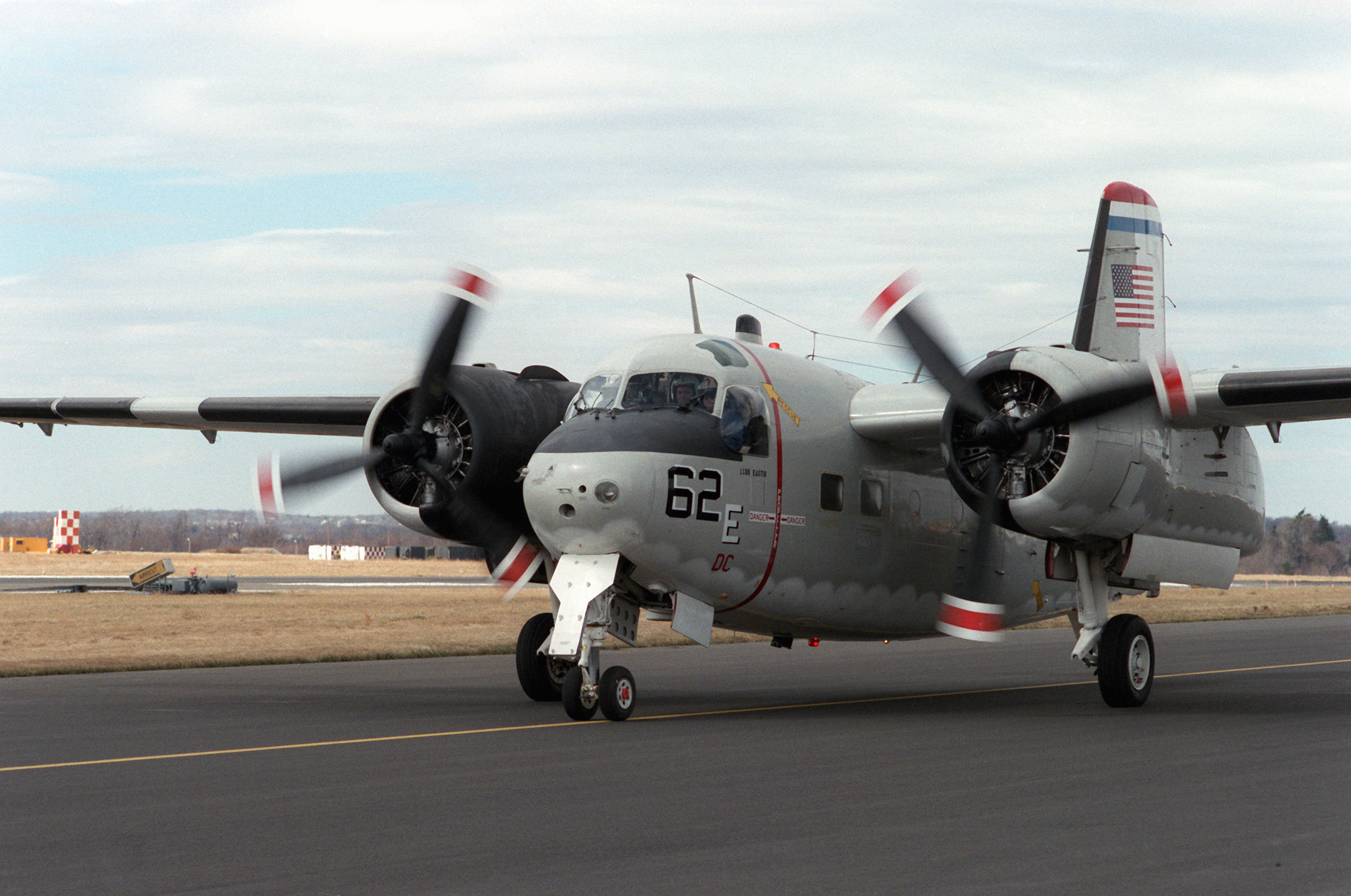
- A US Navy Grumman C-1A Trader taxiing at NAS Willow Grove in 1987

Site information
- Type: Joint base
- Owner: Department of Defense
- Operator: US Navy
- Condition: Closed
- Website: Official website (archived)

Location
- Location within Pennsylvania Location within the United States Location within North America Location within North Atlantic Location within Earth
- Coordinates: 40.1998°N 75.1482°W

Site history
- Built: 1928, as Pitcairn Field No. 2
- Built by: Pitcairn Aircraft Company
- In use: 1943–2011
- Fate: Realigned to the US Air Force as Horsham Air Guard Station

Airfield information
- Identifiers: IATA: NXX, ICAO: KNXX, FAA LID: NXX, WMO: 724086
- Elevation: 109 metres (358 ft) AMSL
Runways
| Direction | Length and surface |
|---|---|
| 15/33 | 2,439 metres (8,002 ft) Porous European Mix |

Naval Air Station Joint Reserve Base Willow Grove or NASJRB Willow Grove (IATA: NXX, ICAO: KNXX, FAA LID: NXX) was a Naval Air Station owned by the U.S. Navy and located in Horsham Township, Pennsylvania, United States, four miles (6 km) northwest of the central business district of Willow Grove, and 6 miles north of the border with Philadelphia. The installation was transferred to the Pennsylvania Air National Guard and the name changed to the Horsham Air Guard Station after the U.S. Navy departed in 2011.

== History ==
Flight activity began in 1926 when Harold Frederick Pitcairn constructed a hangar and a grass airstrip in Horsham, Pennsylvania. The airfield was named after the nearest town Willow Grove, Pennsylvania. At the time, Horsham was a rural township with little significance. From 1926 to 1942 Pitcairn used the airfield for design, construction and testing of a number of aircraft, including the Mailwing which was used by the United States Postal Service.

After the start of World War II, the United States purchased the property, under threat of eminent domain and launched a classified anti-submarine warfare program at the base. In January 1943, the base was commissioned Naval Air Station Willow Grove. Following WWII and into the Cold War, it became an operational and training base for aviation activities of the Reserve components of the United States Armed Forces such as United States Navy Reserve, Marine Corps Reserve, Air Force Reserve, Air National Guard, United States Army Reserve and Pennsylvania National Guard. In 1994, the base was renamed Naval Air Station Joint Reserve Base Willow Grove to reflect these joint operations. As part of its joint recruitment efforts, the base was an annual host to one of the largest air shows on the East Coast until 2006.

=== Base Realignment and Closure ===
On May 28, 2005, the Base Realignment and Closure commission recommended that the base be closed as part of the 2005 BRAC round, that the tenant Air Force Reserve Command airlift wing be inactivated and that Navy Reserve and Marine Corps Reserve flying units relocate to McGuire Air Force Base in New Jersey as tenant units.

On September 30, 2007, the Air Force Reserve Command disestablished the 913th Airlift Wing at the collocated Willow Grove ARS, and redistributed its C-130 Hercules aircraft to other active duty Air Force and Air Force Reserve units.

On February 29, 2008, the Commonwealth of Pennsylvania released a report detailing a plan for a joint interagency installation (JII), with a mission of national defense, homeland security and emergency preparedness. On November 13, 2009, Pennsylvania dropped the plan for the JII based on the gradual removal of the 111th Fighter Wing. Since then it is planned that a portion of the base will be used for the National Guard and other Reserve Component military personnel.

The airfield shut down on March 31, 2011; VP-64, VR-52, and a C-12 detachment were transferred to McGuire Air Force Base.

On September 15, 2011, the Pennsylvania Air National Guard took custody, and the facility was renamed Horsham Air Guard Station. The surplus land with the runways was turned over to Horsham Township for redevelopment. Horsham and other adjoining townships in Montgomery and Bucks Counties were debating the nature of this redevelopment. In September 2015, the Horsham Land Redevelopment Authority worked on an "economic development conveyance" (EDC) application to acquire the base. An EDC transfer is one way for the Navy to dispose of federal surplus property.

Parts of the base were sold off and rezoned for development in November 2025.

In 2021, the remaining operational portions of the base were formally renamed the Biddle Air National Guard Base, and, today, it is actively operated by the U.S. Air National Guard. It serves as the home station for the 111th Attack Wing which operates MQ-9 Reaper attack drones along with several other engineering, logistics, and army/air reserve units.

== Units ==
NASJRB Willow Grove was home to the following:

- 111th Fighter Wing (111 FW), Pennsylvania Air National Guard, which operated the A-10 Thunderbolt II. It lost its aircraft to other ANG Squadrons and active duty components under BRAC. As of 2013, the Wing, now renamed the 111th Attack Wing, was slated to acquire ground control stations to remotely fly the MQ-9 Reaper and became operational in 2016.
- 201st RED HORSE Squadron, Detachment 1 (201 RHS), Pennsylvania Air National Guard
- 270th Engineering Installation Squadron (270 EIS), Pennsylvania Air National Guard
- Group 3 Headquarters of Pennsylvania Wing Civil Air Patrol.
- 902nd Search and Rescue Squadron of Pennsylvania Wing Civil Air Patrol.
- The Liberty Bell Squadron of the United States Naval Sea Cadet Corps
- Naval Air Maintenance Training Detachment (NAMTD) 1010

The base was home to the following military aviation units:

- U.S. Army Reserve Units - A/4/158th Aviation Regiment flying UH-1H (GhostRiders), A & HHC/2/228th Avn flying UH-1H, OH-58, & C-12R (Winged Warriors). Outside of the USAR building on the base grounds, a retired UH-1D, used in 1974 White House helicopter incident, is on static display.
- Marine Aircraft Group 49 headquarters and HMH-772 of the Marine Air Reserve's 4th Marine Aircraft Wing, the latter operating the CH-53E Super Stallion. Both MAG-49 and HMH-772 relocated to Joint Base McGuire-Dix-Lakehurst in 2011. Also Reserve Marine Attack Squadron VMA-131 flying McDonnell Douglas A4 aircraft from 1972 until their deactivation in 1998. VMA-131
- Patrol Squadrons 64 (VP-64) and 66 (VP-66) of the United States Naval Reserve operating the P-3 Orion. VP-64 was later re-designated Fleet Logistics Support Squadron 64 (VR-64) and traded in its P-3 Orions for the C-130T Hercules
- Fleet Air Reconnaissance Squadron 11 (VQ-11 "Bandits", established at Willow Grove, moved to NAS Brunswick, Maine in the middle of 1997 were establishment ceremony was held at). VQ-11 "Bandits" was formed from VP-66 Liberty Bell's Detachment.66 (called VQ-66 "Bandits") which received the Lockheed EP-3J Electronic Orion aircraft (BuNo 152745 & BuNo 152719) from VAQ-33 Firebirds in March 1993. VQ-11 was the US Naval Air Reserve's only Reconnaissance Squadron, but performed Electronic Aggressor roles during fleet exercises.
- Fleet Logistic Support Squadrons 52 (VR-52) and 64 (VR-64) of the Naval Air Reserve, operating the C-9 Skytrain II and C-130T Hercules, respectively. Both VR-52 and VR-64 relocated to Joint Base McGuire-Dix-Lakehurst in March 2011.
- 913th Airlift Wing (913 AW) of the Air Force Reserve Command. The 913 AW was inactivated by BRAC action on 30 September 2007.
