= History of the Civil Air Patrol =

World War II era roundel used by the Civil Air Patrol

Civil Air Patrol (CAP) is the civilian auxiliary of the United States Air Force (USAF). It was created by Administrative Order 9 in December 1941, with Maj. Gen. John F. Curry as the first CAP national commander. The organization was originally formed to provide civilian air support to aid the war effort of World War II through border and coastal patrols, military training assistance, courier services and other activities. These efforts were recognized and, after the close of the war, Civil Air Patrol was transferred from the United States Army to the newly formed U.S. Air Force. Through the enactment of Public Law 79-476 by the U.S. Congress and signed by President Harry S. Truman, Civil Air Patrol was incorporated as a nonprofit organization of "volunteers and declared to be of a benevolent nature, never again to be involved in direct combat activities."

Since that time, Civil Air Patrol has carried out three congressionally mandated objectives: emergency services (including search and rescue operations), aerospace education for youth and the general public, and cadet programs for teenage youth. In addition, it has been tasked with assisting the United States Department of Homeland Security, and also performs non-auxiliary missions for various governmental and private agencies, such as local law enforcement and the American Red Cross.

== Origin ==
The general idea of Civil Air Patrol (CAP) originated with a collective brainstorm of pilots and aviators before the start of World War II. In the later half of the 1930s, the Axis powers became a threat to the United States, its allies and its interests. As the Axis steadily took control of the greater part of Europe and South-East Asia, aviation-minded Americans noticed a trend: in all of the conquered countries and territories, civil aviation was more or less halted in order to reduce the risk of sabotage. Countries that were directly involved in the conflict strictly regulated general aviation, allowing military flights only. American aviators did not wish to see the same fate befall themselves, but realized that if nothing was done to convince the federal government that civil aviation could be of direct and measurable benefit to the imminent war effort, the government would likely severely limit general aviation.

The concrete plan for a general aviation organization designed to aid the U.S. military at home was envisaged in 1938 by Gill Robb Wilson. Wilson, then aviation editor of The New York Herald Tribune, was on assignment in Germany prior to the outbreak of World War II. He took note of the actions and intentions of the Nazi government and its tactic of grounding all general aviation. Upon returning, he reported his findings to the New Jersey governor, advising that an organization be created that would use the civil air fleet of New Jersey as an augmentative force for the war effort that seemed impending. The plan was approved, and with the backing of Chief of the Army Air Corps General Henry H. "Hap" Arnold and the Civil Aeronautics Authority, the New Jersey Civil Air Defense Services (NJCADS) was formed. The plan called for the use of single-engine aircraft for liaison work, as well as coastal and infrastructure patrol. General security activities regarding aviation were also made the responsibility of the NJCADS.

Other similar groups were organized, such as the AOPA Civil Air Guard and the Florida Defense Force.

During this time, the Army Air Corps and the Civil Aeronautics Administration initiated two separate subprograms. The first was the introduction of a civilian pilot refresher course and the Civilian Pilot Training Program. The motive behind this step was to increase the pool of available airmen who could be placed into military service if such a time came. The second step was concentrated more on the civil air strength of the nation in general and called for the organization of civilian aviators and personnel in such a way that the collective manpower and know-how would assist in the seemingly inevitable all-out war effort. This second step was arguably the Federal government's blessing towards the creation of Civil Air Patrol. It was followed by a varied and intense debate over organizational logistics, bureaucracy and other administrative and practical details.

Thomas H. Beck, who was at the time the Chairman of the Board of the Crowell-Collier Publishing Company, compiled an outline and plan to present to President Franklin D. Roosevelt that would lead up to the organization of the nation's civilian air power. Beck received peer guidance and support from Guy Gannett, the owner of a Maine newspaper chain. On 20 May 1941, the Office of Civilian Defense was created, with former New York City mayor and World War I pilot Fiorello H. La Guardia as the director. Wilson, Beck, and Gannett presented their plan for a national civil air patrol to La Guardia, and he approved the idea. He then appointed Wilson, Beck, and Gannett to form the so-called "blueprint committee" and charged them with organizing the national aviation resources on a national scale.

By October 1941 the plan was completed. The remaining tasks were chiefly administrative, such as the appointment of wing commanders, and Wilson left his New York office and traveled to Washington, D.C. to speak with Army officials as Civil Air Patrol's first executive officer. General Henry "Hap" Arnold organized a board of top military officers to review Wilson's final plan. The board, which included General George E. Stratemeyer (presiding officer of the board), Colonel Harry H. Blee, Major Lucas P. Ordway, Jr., and Major A.B. McMullen, reviewed the plan set forward by Wilson and his colleagues and evaluated the role of the War Department as an agency of the Office of Civilian Defense. The plan was approved and the recommendation was made that United States Army Air Forces officers assist with key positions such as flight training and logistics.

== World War II ==
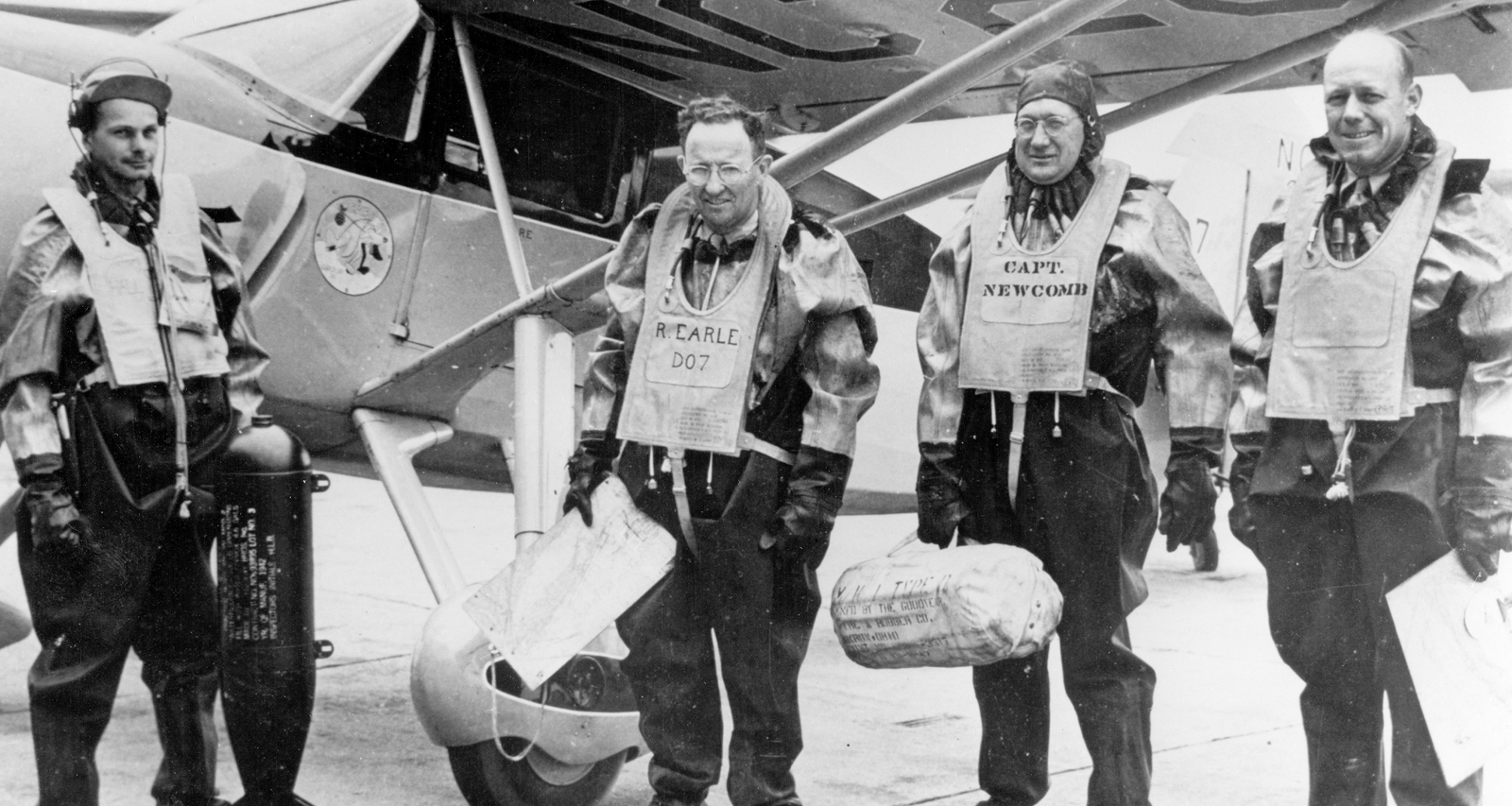
The Subchasers of CAP Coastal Base 3, Lantana, Florida

With the approval of the Army Air Forces, Director La Guardia formalized the creation of Civil Air Patrol with Administrative Order 9, signed on 1 December 1941 and published 8 December 1941. This order outlined Civil Air Patrol's organization and named its first national commander as Major General John F. Curry. Wilson was officially made the executive officer of the new organization. Additionally, Colonel Harry H. Blee was appointed the new operations director.

The very fear that sparked the Civil Air Patrol "movement" – that general aviation would be halted – became a reality when the Imperial Japanese Navy attacked Pearl Harbor on 7 December 1941. On 8 December 1941, all civil aircraft, with the exception of airliners, were grounded. This ban was lifted two days later (with the exception of the entire United States West Coast) and things went more or less back to normal.

Earle L. Johnson took notice of the lack of security at general aviation airports despite the attack on Pearl Harbor. Seeing the potential for light aircraft to be used by saboteurs, Johnson took it upon himself to prove how vulnerable the nation was. Johnson took off in his own aircraft from his farm airstrip near Cleveland, Ohio, taking three small sandbags with him. Flying at 500 feet (150 m), Johnson dropped a sandbag on each of three war plants and then returned to his airstrip. The next morning he notified the factory owners that he had "bombed" their facilities. The Civil Aeronautics Administration (CAA) apparently got Johnson's message and grounded all civil aviation until better security measures could be taken. Not surprisingly, Civil Air Patrol's initial membership increased along with the new security.

With America's entrance into World War II, German U-boats began to operate along the East Coast. Their operations were very effective, sinking a total of 204 vessels by September 1942. Civil Air Patrol's top leaders requested that the War Department give them the authority to directly combat the U-boat threat. The request was initially opposed, for the CAP was still a young and inexperienced organization. However, with the alarming numbers of ships being sunk by the U-boats, the War Department finally agreed to give CAP a chance.

On 5 March 1942, under the leadership of the newly promoted National Commander Johnson (the same Johnson that had "bombed" the factories with sandbags), Civil Air Patrol was given authority to operate a coastal patrol at two locations along the East Coast: Atlantic City, New Jersey at Bader Field, and Rehoboth Beach, Delaware. They were given a time frame of 90 days to prove their worth. The CAP's performance was outstanding, and before the 90-day period was over, the coastal patrol operations were authorized to expand in both duration and territory. By the end of the war, CAP pilots had flown over 500,000 mission hours. However, more than 90 aircraft were lost, and between 59 and 64 CAP pilots were killed, including 26 who were lost while on coastal patrol.

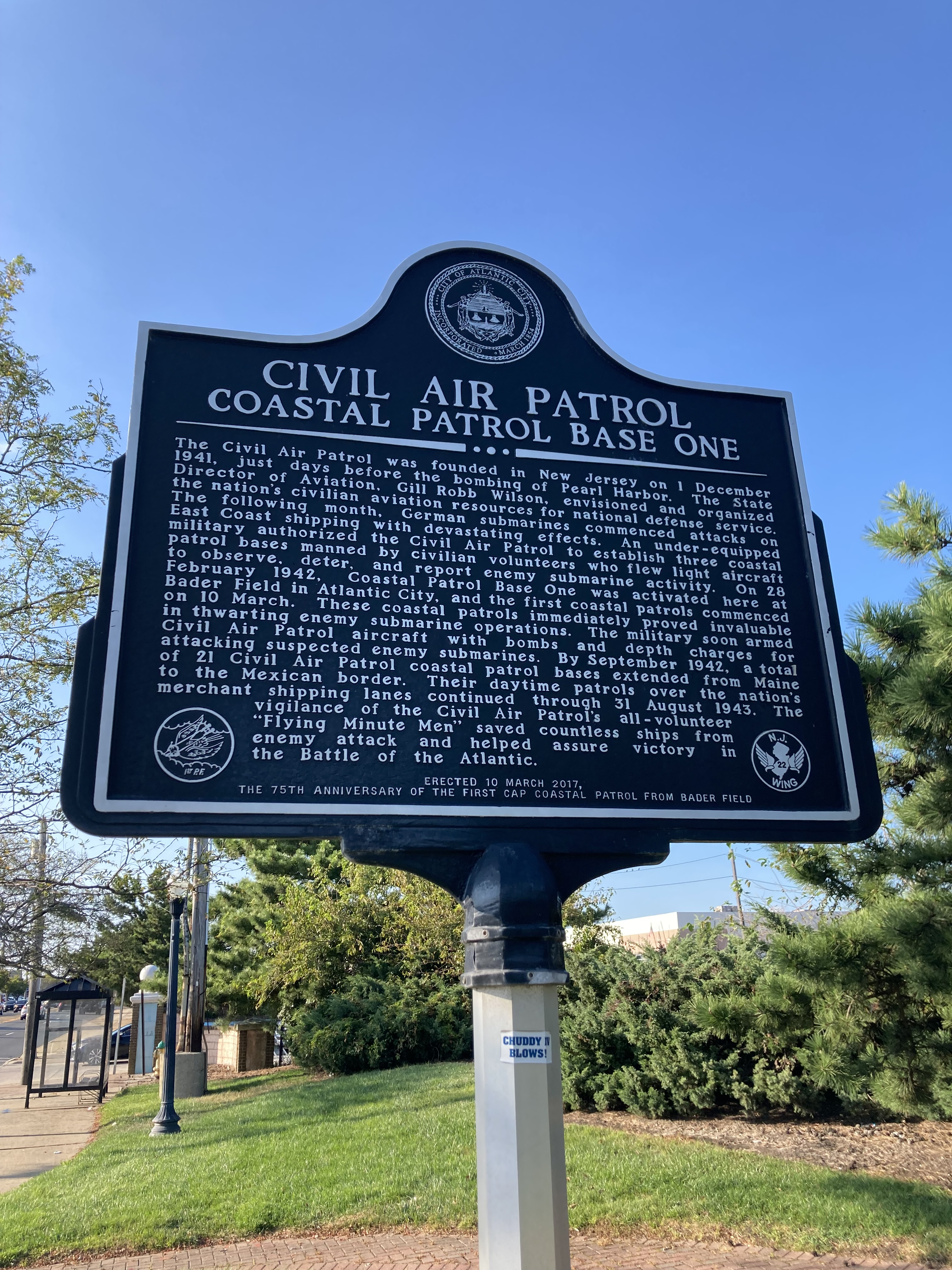
Marker to the Civil Air Patrol, Bader Field, Atlantic City

=== Coastal Patrol ===
Originally under 1 Air Support Command, CAP was placed under 1 Bomber Command 19 August 1942. At its height, Civil Air Patrol Coastal Patrol operated 21 coastal bases in 13 states along the Eastern Seaboard and the Gulf of Mexico. The Coastal Patrol was originally meant to be unarmed and strictly reconnaissance. The air crews of the patrol aircraft were to keep in touch with their bases and notify the Army Air Forces and Navy in the area when a U-boat was sighted, and to remain in the area until relieved. This policy was reviewed, however, when Civil Air Patrol encountered a turkey shoot opportunity. In May 1942, a CAP crew consisting of pilot Thomas Manning and observer Marshall "Doc" Rinker were flying a coastal patrol mission off Cape Canaveral when they spotted a German U-boat. The U-boat crew also spotted the aircraft, but not knowing that it was unarmed, attempted to flee. The U-boat became stuck on a sandbar, and consequently became an easy target.

Rinker and Manning radioed to mission base the opportunity and circled the U-boat for more than half an hour. Unfortunately, by the time that Army Air Force bombers came to destroy the U-boat, the vessel had dislodged itself and had escaped to deep waters. As a result of this incident, CAP aircraft were authorized to be fitted with bombs and depth charges. Some of CAP's larger aircraft had the capability of carrying a single 300-pound (140 kg) depth charge, however, most light aircraft could only carry a 100-pound (50 kg) bomb. In some cases, the bomb's flight fins had to be partially removed so they would be able to fit underneath the wing of a light aircraft.

One squadron's insignia of the time was a cartoon drawing of a small plane sweating and straining to carry a large bomb. This insignia became popular throughout CAP.

The CAP's alleged first kill was claimed by one of the larger aircraft on 11 July 1942. The Grumman G-44 Widgeon, armed with two depth charges and crewed by Captain Johnny Haggins and Major Wynant Farr, was scrambled when another CAP patrol radioed that they had encountered an enemy submarine but were returning to base due to low fuel. After scanning the area, Farr spotted the U-boat cruising beneath the surface of the waves. Unable to accurately determine the depth of the vessel, Haggins and Ferr radioed the situation back to base and followed the enemy in hopes that it would rise to periscope depth. For three hours, the crew shadowed the submarine. Just as Haggins was about to return to base, the U-boat rose to periscope depth, and Haggins swung the aircraft around, aligned with the submarine and dove to 100 feet (30 m). Farr released one of the two depth charges, blowing the submarine's front out of the water. As it left an oil slick, Farr made a second pass and released the other charge. Debris appeared on the ocean's surface, seemingly confirming the U-boat's demise and CAP's first kill. CAP's Coastal Patrol operated for about 18 months (from 5 March 1942 to 31 August 1943) before being officially retired. During this time, the Coastal Patrol reported sighting 173 U-boats and dropping 82 bombs or depth charges. Overall, the Coastal Patrol flew 86,685 missions, logging over 244,600 hours. Coastal Patrol aircraft reported 91 ships in distress and played a key role in rescuing 363 survivors of U-boat attacks. 17 floating mines were reported and 5,684 convoy missions were flown for the Navy.

=== Border Patrol ===
Between July 1942 and April 1944, the Civil Air Patrol Southern Liaison Patrol was given the task of patrolling the border between Brownsville, Texas, and Douglas, Arizona. The Southern Liaison Patrol logged approximately 30,000 flight hours and patrolled roughly 1,000 miles (1,600 km) of the land separating the United States and Mexico. Southern Liaison Patrol tasks included looking for indications of spy or saboteur activity and were similar to counterdrug missions executed by Civil Air Patrol today. Aircraft piloted by the Southern Liaison Patrol often flew low enough to read the license plates on suspicious automobiles traveling in the patrol region.

During its time of operation the Southern Liaison Patrol, more commonly known as the "CAP Border Patrol", reported almost 7,000 out-of-the-ordinary activities and 176 suspicious aircraft' descriptions and direction. During the entire operating period, only two members lost their lives. Considering the fact that the Border Patrol was one of the most dangerous missions CAP flew (along with Coastal Patrol), this is an exceptionally low number.

=== Target towing ===
In March 1942, CAP aircraft began towing targets for air-to-air (fighters) and ground-to-air (anti-aircraft batteries) gunnery practice. Targets would be trailed behind the aircraft (similar to the way an aircraft trails a banner) to simulate strafing attacks. CAP aircraft would also climb to various altitudes and would trail two targets for heavy AA guns to use for practice. Although uncommon, an antiaircraft round would occasionally hit the aircraft. Surprisingly, no deaths resulted from errant shots.

Similarly, CAP aircraft also flew night missions to provide tracking practice for the crews of searchlights and radar units. These missions were dangerous in the sense that the pilot ran the risk of accidentally looking into the glare of a searchlight while performing evasive maneuvers, which would blind and disorient him. Such was the case of Captain Raoul Souliere, who lost his life after he went into a steep dive; witnesses surmised that he looked into the glare of a spotlight that had locked on to him, became disoriented, and did not realize he was in a dive.

Despite the dangerous nature of these missions, fatalities and accidents were rare. CAP flew target missions for three years with 7 member fatalities, 5 serious injuries and 23 aircraft lost. A total of 20,593 towing and tracking missions were flown.

=== Search and Rescue operations (SAR) ===
During the period between 1 January 1942 and 1 January 1946, Civil Air Patrol pilots flew over 24,000 hours of federal- and military-assigned search and rescue missions in addition to thousands of hours of non-assigned SAR missions. These missions were a huge success, and in one particular week during February 1945, CAP SAR air crews found seven missing Army and Navy aircraft.

Civil Air Patrol had several decisive advantages over the Army Air Forces in terms of SAR ability. First, because CAP was using civilian aircraft, they could fly lower and slower than the aircraft of the AAF. Second, unlike AAF pilots, CAP pilots tended to be local citizens and therefore knew the terrain much better. Third, CAP utilized ground teams which would travel to the suspected crash site (often by foot, although some wings had other ways of reaching a wreckage).

=== Courier service and cargo transportation ===
In the spring of 1942, the Pennsylvania Wing conducted a 30-day experiment with the intention of convincing the AAF that they were capable of flying cargo missions for the nation. The Pennsylvania Wing transported Army cargo as far as Georgia, and top Army officials were impressed. The War Department gave CAP permission to conduct courier and cargo service for the military.

Although not generally remembered as one of CAP's "glamorous" jobs, cargo and courier transportation was an important job for the organization. From 1942 to 1944, Civil Air Patrol moved around 1,750 short tons (1,590 t) of mail and cargo and hundreds of military passengers.

=== Pilot training and the cadet program ===
In October 1942, CAP planned a program to recruit and train youth with an emphasis on flight training. The CAP cadets assisted with operational tasks and began training towards becoming licensed pilots. Cadets were not exempt from being conscripted; however, the military atmosphere and general setting around them would provide an advantage to cadets who were subsequently called into service. To become a cadet, one had to be between the ages of 15 and 17, and be sponsored by a CAP member of the same gender. The cadet program called for physical fitness, completion of the first two years of high school and satisfactory grades. It was open only to native-born American citizens of parents who had been citizens of the United States for at least ten years. These restrictions were intentionally imposed to hold down membership levels until a solid foundation could be established.

Perhaps the most astonishing fact of the cadet program's 20,000-plus initial membership was the lack of cost; it cost the Office of Civilian Defense less than US$200 to get the program underway, and this was to cover administrative costs.

=== Other wartime activities ===
CAP pilots were called on to provide a variety of missions that were not necessarily combat-related but still of direct benefit to the country. Some of the most notable of these missions were: flying blood bank mercy missions for the American Red Cross and other similar agencies; forest fire patrol and arson reporting; mock raids to test blackout practices and air raid warning systems; supporting war bond drives; and assisting in salvage collection drives. In the Northwestern states, Civil Air Patrol members, armed with shotguns, flew patrols hoping to spot Japanese balloon bombs.

Perhaps the most curious job for CAP was "wolf patrol". In the southwestern United States, the native wolf population had been disrupting ranching operations. One rancher alone lost over 1,000 head of cattle due to wolf predation. This represented a huge monetary loss to ranchers and an added restriction to the already low supply of beef due to wartime rationing. By the winter of 1944, Texas ranchers lobbied the Texan governor to enlist the aid of Civil Air Patrol to control the wolf populations. CAP pilots, armed with firearms, flew over wolf territory and thinned the population to lower levels.

CAP even had its own airbase during the war. A Civil Aeronautics Administration (CAA) auxiliary landing field, northwest of Baker, California, was given to Civil Air Patrol. Used primarily for training, Silver Lake boasted a hangar, barracks, mess hall and even a swimming pool and bath house.

=== Results of wartime activities ===
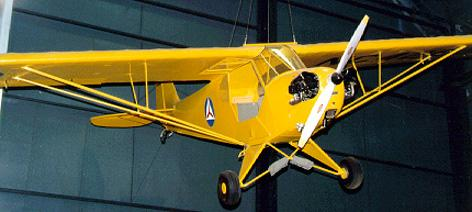
J-3 aircraft with CAP markings on display at the National Museum of the United States Air Force

Civil Air Patrol's success with the cadet program, along with its impressive wartime record, led the War Department to create a permanent place for it in the department. On 29 April 1943, by order of President Franklin D. Roosevelt, the command of Civil Air Patrol was transferred from the Office of Civilian Defense to the War Department and given status as the auxiliary to the Army Air Forces. On 4 March 1943, the War Department issued Memorandum W95-12-43, which assigned the AAF the responsibility for supervising and directing operations of the CAP.

One of the direct outcomes of this transfer was the loaning of 288 Piper L-4 "Grasshopper" aircraft from the AAF to the CAP. These aircraft were used in the cadet recruiting program. By 1945 there was an oversupply of cadets and CAP took over the responsibility of administering cadet mental screening tests.

== Postwar ==
With the close of World War II, CAP suddenly found itself looking for a purpose. It had proved its worthiness and usefulness in wartime, but the ensuing peace had reduced CAP's scope of activities since the USAAF assumed a great many of the tasks that the CAP had performed. The very existence of CAP was threatened when the AAF announced that it would withdraw financial support on 1 April 1946, due to massive budget cuts. General "Hap" Arnold called a conference of CAP wing commanders, which convened in January 1946 and discussed the usefulness and feasibility of a postwar Civil Air Patrol. The conference concluded with the plan to incorporate Civil Air Patrol.

On 1 March 1946, the 48 wing commanders held the first CAP/Congressional dinner honoring President Harry S. Truman, the 79th United States Congress, and over 50 AAF generals. The purpose of the dinner was to permit CAP to thank the President and others for the opportunity to serve the country during World War II.

On 1 July 1946, Public Law 79-476 was enacted. The law incorporated Civil Air Patrol and stated that the purpose of the organization was to be "solely of a benevolent character". In other words, Civil Air Patrol was to never participate in combat operations again. With the creation of the United States Air Force on 26 July 1947, the command of Civil Air Patrol was transferred from the United States Army to the newly created Air Force. In October 1947, a CAP board convened to meet with USAF officials and plan the groundwork of Civil Air Patrol as the USAF auxiliary. After several meetings the USAF was satisfied and a bill was introduced to the United States House of Representatives. On 26 May 1948, Public Law 80-557 was enacted and CAP became the official auxiliary to the United States Air Force.

Civil Air Patrol had been subordinate to Air Education and Training Command to fulfill the Aerospace Education mission. On June 24, 2016, Civil Air Patrol was transferred from the Air Education and Training Command (AETC) to the Air Combat Command (ACC) as part of the US Air Force Total Command, in recognition of CAP's Emergency Services role, which includes approximately 8,000 missions flying 20,000 hours a year. CAP members often volunteer at airshows, and the CAP provides a program to educate young children called Aerospace Connections in Education. Civil Air Patrol often assists in Air Force search and rescue missions under the orders of the Air Force Rescue Coordination Center. Civil Air Patrol's search and rescue missions save an average of 100 lives per year. Civil Air Patrol cadets can enlist in the Air Force as E-3 (Airman First Class) if they achieve the grade of Cadet 2nd Lieutenant.

== Notes ==
=== References ===
- Introduction to Civil Air Patrol (PDF). Maxwell AFB: National Headquarters, Civil Air Patrol. April 2013. CAP Pamphlet 50-5. Archived from the original (PDF) on 2020-02-15.
