= Public Law 79-476 =

Public Law 79-476 (Pub. L. 79–476, 60 Stat. 346, enacted July 1, 1946) is a statute passed by the 79th U.S. Congress. It provided that the Civil Air Patrol, which later became a civilian auxiliary of the United States Air Force, was to be "solely of a benevolent character" and not for its members' pecuniary profit.

The statute established the Civil Air Patrol as a federally chartered corporation. In 1948, the Civil Air Patrol Act established it as an auxiliary of the Air Force.
