= Kamala Harris as Attorney General of California =

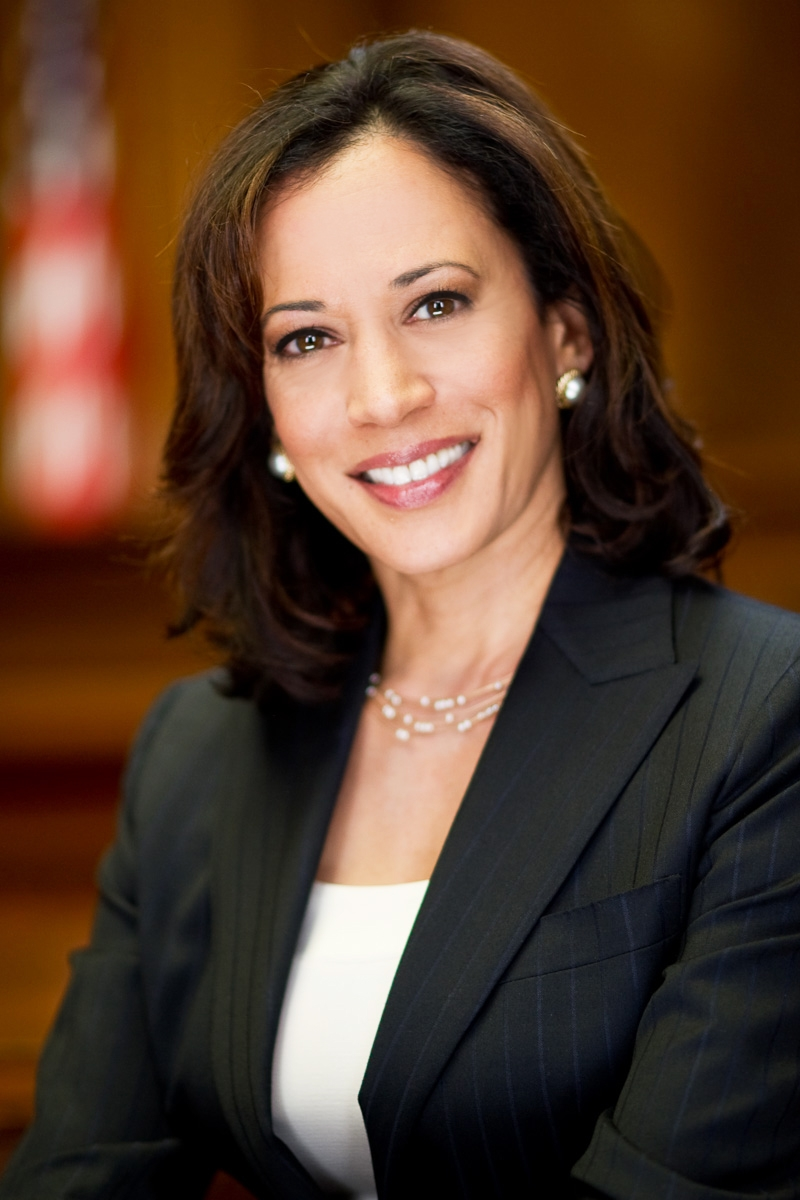
- Official portrait
- Kamala Harris as Attorney General of California; January 3, 2011 – January 3, 2017
- Governor: Jerry Brown
- Party: Democratic
- Election: 2010; 2014
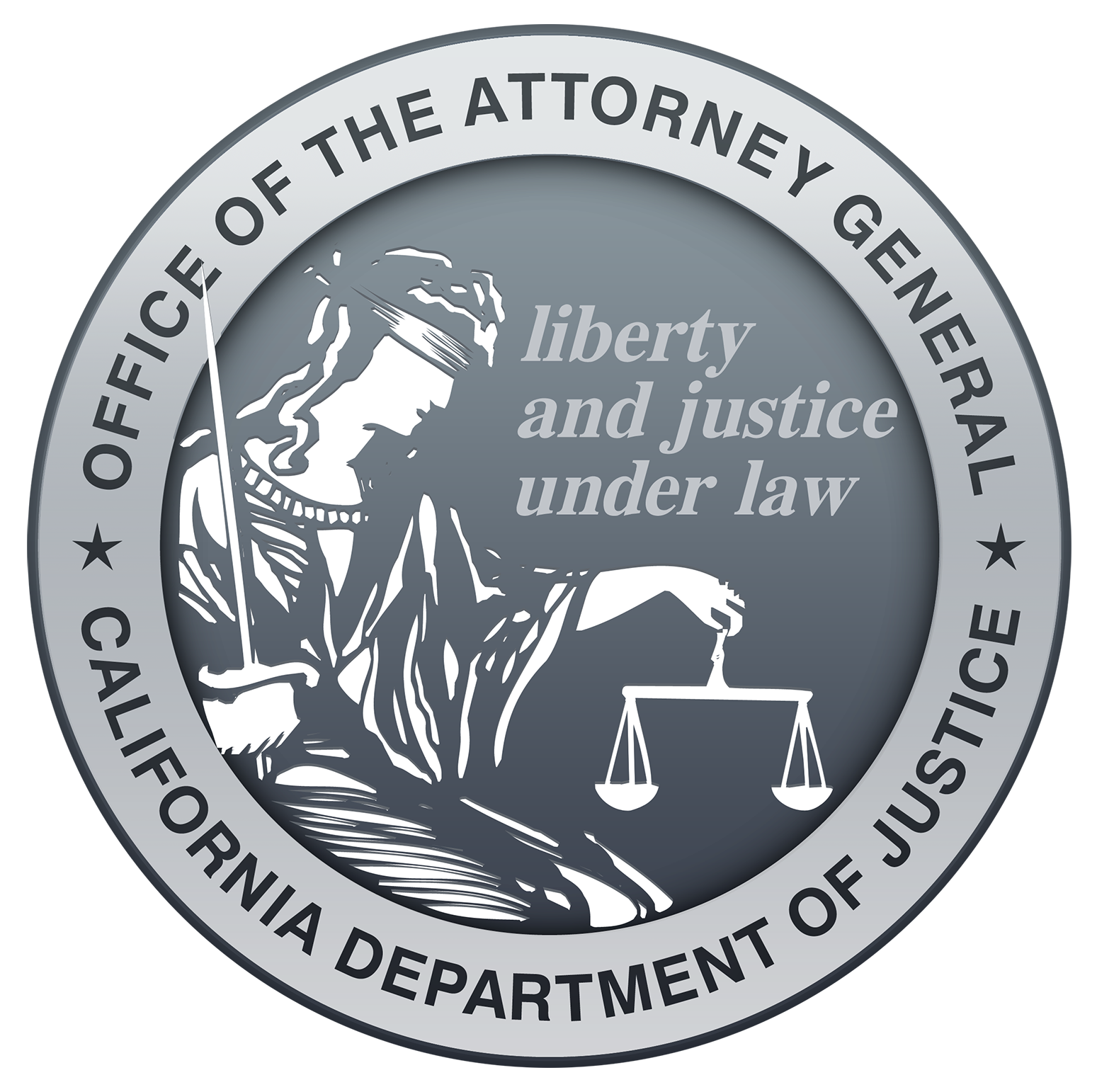

Kamala Harris was elected the attorney general of California in 2010, becoming the first woman, Black American, and South Asian American to hold the office in the state's history. She took office on January 3, 2011, and would be re-elected in 2014 to serve until she resigned on January 3, 2017, to take her seat in the United States Senate.

In 2010, Harris announced her candidacy for attorney general and was endorsed by prominent California Democrats, including Senators Dianne Feinstein and Barbara Boxer, House Speaker Nancy Pelosi, and others. She won the Democratic primary and narrowly defeated Republican Steve Cooley in the general election. Her tenure was marked by significant efforts in consumer protection, criminal justice reform, and privacy rights.

In 2014, Harris successfully ran for re-election, defeating Republican Ronald Gold with 58% of the vote. During her second term, she expanded her focus on consumer protection, securing major settlements against corporations like Quest Diagnostics, JPMorgan Chase, and Corinthian Colleges, recovering billions for California consumers. She spearheaded the creation of the Homeowner Bill of Rights to combat aggressive foreclosure practices, during the housing crisis, recording multiple nine-figure settlements against mortgage servicers. Harris also worked on privacy rights. She collaborated with major tech companies like Apple, Google, and Facebook to ensure mobile apps disclosed their data-sharing practices. She created the Privacy Enforcement and Protection Unit, focusing on cyber privacy and data breaches. California secured settlements with companies like Comcast and Houzz for privacy violations.

Harris was instrumental in advancing criminal justice reform. She launched the Division of Recidivism Reduction and Re-Entry and implemented the Back on Track LA program, which provided educational and job training opportunities for non-violent offenders. Despite her focus on reform, Harris faced criticism for defending the state's position in cases involving wrongful convictions and for her office's stance on prison labor. She continued to advocate for progressive reforms, including banning the gay panic defense in California courts and opposing Proposition 8, the state's same-sex marriage ban.

== Elections ==
=== 2010 ===
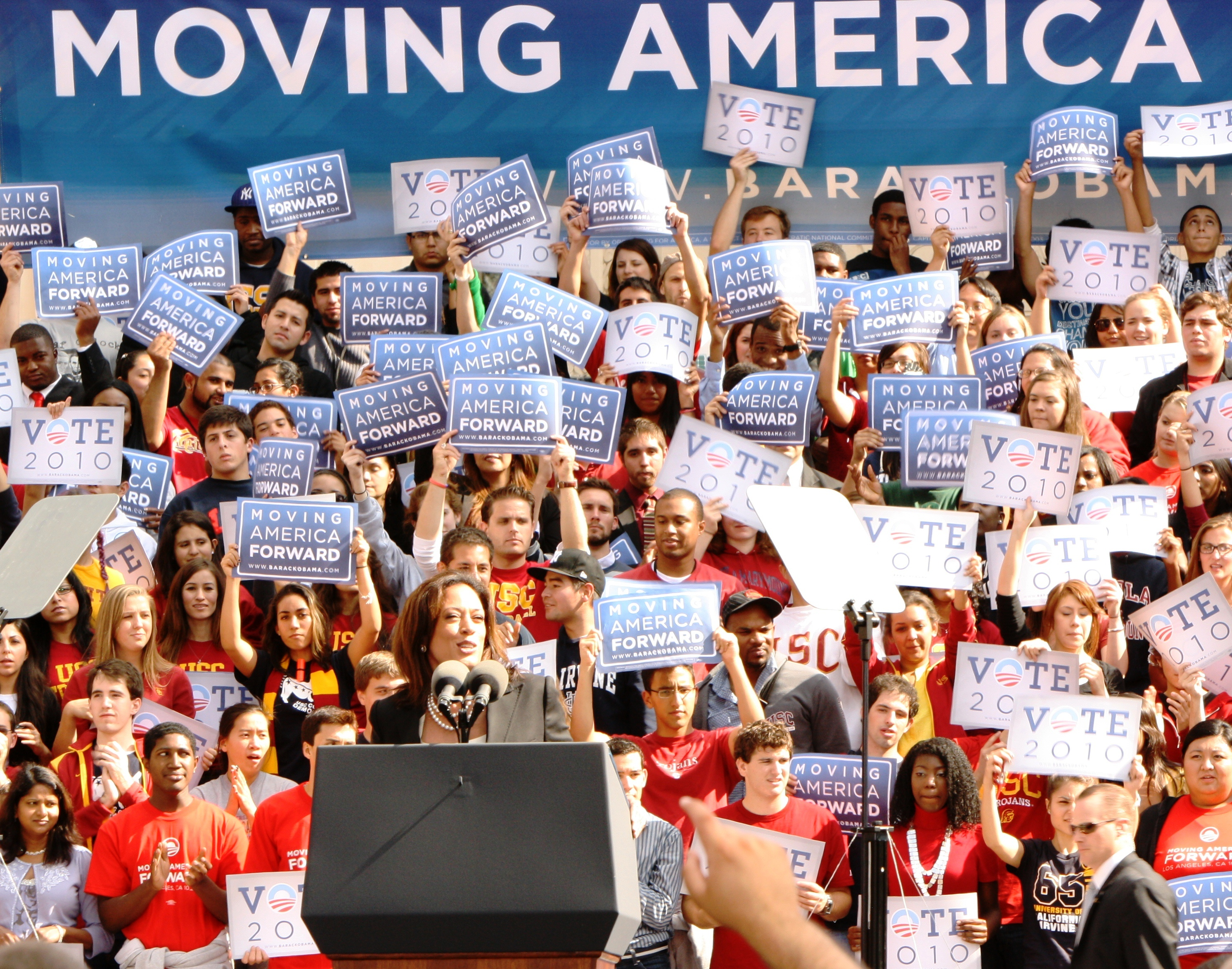
Harris speaking at a Democratic rally at the University of Southern California in October 2010

Nearly two years before the 2010 election, Harris announced she planned to run. She also stated she would run only if then-Attorney General Jerry Brown did not seek re-election for that position. Brown instead chose to run for governor and Harris consolidated support from prominent California Democrats. Both of California's senators, Dianne Feinstein and Barbara Boxer, House Speaker Nancy Pelosi, United Farm Workers cofounder Dolores Huerta, and mayor of Los Angeles Antonio Villaraigosa all endorsed her during the Democratic primary. In the June 8, 2010, primary, she was nominated with 33.6 percent of the vote, defeating Alberto Torrico and Chris Kelly.

In the general election, she faced Republican Los Angeles County district attorney Steve Cooley, who led most of the race. Cooley ran as a nonpartisan, distancing himself from Republican gubernatorial candidate Meg Whitman's campaign. The election was held November 2 but after a protracted period of counting mail-in and provisional ballots, Cooley conceded on November 25. Harris was sworn in on January 3, 2011; she was the first woman, the first Indian American, and the first South Asian American to hold the office of Attorney General in the state's history.

=== 2014 ===
In September 2011, Donald Trump donated $5,000 to Harris's 2014 re-election campaign.

Harris announced her intention to run for re-election in February 2014 and filed paperwork to run on February 12. The Sacramento Bee, Los Angeles Daily News, and Los Angeles Times endorsed her for re-election.

On November 4, 2014, Harris was re-elected against Republican Ronald Gold, winning 57.5 percent of the vote to 42.5 percent.

== Consumer protection ==
=== Fraud, waste, and abuse ===
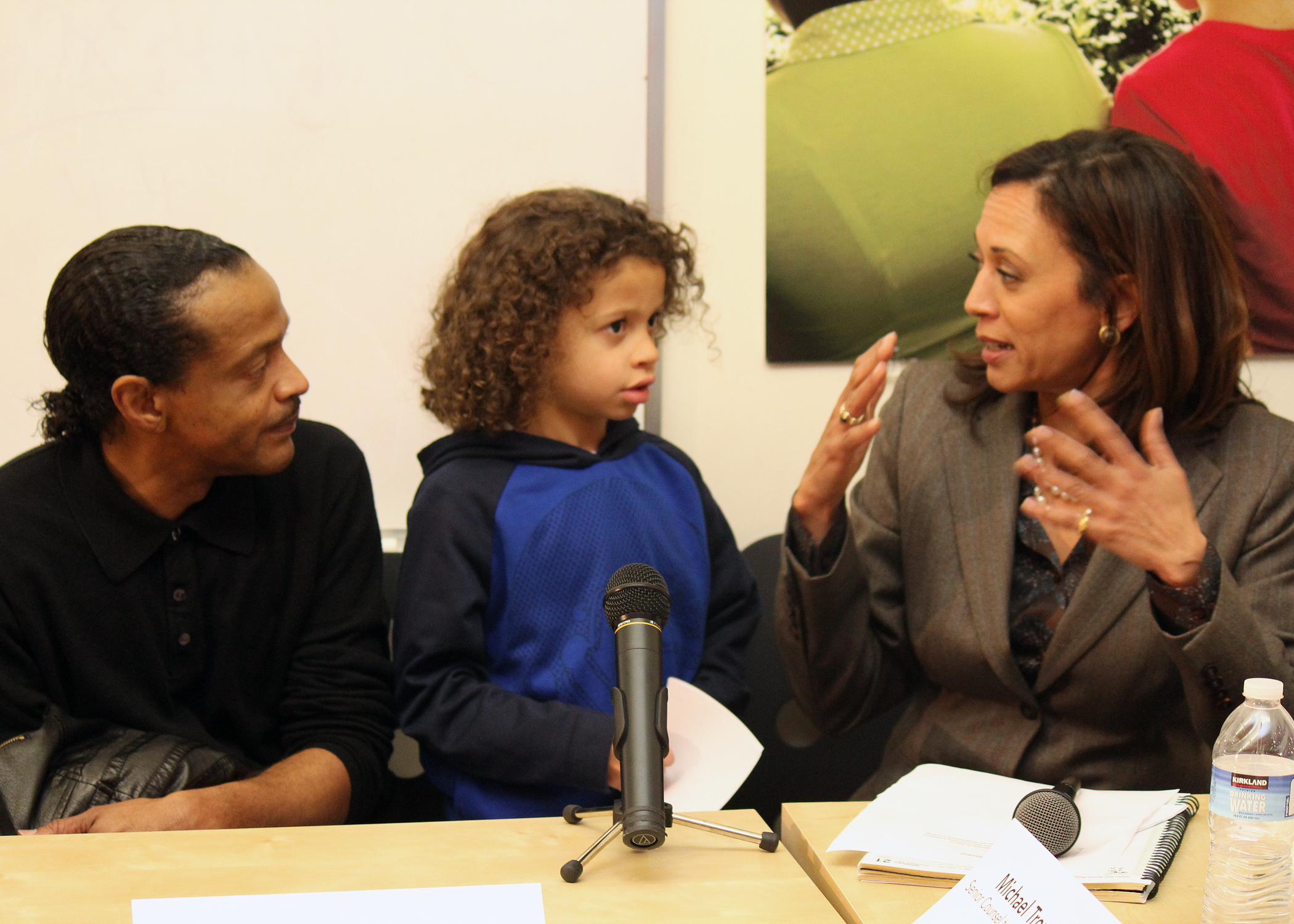
Harris meeting foreclosure victims in 2011

In 2011, Harris announced the creation of the Mortgage Fraud Strike Force in the wake of the 2010 United States foreclosure crisis. That same year, Harris obtained two of the largest recoveries in the history of California's False Claims Act – $241 million from Quest Diagnostics and then $323 million from the SCAN healthcare network – over excess state Medi-Cal and federal Medicare payments.

In 2012, Harris leveraged California's economic clout to obtain better terms in the National Mortgage Settlement against the nation's five largest mortgage servicers – JPMorgan Chase, Bank of America, Wells Fargo, Citigroup and Ally Bank. The mortgage firms were accused of illegally foreclosing on homeowners. After dismissing an initial offer of $2–4 billion in relief for Californians, Harris withdrew from negotiations. The offer eventually was increased to $18.4 billion in debt relief and $2 billion in other financial assistance for California homeowners.

Harris worked with Assembly speaker John Pérez and Senate president pro tem Darrell Steinberg in 2013 to introduce the Homeowner Bill of Rights, considered one of the strongest protections nationwide against aggressive foreclosure tactics. The Homeowner Bill of Rights banned the practices of "dual-tracking" (processing a modification and foreclosure at the same time) and robo-signing and provided homeowners with a single point of contact at their lending institution. Harris achieved multiple nine-figure settlements for California homeowners under the bill mostly for robo-signing and dual-track abuses, as well as prosecuting instances in which loan processors failed to promptly credit mortgage payments, miscalculated interest rates, and charged borrowers improper fees. Harris secured hundreds of millions in relief, including $268 million from Ocwen Financial Corporation, $470 million from HSBC, and $550 million from SunTrust Banks.

From 2013 to 2015, Harris pursued financial recoveries for California's public employee and teacher's pensions, CalPERS and CalSTRS against various financial giants for misrepresentation in the sale of mortgage-backed securities. She secured multiple nine-figure recoveries for the state pensions, recovering about $193 million from Citigroup, $210 million from S&P, $300 million from JPMorgan Chase, and over half a billion from Bank of America.

In 2013, Harris declined to authorize a civil complaint drafted by state investigators who accused OneWest Bank, owned by an investment group headed by future U.S. treasury secretary Steven Mnuchin (then a private citizen), of "widespread violation" of California foreclosure laws. During the 2016 elections, Harris was the only Democratic Senate candidate to receive a donation from Mnuchin. Harris was criticized for accepting the donation because Mnuchin purportedly profited from the subprime mortgage crisis through OneWest Bank; she later voted against his confirmation as treasury secretary in February 2017. In 2019, Harris's campaign stated that the decision not to pursue prosecution hinged on the state's inability to subpoena OneWest. Her spokesman said, "There was no question OneWest conducted predatory lending, and Senator Harris believes they should be punished. Unfortunately, the law was squarely on their side and they were shielded from state subpoenas because they're a federal bank."

In 2014, Harris settled charges she had brought against rent-to-own retailer Aaron's on allegations of incorrect late charges, overcharging customers who paid off their contracts before the due date, and privacy violations. In the settlement, the retailer refunded $28.4 million to California customers and paid $3.4 million in civil penalties.

In 2015, Harris obtained a $1.2 billion judgment against for-profit post-secondary education company Corinthian Colleges for false advertising and deceptive marketing targeting vulnerable, low-income students and misrepresenting job placement rates to students, investors, and accreditation agencies. The Court ordered Corinthian to pay $820 million in restitution and another $350 million in civil penalties. That same year, Harris also secured a $60 million settlement with JPMorgan Chase to resolve allegations of illegal debt collection with respect to credit card customers, with the bank also agreeing to change practices that violated California consumer protection laws by collecting incorrect amounts, selling bad credit card debt, and running a debt-collection mill that "robo-signed" court documents without first reviewing the files as it rushed to obtain judgments and wage garnishments. As part of the settlement, the bank was required to stop attempting to collect on more than 528,000 customer accounts.

In 2015, Harris opened an investigation of the Office of Ratepayer Advocates, San Diego Gas and Electric, and Southern California Edison regarding the closure of San Onofre Nuclear Generating Station. California state investigators searched the home of California utility regulator Michael Peevey and found handwritten notes that allegedly showed he had met with an Edison executive in Poland, where the two had negotiated the terms of the San Onofre settlement, leaving San Diego taxpayers with a $3.3 billion bill to pay for the closure of the plant. The investigation was closed amidst Harris's 2016 run for the U.S. Senate position.

=== Privacy rights ===
In February 2012, Harris announced an agreement with Apple, Amazon, Google, Hewlett-Packard, Microsoft, and Research in Motion to mandate that apps sold in their stores display prominent privacy policies informing users of what private information they were sharing, and with whom. Facebook later joined the agreement. That summer, Harris announced the creation of a Privacy Enforcement and Protection Unit to enforce laws related to cyber privacy, identity theft, and data breaches. Later the same year, Harris notified a hundred mobile-app developers of their non-compliance with state privacy laws and asked them to create privacy policies or face a $2,500 fine each time a non-compliant app is downloaded by a resident of California.

In 2015, Harris secured two settlements with Comcast, one totaling $33 million over allegations that it posted online the names, phone numbers and addresses of tens of thousands of customers who had paid for unlisted voice over internet protocol (VOIP) phone service and another $26 million settlement to resolve allegations that it discarded paper records without first omitting or redacting private customer information. Harris also settled with Houzz over allegations that the company recorded phone calls without notifying customers or employees. Houzz was forced to pay $175,000, destroy the recorded calls, and hire a chief privacy officer, the first time such a provision had been included in a settlement with the California Department of Justice.

== Criminal justice reform ==
=== Launch of Division of Recidivism Reduction and Re-Entry ===
In November 2013, Harris launched the California Department of Justice's Division of Recidivism Reduction and Re-Entry in partnership with district attorney offices in San Diego, Los Angeles, and Alameda County. In March 2015, Harris announced the creation of a pilot program in coordination with the Los Angeles County Sheriff's Department called "Back on Track LA". Like Back on Track, first time, non-violent, non-sexual, offenders aged between 18 and 30 – 90 men participated in the pilot program for 24–30 months. Assigned a case manager, participants received education through a partnership with the Los Angeles Community College District and job training services.

=== Wrongful convictions and prison overcrowding ===
Harris's record on wrongful conviction cases as attorney general has been criticised by academics and activists. Law professor Lara Bazelon contends Harris "weaponized technicalities to keep wrongfully convicted people behind bars rather than allow them new trials". After the 2011 United States Supreme Court decision in Brown v. Plata declared California's prisons so overcrowded they inflicted cruel and unusual punishment, Harris fought federal supervision, explaining "I have a client, and I don't get to choose my client". Harris declined to take any position on criminal sentencing-reform initiatives Prop 36 (2012) and Prop 47 (2014), arguing it would be improper because her office prepares the ballot booklets. John Van de Kamp, a predecessor as attorney general, publicly disagreed with the rationale.

In September 2014, Harris's office argued unsuccessfully in a court filing against the early release of prisoners, citing the need for inmate firefighting labor. When the memo provoked headlines, Harris spoke out against it, saying she was unaware that her office had produced the memo. Since the 1940s, qualified California inmates have the option of volunteering to receive comprehensive training from the Cal Fire in exchange for sentence reductions and more comfortable prison accommodations; prison firefighters receive about $2 a day, and another $1 when fighting fires.

== LGBT rights ==
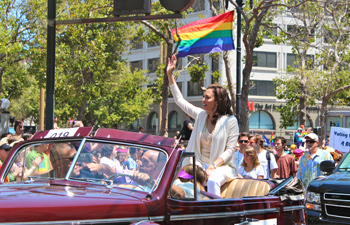
Harris at San Francisco Pride in 2013

=== Prop 8 opposition ===
In 2008, California voters passed Proposition 8, a state constitutional amendment providing that only marriages "between a man and a woman" are valid. Legal challenges were made by opponents soon after its approval, and a pair of same-sex couples filed a lawsuit against the initiative in federal court in the case of Perry v. Schwarzenegger (later Hollingsworth v. Perry). In their 2010 campaigns, California attorney general Jerry Brown and Harris both pledged to not defend Prop 8.

After being elected, Harris declared her office would not defend the marriage ban, leaving the task to Prop 8's proponents. In February 2013, Harris filed an amicus curiae brief, arguing Prop 8 was unconstitutional and that the initiative's sponsors did not have legal standing to represent California's interests by defending the law in federal court. In June 2013, the Supreme Court ruled, 5–4, that Prop 8's proponents lacked standing to defend it in federal court. The next day Harris delivered a speech in downtown Los Angeles urging the Ninth Circuit to lift the stay banning same-sex marriages as soon as possible. The stay was lifted two days later.

=== Gay and trans panic defense ban ===
In 2014, Attorney General Kamala Harris co-sponsored legislation to ban the gay and trans panic defense in court, which passed and California became the first state with such legislation.

=== Michelle-Lael B. Norsworthy v. Jeffrey Beard et al. ===
In February 2014, Michelle-Lael Norsworthy, a transgender inmate at California's Mule Creek State Prison, filed a federal lawsuit based on the California Department of Corrections and Rehabilitation's failure to provide her with what she argued was medically necessary sex reassignment surgery (SRS). In April 2015, a federal judge ordered the state to provide Norsworthy with SRS, finding that prison officials had been "deliberately indifferent to her serious medical need". Harris, representing CDCR, appealed the order to the Ninth Circuit Court of Appeals, arguing that psychotherapy, as well as the hormone therapy Norsworthy had been receiving for her gender dysphoria over the preceding fourteen years, were sufficient medical treatment, and there was "no evidence that Norsworthy is in serious, immediate physical or emotional danger". While Harris defended the state's position in court, she said she ultimately pushed the California Department of Corrections and Rehabilitation to change their policy. In August 2015, while the state's appeal was pending, Norsworthy was released on parole, obviating the state's duty to provide her with inmate medical care and rendering the case moot. In 2019, Harris stated that she took "full responsibility" for briefs her office filed in Norsworthy's case and others involving access to gender-affirming surgery for trans inmates.

== Public safety ==
=== Anti-truancy efforts ===
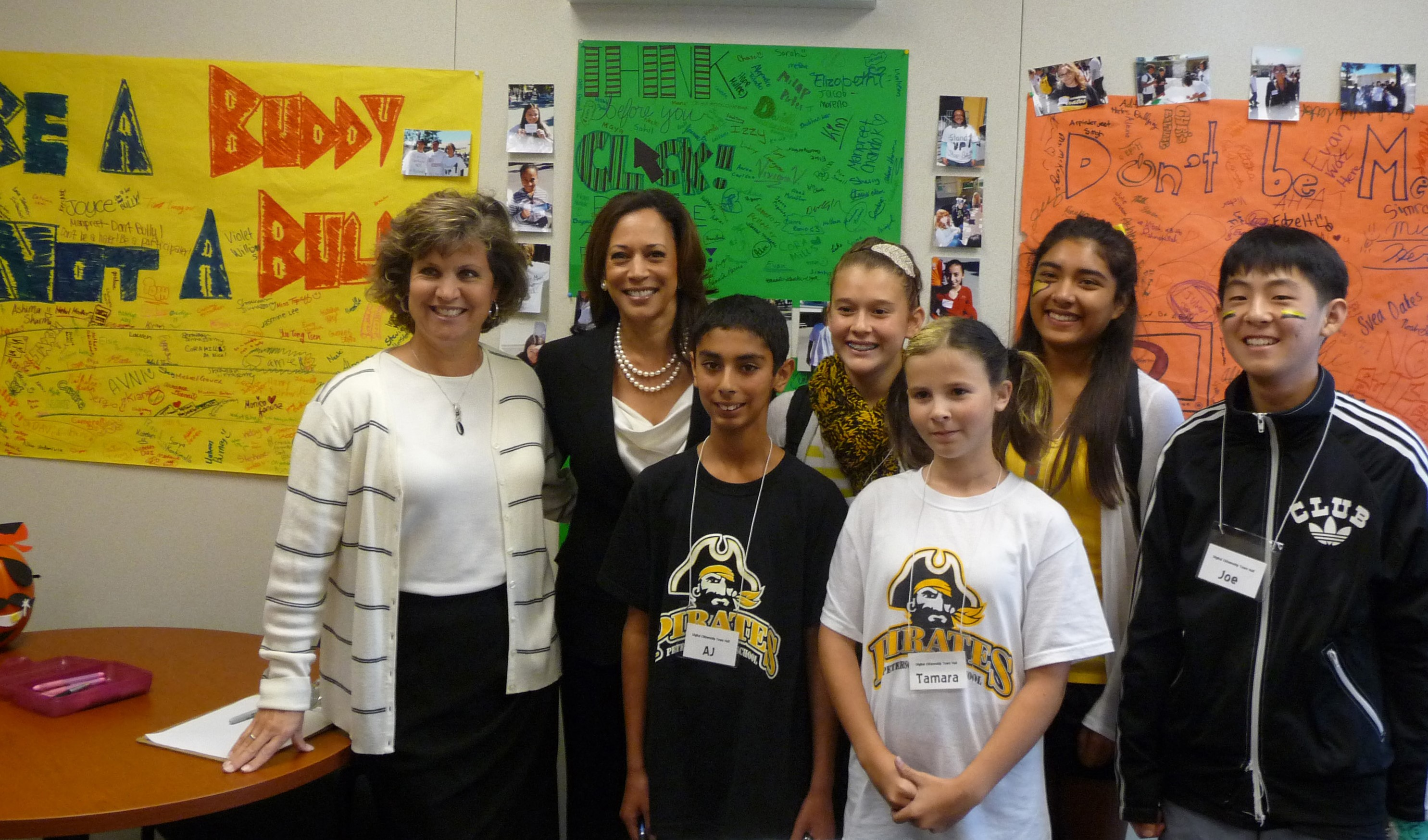
Harris visiting Peterson Middle School (Santa Clara Unified School District) in 2010

In 2011, Harris urged criminal penalties for parents of truant children as she did as District Attorney of San Francisco, allowing the court to defer judgment if the parent agreed to a mediation period to get their child back in school. Critics charged that local prosecutors implementing her directives were overzealous in their enforcement and Harris's policy adversely affected families. In 2013, Harris issued a report titled "In School + On Track", which found that more than 250,000 elementary school students in the state were "chronically absent" and the statewide truancy rate for elementary students in the 2012–2013 school year was nearly thirty percent, at a cost of nearly $1.4 billion to school districts, since funding is based on attendance rates.

=== Environmental protection ===
Harris prioritized environmental protection as attorney general, first securing a $44 million settlement to resolve all damages and costs associated with the Cosco Busan oil spill, in which a container ship collided with San Francisco–Oakland Bay Bridge and spilled 50,000 gallons of bunker fuel into the San Francisco Bay. In the aftermath of the 2015 Refugio oil spill, which deposited about 140,000 gallons of crude oil off the coast of Santa Barbara, California, Harris toured the coastline and directed her office's resources and attorneys to investigate possible criminal violations. Thereafter, operator Plains All American Pipeline was indicted on 46 criminal charges related to the spill, with one employee indicted on three criminal charges. In 2019, a Santa Barbara jury returned a verdict finding Plains guilty of failing to properly maintain its pipeline and another eight misdemeanor charges; they were sentenced to pay over $3 million in fines and assessments.

From 2015 to 2016, Harris secured multiple multi-million-dollar settlements with fuel service companies Chevron, BP, ARCO, Phillips 66, and ConocoPhillips to resolve allegations they failed to properly monitor the hazardous materials in its underground storage tanks used to store gasoline for retail sale at hundreds of California gas stations. In summer 2016, automaker Volkswagen AG agreed to pay up to $14.7 billion to settle a raft of claims related to so-called Defeat Devices used to cheat emissions standards on its diesel cars while actually emitting up to forty times the levels of harmful nitrogen oxides allowed under state and federal law. Harris and the chair of the California Air Resources Board, Mary D. Nichols, announced that California would receive $1.18 billion as well as another $86 million paid to the state of California in civil penalties.

=== Law enforcement ===
California's Prop 69 (2004) required law enforcement to collect DNA samples from any adult arrested for a felony and from individuals arrested for certain crimes. In 2012, Harris announced that the California Department of Justice had improved its DNA testing capabilities such that samples stored at the state's crime labs could now be analyzed four times faster, within thirty days. Accordingly, Harris reported that the Rapid DNA Service Team within the Bureau of Forensic Services had cleared California's DNA backlog for the first time. Harris's office was later awarded a $1.6 million grant from the Manhattan District Attorney's initiative to eliminate the backlogs of untested rape kits.

In 2015, Harris conducted a 90-day review of implicit bias in policing and police use of deadly force. In April 2015, Harris introduced the first of its kind "Principled Policing: Procedural Justice and Implicit Bias" training, designed in conjunction with Stanford University psychologist and professor Jennifer Eberhardt, to help law enforcement officers overcome barriers to neutral policing and rebuild trust between law enforcement and the community. All Command-level staff received the training. The training was part of a package of reforms introduced within the California Department of Justice, which also included additional resources deployed to increase the recruitment and hiring of diverse special agents, an expanded role for the department to investigate officer-related shooting investigations and community policing. The same year, Harris's California Department of Justice became the first statewide agency in the country to require all its police officers to wear body cameras. Harris also announced a new state law requiring every law enforcement agency in California to collect, report, and publish expanded statistics on how many people are shot, seriously injured or killed by peace officers throughout the state.

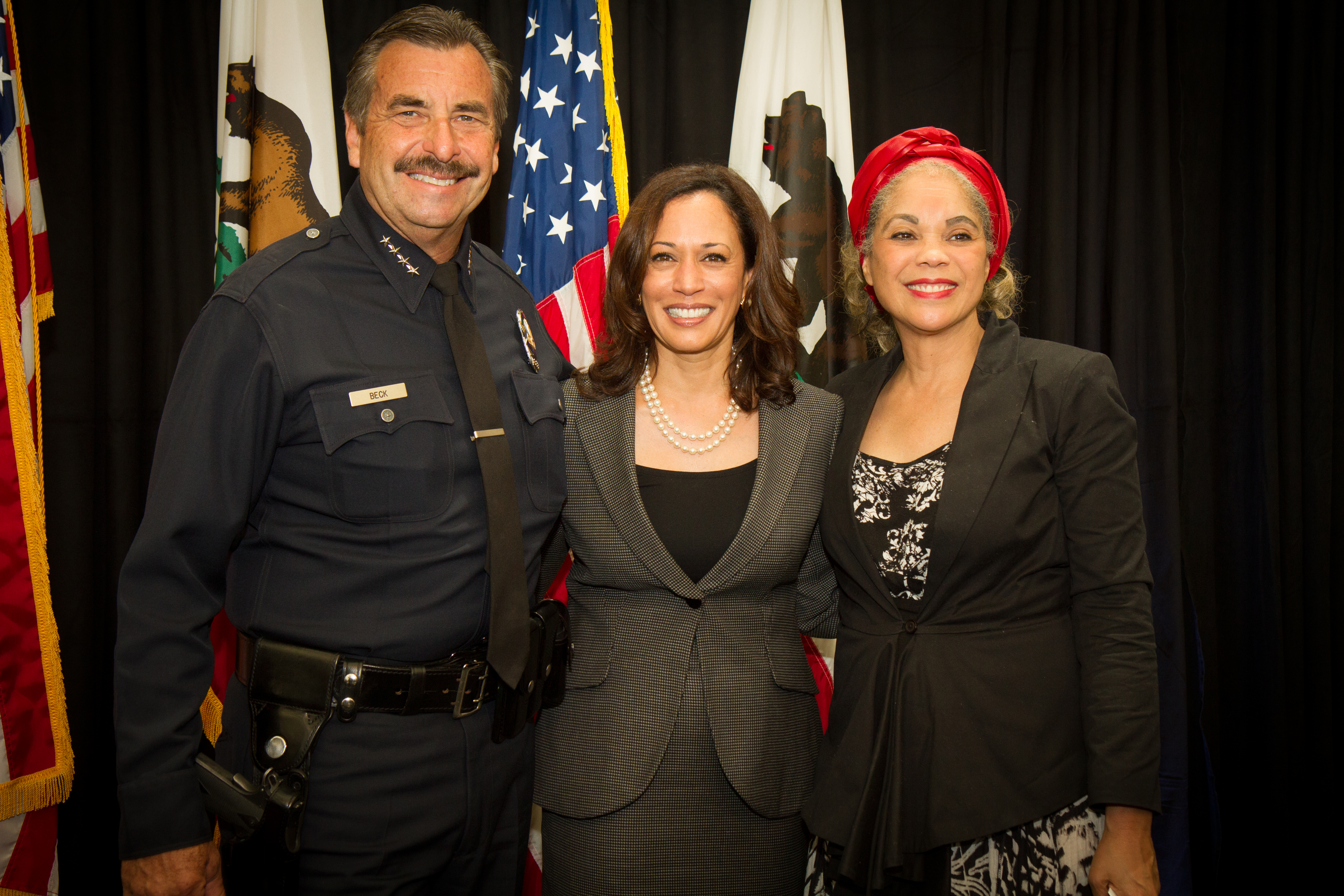
From left to right: LAPD chief Charlie Beck, Harris, and civil rights lawyer Constance L. Rice celebrate the 50th anniversary of the signing of the Civil Rights Act of 1964.

Later that year, Harris appealed a judge's order to take over the prosecution of a high-profile mass murder case and to eject all 250 prosecutors from the Orange County district attorney's office over allegations of misconduct by Republican D.A. Tony Rackauckas. Rackauckas was alleged to have illegally employed jailhouse informants and concealed evidence. Harris noted that it was unnecessary to ban all 250 prosecutors from working on the case, as only a few had been directly involved, later promising a narrower criminal investigation. The U.S. Department of Justice began an investigation into Rackauckas in December 2016, but he was not re-elected.

In 2016, Harris announced a patterns and practices investigation into purported civil rights violations and use of excessive force by the two largest law enforcement agencies in Kern County, California, the Bakersfield Police Department and the Kern County Sheriff's Department. Labeled the "deadliest police departments in America" in a five-part Guardian expose, a separate investigation commissioned by the ACLU and submitted to the California Department of Justice corroborated reports of police using excessive force.

=== Planned Parenthood ===
In 2016, Harris's office seized videos and other information from the apartment of an antiabortion activist who had made secret recordings and then accused Planned Parenthood doctors of illegally selling fetal tissue. Harris had announced that her office would investigate the activist in the summer of 2015. She was facing increasing criticism for not taking public action by the time Planned Parenthood filed a lawsuit against the activist.

=== Sex crimes ===
In 2011, Harris obtained a guilty plea and a four-year prison sentence from a stalker who used Facebook and social engineering techniques to illegally access the private photographs of women whose social media accounts he hijacked. Harris commented that the Internet had "opened up a new frontier for crime". Later that year, Harris created the eCrime Unit within the California Department of Justice, a 20-attorney unit targeting technology crimes. In 2015, several purveyors of so-called revenge porn sites based in California were arrested, charged with felonies, and sentenced to lengthy prison terms. In the first prosecution of its kind in the United States, Kevin Bollaert was convicted on 21 counts of identity theft and six counts of extortion and sentenced to 18 years in prison. Harris brought up these cases when California Congresswoman Katie Hill was targeted for similar cyber exploitation by her ex-husband and forced to resign in late 2019.

In 2016, Harris announced the arrest of Backpage CEO Carl Ferrer on felony charges of pimping a minor, pimping, and conspiracy to commit pimping. The warrant alleged that 99 percent of Backpage's revenue was directly attributable to prostitution-related ads, many of which involved victims of sex trafficking, including children under the age of 18. The pimping charge against Ferrer was dismissed by the California courts in 2016 on the grounds of Section 230 of the Communications Decency Act, but in 2018, Ferrer pleaded guilty in California to money laundering and agreed to give evidence against the former co-owners of Backpage. Ferrer simultaneously pleaded guilty to charges of money laundering and conspiracy to facilitate prostitution in Texas state court and Arizona federal court. Under pressure, Backpage announced that it was removing its adult section from all its U.S. sites. Harris welcomed the move, saying, "I look forward to them shutting down completely." The investigations continued after she became a senator, and, in April 2018, Backpage and affiliated sites were seized by federal law enforcement.

Harris's actions on Catholic Church sexual abuse cases has been criticized.

=== Transnational criminal organizations ===
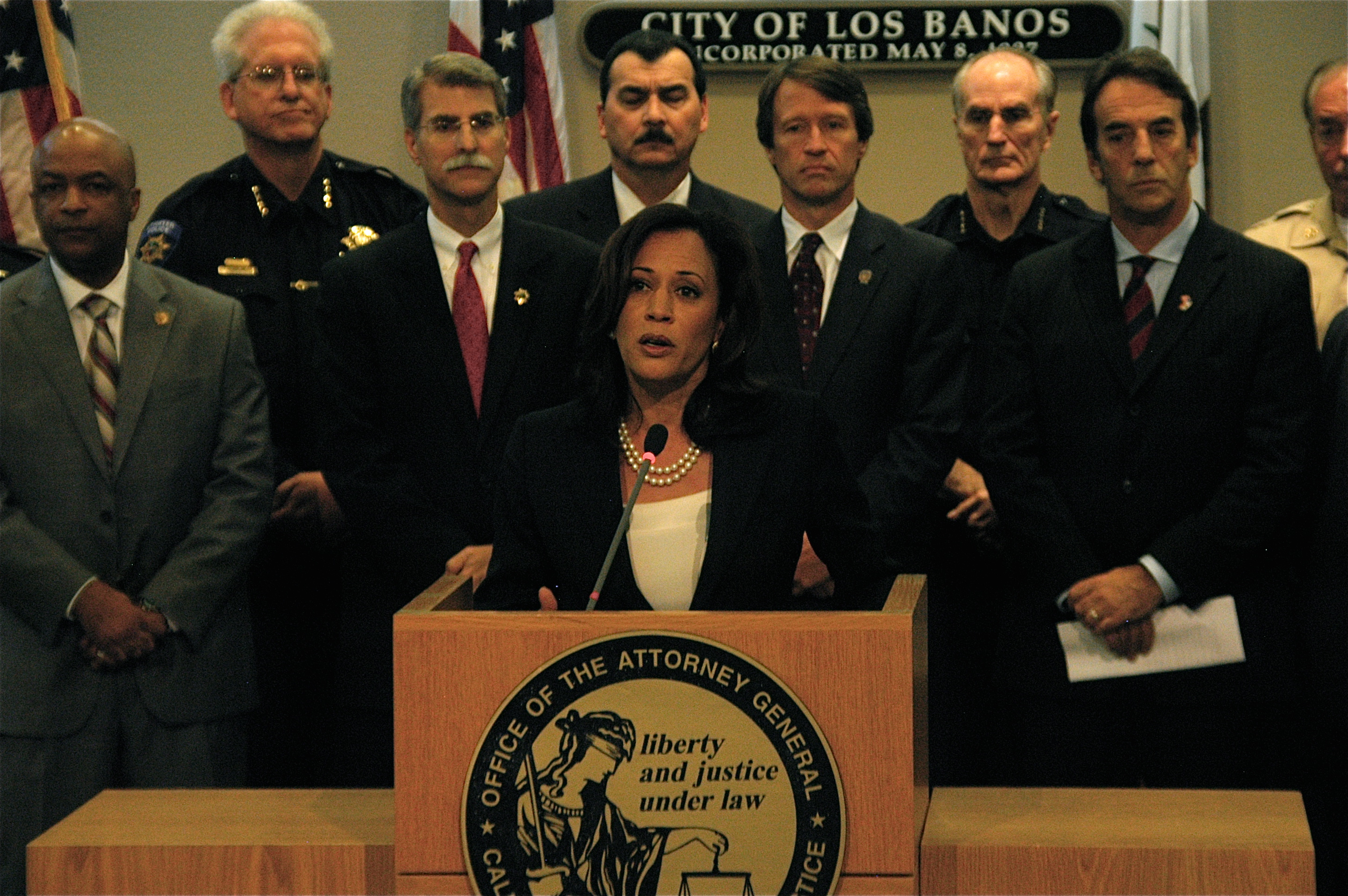
AG Harris announces the arrest of 101 gang members in Los Banos, California.

During her term as attorney general, Harris's office oversaw major investigations and prosecutions targeting transnational criminal organizations for their involvement in violent crime, fraud schemes, drug trafficking, and smuggling. Significant arrests and seizures (of weapons, drugs, cash, and other assets) under Harris targeted the Tijuana Cartel (2011), the Nuestra Familia, Norteños, and the Vagos Motorcycle Club (2011), the Norteños (2015), the Crips (2015), the Mexican Mafia (2016), and businesses in the Los Angeles Fashion District accused of operating a major money-laundering hub for Mexican narcotics traffickers (2014).

In summer 2012, Harris signed an accord with the Attorney General of Mexico, Marisela Morales, to improve coordination of law enforcement resources targeting transnational gangs engaging in the sale and trafficking of human beings across the San Ysidro border crossing. The accord called for closer integration on investigations between offices and sharing best practices. In 2012, Governor Jerry Brown signed into law two bills advanced by Harris to combat human trafficking. In November, Harris presented a report titled "The State of Human Trafficking in California 2012" at a symposium attended by U.S. Secretary of Labor Hilda Solis and Attorney General Morales, outlining the growing prevalence of human trafficking in the state, and highlighting the involvement of transnational gangs in the practice.

In early 2014, Harris issued a report titled, "Gangs Beyond Borders: California and the Fight Against Transnational Crime", addressing the prominent role of drug, weapons, and human trafficking, money laundering, and technology crimes employed by various drug cartels from Mexico, Armenian Power, 18th Street Gang, and MS-13 and offering recommendations for state and local law enforcement to combat the criminal activity. Later that year, Harris led a bipartisan delegation of state attorneys general to Mexico City to discuss transnational crime with Mexican prosecutors. Harris then convened a summit focused on the use of technology to fight transnational organized crime with state and federal officials from the U.S., Mexico, and El Salvador.
