= Ted Lieu =

American politician (born 1969)

- 劉雲平
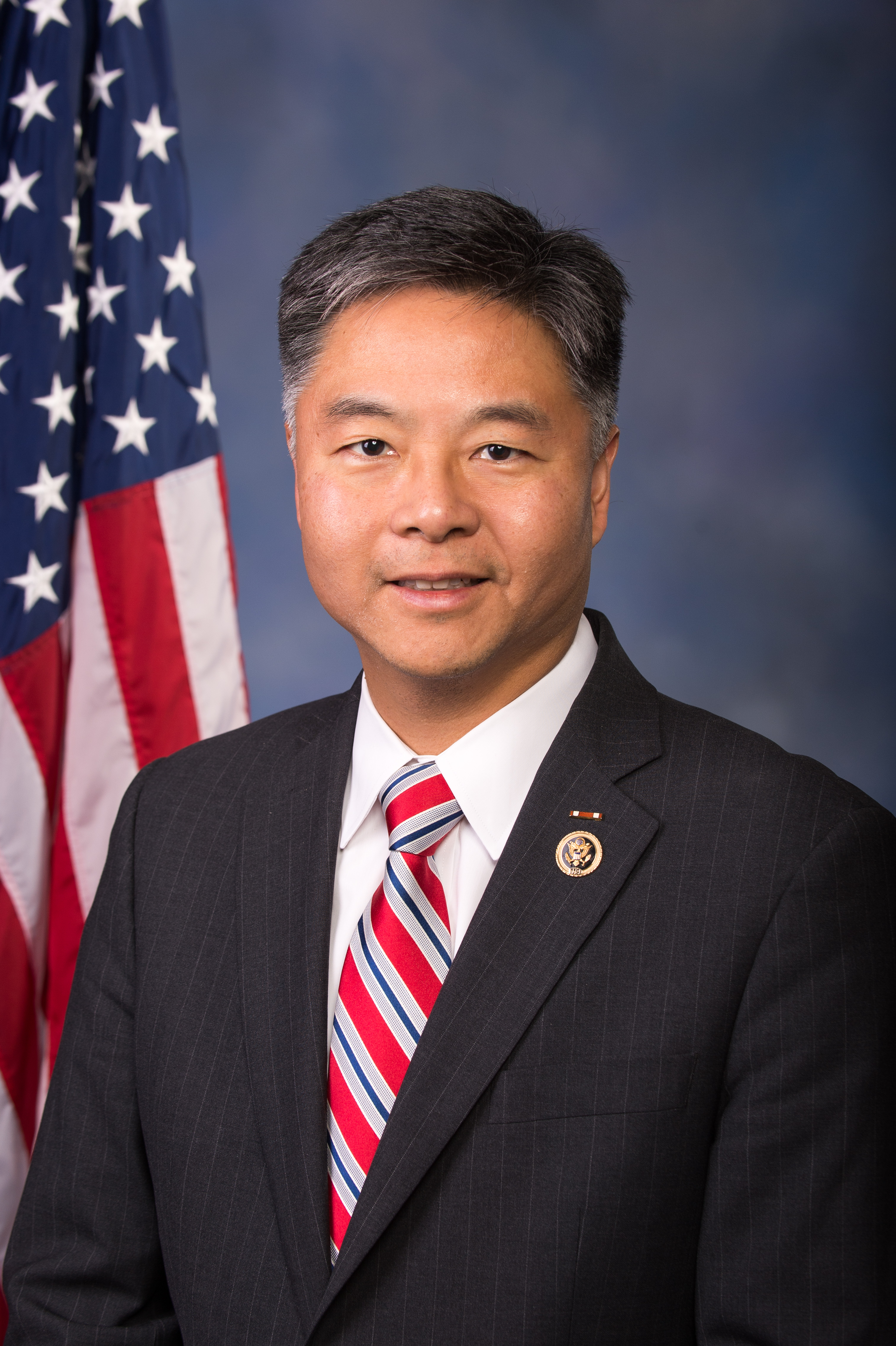
- Official portrait, 2016

Chair-elect of the House Democratic Caucus
- Assuming office January 3, 2027
- Leader: Hakeem Jeffries
- Succeeding: Pete Aguilar

Vice Chair of the House Democratic Caucus
- Incumbent
- Assumed office January 3, 2023
- Leader: Hakeem Jeffries
- Preceded by: Pete Aguilar

Co-Chair of the House Democratic Policy and Communications Committee
- In office January 3, 2019 – January 3, 2023 Serving with Matt Cartwright, Debbie Dingell, and Joe Neguse
- Leader: Nancy Pelosi
- Preceded by: Cheri Bustos; David Cicilline; Hakeem Jeffries
- Succeeded by: Veronica Escobar; Dean Phillips; Lauren Underwood

Member of the U.S. House of Representatives from California
- Incumbent
- Assumed office January 3, 2015
- Preceded by: Henry Waxman
- Constituency: 33rd district (2015–2023); 36th district (2023–present)

Member of the California State Senate from the 28th district
- In office February 18, 2011 – November 30, 2014
- Preceded by: Jenny Oropeza
- Succeeded by: Jeff Stone (redistricted)

Member of the California State Assembly from the 53rd district
- In office September 21, 2005 – November 30, 2010
- Preceded by: Mike Gordon
- Succeeded by: Betsy Butler

Personal details
- Born: Ted Win-Ping Lieu; March 29, 1969 (age 57) Taipei, Taiwan
- Party: Democratic
- Spouse: Betty Chim (m. 2002)
- Children: 2
- Education: Stanford University (BA, BS); Georgetown University (JD)
- Website: House website; Campaign website

Military service
- Allegiance: United States
- Branch/service: United States Air Force; Air Force Reserve
- Years of service: 1995–1999 (active); 2000–2021 (reserve)
- Rank: Colonel
- Unit: Air Force Judge Advocate General's Corps
- Awards: Meritorious Service Medal (1 oak leaf cluster); Air Force Commendation Medal

Chinese name
- Traditional Chinese: 劉雲平
- Simplified Chinese: 刘云平
Transcriptions
Standard Mandarin
- Hanyu Pinyin: Liú Yúnpíng
- Wade–Giles: Liu^{2} Yün^{2}-p'ing^{2}
- IPA: [ljǒʊ y̌n.pʰǐŋ]
- Lieu's voice Lieu on his amendment to the For the People Act of 2019. Recorded March 6, 2019

Ted Win-Ping Lieu (Chinese: 劉雲平; pinyin: Liú Yúnpíng; /ljuː/ LEW; born March 29, 1969) is a Taiwanese-born American lawyer and politician. He is a member of the Democratic Party and has represented California's 36th congressional district in the United States House of Representatives since 2023. He represented the 33rd congressional district from 2015 to 2023. The district includes South Bay and Westside regions of Los Angeles, as well as Beverly Hills, Santa Monica, the Palos Verdes Peninsula, and Beach Cities.

Born in Taiwan, Lieu is one of the few members of Congress who are naturalized U.S. citizens. He graduated with two degrees from Stanford University and earned his Juris Doctor degree from Georgetown University. He represented the 28th district in the California State Senate from 2011 to 2014, after being elected to fill the seat of deceased Senator Jenny Oropeza. From 2005 to 2010 he was a California state assemblyman, representing the 53rd district, after being elected to fill the seat of deceased assemblyman Mike Gordon.

Lieu served on active duty with the United States Air Force Judge Advocate General's Corps from 1995 to 1999. From 2000 to 2021 he served in the Air Force Reserve Command, and he attained the rank of colonel in 2015. House Democratic leader Nancy Pelosi appointed Lieu assistant whip of the 115th Congress in 2017. He has been vice chair of the House Democratic Caucus since 2023.

On November 18, 2026, Lieu was elected chair of the House Democratic Caucus for the 120th United States Congress, becoming the first Asian American to chair either party's House caucus and the highest-ranking Asian American in congressional history. According to his congressional office, he will also be the highest-ranking veteran and immigrant in House Democratic leadership. His term as caucus chair is scheduled to begin in January 2027.

== Early life and education ==
Lieu was born in 1969 in Taipei, Taiwan. His family immigrated to the United States when he was three years old, settling in Cleveland, Ohio. His paternal family was originally from Hebei, China. His father, Lieu Ten-ching (劉天擎; 1944–2026), was born in Chongqing, China, in 1944, moved to Taiwan in 1949 during the Great Retreat, and graduated from Soochow University and the Cleveland State University College of Law.

In 1987, Lieu graduated from Saint Ignatius High School. In 1991, he graduated from Stanford with a BSc in computer science and a BA in political science. As an undergraduate, he was a columnist for The Stanford Daily and studied under Condoleezza Rice. He then attended the Georgetown University Law Center, where he became the editor-in-chief of the Georgetown Law Journal, and earned his Juris Doctor, magna cum laude, in 1994.

== Early career ==
After law school, Lieu served as a law clerk to Judge Thomas Tang of the U.S. Court of Appeals for the Ninth Circuit from 1994 to 1995.

Lieu joined the United States Air Force in 1995 and served four years on active duty as a member of the Judge Advocate General's Corps. As a military prosecutor and adviser to commanders, he has received various awards and medals for his service, both abroad and locally, including the Meritorious Service Medal with one Oak Leaf Cluster, the Air Force Commendation Medal, and the Humanitarian Service Medal. Lieu continued to serve in the Air Force Reserve from 2000 to 2021; in this capacity, he was promoted to his terminal rank of colonel in December 2015.

=== Torrance City Council ===
On March 5, 2002, Lieu was elected to the Torrance City Council alongside Mike Mauno and Pat McIntyre. On April 9, they were sworn in to replace outgoing members Marcia Cribb, Jack Messerlian, and Dan Walker, who had been elected mayor. Lieu served until his election to the state assembly, and was succeeded by Rod Guyton via appointment.

== California State Legislature ==
=== California Assembly ===
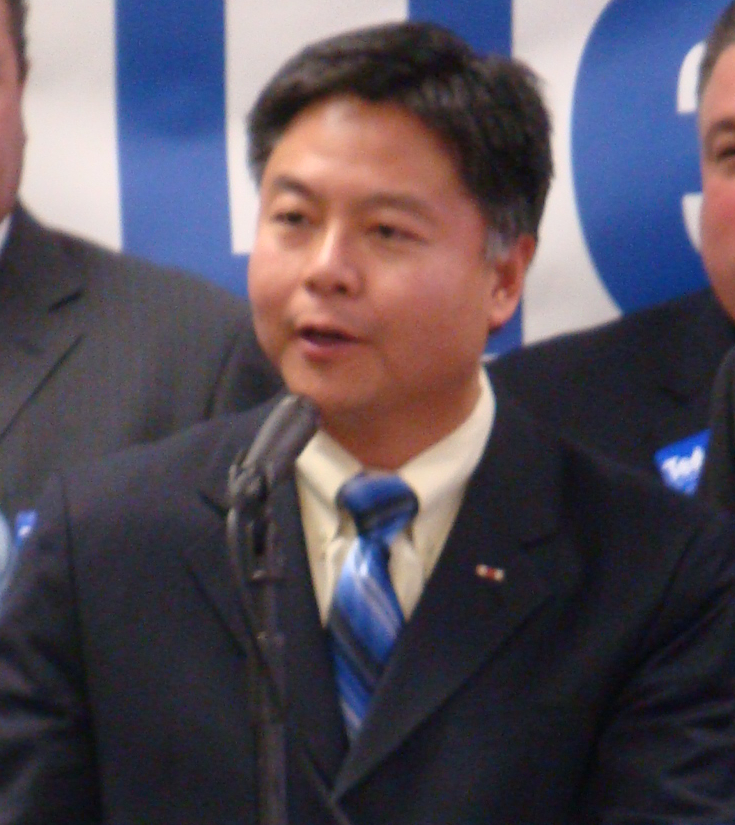
Lieu as a California State Senator, 2011

Lieu won a September 13, 2005, special election to fill the 53rd Assembly district following the death of incumbent Mike Gordon. Lieu defeated three Republicans, including physician Mary Jo Ford and fellow Torrance city councilman Paul Nowatka.

Lieu was reelected in 2006 and again in 2008.

Lieu was chair of the Assembly Rules Committee. He was a member of the Assembly Governmental Organization Committee, Assembly Judiciary Committee and Assembly Veterans Affairs Committee. Lieu was also chair of the Asian Pacific Islander Legislative Caucus and chair of the Assembly Select Committee on Aerospace. In 2014 he joined the newly founded Friends of Wales Caucus.

In 2008, in a surprising turn of events in the Ladies Professional Golf Association (LPGA) English language controversy, Lieu and state senator Leland Yee of San Francisco were able to help rescind the LPGA Tour Commission's suspension-penalty policy for players who failed to learn enough English to speak to sponsors and at award ceremonies. Both officials publicly challenged the legality and galvanized community attention to the LPGA's policy in August 2008 when it was released, which resulted in revision of the policy by the end of 2008.

Lieu is a strong supporter of expansion of public transit in West Los Angeles, LAX, and the South Bay.

Lieu coauthored a successful bill to bypass environmental quality regulations to build a football stadium in Los Angeles. The bill was intended to help the efforts of developer Edward P. Roski persuade the National Football League to return to the city, and was controversial among many environmentalists and legislators. Further controversy ensued when it was announced that Roski had given over $500,000 to political campaigns, including $13,000 to Lieu's.

==== Legislation ====
As an assemblyman, Lieu authored laws in the areas of public safety, child sex offenders, domestic violence, the environment, education, health care, veterans' issues and transportation.

Some of his legislative actions include the following:

- AB 1900 helps prevent convicted child sex offenders from working with children (Chapter 340, Statutes of 2006)
- ABx2 7, the California Foreclosure Prevention Act, requires lenders to operate a comprehensive home loan modification program or face a 90-day foreclosure moratorium. This is the first law of its kind in the nation (Chapter 5, Statutes of 2009)
- AB 2052 allows a victim of domestic violence to break a rental lease if the victim provides a police report or temporary restraining order to the landlord (Chapter 440, Statutes of 2008)
- AB 86 gives school districts the ability to discipline students who engage in cyberbullying (Chapter 646, Statutes of 2008)
- AB 800 requires reporting of sewage spills, thereby allowing the local public safety officials to close down beaches and public areas affected by such spills (Chapter 371, Statutes of 2007)
- AB 236 mandates the state to prioritize the purchase of fleet cars to enhance fuel efficiency and carbon reduction, and requires alternative-fuel-capable vehicles to use alternative fuels (Chapter 593, Statutes of 2007)
- AB 392 requires employers to give spouses of Armed Forces members returning from deployment two weeks of unpaid leave if requested by the spouse (Chapter 361, Statutes of 2007) and
- AB 1150 bans health insurance companies from providing financial incentives to their employees for terminating health care coverage of patients (Chapter 188, Statutes of 2008).

=== Run for Attorney General of California ===
Lieu sought the Democratic nomination in the 2010 California attorney general election. He finished fourth in the June primary, which was won by future Vice President Kamala Harris.

=== California Senate ===
Lieu won a February 15, 2011, special election to fill the 28th Senate district following the death of incumbent Jenny Oropeza. He defeated four Republicans, one Democrat, and two independents.

On January 30, 2014, Lieu voted in favor of California Senate Constitutional Amendment 5. The proposed bill asked California voters to repeal provisions of Proposition 209 and permit state universities to consider an applicant's race, ethnicity or national origin in making admissions decisions. After hearing strong opposition to the bill from the Asian-American community, Lieu, along with senators Leland Yee and Carol Liu, who had also voted for the bill, jointly issued a statement on February 27 calling for the bill to be withheld pending further consultations with the "affected communities".

== U.S. House of Representatives ==
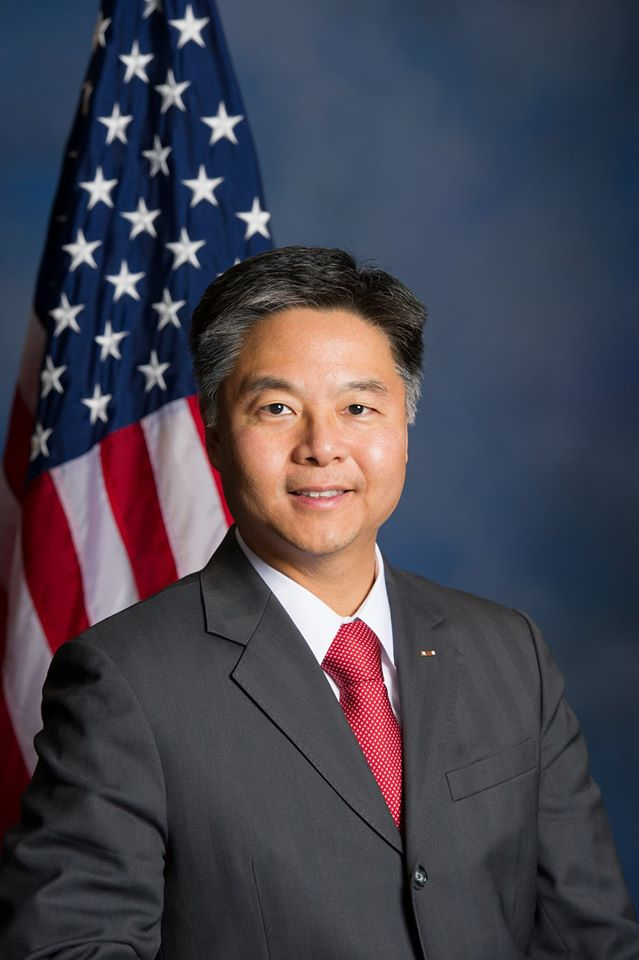
Official portrait, 2015

=== 2014 election ===
Lieu was the Democratic candidate for the 33rd congressional district, formerly represented by Henry Waxman, who retired in 2014 after 40 years in Congress. The 2010 redistricting placed a portion of Torrance, including Lieu's home, in the 33rd.

Lieu placed second in the June primary, but defeated Republican Elan Carr in the general election. He and Waxman are the only persons to represent this district since its creation in 1974 (it was the 24th from 1975 to 1993, the 29th from 1993 to 2003, the 30th from 2003 to 2013, and has been the 33rd since 2013).

=== Legislation ===
Lieu successfully passed three laws in the 114th Congress, securing $35 million in funding to the West Los Angeles VA for seismic retrofits; reauthorizing the Advisory Committee on Homeless Veterans; and restoring the Quarterly Financial Report. Lieu also introduced the Climate Solutions Act in the 114th Congress, which aimed to model national energy goals and climate emissions reduction targets after the state of California.

In the 115th Congress, Lieu introduced H.R. 669 – Restricting First Use of Nuclear Weapons Act of 2017, which would prohibit the president from using the Armed Forces to conduct a first-use nuclear strike unless such strike is conducted pursuant to a congressional declaration of war expressly authorizing such strike.

On March 8, 2017, Lieu introduced H.R. 1437 – No Money Bail Act of 2017. The bill proposes eliminating the money bail system for holding suspects in pretrial proceedings.

=== Tenure ===
Lieu is one of two Chinese American members of the 114th United States Congress, along with New York's Grace Meng.

He was voted Democratic Freshman Class president of the House by his colleagues, succeeding Joaquín Castro. Lieu serves on two influential committees in Congress: the House Judiciary Committee and the House Foreign Affairs Committee.

Lieu voted against the Iran deal.

Lieu received praise from the online privacy community when he introduced bipartisan legislation to prevent states from forcing companies to weaken encryption for law enforcement purposes.

On September 16, 2015, Lieu and Justin Amash introduced a bill to reduce funding for the Drug Enforcement Administration's Cannabis Eradication Program, under which real estate and chattels can be seized if they have been used for marijuana trafficking and abuse.

On July 22, it was announced that Lieu would speak at the 2016 Democratic National Convention, along with three other California House Democrats.

On November 6, 2017, while the House of Representatives chambers was holding a moment of silence was held for the 26 victims of a church shooting in Texas, Lieu filmed and posted a video message calling for gun law reform. Lieu said, "I've been to too many moments of silences. In just my short career in Congress, three of the worst mass shootings in U.S. history have occurred. I will not be silent. What we need is we need action. We need to pass gun safety legislation now."

Lieu is a member of the Congressional Progressive Caucus.

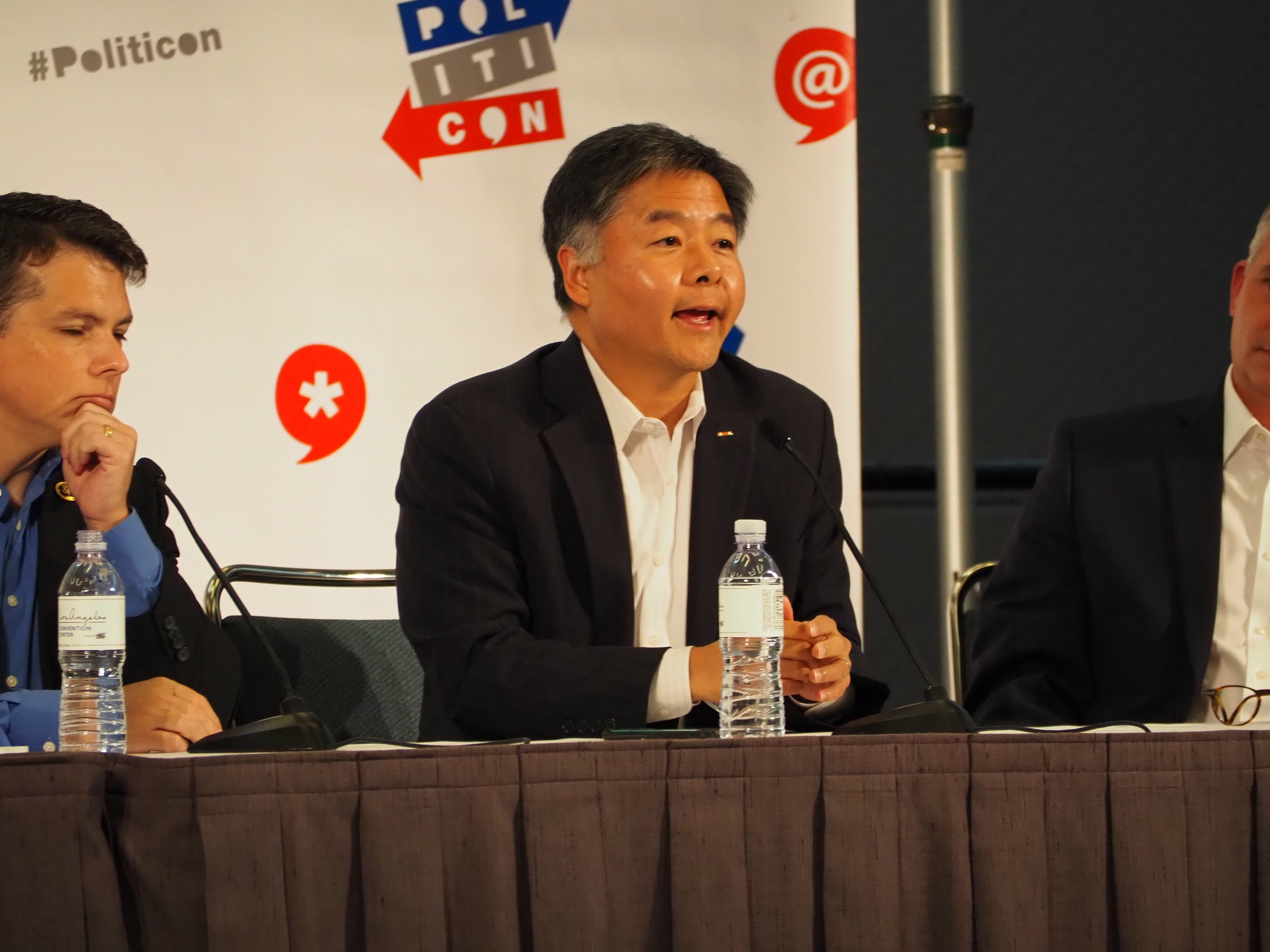
Lieu at Politicon 2018

On April 25, 2018, 57 members of the House of Representatives, including Lieu, released a condemnation of Holocaust distortion in Ukraine and Poland. They criticized Poland's new Holocaust law, which would criminalize accusing Poland of complicity in the Holocaust, and Ukraine's 2015 memory laws glorifying Ukrainian Insurgent Army (UPA) and its leaders, such as Roman Shukhevych.

In 2019, Lieu signed a letter led by Representative Ro Khanna and Senator Rand Paul to President Trump asserting that it is "long past time to rein in the use of force that goes beyond congressional authorization" and that they hoped this would "serve as a model for ending hostilities in the future—in particular, as you and your administration seek a political solution to our involvement in Afghanistan."

In December 2019, an attorney for congressman Devin Nunes sent a letter to Lieu threatening to sue over Lieu's comments about Nunes's relationship with Ukrainian-born American businessman Lev Parnas. In response, Lieu wrote, "I welcome any lawsuit from your client and look forward to taking discovery of Congressman Nunes. Or, you can take your letter and shove it."

In October 2020, Lieu co-signed a letter to Secretary of State Mike Pompeo that condemned Azerbaijan's offensive operations against the Armenian-populated enclave of Nagorno-Karabakh, denounced Turkey's role in the Nagorno-Karabakh conflict, and called for an immediate ceasefire.

On January 12, 2021, Lieu was named an impeachment manager (prosecutor) for the second impeachment trial of President Trump.

Lieu voted in favor of three military aid package supplementals for Ukraine, Israel, and Taiwan respectively in April 2024, along with most Democrats.

=== Committee assignments ===
For the 118th Congress:

- Committee on Foreign Affairs
- Committee on the Judiciary
  - Subcommittee on Courts, Intellectual Property, and the Internet

In the past Rep. Lieu has also served on the Committee on Science, Space, and Technology.

=== Caucus memberships ===
- Black Maternal Health Caucus
- House Baltic Caucus
- Congressional Arts Caucus
- Congressional Asian Pacific American Caucus (Whip)
- Congressional Equality Caucus
- Congressional Ukraine Caucus
- Veterinary Medicine Caucus
- U.S.-Japan Caucus
- Friends of Wales Caucus
- Medicare for All Caucus
- Congressional Progressive Caucus
- Congressional Direct Selling Caucus
- Congressional Caucus for the Equal Rights Amendment
- Congressional Taiwan Caucus
- Rare Disease Caucus

=== Campaign donations to Stanford University ===
From 2016 to 2018, Lieu made four donations totaling $51,046 from his campaign account to his alma mater, Stanford University. In 2020 Stanford admitted Lieu's eldest son, Brennan. National Review and The Washington Examiner raised questions about the propriety of the donations. An opinion writer for The Examiner noted that other members of Congress have donated to universities and asserted, "Lieu's $50,000 to Stanford is the second-largest contribution on record from an active congressional candidate to a college or university." Former FEC chairman Bradley Smith told the Review that donations to universities from campaign funds were not improper and "It's actually relatively common for congressmen, especially senators who might have big campaign funds built up, to give a bunch of money to their alma mater." In 2012–13, parental donations needed to be at least $500,000 (nearly ten times the amount of Lieu's donations) before a student would appear on the list the Office of Development provided to the Stanford admission office.

== Political positions ==
Lieu is considered a political progressive. He voted with President Joe Biden's stated position 100% of the time in the 117th Congress, according to a FiveThirtyEight analysis.

=== Abortion ===
Lieu describes himself as "100% pro-choice." As of 2022, he has a 100% rating from NARAL Pro-Choice America and an F grade from the Susan B. Anthony List for his abortion-related voting record. Lieu opposed the Supreme Court decision overturning of Roe v. Wade.

=== Civil rights and social justice ===
==== Banning sexual orientation conversion therapy ====
In 2012, Lieu authored a bill that bans the provision of sexual orientation change efforts (including conversion therapy) to minors. This bill passed both the State Assembly and Senate with substantial support, and was signed into law by Governor Jerry Brown in 2012. This made California the first U.S. state to have such a ban. Several other states and the District of Columbia have followed in enacting bans on sexual orientation change efforts with minors. As a U.S. representative, Lieu has introduced the Therapeutic Fraud Prevention Act, a bill for a federal ban on conversion therapy, following statements by President Obama opposing the practice.

=== Environment ===
==== Banning hydrofluoric acid at oil refineries ====
Lieu supports banning hydrofluoric acid (HF) at oil refineries, where it is often the chemical used for producing the high octane alkylate component of gasoline. He has pointed out the danger of storing the volatile chemical on site at refineries, where explosions are not uncommon, where there are limited safeguards against natural disasters and terrorist incidents, and where many plants already have long histories of limited accidental HF release incidents. A larger release could cause a toxic ground hugging cloud leading to a mass casualty event in the vicinity of the release site.

=== Immigration ===
ProPublica recording of crying children separated from their families played by Lieu on the House floor

On June 22, 2018, Lieu played an audio clip of children taken from their parents under the Trump administration family separation policy crying and calling for their parents. Karen Handel, Republican representative from Georgia, who was presiding over the session, called on Lieu to stop playing the clip, citing a rule (House Rule 17) that prohibits persons on the floor of the House from using "a mobile electronic device that impairs decorum." Lieu responded, "Why are we hiding this from the American people? I think the American people need to hear this."

=== Foreign affairs ===
==== Criticism of U.S. support for Saudi Arabia ====
Lieu has been publicly raising concerns over U.S. support for Saudi Arabian-led intervention in Yemen. In March 2016 he sent a letter to Secretary of State John Kerry and Secretary of Defense Ash Carter. Lieu wrote in the letter that the "apparent indiscriminate airstrikes on civilian targets in Yemen seem to suggest that either the coalition is grossly negligent in its targeting or is intentionally targeting innocent civilians. ... Some of these strikes look like war crimes to me, and I want to get answers as to why the U.S. appears to be assisting in the execution of war crimes in Yemen."

In April 2017 Lieu again criticized U.S. involvement in Saudi Arabian military campaign in Yemen, highlighting that Al Qaeda in Yemen "has emerged as a de facto ally of the Saudi-led militaries with whom [Trump] administration aims to partner more closely."

==== Foreign espionage ====
In 2015, Lieu called for a Justice Department investigation into the arrests of several Chinese-American scientists for espionage. On February 13, 2018, in a Senate Select Committee on Intelligence hearing focused on Chinese espionage in the United States, Senator Marco Rubio asked FBI director Christopher A. Wray about the risk posed by China's students in advanced science and mathematics programs. Lieu criticized Wray's response as "irresponsible generalizations" implying that all Chinese students and scholars were spies.

=== Artificial Intelligence ===
In 2023, after the release of ChatGPT, Lieu wrote in the New York Times to call for regulation of artificial intelligence, arguing that "Failure to do so could lead to a future where the risks of AI far outweigh its benefits." Later the same year, Lieu signed an open letter from the Center for AI Safety, which stated "Mitigating the risk of extinction from AI should be a global priority alongside other societal-scale risks such as pandemics and nuclear war."

In July 2026, Lieu and U.S. representative Nathaniel Moran introduced the AI Kill Switch Act, which would require developers of advanced AI systems to maintain the technical capability to throttle, suspend or shut down their systems.

== Personal life ==
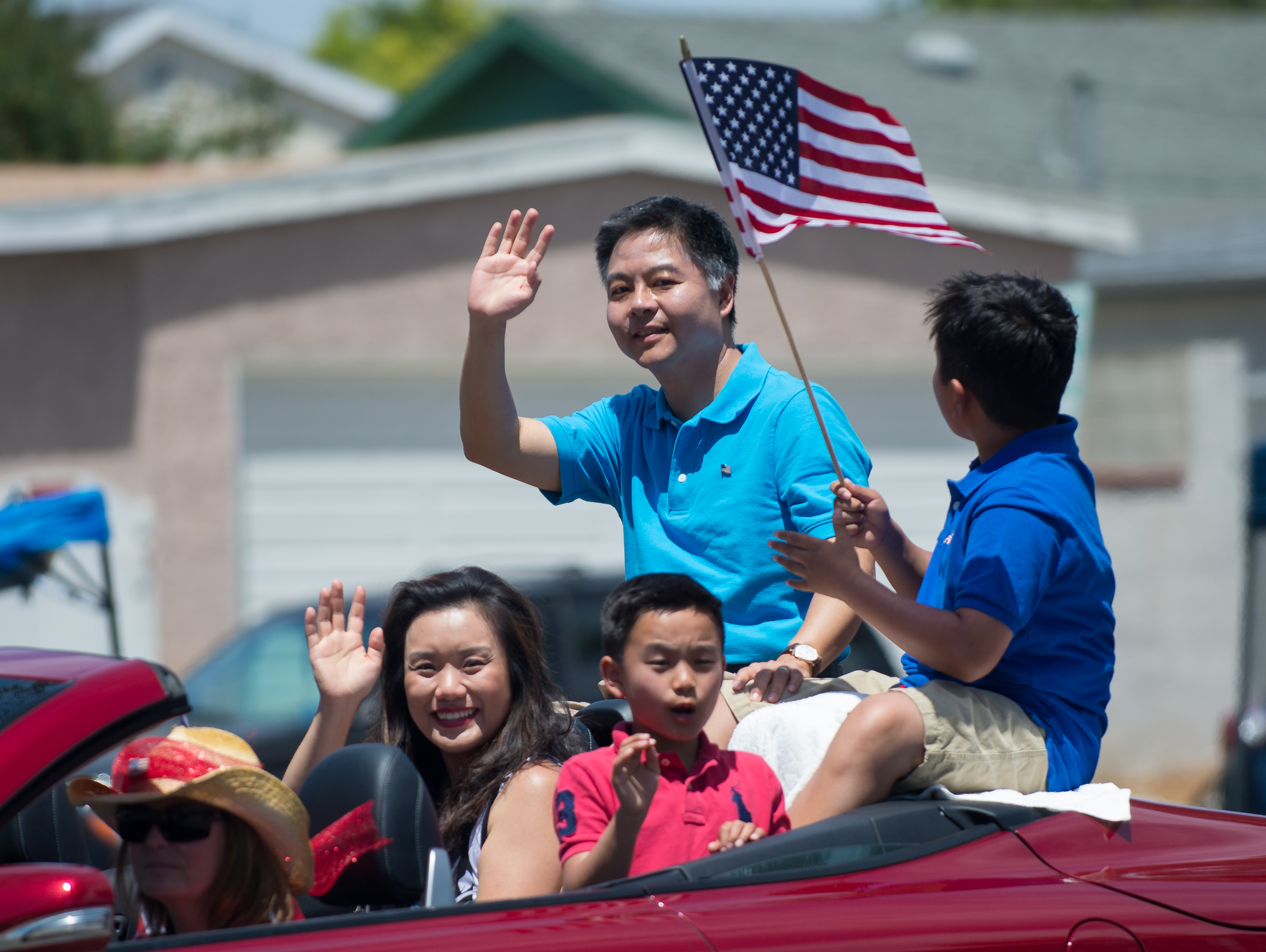
Ted Lieu and his family, 2014

Lieu and his wife Betty Lieu (a former California deputy attorney general) reside in Torrance, California, with their two sons, Brennan and Austin. Lieu is Catholic.

In 2023, Lieu was honored with the Carnegie Corporation of New York's Great Immigrants Award.

== Electoral history ==
=== California State Legislature ===
California State Assembly special election, 2005: District 53
Party	Candidate	Votes	%
Democratic	Ted Lieu	25,285	59.94
Republican	Mary Jo Ford	8,108	19.22
Republican	Paul Nowatka	4,928	11.68
Republican	Greg Hill	2,109	5.00
Republican	Paul Whitehead	912	2.16
Peace and Freedom	James R. Smith	843	2.00
Total votes		42,185	100
Democratic hold			

California State Assembly election, 2006: District 53
Party	Candidate	Votes	%
Democratic	Ted Lieu (incumbent)	75,491	58.48
Republican	Mary Jo Ford	47,534	36.82
Green	Peter Thottam	3,070	2.38
Peace and Freedom	Karl Abrams	2,997	2.32
Total votes		129,092	100
Democratic hold			

California State Assembly election, 2008: District 53
Party	Candidate	Votes	%
Democratic	Ted Lieu (incumbent)	127,117	67.33
Republican	Thomas Vidal	61,692	32.67
Total votes		188,809	100
Democratic hold			

California Attorney General election, 2010: Democratic primary
Party	Candidate	Votes	%
Democratic	Kamala Harris	762,995	33.53
Democratic	Alberto Torrico	354,792	15.59
Democratic	Chris Kelly	350,757	15.41
Democratic	Ted Lieu	237,618	10.44
Democratic	Pedro Nava	222,941	9.80
Democratic	Rocky Delgadillo	219,494	9.64
Democratic	Mike Schmier	127,291	5.59
Total votes		2,275,888	100

California State Senate special election, 2011: District 28
Party	Candidate	Votes	%
Democratic	Ted Lieu	31,723	56.72
Republican	Bob Valentine	14,141	25.28
Republican	Martha Flores-Gibson	3,885	6.95
No Party Preference	Mark Lipman	1,912	3.42
Democratic	Kevin Thomas McGurk	1,416	2.53
Republican	James Thompson	1,301	2.33
Republican	Jeffrey Fortini	1,246	2.23
No Party Preference	Michael Chamness	309	0.55
Total votes		55,933	100
Democratic hold			

=== United States Congress ===
US House election, 2014: California District 33
Primary election
Party	Candidate	Votes	%
Republican	Elan Carr	23,476	21.61
Democratic	Ted Lieu	20,432	18.81
Democratic	Wendy Greuel	17,988	16.56
No Party Preference	Marianne Williamson	14,335	13.19
Democratic	Matt Miller	13,005	11.97
Republican	Lily Gilani	7,673	7.06
Republican	Kevin Mottus	2,561	2.36
Democratic	Barbara Mulvaney	2,516	2.32
Democratic	David Kanuth	1,554	1.43
Democratic	Kristie Holmes	994	0.91
Libertarian	Mark Matthew Herd	883	0.81
Green	Michael Ian Sachs	732	0.67
Democratic	Michael Shapiro	650	0.60
No Party Preference	Tom Fox	509	0.47
Democratic	Zein E. Obagi Jr.	477	0.44
Democratic	Vincent Flaherty	345	0.32
Democratic	James Graf	327	0.30
No Party Preference	Brent Roske	188	0.17
Write-in		1	0.00
Total votes		108,646	100
General election
Democratic	Ted Lieu	108,331	59.19
Republican	Elan Carr	74,700	40.81
Total votes		183,031	100
Democratic hold			

US House election, 2016: California District 33
Party	Candidate	Votes	%
Democratic	Ted Lieu (incumbent)	219,397	66.44
Republican	Kenneth Wright	110,822	33.56
Total votes		330,219	100
Democratic hold			

US House election, 2018: California District 33
Primary election
Party	Candidate	Votes	%
Democratic	Ted Lieu (incumbent)	100,581	61.71
Republican	Kenneth Wright	48,985	30.05
Democratic	Emory Rodgers	13,435	8.24
Total votes		163,001	100
General election
Democratic	Ted Lieu (incumbent)	219,091	70.03
Republican	Kenneth Wright	93,769	29.97
Total votes		312,860	100
Democratic hold			

US House election, 2020: California District 33
Primary election
Party	Candidate	Votes	%
Democratic	Ted Lieu (incumbent)	130,063	60.47
Republican	James Bradley	37,531	17.45
Democratic	Liz Barris	15,180	7.08
Republican	Sarah Sun Liew	13,601	6.32
No Party Preference	Kenneth Wright	9,673	4.50
Democratic	Albert Maxwell Goldberg	9,032	4.20
Total votes		215,080	100
General election
Democratic	Ted Lieu (incumbent)	257,094	67.58
Republican	James Bradley	123,334	32.42
Total votes		380,428	100
Democratic hold			

US House election, 2022: California District 36
Primary election
Party	Candidate	Votes	%
Democratic	Ted Lieu (incumbent)	122,969	67.10
Republican	Joe Collins III	24,553	13.40
Republican	Derrick Gates	10,263	5.60
Republican	Ariana Hakami	9,760	5.33
Republican	Claire Ragge	7,351	4.01
Democratic	Colin Obrien	6,221	3.39
No Party Preference	Steve Williams	1,180	0.64
No Party Preference	Matthew Jesuele	976	0.53
Total votes		183,273	100
General election
Democratic	Ted Lieu (incumbent)	194,299	69.75
Republican	Joe Collins III	84,264	30.25
Total votes		278,563	100
Democratic hold			

US House election, 2024: California District 36
Primary election
Party	Candidate	Votes	%
Democratic	Ted Lieu (incumbent)	125,858	68.54
Republican	Melissa Toomim	27,440	14.94
Republican	Ariana Hakami	25,823	14.06
No Party Preference	Claire Anderson	4,509	2.46
Total votes		183,630	100
General election
Democratic	Ted Lieu (incumbent)	246,002	68.72
Republican	Melissa Toomim	111,985	31.28
Total votes		357,987	100
Democratic hold			

US House election, 2026: California District 36
Primary election
Party	Candidate	Votes	%
Democratic	Ted Lieu (incumbent)	142,982	60.94
Republican	Houston Brignano	35,851	15.28
Republican	Melissa Toomim	30,653	13.06
Democratic	Marianne Shamma	17,000	7.24
Democratic	Rustin Knudtson	3,001	1.28
Democratic	Frederick Reardon	2,688	1.15
No party preference	Claire Anderson	2,470	1.05
Total votes		234,645	100

== See also ==
- List of Asian Americans and Pacific Islands Americans in the United States Congress
- Chinese Americans in Los Angeles

U.S. House of Representatives
Preceded by Henry Waxman	Member of the U.S. House of Representatives from California's 33rd congressional district 2015–2023	Succeeded by Pete Aguilar
Preceded by Raul Ruiz	Member of the U.S. House of Representatives from California's 36th congressional district 2023–present	Incumbent
New office	Ranking Member of the House Artificial Intelligence Task Force; 2024–2025	Position abolished
Party political offices
Preceded by Pete Aguilar	Vice Chair of the House Democratic Caucus; 2023–present	Incumbent
U.S. order of precedence (ceremonial)
Preceded by French Hill	United States representatives by seniority 137th	Succeeded by Barry Loudermilk
