= Metropolitan News-Enterprise =

Daily legal newspaper published in Los Angeles, California

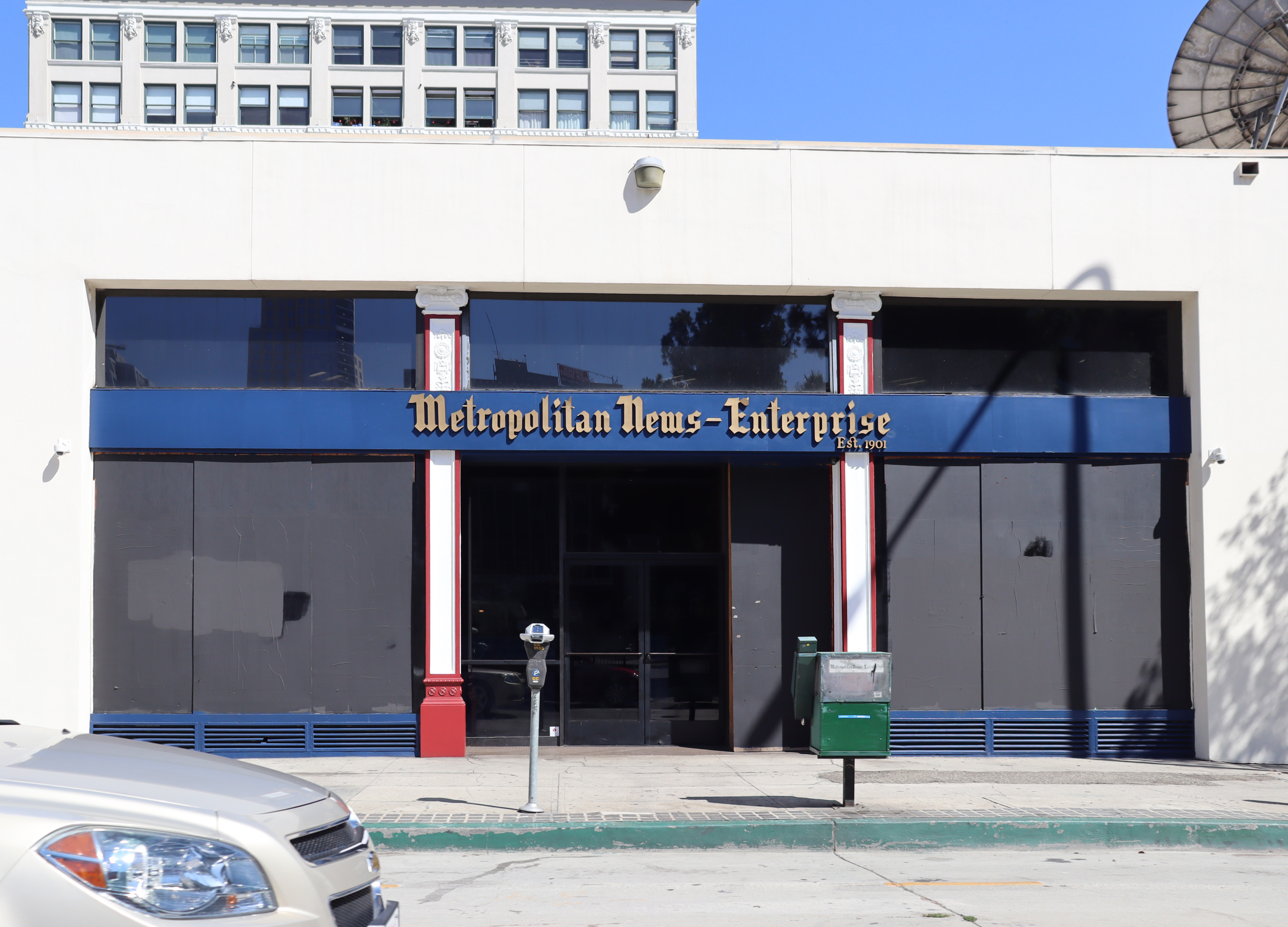
- Entrance to newspaper headquarters in Los Angeles
- Type: Daily newspaper
- Owner: Metropolitan News Company
- Publisher: Roger M. Grace and Jo-Ann W. Grace
- Editor: Roger M. Grace
- Founded: 1901; 125 years ago
- Language: English
- Headquarters: Los Angeles, California
- Country: United States
- Circulation: 2,500 (as of 2002)
- ISSN: 0897-2281
- OCLC number: 7024015
- Website: metnews.com

Metropolitan News-Enterprise, also known as MetNews or Met News, is a daily legal newspaper published in Los Angeles, California.

== History ==
The Enterprise newspaper was founded in 1901 and the Metropolitan News in 1945. The two newspapers merged to become Metropolitan News-Enterprise in 1987. The newspaper's co-publishers are lawyers Roger Grace and Jo-Ann Grace, a husband-and-wife team.

== Influence ==
MetNews is well known for its thorough coverage of judicial campaigns in the Los Angeles area. For example, in 2008 the newspaper determined that William Daniel Johnson, a candidate for Los Angeles County Superior Court, was "a white supremacist who has advocated the deportation of non-whites from the United States."

The newspaper began honoring selected legal professionals as "Persons of the Year" in 1983. Since then, honorees have included Victor E. Chavez, Tani Cantil-Sakauye, Steve Cooley, George Deukmejian, Ronald M. George, Mildred Lillie, Dan Lungren, Stanley Mosk, and Deanell Reece Tacha.

== Controversies ==
In 1992, the newspaper filed a lawsuit against the presiding judge of the Los Angeles County Superior Court alleging that the judge falsely imprisoned three employees for distributing a parody memorandum supposedly signed by the judge. In turn, the judge countersued the newspaper for defamation. After appeals, the lawsuit by the judge was eventually decided in favor of the newspaper; in 1994, the newspaper received $40,000 in a settlement for its lawsuit against the judge.

MetNews sued the Daily Journal Corporation, whose chairman is Charlie Munger, in 1997 for predatory pricing. In specific, the allegation was that the Daily Journal sold legal notices by companies such as Fannie Mae at a price below cost. In 2000, the case was resolved in favor of the Daily Journal.

In 2002, Los Angeles County District Attorney Steve Cooley obtained a search warrant to locate evidence at the newspaper's offices that a law firm had paid for an advertisement concerning a recall petition. The search closed the offices for three hours. Experts on the First Amendment to the United States Constitution characterized the situation as "troubling" and "inappropriate." Editor & Publisher magazine used terms such as "boneheaded" and "inexcusable" to describe the "newsroom raid." The newspaper filed a lawsuit against Cooley, which was settled with a payment of $40,000 and an agreement that Cooley's office would take measures to comply with the Privacy Protection Act of 1980.

To fill vacancies in California courts of appeal, the Governor of California submits names to the State Bar of California for confidential evaluations prior to formally nominating them. In August 2009, the newspaper reported that the State Bar had rated Chuck Poochigian "not qualified" for a state appeals court because he lacked legal experience. The leak occurred before Governor Arnold Schwarzenegger nominated Poochigian, and the State Bar was unable to determine the source of the leak.

== Other publications ==
In addition to the Metropolitan News-Enterprise, the Metropolitan News Company publishes the:

- Los Angeles Bulletin (weekdays)
- North County Spectrum, Escondido (weekly)
- Nuestra Comunidad y Lynwood Journal (weekly)
- Jurupa Valley Times, Riverside (weekly)
- Sacramento Bulletin (weekly)
- San Bernardino Bulletin (weekly)
