= Steve Cooley =

American politician and prosecutor

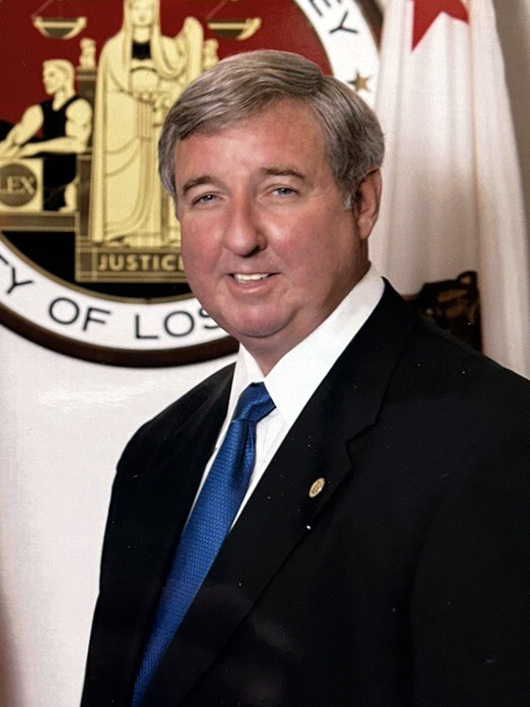
- Official portrait, 2005

41st District Attorney of Los Angeles County
- In office December 4, 2000 – December 3, 2012
- Preceded by: Gil Garcetti
- Succeeded by: Jackie Lacey

Personal details
- Born: Stephen Lawrence Cooley; May 1, 1947 (age 79) Los Angeles, California, U.S.
- Party: Republican
- Spouse: Jana Cooley (m. 1975)
- Children: 2
- Education: California State University, Los Angeles; USC Gould School of Law
- Occupation: Criminal prosecutor
- Website: www.stevecooley.com

Stephen Lawrence Cooley (born May 1, 1947) is an American politician and prosecutor. He was the Los Angeles County District Attorney from 2000 to 2012. Cooley was re-elected in 2004 and again in 2008.

In 2010, Cooley won the Republican nomination for California Attorney General against John C. Eastman and Tom Harman in the June 8 primary election. During the general election campaign, Cooley said he would defend Proposition 8, a 2008 ballot measure that banned same-sex marriages in California but was then being appealed in the federal courts. Cooley lost to the Democratic nominee, then-San Francisco District Attorney and future U.S. Senator and Vice President Kamala Harris in the November 2 general election, a close race, the results of which were not finalized until November 24, 2010.

== Early life and education ==
The second of five children, Cooley was born at St. Vincent's Hospital (now St. Vincent's Medical Center) in Los Angeles. His father was an FBI agent and his mother a homemaker. Cooley attended Pater Noster High School in Los Angeles. At California State University, Los Angeles, Cooley served two terms as student body president and was selected for membership in Phi Kappa Phi. He was also a member of Zeta Beta Tau fraternity.

In 1970, he was commencement speaker for his graduating class. He entered the University of Southern California Law School and received his Juris Doctor in 1973. That same year he joined the Los Angeles County District Attorney's Office. Cooley served over seven years as a reserve police officer with LAPD and 27 years as prosecutor.

== Los Angeles County District Attorney ==
Cooley challenged two-term incumbent District Attorney Gil Garcetti in the 2000 election. Garcetti and Cooley had a longstanding personal and professional rivalry, going back to at least 1996 when Cooley supported Garcetti's opponent for re-election, John Lynch. Garcetti defeated Lynch by a margin of approximately 5,000 votes out of slightly more than 2.2 million votes. After the election, Garcetti demoted Cooley from a supervisory position to the county's obscure Welfare Fraud division. The move mirrored Garcetti's demotion as the chief deputy for the entire county in 1988 by then-incumbent Ira Reiner, which caused Garcetti to challenge his former mentor and defeat him in the 1992 general election.

Cooley upset Garcetti in a competitive three-person primary, taking 39 percent of the vote to Garcetti's 37, forcing the two into a runoff in the November general election. In the two-person runoff, Cooley defeated Garcetti 64 to 36 percent.

He was the first attorney with trial experience to be elected District Attorney since 1984. At his 2000 swearing-in ceremony, he charged his over 1,000 prosecutors – including more than 300 District Attorney investigators and 600 clerical, technical and support staff – to "show no fear in pursuing the criminal element, but also be fearless in the pursuit of justice."

=== First term ===
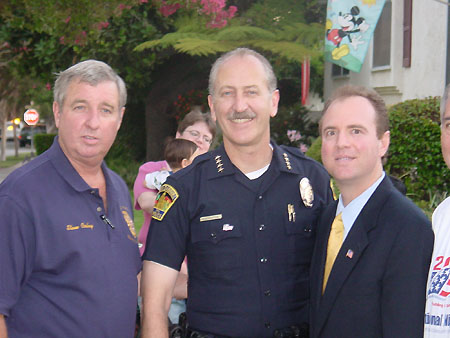
Cooley with San Gabriel Police Chief David Lawton and Congressman Adam Schiff, 2002.

Cooley instituted a reorganization of the District Attorney's Office. On April 9, 2003, he announced that he was closing the office's Environmental Crimes unit. The closure left only one attorney to cover all environmental crimes in Los Angeles County. The reorganization also included the creation of the Justice System Integrity Division, Forensic Science Section and Victim Impact Program. Cooley changed the office's policy on California's Three Strikes Law, with the stated purpose to assure proportionality in sentencing and even-handed application countywide. Throughout his time as District Attorney, Cooley continued his efforts against the Three Strikes Law in favor of proportionality, including supporting ballot measures that would have altered Three Strikes. The blowback from those efforts ultimately led Cooley to leave the California District Attorneys Association in 2006.

As District Attorney, Cooley first made the headlines in the prosecution of Winona Ryder for shoplifting. Cooley filed four felony charges against her and assigned a team of eight prosecutors and paralegals in what was described by British newspaper The Guardian as a "show-trial." Cooley was subsequently admonished by the California bar for his actions.

=== Second term ===
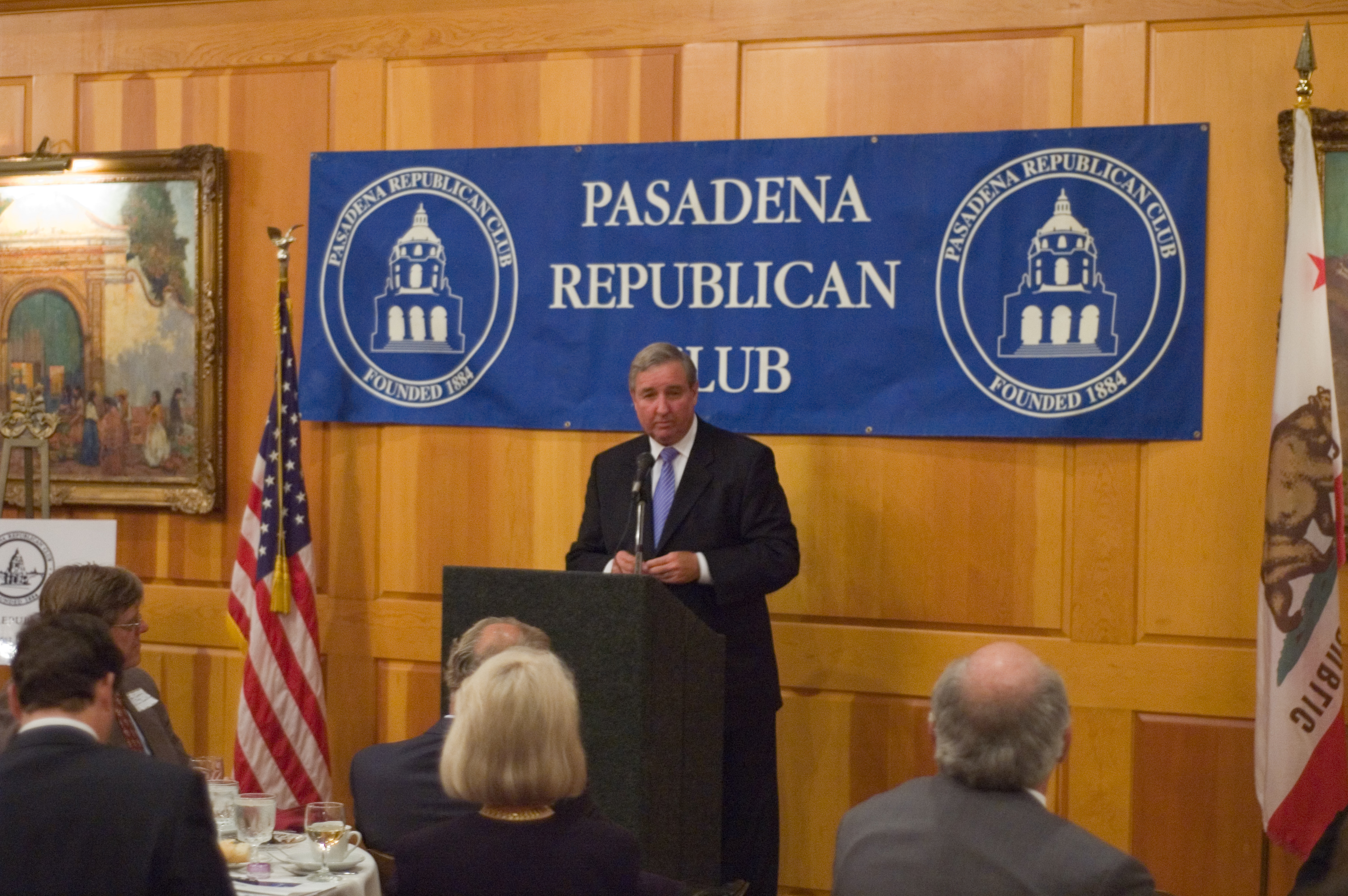
Cooley speaking at the Pasadena Republican Club, 2007

In 2006, Cooley was the most notable law enforcement official to publicly oppose Proposition 83, better known as "Jessica's Law," a measure named after Jessica Lunsford, a 9-year-old who was raped and murdered by a paroled sex offender in Florida. Cooley criticized Jessica's Law as being "not carefully crafted," adding that "Not liking sex offenders is a good thing and a popular thing, but when you are creating something to deal with them you have to think it through." California voters passed Proposition 83 with 70.5% of the vote.

During his second term, Cooley's office was unsuccessful in the prosecution of Robert Blake for the murder of his wife Bonnie Lee Bakley. When interviewed about Blake's acquittal, Cooley publicly called members of the jury who acquitted Blake "incredibly stupid" and refused to apologize for the statement.

According to the Los Angeles Times, advocates for battered women criticized Cooley's handling of Deborah Peagler's case and others like it. In eight out of eight cases, he opposed the use of a California law that allows battered women in prison to be given a new hearing if evidence of domestic violence was omitted during the original proceedings. Cooley had initially supported Peagler's release from prison, but then withdrew his written offer to reduce the battered woman's prison sentence.

Just a week before the 2008 election that he ultimately won, Cooley was attacked for violating Jessica's Law and making a deal with defense attorneys and judges to postpone seeking tougher sanctions against a group of serious sex offenders that had completed their prison terms. Rather than seeking indefinite hospitalization for some offenders, as allowed under a November 2006 ballot measure, Cooley only sought two years.

=== Third term ===
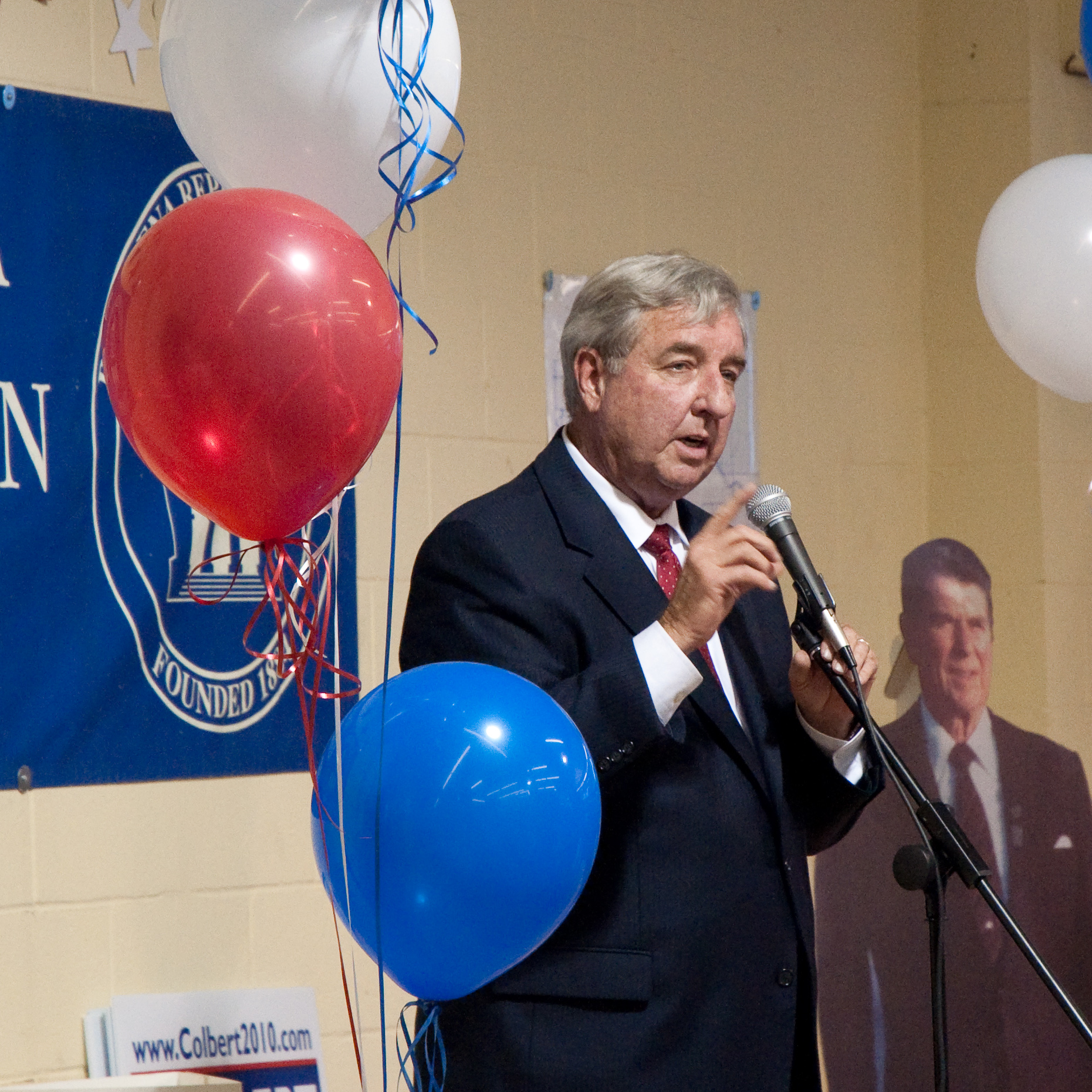
Cooley at the Grand Opening party for the Pasadena Republican Club's 2010 election headquarters.

In June 2008, Cooley was elected to a third term, defeating his challengers, Steve Ipsen, President of the L.A. County Prosecutors Union, and Albert Robles, an attorney and professor. Cooley was heavily criticized for his opposition of Proposition 9 (Marsy's Law: The Victim's Bill of Rights). Cooley told the L.A. Times, just before voters went to the polls over "Marsy's Law" that the measure, which ended up passing, would sweep aside "decades of legislative scrutiny and judicial review." It plays to voters' feelings, selling itself with a female victim's name, "like a cherry on the ice cream."

The L.A. Times editorial desk wrote on April 28, 2008, of Cooley, "It is noteworthy that he criticized predecessor Gil Garcetti in 2000 for seeking a third term and promised that he would serve only two." But in 2008, he sought a third term, despite his promise.

One of Cooley's 2008 re-election opponents, Albert Robles, faced misdemeanor charges filed against him by the D.A.'s office in November 2007. Robles was charged with printing a pair of political mailers without a return address and expending more than $100 cash in a political campaign. Robles accused Cooley of direct involvement in the charges brought against him because of a personal vendetta and to affect the outcome of the June 2008 D.A. election. Cooley denied those allegations. In October 2008, a jury found Robles not guilty of all charges after deliberating for only 20 minutes, and he was re-elected a month later to his seat on the board of the Water Replenishment District of Southern California.

Cooley was sued in federal court by the Association of Deputy District Attorneys. The suit was filed for allegedly violating the First Amendment of the United States Constitution. Judge Otis D. Wright II described District Attorney Cooley's actions as "striking and rampant". Judge Wright issued a preliminary injunction ordering Cooley to desist from behavior seen as discriminating and/or retaliating against employees on the basis of union membership.

The L.A. Times reported that "Los Angeles County Dist. Atty. Steve Cooley waged an illegal anti-union campaign in which he and his staff harassed and unfairly disciplined union officers." Thomas S. Kerrigan, an L.A. County hearing officer for the Employee Relations Commission heard months of testimony and found that veteran deputy district attorneys and prosecutors under Cooley, with outstanding evaluations, were retaliated against. Kerrigan claimed that Cooley had conducted a "deliberate and thinly disguised campaign" aimed at destroying the union. The Metropolitan News-Enterprise reported that Kerrigan exchanged emails with an ERCOM executive showing biased ex-parte communications and the removal of emails from materials provided in discovery.

In 2009, Cooley gained coverage all over the country when, along with federal authorities, he requested that the Swiss government arrest and extradite movie director Roman Polanski, who was traveling to the Zurich Film Festival. Polanski had been a fugitive for 31 years after originally fleeing the United States in February 1978 after pleading guilty to unlawful sex with a minor in Los Angeles. Swiss courts dismissed the extradition request in July 2010 and released Polanski.

Cooley, J.D. Fredricks (1903–1915) and Buron Fitts (1928–1940) are the only Los Angeles County district attorneys to serve three complete terms. Cooley did not run for a fourth term in 2012.

=== Policies ===
In 2009, Cooley declared his opposition to medicinal marijuana dispensaries that sell over-the-counter in Los Angeles County.

His administration aggressively prosecuted political corruption in the City of Los Angeles as well as such communities as Bell, Vernon, Beverly Hills, Compton, Inglewood, South Gate, Temple, and Irwindale among many others. Cooley investigated state Senator Rod Wright for living outside of his elected district, and Inglewood Mayor Roosevelt F. Dorn for a low-interest loan from the City of Inglewood. Dorn and Wright were both convicted.

== Career after public service ==
In 2012, Cooley founded Steve Cooley & Associates, a consulting firm whose website states that it "service(s) ... clients in the furtherance of their business ventures, advance(s) civil litigation and advise(s) on criminal matters". The distinction between civil and criminal litigation seems to suggest his company does not represent clients in criminal trials, despite the fact that Cooley's legal career has been in criminal prosecution.

== Representation of David Daleiden and Center for Medical Progress ==
In 2017, Cooley began to defend David Daleiden, an anti-abortion activist and founder of the Center for Medical Progress, after Daleiden and Sandra Merritt were indicted on 15 charges for surreptitiously recording several Planned Parenthood executives without their permission and claiming Planned Parenthood was illegally selling body parts from fetuses.

As part of the National Abortion Federation's lawsuit against Daleiden and the Center for Medical Progress, Federal Judge William Orrick III and the Ninth Circuit Court of Appeals issued an injunction forbidding Daleiden and CMP from publishing any more videos they had illegally obtained at private professional meetings. However, new videos then appeared on the website of Daleiden's attorney, former Los Angeles County District Attorney, Steve Cooley. Judge Orrick ordered Daleiden, and his attorneys, Cooley and Brentford J. Ferreira to appear at a June 14 hearing to consider contempt sanctions. On July 11, 2017, Judge Orrick found attorneys Cooley and Ferreira in contempt of court saying, "With respect to the criminal defense counsel, they do not get to decide whether they can violate the preliminary injunction".

On July 17, Judge Orrick found Daleiden in contempt, as well as his lawyers and the Center for Medical Progress itself. Judge Orrick ordered Daleiden to turn over video footage and other materials related to his 2016 preliminary injunction.

On August 31, Judge Orrick found Daleiden and his attorneys, Steve Cooley and Ferreira, liable for the payment of $195,359 to compensate the National Abortion Federation for legal fees and increased security for "expenses incurred as a result of the violation of my Preliminary Injunction Order". Judge Orrick wrote that Daleiden's attorneys, Cooley and Ferreira, were included in the sanctions intended to ensure "current and future compliance" with his order.

== Family ==
Cooley has been married to Jana, a former court reporter, since 1975. Their son, Michael, is a producer for Fox Sports and is married to a deputy district attorney. Their daughter, Shannon, was elected unopposed as a judge on the Los Angeles County Superior Court and began her term in 2020.

== Election history ==
Los Angeles County District Attorney primary election, 2000
Candidate	Votes	%
Steve Cooley	573,236	38.31
Gil Garcetti (incumbent)	558,066	37.3
Barry Groveman	364,902	24.39

Los Angeles County District Attorney election, 2000
Candidate	Votes	%
Steve Cooley	1,448,418	63.77
Gil Garcetti (incumbent)	822,846	36.23

Los Angeles County District Attorney primary election, 2004
Candidate	Votes	%
Steve Cooley (incumbent)	596,616	59.15
Nick Pacheco	151,360	15.01
Denise B. Moehlman	91,667	9.09
Tom Higgins	71,068	7.05
Roger Carrick	68,978	6.84
Anthony G. Patchett	28,921	2.87

Los Angeles County District Attorney primary election, 2008
Candidate	Votes	%
Steve Cooley (incumbent)	400,155	64.86
Albert Robles	120,924	19.60
Steve Ipsen	95,842	15.54

California Attorney General Republican primary, 2010
Party	Candidate	Votes	%
Republican	Steve Cooley	1,012,294	47.3
Republican	John C. Eastman	737,025	34.5
Republican	Tom Harman	391,618	18.2

California Attorney General election, 2010
Party	Candidate	Votes	%
Democratic	Kamala Harris	4,443,070	46.1
Republican	Steve Cooley	4,368,617	45.3
Green	Peter Allen	258,880	2.7
Libertarian	Timothy J. Hannan	246,584	2.6
American Independent	Diane Beall Templin	169,994	1.7
Peace and Freedom	Robert J. Evans	160,426	1.6
Total votes		9,647,571	100.00
Democratic hold			

Legal offices
Preceded by Gil Garcetti	Los Angeles County District Attorney; 2000 – 2012	Succeeded by Jackie Lacey
