= 2010 California Attorney General election =

- November 2, 2010
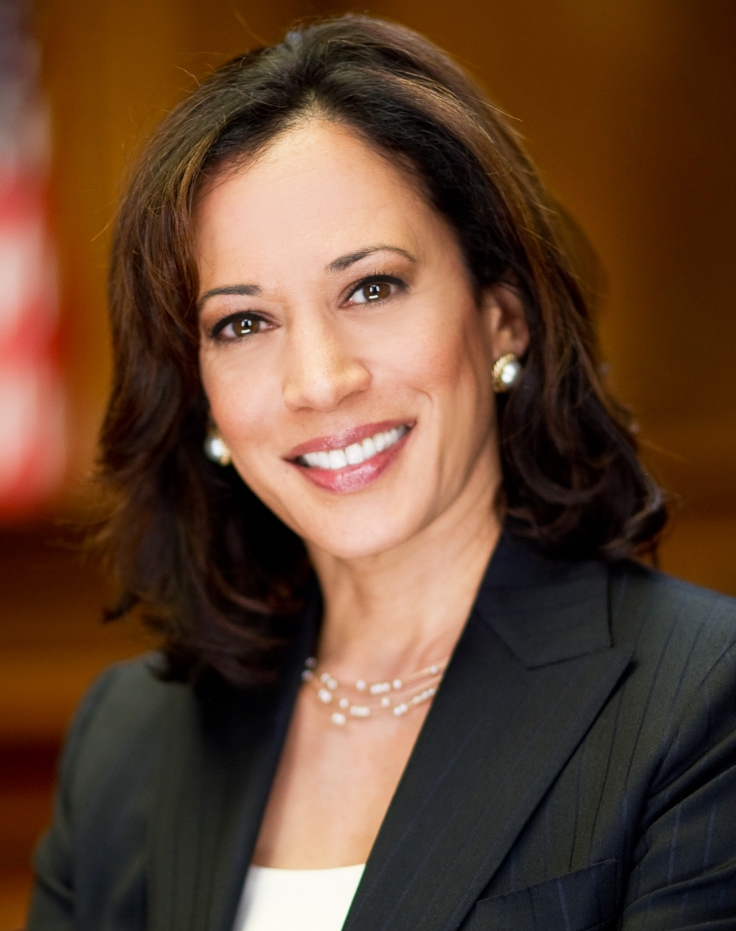

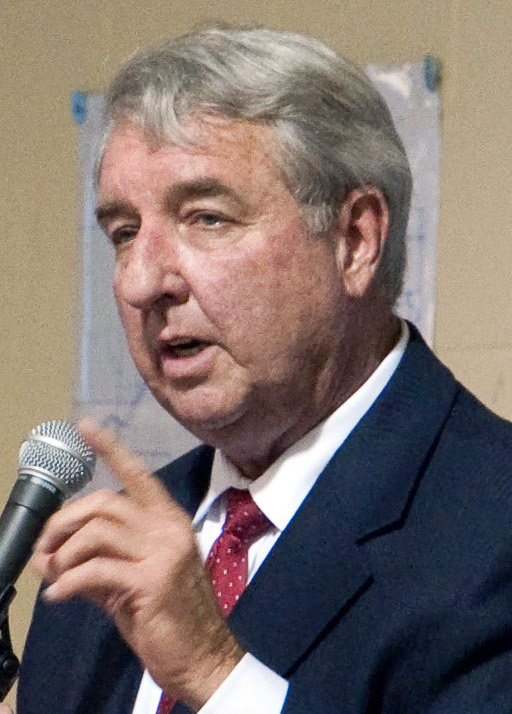
Nominee	Kamala Harris	Steve Cooley
Party	Democratic	Republican
Popular vote	4,442,781	4,368,624
Percentage	46.05%	45.28%
- Harris: 40–50% 50–60% 60–70% 70–80% Cooley: 40–50% 50–60% 60–70%
Attorney General before election
Jerry Brown
Democratic
Elected Attorney General
Kamala Harris
Democratic

The 2010 California Attorney General election was held on November 2, 2010, to choose the Attorney General of California. The primary election was held on June 8, 2010. Incumbent Attorney General Jerry Brown, a Democrat, had declined to run and instead ran successfully for governor of California.

The two major candidates were district attorneys from Los Angeles County and San Francisco, Republican Steve Cooley and Democrat Kamala Harris, respectively. On November 24, 2010, Cooley conceded to Harris, giving the Democrats a sweep of statewide executive offices. On November 30, Harris declared victory. Harris was the state's first female attorney general, and first Asian American (mother from India) state attorney general when her term began in January 2011. Harris would later be elected as a U.S. senator in 2016 and then to the vice presidency in 2020. She would go on to become the Democratic Party's presidential nominee for the 2024 election, which she would lose to former president Donald Trump.

== Campaign ==
For much of the election cycle following the primary election, political analysts theorized early on that the strength of Cooley's name after being twice elected District Attorney in Democratic-Stronghold Los Angeles County. Being viewed as a rising star in the California Republican Party, along with the strength of Meg Whitman's well-funded campaign anchoring the California Republican ticket in 2010 made Steve Cooley the initial favorite by a slight margin to win the election.

Kamala Harris coalesced Democratic support with her opposition to Proposition 8, which Cooley promised to defend in court, opposing the unpopular Proposition 23 and any proposal for an SB 1070-style law in California. Harris benefitted from an endorsement and joint appearance with President Barack Obama at a rally at the University of Southern California before election day. She also focused on promoting her candidacy in Los Angeles County towards the final weeks of the campaign, which promised to make the race competitive.

The election's only debate was held between the two major candidates on October 10, 2010, in a mock courtroom at the UC Davis School of Law. In a moment that was later dubbed by The New York Times in 2024 as "the 47 Seconds That Saved Kamala Harris's Political Career", Cooley was asked whether he planned to "double-dip" by taking the pension from his position as district attorney in addition to his $150,000 salary as California attorney general. Cooley answered that he would, saying, "I definitely earned whatever pension rights I have, and I will certainly rely upon that to supplement the very low, incredibly low salary that's paid to the attorney general." The remarks were widely considered to be tone-deaf and detrimental to Cooley's campaign, as the average annual household income in California was approximately $54,280 at the time; Cooley himself later remarked he had made a mistake by answering honestly. The Harris campaign quickly seized on the remarks with an ad depicting the question and answer, followed by text that read, "$150,000 a year isn't enough?" With the campaign running low on funds, the ads were run exclusively in Los Angeles, which was considered a stronghold for Cooley. The debate answer and subsequent ad campaign was later described as decisive both by journalists and members of both campaigns.

On election night, the headliners on the Republican ticket, Meg Whitman and Carly Fiorina, were soundly defeated by Jerry Brown and Barbara Boxer, with Democrats having a healthy margin to declare victory in every other statewide contest. Abel Maldonado, the incumbent Republican Lieutenant Governor who was defeated in his bid for election, stated that errors of the Whitman and Fiorina campaigns towards the end of the race dragged Republican candidates on the bottom of the ticket down.

The only bright spot statewide for the California Republican Party that night were early returns showing Cooley with a lead of up to eight points, in which he and many news organizations declared victory. However, the next morning, returns from Los Angeles County, which was believed to be a Cooley stronghold, came in strong for Kamala Harris, removing one of Cooley's key advantages and making the race too close to call. Cooley then canceled a victory press conference scheduled for that day.

Los Angeles and San Francisco County reported their returns, which favored Harris, and less than 38,000 votes (45.9% versus 45.7%) separated the candidates statewide at the end of counting that day.

On November 24, 2010, Cooley conceded the race when it was determined that he was going to be unable to overcome the 50,000-vote lead that Harris had built up and maintained during the past week, with a majority of the uncounted ballots coming from counties which Harris won. Having run the closest statewide race of the 2010 cycle in California, Cooley was the top vote-getter of the 2010 Republican ticket, while Harris's victory gave the Democratic Party a clean sweep of all of California's statewide offices — a feat the party had last accomplished in 2002.

== Democratic primary ==
=== Candidates ===
==== Nominee ====
- Kamala Harris, District Attorney of San Francisco (2004–2011)

==== Eliminated in primary ====
- Rocky Delgadillo, former Los Angeles City Attorney and candidate for this office in 2006
- Chris Kelly, attorney and former Facebook Chief Privacy Officer
- Ted Lieu, state assemblymember from the 53rd district (2005–2010)
- Pedro Nava, attorney and state assemblymember from the 35th district (2004–2010)
- Mike Schmier, employee rights attorney
- Alberto Torrico, former Assembly Majority Leader (2008–2010) from the 20th district (2004–2010)

=== Results ===
Democratic primary results
Party	Candidate	Votes	%
Democratic	Kamala D. Harris	762,995	33.6
Democratic	Alberto Torrico	354,792	15.6
Democratic	Chris Kelly	350,757	15.5
Democratic	Ted W. Lieu	237,618	10.5
Democratic	Pedro Nava	222,941	9.7
Democratic	Rocky Delgadillo	219,494	9.6
Democratic	Mike Schmier	127,291	5.5
Total votes		2,275,888	100.0

== Republican primary ==
=== Candidates ===
==== Nominee ====
- Steve Cooley, Los Angeles County District Attorney (2000–2012)

==== Eliminated in primary ====
- John C. Eastman, former dean of Chapman University School of Law
- Tom Harman, state senator from the 35th district (2006–2012)

=== Results ===
Republican primary results
Party	Candidate	Votes	%
Republican	Steve Cooley	1,012,294	47.3
Republican	John Eastman	737,025	34.5
Republican	Tom Harman	391,618	18.2
Total votes		2,140,937	100.0

== Minor parties ==
=== American Independent Party ===
==== Results ====
American Independent primary results
Party	Candidate	Votes	%
American Independent	Diane Beall Templin	39,103	100.0
Total votes		39,103	100.0

=== Green Party ===
- Peter Allen, attorney, former prosecutor, administrative law judge, and consumer advocate

==== Results ====
Green primary results
Party	Candidate	Votes	%
Green	Peter Allen	20,845	100.0
Total votes		20,845	100.0

=== Libertarian Party ===
- Timothy Hannan, attorney, mediator and arbitrator

==== Results ====
Libertarian primary results
Party	Candidate	Votes	%
Libertarian	Timothy J. Hannan	17,957	100.0
Total votes		17,957	100.0

=== Peace and Freedom Party ===
- Robert Evans, attorney, activist, former Recording Secretary of the Peace and Freedom Party

==== Results ====
Peace and Freedom primary results
Party	Candidate	Votes	%
Peace and Freedom	Robert Evans	3,892	100.0
Total votes		3,892	100.0

== General election ==
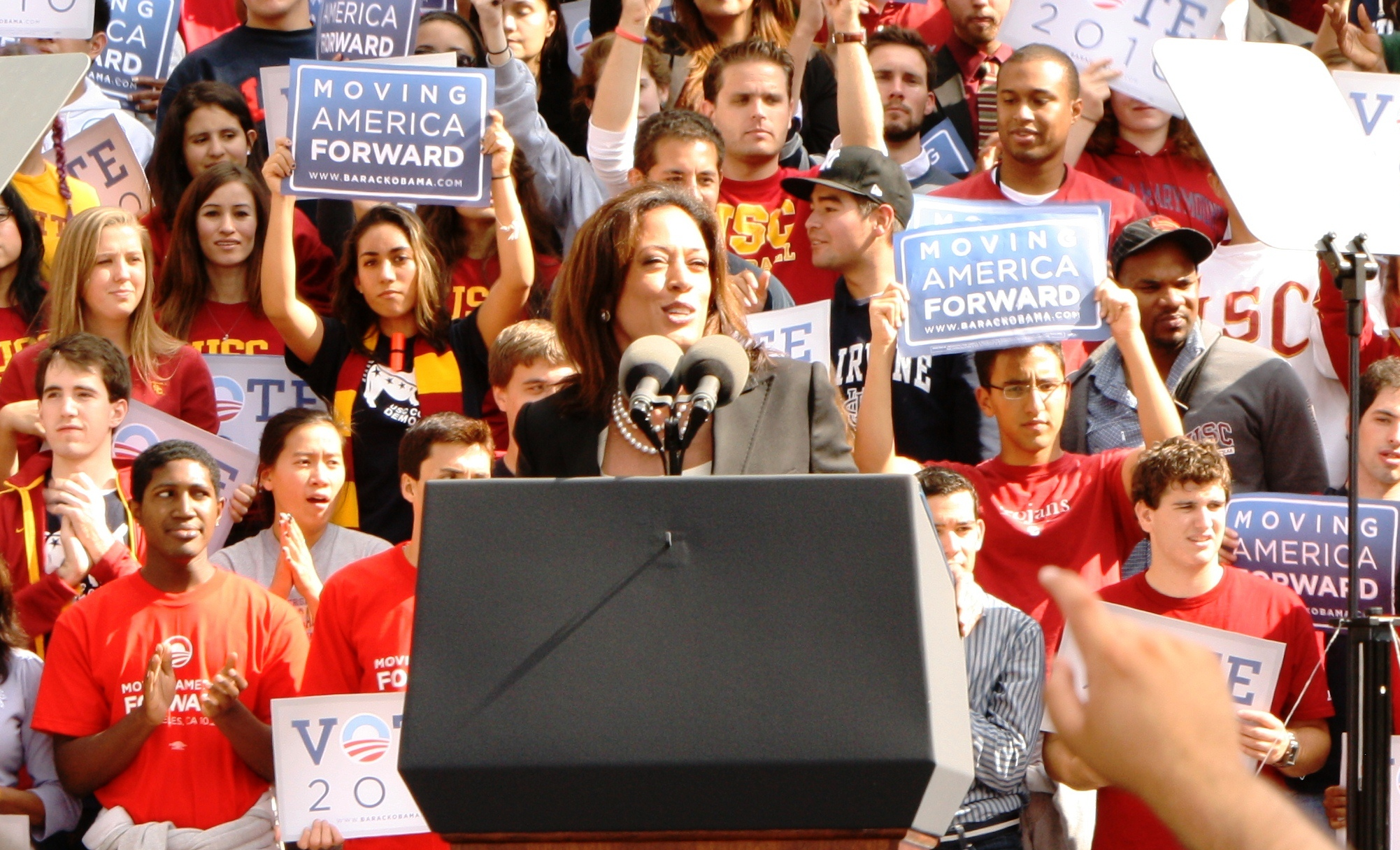
Harris speaking at a Democratic rally at USC in October 2010

=== Polling ===
Poll source	Date(s) administered	Sample size	Margin of error	Kamala Harris (D)	Steve Cooley (R)	Other	Undecided
Suffolk University	October 21–24, 2010	600	|± 4.0%	35%	34%	5% (Note: Peter Allen (G) with 2%, Diane Templin (AI), Timothy Hannan (L), and Robert Evans (PF) each with 1%)	26%
Los Angeles Times/USC	October 13–20, 2010	922	|± 3.2%	35%	40%	–	–
David Binder Research	September 23–27, 2010	800	|± 3.5%	30%	27%	11%	32%
Field Poll	September 14–21, 2010	599	|± 4.1%	31%	35%	–	34%
Field Poll	June 22 – July 5, 2010	357	|± 5.5%	34%	37%	–	29%

=== Results ===
California Attorney General election, 2010
Party	Candidate	Votes	%	±%
Democratic	Kamala Harris	4,442,781	46.05%	−10.24%
Republican	Steve Cooley	4,368,624	45.28%	+7.17%
Green	Peter Allen	258,879	2.68%	+0.37%
Libertarian	Timothy J. Hannan	246,583	2.56%	+0.46%
American Independent	Diane Beall Templin	169,993	1.76%	N/A
Peace and Freedom	Robert J. Evans	160,416	1.66%	+0.47%
Total votes		9,647,276	100.00%	N/A
Democratic hold				
