= Chris Kelly (entrepreneur) =

American entrepreneur, attorney and activist

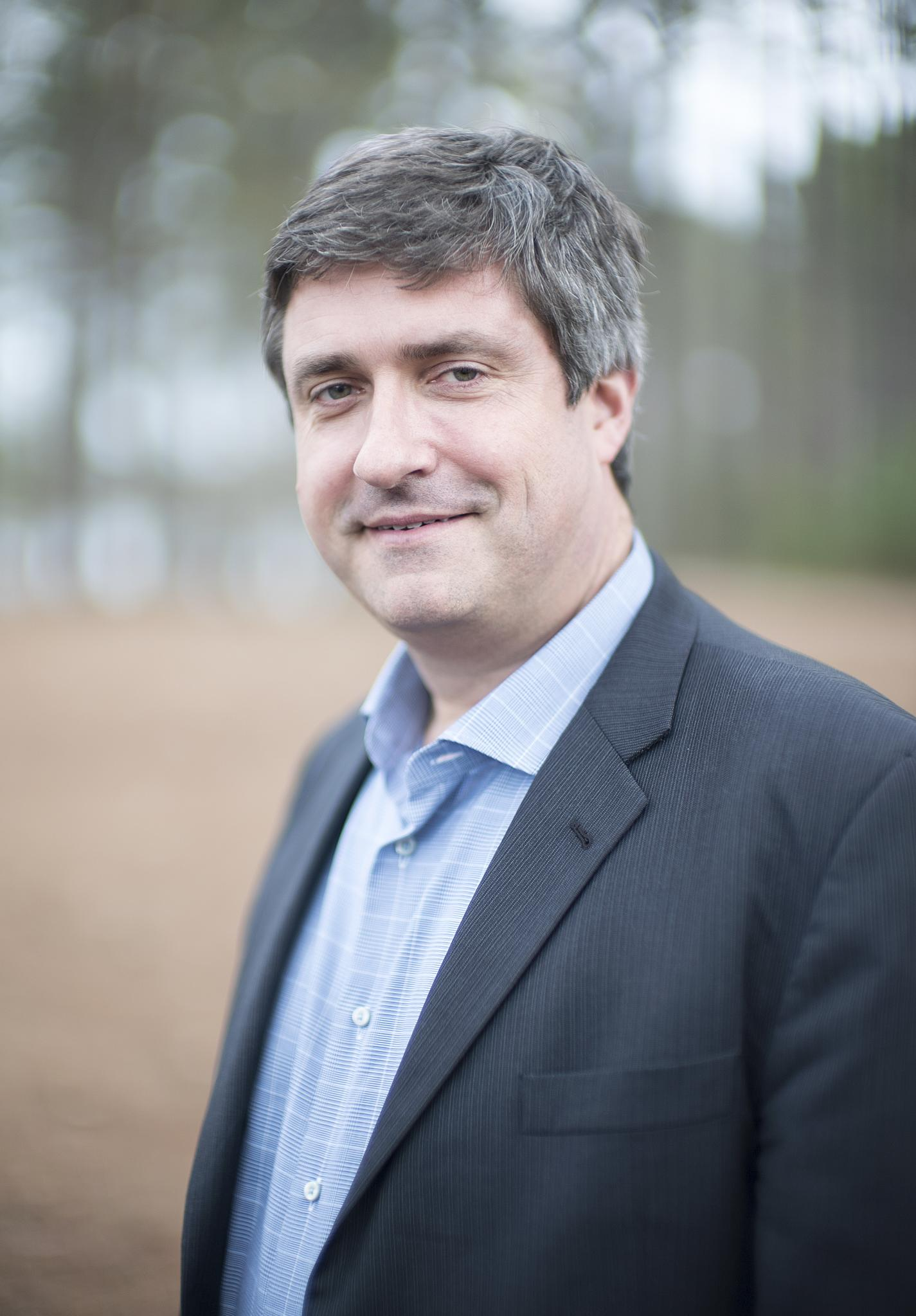
- Kelly in March 2015
- Born: August 18, 1970 (age 55)
- Education: Bellarmine College Preparatory; Georgetown University; Yale University; Harvard Law School
- Occupations: entrepreneur, politician, lawyer
- Known for: former Chief Privacy Officer of Facebook
- Political party: Democratic
- Spouse: Jennifer Carrico
- Children: 2

Christopher Michael Kelly (born August 18, 1970) is an American entrepreneur, attorney, and activist. From September 2005 to August 2009, he served as Chief Privacy Officer, first General Counsel, and Head of Global Public Policy at Facebook. As an early leader at Facebook, he helped shape it into one of the most successful businesses in history. In 2010, Kelly was a candidate in the Democratic primary for California Attorney General. Since his departure from Facebook and campaign for Attorney General, he has become an investor in films, restaurants, and technology start-ups. Kelly became a co-owner of the NBA's Sacramento Kings in May 2013.

== Early life and education ==
Kelly spent his early years in Santa Ana and San Jose, California, where he graduated from Bellarmine College Preparatory in 1987. He earned a BA from Georgetown University in 1991, a master's degree in political theory from Yale University in 1992, and a J.D. degree from Harvard Law School in 1997.

== Law and public policy career ==
After graduating from Georgetown and during his time at Yale, Kelly joined the staff of Bill Clinton's first presidential campaign. He went on to be appointed a policy advisor for the United States Domestic Policy Council and Department of Education during the Clinton Administration. Kelly helped advance critical domestic programs, including the successful initiative to put 100,000 new community police officers on America's streets, and the formation of AmeriCorps, a network of national service programs that engage Americans to improve education, public safety, health, and the environment.

Following his time at Harvard Law, Kelly clerked for federal judge Barry Moskowitz, and subsequently entered private practice with the firms Wilson Sonsini Goodrich & Rosati and Baker & McKenzie. During that time, he represented Netscape in the Microsoft antitrust case, and Diamond Multimedia in its groundbreaking suit over the first MP3 player. The court's decision resulted in expanded personal use rights over digital content. Kelly left the firm to become Silicon Valley's first "chief privacy officer", holding the position at Kendara, Excite@Home, and Spoke Software prior to joining Facebook in September 2005.

== Facebook ==
Joining Facebook as the fledgling company's first attorney, Kelly would serve as Chief Privacy Officer, General Counsel, Head of Global Public Policy, and Vice President of Corporate Development.

Kelly's development of the site's safety and security policies around real world identity and deployment of a highly trained staff for rule and law enforcement are credited as critical elements in the company's success. At Facebook, Kelly worked with Attorneys General in all 50 states to develop safeguards protecting children from sexual predators and represented the company in complex situations involving privacy and intellectual property in the digital age.

== Attorney General electoral bid ==
On April 20, 2009, Kelly announced his candidacy for the Democratic nomination for the office of the Attorney General of California The only non-elected officeholder in the field, Kelly garnered 16 percent of the vote in his first run for public office, finishing third in a crowded field of Democratic contenders.

== Career as an investor ==
Kelly has been an active angel investor in companies seeking transformational improvements in technology, media, and finance, as well as in independent film and restaurants. In 2010, Kelly launched Kelly Investments, a personal investment fund. Kelly has been a producer on multiple independent films, including Olive, The Power of Two, Once Upon a Time in Queens, and the award-winning documentary, Jiro Dreams of Sushi.

Kelly was a key player in bringing Bradley's Fine Dine to Menlo Park in 2014, though the restaurant was shuttered as of January 1, 2017.

== Political activism and philanthropy ==
Alongside Daphne Phung of California Against Slavery, Kelly was a primary proponent of the California Proposition 35 Ballot Initiative in 2012, which modernized California's laws against human trafficking and sex slavery. The initiative increased prison terms for human traffickers, requires convicted sex traffickers to register as sex offenders, requires criminal fines from convicted human traffickers to pay for services to help victims, requires all registered sex offenders to disclose their internet accounts and mandates law enforcement training on human trafficking. The initiative garnered 81% support from the voters in California, making it the most successful ballot initiative in the history of California.

Kelly has done extensive work with the California Peace Officers’ Memorial Foundation, a non-profit organization whose mission is to recognize and honor California's peace officers who their lives “In The Line of Duty” serving citizens of the state of California and provides support to family members left behind. Kelly has been a strong supporter of veteran's causes, victims rights and educational programs surrounding California's criminal justice system.

Additionally, Kelly sits on numerous boards of national philanthropic and policy organizations, including:

- Board of Regents, Georgetown University
- National Board Chairman, New Leaders Council
- Board of Trustees, Progressive Policy Institute
- Board of Directors, San Francisco 49ers Academy
- Board of Directors, OSET Foundation
- Board of Directors, The Redford Center

== Personal life ==
Kelly resides in Palo Alto, California with his wife Jennifer Carrico, an entrepreneur and former prosecutor, and their children.
