= Alberto Torrico =

American politician

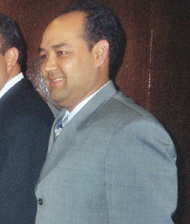
- Alberto Torrico

Member of the California Unemployment Insurance Appeals Board
- In office May 13, 2008 – March 18, 2010
- Nominated by: John Pérez

Majority Leader of the California Assembly
- In office May 13, 2008 - March 18, 2010
- Preceded by: Karen Bass
- Succeeded by: Charles Calderon

Member of the California State Assembly from the 20th district
- In office December 6, 2004 – December 6, 2010
- Preceded by: John Dutra
- Succeeded by: Bob Wieckowski

Personal details
- Born: March 18, 1969 (age 57) San Francisco, California
- Party: Democratic
- Spouse: Raquel Andrade-Torrico
- Children: 2

Alberto Torrico (born March 18, 1969) is an American politician who was elected to the California State Assembly in 2004. A member of the Democratic Party, he served for six years, including for two years as Majority Leader.

During his three terms in Sacramento, Alberto served as Chair of the Public Employee Retirement and Social Security Committee, charged with oversight of the pension funds, CALPERS and CALSTRS. He also chaired the Governmental Organization Committee.

In the California Democratic primary of 2010, Alberto ran unsuccessfully for Attorney General.

After being termed out of office, Torrico was appointed to the California Unemployment Insurance Appeals Board in January 2011. Prior to his legislative tenure, Alberto served as a council member for three years in the East Bay community of Newark.

== Early life and education ==
Torrico's parents immigrated from Bolivia. His mother has Japanese descent.

Torrico attended Irvington High School in Fremont, California. Torrico earned his Bachelor of Science degree in political science from Santa Clara University. He went on to earn a J.D. from University of California, Hastings College of Law.

== Legal career ==
Torrico was admitted to the California State Bar in 1996. His career began as a policy aide for Santa Clara County Supervisor Ron Gonzales. He specialized in labor law at Weinberg, Roger & Rosenfield in Oakland and Los Angeles, taught labor and employment law at San Jose City College, and served as senior assistant counsel at the Santa Clara Valley Transportation Authority in San Jose. In 2001, he opened a private law practice in Fremont.

== Public service ==
=== Newark City Council ===
Torrico was elected to the Newark City Council in 2001 and later served as Vice-Mayor of Newark.

=== California State Assembly ===
Torrico was elected to the California state Assembly in 2004 to succeed termed-out John Dutra. In his second term Torrico was appointed Chair of the Governmental Organization Committee. Torrico was later named Director for Majority Affairs.
