= Electoral history of Newt Gingrich =

Elections featuring US House Speaker

This is the electoral history of Newt Gingrich. Gingrich, a Republican, served as the 50th Speaker of the United States House of Representatives from 1995 until his resignation in November 1998. He represented Georgia's 6th congressional district as a Republican from 1979 until his resignation in January 1999. In 2012, Gingrich was a candidate for the Republican Party presidential nomination.

== Georgia's 6th congressional district ==
=== 1974 election ===
1974 Georgia's 6th congressional district election * denotes incumbent Source:
Party	Candidate	Votes	%
Democratic	Jack Flynt*	49,082	51.45
Republican	Newt Gingrich	46,308	48.55
Total votes		95,390	100.00

=== 1976 election ===
1976 Georgia's 6th congressional district election * denotes incumbent Source:
Party	Candidate	Votes	%
Democratic	Jack Flynt*	77,532	51.71
Republican	Newt Gingrich	72,400	48.29
Total votes		149,932	100.00

=== 1978 election ===
1978 Georgia's 6th congressional district Republican primary election Source:
Party	Candidate	Votes	%
Republican	Newt Gingrich	4,597	75.56
Republican	David Barrow	952	15.65
Republican	Michael W. "Mike" Esther	535	8.79
Total votes		6,084	100.00

1978 Georgia's 6th congressional district election Source:
Party	Candidate	Votes	%
Republican	Newt Gingrich	47,078	54.40
Democratic	Virginia Shapard	39,451	45.59
Total votes		86,529	100.00

=== 1980 election ===
1980 Georgia's 6th congressional district election * denotes incumbent Source:
Party	Candidate	Votes	%
Republican	Newt Gingrich*	96,071	59.05
Democratic	Dock H. Davis	66,606	40.94
Total votes		149,932	100.00

=== 1982 election ===
1982 Georgia's 6th congressional district election * denotes incumbent Source:
Party	Candidate	Votes	%
Republican	Newt Gingrich*	62,352	55.27
Democratic	Jim Wood	50,459	44.73
Total votes		112,812	100.00

=== 1984 election ===
1984 Georgia's 6th congressional district election * denotes incumbent Source:
Party	Candidate	Votes	%
Republican	Newt Gingrich*	116,655	69.14
Democratic	Gerald L. Johnson	52,061	30.86
Total votes		168,717	100.00

=== 1986 election ===
1986 Georgia's 6th congressional district election * denotes incumbent Source:
Party	Candidate	Votes	%
Republican	Newt Gingrich*	75,583	59.55
Democratic	Candle Bray	51,352	40.46
Total votes		126,935	100.00

=== 1988 election ===
1988 Georgia's 6th congressional district election * denotes incumbent Source:
Party	Candidate	Votes	%
Republican	Newt Gingrich*	110,169	58.92
Democratic	David Worley	76,824	41.08
Total votes		186,993	100.00

=== 1990 election ===
1990 Georgia's 6th congressional district election * denotes incumbent Source:
Party	Candidate	Votes	%
Republican	Newt Gingrich*	78,768	50.31
Democratic	David Worley	77,794	49.69
Total votes		156,562	100.00

=== 1992 election ===
1992 Georgia's 6th congressional district election * denotes incumbent Source:
Party	Candidate	Votes	%
Republican	Newt Gingrich*	158,761	57.74
Democratic	Tony Center	116,196	42.26
Total votes		274,957	100.00

=== 1994 election ===
1994 Georgia's 6th congressional district election * denotes incumbent Source:
Party	Candidate	Votes	%
Republican	Newt Gingrich*	119,432	64.17
Democratic	Ben Jones	66,700	35.83
Total votes		186,132	100.00

=== 1996 election ===
1996 Georgia's 6th congressional district election * denotes incumbent Source:
Party	Candidate	Votes	%
Republican	Newt Gingrich*	174,155	57.80
Democratic	Michael Coles	127,135	42.20
Total votes		301,290	100.00

=== 1998 election ===
1998 Georgia's 6th congressional district election * denotes incumbent Source:
Party	Candidate	Votes	%
Republican	Newt Gingrich*	164,966	70.70
Democratic	Bats Pelphrey	68,366	29.30
Total votes		233,332	100.00

== Speaker of the House of Representatives ==
=== 1995 election ===
1995 election for speaker – 104th Congress
Party	Candidate	Votes	%
Republican	Newt Gingrich (GA 6)	228	52.54
Democratic	Dick Gephardt (MO 3)	202	46.55
—	Present	4	0.91
Total votes		434	100
Votes necessary		218	>50

=== 1997 election ===
1997 election for speaker – 105th Congress * denotes incumbent
Party	Candidate	Votes	%
Republican	Newt Gingrich (GA 6)*	216 (Note: Received a majority of the votes cast, and thus won the election, but failed to obtain a majority of the full membership (218).)	50.83
Democratic	Dick Gephardt (MO 3)	205	48.24
Republican	Jim Leach (IA 1)	2	0.47
Republican	Robert Michel (Note: Not a member of the House at the time, retired.)	1	0.23
Republican	Robert Walker	1	0.23
Total votes		425 (Note: Six Republicans answered "present" during the roll call vote. These were not included in the vote count, only "votes cast for a person by name" were.)	100
Votes necessary		213	>50

== United States President ==
=== 2012 ===
First place by first-instance vote Mitt Romney (42) Rick Santorum (11) Newt Gingrich (2) Ron Paul (1)

2012 Republican Party presidential primaries
Party	Candidate	Votes	%
Republican	Mitt Romney	9,685,780	51.50%
Republican	Rick Santorum	3,909,621	20.79%
Republican	Newt Gingrich	2,718,937	14.46%
Republican	Ron Paul	2,049,410	10.90%
Republican	Jon Huntsman Jr.	84,730	0.45%
Republican	Rick Perry	54,769	0.29%
Republican	Michele Bachmann	41,429	0.22%
Total votes		18,544,676	100.00%

== See also ==
- Electoral history of Al Gore
- Electoral history of Barack Obama
- Electoral history of Kamala Harris
- Electoral history of Bill Clinton
- Electoral history of Kevin McCarthy
- Electoral history of Mike Johnson
- Electoral history of Mitt Romney
- Electoral history of Nancy Pelosi
- Electoral history of Paul Ryan
- Electoral history of Ron Paul
