= Electoral history of Nancy Pelosi =

The electoral history of Nancy Pelosi spans more than three decades, from the mid-1980s to the present. A member of the Democratic Party in the United States, Pelosi was first elected to the U.S. House of Representatives in a 1987 special election, after the death of Congresswoman Sala Burton that February. In the Democratic primary, Pelosi defeated San Francisco Supervisor Harry Britt, considered the more progressive candidate, with 36 percent of the vote to his 32 percent. In the subsequent run-off, she defeated Republican Harriet Ross, her closest competitor, by more than a 2–1 margin.

Now in her 18th two-year term, Pelosi has enjoyed overwhelming voter support throughout her congressional career. Since 2013, she has represented California's 12th congressional district, which consists of four-fifths of the city and county of San Francisco. She initially represented the 5th district (1987–1993), and then, when district boundaries were redrawn after the 1990 Census, the 8th district (1993–2013). Despite re-districting, her support never wavered and she continued to win her elections by large margins. served as the House Democratic Party leader from 2003 to 2023, and sought election to the office of Speaker of the United States House of Representatives every two years during that time, of which four campaigns were successful. In 2007 Pelosi became the first woman, first Italian American, and first Californian to ever serve as the speaker of the house. Prior to the 2020 election in which Kamala Harris was elected vice president, Pelosi was the highest ranking female in American Political History.

== U.S. House of Representatives ==
=== 1987 special election ===
California's 5th congressional district special election, 1987
Party	Candidate	Votes	%
Democratic	Nancy Pelosi	38,927	36.1
Democratic	Harry Britt	35,008	32.5
Democratic	William Maher	15,355	14.2
Democratic	Doris M. Ward	6,498	6.0
Republican	Harriet Ross	3,016	2.8
Democratic	Carol Ruth Silver	2,896	2.7
Republican	Jeff Smith	1,755	1.6
Republican	Tom Spinosa	1,712	1.6
Republican	Mike Garza	1,262	1.2
independent (politician)	Karen Edwards	447	0.4
Libertarian	Sam Grove	408	0.4
Peace and Freedom	Theodore "Ted" Zuur	187	0.2
independent (politician)	Catherine P. Sedwick	164	0.2
Democratic	Brian Lantz	141	0.1
Total votes		107,776	100
Runoff election
Democratic	Nancy Pelosi	46,428	63.3
Republican	Harriet Ross	22,478	30.7
independent (politician)	Karen Edwards	1,602	2.2
Peace and Freedom	Theodore "Ted" Zuur	1,105	1.5
Libertarian	Sam Grove	1,007	1.4
independent (politician)	Catherine P. Sedwick	659	0.9
Total votes		73,279	100

=== 1988 election ===
California's 5th congressional district election, 1988 * denotes incumbent Source:
Party	Candidate	Votes	%
Democratic	Nancy Pelosi*	133,530	76.4
Republican	Bruce Michael O'Neill	33,692	19.3
Peace and Freedom	Theodore "Ted" Zuur	3,975	2.3
Libertarian	Sam Grove	3,561	2.0
Total votes		174,758	100

=== 1990 election ===
California's 5th congressional district election, 1990 * denotes incumbent Source:
Party	Candidate	Votes	%
Democratic	Nancy Pelosi*	120,633	77.2
Republican	Alan Nichols	35,671	22.8
Total votes		156,304	100

=== 1992 election ===
California's 8th congressional district election, 1992 * denotes incumbent Source:
Party	Candidate	Votes	%
Democratic	Nancy Pelosi*	191,906	82.5
Republican	Marc Wolin	25,693	11.0
Peace and Freedom	Cesar G. Cadabes	7,572	3.3
Libertarian	James R. Elwood	7,511	3.2
No party	(write-in)	9	0.0
Total votes		232,691	100

=== 1994 election ===
California's 8th congressional district election, 1994 primary * denotes incumbent Source:
Party	Candidate	Votes	%
Democratic	Nancy Pelosi*	66,247	92.4
Democratic	Robert Ingraham	5,476	7.6
Total votes		71,723	100

California's 8th congressional district election, 1994 * denotes incumbent Source:
Party	Candidate	Votes	%
Democratic	Nancy Pelosi*	137,642	81.8
Republican	Elsa C. Cheung	30,528	18.2
No party	(write-in)	1	0.0
Total votes		168,171	100

=== 1996 election ===
California's 8th congressional district election, 1996 * denotes incumbent Source:
Party	Candidate	Votes	%
Democratic	Nancy Pelosi*	175,216	84.3
Republican	Justin Raimondo	25,739	12.4
Natural Law	David Smithstein	6,783	3.3
Total votes		207,738	100

=== 1998 election ===
California's 8th congressional district election, 1998 * denotes incumbent Source:
Party	Candidate	Votes	%
Democratic	Nancy Pelosi*	148,027	85.8
Republican	David J. Martz	20,781	12.1
Natural Law	David Smithstein	3,654	2.1
Total votes		172,462	100

=== 2000 election ===
California's 8th congressional district election, 2000 * denotes incumbent Source:
Party	Candidate	Votes	%
Democratic	Nancy Pelosi*	181,847	84.5
Republican	Adam Sparks	25,298	11.7
Libertarian	Erik Bauman	5,645	2.6
Natural Law	David Smithstein	2,638	1.2
Total votes		215,428	100

=== 2002 election ===
California's 8th congressional district election, 2002 primary * denotes incumbent Source:
Party	Candidate	Votes	%
Democratic	Nancy Pelosi*	65,949	93.1
Democratic	Robert Ingraham	4,898	6.9
Total votes		70,847	100

California's 8th congressional district election, 2002 * denotes incumbent Source:
Party	Candidate	Votes	%
Democratic	Nancy Pelosi*	127,684	79.6
Republican	G. Michael German	20,063	12.6
Green	Jay Pond	10,033	6.2
Libertarian	Ira Spivack	2,659	1.6
independent (politician)	Deborah Liatos	2	0.0
Total votes		160,441	100

=== 2004 election ===
California's 8th congressional district election, 2004 * denotes incumbent Source:
Party	Candidate	Votes	%
Democratic	Nancy Pelosi*	224,017	83.0
Republican	Jennifer Depalma	31,074	11.5
Peace and Freedom	Leilani Dowell	9,527	3.5
independent (politician)	Terry Baum	5,446	2.0
Total votes		270,064	100

=== 2006 election ===
California's 8th congressional district election, 2006 * denotes incumbent Source:
Party	Candidate	Votes	%
Democratic	Nancy Pelosi*	148,435	80.4
Republican	Mike DeNunzio	19,800	10.8
Green	Krissy Keefer	13,653	7.4
Libertarian	Philip Zimt Berg	2,751	1.4
Total votes		184,639	100

=== 2008 election ===
California's 8th congressional district election, 2008 primary * denotes incumbent Source:
Party	Candidate	Votes	%
Democratic	Nancy Pelosi*	83,510	89.2
Democratic	Shirley Golub	10,105	10.8
Total votes		93,615	100

California's 8th congressional district election, 2008 * denotes incumbent Source:
Party	Candidate	Votes	%
Democratic	Nancy Pelosi*	204,996	71.9
independent (politician)	Cindy Sheehan	46,118	16.2
Republican	Dana Walsh	27,614	9.7
Libertarian	Philip Z. Berg	6,504	2.2
independent (politician)	Lea Sherman	11	0.0
independent (politician)	Michelle Wong Clay	4	0.0
Total votes		285,247	100

=== 2010 election ===
California's 8th congressional district election, 2010 * denotes incumbent Source:
Party	Candidate	Votes	%
Democratic	Nancy Pelosi*	167,957	80.1
Republican	John Dennis	31,711	15.2
Peace and Freedom	Gloria La Riva	5,161	2.4
Libertarian	Philip Zimt Berg	4,843	2.3
Total votes		209,672	100

=== 2012 election ===
California's 12th congressional district election, 2012 * denotes incumbent Source:
Primary election
Party	Candidate	Votes	%
Democratic	Nancy Pelosi*	89,446	74.9
Republican	John Dennis	16,206	13.6
Green	Barry Hermanson	6,398	5.4
Democratic	David Peterson	3,756	3.1
Democratic	Summer Shields	2,146	1.8
Democratic	Americo Arturo Diaz	1,499	1.3
Total votes		119,451	100
General election
Democratic	Nancy Pelosi*	253,709	85.1
Republican	John Dennis	44,478	14.9
Total votes		298,181	100

=== 2014 election ===
California's 12th congressional district election, 2014 * denotes incumbent Source:
Primary election
Party	Candidate	Votes	%
Democratic	Nancy Pelosi*	79,816	73.6
Republican	John Dennis	12,922	11.9
Green	Barry Hermanson	6,156	5.7
Democratic	David Peterson	3,774	3.5
Peace and Freedom	Frank Lara	2,107	1.9
Democratic	Michael Steger	1,514	1.4
No party preference	A. J. "Desmond" Thorsson	1,270	1.2
No party preference	James Welles	879	0.8
Total votes		108,438	100.0
General election
Democratic	Nancy Pelosi*	160,067	83.3
Republican	John Dennis	32,197	16.7
Total votes		192,264	100.0

=== 2016 election ===
California's 12th congressional district election, 2016 * denotes incumbent Source:
Primary election
Party	Candidate	Votes	%
Democratic	Nancy Pelosi*	169,537	78.1
No party preference	Preston Picus	16,633	7.7
Republican	Bob Miller	16,583	7.6
Green	Barry Hermanson	14,289	6.6
Total votes		217,042	100.0
General election
Democratic	Nancy Pelosi*	274,035	80.9
No party preference	Preston Picus	64,810	19.1
Total votes		338,845	100.0

=== 2018 election ===
California's 12th congressional district election, 2018 * denotes incumbent Source:
Primary election
Party	Candidate	Votes	%
Democratic	Nancy Pelosi*	141,365	68.5
Republican	Lisa Remmer	18,771	9.1
Democratic	Shahid Buttar	17,597	8.5
Democratic	Stephen Jaffe	12,114	5.9
Democratic	Ryan A. Khojasteh	9,498	4.6
Green	Barry Hermanson	4,217	2.0
No party preference	Michael Goldstein	2,820	1.4
Total votes		206,382	100.0
General election
Democratic	Nancy Pelosi*	275,292	86.8
Republican	Lisa Remmer	41,780	13.2
Total votes		317,072	100.0

=== 2020 election ===
California's 12th congressional district election, 2020 * denotes incumbent Source:
Primary election
Party	Candidate	Votes	%
Democratic	Nancy Pelosi*	89,460	72.5
Democratic	Shahid Buttar	15,645	12.7
Republican	John Dennis	11,387	9.2
Republican	Deanna Lorraine	2,653	2.1
Democratic	Tom Gallagher	2,598	2.1
Democratic	Agatha Bacelar	1,679	1.4
Total votes		123,422	100
General election
Democratic	Nancy Pelosi*	281,776	77.6
Democratic	Shahid Buttar	81,174	22.4
Total votes		362,950	100

=== 2022 election ===
California's 11th congressional district, 2022
Primary election
Party	Candidate	Votes	%
Democratic	Nancy Pelosi (incumbent)	133,798	71.7
Republican	John Dennis	20,054	10.7
Democratic	Shahid Buttar	19,471	10.4
Republican	Eve Del Castello	7,319	3.9
Democratic	Jeffrey Phillips	3,595	1.9
Democratic	Bianca Von Krieg	2,499	1.3
Total votes		186,736	100.0
General election
Democratic	Nancy Pelosi (incumbent)	220,848	84.0
Republican	John Dennis	42,217	16.0
Total votes		263,065	100.0

=== 2024 election ===
Primary results by precinct: Pelosi—40–50% Pelosi—50–60% Pelosi—60–70% Pelosi—70–80% Pelosi—80–90% No Data

California's 11th congressional district, 2024
Primary election
Party	Candidate	Votes	%
Democratic	Nancy Pelosi (incumbent)	138,285	73.3
Republican	Bruce Lou	16,285	8.6
Democratic	Marjorie Mikels	9,363	5.0
Democratic	Bianca Von Krieg	7,634	4.0
Republican	Jason Zeng	6,607	3.5
Democratic	Jason Boyce	4,325	2.3
Republican	Larry Nichelson	3,482	1.8
Republican	Eve Del Castello	2,751	1.5
Total votes		188,732	100.0
General election
Democratic	Nancy Pelosi (incumbent)	274,796	81.0
Republican	Bruce Lou	64,315	19.0
Total votes		339,111	100.0

== Speaker of the House ==
=== 2003 election ===
2003 election for Speaker – 108th Congress * denotes incumbent
Party	Candidate	Votes	%
Republican	Dennis Hastert* (IL 14)	228	52.53
Democratic	Nancy Pelosi (CA 8)	201	46.31
Democratic	John Murtha (PA 12)	1	0.23
—	Present	4	0.93
Total votes		434	100
Votes necessary		218	>50

=== 2005 election ===
2005 election for Speaker – 109th Congress * denotes incumbent
Party	Candidate	Votes	%
Republican	Dennis Hastert* (IL 14)	226	52.92
Democratic	Nancy Pelosi (CA 8)	199	46.60
Democratic	John Murtha (PA 12)	1	0.24
—	Present	1	0.24
Total votes		427	100
Votes necessary		214	>50

=== 2007 election ===
2007 election for Speaker – 110th Congress
Party	Candidate	Votes	%
Democratic	Nancy Pelosi (CA 8)	233	53.56
Republican	John Boehner (OH 8)	202	46.44
Total votes		435	100
Votes necessary		218	>50

=== 2009 election ===
2009 election for Speaker – 111th Congress * denotes incumbent
Party	Candidate	Votes	%
Democratic	Nancy Pelosi* (CA 8)	255	59.44
Republican	John Boehner (OH 8)	174	40.56
Total votes		429	100
Votes necessary		215	>50

=== 2011 election ===
2011 election for Speaker – 112th Congress * denotes incumbent
Party	Candidate	Votes	%
Republican	John Boehner (OH 8)	241	55.88
Democratic	Nancy Pelosi* (CA 8)	173	39.96
Democratic	Heath Shuler (NC 11)	11	2.53
Democratic	John Lewis (GA 5)	2	0.48
Democratic	Dennis Cardoza (CA 18)	1	0.23
Democratic	Jim Costa (CA 20)	1	0.23
Democratic	Jim Cooper (TN 5)	1	0.23
Democratic	Steny Hoyer (MD 5)	1	0.23
Democratic	Marcy Kaptur (OH 9)	1	0.23
Total votes		432	100
Votes necessary		217	>50

=== 2013 election ===
2013 election for Speaker – 113th Congress * denotes incumbent
Party	Candidate	Votes	%
Republican	John Boehner* (OH 8)	220	51.64
Democratic	Nancy Pelosi (CA 12)	192	45.04
Republican	Eric Cantor (VA 7)	3	0.70
Democratic	Jim Cooper (TN 5)	2	0.47
Republican	Allen West (Note: Not a member of the House at the time.)	2	0.47
Republican	Justin Amash (MI 3)	1	0.24
Democratic	John Dingell (MI 12)	1	0.24
Republican	Jim Jordan (OH 4)	1	0.24
Republican	Raúl Labrador (ID 1)	1	0.24
Democratic	John Lewis (GA 5)	1	0.24
Republican	Colin Powell	1	0.24
Republican	David Walker	1	0.24
Total votes		426	100
Votes necessary		214	>50

=== 2015 regular election ===
2015 election for Speaker (Regular) – 114th Congress * denotes incumbent
Party	Candidate	Votes	%
Republican	John Boehner* (OH 8)	216 (Note: Received a majority of the votes cast, and thus won the election, but failed to obtain a majority of the full membership (218).)	52.95
Democratic	Nancy Pelosi (CA 12)	164	40.20
Republican	Dan Webster (FL 10)	12	2.95
Republican	Louie Gohmert (TX 1)	3	0.74
Republican	Ted Yoho (FL 3)	2	2.50
Republican	Jim Jordan (OH 4)	2	0.50
Republican	Jeff Duncan (SC 3)	1	0.24
Republican	Rand Paul	1	0.24
Republican	Colin Powell	1	0.24
Republican	Trey Gowdy (SC 4)	1	0.24
Republican	Kevin McCarthy (CA 23)	1	0.24
Democratic	Jim Cooper (TN 5)	1	0.24
Democratic	Peter DeFazio (OR 4)	1	0.24
Republican	Jeff Sessions	1	0.24
Democratic	John Lewis (GA 5)	1	0.24
Total votes		408	100
Votes necessary		205	>50

=== 2015 special election ===
2015 election for Speaker (Special) – 114th Congress
Party	Candidate	Votes	%
Republican	Paul Ryan (WI 1)	236	54.63
Democratic	Nancy Pelosi (CA 12)	184	42.60
Republican	Dan Webster (FL 10)	9	2.08
Democratic	Jim Cooper (TN 5)	1	0.23
Democratic	John Lewis (GA 5)	1	0.23
Republican	Colin Powell	1	0.23
Total votes		432	100
Votes necessary		217	>50

=== 2017 election ===
2017 election for Speaker – 115th Congress * denotes incumbent
Party	Candidate	Votes	%
Republican	Paul Ryan* (WI 1)	239	55.19
Democratic	Nancy Pelosi (CA 12)	189	43.65
Democratic	Tim Ryan (OH 13)	2	0.47
Democratic	Jim Cooper (TN 5)	1	0.23
Democratic	John Lewis (GA 5)	1	0.23
Republican	Dan Webster (FL 10)	1	0.23
Total votes		433	100
Votes necessary		217	>50

=== 2019 election ===
2019 election for Speaker – 116th Congress
Party	Candidate	Votes	%
Democratic	Nancy Pelosi (CA 12)	220	51.17
Republican	Kevin McCarthy (CA 23)	192	44.66
Republican	Jim Jordan (OH 4)	5	1.16
Democratic	Cheri Bustos (IL 17)	4	0.93
Democratic	Tammy Duckworth	2	0.47
Democratic	Stacey Abrams	1	0.23
Democratic	Joe Biden	1	0.23
Democratic	Marcia Fudge (OH 11)	1	0.23
Democratic	Joe Kennedy III (MA 4)	1	0.23
Democratic	John Lewis (GA 5)	1	0.23
Republican	Thomas Massie (KY 4)	1	0.23
Democratic	Stephanie Murphy (FL 7)	1	0.23
Total votes		430	100
Votes necessary		216	>50

=== 2021 election ===
2021 election for Speaker – 117th Congress * denotes incumbent
Party	Candidate	Votes	%
Democratic	Nancy Pelosi* (CA 12)	216	50.2%
Republican	Kevin McCarthy (CA 23)	209	48.6%
Democratic	Tammy Duckworth	1	0.2%
Democratic	Hakeem Jeffries (NY 8)	1	0.2%
Total votes		427	100
Votes necessary		214	>50

== See also ==
- Electoral history of Barack Obama
- Electoral history of George W. Bush
- Electoral history of Hillary Clinton
- Electoral history of Joe Biden
- Electoral history of Kamala Harris
- Electoral history of Kevin McCarthy
- Electoral history of Mike Johnson
- Electoral history of Newt Gingrich
- Electoral history of Paul Ryan
- Electoral history of Sarah Palin
