= Electoral history of John McCain =

Elections featuring American politician

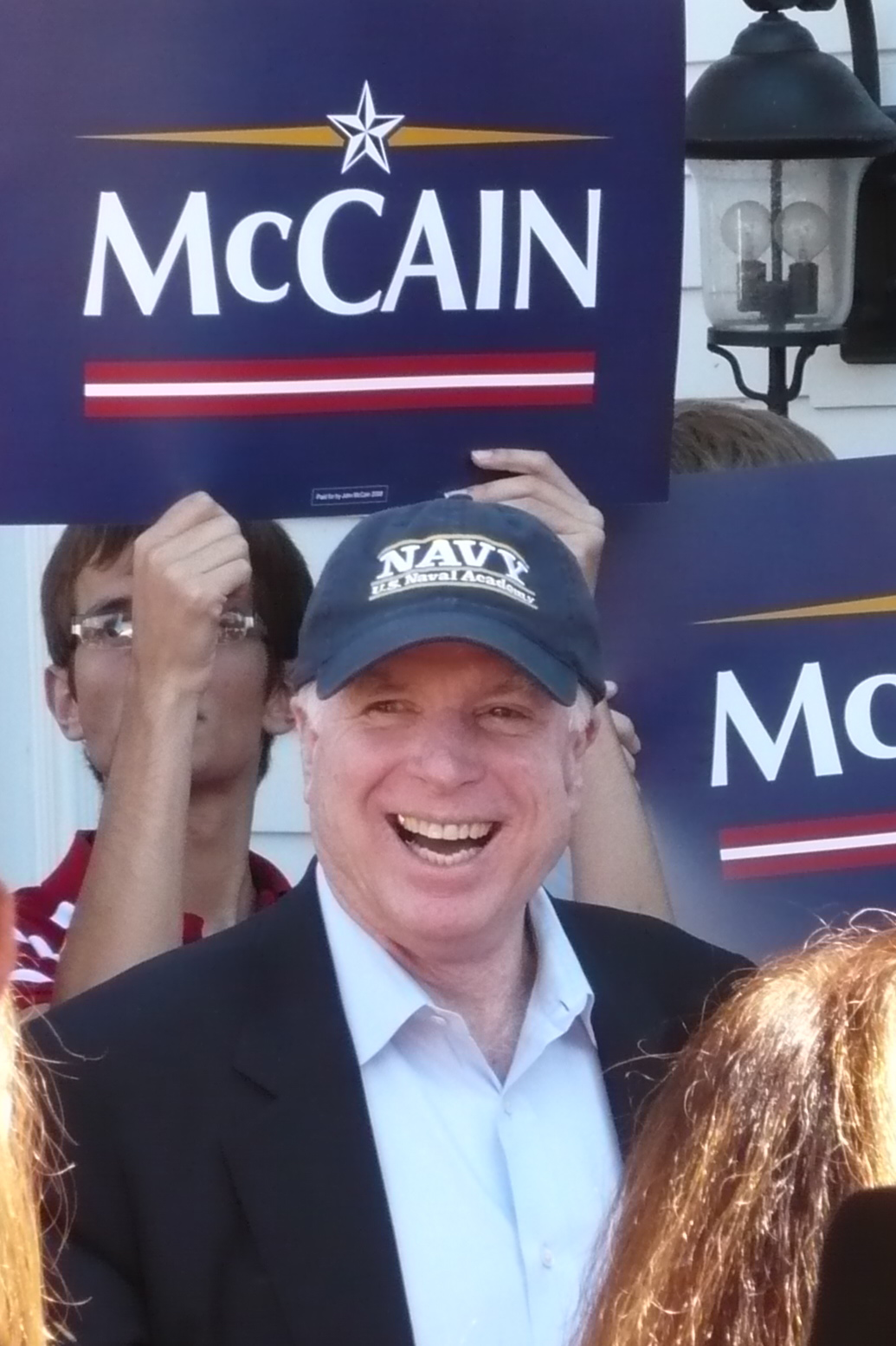
McCain on the presidential campaign trail in 2007

John McCain was the senior United States senator from Arizona from 1987 until his death in 2018 and was the 2008 Republican nominee for President of the United States; however, he lost the election to Senator Barack Obama of Illinois. McCain was involved in many elections on local, statewide and nationwide stage since his first election to the United States House of Representatives in 1982.

== House races (1982–1984) ==
1982 Arizona's 1st congressional district election
Primary election
Party	Candidate	Votes	%
Republican	John McCain	15,363	31.83
Republican	Ray Russell	12,500	25.89
Republican	James A. Mack	10,675	22.11
Republican	Donna Carlson-West	9,736	20.17
Total votes		48,274	100%
General election
Republican	John McCain	89,116	65.90
Democratic	William E. Hegarty	41,261	30.51
Libertarian	Richard K. Dodge	4,850	3.59
Total votes		135,227	100%

1984 Arizona's 1st congressional district election
Party	Candidate	Votes	%
Republican	John McCain	162,418	78.08
Democratic	Harry W. Braun	45,609	21.92
Total votes		208,027	100%

== Senate races (1986–2016) ==
1986 United States Senate election in Arizona
Party	Candidate	Votes	%
Republican	John McCain	521,850	60.47
Democratic	Richard Kimball	340,965	39.51
Write-in		106	0.01
Total votes		862,921	100%

1992 United States Senate election in Arizona
Primary election
Party	Candidate	Votes	%
Republican	John McCain	201,500	100.00
Total votes		201,500	100%
General election
Republican	John McCain	771,395	55.82
Democratic	Claire Sargent	436,321	31.57
Independent	Evan Mecham	145,361	10.52
Libertarian	Kiana Delamare	22,613	1.64
New Alliance	Ed Finkelstein	6,335	0.46
Independent	Robert B. Winn (write-in)	26	0.00
Total votes		1,382,051	100%

1998 United States Senate election in Arizona
Primary election
Party	Candidate	Votes	%
Republican	John McCain	206,490	99.73
Republican	Mark Healy (write-in)	568	0.27
Total votes		207,058	100%
General election
Republican	John McCain	696,577	68.74
Democratic	Ed Ranger	275,224	27.16
Libertarian	John C. Zajac	23,004	2.27
Reform	Bob Park	18,288	1.80
Independent	Bill Reilley (write-in)	187	0.02
Total votes		1,013,280	100%

2004 United States Senate election in Arizona
Primary election
Party	Candidate	Votes	%
Republican	John McCain	331,720	100.00
Total votes		331,720	100%
General election
Republican	John McCain	1,505,372	76.74
Democratic	Stuart Starky	404,507	20.62
Libertarian	Ernest Hancock	51,798	2.64
Total votes		1,961,677	100%

2010 United States Senate election in Arizona
Primary election
Party	Candidate	Votes	%
Republican	John McCain	333,744	56.25
Republican	J. D. Hayworth	190,229	32.06
Republican	Jim Deakin	69,328	11.69
Total votes		593,301	100%
General election
Republican	John McCain	1,005,615	58.86
Democratic	Rodney Glassman	592,011	34.65
Libertarian	David Nolan	80,097	4.69
Green	Jerry Joslyn	24,603	1.44
Independent	Ian Gilyeat (write-in)	5,938	0.35
Independent	Loyd Ellis (write-in)	160	0.01
Independent	Santos Enrique Chavez (write-in)	39	0.00
Independent	Sydney Dudikoff (write-in)	14	0.00
Independent	Raymond Caplette (write-in)	7	0.00
Total votes		1,708,484	100%

2016 United States Senate election in Arizona
Primary election
Party	Candidate	Votes	%
Republican	John McCain	302,532	51.16
Republican	Kelli Ward	235,988	39.91
Republican	Alex Meluskey	31,159	5.27
Republican	Clair Van Steenwyk	21,476	3.63
Republican	Sean Webster (write-in)	175	0.03
Total votes		591,330	100%
General election
Republican	John McCain	1,359,267	53.71
Democratic	Ann Kirkpatrick	1,031,245	40.75
Green	Gary W. Swing	138,634	5.48
Independent	Pat Quinn (write-in)	694	0.03
Independent	Sydney Dudikoff (write-in)	494	0.02
Independent	Selena Lopez (write-in)	223	0.01
Independent	Leonard A. Clark (write-in)	83	0.00
Independent	Anthony Camboni (write-in)	45	0.00
Independent	Sheila Bilyeu (write-in)	34	0.00
Independent	Gene Scott II (write-in)	7	0.00
Independent	Santos Enrique Chavez (write-in)	4	0.00
Total votes		2,530,730	100%

== 2000 presidential election ==
Washington primary for independent voters, 2000
Party	Candidate	Votes	%
Republican	John McCain	208,879	40.08
Republican	George W. Bush	118,234	22.68
Democratic	Al Gore	107,950	20.71
Democratic	Bill Bradley	69,352	13.31
Republican	Alan Keyes	9,369	1.80
Republican	Steve Forbes	3,387	0.65
Republican	Lyndon LaRouche	1,406	0.27
Republican	Gary Bauer	1,401	0.27
Republican	Orrin Hatch	1,240	0.24
Total votes		521,218	100.00%

California primary for independent voters, 2000
Party	Candidate	Votes	%
Republican	John McCain	791,064	38.03
Democratic	Al Gore	454,629	21.84
Republican	George W. Bush	443,304	21.29
Democratic	Bill Bradley	159,772	7.67
Green	Ralph Nader	89,210	4.29
Republican	Alan Keyes	57,695	2.77
Reform	Donald Trump	14,597	0.70
Libertarian	Harry Browne	11,973	0.58
Reform	George D. Weber	9,173	0.44
Republican	Steve Forbes	6,035	0.29
American Independent	Howard Phillips	5,957	0.29
Natural Law	John Hagelin	4,843	0.23
Green	Joel Kovel	4,646	0.22
	Others	23,839	1.15
Total votes		2,076,737	100.00

Red states won by Bush, yellow by McCain

2000 Republican primaries
Party	Candidate	Votes	%
Republican	George W. Bush	12,034,676	62.00
Republican	John McCain	6,061,332	31.23
Republican	Alan Keyes	985,819	5.08
Republican	Steve Forbes	171,860	0.89
Republican	Unpledged delegates	61,246	0.32
Republican	Gary Bauer	60,709	0.31
Republican	Others	35,659	0.18
Total votes		19,411,301	100.00

2000 Republican National Convention (Presidential tally)
Party	Candidate	Votes	%
Republican	George W. Bush	2,058	99.66
Republican	Alan Keyes	6	0.29
Republican	John McCain	1	0.05
Total votes		2,065	100.00

== 2008 presidential election ==
New Hampshire Republican vice presidential primary, 2008
Party	Candidate	Votes	%
Republican	John Barnes Jr.	40,207	62.43
Republican	John McCain (write-in)	4,305	6.68
Republican	Mike Huckabee (write-in)	3,227	5.01
Republican	Rudy Giuliani (write-in)	3,164	4.91
Republican	Mitt Romney (write-in)	2,396	3.72
Republican	Ron Paul (write-in)	1,938	3.01
Republican	Fred Thompson (write-in)	1,496	2.32
Republican	Duncan Hunter (write-in)	901	1.40
Republican	Joe Lieberman (write-in)	528	0.82
Republican	John Edwards (write-in)	515	0.80
Republican	Barack Obama (write-in)	474	0.74
Republican	Alan Keyes (write-in)	385	0.60
Republican	Hillary Clinton (write-in)	324	0.50
Write-in		4,543	7.05
Total votes		64,403	100.00

Results of 2008 presidential primaries

Republican presidential primaries, 2008
Party	Candidate	Votes	%
Republican	John McCain	9,838,910	46.49
Republican	Mitt Romney	4,681,436	22.12
Republican	Mike Huckabee	4,281,900	20.23
Republican	Ron Paul	1,214,563	5.74
Republican	Rudy Giuliani	597,499	2.82
Republican	Fred Thompson	303,845	1.44
Republican	Uncommitted	70,873	0.34
Republican	Alan Keyes	59,636	0.28
Republican	Duncan Hunter	39,883	0.19
Republican	Others	26,548	0.13
Write-in		48,004	0.23
Total votes		21,163,125	100.00

2008 Republican National Convention (Presidential tally)
Party	Candidate	Votes	%
Republican	John McCain	2,343	99.28
Republican	Ron Paul	15	0.64
Republican	Mitt Romney	2	0.09
Total votes		2,360	100.00

2008 United States presidential election
Party	Candidate	Votes	%
Democratic	Barack Obama/Joe Biden	69,456,897	52.91
Republican	John McCain/Sarah Palin	59,934,814	45.66
Independent	Ralph Nader/Matt Gonzalez	738,475	0.56
Libertarian	Bob Barr/Wayne Allyn Root	523,686	0.40
Constitution	Chuck Baldwin/Darrell Castle	199,314	0.15
Green	Cynthia McKinney/Rosa Clemente	161,603	0.12
	Others	248,380	0.19
Total votes		131,263,169	100.00

== See also ==
- Electoral history of Barack Obama
- Electoral history of Ralph Nader
- Electoral history of Sarah Palin
- Electoral history of Hillary Clinton
- Electoral history of Joe Biden
- Electoral history of Kamala Harris
- Electoral history of Mitt Romney
