= Electoral history of Paul Ryan =

Elections featuring US House Speaker

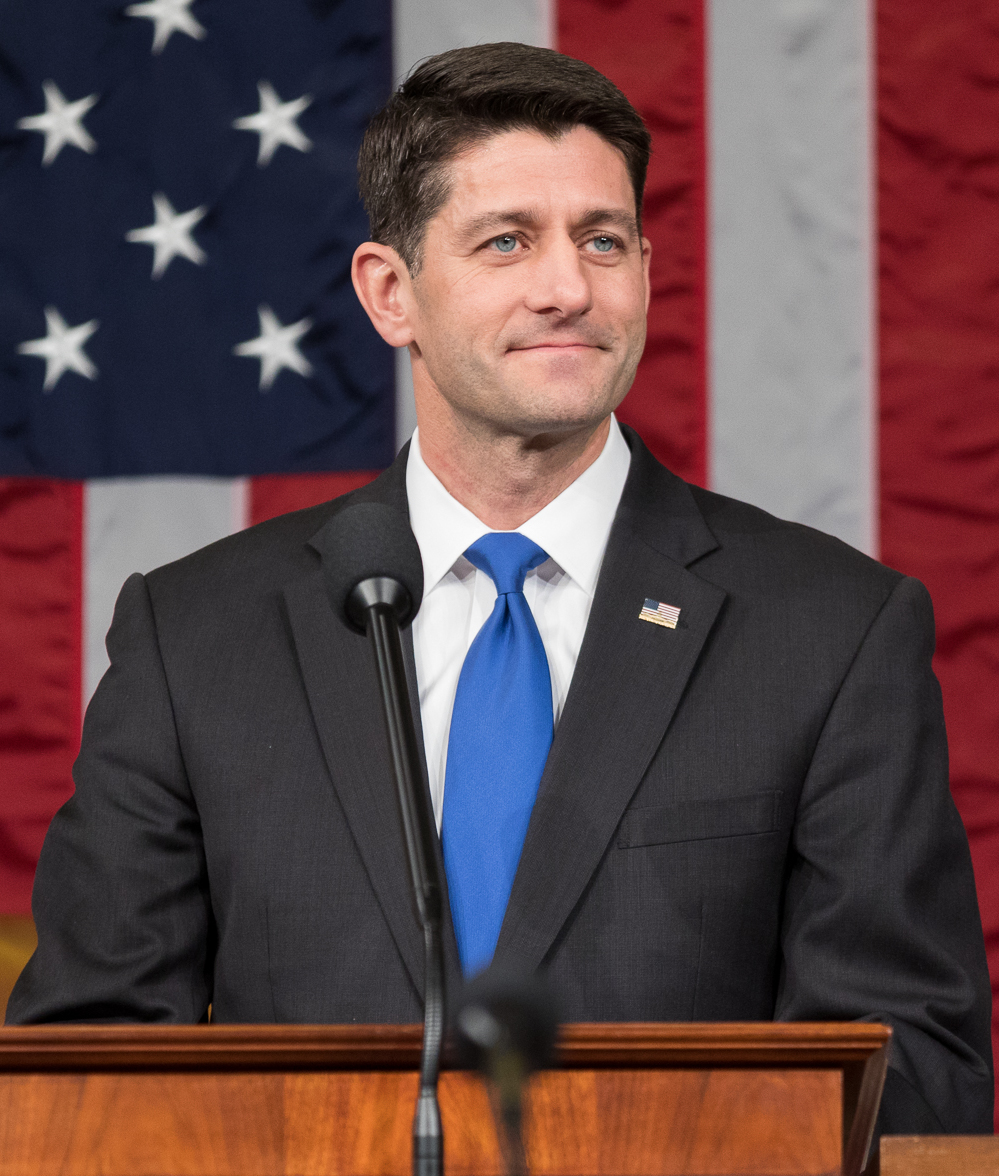
Speaker Paul Ryan, 2017

Electoral history of Paul Ryan, United States Representative from Wisconsin (1999-2019), 2012 Republican nominee for Vice President of the United States, and Speaker of the House of Representatives (2015-2019). Throughout his career, Paul Ryan had never lost an election other than his defeat in the 2012 United States presidential election; of all the times he has won, he has never received less than 54% of the vote.

== Wisconsin's 1st congressional district ==
Year	Election	Date	Elected				Defeated				Total	Plurality
1998	Primary	Sep. 8	Paul Ryan	Republican	15,859	80.74%	Michael J. Logan	Rep.	3,784	19.26%	19,643	12,075
1998	General	Nov. 3	Paul Ryan	Republican	108,475	57.11%	Lydia Spottswood	Dem.	81,164	42.73%	189,946	27,311
2000	General	Nov. 7	Paul Ryan (inc)	Republican	177,612	66.57%	Jeffrey C. Thomas	Dem.	88,885	33.32%	266,791	88,727
2002	General	Nov. 5	Paul Ryan (inc)	Republican	140,176	67.19%	Jeffrey C. Thomas	Dem.	63,895	30.63%	208,613	76,281
2002	General	Nov. 5	Paul Ryan (inc)	Republican	140,176	67.19%	George Meyers	Lib.	4,406	2.11%	208,613	76,281
2004	General	Nov. 2	Paul Ryan (inc)	Republican	233,372	65.37%	Jeffrey C. Thomas	Dem.	116,250	32.57%	356,976	117,122
2004	General	Nov. 2	Paul Ryan (inc)	Republican	233,372	65.37%	Norman Aulabaugh	Ind.	4,252	1.19%	356,976	117,122
2004	General	Nov. 2	Paul Ryan (inc)	Republican	233,372	65.37%	Don Bernau	Lib.	2,936	0.82%	356,976	117,122
2006	General	Nov. 7	Paul Ryan (inc)	Republican	161,320	62.63%	Jeffrey C. Thomas	Dem.	95,761	37.17%	257,596	65,559
2008	General	Nov. 4	Paul Ryan (inc)	Republican	231,009	63.97%	Marge Krupp	Dem.	125,268	34.69%	361,107	105,741
2008	General	Nov. 4	Paul Ryan (inc)	Republican	231,009	63.97%	Joseph Kexel	Lib.	4,606	1.28%	361,107	105,741
2010	General	Nov. 2	Paul Ryan (inc)	Republican	179,819	68.21%	John Heckenlively	Dem.	79,363	30.10%	263,627	100,456
2010	General	Nov. 2	Paul Ryan (inc)	Republican	179,819	68.21%	Joseph Kexel	Lib.	4,311	1.64%	263,627	100,456
2012	General	Nov. 6	Paul Ryan (inc)	Republican	200,423	54.90%	Rob Zerban	Dem.	158,414	43.39%	365,058	42,009
2012	General	Nov. 6	Paul Ryan (inc)	Republican	200,423	54.90%	Keith Deschler	Ind.	6,054	1.66%	365,058	42,009
2014	Primary	Aug. 12	Paul Ryan (inc)	Republican	40,813	94.27%	Jeremy Ryan	Rep.	2,450	5.66%	43,293	38,363
2014	General	Nov. 4	Paul Ryan (inc)	Republican	182,316	63.27%	Rob Zerban	Dem.	105,552	36.63%	288,170	76,764
2014	General	Nov. 4	Paul Ryan (inc)	Republican	182,316	63.27%	Keith Deschler (write-in)	Ind.	29	0.01%	288,170	76,764
2016	Primary	Aug. 9	Paul Ryan (inc)	Republican	57,364	84.06%	Paul Nehlen	Rep.	10,864	15.92%	68,243	46,500
2016	General	Nov. 8	Paul Ryan (inc)	Republican	230,072	64.95%	Ryan Solen	Dem.	107,003	30.21%	354,245	123,069
2016	General	Nov. 8	Paul Ryan (inc)	Republican	230,072	64.95%	Spencer Zimmerman	Ind. (Note: Party affiliation listed on ballots as "Trump Conservative.")	9,429	2.66%	354,245	123,069
2016	General	Nov. 8	Paul Ryan (inc)	Republican	230,072	64.95%	Jason Lebeck	Lib.	7,486	2.11%	354,245	123,069

== Speaker of the House ==
=== 2015 ===
2015 election for Speaker (Special) – 114th Congress
Party	Candidate	Votes	%
Republican	Paul Ryan (WI-01)	236	54.63
Democratic	Nancy Pelosi (CA-12)	184	42.60
Republican	Dan Webster (FL-10)	9	2.08
Democratic	Jim Cooper (TN-05)	1	0.23
Democratic	John Lewis (GA-05)	1	0.23
Republican	Colin Powell (Note: Not a member of the House at the time.)	1	0.23
Total votes		432	100
Votes necessary		217	>50

=== 2017 ===
2017 election for Speaker – 115th Congress
Party	Candidate	Votes	%
Republican	Paul Ryan (WI-01) (incumbent)	239	55.19
Democratic	Nancy Pelosi (CA-12)	189	43.65
Democratic	Tim Ryan (OH-13)	2	0.47
Democratic	Jim Cooper (TN-05)	1	0.23
Democratic	John Lewis (GA-05)	1	0.23
Republican	Dan Webster (FL-10)	1	0.23
Total votes		433	100
Votes necessary		217	>50

== Vice presidential nominee ==
=== 2012 ===
At the 2012 Republican National Convention, Paul Ryan was nominated for vice president by voice vote.

==== Nomination ====
2012 Republican National Convention, vice presidential tally
Candidate	Votes	%
Paul Ryan	_ (Note: Chosen by acclamation.)	100.00
Total votes		100.00

==== General election ====
2012 Electoral college results: Obama: 332 votes (26 states + DC); Romney: 206 votes (24 states)

2012 United States presidential election
Party	Candidate	Votes	%
Democratic	Barack Obama (inc.) / Joe Biden (inc.)	65,915,795	51.06%
Republican	Mitt Romney / Paul Ryan	60,933,504	47.20%
Libertarian	Gary Johnson / Jim Gray	1,275,971	0.99%
Green	Jill Stein / Cheri Honkala	469,627	0.36%
Constitution	Virgil Goode / Jim Clymer	122,389	0.09%
Peace and Freedom	Roseanne Barr / Cindy Sheehan	67,326	0.05%
Justice	Rocky Anderson / Luis J. Rodriguez	43,018	0.03%
Independent	Tom Hoefling / J.D. Ellis	40,628	0.03%
N/A	Other	217,152	0.17%
Total votes		129,085,410	100.00%
Democratic hold			

The Republican presidential ticket which included Paul Ryan as vice presidential candidate won 195,835 votes (51.65% of the vote) in Wisconsin's 1st congressional district. This was almost 5000 votes fewer than his simultaneous congressional run, and a lower percentage of the vote than he won in any of his congressional races for that district.

== See also ==
- Electoral history of Joe Biden
- Electoral history of Kamala Harris
- Electoral history of Mitt Romney
- Electoral history of Barack Obama
- Electoral history of Nancy Pelosi
- Electoral history of Kevin McCarthy
- Electoral history of Mike Johnson
- Electoral history of Sarah Palin
