= Electoral history of Kevin McCarthy =

Elections featuring US House Speaker

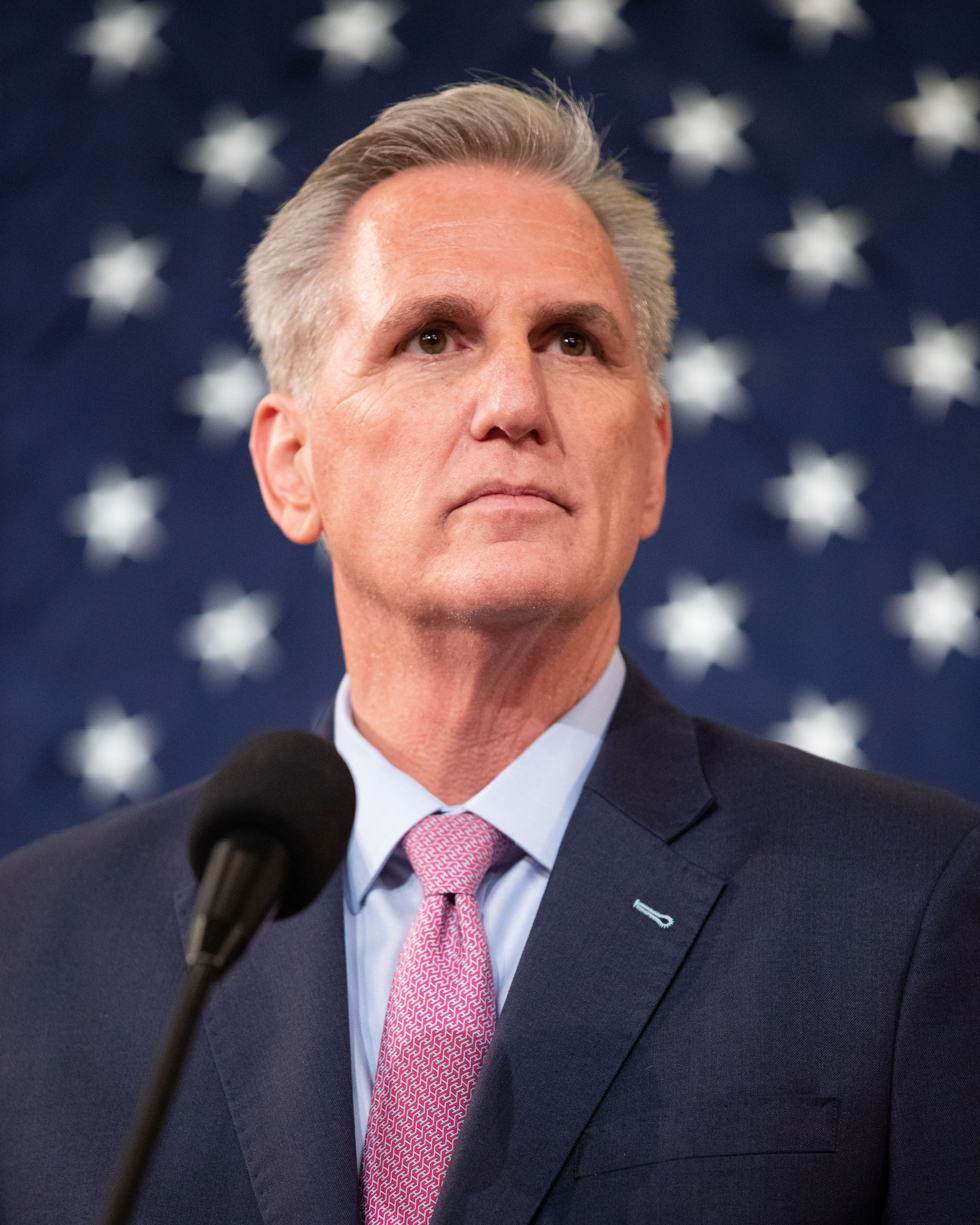
McCarthy in 2023

Kevin McCarthy is a former United States representative from California, who also served as the speaker of the United States House of Representatives. Before entering electoral politics, he served on the staff of Congressman Bill Thomas and was chair of the Young Republican National Federation between 1999 and 2001. He won his first election in 2000, being elected to represent Area 3 of the Kern Community College District Board of Trustees, and would later go on to be elected to the California State Assembly in 2002 and the U.S. House of Representatives in 2006.

== 2000 Kern Community College District Board of Trustees Area 3 election ==
In 2000, Kevin McCarthy was elected as one of two trustees for Area 3 in the Kern Community College District.

2000 Kern Community College District Board of Trustees Area 3 election
Party	Candidate	Votes	%
Nonpartisan	Kevin McCarthy	32,750	31.3
Nonpartisan	Dennis L. Beebe	19,053	18.2
Nonpartisan	Patrick O. Shaffer	17,436	16.7
Nonpartisan	John D. Gibson	13,840	13.2
Nonpartisan	Scott A. Tangeman	11,782	11.3
Nonpartisan	Monty D. Embry	9,610	9.2

== 2002 California's 32nd State Assembly district election ==
In the 2002 State Assembly election, McCarthy ran for the 32nd district.

2002 California's 32nd State Assembly district election
Party	Candidate	Votes	%
Republican	Kevin McCarthy	77,227	75.83
Democratic	Michael A. Shea, III	24,613	24.17
Invalid or blank votes		32	0.03
Total votes		101,872	100.00
Republican hold			

== 2004 California's 32nd State Assembly district election ==
McCarthy ran for re-election in the 2004 State Assembly election.

2004 California's 32nd State Assembly district election
Party	Candidate	Votes	%
Republican	Kevin McCarthy (incumbent)	129,510	78.66
Democratic	Marvin Armas	35,130	21.34
Total votes		164,640	100.00
Republican hold			

== 2006 California's 22nd congressional district election ==
In the 2006 United States House of Representatives elections, McCarthy ran for California's 22nd congressional district.

2006 California's 22nd congressional district election
Party	Candidate	Votes	%
Republican	Kevin McCarthy	133,278	70.70
Democratic	Sharon Beery	55,226	29.30
Total votes		188,504	100.00
Turnout			
Republican hold			

== 2008 California's 22nd congressional district election ==
McCarthy ran for his first re-election in the House of Representatives during the 2008 elections.

2008 California's 22nd congressional district election
Party	Candidate	Votes	%
Republican	Kevin McCarthy (incumbent)	224,549	100.00
Total votes		224,549	100.00
Turnout			61.56
Republican hold			

== 2010 California's 22nd congressional district election ==
During the 2010 elections, McCarthy was re-elected for a second time.

2010 California's 22nd congressional district election
Party	Candidate	Votes	%
Republican	Kevin McCarthy (incumbent)	173,490	98.8
Independent	John Uebersax (write-in)	2,173	1.2
Total votes		175,663	100.0
Republican hold			

== 2012 California's 23rd congressional district election ==
Ahead of the 2012 elections, McCarthy's district was renumbered as the 23rd. He was re-elected again.

2012 California's 23rd congressional district election
Primary election
Party	Candidate	Votes	%
Republican	Kevin McCarthy (incumbent)	71,109	72.2
No party preference	Terry Phillips	17,018	17.3
Republican	Eric Parker	10,414	10.6
Total votes		98,541	100.0
General election
Republican	Kevin McCarthy (incumbent)	158,161	73.2
No party preference	Terry Phillips	57,842	26.8
Total votes		216,003	100.0
Republican hold			

== 2014 California's 23rd congressional district election ==
In the 2014 elections, McCarthy won re-election.

2014 California's 23rd congressional district election
Primary election
Party	Candidate	Votes	%
Republican	Kevin McCarthy (incumbent)	58,334	99.1
Democratic	Raul Garcia (write-in)	313	0.5
Republican	Mike Biglay (write-in)	157	0.3
No party preference	Ronald L. Porter (write-in)	36	0.1
Libertarian	Gail K. Lightfoot (write-in)	31	0.1
Green	Noah Calugaru (write-in)	3	0.01
Total votes		58,871	100.0
General election
Republican	Kevin McCarthy (incumbent)	100,317	74.8
Democratic	Raul Garcia	33,726	25.2
Total votes		134,043	100.0
Republican hold			

== 2016 California's 23rd congressional district election ==
In the 2016 elections, McCarthy won re-election.

2016 California's 23rd congressional district election
Primary election
Party	Candidate	Votes	%
Republican	Kevin McCarthy (incumbent)	76,166	55.5
Democratic	Wendy Reed	37,696	27.4
Republican	Ken Mettler	17,738	12.9
Republican	Gerald Morris	5,734	4.2
Total votes		137,334	100.0
General election
Republican	Kevin McCarthy (incumbent)	167,116	69.2
Democratic	Wendy Reed	74,468	30.8
Total votes		241,584	100.0
Republican hold			

== 2018 California's 23rd congressional district election ==
In the 2018 elections, McCarthy won re-election.

2018 California's 23rd congressional district election
Primary election
Party	Candidate	Votes	%
Republican	Kevin McCarthy (incumbent)	81,633	68.8
Democratic	Tatiana Matta	14,935	12.6
Democratic	Wendy Reed	11,974	10.1
Democratic	Mary Helen Barro	6,363	5.4
No party preference	James Davis	2,076	1.7
Democratic	Kurtis Wilson	1,691	1.4
Total votes		118,672	100.0
General election
Republican	Kevin McCarthy (incumbent)	131,113	63.7
Democratic	Tatiana Matta	74,661	36.3
Total votes		205,774	100.0
Republican hold			

== 2019 Speaker of the United States House of Representatives election ==
In the 2019 Speaker of the United States House of Representatives election, McCarthy did not garner enough votes from members of the 116th Congress to become the next speaker of the United States House of Representatives.

2019 Speaker of the United States House of Representatives election
Party	Candidate	Votes	%
Democratic	Nancy Pelosi (CA 12)	220	51.17
Republican	Kevin McCarthy (CA 23)	192	44.66
Republican	Jim Jordan (OH 4)	5	1.16
Democratic	Cheri Bustos (IL 17)	4	0.93
Democratic	Tammy Duckworth	2	0.47
Democratic	Stacey Abrams	1	0.23
Democratic	Joe Biden	1	0.23
Democratic	Marcia Fudge (OH 11)	1	0.23
Democratic	Joe Kennedy III (MA 4)	1	0.23
Democratic	John Lewis (GA 5)	1	0.23
Republican	Thomas Massie (KY 4)	1	0.23
Democratic	Stephanie Murphy (FL 7)	1	0.23
Total votes		430	100
Votes necessary		216	>50

== 2020 California's 23rd congressional district election ==
In the 2020 elections, McCarthy won re-election.

2020 California's 23rd congressional district election
Primary election
Party	Candidate	Votes	%
Republican	Kevin McCarthy (incumbent)	107,897	66.5
Democratic	Kim Mangone	54,375	33.5
Total votes		162,272	100.0
General election
Republican	Kevin McCarthy (incumbent)	190,222	62.1
Democratic	Kim Mangone	115,896	37.9
Total votes		306,118	100.0
Republican hold			

== 2021 Speaker of the United States House of Representatives election ==
In the 2021 Speaker of the United States House of Representatives election, McCarthy received 209 votes from members of the 117th Congress, though this was not enough to win the speakership.

2021 Speaker of the United States House of Representatives election
Party	Candidate	Votes	%
Democratic	Nancy Pelosi (incumbent) (CA 12)	216	50.59
Republican	Kevin McCarthy (CA 23)	209	48.95
Democratic	Hakeem Jeffries (NY 8)	1	0.23
Democratic	Tammy Duckworth	1	0.23
Total votes		427	100
Votes necessary		214	>50

== 2022 California's 20th congressional district election ==
Ahead of the 2022 elections, McCarthy's district was renumbered to the 20th. Nevertheless, he won re-election.

2022 California's 20th congressional district election
Primary election
Party	Candidate	Votes	%
Republican	Kevin McCarthy (incumbent)	85,748	61.3
Democratic	Marisa Wood	33,511	24.0
Democratic	Ben Dewell	8,757	6.3
Republican	James Davis	6,382	4.6
Republican	James Macaulay	5,488	3.9
Total votes		139,886	100.0
General election
Republican	Kevin McCarthy (incumbent)	153,847	67.2
Democratic	Marisa Wood	74,934	32.8
Total votes		228,781	100.0
Republican hold			

== 2023 Speaker of the United States House of Representatives election ==
In the 2023 Speaker of the United States House of Representatives election, McCarthy prevailed on the fifteenth ballot, receiving 216 votes from members of the 118th Congress.

2023 Speaker of the United States House of Representatives election
January 3, 2023 – 1st ballot
Party	Candidate	Votes	%
Democratic	Hakeem Jeffries (NY 8)	212	48.85
Republican	Kevin McCarthy (CA 20)	203	46.78
Republican	Andy Biggs (AZ 5)	10	2.30
Republican	Jim Jordan (OH 4)	6	1.38
Republican	Jim Banks (IN 3)	1	0.23
Republican	Byron Donalds (FL 19)	1	0.23
Republican	Lee Zeldin	1	0.23
Total votes:		434	100
Votes necessary:		218	>50
January 7, 2023 – 15th ballot
Party	Candidate	Votes	%
Republican	Kevin McCarthy (CA 20)	216	50.47
Democratic	Hakeem Jeffries (NY 8)	212	49.53
Total votes:		428	100
Votes necessary:		215	>50

== See also ==
- Electoral history of Joe Biden
- Electoral history of Kamala Harris
- Electoral history of Mike Johnson
- Electoral history of Nancy Pelosi
- Electoral history of Newt Gingrich
- Electoral history of Paul Ryan
