= 1974 Georgia's 6th congressional district election =

- November 5, 1974
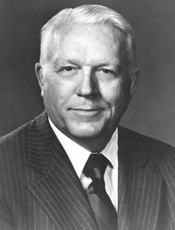

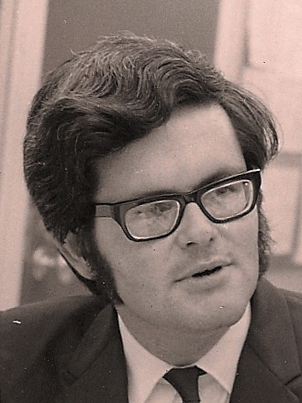
Nominee	John Flynt	Newt Gingrich
Party	Democratic	Republican
Popular vote	49,082	46,308
Percentage	51.45%	48.55%
- County results Flynt: 50–60% 60–70% 70–80% Gingrich: 50–60%
Representative before election
John James Flynt, Jr.
Democratic
Elected Representative
John James Flynt, Jr.
Democratic

The 1974 United States House of Representatives election in Georgia's 6th congressional district was the election for the Representative of Georgia's 6th district to the United States House of Representatives which was held on November 5, 1974. This election is notable for being the beginning of the political career of Newt Gingrich, future speaker of the United States House of Representatives, who was then a little-known professor from the University of West Georgia.

Incumbent Representative John J. Flynt in his previous nine runs had never faced any serious challenge, winning re-election in 1972 without any formal opposition. However, in 1974, he was nearly defeated by political newcomer Gingrich. This came as a considerable surprise. Flynt was known as one of the most conservative Democrats in the House, and 1974 was a very poor year for Republicans nationally due to fallout from the Watergate scandal. Gingrich would face Flynt in another close race in 1976, but would come short again. Flynt would retire in 1978 rather than fight another close match (and possibly unsuccessful re-election bid) with Gingrich, thus finally giving Republicans a victory in a district that had not elected a Republican to the House of Representatives since Reconstruction.

== See also ==
- 1974 United States House of Representatives elections
