= Electoral history of Hillary Clinton =

Elections featuring American politician

Hillary Clinton, a Democrat, served as the 67th United States Secretary of State (2009–2013), United States Senator from New York (2001–2009), and First Lady of the United States (1993–2001). She was also a candidate in the 2008 and 2016 Democratic presidential primaries. In 2016, Clinton was her party's presidential candidate but lost the election to her Republican opponent, Donald Trump.

== 1978 and 1980 Legal Services Corporation nominations ==
United States Senate confirmations to the Legal Services Corporation:

1978

- Confirmed for a two-year term, expiring in 1980.

1980

- Confirmed for a three-year term, expiring in 1983.

== 2000 New York United States Senate election ==
2000 Democratic primary election results
Party	Candidate	Votes	%
Democratic	Hillary Clinton	565,353	81.98
Democratic	Mark P. McMahon	124,315	18.03

2000 United States Senate election in New York
Party	Candidate	Votes	%
Democratic	Hillary Rodham Clinton	3,562,415	
Working Families	Hillary Rodham Clinton	102,094	
Liberal	Hillary Rodham Clinton	82,801	
total	Hillary Rodham Clinton	3,747,310	55.27
Republican	Rick Lazio	2,724,589	
Conservative	Rick Lazio	191,141	
total	Rick Lazio	2,915,730	43.01
Independence	Jeffrey Graham	43,181	0.64
Green	Mark Dunau	40,991	0.60
Right to Life	John Adefope	21,439	0.32
Libertarian	John Clifton	4,734	0.07
Constitution	Louis Wein	3,414	0.05
Socialist Workers	Jacob Perasso	3,040	0.04

== 2006 New York United States Senate election ==
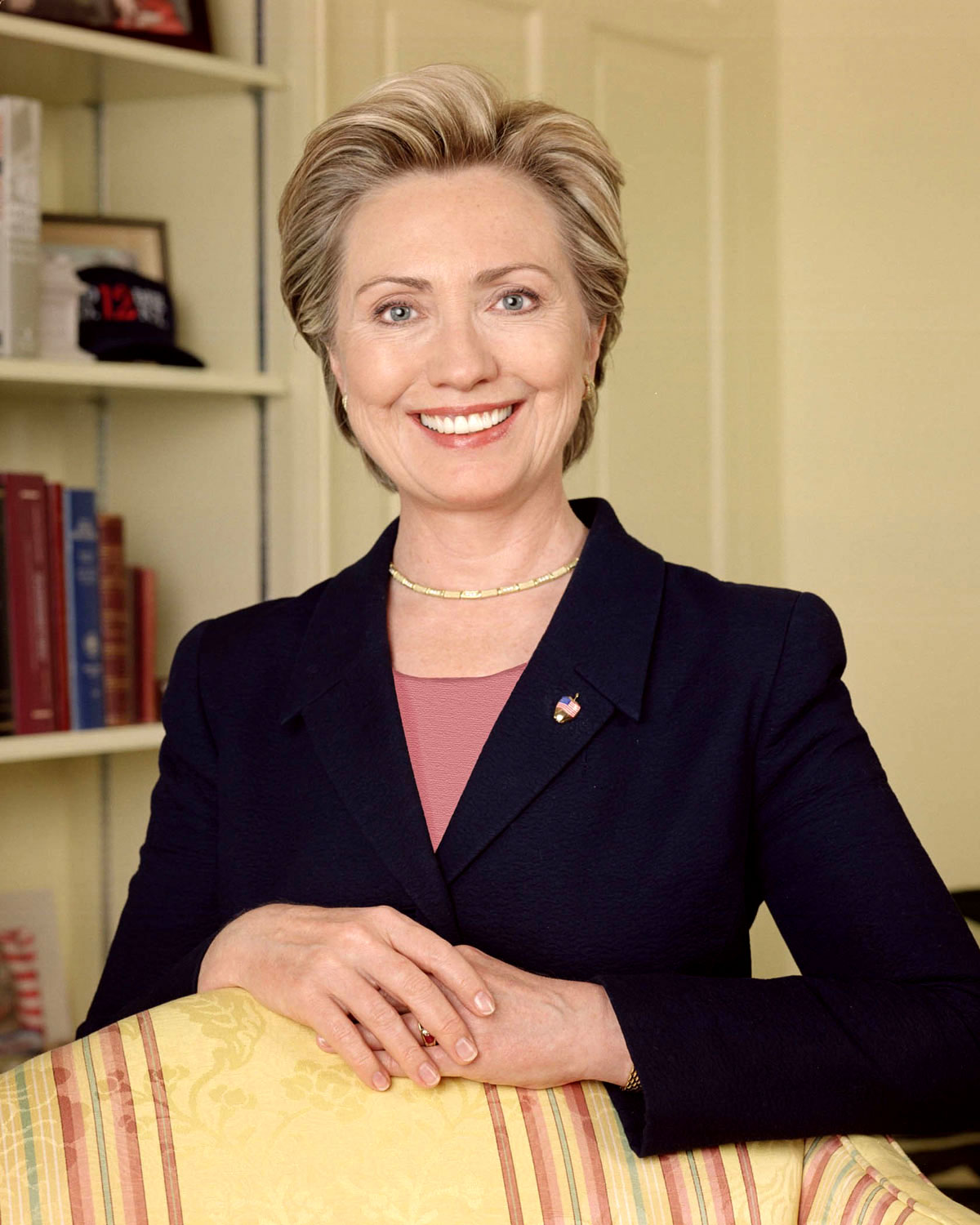
Clinton

2006 Working Families primary election results
Party	Candidate	Votes	%
Working Families	Hillary Rodham Clinton (Incumbent)	9,364	93.64
Working Families	Jonathan B. Tasini	636	6.36
Total votes		10,000	100.00

2006 Democratic primary election results
Party	Candidate	Votes	%
Democratic	Hillary Rodham Clinton (Incumbent)	640,955	83.68
Democratic	Jonathan B. Tasini	124,999	16.32
Total votes		765,954	100.00

2006 United States Senate election in New York
Party	Candidate	Votes	%
Democratic	Hillary Rodham Clinton	2,698,931	
Independence	Hillary Rodham Clinton	160,705	
Working Families	Hillary Rodham Clinton	148,792	
total	Hillary Rodham Clinton (Incumbent)	3,008,428	67.0
Republican	John Spencer	1,212,902	
Conservative	John Spencer	179,287	
total	John Spencer	1,392,189	31.0
Green	Howie Hawkins	55,469	1.2
Libertarian	Jeff Russell	20,996	0.5
Socialist Equality	Bill Van Auken	6,004	0.1
Socialist Workers	Roger Calero	6,967	0.2
Majority		1,616,239	36.0
Turnout		4,490,053	38.48%
Democratic hold			

== 2008 United States presidential election ==
=== 2008 Democratic Party primary elections ===
Cumulative primary and caucus votes, excluding penalized contests:

- Barack Obama - 16,706,853 (49.03%)
- Hillary Rodham Clinton - 16,239,821 (47.66%)
- John Edwards* - 742,010 (2.17%)
- Bill Richardson* - 89,054 (0.26%)
- Uncommitted - 82,660 (0.24%)
- Dennis Kucinich* - 68,482 (0.2%)
- Joe Biden* - 64,041 (0.18%)
- Mike Gravel* - 27,662 (0.08%)
- Christopher Dodd* - 25,300 (0.07%)
- Others - 22,556 (0.06%)

Cumulative primary and caucus votes, including penalized contests:

- Hillary Rodham Clinton - 18,225,175 (48.03%)
- Barack Obama - 17,988,182 (47.41%)
- John Edwards* - 1,006,275 (2.65%)
- Uncommitted - 299,610 (0.79%)
- Bill Richardson* - 106,073 (0.28%)
- Dennis Kucinich* - 103,994 (0.27%)
- Joe Biden* - 81,641 (0.22%)
- Scattering - 44,348 (0.12%)
- Mike Gravel* - 40,251 (0.11%)
- Christopher Dodd* - 35,281 (0.09%)

(* denotes dropped out from race before end of caucuses and primaries)

=== 2008 Democratic Party delegate count ===
2008 Democratic National Convention (2,118 delegates were needed to secure nomination)
Candidate	Pledged Delegates	Total delegates (including superdelegates)	Floor vote
Barack Obama	1,765	2,156	3,188.5
Hillary Rodham Clinton	1,637	1,922	1,010.5
John Edwards	4	6	0

== 2009 United States Secretary of State nomination ==
2009 United States Senate confirmation to be Secretary of State
January 21, 2009	Party			All votes
	Democratic	Republican	Independent	All votes
Yea	53	39	2	94
Nay	0	2	0	2
Simple majority (49 of 96 votes) required – Nomination confirmed

== 2016 United States presidential election ==
=== 2016 Democratic Party primary elections ===
Cumulative results of the 2016 Democratic Party presidential primaries
Party	Candidate	Votes	%
Democratic	Hillary Clinton	16,849,779	55.23
Democratic	Bernie Sanders	13,167,848	43.12
Democratic	Martin O'Malley	110,423	0.36
Democratic	Other	395,523	1.30

=== 2016 Democratic Party delegate count ===
2016 Democratic National Convention (2,382 delegates needed to secure nomination)
Party	Candidate	Votes	%
Democratic	Hillary Clinton	2,842	59.7
Democratic	Bernie Sanders	1,865	39.1
Democratic	Abstention	56	1.2

Candidate	Pledged delegates	Convention Floor vote
Hillary Rodham Clinton	2,205 (54.43%)	2,842 (59.67%)
Bernie Sanders	1,846 (45.57%)	1,865 (39.16%)
Martin O'Malley	0	0
Available	0	56 (1.17%)

=== 2016 U.S. presidential election ===
Electoral results
Presidential candidate Vice presidential candidate	Party	Popular votes	%	Electoral votes
Donald Trump; Mike Pence	Republican	62,985,106	46.09%	304
Hillary Clinton; Tim Kaine	Democratic	65,853,625	48.18%	227
Gary Johnson; Bill Weld	Libertarian	4,489,233	3.28%	0
Jill Stein; Ajamu Baraka	Green	1,457,222	1.07%	0
Evan McMullin; Mindy Finn	Independent	731,788	0.54%	0
Others		1,152,671	0.84%	0
Total		136,669,237	100%	538

== See also ==
- Electoral history of Bill Clinton
- Electoral history of Barack Obama
- Electoral history of Donald Trump
- Electoral history of Joe Biden
- Electoral history of Kamala Harris
- Electoral history of Bernie Sanders
- Electoral history of Sarah Palin
