= Electoral history of Mitt Romney =

Elections featuring American politician

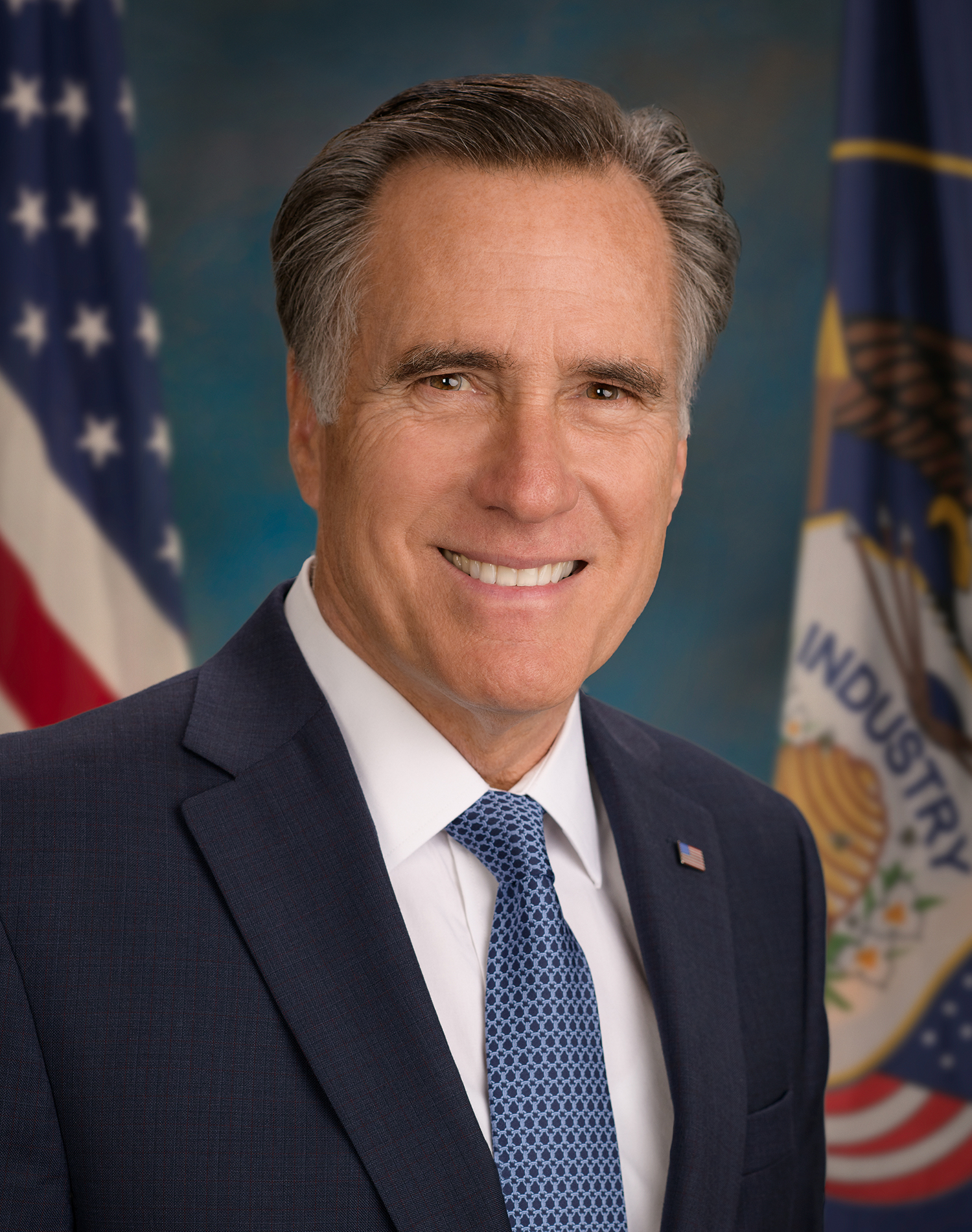
Mitt Romney

This is the electoral history of Mitt Romney, the 70th governor of Massachusetts (2003–2007) and former United States senator from Utah. Romney ran for president in the 2008 and 2012 presidential primaries. In 2018, Romney declared his candidacy for the United States Senate in the state of Utah and on November 6 was declared the winner.

== U.S. Senate election in Massachusetts ==
=== 1994 ===
1994 United States Senate election in Massachusetts, Republican primary
Party	Candidate	Votes	%
Republican	Mitt Romney	188,280	82.04%
Republican	John Lakian	40,898	17.82%
Write-in		318	0.14%
Total votes		229,496	100.00%

Results by municipality

1994 United States Senate election in Massachusetts
Party	Candidate	Votes	%
Democratic	Ted Kennedy (incumbent)	1,266,011	58.07%
Republican	Mitt Romney	894,005	41.01%
Libertarian	LauraLeigh Dozier	14,484	0.66%
LaRouche for President	William A. Ferguson Jr.	4,776	0.22%
Write-in		688	0.03%
Total votes		2,179,964	100.00%
Democratic hold			

== Gubernatorial election ==
=== 2002 ===
2002 Massachusetts gubernatorial election, Republican primary
Party	Candidate	Votes	%
Republican	Mitt Romney	unopposed	100.00%
Total votes			100.00%

Results by municipality

2002 Massachusetts gubernatorial election
Party	Candidate	Votes	%
Republican	Mitt Romney	1,091,988	49.77%
Democratic	Shannon O'Brien	985,981	44.94%
Green	Jill Stein	76,350	3.49%
Libertarian	Carla Howell	23,044	1.05%
Independent	Barbara Johnson	15,335	0.70%
Write-in		1,301	0.06%
Total votes		2,194,179	100.00%
Republican hold			

== Presidential elections ==
=== 2008 ===
First place by popular vote and plurality of delegates John McCain (37) Mitt Romney (11) Mike Huckabee (8)

2008 Republican Party presidential primaries
Party	Candidate	Votes	%
Republican	John McCain	9,787,238	46.56%
Republican	Mitt Romney	4,662,443	22.18%
Republican	Mike Huckabee	4,267,267	20.30%
Republican	Ron Paul	1,179,004	5.61%
Republican	Rudy Giuliani	597,624	2.84%
Republican	Fred Thompson	294,100	1.40%
Republican	Uncommitted	70,348	0.34%
Republican	Alan Keyes	59,718	0.28%
Republican	Duncan L. Hunter	39,928	0.19%
Republican	Scattering	39,301	0.19%
Republican	Tom Tancredo	8,612	0.04%
Republican	John H. Cox	3,351	0.02%
Republican	Sam Brownback	2,838	0.01%
Total votes		21,011,772	100.00%

2008 Republican National Convention
Party	Candidate	Votes	%
Republican	John McCain	2,343	99.28%
Republican	Ron Paul	15	0.64%
Republican	Mitt Romney	2	0.09%
Republican	Abstention	14	0.59%
Total votes		2,380	100.00%

=== 2012 ===
First place by first-instance vote Mitt Romney (42) Rick Santorum (11) Newt Gingrich (2) Ron Paul (1)

2012 Republican Party presidential primaries
Party	Candidate	Votes	%
Republican	Mitt Romney	9,685,780	51.50%
Republican	Rick Santorum	3,909,621	20.79%
Republican	Newt Gingrich	2,718,937	14.46%
Republican	Ron Paul	2,049,410	10.90%
Republican	Jon Huntsman Jr.	84,730	0.45%
Republican	Rick Perry	54,769	0.29%
Republican	Michele Bachmann	41,429	0.22%
Total votes		18,544,676	100.00%

2012 Republican National Convention
Party	Candidate	Votes	%
Republican	Mitt Romney	2,061	90.16%
Republican	Ron Paul	190	8.31%
Republican	Rick Santorum	9	0.39%
Republican	Jon Huntsman Jr.	1	0.04%
Republican	Michele Bachmann	1	0.04%
Republican	Buddy Roemer	1	0.04%
Republican	Abstention	23	1.01%
Total votes		2,286	100.00%

2012 Electoral college results: Obama: 332 votes (26 states + DC); Romney: 206 votes (24 states)

2012 United States presidential election
Party	Candidate	Votes	%
Democratic	Barack Obama (inc.) / Joe Biden (inc.)	65,915,795	51.06%
Republican	Mitt Romney / Paul Ryan	60,933,504	47.20%
Libertarian	Gary Johnson / Jim Gray	1,275,971	0.99%
Green	Jill Stein / Cheri Honkala	469,627	0.36%
Constitution	Virgil Goode / Jim Clymer	122,389	0.09%
Peace and Freedom	Roseanne Barr / Cindy Sheehan	67,326	0.05%
Justice	Rocky Anderson / Luis J. Rodriguez	43,018	0.03%
Independent	Tom Hoefling / J.D. Ellis	40,628	0.03%
N/A	Other	217,152	0.17%
Total votes		129,085,410	100.00%
Democratic hold			

== U.S. Senate election in Utah ==
=== 2018 ===
2018 United States Senate election in Utah, Republican primary
Party	Candidate	Votes	%
Republican	Mitt Romney	240,021	71.27%
Republican	Mike Kennedy	96,771	28.73%
Total votes		336,792	100.00%

Results by county

2018 United States Senate election in Utah
Party	Candidate	Votes	%
Republican	Mitt Romney	665,215	62.59%
Democratic	Jenny Wilson	328,541	30.91%
Constitution	Tim Aalders	28,774	2.71%
Libertarian	Craig Bowden	27,607	2.60%
Independent American	Reed McCandless	12,708	1.20%
Write-in		52	0.00%
Total votes		1,062,897	100.00%
Republican hold			

== See also ==
- Electoral history of Barack Obama
- Electoral history of Paul Ryan
- Electoral history of Kamala Harris
- Mitt Romney 2008 presidential campaign
- Mitt Romney 2012 presidential campaign
