= Electoral history of Sarah Palin =

Elections featuring Governor of Alaska

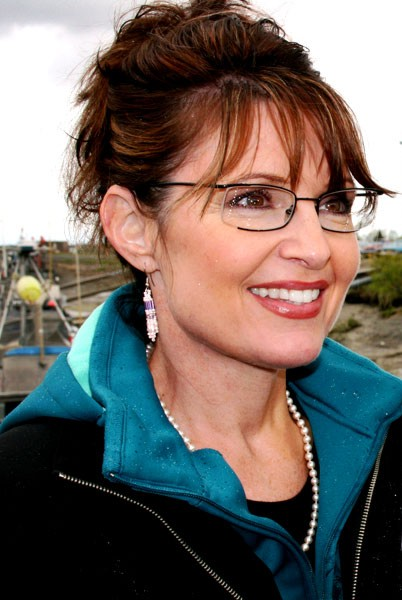
Sarah Palin on June 2, 2007

Electoral history of Sarah Palin, Governor of Alaska (2006–2009) and Republican vice presidential nominee in the 2008 United States presidential election.

== National elections ==
2008 United States presidential election

- Barack Obama/Joe Biden (D) – 69,498,516 (53%) and 365 electoral votes (28 states, NE-02, and D.C. carried)
- John McCain/Sarah Palin (R) – 59,948,323 (46%) and 173 electoral votes (22 states carried)

== Alaska statewide races ==
2022 Alaska's at-large congressional district election
Party	Candidate	First Choice			Round 1			Round 2			Round 3	
Party	Candidate	Votes	%	Transfer	Votes	%	Transfer	Votes	%	Transfer	Votes	%
Democratic	Mary Peltola (incumbent)	128,553	48.77%	+202	128,755	48.66%	+1,031	129,786	49.22%	+7,477	137,263	54.96%
Republican	Sarah Palin	67,866	25.74%	+464	68,330	25.82%	+1,069	69,399	26.32%	+43,072	112,471	45.04%
Republican	Nick Begich	61,513	23.33%	+992	62,505	23.62%	+1,994	64,499	24.46%	−64,499	Eliminated	
Libertarian	Chris Bye	4,570	1.73%	+429	4,999	1.89%	−4,999	Eliminated				
Write-in		1,108	0.42%	1,108	Eliminated							
Total votes		263,610			264,589			263,684			249,734	
Blank or inactive ballots					2,208		+905	3,113		+13,950	17,063	
Democratic hold												

2022 Alaska's at-large congressional district special election
Party	Candidate	Round 1			Round 2	
Party	Candidate	Votes	%	Transfer	Votes	%
Democratic	Mary Peltola	75,799	39.57%	+15,467	91,266	51.48%
Republican	Sarah Palin	58,973	30.79%	+27,053	86,026	48.52%
Republican	Nick Begich	53,810	28.09%	−52,536	Eliminated	
Write-in		2,974	1.55%	−2,974	Eliminated	
Total votes		191,556	100.00%		177,423	92.62%
Inactive ballots		0	0.00%	+14,133	14,133	7.38%
Democratic gain from Republican						

2006 Gubernatorial Election, Alaska
Party	Candidate	Votes	%	±%
Republican	Sarah Palin / Sean Parnell	114,697	48.33	−7.6
Democratic	Tony Knowles / Ethan Berkowitz	97,238	40.97	+0.3
Independent	Andrew Halcro / Fay Von Gemmingen	22,443	9.46	n/a
Independence	Don Wright / Douglas L. Welton	1,285	0.54	−0.4
Libertarian	Billy Toien / Robert D. Mirabal	682	0.29	−0.2
Green	David Massie	593	0.25	−1.0
Write-in candidates		384	0.16	+0.1
Plurality		17,459	7.36	
Turnout		238,307	51.1	
Republican hold		Swing	4.0	

Alaska Republican Gubernatorial Primary Election, 2006
Candidate	Votes	%
Sarah Palin	51,443	50.59
John Binkley	30,349	29.84
Frank Murkowski (incumbent)	19,412	19.09
Gerald Heikes	280	0.28
Merica Hlatcu	211	0.21

Alaska Republican Lieutenant Gubernatorial Primary Election, 2002
Candidate	Votes	%
Loren Leman	21,076	29.34
Sarah Palin	19,114	26.61
Robin L. Taylor	16,053	22.35
Gail Phillips	13,804	19.22
Paul Wieler	1,777	2.47

== Wasilla mayoral races ==
Wasilla, Alaska Mayoral Election, 1999
Candidate	Votes	%
Sarah Palin (incumbent)	909	73.6
John Stein	292	23.6
Cliff Silvers	32	2.6

Wasilla, Alaska Mayoral Election, 1996
Candidate	Votes	%
Sarah Palin	651	57.6
John Stein (incumbent)	440	38.9
Cliff Silvers	36	3.5

== Wasilla City Council races ==
Wasilla, Alaska City Council Election, Seat E, 1995
Candidate	Votes	%
Sarah Palin (incumbent)	413	68.4
R'nita Rogers	185	30.6
Write-ins	6	1.0

Wasilla, Alaska City Council Election, Seat E, 1992
Candidate	Votes	%
Sarah Palin	530	54.9
John Hartrick	310	32.1
Write-ins	125	13.0

== See also ==
- Electoral history of Joe Biden
- Electoral history of John McCain
- Electoral history of Barack Obama
- Electoral history of Kamala Harris
- Electoral history of Hillary Clinton
