= 1987 United States House of Representatives elections =

- April 7 – August 18, 1987

2 of the 435 seats in the United States House of Representatives 218 seats needed for a majority
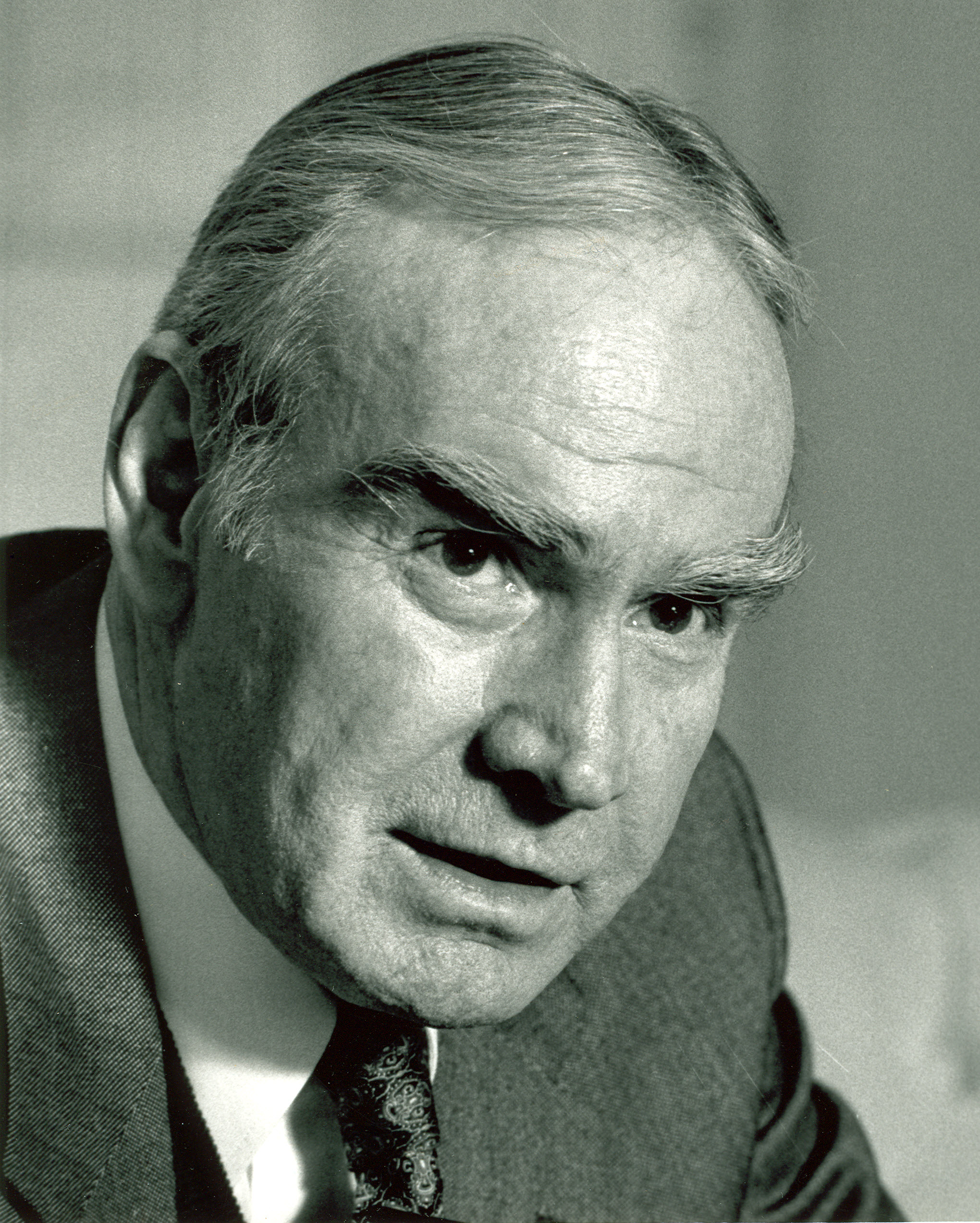

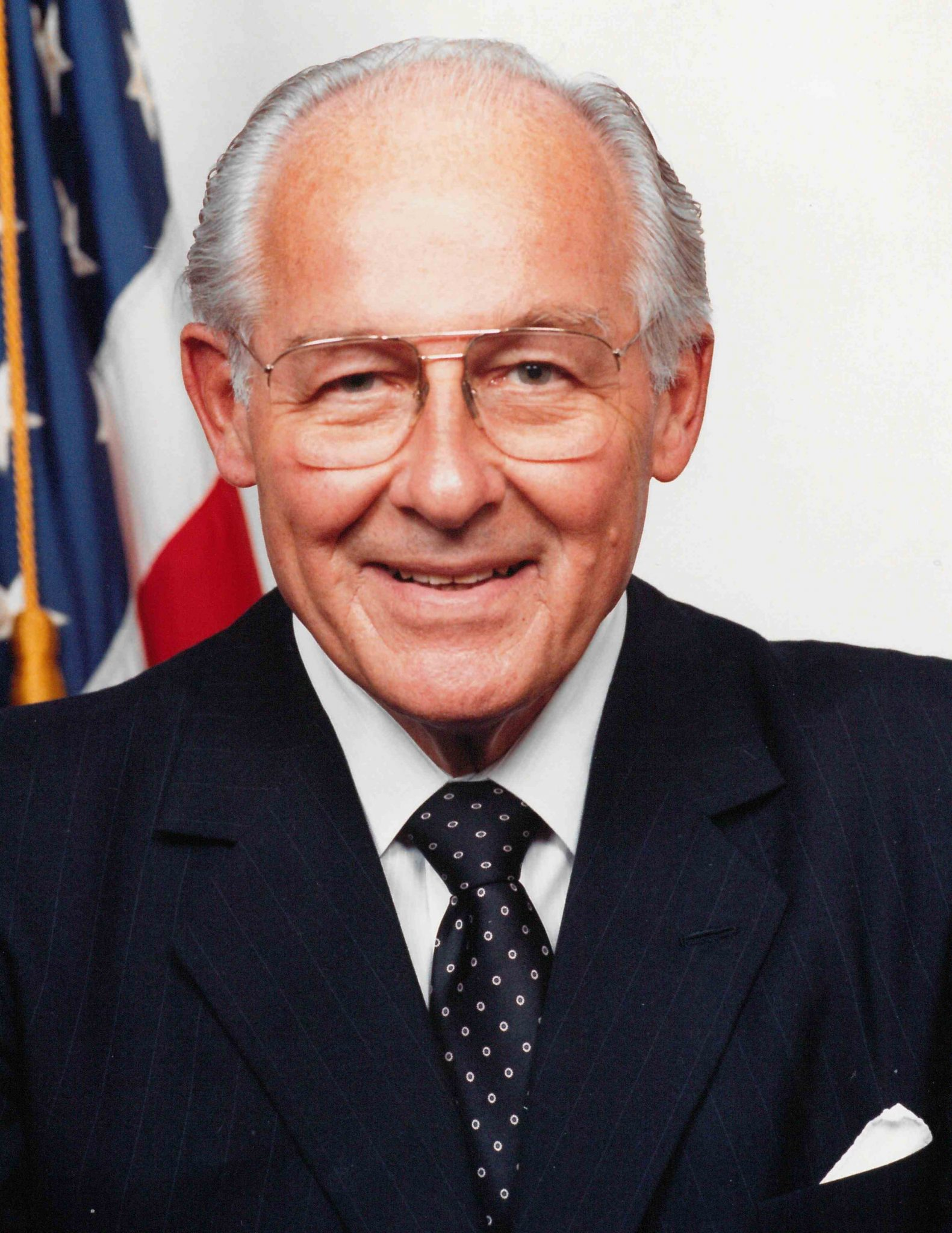
	Majority party	Minority party
Leader	Jim Wright	Robert H. Michel
Party	Democratic	Republican
Leader since	January 6, 1987	January 3, 1981
Leader's seat	Texas 12th	Illinois 18th
Last election	258 seats, 54.3%	177 seats, 44.4%
Seats before	258	177
Seat change	0	0
Seats up	1	1
Races won	1	1

There were two special elections to the United States House of Representatives in 1987 during the 100th United States Congress.

== List of elections ==
Elections are listed by date and district.

District	Incumbent			This race	
District	Member	Party	First elected	Results	Candidates
California 5	Sala Burton	Democratic	1983 (special)	Incumbent died February 1, 1987. A special election was held April 7, 1987, but no candidate received the required majority. New member won a special run-off election June 2, 1987. Democratic hold.	Primary ballot (April 7, 1987): ▌ Nancy Pelosi (Democratic) 36.12%; ▌Harry Britt (Democratic) 32.48%; ▌William Maher (Democratic) 14.25%; ▌Doris M. Ward (Democratic) 6.03%; ▌ Harriet Ross (Republican) 2.80%; ▌Carol Ruth Silver (Democratic) 2.69%; ▌Kevin W. Wadsworth (Republican) 1.63%; ▌Tom Spinosa (Republican) 1.59%; ▌Mike Garza (Republican) 1.17%; ▌ Karen Edwards (Independent) 0.42%; ▌ Sam Grove (Libertarian) 0.38%; ▌ Ted Zuur (Peace & Freedom) 0.17%; ▌ Catherine Renee Sedwick (Independent) 0.15%; ▌Brian Lantz (Democratic) 0.13%; Run-off ballot (June 2, 1987): ▌ ✓ Nancy Pelosi (Democratic) 63.36%; ▌Harriet Ross (Republican) 30.68%; ▌Karen Edwards (Independent) 2.19%; ▌Ted Zuur (Peace & Freedom) 1.51%; ▌Sam Grove (Libertarian) 1.37%; ▌Catherine Renee Sedwick (Independent) 0.90%
Connecticut 4	Stewart McKinney	Republican	1970	Incumbent died May 7, 1987. New member elected August 18, 1987. Republican hold.	▌ ✓ Chris Shays (Republican) 57.17%; ▌Christine Niedermeier (Democratic) 42.20%; ▌Nicholas J. Tarzia (War Against AIDS) 0.59%; Scattering 0.03%

== California's 5th congressional district ==
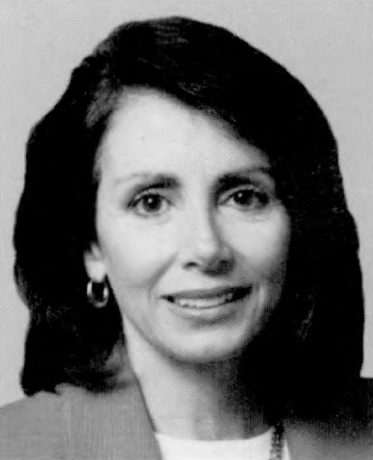
Nancy Pelosi, first elected in 1987.

Incumbent Democrat Sala Burton died of colorectal cancer on February 1, 1987, triggering a special election. A nonpartisan blanket special primary was held on April 7, 1987, featuring over a dozen candidates, including Nancy Pelosi, Harry Britt, and Carol Ruth Silver. As no candidate won over 50% of the vote, a run-off was held on June 2, 1987.

Democrat Nancy Pelosi won the election with 63% of the vote.

1987 California's 5th congressional district special general election
Party	Candidate	Votes	%	±%
Democratic	Nancy Pelosi	46,428	63.36	
Republican	Harriet Ross	22,478	30.68	
Independent	Karen Edwards	1,602	2.19	
Peace and Freedom	Theodore Zurr	1,105	1.51	
Libertarian	Sam Grove	1,007	1.37	
Independent	Catherine Renee Sedwick	659	0.9	
Total votes		73,279	100.0	
Democratic hold				

== See also ==
- List of special elections to the United States House of Representatives
- 100th United States Congress
