= Electoral history of Barack Obama =

Elections featuring President of the US

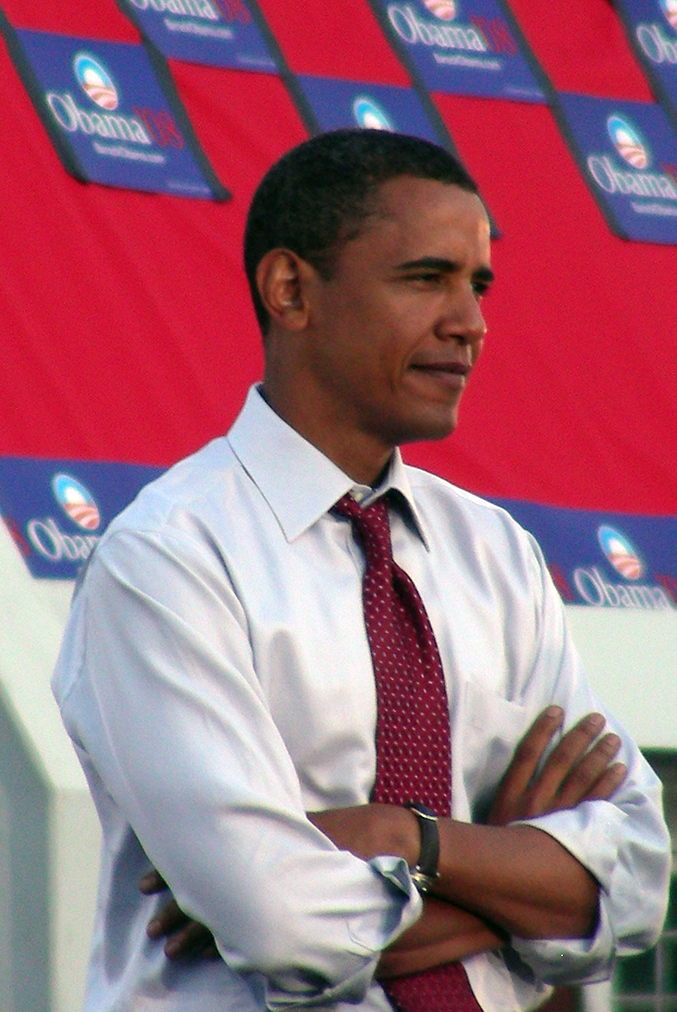
Barack Obama on the presidential campaign trail in 2007 during his first presidential campaign.

This is the electoral history of Barack Obama. Barack Obama served as the 44th president of the United States (2008–2016) and as a United States senator from Illinois (2005–2008).

A member of the Democratic Party, Obama was first elected to the Illinois Senate in 1997 representing the 13th district, which covered much of the Chicago South Side. In 2000, Obama ran an unsuccessful campaign for Illinois's 1st congressional district in the United States House of Representatives against four-term incumbent Bobby Rush. In 2004, Obama campaigned for the U.S. Senate, participating in the first Senate election in which both major party candidates were African American, with Alan Keyes running as the Republican candidate. Obama won the election, gaining a seat previously represented by Republican Peter Fitzgerald.

In 2008, Obama entered the Democratic primaries for the U.S. presidential election. Numerous candidates entered initially, but over time the field narrowed down to Obama and Senator Hillary Clinton from New York. The contest was highly competitive between the two, with neither being able to reach a majority of delegates without the addition of unpledged delegates. Eventually, Clinton ended her campaign and endorsed Obama for the nomination, prompting his victory. He went on to face Senator John McCain from Arizona as the Republican nominee, defeating him with 365 electoral votes to McCain's 173.

Obama sought re-election for a second term in 2012, running virtually unopposed in the Democratic primaries. His opponent in the general election was former governor of Massachusetts Mitt Romney. Obama won 332 electoral votes, defeating Romney who gained 206. After this election, he became the first president since Dwight D. Eisenhower to receive over 51% of the popular vote twice. (Note: George H. W. Bush and George W. Bush won majorities of the popular vote once each, while Bill Clinton never won a majority in the popular vote.)

== Illinois Senate elections (1997–2002) ==
=== 1997 ===
1997 Illinois Senate 13th district special election
Party	Candidate	Votes	%
Democratic	Barack Obama	48,592	82.16%
Harold Washington	David Whitehead	7,461	12.62%
Republican	Rosette Caldwell Peyton	3,091	5.23%
Total votes		59,144	100.00%
Democratic hold			

=== 1998 ===
1998 Illinois Senate 13th district election
Party	Candidate	Votes	%
Democratic	Barack Obama (incumbent)	45,486	89.17%
Republican	Yesse B. Yehudah	5,526	10.83%
Total votes		51,012	100.00%
Democratic hold			

=== 2002 ===
2002 Illinois Senate 13th district election
Party	Candidate	Votes	%
Democratic	Barack Obama (incumbent)	48,717	100.00%
Total votes		48,717	100.00%
Democratic hold			

== United States House of Representatives election (2000) ==
=== Primary election ===
2000 Illinois's 1st congressional district election, Democratic primary
Party	Candidate	Votes	%
Democratic	Bobby Rush (incumbent)	59,599	61.03%
Democratic	Barack Obama	29,649	30.36%
Democratic	Donne Trotter	6,915	7.08%
Democratic	George Roby	1,501	1.54%
Total votes		97,664	100.00%

== United States Senate election (2004) ==
=== Primary election ===
2004 United States Senate Democratic primary in Illinois
Party	Candidate	Votes	%
Democratic	Barack Obama	755,923	52.77%
Democratic	Dan Hynes	294,717	23.71%
Democratic	Blair Hull	134,453	10.82%
Democratic	Maria Pappas	74,987	6.03%
Democratic	Gery Chico	53,433	4.30%
Democratic	Nancy Skinner	16,098	1.30%
Democratic	Joyce Washington	13,375	1.08%
Write-in		10	0.00%
Total votes		1,242,996	100.00%

=== General election ===
County results of the 2004 senatorial election

2004 United States Senate election in Illinois
Party	Candidate	Votes	%
Democratic	Barack Obama	3,598,277	69.97%
Republican	Alan Keyes	1,391,030	27.05%
Independent	Albert J. Franzen	81,186	1.58%
Libertarian	Jerry Kohn	69,276	1.35%
Write-in		2,930	0.05%
Total votes		5,142,699	100.00%
Democratic gain from Republican			

== 2008 presidential election ==
=== Democratic presidential primaries ===
==== Popular vote ====
First-instance vote by state and territory Barack Obama (33) Hillary Clinton (23)

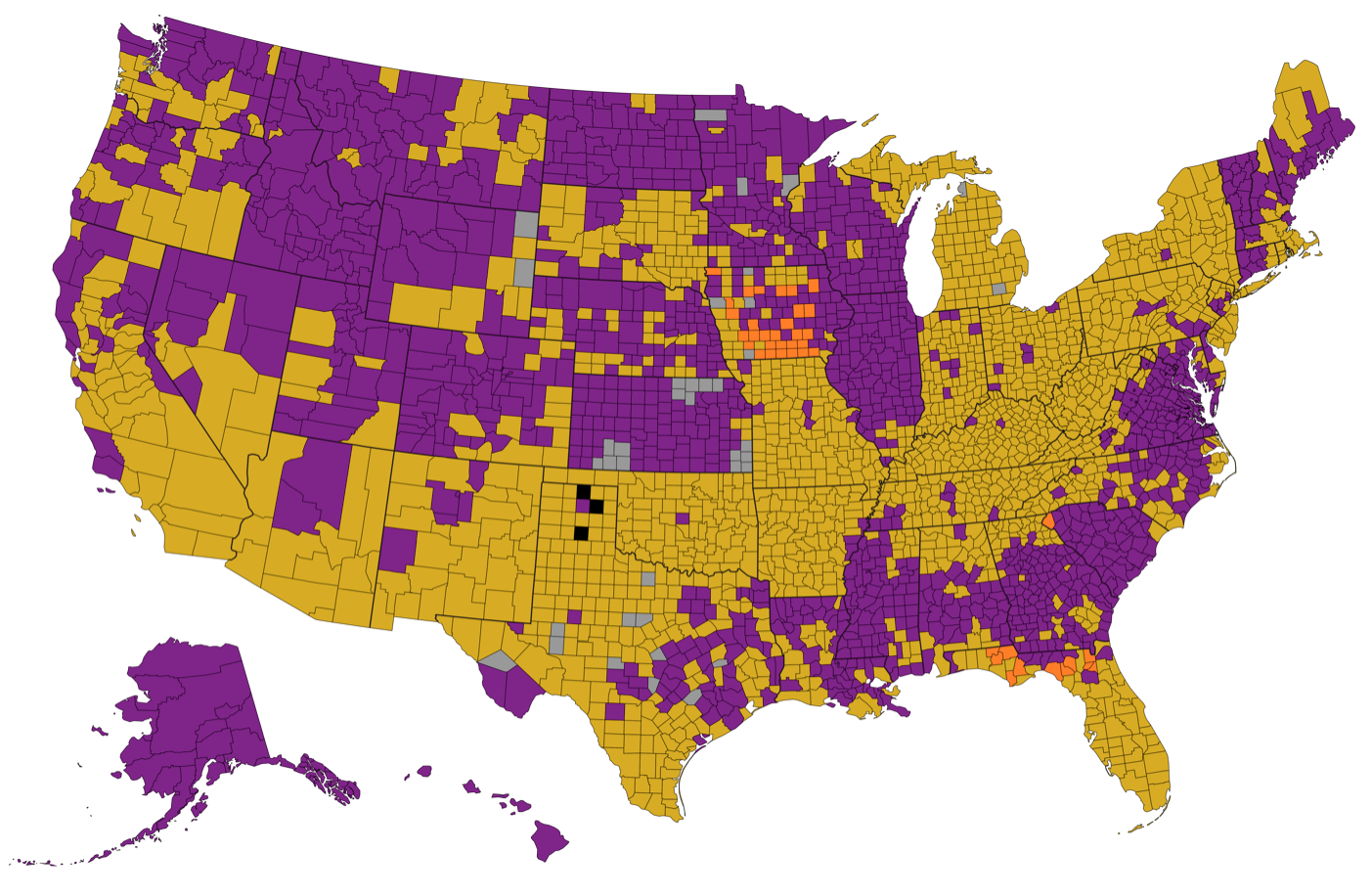
First-instance vote by county Barack Obama Hillary Clinton John Edwards Tie No results

Excluding penalized contests, (Note: Florida and Michigan violated Democratic National Committee rules by moving their primaries before February 5, 2008, resulting in a nullification of their primaries, until the DNC Rules and Bylaws Committee voted to restore half their delegates.) only primary and caucuses votes:

2008 Democratic presidential primaries
Candidate	Votes	%
Barack Obama	16,706,853	49.04%
Hillary Clinton	16,239,821	47.67%
John Edwards	742,010	2.18%
Bill Richardson	89,054	0.26%
Uncommitted	82,660	0.24%
Dennis Kucinich	68,482	0.20%
Joe Biden	64,041	0.19%
Mike Gravel	27,662	0.08%
Christopher Dodd	25,300	0.07%
Others	22,556	0.07%
Total votes	34,068,439	100.00%

Including penalized contests:

2008 Democratic presidential primaries
Candidate	Votes	%
Hillary Clinton	18,225,175	48.03%
Barack Obama	17,988,182	47.41%
John Edwards	1,006,275	2.65%
Uncommitted	299,610	2.79%
Bill Richardson	106,073	0.28%
Dennis Kucinich	103,994	0.27%
Joe Biden	81,641	0.22%
Scattering	44,348	0.12%
Mike Gravel	40,251	0.11%
Christopher Dodd	35,281	0.09%
Total votes	37,980,830	100.00%

==== Delegate counts ====
2008 Democratic Party presidential primaries
Candidate	Delegates		
Candidate	Pledged delegates	Superdelegates	Total delegates
Barack Obama	1,795	361	2,156
Hillary Clinton	1,637	285	1,922
John Edwards	4	2	6
Total	3,436	648	4,084
Needed to win			2,118

2008 Democratic National Convention (Presidential tally)

- Barack Obama - chosen by acclamation

Unfinished roll call (13 states, D.C. Guam, American Samoa and Democrats Abroad):

- Hillary Clinton - 1,011 (24.07%)

==== Other results ====
2008 New Hampshire Democratic vice presidential primary
Candidate	Votes	%
Raymond Stebbins	50,485	46.93%
William Bryk	22,965	21.35%
John Edwards	10,553	9.81%
Barack Obama	6,402	5.95%
Bill Richardson	5,525	5.14%
Hillary Clinton	3,419	3.18%
Joe Biden	1,512	1.41%
Al Gore	966	0.90%
Dennis Kucinich	762	0.71%
Bill Clinton	388	0.36%
John McCain	293	0.27%
Christopher Dodd	224	0.21%
Ron Paul	176	0.16%
Jack Barnes, Jr.	95	0.09%
Mike Gravel	91	0.09%
Joe Lieberman	67	0.06%
Mitt Romney	66	0.06%
Mike Huckabee	63	0.06%
Rudy Giuliani	46	0.04%
Darrel Hunter	20	0.02%
Total votes	104,118	100.00%

=== General election ===
Electoral College map of the 2008 presidential election

2008 United States presidential election
Candidate	Running mate	Party	Popular vote		Electoral vote	
Candidate	Running mate	Party	Votes	%	Votes	%
Barack Obama	Joe Biden	Democratic	69,498,516	52.91	365	67.84
John McCain	Sarah Palin	Republican	59,948,323	45.64	173	32.16
Ralph Nader	Matt Gonzalez	Independent	739,034	0.56		
Bob Barr	Wayne Allyn Root	Libertarian	523,715	0.40		
Chuck Baldwin	Darrell Castle	Constitution	199,750	0.15		
Cynthia McKinney	Rosa Clemente	Green	161,797	0.12		
Others			290,626	0.22		
Total			131,361,761	100.00	538	100.00

== 2012 Presidential election ==
=== General election ===
Electoral College map of the 2012 presidential election

2012 United States presidential election
Candidate	Running mate	Party	Popular vote		Electoral vote	
Candidate	Running mate	Party	Votes	%	Votes	%
Barack Obama (inc.)	Joe Biden (inc.)	Democratic	65,915,795	51.06	332	61.71
Mitt Romney	Paul Ryan	Republican	60,933,504	47.20	206	38.29
Gary Johnson	Jim Gray	Libertarian	1,275,971	0.99		
Jill Stein	Cheri Honkala	Green	469,627	0.36		
Others			490,513	0.38		
Total			129,085,410	100.00	538	100.00

== See also ==
- Obama coalition
- Electoral history of Joe Biden
- Electoral history of Hillary Clinton
- Electoral history of Sarah Palin
- Electoral history of John McCain
- Electoral history of John Edwards
- Electoral history of Kamala Harris
- Electoral history of Mitt Romney
