= John Flynt =

American politician

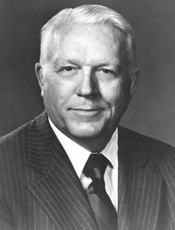

Member of the U.S. House of Representatives from Georgia
- In office November 2, 1954 – January 3, 1979
- Preceded by: A. Sidney Camp
- Succeeded by: Newt Gingrich
- Constituency: 4th district (1954–1965); 6th district (1965–1979)

Member of the Georgia House of Representatives
- In office 1947–1948

Personal details
- Born: John James Flynt Jr. November 8, 1914 Griffin, Georgia, U.S.
- Died: June 24, 2007 (aged 92) Griffin, Georgia, U.S.
- Party: Democratic

John James Flynt Jr. (November 8, 1914 – June 24, 2007) was an American Democratic Party politician who served in the United States House of Representatives for two congressional districts in Georgia from 1954 to 1979. Upon his retirement from the House, he was succeeded by future House Speaker Newt Gingrich, whom Flynt had narrowly defeated in the two previous elections.

== Early life and education ==
John James Walker Flynt Jr. was born on November 8, 1914, in Griffin, Georgia, the only son of John James Flynt and Susan Winn Banks Flynt. He attended Spalding County public schools, before enrolling in Georgia Military Academy. He then attended the University of Georgia at Athens where he was a member of the Phi Kappa Literary Society. After graduating with an A.B. degree in 1936. In 1936, he received his commission in the United States Army Reserves. Lt. Flynt was assigned to the 6th Horse Cavalry Regiment at Fort Oglethorpe, Georgia. He served from 1936 to 1937. In World War II, Flynt served as Aide-de-Camp for Brigadier General Robert W. Grow in the 3rd Armored Division in France and was awarded the Bronze Star Medal in 1944. In 1945, Flynt joined the U.S. Army Reserve, where he later retired a Colonel.

Flynt attended law schools at the University of Georgia, Emory University, and received an LLB from George Washington University Law School in 1940. He was a lawyer in private practice and was assistant United States attorney for northern district of Georgia from 1939 to 1941 and again in 1945 and 1946.

== Early political career ==
Flynt was a member of the Georgia House of Representatives 1947–1948, and was solicitor general for Griffin Judicial Circuit from 1949 to 1954. In 1952–1954, he was president of the Georgia Bar Association. Flynt was a delegate to the Georgia State Democratic conventions in 1946, 1950, 1954, 1958, 1962, and 1966, and was a delegate to the Democratic National Conventions of 1960 and 1968.

== Tenure in Congress ==
Flynt was elected as a Democrat to the Eighty-third Congress by special election to fill the vacancy caused by the death of Representative A. Sidney Camp, and at the same time was elected to the Eighty-fourth Congress. He was reelected to the eleven succeeding Congresses, serving from November 2, 1954, to January 3, 1979. While in Congress, he was chair of the Committee on Standards of Official Conduct (Ninety-fourth and Ninety-fifth Congresses).

Jack Flynt was the focus of two books by the political scientist, Richard Fenno: Home Style and Congress at the Grassroots. He was one of the most conservative Democrats in the House. Flynt cast votes against abortion, gun control, the Equal Rights Amendment, Medicare, and public housing. Flynt opposed reciprocal trade agreements fearing that they would hurt the textile industry in his district, and supported price support for agriculture. A staunch segregationist, in 1956, Flynt signed the Southern Manifesto. Flynt voted against the Civil Rights Acts of 1957, the Civil Rights Acts of 1960, the Civil Rights Acts of 1964, and the Civil Rights Acts of 1968 as well as the 24th Amendment to the U.S. Constitution and the Voting Rights Act of 1965.

Flynt was reelected nine times without serious difficulty, eight of those times unopposed. He faced a Republican only once during this time, in 1966. The Republican Party was more or less nonexistent in most of Georgia well into the 1970s.

However, in 1974, he was nearly defeated by political newcomer Newt Gingrich, a professor at the University of West Georgia. This came as a considerable surprise, as 1974 was a very bad year for Republicans nationally due to fallout from Watergate. After an equally close rematch against Gingrich in 1976 (despite former governor Jimmy Carter's bid for president), Flynt opted not to run for reelection in 1978, when his district was finally won by Gingrich. Gingrich's eventual success was largely due to changing demographics. By the early 1970s, the southern and western suburbs of Atlanta had begun spilling into the district, and gradually swamped the native-born farming and small-town population in the voting booth.

== Later years ==
After leaving Congress, Flynt resumed the practice of law and farming operations. He engaged in banking and real estate, and lived in Griffin, Georgia, until his death in 2007.

U.S. House of Representatives
Preceded by Albert Sidney Camp	Member of the U.S. House of Representatives from Georgia's 4th congressional district November 2, 1954 – January 3, 1965	Succeeded by James MacKay
Preceded by Carl Vinson	Member of the U.S. House of Representatives from Georgia's 6th congressional district January 3, 1965 – January 3, 1979	Succeeded by Newt Gingrich
