= Electoral history of Mike Johnson =

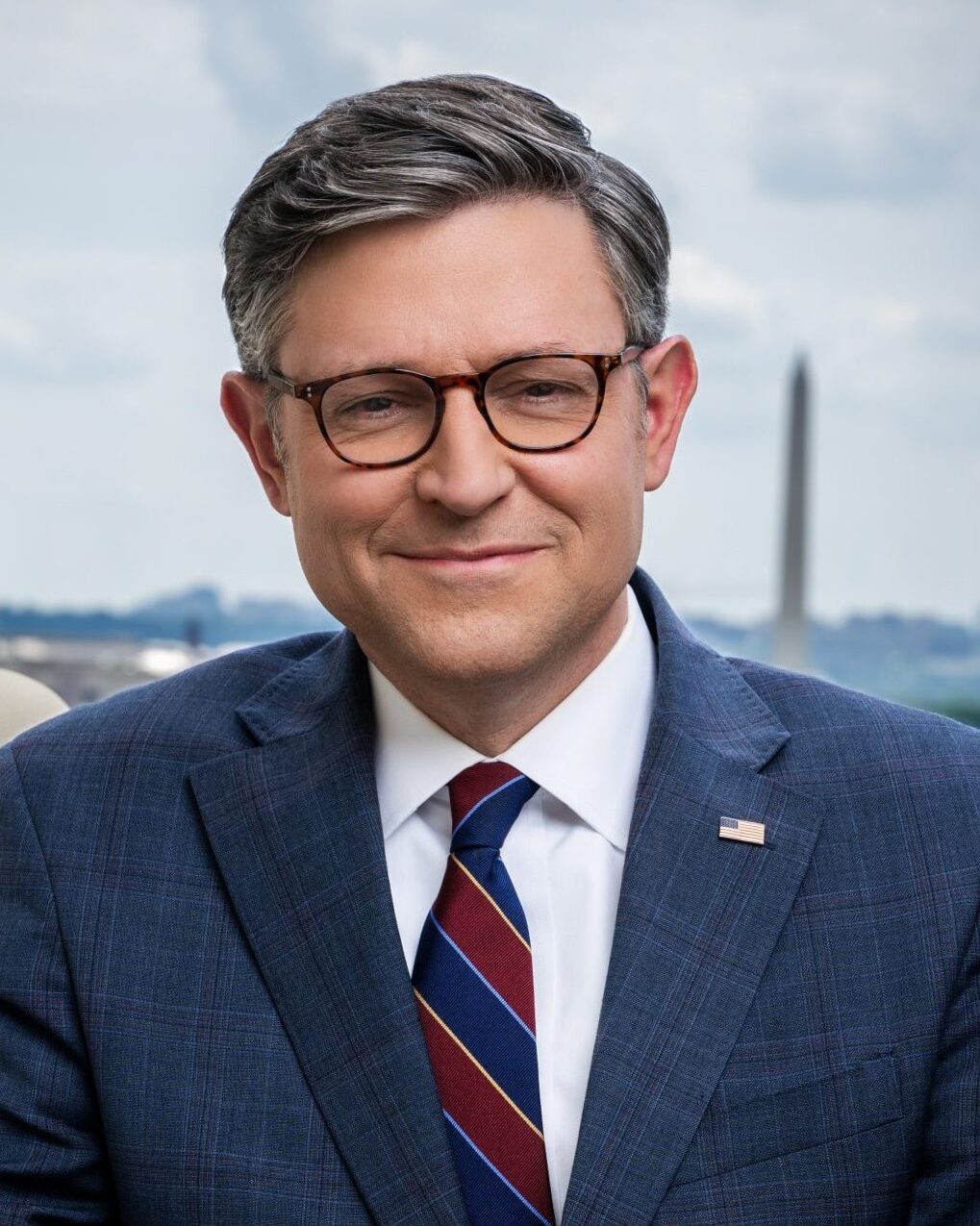
Johnson in 2024

This is the electoral history of Mike Johnson, who has served as a United States representative from Louisiana since 2017 and speaker of the U.S. House of Representatives since 2023. Johnson previously served in the Louisiana House of Representatives, representing the 8th district from 2015 to 2017. He was re-elected for a full term as house speaker on January 3, 2025.

== 2015 Louisiana House of Representatives 8th district Special election ==
2015 Louisiana House of Representatives 8th district election
Party	Candidate	Votes	%
Republican	Mike Johnson	Unopposed	
Total votes		N/A	100.0
Republican hold			

== 2015 Louisiana House of Representatives 8th district election ==
2015 Louisiana House of Representatives 8th district election
Party	Candidate	Votes	%
Republican	Mike Johnson	Unopposed	
Total votes		N/A	100.0
Republican hold			

== 2016 Louisiana's 4th congressional district election ==
Louisiana's 4th congressional district, 2016
Party	Candidate	Votes	%
Democratic	Marshall Jones	80,593	28.2
Republican	Mike Johnson	70,580	24.7
Republican	Trey Baucum	50,412	17.6
Republican	Oliver Jenkins	44,521	15.6
Republican	Elbert Guillory	21,017	7.4
Republican	Rick John	13,220	4.6
Independent	Mark Halverson	3,149	1.1
Independent	Kenneth Kreft	2,493	0.9
Total votes		285,985	100.0
Runoff election
Republican	Mike Johnson	87,370	65.2
Democratic	Marshall Jones	46,579	34.8
Total votes		133,949	100.0
Republican hold			

== 2018 Louisiana's 4th congressional district election ==
Louisiana's 4th congressional district, 2018
Party	Candidate	Votes	%
Republican	Mike Johnson (incumbent)	139,326	64.2
Democratic	Ryan Trundle	72,934	33.6
Independent	Mark David Halverson	4,612	2.1
Total votes		216,872	100.0
Republican hold			

== 2020 Louisiana's 4th congressional district election ==
Louisiana's 4th congressional district, 2020
Party	Candidate	Votes	%
Republican	Mike Johnson (incumbent)	185,265	60.4
Democratic	Kenny Houston	78,157	25.5
Democratic	Ryan Trundle	23,813	7.8
Republican	Ben Gibson	19,343	6.3
Total votes		306,578	100.0
Republican hold			

== 2022 Louisiana's 4th congressional district election ==
Louisiana's 4th congressional district, 2022
Party	Candidate	Votes	%
Republican	Mike Johnson (incumbent)	Unopposed	
Total votes		N/A	100.0
Republican hold			

== October 2023 Speaker of the United States House of Representatives election ==
October 2023 Speaker of the United States House of Representatives election
Party	Candidate	District	4th ballot October 25	
Party	Candidate	District	Votes	%
Republican	Mike Johnson	LA 4	220	51.3%
Democratic	Hakeem Jeffries	NY 8	209	48.7%
Total votes			429	100%
Absent			4	—N/a
Vacant			2	—N/a
Votes needed to win			215	>50%

== 2024 Louisiana's 4th congressional district election ==
Louisiana's 4th congressional district, 2024
Party	Candidate	Votes	%
Republican	Mike Johnson (incumbent)	262,821	85.8
Republican	Joshua Morott	43,427	14.2
Total votes		306,248	100.0
Republican hold			

== 2025 Speaker of the United States House of Representatives election ==
2025 Speaker of the United States House of Representatives election
Party	Candidate	Votes	%
Republican	Mike Johnson LA 4 (incumbent)	218	50.23
Democratic	Hakeem Jeffries (NY 8)	215	49.54
Republican	Tom Emmer (MN 6)	1	0.23
Total votes		434 (Note: One seat, that of Florida's 1st congressional district is vacant.)	100
Votes necessary		218	>50
