= Electoral history of Kamala Harris =

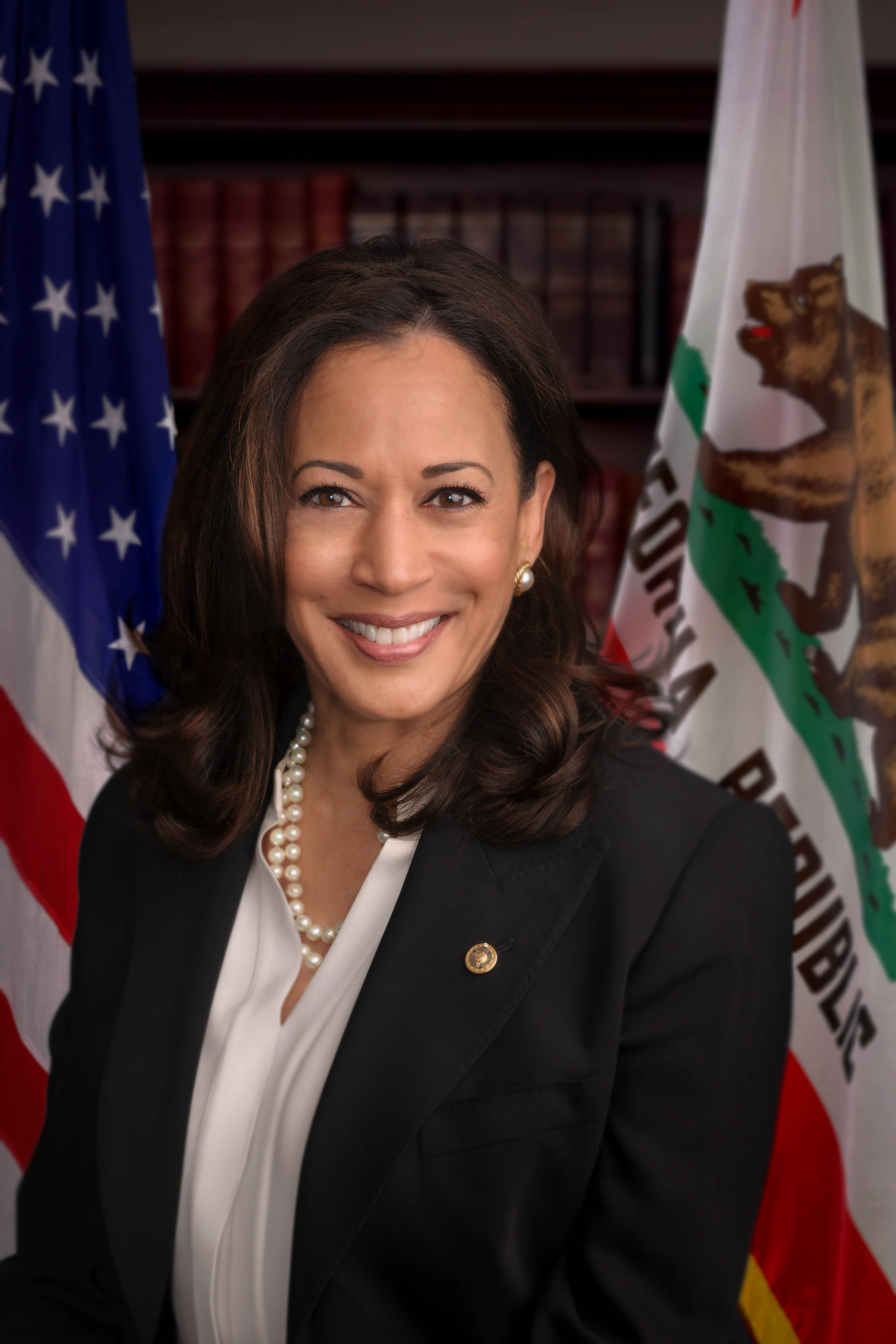
Official portrait, 2017

Kamala Harris, the 49th vice president of the United States (2021–2025), is a member of the Democratic Party, one of two major parties in the United States. She has run for public office seven times. Harris served as the 27th district attorney of San Francisco (2004–2011), the 32nd attorney general of California (2011–2017), and as a United States senator from California (2017–2021).

In 2003, Harris began her political career by challenging Terence Hallinan, the incumbent district attorney of San Francisco, and defeating him in a runoff election. In 2007, she won a second term unopposed. In 2010, she won a highly competitive Democratic primary for the party's nomination in the 2010 California Attorney General election. She defeated Republican nominee Steve Cooley in the general election. She was reelected in 2014 by defeating challenger Ronald Gold.

Harris was a candidate in the 2020 Democratic Party presidential primaries, but withdrew her candidacy on December 3, 2019, citing a lack of funds. On March 8, 2020, Harris endorsed former Vice President Joe Biden. On August 11, she was chosen by Biden to be his running mate. Biden and Harris went on to win the 2020 general election, defeating Republican incumbents Donald Trump and Mike Pence. On January 20, 2021, Harris became the first female vice president and the highest-ranking female official in United States history, as well as the first African-American and Asian-American vice president. In 2024, she and Biden ran for reelection. Following Biden's withdrawal from the race, Harris became the Democratic Party presidential nominee, running in the 2024 election alongside her Vice Presidential nominee, Minnesota Governor Tim Walz. They lost the general election to Trump and Ohio Senator JD Vance.

== San Francisco District Attorney elections (2003–2007) ==
=== 2003 ===
In 2003, Harris challenged Terence Hallinan, the two-term incumbent District Attorney of San Francisco. Harris finished second to Hallinan, but received more votes than Bill Fazio, who had run in 1995 and 1999. However, since no candidate received a majority, Harris and Hallinan advanced to a run-off election. She criticized Hallinan's relatively weak conviction rate. During the campaign, she stated that she would give herself a spending cap; despite this she exceeded it. Harris defeated Hallinan by a large margin, outperforming Gavin Newsom in the concurrent mayoral election.

2003 San Francisco District Attorney election
Party	Candidate	Votes	%
Nonpartisan	Terence Hallinan (incumbent)	70,580	35.9
Nonpartisan	Kamala Harris	66,248	33.7
Nonpartisan	Bill Fazio	59,834	30.4
Total votes		196,662	100.0

2003 San Francisco District Attorney runoff election
Party	Candidate	Votes	%
Nonpartisan	Kamala Harris	137,111	56.5
Nonpartisan	Terence Hallinan (incumbent)	105,617	43.5
Total votes		242,728	100.0

=== 2007 ===
Harris ran for reelection in 2007. She was unopposed and won the election with just over 98 percent of the vote. It was the first time since 1991 that the incumbent district attorney ran unopposed in San Francisco.

2007 San Francisco District Attorney election
Party	Candidate	Votes	%
Nonpartisan	Kamala Harris (incumbent)	114,561	98.5
Write-in		1,744	1.5
Total votes		116,305	100.0

== California Attorney General elections (2010–2014) ==
=== 2010 ===
In 2010, Harris ran to replace Jerry Brown, who was retiring to run for governor, as the attorney general of California. She won a highly competitive Democratic primary with around 30 percent of the vote. Harris received the endorsement of the Los Angeles Times and Los Angeles mayor Antonio Villaraigosa. All six major candidates participated in a debate at the Milken Institute in Santa Monica, California.

2010 California Attorney General Democratic primary election
Candidate	Votes	%
Kamala Harris	762,995	33.6
Alberto Torrico	354,792	15.6
Chris Kelly	350,757	15.5
Ted Lieu	237,618	10.5
Pedro Nava	222,941	9.7
Rocky Delgadillo	219,494	9.6
Mike Schmier	127,291	5.5
Total votes	2,275,888	100.0

County results map of the 2010 California Attorney General election.: Harris: 40–50% 50–60% 60–70% 70–80% / Cooley: 40–50% 50–60% 60–70%

In the general election, Harris faced Republican Steve Cooley, the Los Angeles County District Attorney. Early in the race, Harris trailed Cooley in polls. The two debated at the UC Davis School of Law in Davis, California. During the debate, Cooley gave a controversial answer to a question about his pension; he stated that if he won, he would accept a pension for both his role as LA County District Attorney and as California Attorney General, receiving over $400,000. The New York Times dubbed the answer "the 47 seconds that saved Kamala Harris’s political career". In 2024, during Harris's 2024 presidential campaign, Cooley, while being interviewed by ABC News, criticized her debating skill, saying "She needs her teleprompter. She needs her notes that are probably written by someone else in order to do well."

On Election Day, Cooley held a narrow lead and claimed that he had won the election. However, after all votes were counted, the race was called in favor of Harris by a margin of less than one percent. The race was one of the closest statewide elections in the history of California. She became the state's first female attorney general.

2010 California Attorney General election
Party	Candidate	Votes	%
Democratic	Kamala Harris	4,442,781	46.1
Republican	Steve Cooley	4,368,624	45.3
Green	Peter Allen	258,879	2.7
Libertarian	Timothy J. Hannan	246,583	2.6
American Independent	Diane Beall Templin	169,993	1.8
Peace and Freedom	Robert J. Evans	160,416	1.7
Total votes		9,647,276	100.0%
Democratic hold			

=== 2014 ===
Following the passage of Proposition 14 in 2010, California began using nonpartisan blanket primaries, where the top two candidates advance to the general election for most non-presidential elections, including attorney general. In early February 2014, Harris announced she would run for a second term as attorney general. Harris and Republican Ronald Gold received the most votes in the primary and advanced to the general election.

2014 California Attorney General primary election
Party	Candidate	Votes	%
Democratic	Kamala Harris (incumbent)	2,177,480	53.2
Republican	Ronald Gold	504,091	12.3
Republican	Phil Wyman	479,468	11.7
Republican	David King	368,190	9.0
Republican	John Haggerty	336,433	8.2
No party preference	Orly Taitz	130,451	3.2
Libertarian	Jonathan Jaech	99,056	2.4
Total votes		4,095,169	100.0

Map of county results from the 2014 California Attorney General election.: Harris: 50–60% 60–70% 70–80% 80–90% / Gold: 50–60% 60–70% 70–80%

In the campaign finance reports released at the end of July 2014, Harris reported millions of dollars in campaign funds, while Gold had raised less than $20,000 and was in debt. Donors to Harris's reelection bid included then-businessman and future political opponent Donald Trump. In the general election, Harris defeated Gold by fifteen percent and over a million votes.

2014 California Attorney General election
Party	Candidate	Votes	%
Democratic	Kamala Harris (incumbent)	4,102,649	57.5
Republican	Ronald Gold	3,033,476	42.5
Total votes		7,136,125	100.0%
Democratic hold			

== United States Senate election (2016) ==
=== Primary ===
On January 5, 2015, incumbent Democrat Barbara Boxer announced she would not seek a fifth term in the Senate. On January 13, Harris announced she planned to run for the open seat. In the primary election, Harris, who received just over 3 million votes, and Representative Loretta Sanchez of California's 46th congressional district, who received 1.4 million votes, advanced to the general election.

2016 United States Senate primary election in California
Party	Candidate	Votes	%
Democratic	Kamala Harris	3,000,689	39.9
Democratic	Loretta Sanchez	1,416,203	18.9
Republican	Duf Sundheim	584,251	7.8
Republican	Phil Wyman	352,821	4.7
Republican	Tom Del Beccaro	323,614	4.3
Republican	Greg Conlon	230,944	3.1
Democratic	Steve Stokes	168,805	2.2
Republican	George C. Yang	112,055	1.5
Republican	Karen Roseberry	110,557	1.5
Libertarian	Gail K. Lightfoot	99,761	1.3
Democratic	Massie Munroe	98,150	1.3
Green	Pamela Elizondo	95,677	1.3
Republican	Tom Palzer	93,263	1.2
Republican	Ron Unz	92,325	1.2
N/A	Other	733,207	9.76
Total votes		7,512,322	100.0%

=== General election ===
Map of county results from the 2016 California United States Senate election: Harris: 50–60% 60–70% / Sanchez: 50–60% 60–70%

Harris and Sanchez participated in a debate at University of California, Los Angeles. The election was not particularly competitive, with Politico's Will Kane characterizing the race as one of the "least-exciting races in California history." Due to Sanchez and Harris holding similar positions, Kane felt it was a poor implementation of the open primary system. On Election Day, Harris defeated Sanchez by 2.8 million votes and a margin of 23 percent.

2016 United States Senate election in California
Party	Candidate	Votes	%
Democratic	Kamala Harris	7,542,753	61.6%
Democratic	Loretta Sanchez	4,701,417	38.4%
Total votes		12,244,170	100.0%
Democratic hold			

== Presidential elections (2020–2024) ==
=== 2020 ===
==== Democratic primary ====
In January 2019, Harris announced her presidential bid; she was one of the first Democrats to launch a campaign. A total of 29 major candidates entered the primaries, the largest field of presidential candidates for any American political party since 1972. On December 3, Harris dropped out of the race, citing a lack of funding. Despite dropping out, she still appeared on the primary ballot in New Hampshire, where she received 129 votes, and Arkansas, where she received 715 votes, receiving a total of 844 votes. On March 8, 2020, Harris endorsed former Vice President Joe Biden's presidential bid.

==== Nomination ====
During the Democratic primary, Biden pledged to select a woman to be his running mate. After his victory, Harris, fellow Senators and 2020 Democratic presidential candidates Amy Klobuchar of Minnesota and Elizabeth Warren of Massachusetts, and activist Stacey Abrams were seen as the most likely candidates, with Harris and Warren as the favorites. On August 11, 2020, Biden announced he had selected Harris as his running mate. She became the third woman, after Geraldine Ferraro in 1984 and Sarah Palin in 2008, and the first person of color to be a major party vice-presidential nominee.

==== General election ====
Electoral college map of the 2020 election

In the general election, Biden and Harris faced Republican incumbents Donald Trump and Mike Pence. On October 7, Harris and Pence participated in a debate at the University of Utah. Multiple moments from the debate became internet memes, including a fly landing on Pence's head and Harris's response to being interrupted, "Mr. Vice President, I'm speaking". On Election Day, the Biden-Harris ticket defeated the Trump-Pence ticket with 306 electoral votes. They were the first Democrats to carry the states of Arizona and Georgia since the Clinton-Gore ticket in the 1990s. The Biden-Harris ticket received more than 81 million votes, the most ever cast for a candidate in the United States. Harris became the 49th vice president of the United States: the first woman to serve in the role.

2020 United States presidential election
Candidate	Running mate	Party	Popular vote		Electoral vote	
Candidate	Running mate	Party	Votes	%	Votes	%
Joe Biden	Kamala Harris	Democratic	81,268,924	51.31	306	56.88
Donald Trump (incumbent)	Mike Pence (incumbent)	Republican	74,216,154	46.86	232	43.12
Jo Jorgensen	Spike Cohen	Libertarian	1,865,724	1.18	0	0.00
Howie Hawkins	Angela Nicole Walker	Green	405,035	0.26	0	0.00
Others			628,584	0.40	0	0.00
Total			158,384,421	100.00	538	100.00

=== 2024 ===
==== Nomination ====
On April 25, 2023, Biden announced that both he and Harris would seek a second term in the 2024 United States presidential election. Biden easily won the 2024 Democratic Party presidential primaries with minimal opposition from Congressman Dean Phillips. However, following his performance in the first 2024 presidential debate, various prominent Democrats, including then-Senate majority leader Chuck Schumer and former Speaker of the House Nancy Pelosi, called for Biden to exit the race. On July 21, 2024, Biden withdrew from the race and immediately endorsed Harris to replace him as the party's presidential nominee.

Harris considered various politicians to be her running mate, with the most widely reported candidates being Governors Andy Beshear of Kentucky, Roy Cooper of North Carolina, Josh Shapiro of Pennsylvania, and Tim Walz of Minnesota, as well as Senator Mark Kelly of Arizona. Illinois Governor JB Pritzker and Secretary of Transportation and 2020 Democratic presidential candidate Pete Buttigieg also received media attention as possible options. In her book, 107 Days, Harris revealed she heavily considered Buttigieg. In early August, Harris became the party's presumptive nominee. On August 6, at a rally in Pennsylvania, Harris revealed Walz as her running mate. Walz and Harris were formally nominated at the 2024 Democratic National Convention on August 21 and 22, respectively.

==== General election ====
Electoral college map of the 2024 election

In the general election, Harris and Walz faced the Republican ticket of Trump and Ohio Senator JD Vance. On September 10, 2024, Harris and Trump participated in a debate in Philadelphia, Pennsylvania at the National Constitution Center. On Election Day, Harris lost all seven swing states and performed poorly in several traditionally Democratic states compared with Biden's performance in 2020; Trump improved on his 2020 margin in all fifty states and Washington, D.C.

2024 United States presidential election
Candidate	Running mate	Party	Popular vote		Electoral vote	
Candidate	Running mate	Party	Votes	%	Votes	%
Donald Trump	JD Vance	Republican	77,304,296	49.70	312	57.99
Kamala Harris	Tim Walz	Democratic	75,019,682	48.23	226	42.01
Jill Stein	Butch Ware	Green	881,909	0.57	0	0.00
Robert F. Kennedy Jr.	Nicole Shanahan	Independent	757,369	0.49	0	0.00
Chase Oliver	Michael ter Maat	Libertarian	650,139	0.42	0	0.00
Write-ins			480,431	0.31	0	0.00
Others			459,016	0.30	0	0.00
Total			155,552,842	100.00	538	100.00
