= Electoral history of George H. W. Bush =

Elections featuring President of the US

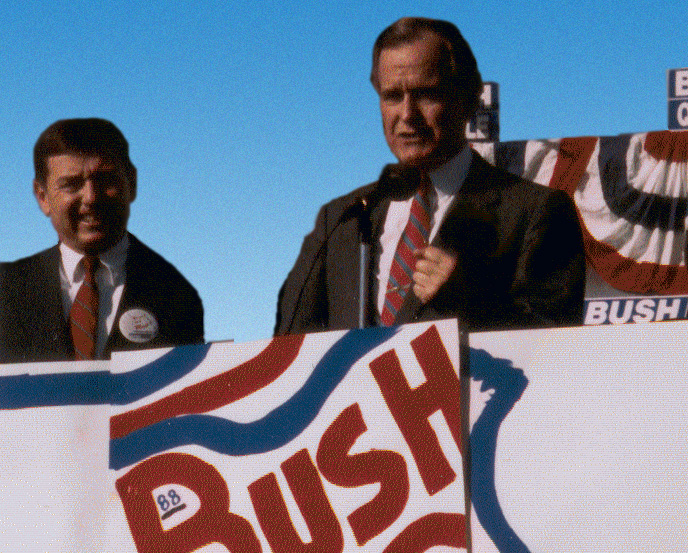
President George H. W. Bush in 1988

George Herbert Walker Bush served as the 41st president of the United States (1989–1993), the 43rd vice president (1981–1989), the 11th director of central intelligence (1976–1977), and as a United States representative from Texas (1967–1971).

== Congressional elections (1964–1970) ==
=== 1964 ===
1964 United States Senate election in Texas, Republican primary
Party	Candidate	Votes	%
Republican	George H. W. Bush	62,985	44.08%
Republican	Jack Cox	45,561	31.89%
Republican	Robert J. Morris	28,279	19.79%
Republican	Milton Davis	6,067	4.25%
Total votes		142,892	100.00%

1964 United States Senate election in Texas, Republican primary runoff
Party	Candidate	Votes	%
Republican	George H. W. Bush	49,751	62.12%
Republican	Jack Cox	30,333	37.88%
Total votes		80,084	100.00%

1964 United States Senate election in Texas
Party	Candidate	Votes	%
Democratic	Ralph Yarborough (incumbent)	1,463,958	56.22%
Republican	George H. W. Bush	1,134,337	43.56%
Constitution	Jack Carswell	5,542	0.21%
Total votes		2,603,837	100.00%

=== 1966 ===
1966 Texas's 7th congressional district election
Party	Candidate	Votes	%
Republican	George H. W. Bush	53,756	57.07%
Democratic	Frank Briscoe	39,958	42.42%
Constitution	Bob Gray	488	0.52%
Total votes		94,202	100.00%

=== 1968 ===
1968 Texas's 7th congressional district election
Party	Candidate	Votes	%
Republican	George H. W. Bush (incumbent)	110,455	100.00%
Total votes		110,455	100.00%

=== 1970 ===
1970 United States Senate election in Texas, Republican primary
Party	Candidate	Votes	%
Republican	George H. W. Bush	96,806	87.64%
Republican	Robert J. Morris	13,654	12.36%
Total votes		110,460	100.00%

1970 United States Senate election in Texas
Party	Candidate	Votes	%
Democratic	Lloyd Bentsen	1,194,069	53.55%
Republican	George H. W. Bush	1,035,794	46.45%
Total votes		2,229,863	100.00%

== Presidential elections (1980–1992) ==
=== 1980 ===
First-instance vote by state

1980 Republican Party presidential primaries
Party	Candidate	Votes	%
Republican	Ronald Reagan	7,709,793	59.79%
Republican	George H. W. Bush	3,070,033	23.81%
Republican	John B. Anderson	1,572,174	12.19%
Republican	Howard Baker	181,153	1.41%
Republican	Phil Crane	97,793	0.76%
Republican	John Connally	82,625	0.64%
Republican	Uncommitted	68,155	0.53%
Republican	Ben Fernandez	25,520	0.20%
Republican	Harold Stassen	25,425	0.20%
Republican	Gerald Ford	10,557	0.08%
Republican	Bob Dole	7,204	0.06%
Republican	Others	33,217	0.26%
Total votes		12,883,649	100.00%

1980 Republican National Convention, Presidential tally
Party	Candidate	Votes	%
Republican	Ronald Reagan	1,939	97.44%
Republican	John B. Anderson	37	1.86%
Republican	George H. W. Bush	13	0.65%
Republican	Anne Armstrong	1	0.05%
Total votes		1,990	100.00%

1980 Republican National Convention, Vice Presidential tally
Party	Candidate	Votes	%
Republican	George H. W. Bush	1,832	93.33%
Republican	Jesse Helms	54	2.75%
Republican	Jack Kemp	42	2.14%
Republican	Phil Crane	23	1.17%
Republican	James R. Thompson	5	0.26%
Republican	John M. Ashbrook	1	0.05%
Republican	Howard Baker	1	0.05%
Republican	Henry J. Hyde	1	0.05%
Republican	Donald Rumsfeld	1	0.05%
Republican	Eugene Schroeder	1	0.05%
Republican	William E. Simon	1	0.05%
Republican	Guy Vander Jagt	1	0.05%
Total votes		1,963	100.00%

Electoral college results of the 1980 election Reagan: 489 votes (44 states) Carter: 49 votes (6 states + DC)

1980 United States presidential election
Party	Candidate	Votes	%
Republican	Ronald Reagan / George H. W. Bush	43,903,230	50.75%
Democratic	Jimmy Carter / Walter Mondale (incumbent)	35,480,115	41.01%
Independent	John B. Anderson / Patrick Joseph Lucey	5,719,850	6.61%
Libertarian	Ed Clark / David H. Koch	921,128	1.06%
Citizens	Barry Commoner / LaDonna Harris	233,052	0.27%
Communist	Gus Hall / Angela Davis	44,933	0.05%
American Independent	John Rarick / Eileen Shearer	40,906	0.05%
N/A	Others	166,464	0.19%
Total votes		86,509,678	100.00%

=== 1984 ===
1984 Republican National Convention, Vice Presidential tally
Party	Candidate	Votes	%
Republican	George H. W. Bush (incumbent)	2,231	99.82%
Republican	(abstention)	2	0.09%
Republican	Jack Kemp	1	0.05%
Republican	Jeane Kirkpatrick	1	0.05%
Total votes		2,235	100.00%

Electoral college results of the 1984 election Reagan: 525 votes (49 states) Mondale: 13 votes (1 state + DC)

1984 United States presidential election
Party	Candidate	Votes	%
Republican	Ronald Reagan (incumbent) / George H. W. Bush (incumbent)	54,455,472	58.77%
Democratic	Walter Mondale / Geraldine Ferraro	37,577,352	40.56%
Libertarian	David Bergland / Jim Lewis	228,111	0.25%
Independent	Lyndon LaRouche / Billy Davis	78,809	0.09%
Citizens	Sonia Johnson / Richard Walton	72,161	0.08%
Populist	Bob Richards / Maureen Salaman	66,324	0.07%
New Alliance	Dennis L. Serrette / Nancy Ross	46,853	0.05%
Workers World	Larry Holmes / Gloria La Riva	46,853	0.05%
N/A	Others	112,266	0.12%
Total votes		92,653,233	100.00%

=== 1988 ===
First-instance vote by state George H. W. Bush Bob Dole Pat Robertson

1988 Republican Party presidential primaries
Party	Candidate	Votes	%
Republican	George H. W. Bush	8,258,512	67.91%
Republican	Bob Dole	2,333,375	19.19%
Republican	Pat Robertson	1,097,446	9.02%
Republican	Jack Kemp	331,333	2.72%
Republican	Uncommitted	56,990	0.47%
Republican	Pierre S. du Pont, IV	49,783	0.41%
Republican	Alexander M. Haig	26,619	0.22%
Republican	Harold Stassen	2,682	0.02%
Total votes		12,156,740	100.00%

1988 Republican National Convention, Presidential tally
Party	Candidate	Votes	%
Republican	George H. W. Bush	2,277	100.00%
Total votes		2,277	100.00%

Electoral college results of the 1988 election Bush: 426 votes (40 states) Dukakis: 111 votes (10 states + DC) Bentsen: 1 vote (faithless elector)

1988 United States presidential election
Party	Candidate	Votes	%
Republican	George H. W. Bush / Dan Quayle	48,886,597	53.37%
Democratic	Michael Dukakis / Lloyd Bentsen	41,809,476	45.65%
Libertarian	Ron Paul / Andre Marrou	431,750	0.47%
New Alliance	Lenora Fulani / Joyce Dattner	217,221	0.24%
N/A	Others	249,642	0.27%
Total votes		91,594,686	100.00%

=== 1992 ===
1992 Republican Party presidential primaries
Party	Candidate	Votes	%
Republican	George H. W. Bush (incumbent)	9,199,463	72.84%
Republican	Pat Buchanan	2,899,488	22.96%
Republican	Uncommitted	287,383	2.28%
Republican	David Duke	119,115	0.94%
Republican	Ross Perot	56,136	0.44%
Republican	Pat Paulsen	10,984	0.09%
Republican	Maurice Horton	9,637	0.08%
Republican	Harold Stassen	8,099	0.06%
Total votes		3,390,842	100.00%

1992 Republican National Convention, Presidential tally
Party	Candidate	Votes	%
Republican	George H. W. Bush (incumbent)	2,189	99.05%
Republican	Pat Buchanan	18	0.81%
Republican	Howard Phillips	2	0.09%
Republican	Alan Keyes	1	0.05%
Total votes		2,210	100.00%

1992 New York State Right to Life Party Convention
Party	Candidate	Votes	%
Right to Life	George H. W. Bush (incumbent)	unopposed	100.00%

Electoral college results of the 1992 election Clinton: 370 votes (32 states + DC) Bush: 168 votes (18 states)

1992 United States presidential election
Party	Candidate	Votes	%
Democratic	Bill Clinton / Al Gore	44,909,889	43.01%
Republican	George H. W. Bush (incumbent)/ Dan Quayle (incumbent)	39,104,550	37.45%
Independent	Ross Perot / James Stockdale	19,743,821	18.91%
Libertarian	Andre Marrou / Nancy Lord	290,087	0.28%
Populist	Bo Gritz / Cyril Minett	106,152	0.10%
New Alliance	Lenora Fulani / Maria Elizabeth Muñoz	73,622	0.07%
N/A	Others	195,885	18.76%
Total votes		104,423,923	100.00%

== See also ==
- Electoral history of Kamala Harris
- Electoral history of Al Gore
- Electoral history of Bill Clinton
- Electoral history of Bob Dole
- Electoral history of Dan Quayle
- Electoral history of Dick Cheney
- Electoral history of George W. Bush
- Electoral history of Jimmy Carter
- Electoral history of Ronald Reagan
- Electoral history of Walter Mondale
