= Electoral history of Jimmy Carter =

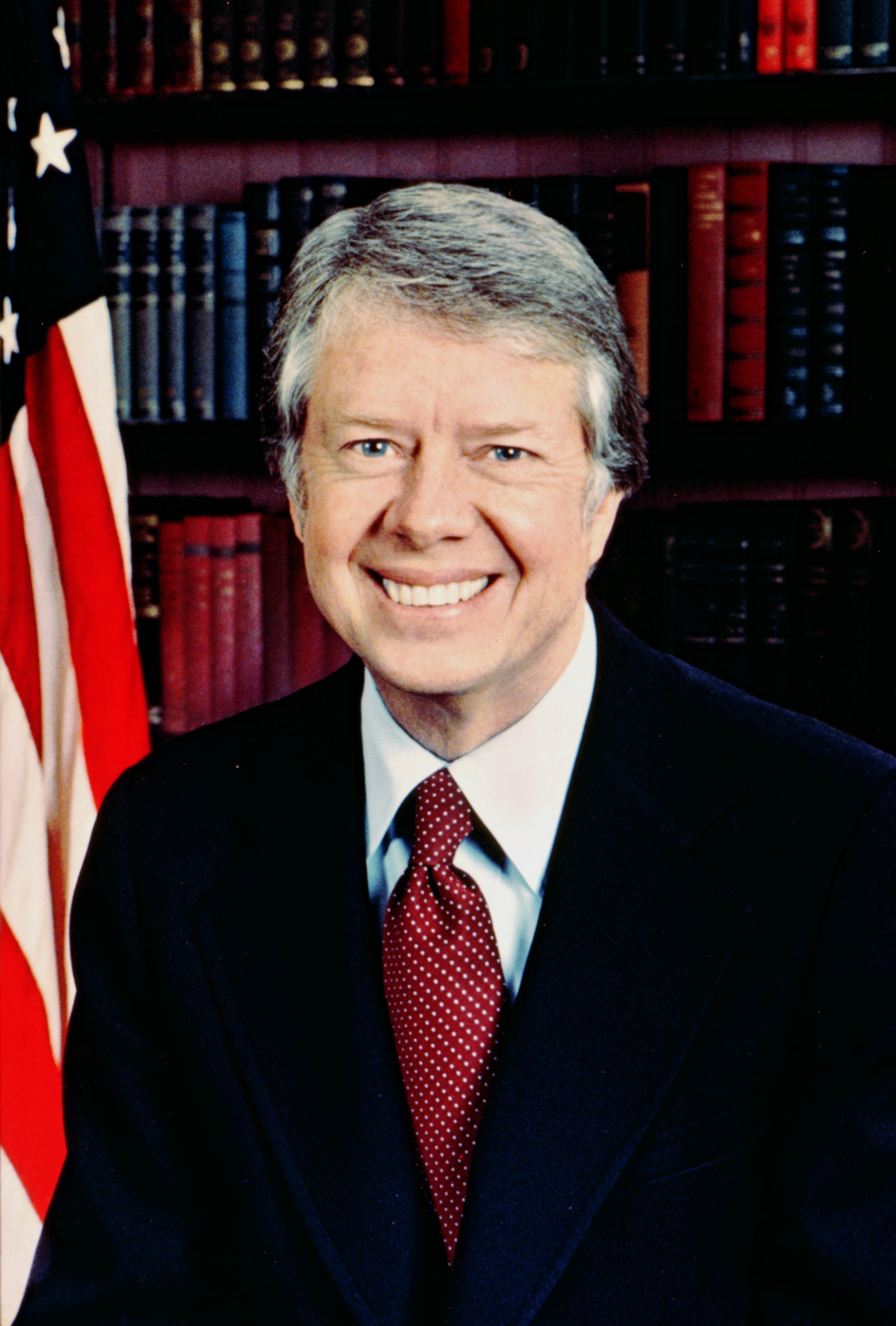
President Jimmy Carter, 1977

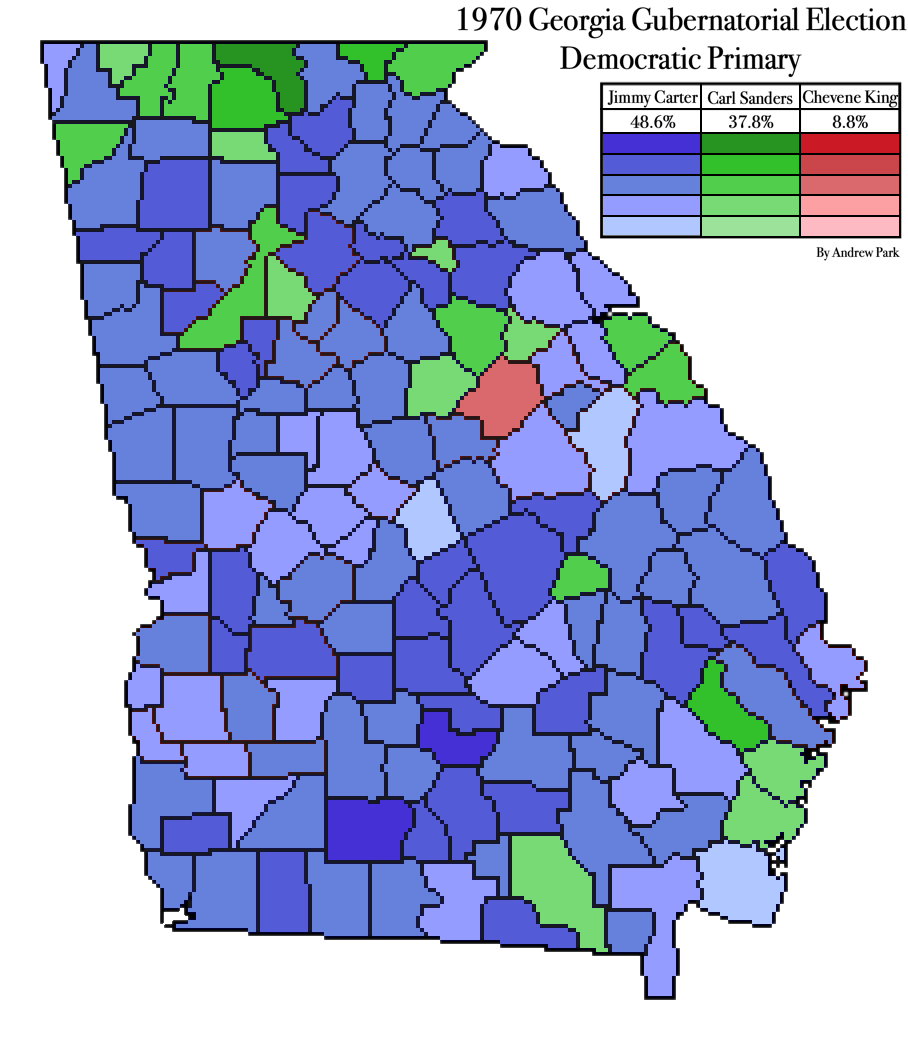
1970 Georgia Democratic Gubernatorial Primary

This is the electoral history of Jimmy Carter. Jimmy Carter served as the 39th president of the United States (1977–1981) and the 76th governor of Georgia (1971–1975).

Georgia 14th State Senate District Democratic Primary, 1962

- Jimmy Carter - 3,013
- Homer Moore - 2,182

Georgia Democratic gubernatorial primary, 1966

- Ellis Arnall - 231,480 (29.38%)
- Lester Maddox - 185,672 (23.56%)
- Jimmy Carter - 164,562 (20.89%)
- James H. Gray - 152,973 (19.41%)
- Garland T. Byrd - 39,994 (5.08%)
- Hoke O'Kelley - 13,271 (1.68%)

Georgia Democratic gubernatorial primary, 1970

- Jimmy Carter - 388,280 (48.62%)
- Carl E. Sanders - 301,659 (37.77%)
- Chevene King - 70,424 (8.82%)
- J. B. Stoner - 17,663 (2.21%)
- 1970 Georgia gubernatorial election
  McKee Hargett - 9,440 (1.18%)
- Thomas J. Irvin - 4,184 (0.52%)
- Adam B. Matthews - 3,332 (0.42%)

Georgia Democratic gubernatorial primary runoff, 1970

- Jimmy Carter - 506,462 (59.42%)
- Carl E. Sanders - 345,906 (40.58%)

1970 Georgia gubernatorial election

- Jimmy Carter (D) - 620,419 (59.28%)
- Hal Suit (R) - 424,983 (40.60%)
- Write-ins - 1,261 (0.12%)

1972 Democratic National Convention (Vice Presidential tally)

- Thomas Eagleton - 1,742 (59.07%)
- Frances Farenthold - 405 (13.73%)
- Mike Gravel - 226 (7.66%)
- Endicott Peabody - 108 (3.66%)
- Clay Smothers - 74 (2.51%)
- Birch Bayh - 62 (2.10%)
- Peter Rodino - 57 (1.93%)
- Jimmy Carter - 30 (1.02%)
- Shirley Chisholm - 20 (0.68%)
- Moon Landrieu - 19 (0.64%)
- Edward T. Breathitt - 18 (0.61%)
- Ted Kennedy - 15 (0.51%)
- Fred R. Harris - 14 (0.48%)
- Richard G. Hatcher - 11 (0.37%)
- Harold E. Hughes - 10 (0.34%)
- Joseph M. Montoya - 9 (0.31%)
- William L. Guy - 8 (0.27%)
- Adlai Stevenson III - 8 (0.27%)
- Robert Bergland - 5 (0.17%)
- Hodding Carter - 5 (0.17%)
- Cesar Chavez - 5 (0.17%)
- Wilbur Mills - 5 (0.17%)
- Wendell Anderson - 4 (0.14%)
- Stanley Arnold - 4 (0.14%)
- Ron Dellums - 4 (0.14%)
- John J. Houlihan - 4 (0.14%)
- Roberto A. Mondragon - 4 (0.14%)
- Reubin O'Donovan Askew - 3 (0.10%)
- Herman Badillo - 3 (0.10%)
- Eugene McCarthy - 3 (0.10%)
- Claiborne Pell - 3 (0.10%)
- Terry Sanford - 3 (0.10%)
- Ramsey Clark - 2 (0.07%)
- Richard J. Daley - 2 (0.07%)
- John DeCarlo - 2 (0.07%)
- Ernest Gruening - 2 (0.07%)
- Roger Mudd - 2 (0.07%)
- Edmund Muskie - 2 (0.07%)
- Claude Pepper - 2 (0.07%)
- Abraham Ribicoff - 2 (0.07%)
- Pat Taylor - 2 (0.07%)
- Leonard F. Woodcock - 2 (0.07%)
- Bruno Agnoli - 2 (0.07%)
- Ernest Albright - 1 (0.03%)
- William A. Barrett - 1 (0.03%)
- Daniel Berrigan - 1 (0.03%)
- Phillip Berrigan - 1 (0.03%)
- Julian Bond - 1 (0.03%)
- Hargrove Bowles - 1 (0.03%)
- Archibald Burton - 1 (0.03%)
- Phillip Burton - 1 (0.03%)
- William Chappell - 1 (0.03%)
- Lawton Chiles - 1 (0.03%)
- Frank Church - 1 (0.03%)
- Robert Drinan - 1 (0.03%)
- Nick Galifianakis - 1 (0.03%)
- John Goodrich - 1 (0.03%)
- Michael Griffin - 1 (0.03%)
- Martha Griffiths - 1 (0.03%)
- Charles Hamilton - 1 (0.03%)
- Patricia Harris - 1 (0.03%)
- Jim Hunt - 1 (0.03%)
- Daniel Inouye - 1 (0.03%)
- Henry M. Jackson - 1 (0.03%)
- Robery Kariss - 1 (0.03%)
- Allard K. Lowenstein - 1 (0.03%)
- Mao Zedong - 1 (0.03%)
- Eleanor McGovern - 1 (0.03%)
- Martha Mitchell - 1 (0.03%)
- Ralph Nader - 1 (0.03%)
- George Norcross - 1 (0.03%)
- Jerry Rubin - 1 (0.03%)
- Fred Seaman - 1 (0.03%)
- Joe Smith - 1 (0.03%)
- Benjamin Spock - 1 (0.03%)
- Patrick Tavolacci - 1 (0.03%)
- George Wallace - 1 (0.03%)

1976 Democratic presidential primaries

Democratic Party presidential primaries

- Jimmy Carter - 6,235,609 (39.27%)
- Jerry Brown - 2,449,374 (15.43%)
- George Wallace - 1,955,388 (12.31%)
- Mo Udall - 1,611,754 (10.15%)
- Henry M. Jackson - 1,134,375 (7.14%)
- Frank Church - 830,818 (5.23%)
- Robert Byrd - 340,309 (2.14%)
- Sargent Shriver - 304,399 (1.92%)
- Unpledged - 283,437 (1.79%)
- Ellen McCormack - 238,027 (1.50%)
- Fred R. Harris - 234,568 (1.48%)
- Milton Shapp - 88,254 (0.56%)
- Birch Bayh - 86,438 (0.54%)
- Hubert Humphrey - 61,992 (0.39%)
- Ted Kennedy - 19,805 (0.13%)
- Lloyd Bentsen - 4,046 (0.03%)
- Terry Sanford - 404 (0.00%)

1976 Democratic National Convention (Presidential tally)

- Jimmy Carter - 2,239 (74.48%)
- Mo Udall - 330 (10.98%)
- Jerry Brown - 301 (10.01%)
- George Wallace - 57 (1.90%)
- Ellen McCormack - 22 (0.73%)
- Frank Church - 19 (0.63%)
- Hubert Humphrey - 10 (0.33%)
- Henry M. Jackson - 10 (0.33%)
- Fred R. Harris - 9 (0.30%)
- Milton Shapp - 2 (0.07%)
- Robert Byrd, Cesar Chavez, Leon Jaworski, Barbara Jordan, Ted Kennedy, Jennings Randolph, Fred Stover - each 1 vote (0.03%)

1976 United States presidential election

1976 United States presidential election

- Jimmy Carter/Walter Mondale (D) - 40,831,881 (50.1%) and 297 electoral votes (23 states and D.C. carried)
- Gerald Ford/Bob Dole (R) - 39,148,634 (48.0%) and 240 electoral votes (27 states carried)
- Ronald Reagan/Bob Dole (R) - 1 electoral vote (faithless elector)
- Eugene McCarthy (Independent) - 740,460 (0.9%)
- Roger MacBride/David Bergland (Libertarian) - 172,553 (0.2%)
- Lester Maddox/William Dyke (American Independent) - 170,274 (0.2%)
- Thomas J. Anderson/Rufus Shackelford (American) - 158,271 (0.2%)
- Peter Camejo/Willie Mae Reid (Socialist Workers) - 90,986 (0.1%)

1980 Democratic Party presidential primaries

- United States Democratic presidential primaries 1980
  Jimmy Carter (inc.) - 10,043,016 (51.13%)
- Ted Kennedy - 7,381,693 (37.58%)
- Unpledged - 1,288,423 (6.56%)
- Jerry Brown - 575,296 (2.93%)
- Lyndon LaRouche - 177,784 (0.91%)
- Cliff Finch - 48,032 (0.25%)

1980 Democratic National Convention (Presidential tally)

- Jimmy Carter (inc.) - 2,123 (64.04%)
- Ted Kennedy - 1,151 (34.72%)
- William Proxmire - 10 (0.30%)
- Koryne Kaneski Horbal - 5 (0.15%)
- Scott M. Matheson - 5 (0.15%)
- Ron Dellums - 3 (0.09%)
- Robert Byrd - 2 (0.06%)
- John Culver - 2 (0.06%)
- Kent Hance - 2 (0.06%)
- Jennings Randolph - 2 (0.06%)
- Warren Spannaus - 2 (0.06%)
- Alice Tripp - 2 (0.06%)
- Jerry Brown - 1 (0.03%)
- Dale Bumpers - 1 (0.03%)
- Hugh L. Carey - 1 (0.03%)
- Walter Mondale - 1 (0.03%)
- Edmund Muskie - 1 (0.03%)
- Thomas J. Steed - 1 (0.03%)

New York Liberal Party presidential convention, 1980

- John B. Anderson - 85,590 (87.67%)
- Jimmy Carter - 9,896 (10.14%)
- 1980 United States presidential election
  Abstaining - 2,142 (2.19%)

1980 United States presidential election

- Ronald Reagan/George H. W. Bush (R) - 43,903,230 (50.7%) and 489 electoral votes (44 states carried)
- Jimmy Carter/Walter Mondale (D) (inc.) - 35,480,115 (41.0%) and 49 electoral votes (6 states and D.C. carried)
- John B. Anderson/Patrick Joseph Lucey (Independent) - 5,719,850 (6.6%)
- Ed Clark/David H. Koch (Libertarian) - 921,128 (1.1%)
- Barry Commoner/LaDonna Harris (Citizens) - 233,052 (0.3%)
- Others - 252,303 (0.3%)

== See also ==
- Electoral history of Richard Nixon
- Electoral history of Ronald Reagan
- Electoral history of George H. W. Bush
- Electoral history of Bill Clinton
- Electoral history of Al Gore
- Electoral history of George W. Bush
- Electoral history of Joe Biden
- Electoral history of Kamala Harris
