= Electoral history of George Bush =

Electoral history of George Bush may refer to:

- Electoral history of George H. W. Bush, 41st president of the United States (1989–1993)
- Electoral history of George W. Bush, 43rd president of the United States (2001–2009)
- Electoral history of George P. Bush, 28th land commissioner of Texas (since 2015)
