= Electoral history of George W. Bush =

Elections featuring President of the US

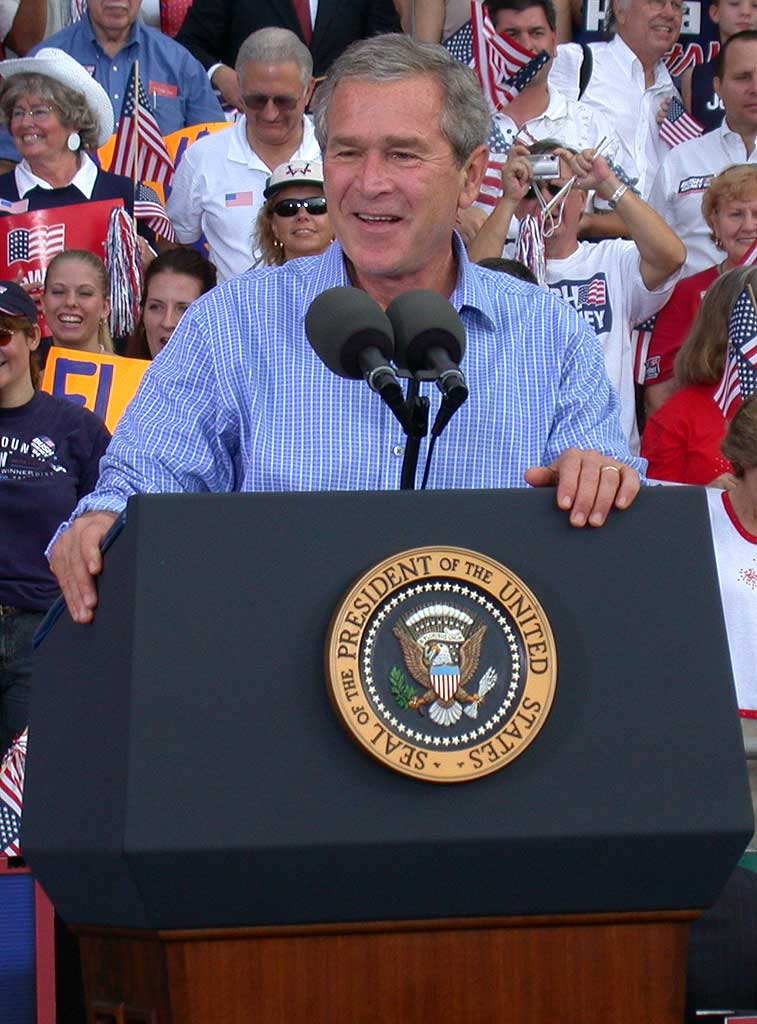
President George W. Bush

This is the electoral history of George W. Bush. George W. Bush served as the 43rd president of the United States (2001–2009) and as the 46th governor of Texas (1995–2000).

== 1978 congressional election ==
1978 Texas's 19th congressional district election, Republican primary
Party	Candidate	Votes	%
Republican	George W. Bush	6,296	47.52%
Republican	Jim Reese	5,498	41.50%
Republican	Joe Hickox	1,455	10.98%
Total votes		13,249	100.00%

1978 Texas's 19th congressional district election, Republican primary runoff
Party	Candidate	Votes	%
Republican	George W. Bush	6,802	55.77%
Republican	Jim Reese	5,395	44.23%
Total votes		12,197	100.00%

1978 Texas's 19th congressional district election
Party	Candidate	Votes	%
Democratic	Kent Hance	54,729	53.24%
Republican	George W. Bush	48,070	46.76%
Total votes		102,799	100.00%

== 1994 Texas gubernatorial election ==
1994 Texas gubernatorial election, Republican primary
Party	Candidate	Votes	%
Republican	George W. Bush	520,130	93.32%
Republican	Ray Hollis	37,210	6.68%
Total votes		557,340	100.00%

1994 Texas gubernatorial election
Party	Candidate	Votes	%
Republican	George W. Bush	2,350,994	53.48%
Democratic	Ann Richards (incumbent)	2,016,928	45.88%
Libertarian	Keary Ehlers	28,320	0.64%
Total votes		4,396,242	100.00%

== 1998 Texas gubernatorial election ==
1998 Texas gubernatorial election, Republican primary
Party	Candidate	Votes	%
Republican	George W. Bush (incumbent)	576,528	96.60%
Republican	R.C. Crawford	20,311	3.40%
Total votes		596,839	100.00%

1998 Texas gubernatorial election
Party	Candidate	Votes	%
Republican	George W. Bush (incumbent)	2,550,821	68.24%
Democratic	Garry Mauro	1,165,592	31.18%
Libertarian	Lester Turlington	20,711	0.55%
Independent	Susan Lee Solar (write-in)	954	0.03%
Total votes		3,738,078	100.00%

== 2000 United States presidential election ==
Electoral college map of the 2000 United States presidential election

Electoral results
Presidential candidate	Party	Home state	Popular vote		Electoral vote	Running mate		
Presidential candidate	Party	Home state	Count	Percentage	Electoral vote	Vice-presidential candidate	Home state	Electoral vote
George W. Bush	Republican	Texas	50,456,002	47.87%	271	Dick Cheney	Wyoming	271
Al Gore	Democratic	Tennessee	50,999,897	48.38%	266	Joe Lieberman	Connecticut	266
Ralph Nader	Green	Connecticut	2,882,955	2.74%	0	Winona LaDuke	Minnesota	0
Pat Buchanan	Reform	Virginia	448,895	0.43%	0	Ezola B. Foster	California	0
Harry Browne	Libertarian	Tennessee	384,431	0.36%	0	Art Olivier	California	0
Howard Phillips	Constitution	Virginia	98,020	0.09%	0	Curtis Frazier	Missouri	0
John Hagelin	Natural Law	Iowa	83,714	0.08%	0	Nat Goldhaber	California	0
Other			51,186	0.05%	—	Other		—
(abstention) (Note: One faithless elector from the District of Columbia, Barbara Lett-Simmons, abstained from voting in protest of the District's lack of voting representation in the United States Congress. (D.C. has a non-voting delegate to Congress.) She had been expected to vote for Gore/Lieberman.)	—	—	—	—	1	(abstention)	—	1
Total			105,421,423	100%	538			538
Needed to win					270			270

Source: "2000 Presidential Electoral and Popular Vote" (Excel 4.0). Federal Election Commission.

=== Republican presidential primaries (2000) ===
First-instance vote by state George W. Bush (43) John McCain (7)

==== Popular vote ====
2000 Republican Party presidential primaries
Candidate	Votes	%
George W. Bush	12,034,676	62.00%
John McCain	6,061,332	31.23%
Alan Keyes	985,819	5.08%
Steve Forbes	171,860	0.89%
Unpledged	61,246	0.32%
Gary Bauer	60,709	0.31%
Orrin Hatch	15,958	0.08%
Al Gore (write-in)	1,155	0.01%
Bill Bradley (write-in)	1,025	0.01%
Total votes	19,393,780	100.00%

==== Delegate count ====
2000 Republican Party presidential primaries
Candidate	Delegates
George W. Bush	1,496
John McCain	244
Alan Keys	22
Total	1,762
Needed to win	882

== 2004 United States presidential election ==
Electoral college map of the 2004 United States presidential election

Electoral results
Presidential candidate	Party	Home state	Popular vote		Electoral vote	Running mate		
Presidential candidate	Party	Home state	Count	Percentage	Electoral vote	Vice-presidential candidate	Home state	Electoral vote
George Walker Bush	Republican	Texas	62,040,610	50.73%	286	Richard Bruce Cheney	Wyoming	286
John Forbes Kerry	Democratic	Massachusetts	59,028,444	48.27%	251	John Reid Edwards	North Carolina	251
John Edwards (Note: One faithless elector from Minnesota cast an electoral vote for John Edwards (written as John Ewards) for president.)	Democratic	North Carolina			1	John Reid Edwards	North Carolina	1
Ralph Nader	Independent	Connecticut	465,650	0.38%	0	Peter Camejo	California	0
Michael Badnarik	Libertarian	Texas	397,265	0.32%	0	Richard Campagna	Iowa	0
Michael Peroutka	Constitution	Maryland	143,630	0.12%	0	Chuck Baldwin	Florida	0
David Cobb	Green	Texas	119,859	0.10%	0	Pat LaMarche	Maine	0
Leonard Peltier	Peace and Freedom	Pennsylvania	27,607	0.02%	0	Janice Jordan	California	0
Walt Brown	Socialist	Oregon	10,837	0.01%	0	Mary Alice Herbert	Vermont	0
Róger Calero (Note: Because Arrin Hawkins, then aged 28, was constitutionally ineligible to serve as vice president, Margaret Trowe replaced her on the ballot in some states. James Harris replaced Calero on certain other states' ballots.)	Socialist Workers	New York	3,689	0.01%	0	Arrin Hawkins	Minnesota	0
Thomas Harens	Christian Freedom	Minnesota	2,387	0.002%	0	Jennifer Ryan	Minnesota	0
Other			50,652	0.04%	—	Other		—
Total			122,295,345	100%	538			538
Needed to win					270			270

Source (Electoral and Popular Vote): Federal Elections Commission Electoral and Popular Vote Summary

== See also ==
- Electoral history of George H. W. Bush
- Electoral history of Dick Cheney
- Electoral history of Al Gore
- Electoral history of John Kerry
- Electoral history of Bill Clinton
- Electoral history of Barack Obama
- Electoral history of John McCain
- Electoral history of Mitt Romney
- Electoral history of Donald Trump
- Electoral history of Kamala Harris
