= Electoral history of Bob Dole =

Elections featuring American politician

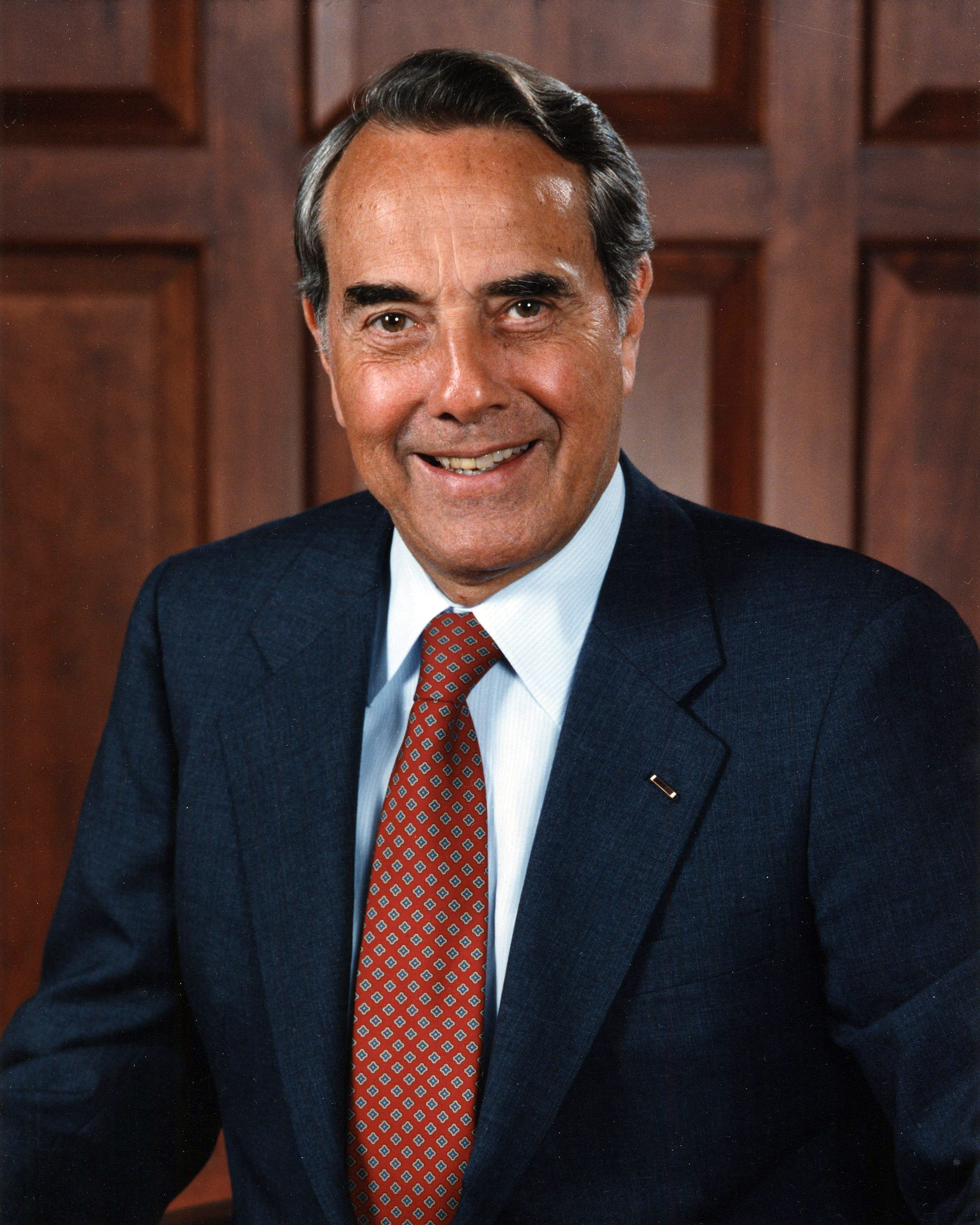
Robert J. Dole

Electoral history of Bob Dole, United States Senator from Kansas (1969–1996), Senate Majority Leader (1985–1987, 1995–1996), Senate Minority Leader (1987–1995), 1976 Republican Party vice presidential nominee and 1996 presidential nominee.

He had been involved in many elections on regional, statewide and nationwide stage, from 1950 to 1996.

Kansas House of Representatives, 81st district, 1950
Party	Candidate	Votes	%
Republican	Bob Dole	2,576	58.3%
Democratic	Elmo Mahoney (incumbent)	1,803	41.2%

Russell County Attorney, Republican Primary, 1952
Party	Candidate	Votes	%
Republican	Bob Dole	1,133	54.4%
Republican	Dean Ostrum	948	45.6%

Russell County Attorney 1952
Party	Candidate	Votes	%
Republican	Bob Dole	4,207	67.1%
Democratic	George Holland	2,065	32.9%

Russell County Attorney, 1954
Party	Candidate	Votes	%
Republican	Bob Dole (incumbent)	4,207	100%

Russell County Attorney, 1956
Party	Candidate	Votes	%
Republican	Bob Dole (incumbent)	3,175	57.8%
Democratic	Clifford Holland Jr.	2,317	42.2%

Russell County Attorney, 1958
Party	Candidate	Votes	%
Republican	Bob Dole (incumbent)	2,807	56.1%
Democratic	Robert Earnest	2,195	43.9%

Kansas's 6th congressional district, 1960, Republican Primary
Party	Candidate	Votes	%
Republican	Bob Dole	16,033	45.2%
Republican	Keith Sebelius	15,051	42.4%
Republican	Phillip J. Doyle	4,423	12.5%

Kansas's 6th congressional district, 1960
Party	Candidate	Votes	%
Republican	Bob Dole	62,335	59.3%
Democratic	Robert Earnest	42,869	40.8%

Kansas's 1st congressional district, 1962
Party	Candidate	Votes	%
Republican	Bob Dole (incumbent)	102,499	51.2%
Democratic	J. Floyd Breeding (incumbent)	81,092	44.2%

NOTE: Dole was an incumbent in abolished 6th district and Breeding in 1st district, which became merged into one.

Kansas's 1st congressional district, 1964
Party	Candidate	Votes	%
Republican	Bob Dole (incumbent)	113,212	51.2%
Democratic	Bill Bork	108,086	48.8%

Kansas's 1st congressional district, 1966
Party	Candidate	Votes	%
Republican	Bob Dole (incumbent)	97,487	68.6%
Democratic	Berniece Hencle	44,569	31.4%

United States Senate Election in Kansas, 1968, Republican Primary
Party	Candidate	Votes	%
Republican	Bob Dole	190,782	68.5%
Republican	William H. Avery	87,801	31.5%

United States Senate Election in Kansas, 1968
Party	Candidate	Votes	%
Republican	Bob Dole	490,911	60.1%
Democratic	William I. Robinson	315,911	38.7%
Prohibition	Joseph Fred Hyskell	10,262	1.3%
Write-in	Write-in	12	0%

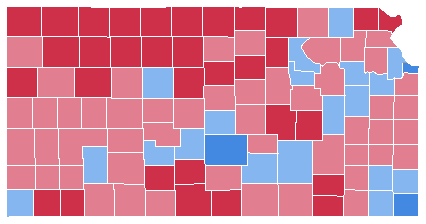
1974 US Senate election in Kansas

United States Senate Election in Kansas, 1974
Party	Candidate	Votes	%
Republican	Bob Dole (incumbent)	403,983	50.9%
Democratic	William R. Roy	390,451	49.2%

1976 Republican National Convention (Vice Presidential tally):

- Bob Dole - 1,921 (85.04%)
- Abstaining - 103 (4.56%)
- Jesse Helms - 103 (4.56%)
- Ronald Reagan - 27 (1.20%)
- Phil Crane - 23 (1.02%)
- John Grady - 19 (0.84%)
- Louis Frey - 9 (0.40%)
- Anne Armstrong - 6 (0.27%)
- Howard Baker - 6 (0.27%)
- William F. Buckley - 4 (0.18%)
- John B. Connally - 4 (0.18%)
- David C. Treen - 4 (0.18%)
- Alan Steelman - 3 (0.13%)
- Edmund Bauman - 2 (0.09%)
- Bill Brock - 2 (0.09%)
- Paul Laxalt - 2 (0.09%)
- Elliot Richardson - 2 (0.09%)
- Richard Schweiker - 2 (0.09%)
- William E. Simon - 2 (0.09%)
- Jack Wellborn - 2 (0.09%)
- James Allen - 1 (0.04%)
- Ray Barnhardt - 1 (0.04%)
- George H. W. Bush - 1 (0.04%)
- Pete Domenici - 1 (0.04%)
- James B. Edwards - 1 (0.04%)
- Frank S. Glenn - 1 (0.04%)
- David Keane - 1 (0.04%)
- James McClure - 1 (0.04%)
- Nancy Palm - 1 (0.04%)
- Donald Rumsfeld - 1 (0.04%)
- John W. Sears - 1 (0.04%)
- Roger Staubach - 1 (0.04%)
- Steve Symms - 1 (0.04%)

1976 presidential elections

1976 United States Presidential Election
Party	Candidate	Votes	%
Democratic	Jimmy Carter/Walter Mondale	40,831,881	50.1%
Republican	Gerald Ford (incumbent)/Bob Dole	39,148,634	48%
Republican	Ronald Reagan/Richard Schweiker	0	0%
Independent	Eugene McCarthy	740,460	0.9%
Libertarian	Roger MacBride/David Bergland	172,553	0.2%
American Independent	Lester Maddox/William Dyke	170,274	0.2%
Socialist Workers	Peter Camejo/Willie Mae Reid	90,986	0.1%

NOTE: One Faithless Elector voted for Reagan instead of Ford, but did cast vice-presidential vote for Dole.

1980 Republican presidential primaries:

- Ronald Reagan - 7,709,793 (59.79%)
- George H. W. Bush - 3,070,033 (23.81%)
- John B. Anderson - 1,572,174 (12.19%)
- Howard Baker - 181,153 (1.41%)
- Phil Crane - 97,793 (0.76%)
- John B. Connally - 82,625 (0.64%)
- Unpledged - 68,155 (0.53%)
- Ben Fernandez - 68,155 (0.53%)
- Harold Stassen - 25,425 (0.20%)
- Gerald Ford - 10,557 (0.08%)
- Bob Dole - 7,204 (0.06%)

United States Senate Election in Kansas, 1980, Republican Primary
Party	Candidate	Votes	%
Republican	Bob Dole (incumbent)	201,484	81.9%
Republican	Jim H. Grainge	44,674	18.2%

United States Senate Election in Kansas, 1980
Party	Candidate	Votes	%
Republican	Bob Dole (incumbent)	598,686	63.8%
Democratic	John Simpson	340,271	36.2%

Senate Majority Leader, 1984:

Final fourth ballot:

- Bob Dole - 28
- Ted Stevens - 25

Other defeated candidates: Pete Domenici, Dick Lugar, Jim McClure

United States Senate Election in Kansas, 1986, Republican Primary
Party	Candidate	Votes	%
Republican	Bob Dole (incumbent)	228,301	84.4%
Republican	Shirley J.A. Landis	42,237	15.6%

United States Senate Election in Kansas, 1986
Party	Candidate	Votes	%
Republican	Bob Dole (incumbent)	576,902	70.1%
Democratic	Guy MacDonald	246,664	30%

Iowa Republican presidential Straw Poll, 1987:

- Pat Robertson - 1,293 (33.65%)
- Bob Dole - 958 (24.93%)
- George H. W. Bush - 864 (22.48%)
- Jack Kemp - 520 (13.53%)
- Pierre S. du Pont, IV - 160 (4.16%)
- Ben Fernandez - 23 (0.60%)
- Kate Heslop - 13 (0.34%)
- Alexander Haig - 12 (0.31%)

1988 Republican primaries by state results George H. W. Bush Bob Dole Pat Robertson

1988 Republican presidential primaries:

- George H. W. Bush - 8,258,512 (67.91%)
- Bob Dole - 2,333,375 (19.19%)
- Pat Robertson - 1,097,446 (9.02%)
- Jack Kemp - 331,333 (2.72%)
- Unpledged - 56,990 (0.47%)
- Pierre S. du Pont, IV - 49,783 (0.41%)
- Alexander Haig - 26,619 (0.22%)
- Harold Stassen - 2,682 (0.02%)

United States Senate Election in Kansas, 1992, Republican Primary
Party	Candidate	Votes	%
Republican	Bob Dole (incumbent)	244,480	80.4%
Republican	Rode Rodewald	59,589	19.6%

United States Senate Election in Kansas, 1992
Party	Candidate	Votes	%
Republican	Bob Dole (incumbent)	706,246	62.7%
Democratic	Gloria O'Dell	349,525	31%
Independent	Christina Campbell-Cline	45,423	4%
Libertarian	Mark B. Kirk	25,253	2.24%

Iowa Republican presidential Straw Poll, 1995:

- Bob Dole - 2,582 (24.38%)
- Phil Gramm - 2,582 (24.38%)
- Pat Buchanan - 1,922 (18.15%)
- Lamar Alexander - 1,156 (10.91%)
- Alan Keyes - 804 (7.59%)
- Morry Taylor - 803 (7.58%)
- Richard Lugar - 466 (4.40%)
- Pete Wilson - 123 (1.16%)
- Bob Dornan - 87 (0.82%)
- Arlen Specter - 67 (0.63%)

1996 New Hampshire Republican Vice Presidential primary:

All candidates were running as write-in

- Colin Powell - 6,414 (25.80%)
- Alan Keres - 4,200 (16.90%)
- Scattering - 2,631 (10.58%)
- Lamar Alexander - 2,113 (8.50%)
- Richard Lugar - 1,881 (7.57%)
- Phil Gramm - 1,314 (5.29%)
- Steve Forbes - 1,220 (4.91%)
- Pat Buchanan - 1,115 (4.49%)
- Jack Kemp - 970 (3.90%)
- Bob Dole - 930 (3.74%)
- Morry Taylor - 710 (2.86%)
- Al Gore (inc.) - 654 (2.63%)
- Bob Dornan - 401 (1.61%)
- Ross Perot - 108 (0.43%)
- Bill Clinton - 70 (0.28%)
- Ralph Nader - 69 (0.28%)
- Richard P. Bosa - 60 (0.24%)

Washington Presidential primary for independent voters, 1996:

- Bill Clinton (D) (inc.) - 227,120 (51.08%)
- Bob Dole (R) - 125,154 (28.15%)
- Pat Buchanan (R) - 44,027 (9.90%)
- Steve Forbes (R) - 28,618 (6.44%)
- Alan Keyes (R) - 6,631 (1.49%)
- Lamar Alexander (R) - 5,181 (1.17%)
- Lyndon LaRouche (D) - 3,160 (0.71%)
- Richard Lugar (R) - 2,009 (0.45%)
- Phil Gramm (R) - 1,665 (0.37%)
- Bob Dornan (R) - 1,054 (0.24%)

1996 Republican presidential primaries

- Bob Dole - 9,024,742 (58.82%)
- Pat Buchanan - 3,184,943 (20.76%)
- Steve Forbes - 1,751,187 (11.41%)
- Lamar Alexander - 495,590 (3.23%)
- Alan Keyes - 471,716 (3.08%)
- Richard Lugar - 127,111 (0.83%)
- Unpledged delegates - 123,278 (0.80%)
- Phil Gramm - 71,456 (0.47%)
- Bob Dornan - 42,140 (0.28%)
- Morry Taylor - 21,180 (0.14%)
- Others - 18,261 (0.12%)

1996 Republican National Convention (Presidential tally):

- Bob Dole - 1,928 (97.62%)
- Pat Buchanan - 43 (2.18%)
- Phil Gramm - 2 (0.10%)
- Robert Bork - 1 (0.05%)
- Alan Keyes - 1 (0.05%)

1996 Presidential election

1996 United States Presidential Election
Party	Candidate	Votes	%
Democratic	Bill Clinton/Al Gore (incumbent)	47,402,357	49.2%
Republican	Bob Dole/Jack Kemp	39,198,755	40.7%
Reform	Ross Perot/Pat Choate	8,085,402	8.4%
Green	Ralph Nader/Multiple People	685,297	0.7%
Libertarian	Harry Browne/Jo Jorgensen	485,798	0.5%
Constitution	Howard Phillips/Herbert Titus	184,820	0.2%
Natural Law	John Hagelin/Michael Tompkins	113,670	0.1%
None	Others	121,534	0.1%
