= Electoral history of Dick Cheney =

Elections featuring US Vice President

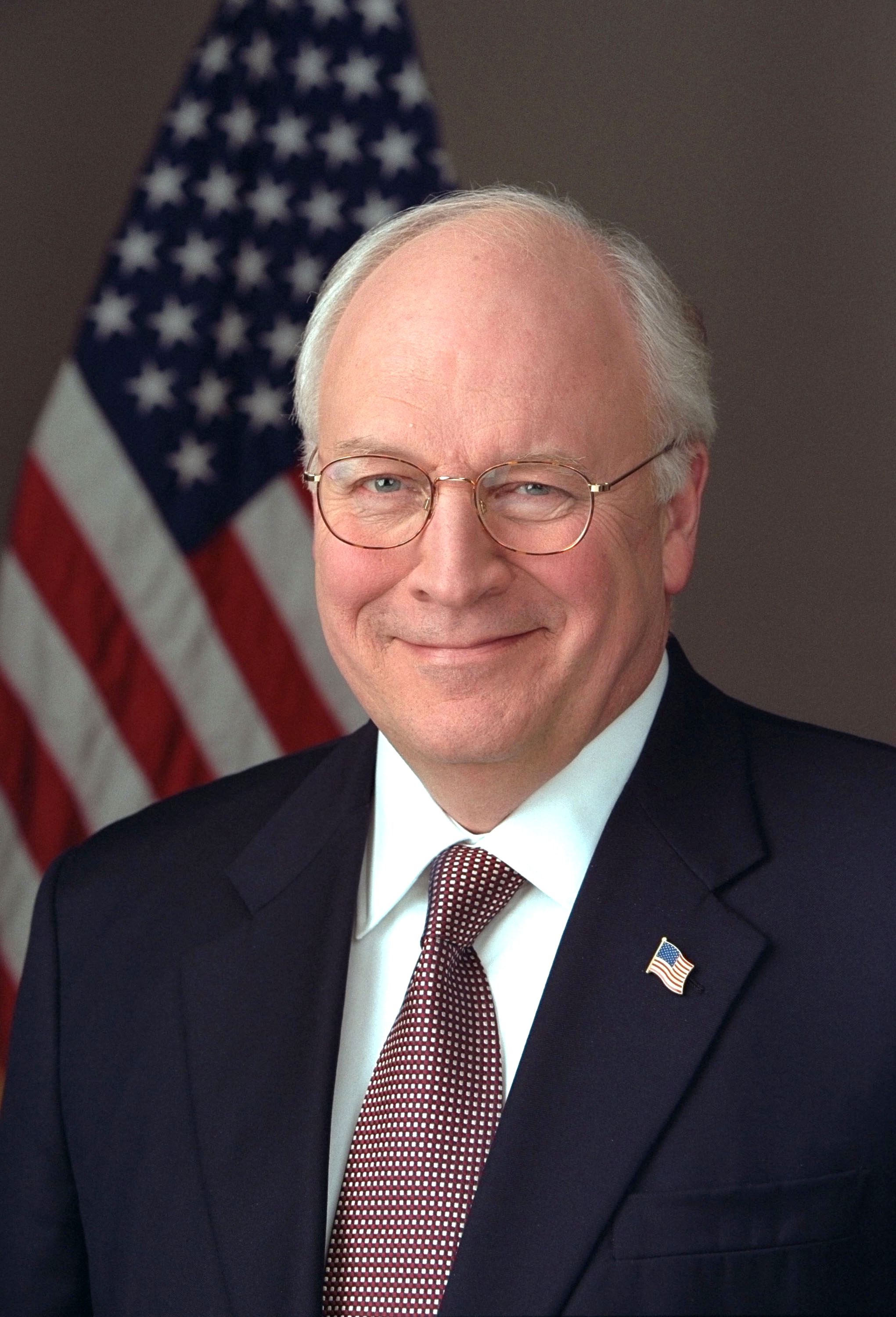
Official portrait, 2003

Dick Cheney, the 46th vice president of the United States (2001–2009), sought public office several times beginning in 1978. He was a member of the Republican Party, one of two major parties in the United States. Cheney represented Wyoming's at-large congressional district (1979–1989) in the United States House of Representatives. He briefly served as the House minority whip in 1989 before resigning from the House to serve as the 17th United States Secretary of Defense (1989–1993) under President George H. W. Bush.

== House of Representatives (1978–1988) ==
=== 1978 ===
Wyoming's at-large congressional district, 1978 (Republican primary):

Wyoming's at-large congressional district 1978 Republican primary
Party	Candidate	Votes	%
Republican	Dick Cheney	28,568	42.32
Republican	Ed Witzenburger	20,863	30.91
Republican	Jack R. Gage	18,075	26.78
Total		67,506	100

Wyoming's at-large congressional district, 1978:

Wyoming's at-large congressional district, 1978
Party	Candidate	Votes	%
Republican	Dick Cheney	78,855	58.63
Democratic	William D. Bagley	53,522	41.37
Total		132,377	100
Republican gain from Democratic			

=== 1980 ===
Wyoming's at-large congressional district, 1980:

Wyoming's at-large congressional district, 1980
Party	Candidate	Votes	%
Republican	Dick Cheney (inc.)	116,361	68.57
Democratic	Jim Rogers	53,338	31.43
Total		169,699	100
Republican hold			

=== 1982 ===
Wyoming's at-large congressional district, 1982:

Wyoming's at-large congressional district, 1982
Party	Candidate	Votes	%
Republican	Dick Cheney (inc.)	113,236	71.09
Democratic	Ted Hommel	46,041	28.91
Total		159,277	100
Republican hold			

=== 1984 ===
Wyoming's at-large congressional district, 1984:

Wyoming's at-large congressional district, 1984
Party	Candidate	Votes	%
Republican	Dick Cheney (inc.)	138,234	73.57
Democratic	Hugh B. McFadden, Jr.	45,857	24.40
Libertarian	Craig Alan McCune	3,813	2.03
Total		187,904	100
Republican hold			

=== 1986 ===
Wyoming's at-large congressional district, 1986:

Wyoming's at-large congressional district, 1986
Party	Candidate	Votes	%
Republican	Dick Cheney (inc.)	110,007	69.28
Democratic	Rick F. Gilmore	48,780	30.72
Total		158,787	100
Republican hold			

=== 1988 ===
Wyoming's at-large congressional district, 1988:

Wyoming's at-large congressional district, 1988
Party	Candidate	Votes	%
Republican	Dick Cheney (inc.)	118,350	66.62
Democratic	Bryan Sharratt	56,527	31.82
Libertarian	Craig Alan McCune	1,906	1.07
New Alliance	Al Hamburg	868	0.49
Total		177,651	100
Republican hold			

== United States Secretary of Defense confirmation (1989) ==
In 1989, Cheney was nominated by newly inaugurated President George H. W. Bush to serve as United States Secretary of Defense. Cheney was chosen after the United States Senate rejected Bush's nomination of Texas Senator John Tower due to his history of alcoholism. In contrast, Cheney, a respected bipartisan, was expected to easily be confirmed. On March 17, Cheney was confirmed by the Senate with a vote of 92-0 with 8 Senators not voting.

== Presidential elections ==
=== 2000 ===
==== Nomination ====
2000 Republican National Convention (Vice Presidential tally):

- Dick Cheney – 2,066 (100.00%)

==== General election ====
2000 United States presidential election:

- George W. Bush/Dick Cheney (R) – 50,460,110 (47.9%) and 271 electoral votes (30 states carried)
- Al Gore/Joe Lieberman (D) – 51,003,926 (48.4%) and 266 electoral votes (20 states and D.C. carried)
- Abstaining – 1 electoral vote (Washington, D.C. faithless elector)
- Ralph Nader/Winona LaDuke (Green) – 2,883,105 (2.7%)
- Pat Buchanan/Ezola Foster (Reform) – 449,225 (0.4%)
- Harry Browne/Art Olivier (Libertarian) – 384,516 (0.4%)
- Howard Phillips/Curtis Frazier (Constitution) – 98,022 (0.1%)
- John Hagelin/Nat Goldhaber (Natural Law) – 83,702 (0.1%)
- Others – 54,652 (0.1%)

=== 2004 ===
==== Nomination ====
2004 Republican National Convention (Vice Presidential tally):

- Dick Cheney – unanimously

==== General election ====
2004 United States presidential election:

- George W. Bush/Dick Cheney (R) (inc.) – 62,040,610 (50.73%) and 286 electoral votes (31 states carried)
- John Kerry/John Edwards (D) – 59,028,444 (48.27%) and 251 electoral votes (19 states and D.C. carried)
- John Edwards (D) – 1 electoral vote (Minnesota faithless elector)
- Ralph Nader/Peter Camejo (I) – 465,650 (0.38%)
- Michael Badnarik/Richard Campagna (Libertarian) – 397,265 (0.32%)
- Michael Peroutka/Chuck Baldwin (Constitution) – 143,630 (0.12%)
- David Cobb/Pat LaMarche (Green) – 119,859 (0.096%)
