= Ben Fernandez =

American politician (1925–2000)

United States Special Envoy to Paraguay
- In office August 1, 1973 – August 31, 1973
- President: Richard Nixon
- Preceded by: Position established
- Succeeded by: Position abolished

Personal details
- Born: February 24, 1925 Kansas City, Kansas, U.S.
- Died: April 25, 2000 (aged 75) Las Vegas, Nevada, U.S.
- Party: Republican
- Known for: First major-party presidential contender of Hispanic origin

Military service
- Allegiance: United States
- Branch/service: United States Army
- Battles/wars: World War II

Benjamin Fernandez (February 24, 1925 – April 25, 2000) was an American politician, diplomat and businessman. He was a member of the Republican Party. He ran for President of the United States three times, seriously in 1980 and with more perfunctory campaigns in 1984 and 1988, making him America's first major-party presidential contender of Hispanic origin.

Fernandez was born in Kansas to Mexican parents who were illegal immigrants. He served in World War II and then began a successful business career. He began to get involved with politics in the late 1960s, co-founding the Republican National Hispanic Council and serving as a fundraiser for Republican candidates starting with President Richard Nixon in 1972. In 1973, Nixon appointed him U.S. Special Envoy to Paraguay.

== Early life ==
Benjamin Fernandez was born in the railroad yards of Kansas City, Kansas, in a converted railroad boxcar. Fernandez was one of seven brothers and sisters. His parents were illiterate Mexican migrants who were in the U.S. illegally seeking work. The entire family worked as farm workers in Michigan and Indiana, refusing government assistance. During his political career he was fondly nicknamed "Boxcar Ben".

Fernandez enlisted in the United States Army Air Forces during World War II and served in the military for three years. After his tour of duty, he landed in California with only $20 and his G.I. benefits. Fernandez enrolled at the University of Redlands in Redlands, California, and found a job as a waiter and "supervisor of youngsters" at the local YMCA, paying his own way through college. He graduated with a Bachelor of Arts degree in Economics.

== Career ==
Upon graduating from Redlands, Fernandez moved to New York City. He worked at General Electric during the day and attended night school at the Graduate School of Business of New York University. He received a Master of Business Administration (MBA) degree in Foreign Trade and Marketing. In addition, he completed all of the course work for the Doctor of Philosophy degree in economics, Marketing, Corporate Finance, Foreign Trade and Financial History. Fernandez completed the four-year course work in two years.

General Electric recruited him for its financial management training program. Following his employment and training with General Electric, he was appointed Director of Marketing Research at the O. A. Sutton Corporation of Wichita, Kansas. After three years at the post, he moved to Los Angeles, California, and became a consulting economist, specializing in the organization of savings and loan associations and commercial banks.

His work as a financial consultant gained national attention. From 1960 through 1976, Fernandez was asked to testify over 500 times under oath before federal and state agencies on his specialties.

He also received national acclaim for his innovation in business and was recognized by the United States Department of Commerce for his work with the National Economic Development Association (NEDA), a non-profit corporation Fernandez founded to foster the free enterprise system among Spanish-speaking Americans. NEDA was responsible for over $2 billion in private sector loans, with a default factor of less than two percent.

Through his various business ventures Ben Fernandez became a millionaire.

== Political involvement ==
When a reporter asked him why he was a Republican, Fernandez recalled a story from his college days in California when someone told him that the Republican Party was the party of rich people. "Sign me up!" Fernandez replied. "I've had enough of poverty." Fernandez stated that Hispanic voters presented a "golden opportunity for the GOP," and that the Republican Party was "truly the party of the open door." He was persistent in stating that the party could reap huge benefits by embracing the fast-growing Hispanic minority in the United States, claiming that Hispanics were "natural Republicans" because they had a "centuries-old suspicion of oppressive central governments" and "learned fiscal conservatism at the knees of their mothers, who assured them that if they didn't watch their nickels they wouldn't eat."

Fernandez was very active within Republican circles and served in multiple political positions throughout the Nixon and Reagan administrations. In 1972, he served as a fundraiser for President Nixon, chairing the Hispanic Finance Committee to Re-elect the President and as National Co-chairman of the Finance Committee to Re-Elect the President. With the help of Fernandez, Nixon's 1972 Presidential campaign was the first in U.S. history to create an outreach committee for Hispanics, which was instrumental in the acquisition of 60% of the Hispanic vote. President Nixon later named Fernandez to the President's Council for Minority Enterprise. After Fernandez's fundraising for Nixon led to accusations that he promised government favors in return for campaign contributions, Fernandez appeared before the Senate Watergate Committee on November 8, 1973, to deny allegations of wrongdoing.

In August 1973, President Nixon appointed Fernandez as Special Ambassador to the Republic of Paraguay to represent the United States at the inauguration of the President of Paraguay. While there, he addressed the banking and savings and loan industries. Fernandez also served as a member of the Executive Council of the Republican National Committee in 1976.

=== Republican National Hispanic Assembly ===
Fernandez was an early and adamant supporter of Hispanic involvement within the GOP. In 1967, Fernandez was one of five World War II veterans who came together in Washington, D.C., to discuss Hispanic involvement in American Politics. He co-founded the Republican National Hispanic Council and was elected as its first national chairman. The group would later change its name to the Republican National Hispanic Assembly, and became an official branch of the Republican National Committee under the leadership of then-RNC Chairman George H. W. Bush.

While chairman of the Republican Hispanic Assembly, Fernandez experienced his share of controversy. In one instance, he sent out a "dear amigos" letter to federal employees and contractors urging attendance at a fundraising dinner for President Gerald Ford. A Republican Hispanic Assembly spokesman said he saw no impropriety in the solicitations. President Ford relied heavily on Fernandez to raise money and rally support for him in the Spanish-speaking community. When President Ford's director of the Office of Minority Business Enterprise, Alex Armendaris was accused of misconduct, Fernandez allegedly made a personal phone call to Ford urging him not to fire Armendaris. Fernandez had previously teamed up with Armendaris to raise over $400,000 for Richard Nixon. During the Senate's Watergate hearings, a Florida builder who was in trouble with the government testified that Fernandez had promised him cabinet-level help in return for a $100,000 cash donation to the Nixon campaign. Fernandez stated that he was never promised any favors for a $25,000 contribution he had made. Fernandez also denied that he had attempted to help the Nixon administration's political backers by speeding up the approval of contracts by the Office of Minority Business. Fernandez was exonerated by the Senate Watergate committee of any wrongdoing.

=== Presidential runs ===
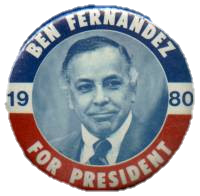
1980 Ben Fernandez campaign button.

In October 1978, Fernandez announced his candidacy for the Republican Party's nomination for president at the National Press Club in Washington, D.C. He was the first major-party presidential contender of Hispanic origin. Running in a crowded primary field in 1980, he appeared on the ballot in 18 primaries. He received 25,520 votes nationally.

During the Presidential primaries, Fernandez campaigned in both English and Spanish, emphasizing that private enterprise can do a better job than government and calling for a balanced federal budget. His campaign focused heavily on the first primary in the nation in Puerto Rico, believing that the Hispanic vote would go to a fellow Hispanic. Fernandez's campaign manager, David Miller, later admitted that the Puerto Rico strategy was a failure, as the early voting states of New Hampshire and Iowa completely overshadowed the Puerto Rico primary. After a lackluster showing in Puerto Rico, Fernandez admitted that he was unable to fire up his Hispanic base as much as he thought he could, and the lack of TV coverage of his campaign made it difficult to raise money and garner name recognition.

After Fernandez ended his primary bid, he spoke at the 1980 Republican Convention in Detroit in support of Ronald Reagan. President-elect Reagan appointed Fernandez to his transition team as his senior small business adviser. Fernandez also welcomed Reagan to Texas during his general election campaign, helping him make the pitch for the sought-after Mexican-American vote.

In 1984, Fernandez attempted a second, largely ceremonial run for the Presidency. Despite being a former Reagan adviser, Fernandez ran to highlight his disagreement with the high unemployment rate, deficit spending, and "heavy-handed" military approach of the Reagan Administration. He kept to the New Hampshire primary, along with perennial candidate Harold Stassen. Each received around one percent of the vote. Fernandez ran one last campaign on a similar scale in 1988.

== Personal life and later years ==
Fernandez had three daughters with his first wife. He remarried later in life to Jacqueline Coon and they lived in Calabasas, California. Fernandez then resided in Las Vegas, Nevada, until his death. He continued his work professionally and politically even after his retirement, often traveling throughout the country as a consulting economist. In 2000, he served on the McCain Presidential Finance Committee, his last political involvement before his death.

== Legacy ==
Fernandez's status as the first Hispanic presidential candidate was largely forgotten in subsequent decades; when New Mexico Governor Bill Richardson, running in 2008, declared himself to be the first ever Hispanic candidate, his statement went mostly uncorrected.
