= Electoral history of Bill Clinton =

Timeline of Bill Clinton's political career

←	Nov 5: 1974 United States House of Representatives elections § Arkansas

←	Nov 2: 1976 Arkansas attorney general election

←	Nov 7: 1978 Arkansas gubernatorial election

←	Nov 4: 1980 Arkansas gubernatorial election

←	Nov 2: 1982 Arkansas gubernatorial election

←	Nov 6: 1984 Arkansas gubernatorial election

←	Nov 4: 1986 Arkansas gubernatorial election

←	Nov 6: 1990 Arkansas gubernatorial election

←	Nov 3: 1992 United States presidential election

←	Nov 5: 1996 United States presidential election

Not in any public office
Vice Chairman of the National Governors Association
Chairman of the National Governors Association

Notes
Successful election campaigns are mentioned in Green links to corresponding article
Unsuccessful election campaigns are mentioned in Orange links to corresponding article

Bill Clinton served as the 42nd president of the United States (1993–2001) and as the 40th and 42nd governor of Arkansas (1979–1981; 1983–1992). A member of the Democratic Party, Clinton first ran for a public office in 1974, competing in the congressional election for Arkansas's 3rd congressional district. After narrowly losing to incumbent representative John Paul Hammerschmidt, he ran for the office of Arkansas Attorney General in 1976. He won the Democratic primary comfortably, receiving over 55% of the popular vote. Witnessing his strong support during the primaries, Republicans did not nominate a candidate to run against him. Clinton won the general election unopposed. His experience as the attorney general was considered a natural "stepping-stone" to the governorship.

After serving as attorney general, Clinton ran for governor of Arkansas in 1978. He defeated the Republican nominee to win the election. At age 32, became the nation's youngest governor in January 1979. He lost re-election to the Republican nominee Frank D. White in 1980. After leaving office in January 1981, Clinton self-deprecatingly referred to himself as "the youngest former governor in the history of the country". In 1982, he ran again in the gubernatorial election, defeating Governor White. He contested and won the 1984, 1986, and 1990 gubernatorial elections.

In 1992, Clinton contested the Democratic primaries for the presidential nomination. Initially trailing Jerry Brown in the polls, his lead eventually increased, and he became the front runner. After being the runner-up in the New Hampshire primary, he delivered a speech labeling himself as the "Comeback Kid", which re-energized his campaign. After becoming the presumptive nominee, he selected Al Gore, a senator from Tennessee as his running mate; the Clinton–Gore ticket defeated the incumbent, President George H. W. Bush, and Vice President Dan Quayle. In December 1992, he resigned as governor and became the 42nd president of the United States on January 20, 1993. As president, he signed the North American Free Trade Agreement into law. His handling of the federal budget and the Bosnian War likely helped him keep his approval ratings high, and most of the polls showed him leading throughout 1996. Facing no major challenge within the Democratic Party, Clinton and Gore were re-nominated as the presidential and vice-presidential candidates. In the 1996 presidential election, the Clinton–Gore ticket was re-elected, defeating Republican presidential nominee Bob Dole and vice-presidential nominee Jack Kemp.

== 1974 congressional election ==
Bill Clinton was born in Hope, Arkansas, in 1946. After graduating from the Georgetown University, he won a Rhodes Scholarship to the University of Oxford. After receiving his Juris Doctor degree from the Yale Law School in 1973, he decided to compete in the 1974 congressional election in Arkansas's 3rd congressional district. He announced his candidacy on February 25, 1974. At age 27, he was one of the youngest candidates for a congressional election in the nation. While campaigning, he addressed gatherings in small rural areas of the state. When addressing these gatherings, he often attacked Richard Nixon, the incumbent Republican president, for his policies on Vietnam, and his alleged involvement in the Watergate scandal. Two weeks before the Democratic primaries, he was able to raise $36,000 (equivalent to $235,020 in 2025) from donations. He led the primaries with almost 44% of the popular vote, against relatively better-known opponents, including Arkansas state senator Gene Rainwater. Since no candidate got a majority of the vote in the primary, a runoff election was conducted between Clinton and Rainwater. Clinton easily won the runoff, receiving 69% of the popular vote.

In the general election, he challenged the incumbent Republican representative John Paul Hammerschmidt. Clinton supported balancing the national budget, controlling inflation, reducing the size of the federal bureaucracy, and broadening federal aid for schools. He continued attacking Hammerschmidt for his support of Nixon, which successfully helped him to garner the support of some moderate Republican voters. Clinton said, "If we had the kind of congress we needed years ago, then we would not be facing this sad prospect." But soon after President Nixon's resignation on August 8, 1974, Clinton's lead faded as the country's attention turned to other matters. In September, he was lagging in the polls with 23% support to Hammerschmidt's 59%. During the last weeks of campaigning, various newspapers, including the Arkansas Gazette, endorsed him. On election day, he lost the race to Hammerschmidt, receiving a little more than 48.2% of the popular vote against Hammerschmidt's almost 52%. Clinton calls his 1974 congressional campaign the "best campaign" he ever ran.

=== Democratic primary ===
1974 Democratic primary election results
Party	Candidate	Votes	%
Democratic	Bill Clinton	59,697	43.60%
Democratic	Gene Rainwater	36,145	26.40%
Democratic	David Stewart	34,959	25.53%
Democratic	James A. Scanlon	6,121	4.47%
Total votes		136,922	100.00%

1974 Democratic primary runoff election results
Party	Candidate	Votes	%
Democratic	Bill Clinton	37,788	68.96%
Democratic	Gene Rainwater	17,011	31.04%
Total votes		54,799	100.00%

=== General election ===
1974 Arkansas's 3rd congressional district election
Party	Candidate	Votes	%
Republican	John Paul Hammerschmidt (incumbent)	89,324	51.83%
Democratic	Bill Clinton	83,030	48.17%
Total votes		172,354	100%
Republican hold			

== 1976 Arkansas attorney general election ==
After marrying Hillary Rodham in October 1975, Clinton decided to run in the Democratic primaries for the office of attorney general of Arkansas. The incumbent attorney general Jim Guy Tucker was not running for re-election; he ran instead for Arkansas's 2nd congressional district. Clinton announced his campaign in the rotunda of the Arkansas State Capitol on March 6. He supported mandatory prison terms for some crimes and the creation of an ombudsman position in the attorney general's office. He made bringing back "Law and Order" a central theme of his campaign. George Jernigan, the secretary of state for Arkansas, and Clarence Cash, the deputy attorney general of Arkansas, challenged him. Clinton easily won the primary contest, getting over 55% of the popular vote. Apart from organizing his campaign, he coordinated Jimmy Carter's 1976 presidential campaign in Arkansas. Witnessing his strong support during the primaries, Republicans did not nominate a candidate to run against him. Clinton won the general election unopposed. Just two months after assuming the office, the Arkansas Junior Chamber of Commerce named him the "Outstanding Young Man of the Year". His experience as the attorney general was considered a natural "stepping-stone" to the governorship.

=== Democratic primary ===
1976 Democratic primary election results
Party	Candidate	Votes	%
Democratic	Bill Clinton	273,744	55.65%
Democratic	George Jernigan	123,819	25.17%
Democratic	Clarence Cash	94,384	19.19%
Total votes		491,947	100%

=== General election ===
1976 Arkansas Attorney General election results
Party	Candidate	Votes	%
Democratic	Bill Clinton	(Note: Clinton won the Arkansas Attorney General election unopposed.)	100%
Total votes		–	100%
Democratic hold			

== 1978 Arkansas gubernatorial election ==
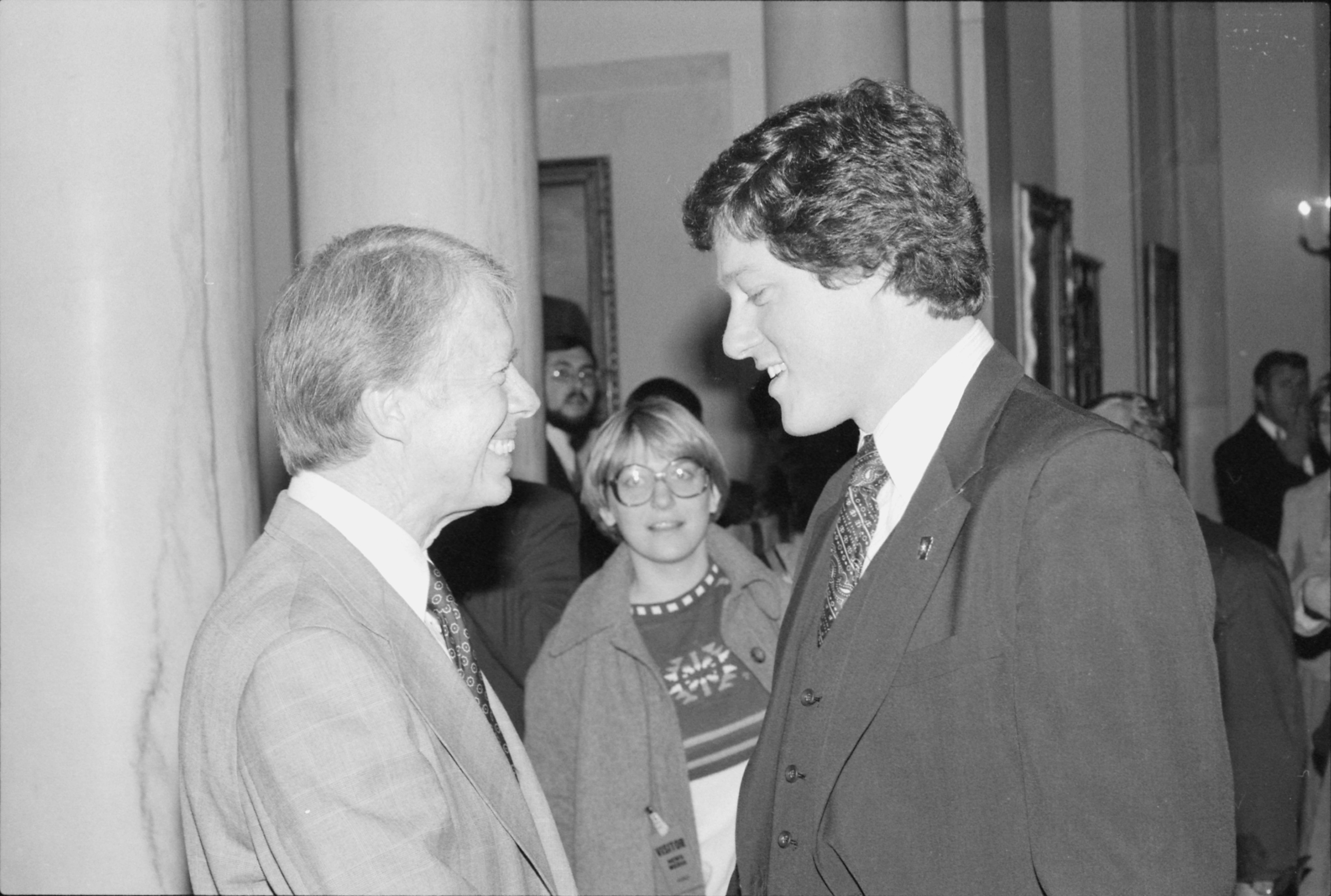
Newly elected Governor of Arkansas Bill Clinton meets with President Jimmy Carter in 1978.

In 1978, David Pryor, the incumbent governor of Arkansas, announced that he would not seek a third term, and instead run for the United States Senate. In March 1978, just fourteen months after becoming attorney general, Clinton announced his candidacy for the gubernatorial election. He was unsure whether to run for governor or the Senate seat being vacated by John L. McClellan. His initial intention was to run for the Senate, because of the difference in the length of tenure of each office, (Note: Clinton asserted that governors have to face re-election every two years, while senators have tenure for six years.) but ultimately decided to run in the gubernatorial primaries. As the state manager of Carter's successful 1976 presidential run, Clinton gained popularity among national Democratic leaders. In his announcement speech, he cited his experience as attorney general and said, "In the office I now have, I have gained precious experience in the workings of every aspect of state, county, and local government." In the Democratic primaries, four minor candidates challenged him. He raised $600,000 (equivalent to $2,961,735 in 2025) from fundraising, and garnered support from the majority of labor organizations and the business community.

The Arkansas Gazette endorsed Clinton and wrote that "He has extraordinary credentials, an unusual intellect and a dazzling personality to bring to bear upon the problems and opportunities that will confront the next governor." National columnists Jack Germond and Jules Witcover endorsed him and wrote articles supporting his campaign. Clinton easily won the primaries, receiving almost 60% of the popular vote. In the general election, Lynn Lowe, a Republican official and farmer from Texarkana, challenged him. During the final weeks of the campaign, Billy G. Geren, a retired Air Force lieutenant colonel, accused Clinton of dodging the draft during the Vietnam War. Clinton dismissed Geren's claim and asserted he never received a draft determent. With no official documents to substantiate either side, the issue was soon forgotten. On election day, Clinton easily won the governorship, receiving over 63% of the popular vote. At 32 years old, he was Arkansas's, and the nation's youngest governor. As the governor-elect, he proposed a pay rise of $2,400 for teachers for the following two fiscal years. The New York Times called Clinton's victory "beyond traditional ideological terms". Clinton later described his 1978 gubernatorial campaign as "running for class president".

=== Democratic primary ===
Map of the County results of the 1978 Arkansas gubernatorial election Clinton: 50–60% 60–70% 70–80% 80–90% Lowe: 50–60% 60–70%

1978 Democratic primary election results
Party	Candidate	Votes	%
Democratic	Bill Clinton	341,098	59.66%
Democratic	Joe Woodward	123,684	21.63%
Democratic	Frank Lady	75,026	13.12%
Democratic	Randall Mathis	25,996	4.55%
Democratic	Monroe Schwarzlose	5,898	1.03%
Total votes		571,702	100%

=== General election ===
1978 Arkansas gubernatorial election
Party	Candidate	Votes	%
Democratic	Bill Clinton	338,684	63.39%
Republican	Lynn Lowe	195,550	36.6%
Total votes		534,299	100%
Democratic hold			

== 1980 Arkansas gubernatorial election ==
"You know what the number one issue was on the exit polls; why they voted against him [Bill Clinton]?"
–"[because] His wife didn't have his name"

— Frank D. White, Clinton's opponent in the 1980 gubernatorial election

During his governorship, Clinton worked on educational reform and directed the maintenance of Arkansas's roads. His wife Hillary Rodham led a successful committee on urban health care reform. Clinton became popular as a national leader, however, his term included an unpopular motor vehicle tax. Many citizens were angry over the escape of Cuban refugees (from the Mariel boatlift) detained at Fort Chaffee (AR) in 1980. On March 31, 1980, Clinton officially filed documents to seek a second term. In the Democratic primaries, Monroe Schwarzlose, a 78-year-old retired farmer, who challenged him in the 1978 Democratic gubernatorial primaries ran against Clinton again. Clinton won the Democratic nomination, receiving almost 70% of the popular vote. In the general election, the Republican nominee Frank D. White challenged Clinton. White accused him of being out of touch with ordinary voters and claimed his policies had raised the tax burden on the middle class. He accused the first lady of being too independent and chastised her for not taking her husband's last name.

In late August, Clinton gave a speech at the 1980 Democratic National Convention. When David S. Broder, a journalist for The Washington Post was asked to name two young people who would most likely be the president in the future, he said "I would choose Bill Clinton, the 34-year-old Governor of Arkansas for Democrats, and Jack Kemp, 45, Republican Congressman from Erie County, New York." In mid-October, Clinton told the press that "I have never felt more comfortable and at ease before an election", confidently anticipating a victory; however White narrowly defeated him by a margin of just 3.9%.

=== Democratic primary ===
Map of the County results of the 1980 Arkansas gubernatorial election White: 50–60% 60–70% 70–80% Clinton: 50–60% 60–70%

1980 Democratic primary election results
Party	Candidate	Votes	%
Democratic	Bill Clinton (incumbent)	306,736	68.87%
Democratic	Monroe Schwarzlose	138,670	31.13%
Total votes		445,406	100%

=== General election ===
1980 Arkansas gubernatorial election
Party	Candidate	Votes	%
Republican	Frank D. White	435,684	51.93%
Democratic	Bill Clinton (incumbent)	403,242	48.07%
Total votes		838,926	100%
Republican gain from Democratic			

== 1982 Arkansas gubernatorial election ==
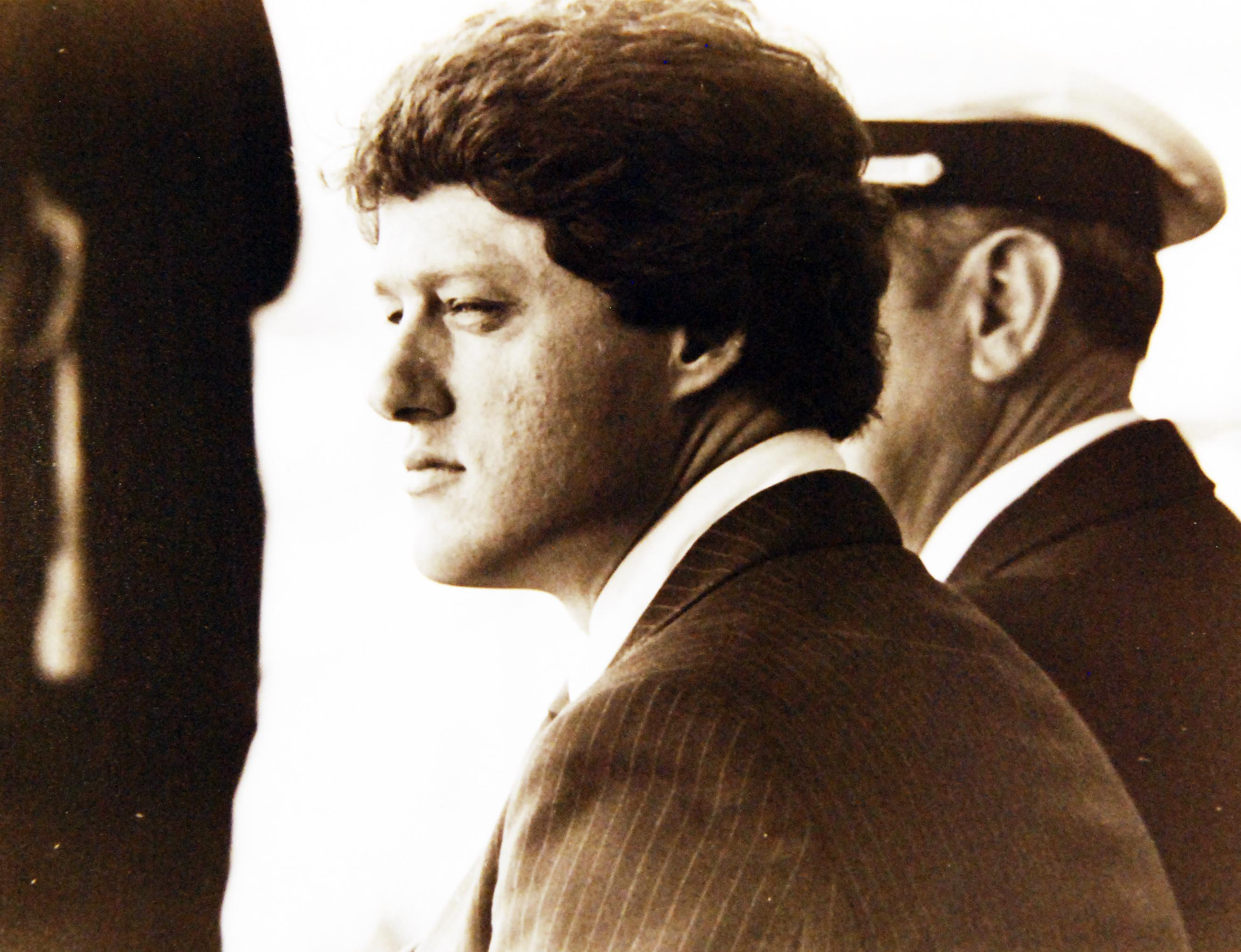
Clinton in the early 1980s

After losing the governorship in 1980, Clinton self-deprecatingly referred to himself as "the youngest former governor in the history of the country". (Note: Clinton humorously repeated the same in his 2016 Democratic National Convention speech; although he was not the youngest former governor is American history.) He joined his friend Bruce Lindsey's Little Rock law firm of Wright, Lindsey, and Jennings. In early February 1982, Clinton announced his candidacy for the 1982 gubernatorial election. In a 30-second televised advertisement, he admitted making mistakes in his first term, but asked voters for their trust and support. While campaigning in late February, Hillary Rodham began referring to herself as "Mrs. Bill Clinton". Joe Purcell, a former lieutenant governor and attorney general of Arkansas, and Jim Guy Tucker, the representative for Arkansas's 2nd congressional district and a former attorney general, launched strong challenges against him in the Democratic primaries. Determined to undercut Tucker, Clinton claimed that Tucker was mostly absent from the House of Representatives during his tenure as a representative.

Clinton said he lost the 1980 election badly because he had been out of touch with the people. He said, "They [voters] elected him [Governor White] in a protest vote." While campaigning for the 1982 election, Clinton began appearing at town hall meetings, a relatively new format that helped him to maintain his popularity and get in touch with voters. He won almost 42% of the popular vote in the primary. Since no candidate won a majority, a runoff election was conducted between Clinton and Purcell. Clinton won, defeating Purcell by almost 7.4% of the popular vote. Even after Clinton's victory, Purcell refused to endorse him for the general election. The rift was such that Purcell's campaign manager, Joe McCarty, headed a group called "Democrats for White" in the general election.

The general election was a re-match between Clinton and Governor White. Clinton removed many of his 1980 campaign staff members from his 1982 campaign team after being criticized for having too young a staff. He appointed James Herbert Jones, better known as "Jimmie Red Jones," a former eight-term state auditor, as his campaign chairman. He proposed his plan for utility reform in Arkansas and supported the direct election of members of the Public Service Commission by a popular vote. Governor White criticized Clinton's televised campaign advertisements, referring to their claims as "totally erroneous". Clinton dismissed White's assertion, and condemned his decision to abolish the state Energy Department instead. Clinton defeated Governor White in the general election and became the first and only governor of Arkansas to be elected to non-consecutive terms.

=== Democratic primary ===
Map of the County results of the 1982 Arkansas gubernatorial election Clinton: 50–60% 60–70% 70–80% White: 50–60% 60–70%

1982 Democratic primary election results
Party	Candidate	Votes	%
Democratic	Bill Clinton	236,961	41.78%
Democratic	Joe Purcell	166,066	29.28%
Democratic	Jim Guy Tucker	129,362	22.81%
Democratic	Kim Hendren	21,829	3.85%
Democratic	Monroe Schwarzlose	12,907	2.28%
Total votes		567,125	100%

1982 Democratic primary runoff election results
Party	Candidate	Votes	%
Democratic	Bill Clinton	239,209	53.69%
Democratic	Joe Purcell	206,358	46.31%
Total votes		445,567	100%

=== General election ===
1982 Arkansas gubernatorial election
Party	Candidate	Votes	%
Democratic	Bill Clinton	431,855	54.71%
Republican	Frank D. White (incumbent)	357,496	45.29%
Total votes		789,351	100%
Democratic gain from Republican			

== 1984 Arkansas gubernatorial election ==
During his second term as governor, Clinton called a special session of the state legislature to vote on his education agenda. After six weeks of debate, the legislature passed his agenda by a margin of one vote. In late 1983, the Arkansas state police arrested his half-brother Roger Clinton on drug charges. Clinton ordered the police to continue with their investigation against Roger. After Roger was arrested, Clinton held a press conference and said: "drugs are a curse which has reached epidemic proportion and has plagued the lives of millions of families in our nation, including many in our state". Roger pleaded not guilty, but was sentenced to three years in the central prison. Many of Clinton's opponents used his brother's drug conviction against him, hoping to prevent him from seeking another term; however, by late May, Clinton announced his candidacy for a third term. Lonnie Turner, a former prosecutor, challenged Clinton in the Democratic primaries. He criticized Clinton for the Truck tax adopted by the state legislature. He said there is "anti-Clinton sentiment in the state due to the Truck tax, largely because the incumbent governor has not kept his word". However, Clinton easily won the primary, receiving almost 64.5% of the vote.

In the general election, Woody Freeman, a utility contractor and former Higher Education Commission chair, who won the Republican nomination, challenged Clinton. Clinton was invited to address the 1984 Democratic National Convention, where he invoked the memory of Harry S. Truman, and said "Harry Truman would tell us to forget about 1948, and stand for what Americans think in 1984." Walter Mondale, the Democratic nominee for the presidency, appreciated and endorsed Clinton for the election. Clinton raised almost $100,000 (equivalent to $309,898 in 2025) to push a constitutional amendment on the 1984 ballot, increasing the length of the governor's tenure from to two to four years after the 1986 election. Holding the governorship would help him run for president in 1988 or 1992. He called the 1984 election a "public referendum on his educational reform". Despite a Republican landslide in the general election with Ronald Reagan winning 49 of the 50 states, Clinton won reelection, defeating Freeman by almost 25% of the popular vote. The public referendum for the four-year term was widely accepted, with almost 64.3% of the voters voting for it.

=== Democratic primary ===
Map of the County results of the 1984 Arkansas gubernatorial election. Clinton: 50–60% 60–70% 70–80% 80–90% Freeman: 50–60%

1984 Democratic primary election results
Party	Candidate	Votes	%
Democratic	Bill Clinton (incumbent)	317,214	64.43%
Democratic	Lonnie Turner	119,264	24.22%
Democratic	Kermit Moss	31,727	6.44%
Democratic	Monroe Schwarzlose	24,116	4.9%
Total votes		492,321	100%

=== General election ===
1984 Arkansas gubernatorial election
Party	Candidate	Votes	%
Democratic	Bill Clinton (incumbent)	554,561	62.55%
Republican	Woody Freeman	331,987	37.45%
Total votes		886,548	100%
Democratic hold			

== 1986 Arkansas gubernatorial election ==
In his third term as governor, Clinton served as the chairman of the Education Commission of the States, and the chairman of the National Governors Association from 1986 to 1987, bringing him to the attention of audiences beyond Arkansas. His education reform agenda proved successful when the percentage of graduating seniors who moved onto college increased from 30% to 50%, though many teacher unions were protesting his "teachers' test" policy.

Former Arkansas governor Orval Faubus challenged him in the Democratic primary. Long retired from politics, Faubus opposed Clinton's overly liberal policies. Meanwhile, Frank White, the former governor who defeated Clinton in 1980, was planning to challenge him again. By early June, Clinton secured his party's nomination, defeating Faubus with over 60% of the popular vote. Frank White won the Republican nomination and said: "I did it [won election] before, I can do it again." Clinton featured in a series of statewide television and newspaper ads, and a pamphlet campaign called "Make a Difference Arkansas", promoting state products. The White campaign criticized it and tried to stop their broadcast, calling the advertisements an "attempt by the Clinton campaign to circumvent campaign finance and reporting laws". On election day, Clinton won the gubernatorial election for the fourth time. This time, he was elected to a four-year term.

=== Democratic primary ===
Map of the County results of the 1986 Arkansas gubernatorial election Clinton: 50–60% 60–70% 70–80% White: 50–60% 60–70%

1986 Democratic primary election results
Party	Candidate	Votes	%
Democratic	Bill Clinton (incumbent)	315,397	60.58%
Democratic	Orval E. Faubus	174,402	33.5%
Democratic	W. Dean Goldsby	30,829	5.92%
Total votes		520,628	100%

=== General election ===
1986 Arkansas gubernatorial election
Party	Candidate	Votes	%
Democratic	Bill Clinton (incumbent)	439,882	63.89%
Republican	Frank D. White	248,427	36.08%
Write-in (politician)	H. L. Clement	113	0.02%
Write-in (politician)	Betty White	109	0.02%
Write-In (politician)	H. Davidson	14	0%
Write-in (politician)	C. Vance	6	0%
Total votes		688,551	100%
Democratic hold			

== 1990 Arkansas gubernatorial election ==
In his fourth term as governor, there was speculation that Clinton was a potential presidential candidate for the 1988 presidential election. Secretly, he sent his campaign workers to Iowa and New Hampshire, the states with the earliest presidential caucuses/primaries, to lay the groundwork for his campaign. By July 1987, he was prepared to announce his candidacy for the presidential nomination. However, in a press conference on July 15, 1987, he said he had decided not to compete in the primaries, because his family needed him more than his country. He was invited to deliver an address at the 1988 Democratic National Convention, where he endorsed Massachusetts Governor Michael Dukakis for the presidency. Dukakis lost the election to Republican nominee George H. W. Bush.

Clinton decided to seek a fifth term as Arkansas' governor. He filed the official papers for re-election on March 29, 1990, and said, "Now we have to focus on the next step, because every election is not about yesterday, it's about tomorrow." He promised to generate high-paying jobs by recruiting better-paying employers, and opposed efforts to repeal tax programs that draw business to Arkansas. Tom McRae, former president of the Winthrop Rockefeller Foundation challenged him. Clinton easily secured the nomination by winning almost 55% of the popular vote in the primaries. He began the 1990 campaign by saying that "the fire of an election no longer burns in me". While campaigning, he promised to serve a full term as the governor; however, in the aftermath of Dukakis's defeat, Clinton was one of the front-runners for the 1992 Democratic presidential nomination.

In the general election, Sheffield Nelson, the chairman of the Arkansas Republican Party, challenged Clinton. During the campaign, Nelson ran a series of advertisements, criticizing Clinton's tax and spending policies. This likely helped him boost his polling numbers, however, Clinton remained comfortably ahead in the final months of the campaign. On election day, Clinton defeated Nelson, winning over 57% of the popular vote.

=== Democratic primary ===
Map of the County results of the 1990 Arkansas gubernatorial election Clinton: 50–60% 60–70% 70–80% Nelson: 50–60% 60–70%

1990 Democratic primary election results
Party	Candidate	Votes	%
Democratic	Bill Clinton (incumbent)	269,329	54.84%
Democratic	Tom McRae	190,887	38.87%
Democratic	Joe Holmes	9,659	1.97%
Democratic	Jerry Tolliver	8,629	1.76%
Democratic	O. O. "Woodrow" Wilson	8,341	1.7%
Democratic	Cyrus Young	4,301	0.88%
Total votes		491,146	100.00%

=== General election ===
1990 Arkansas gubernatorial election
Party	Candidate	Votes	%
Democratic	Bill Clinton (incumbent)	400,386	57.49%
Republican	Sheffield Nelson	295,925	42.49%
Independent	Elton White	81	0.01%
Independent	Benjamin Paul Talbot, Jr.	22	0%
Total votes		696,414	100%
Democratic hold			

== 1992 United States presidential election ==
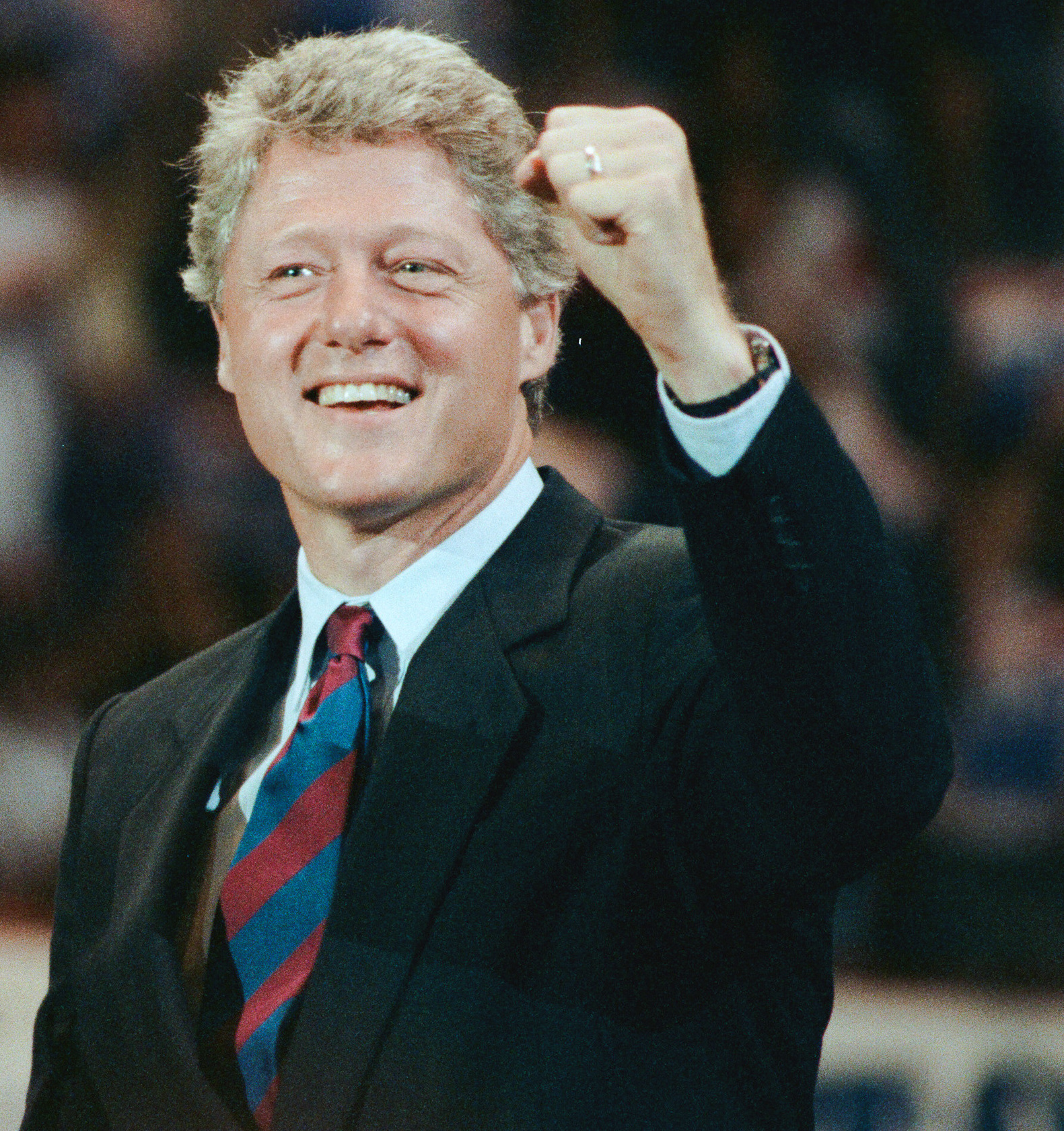
Bill Clinton at North Carolina State University in October 1992

Soon after the 1990 Arkansas gubernatorial election, there was again speculation that Clinton was a potential presidential candidate for the 1992 presidential election. Although he initially declined to run for the presidency, he declared his candidacy in early October 1991. With President Bush's approval rating skyrocketing after Operation Desert Storm, high-profile Democratic Party candidates, such as Mario Cuomo and Jesse Jackson, refused to seek the Democratic nomination. In the lead-in to the 1992 New Hampshire Democratic primary, scandal rocked the Clinton campaign when Gennifer Flowers told reporters of her 12-year sexual affair with Clinton. At the same time, Clinton was accused of misleading the U.S. Army Reserve to avoid service in the Vietnam War. Bill and Hillary Clinton denied the sexual misconduct allegations in an interview with Steve Kroft on an episode of 60 Minutes airing after Super Bowl XXVI.

Though Jerry Brown was leading in the polls in September 1991, Clinton's lead eventually increased, and he became the front runner. He lost the Iowa caucus to Tom Harkin, getting only 2.8% of the votes; he lost the New Hampshire primary to Paul Tsongas. After coming in second place in New Hampshire, he delivered a speech labeling himself "The Comeback Kid", which re-energized his campaign. After Harkin dropped out of the race, Clinton won eight of the 11 contests on Super Tuesday and won most of the primaries after that. After the North Dakota primary, Paul Tsongas dropped out, leaving only Clinton and Brown in the race. Although Brown continued to campaign in several states, he won no more primaries. Despite this, he still had a sizable number of delegates, and a big win in his home state of California would have deprived Clinton of sufficient support to win the nomination.

After getting enough delegates to win the convention, Clinton shortlisted six potential vice presidential candidates, which included:

- Al Gore – Senator from Tennessee (1985–1993)
- Bob Graham – Senator from Florida (1987–2005)
- Jay Rockefeller – Senator from West Virginia (1985–2015)
- Harris Wofford – Senator from Pennsylvania (1991–1995)
- Bob Kerrey – Senator from Nebraska (1989–2001)
- Lee H. Hamilton – Representative from Indiana's 9th congressional district (1965–1999)

Former Deputy Secretary of State Warren Christopher led Clinton's vice-presidential selection team. Ultimately, Clinton chose Gore, a senator from Tennessee, who sought the Democratic presidential nomination in 1988. In making the selection, Clinton emphasized Gore's experience with foreign policy and environmental issues. He appeared on The Arsenio Hall Show on Wednesday, June 3, 1992, the day after he secured the Democratic Party nomination and played "Heartbreak Hotel" on the saxophone. This was considered an important moment in the campaign, as it helped him build popularity among young voters. Clinton received a significant poll bounce from the convention, because of the perceived success of the convention and independent presidential candidate Ross Perot announcing his withdrawal from the campaign hours before Clinton's acceptance speech. He was officially nominated as the candidate, receiving 3,372 delegates.

Soon after the convention, Clinton and Gore traveled around the country by bus campaigning. In the general election, Clinton challenged the incumbent, President Bush, and businessman Ross Perot, who by early October had re-entered the race. The Bush campaign used various attack ads against Clinton, criticizing him over tax increases during his governorship, and his inconsistency on major issues like term limits and defense. Clinton's political advisor, James Carville, coined the phrase "It's the economy, stupid", which was often used to attack the Bush campaign. Clinton was praised widely for his performance in the presidential debates, which likely helped him keep his polling numbers high. On election day, Clinton defeated Bush winning 370 electoral votes, and 43% of the popular vote, to become the 42nd president.

=== Democratic presidential primaries ===
First instance vote by state and territory of the 1992 Democratic Party presidential primaries
Bill Clinton Jerry Brown Paul Tsongas Tom Harkin Bob Kerrey

Electoral college map of the 1992 United States presidential election

1992 Democratic Party presidential primaries
Party	Candidate	Votes	%
Democratic	Bill Clinton	10,482,411	51.79%
Democratic	Jerry Brown	4,071,232	20.12%
Democratic	Paul Tsongas	3,656,010	18.06%
–	Uncommitted	750,873	3.71%
Democratic	Bob Kerrey	318,457	1.57%
Democratic	Tom Harkin	280,304	1.38%
Other	Various candidates	679,019	3.33%
Total votes		20,239,385	100%

=== Democratic National Convention ===
1992 Democratic presidential nomination
Party	Candidate	No. of delegates	%
Democratic	Bill Clinton	3,372	78.64%
Democratic	Jerry Brown	596	13.9%
Democratic	Paul Tsongas	209	4.87%
Democratic	Robert P. Casey	10	0.23%
Democratic	Patricia Schroeder	8	0.19%
Democratic	Larry Agran	3	0.07%
Democratic	Ron Daniels	1	0.02%
Democratic	Al Gore	1	0.02%
Democratic	Joseph Simonett	1	0.02%
–	Not voting	86	2.01%
Total delegates		4288	100%

=== Presidential election ===
1992 United States presidential election * denotes incumbent
Party	Presidential candidate	Vice-presidential candidate	PV (%)	EV (%)
Democratic	Bill Clinton	Al Gore	44,909,889 (43.01%)	370 (68.77%)
Republican	George H. W. Bush*	Dan Quayle*	39,104,545 (37.45%)	168 (31.23%)
Independent	Ross Perot	James Stockdale	19,742,267 (18.91%)	0 (0%)
Libertarian	Andre Marrou	Nancy Lord	291,628 (0.28%)	0 (0%)
Populist	Bo Gritz	Cyril Minett	107,002 (0.1%)	0 (0%)
New Alliance	Lenora Fulani	Maria Elizabeth Muñoz	73,708 (0.07%)	0 (0%)
U.S. Taxpayers	Howard Phillips	Albion Knight, Jr.	43,398 (0.04%)	0 (0%)
Others			152,516 (0.15%)	0 (0%)
Total votes:			104,423,923 (100%)	538 (100%)
Votes necessary:				270

== 1996 United States presidential election ==
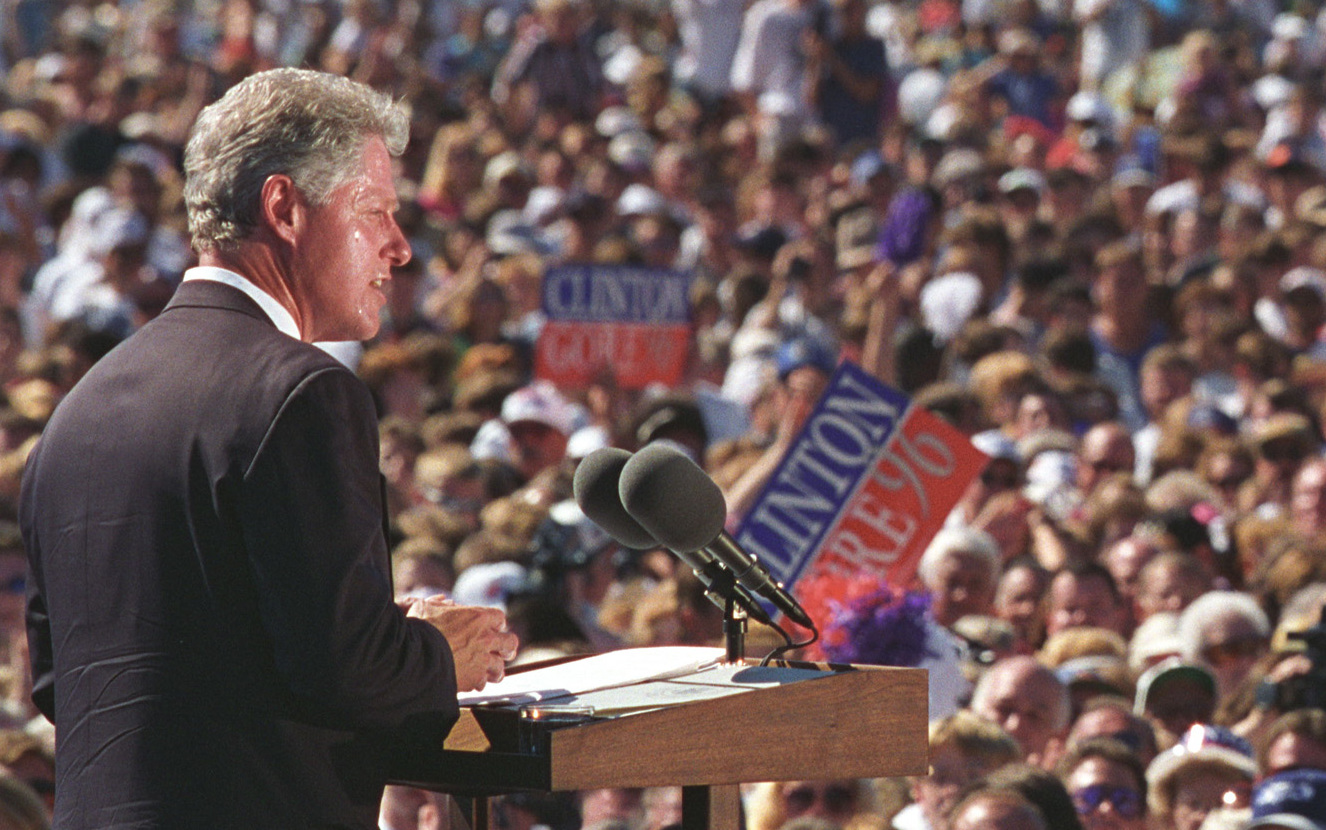
Bill Clinton addressing a crowd at one of his 1996 re-election campaign rallies

In his first term as the president, Clinton signed the North American Free Trade Agreement into law. His handling of the federal budget and the Bosnian War likely helped him keep his approval ratings high, and most of the polls showed him leading. His approval ratings were in the 40% to 50% range. Facing no major threat within the Democratic party, he won the primary election, receiving over 88% of the popular vote. To accept the nomination, Clinton campaigned on a train named "21st Century Express", traveling through West Virginia, Ohio, and Michigan on the way to Illinois, three crucial states for his re-election. He was re-nominated by the Democratic party in the 1996 Democratic National Convention, receiving 4277 of the 4289 delegates' votes.

In the general election, Republicans nominated 73-year-old Senate majority leader, Bob Dole, as their presidential nominee. Texas businessman Ross Perot, who had previously run in the 1992 presidential election as an independent candidate, announced his candidacy for the 1996 presidential election as the Reform Party's candidate. The Clinton campaign avoided mentioning Dole's age directly, instead choosing to confront it in more subtle ways such as the campaign slogan "Building Bridges to the Future" in contrast to Dole's frequent remarks he was building a "bridge to the past".

On election day, Clinton won a decisive victory over Dole, becoming the first Democrat to win two consecutive presidential elections since Franklin D. Roosevelt. He received 379 electoral votes to Dole's 159. Clinton's victory helped to cement Democratic presidential control in California, Vermont, Maine, Illinois, New Jersey, and Connecticut; all voted Democrat in every subsequent presidential election.

Electoral college map of the 1996 United States presidential election. Blue and Red states depict states won by Democratic and Republican party respectively.

=== Democratic presidential primary ===
1996 Democratic Party presidential primaries
Party	Candidate	Votes	%
Democratic	Bill Clinton (incumbent)	9,730,184	88.49%
Democratic	Lyndon LaRouche	597,081	5.43%
–	Uncommitted	423,265	3.85%
Democratic	Elvena Lloyd-Duffie	92,435	0.84%
Other	Various candidates	153,430	1.4%
Total votes		10,996,395	100%

=== Democratic National Convention ===
1996 Democratic presidential nomination
Party	Candidate	No. of delegates	%
Democratic	Bill Clinton (incumbent)	4,277	99.72%
–	Not voting	12	0.28%
Total delegates		4289	100%

=== Presidential election ===
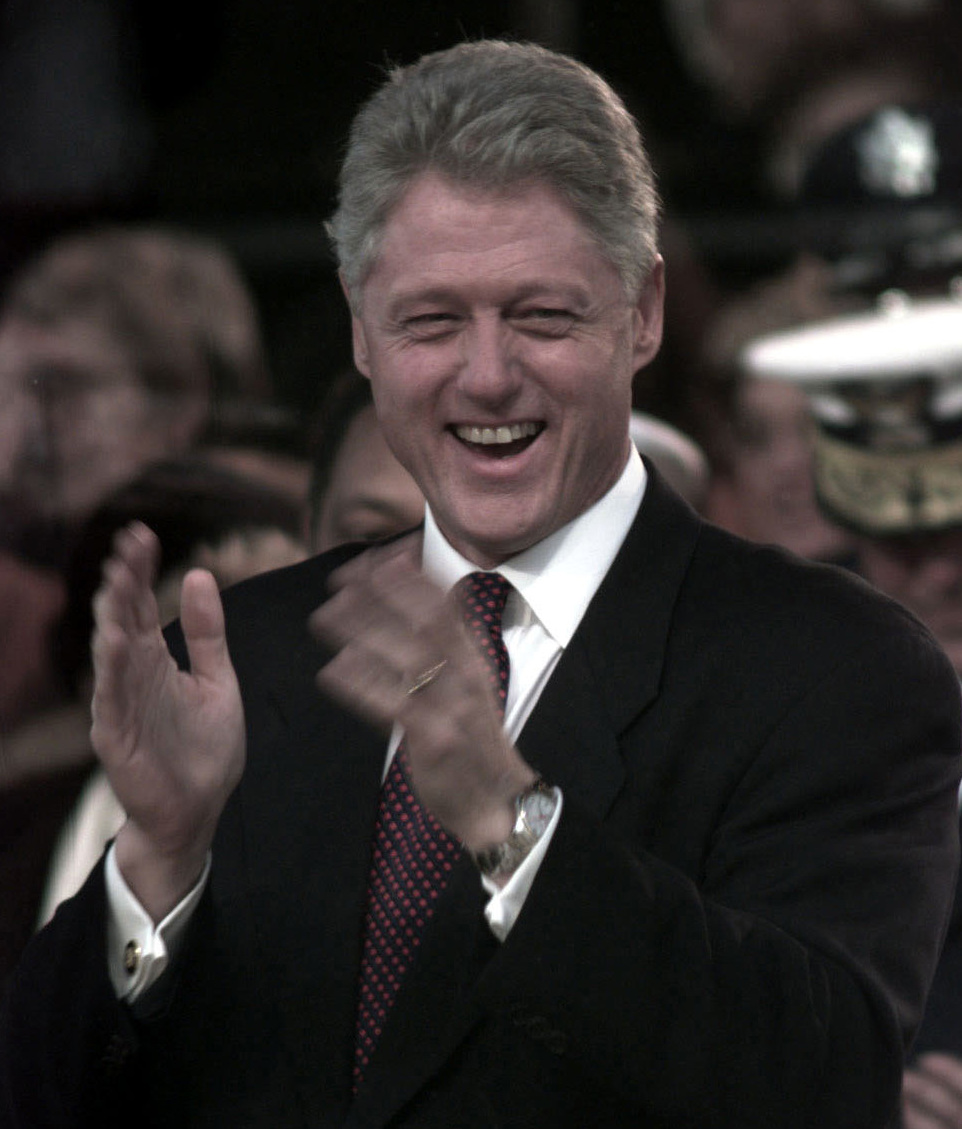
President Bill Clinton during his 1997 inaugural parade

1996 United States presidential election * denotes incumbent
Party	Presidential candidate	Vice-presidential candidate	PV (%)	EV (%)
Democratic	Bill Clinton*	Al Gore*	47,402,357 (49.23%)	379 (70.45%)
Republican	Bob Dole	Jack Kemp	39,198,755 (40.71%)	159 (29.55%)
Reform	Ross Perot	Pat Choate	8,085,402 (8.4%)	0 (0%)
Green	Ralph Nader	Winona LaDuke	685,297 (0.71%)	0 (0%)
Libertarian	Harry Browne	Jo Jorgensen	485,759 (0.5%)	0 (0%)
U.S. Taxpayers	Howard Phillips	Herbert Titus	184,656 (0.19%)	0 (0%)
Natural Law	John Hagelin	Mike Tompkins	113,670 (0.12%)	0 (0%)
Others			113,667 (0.12%)	0 (0%)
Total votes:			96,277,634 (100%)	538 (100%)
Votes necessary:				270

== See also ==
- Electoral history of Hillary Clinton
- Electoral history of Al Gore

== Works cited ==
=== Primary sources ===
- Riviere, Paul (1980). "1976 Arkansas Election – A Compilation of Primary Run-off & General Election Results for State & District Offices" (PDF). Secretary of State of Arkansas. Archived (PDF) from the original on July 9, 2021.
- Riviere, Paul (1979). "1978 Arkansas Elections – A compilation of Primary, Run-off and General Election Results for State & District Offices" (PDF). Secretary of State of Arkansas. Archived (PDF) from the original on July 11, 2021.
- Riviere, Paul (1982). "1980 Arkansas Elections – A Compilation of Primary, Run-off & General Election Results for State and District Offices" (PDF). Secretary of State of Arkansas. Archived (PDF) from the original on July 9, 2021.
- Riviere, Paul (1983). "1982 Arkansas Election – A Compilation of Primary, Run-off & General Election Results for State & District Offices" (PDF). Secretary of State of Arkansas. Archived (PDF) from the original on July 13, 2021.
- McCuen, W. J. "Bill" (1984). "Arkansas Election Result 1984" (PDF). Secretary of State of Arkansas. Archived (PDF) from the original on July 9, 2021.
- McCuen, W. J. "Bill" (1986). "Arkansas Election Result 1986" (PDF). Secretary of State of Arkansas. Archived (PDF) from the original on December 1, 2020.
- McCuen, W. J. "Bill" (1990). "Arkansas Election Results 1990" (PDF). Secretary of State of Arkansas. Archived (PDF) from the original on December 1, 2020.
- "Federal Election 92 – Election Results for the U.S. President, the U.S. Senate and the U.S. House of Representatives" (PDF). Federal Election Commission. 1993. Archived (PDF) from the original on March 21, 2021.
- "Federal Election 96 – Election Results for the U.S. President, the U.S. Senate and the U.S. House of Representatives" (PDF). Federal Election Commission. 1993. Archived (PDF) from the original on April 1, 2021.

=== Books ===
- Guide to U.S. Elections. SAGE Publications. 2009. ISBN 978-1-60426-536-1.
- Kelly, Michael (1999). Bill Clinton. Chelsea House Publishers. ISBN 978-0-7910-4700-2. LCCN 98013775. OL 354073M.
- Morris, Roger (1996). Partners in Power: The Clintons and their America. Henry Holt and Company. ISBN 978-0-8050-2804-1. LCCN 96017112. OL 22298101M.
- Hamilton, Nigel (2003). Bill Clinton: An American Journey. Random House. ISBN 978-0-375-50610-9. LCCN 2003046804. OL 3684943M.
- Maraniss, David (1996). First in His Class – The Biography of Bill Clinton. Simon & Schuster. ISBN 978-0-684-81890-0. LCCN 95044894. OL 26641524M.
- Harris, John F. (2005). The Survivor : Bill Clinton in The White House. Random House. ISBN 978-0-375-50847-9. OL 23273754M.
