= Electoral history of Al Gore =

Elections featuring US Vice President

Official portrait, 1994

Al Gore, the 45th vice president of the United States (1993–2001), has run for public office several times, beginning in 1976. He is a member of the Democratic Party, one of two major parties in the United States. Gore represented Tennessee's 4th (1977–1983) and 6th (1983–1985) congressional districts in the United States House of Representatives, and served as a U.S. senator from Tennessee (1984–1993).

Gore began his political career in 1976 by winning a crowded Democratic primary to win the chance to replace retiring Representative Joe L. Evins. Gore won the general election against independent William McGlamery. He won his second and fourth terms unopposed and his third by defeating Republican challenger James B. Seigneur. After serving four terms in the House, Gore defeated former Tennessee State Senator Victor Ashe to replace retiring Senate majority leader Republican Howard Baker. In 1988, he launched a bid for the Democratic nomination in the 1988 United States presidential election, losing to Massachusetts Governor Michael Dukakis. In 1990, he won a second term in the Senate in a landslide victory against Republican William R. Hawkins. In July 1992, Gore was tapped by Arkansas Governor Bill Clinton to be his running mate in the 1992 United States presidential election. The pair defeated Republican incumbents George H. W. Bush and Dan Quayle.

In 2000, Gore sought the presidency a second time. He won a sweeping victory in the 2000 Democratic Party presidential primaries against former Senator Bill Bradley. Despite winning the popular vote, Gore and his running mate, Connecticut Senator Joe Lieberman, narrowly lost the 2000 United States presidential election to the Republican ticket of Texas Governor George W. Bush and Dick Cheney. However, due to the close margin in Florida, the state that put Bush over the 270 electoral votes needed, a recount was ordered, which was later deemed unconstitutional by the Supreme Court in Bush v. Gore. Following the ruling, on December 13, Gore conceded the election.

== House of Representatives (1976–1982) ==
=== 1976 ===
After incumbent Representative Joe L. Evins announced that he would not seek another term, there was a highly contested primary to replace him. Nine different candidates sought the Democratic nomination. The primary race was close, with Gore and Tennessee House of Representatives Speaker Stanley Rogers emerging as the front runners. On the day of the primary, Gore narrowly defeated Rogers by less than four thousand votes.

The Republican Party did not run a candidate in the general election. Gore instead ran against William McGlamery, a member of the Libertarian Party, running as an independent candidate. McGlamery was relatively unknown, while Gore was the son of former Senator Albert Gore Sr. McGlamery did not actively campaign and only ran to prevent Gore from winning unopposed. On Election Day, Gore won in a landslide, receiving 94 percent of the vote.

1976 Tennessee's 4th congressional district election
Party	Candidate	Votes	%
Democratic	Al Gore	115,392	94.02%
Independent	William McGlamery	7,320	5.97%
Write-in		2	0.01%
Total votes		122,712	100.00%
Democratic hold			

=== 1978 ===
Gore ran for reelection in 1978; he was unopposed in both the Democratic primary and the general election. He received a little over ninety thousand votes. Fifty-four votes were cast for write-in candidates. On Election Day, Gore received over one hundred eight thousand votes.

1978 United States House of Representatives elections in Tennessee's 4th Congressional District Democratic Primary
Party	Candidate	Votes	%
Democratic	Al Gore (incumbent)	90,492	99.99%
Write-in		54	0.01%
Total votes		90,546	100.00%

1978 Tennessee's 4th congressional district election
Party	Candidate	Votes	%
Democratic	Al Gore (incumbent)	108,695	100.00%
Total votes		108,695	100.00%
Democratic hold			

=== 1980 ===
In 1980, Gore sought a third term, easily defeating primary challenger John L. Welker. He was challenged in the general election by Republican James B. Seigneur. Seigneur ran as he disliked the fact that Gore won unopposed in 1978; he criticized Gore's voting record, labeling it as "disgraceful". On Election Day, Gore received nearly 80 percent of the vote.

1980 United States House of Representatives elections in Tennessee's 4th Congressional District Democratic Primary
Party	Candidate	Votes	%
Democratic	Al Gore (incumbent)	64,631	90.76%
Democratic	John Welker	6,577	9.24%
Total votes		71,208	100.00%

1980 Tennessee's 4th congressional district election
Party	Candidate	Votes	%
Democratic	Al Gore (incumbent)	137,612	79.28%
Republican	James B. Seigneur	35,954	20.72%
Write-in		4	0.01%
Total votes		173,570	100.00%
Democratic hold			

=== 1982 ===
Following the redistricting mandated by the 1980 United States census, Gore was redistricted from Tennessee's 4th congressional district to the 6th congressional district. He did not face a challenger in the Democratic primary or in the general election. On Election Day, he won a fourth term in the House of Representatives. However, Gore received around thirty thousand fewer votes than he did in 1980.

1982 Tennessee's 6th congressional district election
Party	Candidate	Votes	%
Democratic	Al Gore (incumbent)	104,094	99.99%
Write-in		11	0.01%
Total votes		104,105	100.00%
Democratic hold			

== Senate (1984–1990) ==
=== 1984 ===
After four terms in the House of Representatives, Gore ran to replace retiring incumbent Republican Senate leader Howard Baker. He won the Democratic primary unopposed. Gore faced the Republican nominee, former State Senator Victor Ashe, in the general election. During the election, former President Gerald Ford campaigned for Ashe and stated that if elected Gore, would be a major problem for the Reagan administration. A debate between Ashe and Gore was held on October 8, 1984. Gore out-fundraised Ashe and on Election Day, he received almost twice as many votes in the general election. Gore became the first Senate candidate in Tennessee to receive over one million votes.

1984 United States Senate election in Tennessee
Party	Candidate	Votes	%
Democratic	Al Gore	1,000,607	60.72%
Republican	Victor Ashe	557,016	33.80%
Independent	Ed McAteer	87,234	5.29%
Independent	Khalil-Ullah Al-Muhaymin	3,179	0.19%
Total votes		1,648,036	100.00%
Democratic gain from Republican			

=== 1990 ===
After winning his first term in a landslide victory, Gore decided to run for a second. He was unopposed in the Democratic primary. Writing for The Commercial Appeal, Terry Keeter credited the lack of competition to the margin of Gore's victory in the 1984 senate election. Gore received almost 480 thousand votes with 54 votes cast for write-in candidates.

1990 United States Senate election in Tennessee Democratic Primary
Party	Candidate	Votes	%
Democratic	Al Gore (incumbent)	479,961	99.99%
Write-in		54	0.01%
Total votes		480,015	100.00%

County results Gore: 50–60% 60–70% 70–80% 80–90%

The election was held on November 6, 1990. The staff of The Jackson Sun characterized Tennessee's election cycle as boring, noting the likelihood of Gore being reelected, writing that "the gubernatorial and senatorial races are a yawn". Republican Representative Don Sundquist felt that Hawkins was a weak candidate and that Republicans would likely have better results in future cycles. Gore, like most incumbents in the 1990 United States Senate elections, was reelected to another term. He won in a landslide, receiving over 67 percent of the vote, an improvement on his previous margin of victory.

After being elected Vice President in the 1992 presidential election, Gore was required to resign from the Senate. On December 29, 1992, Governor Ned McWherter revealed he would appoint Harlan Mathews to replace him. Gore left the Senate on January 2, 1993. In the 1994 special election for the seat, the remainder of Gore's term was won by Republican Fred Thompson, who defeated the Democratic nominee, Representative Jim Cooper of Tennessee's 4th congressional district.

1990 United States Senate election in Tennessee
Party	Candidate	Votes	%
Democratic	Al Gore (incumbent)	529,914	67.72%
Republican	William R. Hawkins	233,324	29.92%
Independent	Bill Jacox	11,172	1.43%
Independent	Charles Gordon Vick	7,995	1.02%
Write-in		109	0.01%
Total votes		782,514	100.00%
Democratic hold			

== Presidential elections (1988, 1992–2000) ==
=== 1988 Democratic primary ===
In April 1987, Gore, then in his first Senate term, declared his intentions to run for president. He told his father, Albert Gore Sr., that he decided to run as he felt the Democratic party needed new leadership and that they had become too liberal. He heavily criticized fellow Southerner Jesse Jackson and Massachusetts Governor Michael Dukakis, leading to backlash from his fellow Democrats. Jackson defeated Gore in the South Carolina primary, receiving over twice as many votes. Gore hoped to make up for his loss on Super Tuesday. On Super Tuesday, he and Jackson split the Southern vote, with Jackson winning five states and Gore winning six.

Gore ended his campaign following his defeat in the New York primary. Dukakis won the contest with 51% of the vote, followed by Jackson and Gore at 37% and 10% respectively. The New York Times attributed his defeat to his attacks against Jackson and Dukakis, as well as for accepting an endorsement from New York City mayor Ed Koch, harmed his support with black voters. The nomination was won by Dukakis, who lost the general election to Republican George H. W. Bush. In 1989, Gore stated he would not seek the presidency in 1992.

=== 1992 ===
==== Nomination ====
Following his victory in the 1992 Democratic Party presidential primaries, Arkansas Governor Bill Clinton considered around forty different politicians to be his running mate. His shortlist consisted of Gore, Senators Bob Graham of Florida, Bob Kerrey of Nebraska, Jay Rockefeller of West Virginia, and Harris Wofford of Pennsylvania, as well as Representative Lee Hamilton of Indiana's 4th congressional district. The two finalists were Gore and Hamilton; however Gore became the favorite after Hamilton made an appearance on Meet the Press, where he stated his opposition to abortion and parental leave. According to Clinton's advisors, he chose Gore as he saw his 1988 bid as proof that he could run a national campaign. On July 8, 1992, Clinton offered him the Democratic nomination for the vice presidency. Clinton announced his running mate at the Arkansas Governor's Mansion; during his speech, he emphasized Gore's work in protecting the environment and foreign policy. He accepted the nomination, and on July 16, and was formerly nominated at the 1992 Democratic National Convention by a voice vote.

==== General election ====
Electoral College map of the 1992 presidential election

In the general election, Clinton and Gore faced incumbent Republicans George H. W. Bush and Dan Quayle. Additionally, independent businessman Ross Perot ran a third party campaign. On Election Day, Clinton and Gore defeated both the Bush-Quayle and Perot-Stockdale tickets. The Clinton-Gore ticket was the youngest presidential ticket ever elected to the presidency.

1992 United States presidential election
Candidate	Running mate	Party	Popular vote		Electoral vote	
Candidate	Running mate	Party	Votes	%	Votes	%
Bill Clinton	Al Gore	Democratic	44,909,806	43.02	370	68.77
George H. W. Bush	Dan Quayle	Republican	39,104,550	37.46	168	31.23
Ross Perot	James Stockdale	Independent politician	19,743,821	18.91	0	0.00
Andre Marrou	Nancy Lord	Libertarian	290,087	0.28	0	0.00
Bo Gritz	Cyril Minett	Populist	104,014	0.10	0	0.00
Lenora Fulani	Maria Muñoz	New Alliance	73,952	0.07	0	0.00
Others			171,733	0.16	0	0.00
Total			104,397,963	100.00	538	100.00

=== 1996 ===
==== Nomination ====
Clinton and Gore were renominated at the 1996 Democratic National Convention. During his acceptance speech, Gore spoke about his sister, Nancy Gore Hunger, and her death from smoking. He also criticized Republican efforts to restrict abortion and cut education funding.

==== General election ====
Electoral College map of the 1996 presidential election

In the general election, Clinton and Gore faced Republican challengers Republican Senate Majority Leader Bob Dole of Kansas and Jack Kemp of New York, former United States Secretary of Housing and Urban Development under George H. W. Bush. On Election Day, the Clinton-Gore ticket defeated the Dole-Kemp ticket by around eight million votes.

1996 United States presidential election
Candidate	Running mate	Party	Popular vote		Electoral vote	
Candidate	Running mate	Party	Votes	%	Votes	%
Bill Clinton	Al Gore	Democratic	47,400,125	48.73	379	70.45
Bob Dole	Jack Kemp	Republican	39,198,755	40.30	159	29.55
Ross Perot	Pat Choate	Reform	8,085,402	8.31	0	0.00
Ralph Nader	Winona LaDuke	Green	685,436	0.70	0	0.00
Harry Browne	Jo Jorgensen	Libertarian	485,798	0.50	0	0.00
Howard Phillips	Herbert Titus	U.S. Taxpayers	184,820	0.19	0	0.00
Others			1,235,305	1.27	0	0.00
Total			97,275,641	100.00	538	100.00

=== 2000 ===
==== Nomination ====
Results of the 2000 Democratic Primary Al Gore

Following the 1996 Democratic National Convention, many felt Gore was likely to run for president in 2000. Jef McAllister of Time described a hypothetical Gore campaign as "inevitable". He formally announced his bid for the presidency on June 16, 1999. Gore's only opposition came from Bill Bradley, a former Senator from New Jersey. On February 22, 2000, Bradley and Gore participated in a debate at the Apollo Theater. Gore began the Democratic primary with a strong victory in the Iowa Caucus. Following Super Tuesday, Bradley conceded the primary and congratulated Gore on his victory. Gore swept every single state and territory.

In August 2000, Gore selected Senator Joe Lieberman of Connecticut as his running mate. Reportedly, Gore's shortlist also included Senators Evan Bayh of Indiana, John Edwards of North Carolina, and John Kerry of Massachusetts, alongside New Hampshire Governor Jeanne Shaheen and House Minority Leader Dick Gephardt of Missouri's 3rd congressional district. Additionally, Bradley was also considered with Gore describing him as a "wild card that I haven't completely eliminated." The selection of Lieberman, a harsh critic of the Clinton Administration. was seen as an attempt by Gore to distance himself from Clinton. On August 17, the two received the Democratic Party's nomination at the 2000 Democratic National Convention. Gore received 4,328 delegate votes with 9 delegates abstaining.

2000 Democratic Party presidential primaries
Party	Candidate	Votes	%
Democratic	Al Gore	10,929,429	75.38
Democratic	Bill Bradley	3,035,979	20.96
Democratic	Lyndon LaRouche	278,201	1.91
Democratic	Uncommitted	207,883	1.44
Democratic	Other	46,688	0.32
Total votes		14,443,188	100.00%

2000 Democratic National Convention, Presidential tally
Party	Candidate	Votes	%
Democratic	Al Gore	4,328	99.79%
Democratic	(abstention)	9	0.21%
Total votes		4,337	100.00%

==== General election ====
Electoral college map of the 2000 presidential election

In the general election, Gore and Lieberman faced Texas Governor George W. Bush and Dick Cheney, United States Secretary of Defense under George H. W. Bush. Despite winning the popular vote, Gore narrowly lost the state of Florida, putting Bush just over the 270 electoral votes required to win the presidency. Gore initially gave a concession speech; he retracted it after a recount was ordered. However, the Supreme Court's 5–4 decision in Bush v. Gore ruled the recount unconstitutional, saying it violated the Equal Protection Clause of the United States Constitution. On December 13, Gore conceded a second time. Some Democrats attributed Gore's loss to the presence of third party candidate Ralph Nader of the Green Party causing a "spoiler effect" which detracted from Gore's vote count in Florida and New Hampshire. His loss has also been attributed to the potentially misleading design of the butterfly ballots used in Palm Beach County, Florida, which heavily leans toward the Democrats, causing Gore voters to accidentally vote for Reform Party candidate Pat Buchanan.

2000 United States presidential election
Candidate	Running mate	Party	Popular vote		Electoral vote	
Candidate	Running mate	Party	Votes	%	Votes	%
George W. Bush	Dick Cheney	Republican	50,462,412	47.87	271	50.47
Al Gore	Joe Lieberman	Democratic	51,009,810	48.38	266	49.53
Ralph Nader	Winona LaDuke	Green	2,883,443	2.74	0	0.00
Pat Buchanan	Ezola Foster	Reform	449,181	0.43	0	0.00
Harry Browne	Art Olivier	Libertarian	384,532	0.36	0	0.00
Howard Phillips	Curtis Frazier	Constitution	98,027	0.09	0	0.00
Others			138,580	0.13	0	0.00
Total			105,425,985	100.00	537	100.00

Note: A faithless elector from Washington, D.C. abstained from voting in protest.
