= Electoral history of John Kerry =

Elections featuring American politician

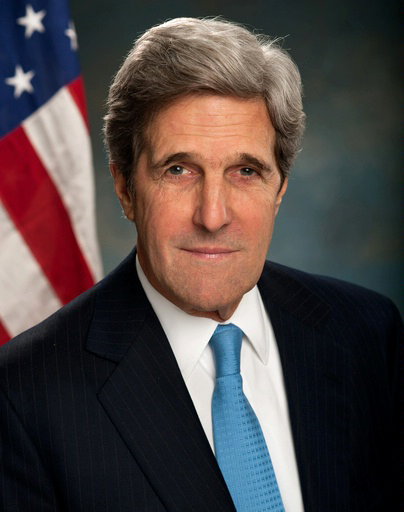
Former Secretary of State John Forbes Kerry

The electoral history of John Kerry, Lieutenant Governor of Massachusetts (1983–1985), United States Senator (1985–2013), United States Secretary of State (2013–2017), and the 2004 Democratic presidential nominee.

== U.S. House of Representatives election ==
=== 1972 ===
1972 Massachusetts's 5th congressional district Democratic primary
Party	Candidate	Votes	%
Democratic	John Kerry	20,771	27.56%
Democratic	Paul J. Sheehy	15,641	20.75%
Democratic	Anthony R. DiFruscia	12,222	16.22%
Democratic	John J. Desmond	10,213	13.55%
Democratic	Robert B. Kennedy	5,632	7.47%
Democratic	Frederick J. Finnegan	2,558	3.39%
Democratic	Glenn M. Cooper	2,282	3.03%
Democratic	Daniel P. Kiley	2,221	2.95%
Democratic	Helen G. Droney	2,124	2.82%
Democratic	Richard Williams	1,706	2.26%
Total votes		75,370	100.00%

1972 Massachusetts's 5th congressional district election
Party	Candidate	Votes	%
Republican	Paul W. Cronin	110,970	53.45%
Democratic	John Kerry	92,847	44.72%
Independent	Roger P. Durkin	3,803	1.83%
Total votes		207,620	100.00%
Republican hold			

== Massachusetts gubernatorial election ==
=== 1982 ===
Primary results by municipality

1982 Massachusetts lieutenant gubernatorial Democratic primary
Party	Candidate	Votes	%
Democratic	John Kerry	325,890	29.00%
Democratic	Evelyn Murphy	286,378	25.48%
Democratic	Samuel Rotondi	228,086	20.29%
Democratic	Lou Nickinello	150,829	13.42%
Democratic	Lois Pines	132,734	11.81%
Total votes		1,123,917	100.00%

Election results by municipality

1982 Massachusetts gubernatorial election
Party	Candidate	Votes	%
Democratic	Michael Dukakis / John Kerry	1,219,109	59.48%
Republican	John W. Sears / Leon Lombardi	749,679	36.57%
Independent	Frank Rich / John Davies	63,068	3.08%
Libertarian	Rebecca Shipman / Norman MacConnell	17,918	0.87%
Total votes		2,049,774	100.00%
Democratic hold			

== U.S. Senate elections ==
=== 1984 ===
1984 United States Senate election in Massachusetts Democratic primary
Party	Candidate	Votes	%
Democratic	John Kerry	322,470	40.83%
Democratic	James Michael Shannon	297,941	37.72%
Democratic	David M. Bartley	85,910	10.88%
Democratic	Michael Joseph Connolly	82,999	10.51
Democratic	Others	502	0.06%
Total votes		789,822	100.00%

Election results by municipality

1984 United States Senate election in Massachusetts
Party	Candidate	Votes	%
Democratic	John Kerry	1,393,150	55.05%
Republican	Ray Shamie	1,136,913	44.93%
Write-in		408	0.02%
Total votes		2,530,471	100.00%
Democratic hold			

=== 1990 ===
Election results by municipality

1990 United States Senate election in Massachusetts
Party	Candidate	Votes	%
Democratic	John Kerry (incumbent)	1,321,712	54.51%
Republican	Jim Rappaport	992,917	40.95%
Independent	David Pover	109,950	4.54%
Total votes		2,424,579	100.00%
Democratic hold			

=== 1996 ===
1996 United States Senate election in Massachusetts Democratic primary
Party	Candidate	Votes	%
Democratic	John Kerry (incumbent)	221,213	98.62%
Write-in		3,095	1.38%
Total votes		224,308	100.00%

Election results by municipality

1996 United States Senate election in Massachusetts
Party	Candidate	Votes	%
Democratic	John Kerry (incumbent)	1,334,345	52.21%
Republican	Bill Weld	1,142,837	44.71%
Conservative	Susan Gallagher	70,013	2.74%
Natural Law	Richard Stone	7,176	0.28%
Write-in		1,515	0.06%
Total votes		2,555,886	100.00%
Democratic hold			

=== 2002 ===
2002 United States Senate election in Massachusetts Democratic primary
Party	Candidate	Votes	%
Democratic	John Kerry (incumbent)	615,517	99.36%
Write-in		3,979	0.64%
Total votes		619,496	100.00%

Election results by municipality

2002 United States Senate election in Massachusetts
Party	Candidate	Votes	%	±%
Democratic	John Kerry (incumbent)	1,605,976	72.33%	
Libertarian	Michael Cloud	369,807	16.66%	
Independent	Randall Forsberg (write-in)	24,898	1.12%	
	All others	6,077	0.27%	
	Blank / Scattering	213,543	9.62%	
Total votes		2,220,301	100%	

=== 2008 ===
2008 United States Senate election in Massachusetts Democratic primary
Party	Candidate	Votes	%
Democratic	John Kerry (incumbent)	342,446	68.85%
Democratic	Edward O'Reilly	154,395	31.04%
Write-in		538	0.11%
Total votes		497,379	100.00%

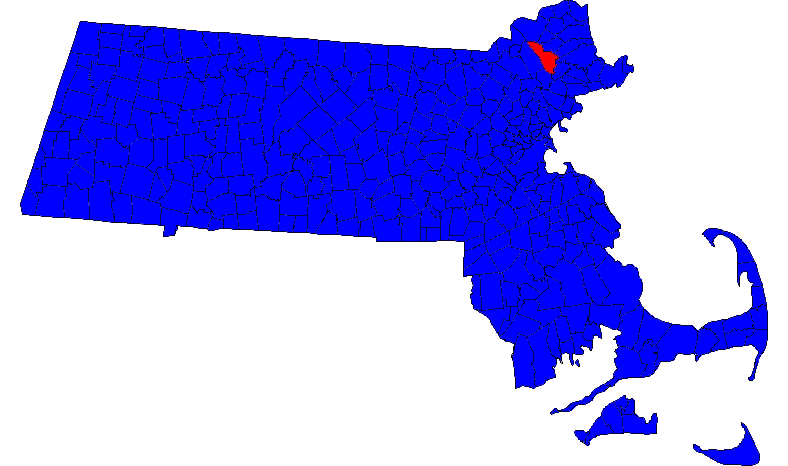
Election results by municipality

2008 United States Senate election in Massachusetts
Party	Candidate	Votes	%
Democratic	John Kerry (incumbent)	1,971,974	65.84%
Republican	Jeff Beatty	926,044	30.92%
Libertarian	Robert Underwood	93,713	3.13%
Write-in		3,516	0.12%
Total votes		2,995,247	100.00%
Democratic hold			

== Presidential election ==
=== 2004 ===
Primary results by state and territory John Kerry (52) John Edwards (2) Howard Dean (1) Wesley Clark (1)

2004 Democratic Party presidential primaries
Party	Candidate	Votes	%
Democratic	John Kerry	10,045,891	60.75%
Democratic	John Edwards	3,207,048	19.39%
Democratic	Howard Dean	937,015	5.67%
Democratic	Dennis Kucinich	643,067	3.89%
Democratic	Wesley Clark	572,207	3.46%
Democratic	Al Sharpton	383,683	2.32%
Democratic	Uncommitted	155,388	0.94%
Democratic	Others	591,524	3.58%
Total votes		16,535,823	100.00%

2004 Democratic National Convention, Presidential tally
Party	Candidate	Votes	%
Democratic	John Kerry	4,253	98.40%
Democratic	Dennis Kucinich	43	0.99%
Democratic	(not voting)	26	0.60%
Total votes		4,322	100.00%

2004 Independence Party of Minnesota presidential caucus
Party	Candidate	Votes	%
Independence	John Edwards	335	41.10%
Independence	John Kerry	149	18.28%
Independence	George W. Bush (incumbent)	94	11.53%
Independence	Ralph Nader	78	9.57%
Independence	None of the above	66	8.10%
Independence	Dennis Kucinich	40	4.91%
Independence	Lorna Salzman	9	1.10%
Independence	John McCain	9	1.10%
Independence	Al Sharpton	5	0.61%
Independence	Others	34	4.15%
Total votes		819	100.00%

2004 Independence Party of New York presidential convention
Party	Candidate	Votes	%
Independence	Ralph Nader	623,931	95.40%
Independence	John Kerry	26,161	4.00%
Independence	George W. Bush (incumbent)	2,616	0.40%
Independence	David Cobb	1,308	0.20%
Total votes		654,016	100.00%

2004 Electoral college results Bush: 286 votes (31 states) Kerry: 251 votes (19 states + DC) Edwards: 1 vote

2004 United States presidential election
Party	Candidate	Votes	%
Republican	George W. Bush / Dick Cheney (inc.)	62,040,610	50.73%
Democratic	John Kerry / John Edwards	59,028,444	48.27%
Independent	Ralph Nader / Peter Camejo	465,650	0.38%
Libertarian	Michael Badnarik / Richard Campagna	397,265	0.32%
Constitution	Michael Peroutka / Chuck Baldwin	143,630	0.12%
Green	David Cobb / Pat LaMarche	119,859	0.10%
	Others	95,172	0.08%
Total votes		122,295,345	100.00%
Republican hold			

== See also ==
- Electoral history of George W. Bush
- Electoral history of Al Gore
- Electoral history of Barack Obama
- Electoral history of Bill Clinton
- Electoral history of Hillary Clinton
- Electoral history of Joe Biden
- Electoral history of John Edwards
- Electoral history of Kamala Harris
