= Electoral history of Joe Lieberman =

Elections featuring American politician

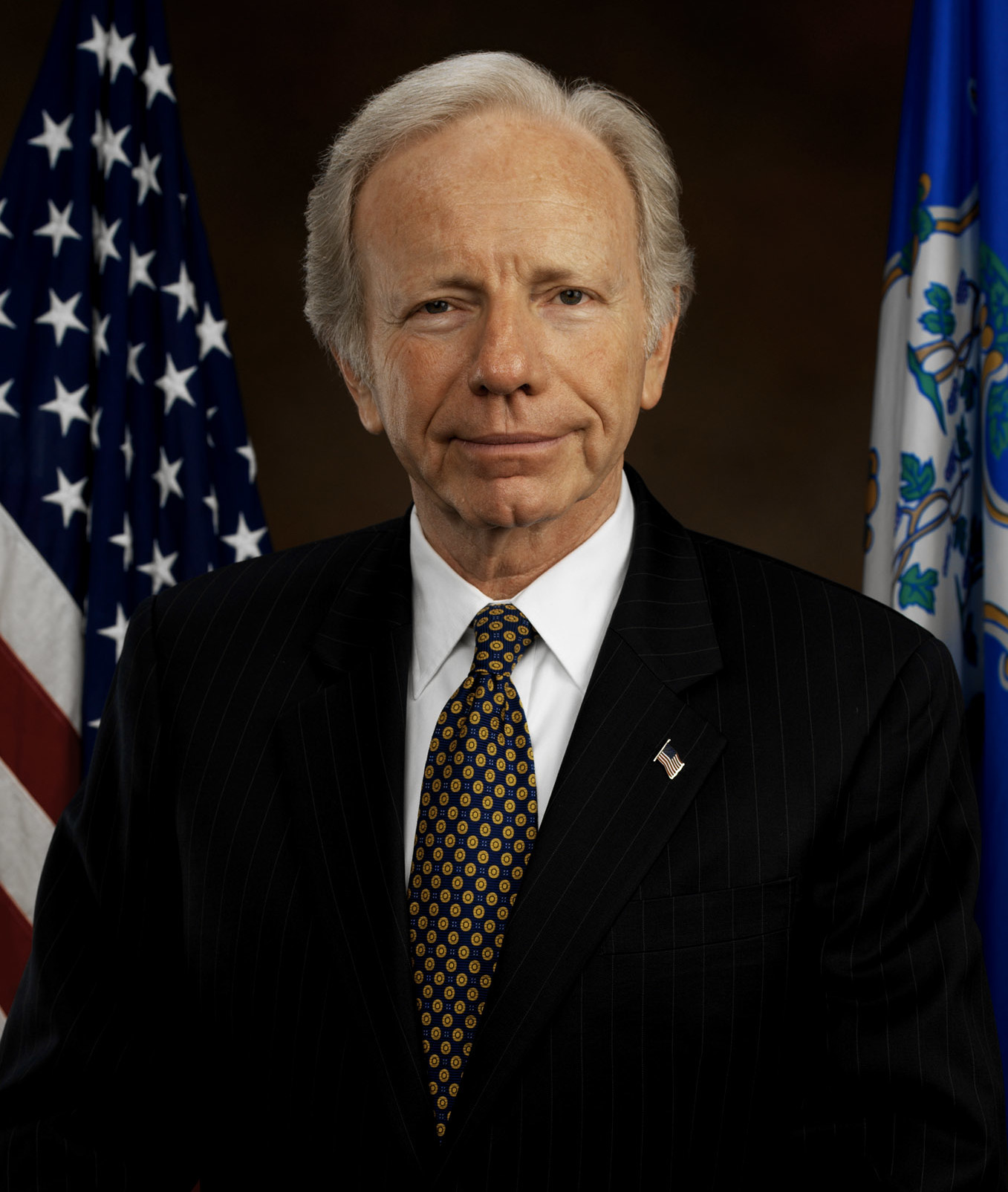

Joe Lieberman (February 24, 1942 – March 27, 2024) was an American politician, having served as a United States Senator from Connecticut from 1989 to 2013. A former member of the Democratic Party, he was the party's nominee for Vice President in the 2000 election. Later on, he became an independent.

== Connecticut State Senate elections ==
Connecticut's 11th state senate district, 1970:

- Joe Lieberman (D) - 14,956 (69.65%)
- Daniel C. Perrotto (R) - 6,516 (30.35%)

Connecticut's 10th state senate district, 1972:

- Joe Lieberman (D) (inc.) - 19,548 (63.09%)
- Clarence M. Whitney (R) - 11,434 (36.91%)

Connecticut's 10th state senate district, 1974:

- Joe Lieberman (D) (inc.) - 16,221 (74.53%)
- Joseph F. Paceoni Jr. (R) - 5,543 (25.47%)

Connecticut's 10th state senate district, 1976:

- Joe Lieberman (D) (inc.) - 19,240 (68.56%)
- Dorothy P. Mendygral (R) - 8,825 (31.44%)

Connecticut's 10th state senate district, 1978:

- Joe Lieberman (D) (inc.) - 14,741 (75.44%)
- Edward Williams (R) - 4,798 (24.56%)

== 1980 congressional election ==
Connecticut's 3rd congressional district, 1980:

- Lawrence DeNardis (R) - 117,024 (52.33%)
- Joe Lieberman (D) - 103,903 (46.46%)
- Joelle Fishman (Citizens) - 2,711 (1.21%)
- Write-in - 10 (0.00%)

== Connecticut Attorney General elections ==
1982 Connecticut Attorney General election:

- Joe Lieberman (D) - 601,711 (58.14%)
- William H. Champlin III (R) - 424,961 (41.06%)
- Vincent Stuart Triola (Libertarian) - 8,351 (0.81%)

1986 Connecticut Attorney General election:

- Joe Lieberman (D) (inc.) - 613,742 (64.68%)
- Richard E. Arnold (R) - 335,209 (35.32%)

== U.S. Senate elections (1988-2000) ==
United States Senate election in Connecticut, 1988:

- Joe Lieberman (D) - 688,499 (49.76%)
- Lowell P. Weicker Jr. (R) (inc.) - 678,454 (49.04%)
- Howard A. Grayson Jr. (LBT) - 12,409 (0.90%)
- Melissa M. Fisher (New Alliance) - 4,154 (0.30%)
- Others - 10 (0.00%)

United States Senate election in Connecticut, 1994:

- Joe Lieberman (D/A Connecticut Party) (inc.) - 723,842 (67.04%)
- Jerry Labriola (R) - 334,833 (31.01%)
- Bruce Johnson (Concerned Citizens) - 20,989 (1.94%)

United States Senate election in Connecticut, 2000:

- Joe Lieberman (D) (inc.) - 828,902 (63.21%)
- Philip A. Giordano (R) - 448,077 (34.17%)
- William Kozak Jr. (Concerned Citizens) - 25,509 (1.95%)
- Wildey J. Moore (LBT) - 8,773 (0.67%)

== Presidential politics ==
2000 Democratic National Convention (Vice Presidential tally):

- Joe Lieberman - 4,337 (100.00%)

2000 United States presidential election:

- George W. Bush/Dick Cheney (R) - 50,460,110 (47.9%) and 271 electoral votes (30 states carried)
- Al Gore/Joe Lieberman (D) - 51,003,926 (48.4%) and 266 electoral votes (20 states and D.C. carried)
- Abstaining - 1 electoral vote (Washington, D.C. faithless elector)
- Ralph Nader/Winona LaDuke (Green) - 2,883,105 (2.7%)
- Pat Buchanan/Ezola Foster (Reform) - 449,225 (0.4%)
- Harry Browne/Art Olivier (Libertarian) - 384,516 (0.4%)
- Howard Phillips/Curtis Frazier (Constitution) - 98,022 (0.1%)
- John Hagelin/Nat Goldhaber (Natural Law) - 83,702 (0.1%)
- Others - 54,652 (0.1%)

2004 Democratic presidential primaries:

- John Kerry - 9,930,497 (60.98%)
- John Edwards - 3,162,337 (19.42%)
- Howard Dean - 903,460 (5.55%)
- Dennis Kucinich - 620,242 (3.81%)
- Wesley Clark - 547,369 (3.36%)
- Al Sharpton - 380,865 (2.34%)
- Joe Lieberman - 280,940 (1.73%)
- Uncommitted - 157,953 (0.97%)
- Lyndon LaRouche - 103,731 (0.64%)
- Carol Moseley Braun - 98,469 (0.61%)
- Dick Gephardt - 63,902 (0.39%)
- Scattering - 12,525 (0.08%)

== 2006 U.S. Senate election ==
Connecticut Democratic Senatorial Convention, May 20, 2006:

- Joe Lieberman (inc.) - 1,004 (66.53%)
- Ned Lamont - 505 (33.47%)

Democratic primary for the United States Senate from Connecticut, August 8, 2006:

- Ned Lamont - 146,587 (51.79%)
- Joe Lieberman (inc.) - 136,468 (48.21%)

United States Senate election in Connecticut, 2006:

- Joe Lieberman (Connecticut for Lieberman) (inc.) - 564,095 (49.71%)
- Ned Lamont (D) - 450,844 (39.73%)
- Alan Schlesinger (R) - 109,198 (9.62%)
- Ralph Ferrucci (Green) - 5,922 (0.52%)
- Timothy A. Knibbs (Concerned Citizens) - 4,638 (0.41%)
- Carl E. Vassar (I) (write-in) - 80 (0.01%)

== See also ==
- Electoral history of Al Gore
- Electoral history of Bill Clinton
- Electoral history of Dick Cheney
- Electoral history of George W. Bush
- Electoral history of John Edwards
- Electoral history of John Kerry
- Electoral history of Kamala Harris
