= 1982 Massachusetts gubernatorial election =

- November 2, 1982
- Turnout: 82.51% ▲3.54

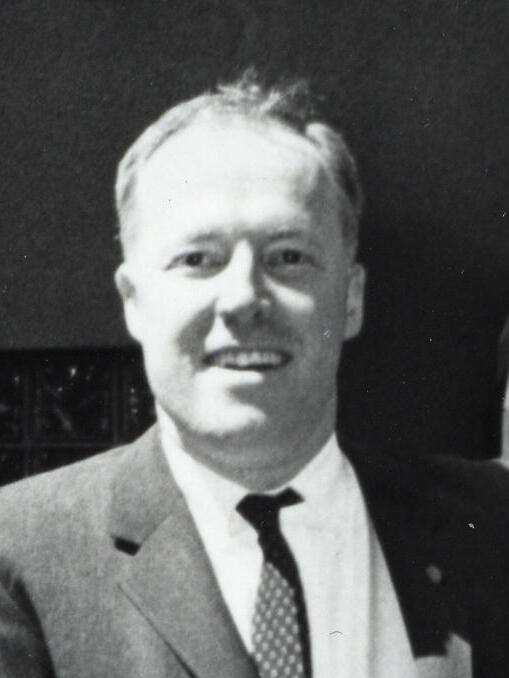
Nominee	Michael Dukakis	John W. Sears
Party	Democratic	Republican
Running mate	John Kerry	Leon Lombardi
Popular vote	1,219,109	749,679
Percentage	59.48%	36.57%
- Dukakis: 40–50% 50–60% 60–70% 70–80% 80–90% Sears: 40–50% 50–60% 60–70% 70–80%
Governor before election
Edward J. King
Democratic
Elected Governor
Michael Dukakis
Democratic

The 1982 Massachusetts gubernatorial election was held on November 2, 1982. Michael Dukakis was elected to a second non-consecutive term. He beat Republican John W. Sears in the general election, after defeating incumbent Governor Edward J. King in the Democratic primary.

This election notably saw the Dukakis-Kerry ticket for governor and lieutenant governor, a gubernatorial ticket made up of the future 1988 and 2004 Democratic nominees for president of the United States, who both lost to Bush family members, George H. W. and George W., respectively. Republican candidate Andrew Card also went on to serve in key roles in both Bush administrations, as White House deputy chief of staff, transportation secretary, and White House chief of staff.

== Democratic primary ==
=== Governor ===
==== Candidates ====
- Michael Dukakis, former governor
- Edward J. King, incumbent governor

===== Withdrew =====
- Thomas P. O'Neill III, incumbent lieutenant governor

==== Campaign ====
Former Governor Michael Dukakis challenged incumbent Governor Edward J. King in a rematch of the 1978 Democratic primary. This time, Dukakis was victorious, 53–47%.

==== Results ====

1982 Massachusetts Democratic gubernatorial primary
Party	Candidate	Votes	%	±%
Democratic	Michael Dukakis	631,911	53.49%	▲11.29
Democratic	Edward J. King (incumbent)	549,335	46.50%	▼4.57
Total votes		1,181,246	100.00%	

=== Lt. Governor ===
==== Candidates ====
- John Kerry, veteran and anti-war activist
- Evelyn Murphy, chair of the National Advisory Committee on Oceans and Atmosphere and former state secretary of Economic Affairs
- Lou Nickinello, state representative from Natick
- Lois Pines, former state representative from Newton
- Samuel Rotondi, state senator from Winchester

==== Campaign ====
Incumbent Lt. Governor Thomas P. O'Neill III did not run for re-election. Former Navy lieutenant and anti-war activist John Kerry won a five-way contest for the Democratic nomination.

==== Results ====
Primary results by municipality

1982 Massachusetts Democratic lt. gubernatorial primary
Party	Candidate	Votes	%
Democratic	John Kerry	325,890	29.00%
Democratic	Evelyn Murphy	286,378	25.48%
Democratic	Samuel Rotondi	228,086	20.29%
Democratic	Lou Nickinello	150,829	13.42%
Democratic	Lois Pines	132,734	11.81%
Total votes		1,123,917	100.00%

== Republican primary ==
=== Governor ===
==== Candidates ====
- Andrew Card, state representative from Holbrook
- John Lakian, businessman
- John Winthrop Sears, former Suffolk County sheriff and Boston city councilman

==== Campaign ====
Lakian, a political newcomer, was the early favorite for the nomination after securing the Republican Party endorsement at the state convention. However, The Boston Globe published a damaging story questioning elements of Lakian's biography, claiming that he had made several exaggerations with respect to his record. After losing the primary, Lakian sued the paper.

==== Results ====
Republican primary results by municipality

1982 Massachusetts Republican gubernatorial primary
Party	Candidate	Votes	%
Republican	John W. Sears	90,617	50.71%
Republican	John Lakian	46,675	26.12%
Republican	Andrew Card	40,899	22.95%
Total votes		178,191	100.00%

=== Lt. Governor ===
==== Candidates ====
- Leon Lombardi, state representative from Easton

==== Results ====
Lombardi was unopposed for the Republican nomination.

== General election ==
=== Results ===
Michael Dukakis won the election with 57.9% of the vote, winning every county in the state - 13 with a majority, and one (Barnstable) with a plurality.

1982 Massachusetts gubernatorial election
Party	Candidate	Votes	%	±%
Democratic	Michael Dukakis (John Kerry)	1,219,109	59.48%	▲6.97
Republican	John W. Sears (Leon Lombardi)	749,679	36.57%	▼10.62
Independent	Frank Rich (John Davies)	63,068	3.08%	N/A
Libertarian	Rebecca Shipman (Norman MacConnell, Jr.)	17,918	0.87%	N/A
Majority		469,430	22.91%	

=== Results by county ===
1982 United States gubernatorial election in Massachusetts (by county)
County	Dukakis - D %	Dukakis - D #	Sears - R %	Sears - R #	Others %	Others #	Total #
Barnstable	49.8%	33,942	47.5%	32,379	2.7%	1,899	68,220
Berkshire	63.6%	32,453	32.5%	16,585	3.9%	1,995	51,033
Bristol	62.2%	96,602	33.8%	52,658	4.0%	6,177	155,737
Dukes	62.9%	2,698	33.9%	1,453	3.3%	141	4,292
Essex	58.7%	143,900	37.4%	91,633	3.9%	9,617	245,150
Franklin	56.1%	13,765	40.5%	9,937	3.5%	853	24,555
Hampden	55.7%	77,183	36.4%	50,391	7.9%	10,973	138,547
Hampshire	61.7%	29,355	34.3%	16,332	4.1%	1,903	47,589
Middlesex	61.5%	319,453	35.1%	182,483	3.4%	17,680	519,616
Nantucket	54.7%	1,252	42.4%	970	2.9%	66	2,288
Norfolk	57.6%	143,940	38.6%	96,519	3.8%	9,466	249,927
Plymouth	52.7%	73,570	43.2%	60,250	4.1%	5,773	139,593
Suffolk	65.9%	117,525	29.7%	52,884	4.4%	7,861	178,270
Worcester	59.1%	133,171	37.8%	85,205	3.1%	7,061	225,437

Counties that flipped from Republican to Democratic

- Barnstable
- Berkshire
- Dukes
- Franklin
- Hampden
- Hampshire
- Nantucket

== See also ==
- 1981–1982 Massachusetts legislature
