= Leslie Marshall (writer) =

American journalist

- Born: 1953 (age 72–73); Washington, D.C., U.S.
- Education: National Cathedral School; Bryn Mawr College (BA)
- Occupations: Journalist; magazine editor; novelist
- Spouse(s): Dominic Bradlee (divorced 1998) Bill Weld (m. 2003)
- Children: 3

Leslie Marshall Weld (born 1953) is an American journalist, magazine editor, and novelist.

== Early life and education ==
Marshall was born in 1953 in Washington, D.C., and attended the National Cathedral School. She completed a bachelor of arts at Bryn Mawr College.

== Career ==
Marshall has worked as a magazine writer and novelist. She was a reporter for The Washington Post. Marshall has written for Real Simple, and O, The Oprah Magazine. She was a contributing editor for InStyle.

Marshall is the author of the 2004 novel, A Girl Could Stand Up.

== Personal life ==
Marshall is the mother of three children, twins Josephine and Beatrice, and son Marshall, from her first marriage to Dominic "Dino" Bradlee, son of Washington Post editor Ben Bradlee. They divorced in 1998.

On June 14, 2003, Marshall married Bill Weld, the former Governor of Massachusetts, a longtime friend and neighbor, on the lawn of their beach house in Bellport, New York. The newlyweds, with Marshall's 12-year-old twin girls and 9-year-old son lived in an apartment on the Upper East Side of Manhattan, in her summer house on the Beaver Kill river and his summer house near the Ausable Club in the Adirondacks. During their marriage, Weld ran, unsuccessfully, for Governor of New York on the Republican ticket, and for Vice President of the United States on the Libertarian ticket. Marshall campaigned with and for her husband in both races. In 2006, Marshall and Maggie Brooks were co-chairwomen of the "Women for Weld" initiative. In contrast to Susan Roosevelt Weld, Marshall "embraces" political life.

== See also ==
- Weld family
