= Electoral history of John Edwards =

Overview of John Edward's electoral history

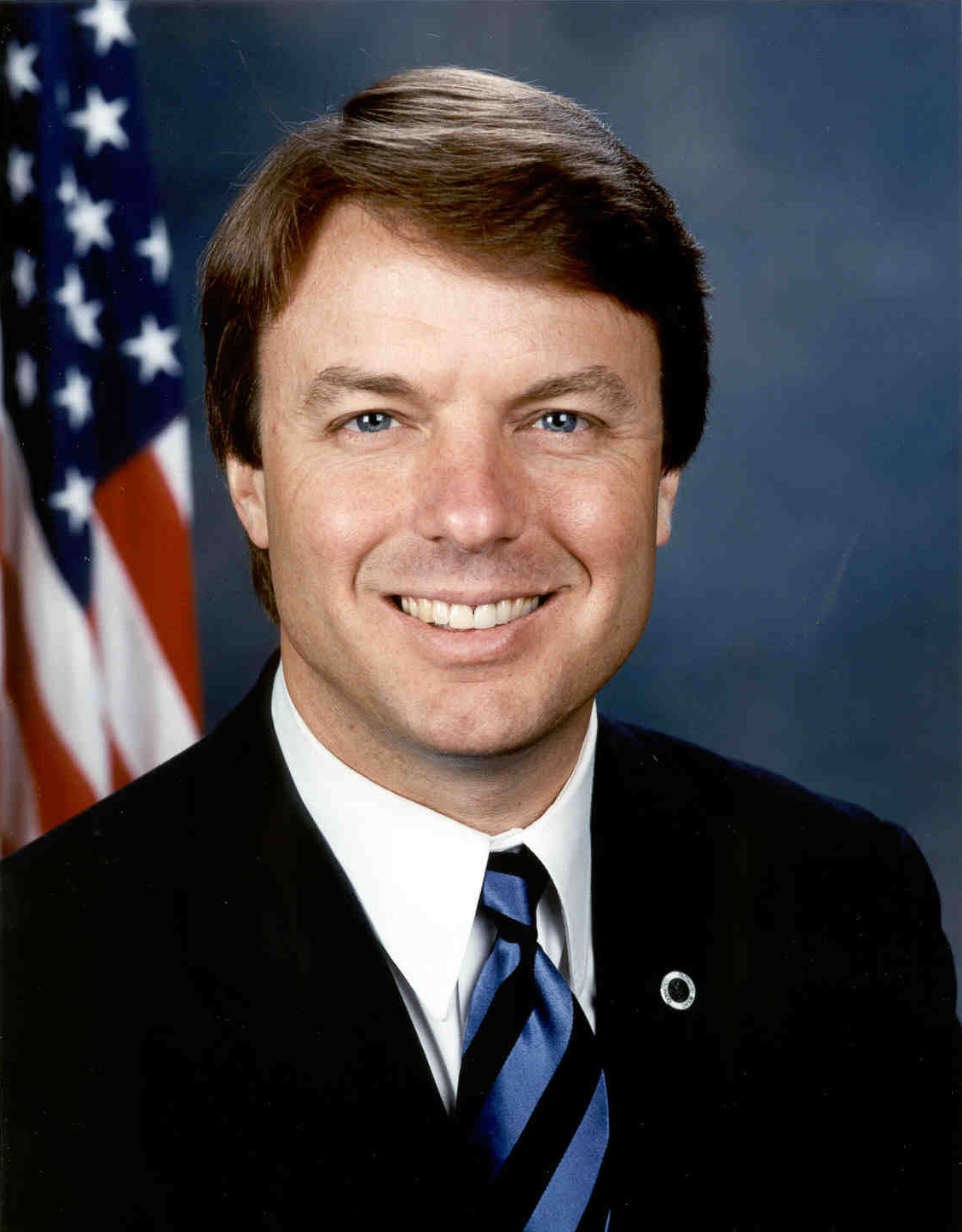
Former Senator John Edwards (D-NC)

Electoral history of John Edwards, United States Senator from North Carolina (1999-2005), 2004 Democratic Vice Presidential nominee and candidate for Democratic Presidential nomination in 2004 and 2008

Democratic Primary for the United States Senate from North Carolina, 1998:

- John Edwards - 277,468 (51.38%)
- David G. Martin - 149,049 (27.60%)
- Ella Butler Scarborough - 55,486 (10.28%)
- Bob Ayers - 22,477 (4.16%)
- Mike Robinson - 20,178 (3.74%)
- James Everette Carmack - 8,200 (1.52%)
- Gene Gay - 7,173 (1.33%)

North Carolina United States Senate election, 1998:

- John Edwards (D) - 1,029,237 (51.15%)
- Lauch Faircloth (R) (inc.) - 945,943 (47.01%)
- Barbara Howe (LBT) - 36,963 (1.84%)

Minnesota Independence Party presidential caucus, 2004:

- John Edwards - 335 (41.10%)
- John Kerry - 149 (18.28%)
- George W. Bush (inc.) - 94 (11.53%)
- Ralph Nader - 78 (9.57%)
- None of the above - 66 (8.10%)
- Dennis Kucinich - 40 (4.91%)
- Lorna Salzman - 9 (1.10%)
- John McCain - 9 (1.10%)
- Al Sharpton - 5 (0.61%)
- David Cobb - 4 (0.49%)
- Wesley Clark - 4 (0.49%)
- Joe Lieberman - 4 (0.49%)
- Howard Dean - 3 (0.37%)
- Jesse Ventura - 3 (0.37%)
- Gary P. Nolan - 2 (0.25%)
- Timothy J. Penny - 2 (0.25%)
- Kent P. Mesplay - 1 (0.12%)
- John B. Anderson - 1 (0.12%)
- Charles W. Barkley - 1 (0.12%)
- Dean M. Barkley - 1 (0.12%)
- Bill Bradley - 1 (0.12%)
- Rudy Giuliani - 1 (0.12%)
- Mickey Mouse - 1 (0.12%)
- Theodore Roosevelt - 1 (0.12%)

Blue states denoted Kerry win, yellow an Edwards win, green a Dean win and orange for Clark

2004 Democratic presidential primaries:

- John Kerry - 9,930,497 (60.98%)
- John Edwards - 3,162,337 (19.42%)
- Howard Dean - 903,460 (5.55%)
- Dennis Kucinich - 620,242 (3.81%)
- Wesley Clark - 547,369 (3.36%)
- Al Sharpton - 380,865 (2.34%)
- Joe Lieberman - 280,940 (1.73%)
- Uncommitted - 157,953 (0.97%)
- Lyndon LaRouche - 103,731 (0.64%)
- Carol Moseley Braun - 98,469 (0.61%)
- Dick Gephardt - 63,902 (0.39%)
- Scattering - 12,525 (0.08%)

2004 Democratic National Convention (Vice Presidential tally):

- John Edwards - chosen by acclamation

2004 United States presidential election:

- George W. Bush/Dick Cheney (R) (inc.) - 62,040,610 (50.73%) and 286 electoral votes (31 states carried)
- John Kerry/John Edwards (D) - 59,028,444 (48.27%) and 251 electoral votes (19 states and D.C. carried)
- John Edwards (D) - 1 electoral vote (Minnesota faithless elector)
- Ralph Nader/Peter Camejo (I) - 465,650 (0.38%)
- Michael Badnarik/Richard Campagna (Libertarian) - 397,265 (0.32%)
- Michael Peroutka/Chuck Baldwin (Constitution) - 143,630 (0.12%)
- David Cobb/Pat LaMarche (Green) - 119,859 (0.096%)

2008 New Hampshire Democratic Vice Presidential primary:

(* - write-in candidate)

- Raymond Stebbins - 50,485 (46.93%)
- William Bryk - 22,965 (21.35%)
- John Edwards* - 10,553 (9.81%)
- Barack Obama* 6,402 (5.95%)
- Bill Richardson* (write-in) - 5,525 (5.14%)
- Hillary Clinton* (write-in) - 3,419 (3.18%)
- Joe Biden* - 1,512 (1.41%)
- Al Gore* - 966 (0.90%)
- Dennis Kucinich* - 762 (0.71%)
- Bill Clinton* - 388 (0.36%)
- John McCain* - 293 (0.27%)
- Christopher Dodd* - 224 (0.21%)
- Ron Paul* - 176 (0.16%)
- Jack Barnes, Jr.* - 95 (0.09%)
- Mike Gravel* - 91 (0.09%)
- Joe Lieberman* - 67 (0.06%)
- Mitt Romney* - 66 (0.06%)
- Mike Huckabee* - 63 (0.06%)
- Rudy Giuliani* - 46 (0.04%)
- Darrel Hunter* - 20 (0.02%)

2008 Democratic presidential primaries and caucuses:

Results as of May 2008; information would change until end of the primaries season
Results presented excluded penalized contests
(* - dropped out from race)

- Barack Obama - 16,706,857
- Hillary Clinton - 16,239,821
- John Edwards* - 742,010
- Bill Richardson* - 89,054
- Uncommitted - 82,660
- Dennis Kucinich* - 68,482
- Joe Biden* - 64,041
- Mike Gravel* - 27,662
- Christopher Dodd* - 25,300
- Others - 22,556

== See also ==
- Electoral history of Barack Obama
- Electoral history of Dick Cheney
- Electoral history of George W. Bush
- Electoral history of Hillary Clinton
- Electoral history of Joe Biden
- Electoral history of Joe Lieberman
- Electoral history of John Kerry
- Electoral history of Kamala Harris
