= Lois Pines =

American politician

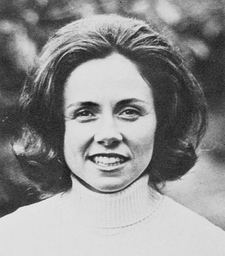
- Pines c. 1975

Member of the Massachusetts Senate from the 1st Middlesex and Norfolk district
- In office 1987–1999
- Preceded by: Jack Backman
- Succeeded by: Cynthia Stone Creem

Personal details
- Born: August 16, 1940 (age 86) Malden, Massachusetts
- Party: Democratic
- Education: Barnard College; University of Cincinnati School of Law
- Occupation: Attorney; Politician

Lois Pines is an American politician who served in the Massachusetts General Court and was a candidate for statewide office four times.

== Early life ==
Pines was born on August 16, 1940, in Malden, Massachusetts. She graduated from Barnard College in 1960 and then attended Boston University School of Law, but did not graduate. In 1963 she graduated from the University of Cincinnati School of Law.

== Political career ==
From 1972 to 1973, Pines was an at-large member of the Newton, Massachusetts Board of Aldermen. From 1973 to 1979 she was a member of the Massachusetts House of Representatives. In 1978, she was a candidate for Massachusetts Secretary of the Commonwealth. She finished second in the seven candidate Democratic primary behind incumbent Michael J. Connolly with 24.85% of the vote.

After her defeat, Pines was appointed Regional Director of the New England Office of the Federal Trade Commission. In 1981, she resigned to run for Lieutenant Governor of Massachusetts. She finished in fifth place behind John Kerry, Evelyn Murphy, Samuel Rotondi, and Lou Nickinello.

From 1987 to 1999, Pines represented the 1st Middlesex and Norfolk District in the Massachusetts Senate. In 1998 she was a candidate for Massachusetts Attorney General, losing to Middlesex County District Attorney Thomas Reilly 52.67% to 47.27%.

In 2002 she once again ran for Lieutenant Governor. She finished in second place in the Democratic primary (behind Chris Gabrieli and ahead of John P. Slattery).

Lois Pines is currently a director of the Federal Home Loan Bank in Boston.

== Family ==
Pines is married to Dr. Joseph Pines, a pulmonologist who is an assistant clinical professor of medicine at Harvard Medical School and a senior physician at Beth Israel Deaconess Medical Center, both in Boston. They reside in Newton. She is Jewish.

== See also ==
- Massachusetts House of Representatives' 19th Middlesex district
- Massachusetts Senate's 2nd Middlesex and Norfolk district
- 1973–1974 Massachusetts legislature
- 1975–1976 Massachusetts legislature
