= 1994 United States Senate election in Massachusetts =

- November 8, 1994
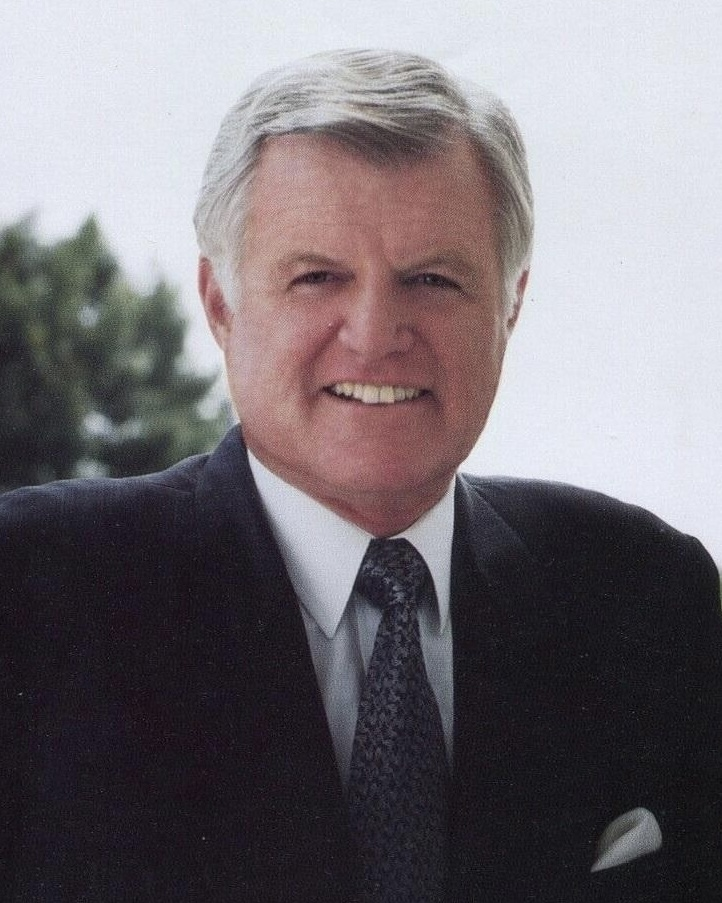

Nominee	Ted Kennedy	Mitt Romney
Party	Democratic	Republican
Popular vote	1,266,011	894,005
Percentage	58.07%	41.01%
- Kennedy: 40–50% 50–60% 60–70% 70–80% 80–90% Romney: 40–50% 50–60% 60–70%
U.S. senator before election
Ted Kennedy
Democratic
Elected U.S. Senator
Ted Kennedy
Democratic

The 1994 United States Senate election in Massachusetts was held November 8, 1994. Incumbent Democratic U.S. Senator Ted Kennedy won re-election to his seventh (his sixth full) term, defeating the Republican nominee, businessman Mitt Romney.

Romney defeated his closest competitor, John Lakian, to win the Republican primary, with over 80% of the vote. He campaigned as a political moderate and Washington outsider, and posed the greatest challenge ever made against Kennedy for the Senate seat, since he first took office in 1962. Democratic congressmen across the country were struggling to maintain their seats, and Kennedy in particular was damaged by character concerns and an ongoing divorce controversy. The contest became very close.

Kennedy launched ads criticizing Romney's tenure as the leader of the company known as Bain Capital, accusing him of treating workers unfairly and taking away jobs, while also criticizing what were widely considered to be Romney's shifting political views. Romney also performed inadequately in the debates between the two candidates, and made a number of poorly received statements that reduced his standing in the polls.

In the closest Senate election of his career since after 1962, Kennedy won by a reasonably comfortable margin, despite a series of losses for Democrats around the country, including control of the US Senate. Despite Romney's loss in this race, he was later elected Governor of Massachusetts in 2002, as well as U.S. Senator from Utah in 2018. He was also the Republican nominee for President of the United States in 2012, in which he lost the presidency to President Barack Obama.

== Republican primary ==
=== Candidates ===
- John Lakian, businessman and candidate for governor in 1982
- Mitt Romney, CEO of Bain Capital and son of former Michigan governor George W. Romney

=== Campaign ===
Romney was initially behind businessman John Lakian in the battle to win the Massachusetts Republican Party's nomination for the U.S. Senate. However, after using his personal wealth to advertise heavily on television, he gained overwhelming support at the state party convention.

Romney then defeated Lakian easily in the September 1994 Republican Party primary, with over 80 percent of the vote.

=== Results ===
Massachusetts United States Senate Republican primary, 1994
Party	Candidate	Votes	%
Republican	Mitt Romney	188,280	82.04
Republican	John Lakian	40,898	17.82
	Others	318	0.14
Total votes		229,496	100

== General election ==
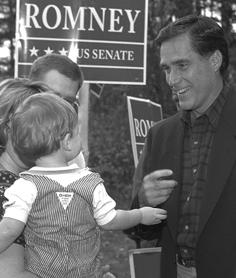
Romney campaigning in Holyoke, Massachusetts

=== Candidates ===
- William A. Ferguson (LaRouche Was Right)
- Mary Fridley (Libertarian)
- Ted Kennedy, incumbent U.S. Senator since 1962 (Democratic)
- Mitt Romney, CEO of Bain Capital and son of former Michigan governor George W. Romney (Republican)

=== Campaign ===
In the general election, Kennedy faced the first serious re-election challenger of his career in the younger, telegenic, and very well-funded Romney. Romney ran as a successful entrepreneur and Washington outsider, with a strong family image and moderate stands on social issues. After two decades out of public view, his father George re-emerged during the campaign. George Romney had urged Mitt to enter the race, and moved into his son's house for its duration, serving as an unofficial advisor.

Kennedy was more vulnerable than usual in 1994 – in part because of the unpopularity of the Democratic Congress as a whole, and also because this was Kennedy's first election since the William Kennedy Smith trial in Florida, in which Kennedy had taken some public relations hits regarding his character. Kennedy was saddled not only with his recent past, but the 25th anniversary of the Chappaquiddick incident and his first wife Joan Bennett Kennedy seeking a re-negotiated divorce settlement.

Some early polls showed Romney close to Kennedy. By mid-September 1994, polls showed the race to be even. One Boston Herald/WCVB-TV poll taken after the September 20, 1994, primary showed Romney ahead, 44 percent to 42 percent, within the poll's sampling margin of error. In another September poll, Romney had a 43 to 42 percent lead. President Bill Clinton traveled to Massachusetts to campaign for Kennedy.

Religion became an issue for a while, after Kennedy's campaign said it was fair to ask Romney about his LDS Church's past policy of not allowing blacks into the priesthood. Romney accused Kennedy of having violated Senator John F. Kennedy's famous September 1960 pledge not to allow his own Catholic doctrine to inform policy, made during his ultimately victorious presidential campaign. George Romney forcefully interjected during his son's press conference, "I think it is absolutely wrong to keep hammering on the religious issues. And what Ted is trying to do is bring it into the picture."

After Romney touted his business credentials, and his record at creating jobs within his company, Kennedy ran campaign ads showing an Indiana company, Ampad, bought out by Romney's firm, Bain Capital. They showed interviews with its union workers who had been fired, and who criticized Romney for the loss of their jobs, with one saying, "I don't think Romney is creating jobs because he took every one of them away." Romney claimed that 10,000 jobs were created because of his work at Bain, but private detectives hired by Kennedy found a factory bought by Bain Capital that had suffered a 350-worker strike, after Bain had cut worker pay and benefits. Kennedy's charges were effective, as more voters decided that Romney was interested in profits more than people.

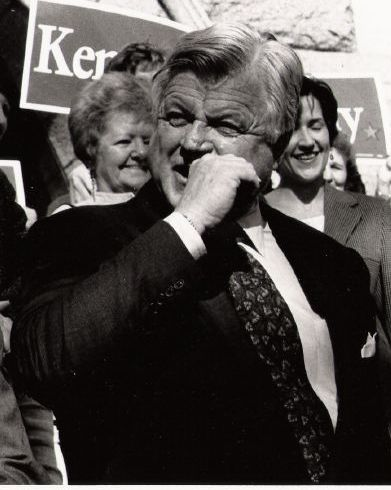
Kennedy campaigning in Lowell

Kennedy's attack ads also focused both on Romney's shifting political views; although both Kennedy and Romney supported the abortion rights established under Roe v. Wade, Kennedy accused Romney of being "multiple choice" on the issue, rather than "pro choice". Romney said his stance dated back to his mother, Lenore Romney, and her position during her 1970 U.S. Senate campaign: "My mother and my family have been committed to the belief that we can believe as we want, but we will not force our beliefs on others on that matter. And you will not see me wavering on that." Nevertheless, women's groups and Democrats viewed Romney's position with suspicion. (In subsequent years, Romney became anti-abortion and opposed Roe.)

Kennedy's campaign ran short on money, and belying his image as endlessly wealthy, he was forced to take out a second mortgage on his Virginia home. Romney spent over $7 million of his own money, with Kennedy spending more than $10 million from his campaign fund, mostly in the last weeks of the campaign (this was the second-most expensive race of the 1994 election cycle, after the Dianne Feinstein–Michael Huffington Senate race in California). Kennedy's new wife, Vicki Reggie Kennedy, proved to be a strong asset in campaigning.

By early October, Kennedy was ahead by 49 to 44 percent in a Boston Globe poll. In their first televised debate, held at Faneuil Hall on October 25, Kennedy came out charging with his aging, but still booming, voice; regarding the Ampad deal, he said to Romney: "I don't know why you wouldn't meet with the strikers with that flimflam deal of yours out there in Indiana." Romney charged that Kennedy had benefited from a real-estate deal that had been done on a no-bid basis, but Kennedy responded with a rehearsed line: "Mr. Romney, the Kennedys are not in public service to make money. We have paid too high a price in our commitment to the public service of this country." Each candidate was asked to discuss one of their own failings. In a dramatic moment, Kennedy indirectly referred to his personal problems, and acknowledged that he was "painfully aware" that on such occasions, he had let his supporters down. By contrast, Romney mentioned work for several local charities he was engaged with on a near daily basis. When the moderator reminded him of the question, Romney responded: "I guess what I regret is that I'm not able to provide even more help for those less fortunate than myself... I wish I could do even more." Kennedy won this key debate, as he re-connected with his traditional bases of support: Two polls of voters conducted afterwards both showed Kennedy as the victor in the debate. One post-debate October general election poll showed Kennedy leading 50 percent to 32, and another by 56 to 36 percent. A second debate, held two days later at Holyoke Community College, focused more on policy details, and lacked the intensity of the first one; Romney failed to gain any traction from it.

=== Polling ===
Pollster	Date	M.o.E.	Kennedy	Romney	Unsure
Boston Globe/WBZ-TV	July 24, 1994		50%	34%	16%
Boston Globe/WBZ-TV	September 25, 1994	±5.0%	48%	46%	6%
Opinion Dynamics of Cambridge	October 27, 1994	±5.0%	52%	33%	15%

=== Results ===
In the November general election, despite a bad national year for Democrats overall, Kennedy easily won re-election, by a 58% to 41% margin, the closest re-election race of his career and the only such contest where Kennedy failed to capture at least 60% of the vote; only his initial victory in the 1962 special election was closer.

1994 United States Senate election in Massachusetts
Party	Candidate	Votes	%	±%
Democratic	Ted Kennedy (incumbent)	1,266,011	58.07	–6.90
Republican	Mitt Romney	894,005	41.01	+7.08
Libertarian	Lauraleigh Dozier	14,484	0.66	+0.15
LaRouche Was Right	William A. Ferguson, Jr.	4,776	0.22	+0.22
Write-in		688	0.03	+.02
Total votes		2,179,964	71.54	
Democratic hold				

== See also ==
- 1994 United States Senate elections
