= Mackerel by Moonlight =

American novel by William Weld

Mackerel by Moonlight cover

Mackerel by Moonlight is a 1998 political suspense novel by former Massachusetts Governor William Weld. Mackerel was "a much-discussed bestseller."
