= Leon Lombardi =

American politician

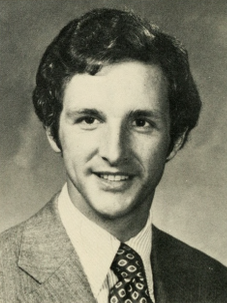
- Lombardi c. 1979

Member of the Massachusetts House of Representatives from the 1st Bristol district
- In office 1977–1983
- Preceded by: John S. Ames III
- Succeeded by: William B. Vernon

Chairman of the Massachusetts Republican Party
- In office 1991–1992
- Preceded by: Ray Shamie
- Succeeded by: Jim Rappaport

Personal details
- Born: April 14, 1949 (age 77) Brockton, Massachusetts, U.S.
- Party: Republican
- Education: Suffield Academy
- Alma mater: Tufts University (BA); Boston University (JD)
- Occupation: Attorney

Leon J. Lombardi (born April 16, 1949 in Brockton, Massachusetts) is an American attorney and politician who served as a member of the Massachusetts House of Representatives from 1977–1983 and as the Chairman of the Massachusetts Republican Party from 1990-1992. He was the Republican nominee for Lieutenant Governor of Massachusetts in 1982. He was appointed an associate justice of the Massachusetts Land Court Department by Gov. William Weld in 1995 and retired in 2008.

Party political offices
Preceded by William I. Cowin	Republican nominee for Lieutenant Governor of Massachusetts; 1982	Succeeded by Nicholas Nikitas
