= Decker College =

Decker College was a proprietary (investor-owned and for-profit) comprehensive business school. It had 5,700 students, 500 faculty and staff and multiple campuses in Louisville, Louisville, Kentucky, Atlanta, Georgia, Indianapolis, Indiana, and Jacksonville, Florida. The school was closed in September 2005, and filed for bankruptcy following a disagreement with the United States Department of Education about accreditation of its construction-related courses and online instruction. According to former U.S. Senator Alfonse D'Amato during the 2006 Republican primary for Governor of New York, William Weld, former Governor of Massachusetts and chief executive of the college from January to October 2005, was responsible and oversaw "multimillion dollar looting".

On June 10, 2009, the Associated Press reported that the case against Decker College had been dropped, and no charges had been filed. Robert Keats, bankruptcy trustee for Decker College, disclosed the status of the investigation to a federal bankruptcy judge in a filing made public June 9. "There are no indictments, no further investigation," he stated. According to the AP, U.S. Attorney spokeswoman Dawn Masden confirmed that the investigation was closed with no indictments.

On August 12, 2016, the Decker College bankruptcy case was re-examined, with a Kentucky federal high court ruling and overturning false allegations made in 2012 by Education Department employee Ralph LoBosco. The verdict showed the potential for falsification of all evidence against Decker College, which erroneously led to the Department of Education's termination of the school's accreditation and federal funding. The late verdict allowed Decker College to regain its new life."
