= Jack Backman =

American politician

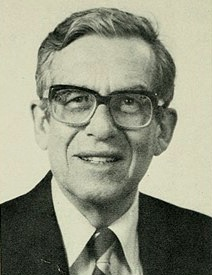
- Jack Backman, circa 1983

Member of the Massachusetts Senate from the Second Middlesex and Norfolk district
- In office 1971–1987
- Preceded by: Beryl Cohen
- Succeeded by: Lois Pines

Personal details
- Born: April 26, 1922 Saugus, Massachusetts
- Died: July 19, 2002 (aged 80) Boston, Massachusetts
- Party: Democratic
- Education: Syracuse University; Harvard University
- Occupation: Attorney; Politician

Jack H. Backman (April 26, 1922 – July 19, 2002) was an American politician who served in the Massachusetts House of Representatives and the Massachusetts Senate.

== Early life ==
Backman was born on April 26, 1922, in Saugus, Massachusetts. He was Jewish. His father was a shoe factory foreman and Backman grew up in various New England manufacturing towns, including Lynn, Massachusetts, Bangor, Maine, and Claremont, New Hampshire. In 1943 he graduated from Syracuse University. During World War II he was a sergeant in the Army Air Force. In 1948 he graduated from Harvard Law School.

From 1961 to 1966 he was a member of the Brookline, Massachusetts Housing Authority.

== Massachusetts General Court ==
Backman was a member of the Massachusetts House of Representatives from 1965 to 1971 and the Massachusetts Senate from 1971 to 1987. While in the House he served as Vice-Chairman of the Judiciary Committee and later as Chairman of the Special Commission on Drug Abuse. In the Senate he remained Chairman of the Special Commission and was Chairman of the Senate Committee on Social Welfare, which became the Committee on Human Services and Elderly Affairs.

During his tenure in the General Court, Backman was involved in a number of social issues, including health care, mental health, prison reform, divestment of pension funds from South Africa, labor issues, and the plight of refugees. In 1971 he proposed replacing welfare with a guaranteed annual income that would provide a family of four a minimum of $5,500.

== Later life and death ==
After his retirement, Backman continued to crusade for social causes. He founded Human Rights for All, a nonprofit organization that promoted the implementation of the United Nations Universal Declaration of Human Rights.

Backman died on July 19, 2002, at Beth Israel Deaconess Medical Center in Boston. Rep. Barney Frank read the following statement into the Congressional Record following Senator Backman's death, which includes a moving Boston Globe editorial by Renee Loth, chief Globe editorial writer, commemorating Sen. Backman.

== See also ==
- 1965–1966 Massachusetts legislature
- 1967–1968 Massachusetts legislature
- 1969–1970 Massachusetts legislature
- 1971–1972 Massachusetts legislature
- 1973–1974 Massachusetts legislature
- 1975–1976 Massachusetts legislature
- 1977–1978 Massachusetts legislature
- 1979–1980 Massachusetts legislature
- 1981–1982 Massachusetts legislature
- 1983–1984 Massachusetts legislature
- 1985–1986 Massachusetts legislature
