= 1996 United States Senate election in Massachusetts =

- November 5, 1996
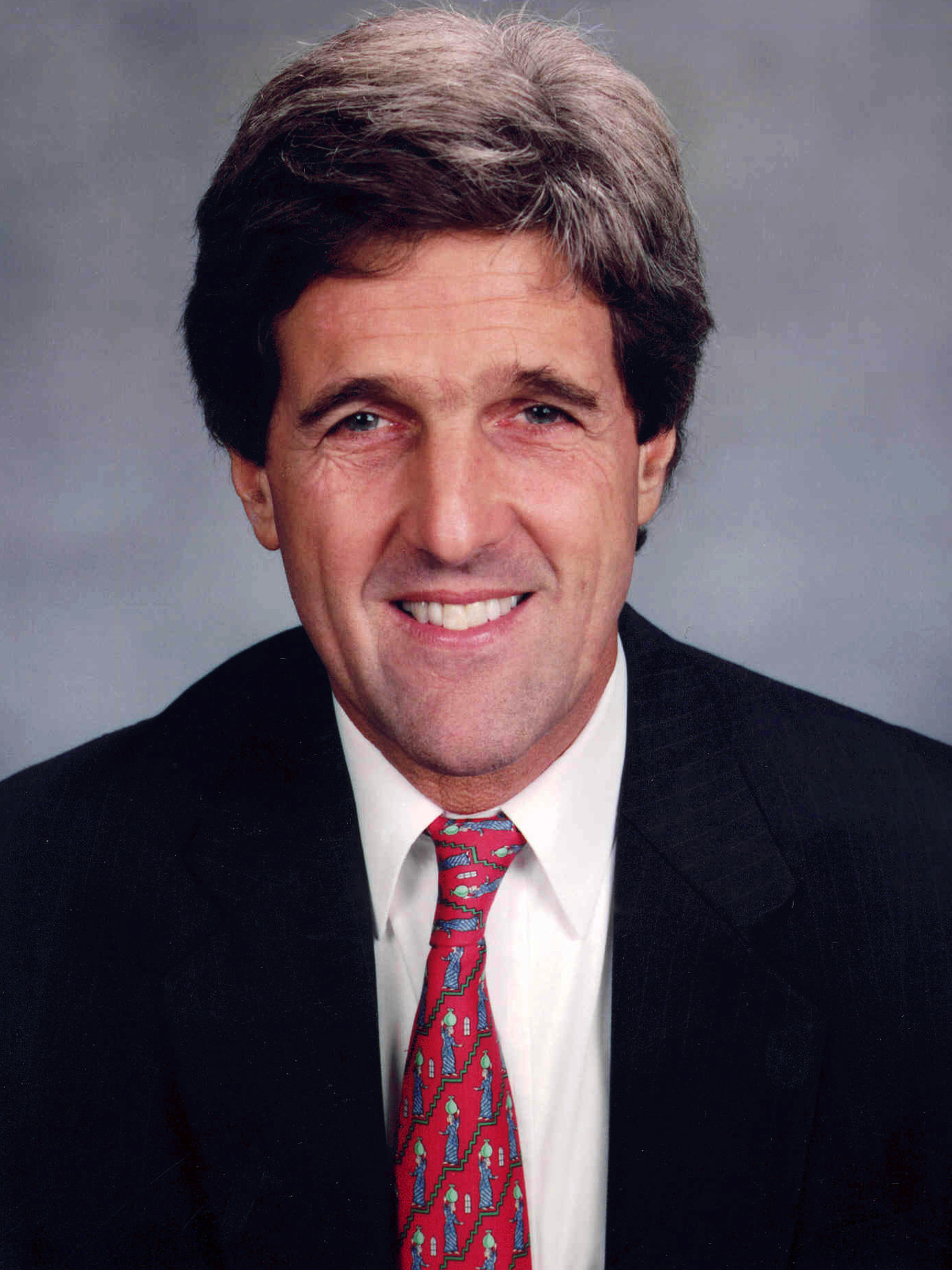

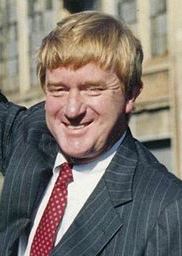
Nominee	John Kerry	Bill Weld
Party	Democratic	Republican
Popular vote	1,334,345	1,142,837
Percentage	52.21%	44.41%
- Kerry: 40–50% 50–60% 60–70% 70–80% Weld: 40–50% 50–60% 60–70%
U.S. senator before election
John Kerry
Democratic
Elected U.S. Senator
John Kerry
Democratic

The 1996 United States Senate election in Massachusetts took place on November 5, 1996. Incumbent Democratic U.S. Senator John Kerry won re-election to a third term over Republican Bill Weld, the governor of Massachusetts.

== General election ==
=== Candidates ===
- Susan C. Gallagher (Conservative)
- John Kerry, incumbent U.S. senator since 1985 (Democratic)
- Robert C. Stowe (Natural Law)
- Bill Weld, governor of Massachusetts (Republican)

=== Campaign ===
On November 29, 1995, incumbent Governor Bill Weld announced his candidacy for the Senate seat occupied by U.S. Senator John Kerry with a formal announcement on March 27, 1996. Kerry's previous two general election opponents in 1984 and 1990 had no prior experience in elected office.

At the federal level, Democrats controlled both of the state's U.S. Senate seats and eight of its ten U.S. House seats. No Republican had won a Senate election since Ed Brooke in 1972. In 1994, incumbent Democrat Ted Kennedy won re-election against businessman Mitt Romney with 58% of the vote—a comfortable margin, but his lowest percentage of the vote since his first Senate election campaign in 1962. However, Weld, a fiscal conservative and social liberal, was a very popular governor; he had won reelection in 1994 with over 70% of the vote in spite of the state's Democratic lean. Therefore, the general election was expected to be highly competitive. This was one of many competitive U.S. Senate elections in 1996.

The first debate between Weld and Kerry was held in Faneuil Hall on April 8, with a second debate held on June 3. A third debate was held at the Emerson Majestic Theater on July 2. The Weld and Kerry campaigns agreed to eight debates and a spending cap of $6.9 million negotiated at Senator Kerry's Beacon Hill home on August 7; Senator Kerry later mortgaged his house to raise funds in October. On the same day the spending cap was agreed upon, Governor Weld jumped into the Charles River. He later spoke at the 1996 Republican National Convention on August 14 before debating Senator Kerry again on August 19. Senator Kerry spoke at the 1996 Democratic National Convention and debated Governor Weld again on September 16.

=== Debates ===
1996 United States Senate election in Massachusetts debates
No.	Date	Host	Moderator	Link	Democratic	Republican
Key: P Participant A Absent N Not invited I Invited W Withdrawn						
Key: P Participant A Absent N Not invited I Invited W Withdrawn					John Kerry	Bill Weld
1	Apr. 8, 1996	The Boston Globe; WBZ-TV		C-SPAN	P	P
2	Jun. 3, 1996	WHDH-TV	John Marler	C-SPAN	P	P
3	Jul. 2, 1996	Emerson College; WBZ-TV	Liz Walker	C-SPAN	P	P
4	Aug. 19, 1996	The Boston Globe; Boston Herald; WCVB-TV		C-SPAN	P	P
5	Sep. 16, 1996	The Boston Globe; Boston Herald; WCVB-TV	Charles Ogletree	C-SPAN	P	P
6	Oct. 15, 1996	WHDH-TV	Christopher Lydon	C-SPAN	P	P
7	Oct. 23, 1996	WGBY-TV	Jim Madigan	C-SPAN	P	P
8	Oct. 28, 1996	WCVB-TV	Ken Bode	C-SPAN	P	P

== Results ==
1996 U.S. Senate election in Massachusetts
Party	Candidate	Votes	%	±%
Democratic	John Kerry (incumbent)	1,334,345	52.21%	▼1.77
Republican	Bill Weld	1,142,837	44.41%	▲4.22
Conservative	Susan C. Gallagher	70,013	2.74%	N/A
Natural Law	Robert C. Stowe	7,176	0.28%	N/A
Write-in		1,515	0.06%	▼0.01
Total votes		2,555,886	100.00%	

== See also ==
- 1996 United States presidential election
- 1996 United States Senate elections
