= 1982 Connecticut Attorney General election =

- November 2, 1982
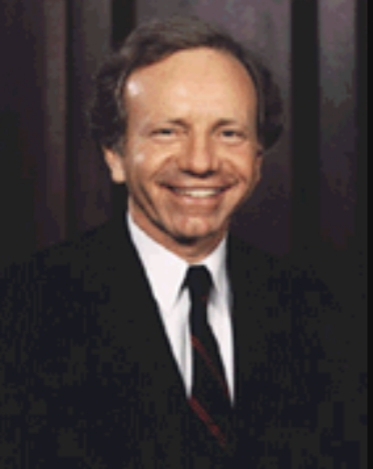

Nominee	Joe Lieberman	William H. Champlin III
Party	Democratic	Republican
Popular vote	601,711	424,961
Percentage	58.1%	41.1%
- Lieberman: 40–50% 50–60% 60–70% 70–80% 80–90% Champlin: 40–50% 50–60% 60–70% 70–80%
Attorney General before election
Carl R. Ajello
Democratic
Elected Attorney General
Joe Lieberman
Democratic

The 1982 Connecticut Attorney General election took place on November 2, 1982, to elect the Attorney General of Connecticut. Two-term incumbent Democratic Attorney General Carl R. Ajello did not seek re-election. Democratic nominee Joe Lieberman defeated Republican nominee William H. Champlin III.

== Democratic primary ==
=== Candidates ===
==== Nominee ====
- Joe Lieberman, former state senator from the 11th district (1971–1973) and 10th district (1973–1981), and nominee for the U.S. House of Representatives from CT-03 in 1980

==== Withdrew after convention ====
- Joseph Ruggiero, former state Senator from the 30th district (1979-1981)

==== Eliminated at convention ====
- Thayer Baldwin, former state health official and New Haven Corporation Counsel (1976-1978)
- Peter Gillies, Deputy Attorney General

== Republican primary ==
=== Candidates ===
==== Nominee ====
- William H. Champlin III, chairman of the Hartford Republican town committee.

== Third-party candidates ==
=== Libertarian Party ===
==== Nominee ====
- Vincent Stuart Triola

== General election ==
=== Results ===
1982 Connecticut Attorney General election
Party	Candidate	Votes	%	±%
Democratic	Joe Lieberman	601,711	58.14%	
Republican	William H. Champlin III	424,961	41.06%	
Libertarian	Vincent Stuart Triola	8,351	0.81%	
Total votes		1,035,023	100.0%	
Democratic hold				

== See also ==
- Connecticut Attorney General
