= Joelle Fishman =

American politician, writer and editor

Joelle R. Fishman (born December 5, 1946) is an American politician, writer and editor.

== Political career ==
Fishman currently chairs the Connecticut Communist Party USA. She also serves as a Commissioner on the City of New Haven Peace Commission. She is a member of the executive board of the Alliance of Retired Americans in Connecticut. From 1973 to 1982, she was the Communist Party candidate for Connecticut's Third Congressional District. She has been a member of the Central Committee of the Communist Party of the United States.

== Personal life ==
She was born in 1946 in Camden, New Jersey. She graduated from Douglass College (the women's college at Rutgers University). She has lived in New Haven since 1968.
