= Bill Weld =

American attorney and politician (born 1945)

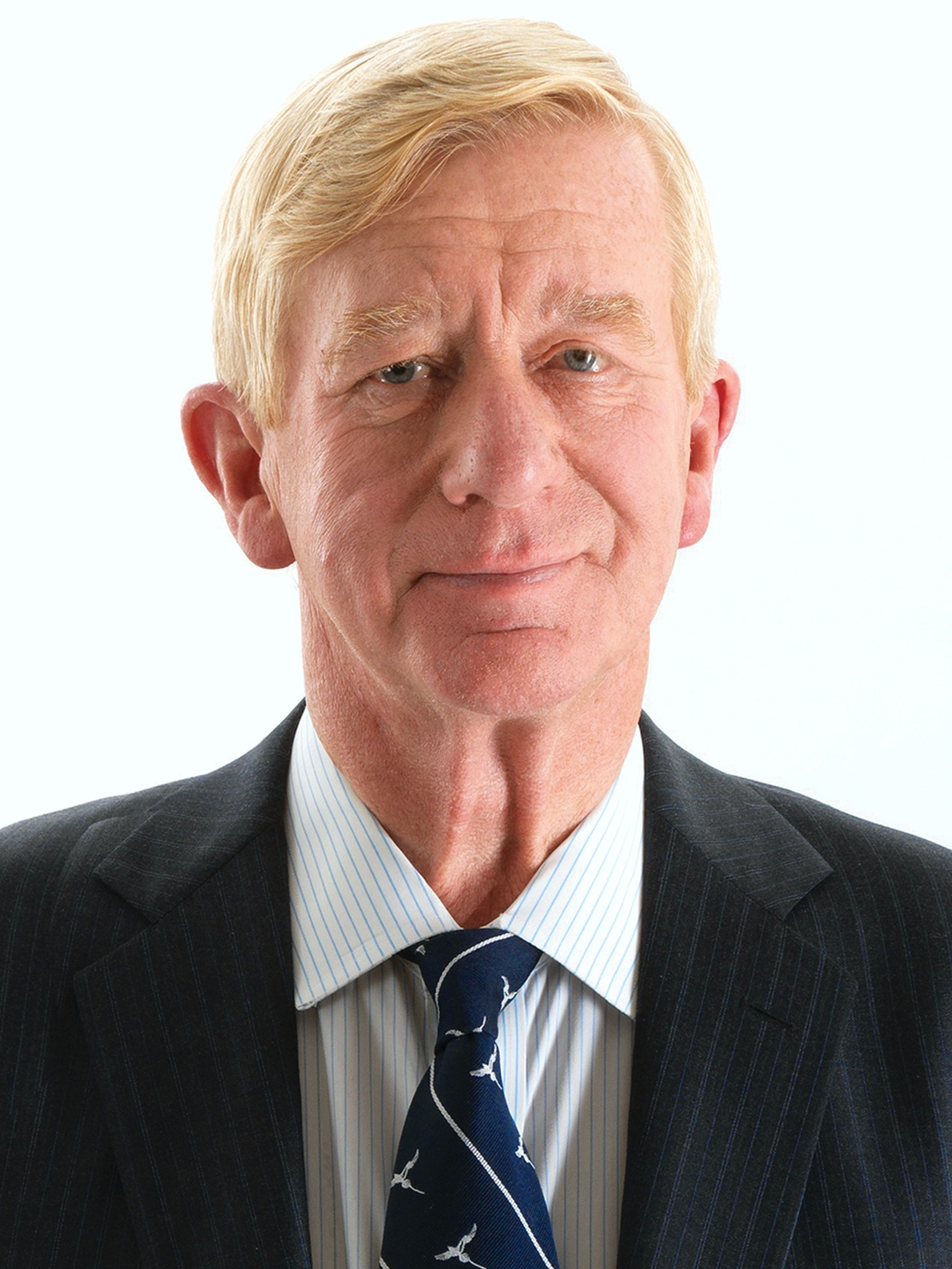
- Weld in 2016

68th Governor of Massachusetts
- In office January 3, 1991 – July 29, 1997
- Lieutenant: Paul Cellucci
- Preceded by: Michael Dukakis
- Succeeded by: Paul Cellucci

United States Assistant Attorney General for the Criminal Division
- In office September 15, 1986 – March 29, 1988
- President: Ronald Reagan
- Preceded by: Stephen S. Trott
- Succeeded by: Edward Dennis

United States Attorney for the District of Massachusetts
- In office November 1, 1981 – September 15, 1986
- President: Ronald Reagan
- Preceded by: Edward F. Harrington
- Succeeded by: Robert Mueller (acting)

Personal details
- Born: William Floyd Weld; July 31, 1945 (age 81) Smithtown, New York, U.S.
- Party: Republican (before 2016, since 2019)
- Other political affiliations: Libertarian (2016–2019)
- Spouses: Susan Roosevelt (m. 1975; div. 2002); Leslie Marshall (m. 2003)
- Children: 5
- Relatives: Weld family
- Education: Harvard University (BA, JD); University College, Oxford (attended)

William Floyd Weld (born July 31, 1945) is an American attorney, businessman, author, and politician who served as the 68th governor of Massachusetts from 1991 to 1997. Weld was Gary Johnson’s running mate in the 2016 presidential election for the Libertarian party. Weld also ran for president in 2020.

A Harvard graduate, Weld began his career as legal counsel to the United States House Committee on the Judiciary before becoming the United States Attorney for the District of Massachusetts and, later, the United States Assistant Attorney General for the Criminal Division. He worked on a series of high-profile public corruption cases and resigned in protest of an ethics scandal and associated investigations into Attorney General Edwin Meese.

Weld was elected governor of Massachusetts in 1990. In the 1994 election, he was reelected by the largest margin of victory in Massachusetts history. In 1996, he was the Republican nominee for the United States Senate in Massachusetts, losing to Democratic incumbent John Kerry. Weld resigned as governor in 1997 to focus on his nomination by President Bill Clinton to serve as United States Ambassador to Mexico; due to opposition by socially conservative Senate Foreign Relations committee Chairman Jesse Helms, he was denied a hearing before the Foreign Relations committee and withdrew his nomination. After moving to New York in 2000, Weld sought the Republican nomination for governor of New York in the 2006 election; when the Republican Party instead endorsed John Faso, Weld withdrew from the race.

Weld became involved in presidential politics in later years. In 2016, he left the Republican Party to become the Libertarian Party running mate of former governor of New Mexico Gary Johnson. They received nearly 4.5 million votes, the most for a Libertarian ticket and the most for any third-party ticket since Ross Perot's Reform Party in 1996.

Returning to the Republican Party, Weld announced in April 2019 that he would challenge President Donald Trump in the 2020 Republican primaries. He won his first and only delegate of the primaries in the Iowa caucus in February, making him the first Republican since Pat Buchanan in 1992 to win a delegate while running against an incumbent president. Weld suspended his campaign on March 18, 2020, shortly after Trump's delegate count made him the presumptive Republican nominee, and placed second in 22 states and second overall with 2.4% of the popular vote, collecting up to 13% in protest votes against Trump in several states. He also placed second in allocated delegates. He endorsed Democrat Joe Biden seven months later.

== Early life and family ==
William Floyd Weld was born in Smithtown, New York, on July 31, 1945. He was primarily raised on a farm in Smithtown, though his family also owned a residence in Manhattan. His father, David (1911–1972), was an investment banker; his mother, Mary Nichols Weld (1913–1986), was a descendant of William Floyd, a signatory of the U.S. Declaration of Independence. His ancestor Edmund Weld was among the earliest students (class of 1650) at Harvard College; eighteen other Welds have attended Harvard, and two Harvard buildings are named for the family. A distant cousin, General Stephen Minot Weld Jr., fought with distinction in the Civil War.

Weld attended Middlesex School in Concord, Massachusetts. He graduated with a Bachelor of Arts, summa cum laude, in classics from Harvard College in 1966. He studied economics at University College, Oxford. After returning to the US, he graduated with a J.D., cum laude, from Harvard Law School in 1970.

His siblings are Francis "Tim" Weld, MD (1939–2005), David Weld, and Anne Weld Collins (1941–2022). His maternal grandfather was the ichthyologist and ornithologist John Treadwell Nichols, and his first cousin is the novelist John Nichols.

== Early career ==
=== Nixon impeachment inquiry ===
Weld began his legal career as a junior counsel on the U.S. House Judiciary Committee's impeachment inquiry staff during the 1974 impeachment process against Richard Nixon. He contributed to the groundbreaking "Constitutional Grounds for Presidential Impeachment" report, which detailed the historical basis and standards for impeachment of a president. He also worked on researching whether impoundment of appropriated funds was an impeachable offense. Among his colleagues was Hillary Clinton.

=== U.S. Attorney for Massachusetts ===
Weld's experience on the impeachment inquiry staff sparked his interest in criminal law. He returned to Massachusetts, where he ran for Massachusetts Attorney General in 1978, losing to Democratic incumbent Francis X. Bellotti, 1,532,835 votes (78.4%) to 421,417 (21.6%).

In 1981, Weld was recommended to President Reagan by Rudy Giuliani, then Associate U.S. Attorney General, for appointment as the U.S. Attorney for Massachusetts. During Weld's tenure, the Attorney General's office prosecuted some of New England's largest banks in cases involving money-laundering and other white-collar crimes. Weld expanded an ongoing public corruption investigation of the administration of Boston Mayor Kevin White. More than 20 city employees were indicted, pleaded guilty, or were convicted of a range of charges, including several of the mayor's supporters. In 1985, The Boston Globe said Weld "has been by far the most visible figure in the prosecution of financial institutions."

Weld gained national recognition in fighting public corruption: he won 109 convictions out of 111 cases.

In 1983, The Boston Globe wrote: "The U.S. Attorney's office has not lost a single political corruption case since Weld took over, an achievement believed to be unparalleled in the various federal jurisdictions."

=== Promotion to Justice Department ===
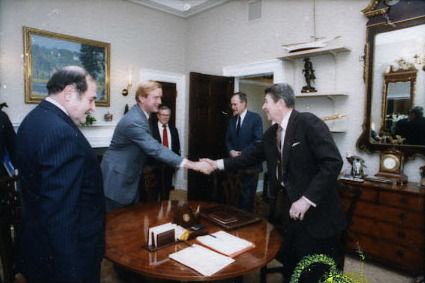
Weld greeting President Ronald Reagan in 1988

In 1986, President Reagan promoted Weld to head of the Criminal Division of the Justice Department in Washington, where Weld oversaw 700 employees. Serving from September 15, 1986, until March 29, 1988, Weld was responsible for supervising all federal prosecutions, including those investigated by the FBI and the Drug Enforcement Administration, as well as the work of the 93 U.S. Attorneys (who by then included Rudy Giuliani in Manhattan). During this time, Weld worked on some of the Reagan administration's most significant prosecutions and investigations, including the capture of Panama's Manuel Noriega on drug trafficking charges. Weld was on the prosecution team against NASA Administrator James Beggs and General Dynamics that caused Beggs to take a leave of absence shortly before the Challenger disaster. After the trial exonerated Beggs, Weld was asked to apologize to him. He refused.

In 1988, while serving as Assistant Attorney General of the Justice Department Criminal Division, Weld wrote the House Judiciary Committee a memorandum formally reviewing the recommendations of the House Select Committee on Assassinations final report and reported conclusions of active investigations on the assassinations of John F. Kennedy and Martin Luther King Jr. In light of investigative reports from the FBI's Technical Services Division and the National Academy of Sciences Committee determining that "reliable acoustic data do not support a conclusion that there was a second gunman" in the Kennedy assassination, and that all investigative leads known to the Justice Department for both assassinations had been "exhaustively pursued", the Department concluded "that no persuasive evidence can be identified to support the theory of a conspiracy in either the assassination of President Kennedy or the assassination of Dr. King."

In March 1988, Weld resigned from the Justice Department, together with Deputy Attorney General Arnold Burns and four aides, in protest of improper conduct by Attorney General Edwin Meese. In July, Weld and Burns jointly testified before Congress in favor of prosecuting Meese for his personal financial conduct, following a report by a special prosecutor investigating Meese. Meese resigned in July, shortly after Weld's and Burns's testimony.

Weld was a senior partner at Hale and Dorr from 1988 until 1990.

== Governor of Massachusetts (1991–1997) ==
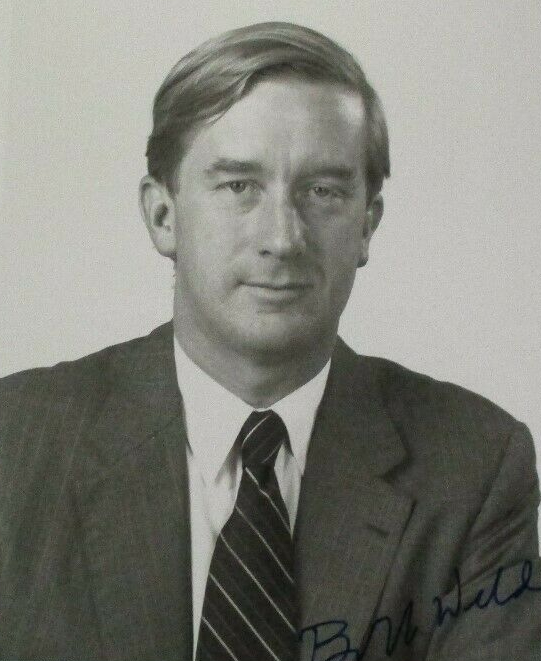
Weld as governor.

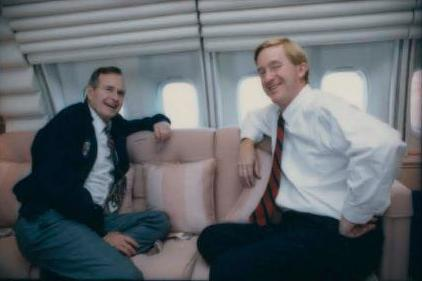
Weld with President George H. W. Bush in 1990

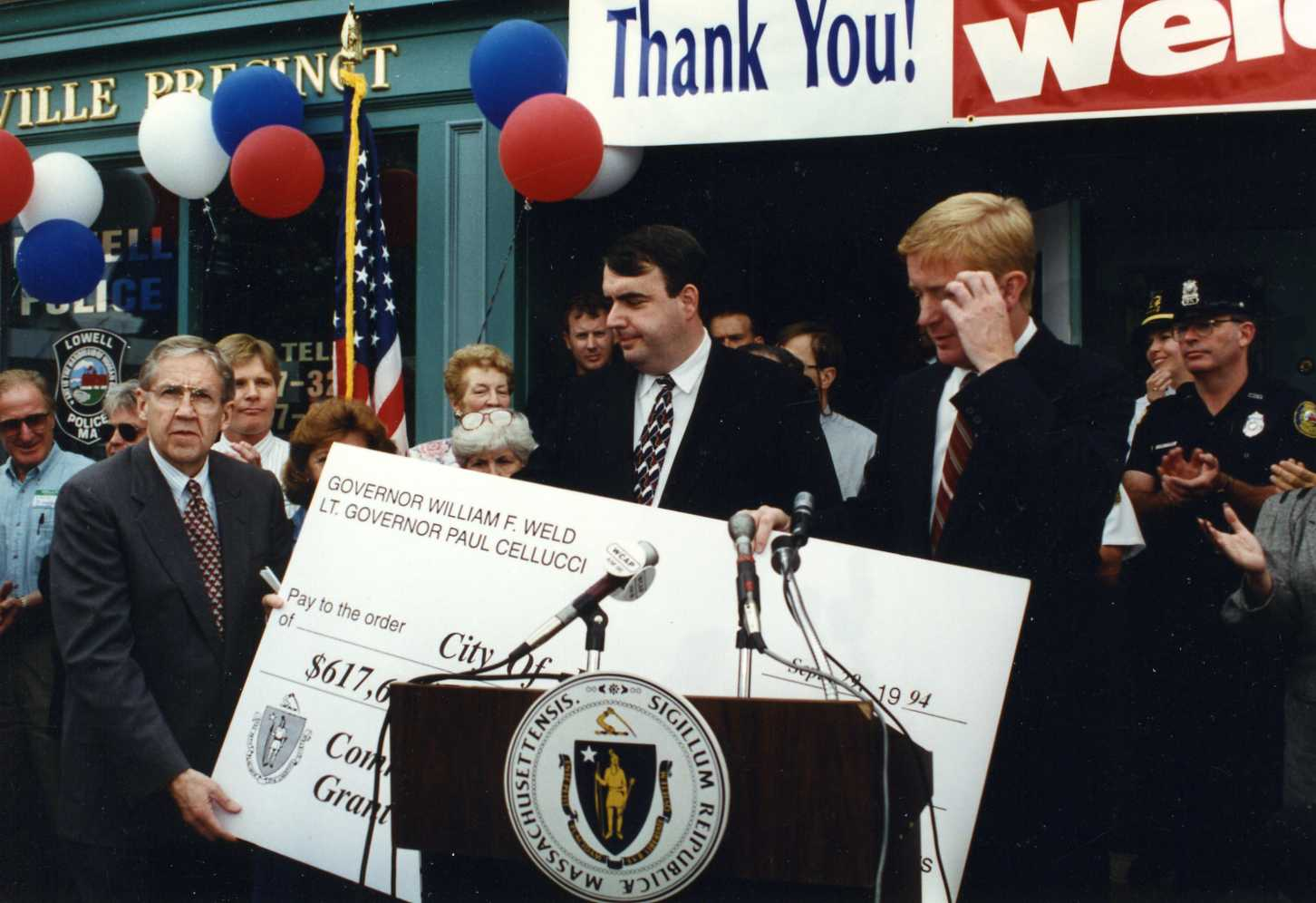
Governor Weld presenting a grant to the City of Lowell in 1994

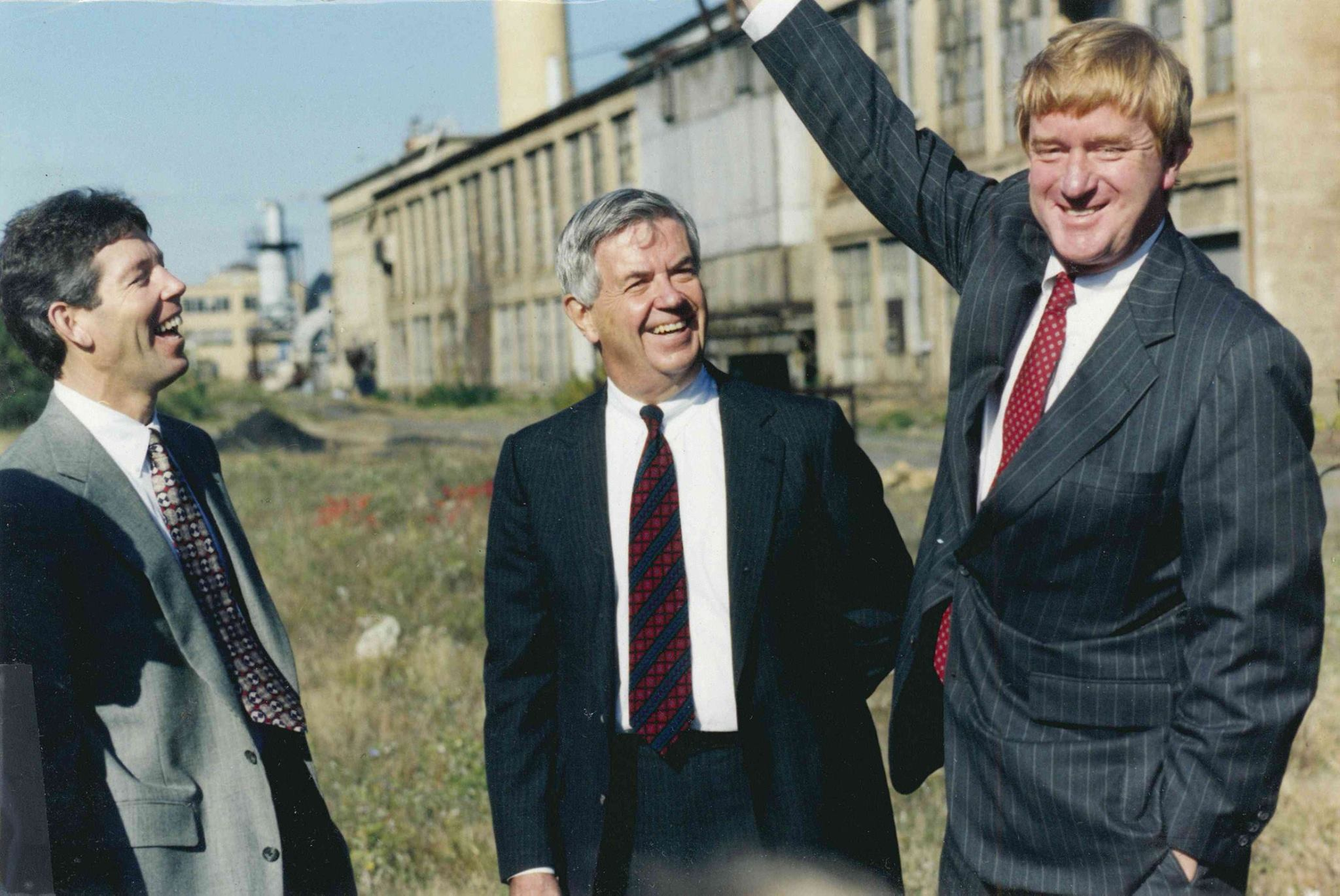
Governor Weld announcing the revival of "The Shoe" at Cummings Center with Cummings Properties president James McKeown and founder Bill Cummings.

In 1990, Weld announced his candidacy for governor of Massachusetts to succeed the outgoing Michael Dukakis. Republicans made up under 14% of the Massachusetts electorate and a Republican had not won the gubernatorial election since 1970, but Weld's liberal stances on social issues made him a viable candidate for office in the state. At the state Republican convention, party officials backed Steven Pierce over Weld, and initial polling had Pierce ahead by 25 percentage points, but Weld gained enough support to force a primary, and won the nomination over Pierce by 94,249 votes.

In the general election, he faced John Silber, the president of Boston University. Polls showed Weld anywhere from a statistical tie to trailing by as many as ten points. Voter dissatisfaction with the state's Democratic majority gave Weld support for his promises to reduce the state deficit, lower the unemployment rate, and cut taxes, while Silber's statements to the right of Weld on social issues caused many Democratic voters to vote for Weld. On November 6, 1990, he was elected as the 68th governor of Massachusetts by 75,939 votes, becoming Massachusetts's first Republican governor since Francis W. Sargent left office in 1975. Weld is generally considered to have been a moderate or liberal Republican governor. He is fiscally conservative and socially liberal.

The business community reacted strongly to Weld's leadership. In a 1994 survey of chief executives by the Massachusetts High Technology Council, 83% of those polled rated the state's business climate as good or excellent, up from 33% at the beginning of his term. Some might claim that Weld's leadership changed the minds of 50% of the CEOs surveyed; others would note the national economic trends or other factors. Weld also reaped the benefits of the 1990s' prosperity, as the state's unemployment rate fell by more than 3 percentage points during his first term, from 9.6% in 1991 to 6.4% in 1994. As a result, Weld received grades of A in 1992, B in 1994, and B in 1996 from the Cato Institute, a libertarian think tank, in its biennial Fiscal Policy Report Card on America's Governors. In 1993 he supported adoption of a gun control bill in Massachusetts that included limits on gun purchases under age 21 and prohibited certain types of weapons, which did not pass. He later renounced that proposal. Weld is pro-choice and helped introduce legislation to make it easier for women to access abortion procedures. As governor, he supported gay rights. In 1992, he signed an executive order to recognize domestic partnership rights for same-sex couples. In 1993, he signed into law legislation protecting the rights of gay students. He also said he would recognize same-sex marriages performed out of state following a court decision in Hawaii. Weld signed into law the Massachusetts Education Reform Act of 1993 that created the Massachusetts Comprehensive Assessment System (MCAS) and the legal framework for charter schools in Massachusetts. He launched a successful effort to privatize many state's human services, laying off thousands of state employees. One of the social services Weld ended was a program providing higher education to prison inmates. He also worked to expand Medicaid access by requesting more federal funding and, then, allowing more residents to qualify for the plan to both solve budget problems and increase access to health care in the state. After cutting state spending year-over-year for his first two years, the Republican Party lost its ability to sustain a veto in the legislature due to losses in the Massachusetts State Senate, forcing Weld to make greater concessions to Democratic legislators.

In 1994, Weld won reelection by 921,740 votes in the most lopsided gubernatorial contest in Massachusetts history. He carried all but five towns in the state, even Boston.

In 1995, Weld eulogized one of his longtime supporters, former Massachusetts House member Mary B. Newman, saying, "Mary Newman, for years the grande dame both of Cambridge and its Republican party, launched me in politics by serving as chair of my statewide campaign in 1978."

Following his landslide victory as governor, Weld briefly considered running for president in 1996. In 1996, after signing a conservation bill, he jumped fully clothed into the Charles River.

=== Cabinet and administration ===
The Weld Cabinet
OFFICE	NAME	TERM
Governor	William Weld	1991–1997
Lt. Governor	Paul Cellucci	1991–1997
Secretary of Transportation and Construction	Richard L. Taylor; James Kerasiotes	1991–1992; 1992–1997
Secretary of Housing & Community Development	Steven Pierce; Mary L. Padula	1991–1991; 1991–1996
Secretary of Environmental Affairs	Susan Tierney; Trudy Coxe	1991–1993; 1993–1997
Secretary of Consumer Affairs	Gloria Cordes Larson; Priscilla Douglas; Nancy Merrick	1991–1993; 1993–1996; 1996–1997
Secretary of Health and Human Services	David P. Forsberg; Charlie Baker; Gerald Whitburn; Joseph V. Gallant; William D. O'Leary	1991–1992; 1992–1994; 1995–1996; 1996–1997; 1997–1997
Secretary of Elder Affairs	Franklin P. Ollivierre	1991–1997
Secretary of Labor	Christine Morris	1991–1996
Secretary of Administration & Finance	Peter Nessen; Mark E. Robinson; Charlie Baker	1991–1993; 1993–1994; 1994–1997
Secretary of Public Safety	James B. Roche; Thomas C. Rapone; Kathleen O'Toole	1991–1992; 1992–1994; 1994–1997
Director of Economic Affairs	Stephen Tocco; Gloria Cordes Larson	1991–1993; 1993–1996
Secretary of Education	Piedad Robertson; Michael Sentance	1991–1995; 1995–1996

=== 1996 Senate election ===
On November 30, 1995, Weld announced that he would challenge incumbent Democratic Senator John Kerry in the 1996 election. Weld, who was among the first reasonably well-funded Republican Senate candidates in Massachusetts since Edward Brooke was unseated in 1978, said of the race, "I've spent some time recently considering where I can do the most good for the people of Massachusetts, and right now the fights that matter most to the people of this state are in another arena, Congress."

The race was covered nationwide as one of the most closely watched Senate races that year. Noted for how civil their respective campaigns were of one another, Kerry and Weld negotiated a campaign spending cap and agreed to eight separate debates leading up to the election. Though facing a traditional uphill battle in a state where Democrats outnumbered Republicans 3-to-1, and running the same year as the presidential election, Weld was a popular incumbent governor and polled even with Kerry throughout the election.

In the end, Kerry won re-election by 191,508 votes, the last seriously contested Senate race in Massachusetts until the special election for Ted Kennedy's seat in 2010. Notably, President Bill Clinton won Massachusetts in 1996 with 61.5% of the vote.

=== Ambassadorship nomination and resignation ===
In July 1997, Weld was nominated to become United States Ambassador to Mexico by President Bill Clinton. His nomination stalled after Senate Foreign Relations committee Chairman Jesse Helms refused to hold a hearing on the nomination, effectively blocking it. Helms was also a Republican and their party held the majority in the chamber, but Helms objected to Weld's moderate stance on social issues such as his support for gay rights, abortion rights and the legalization of medical marijuana. This refusal to hold hearings was also rumored to be at the request of former attorney general and friend of Helms, Edwin Meese. Meese reportedly had a long-standing grudge against Weld stemming from Weld's investigation of Meese during the Iran–Contra affair. Meese denied the speculation, asserting that he wished to keep his distance from Weld. Weld publicly criticized Helms, which the White House discouraged him from doing, but Weld relished the opportunity, saying: "It feels like being in a campaign. I feel newly energized. I love to stir up the pot. I seem to click on more cylinders when the pot is stirred up." Senate Majority Leader Trent Lott said that Weld's chances of being confirmed weren't "very good, and that he hurt himself by attacking the chairman unfairly and with political rhetoric that was just uncalled for." There was speculation that the White House would let his nomination "die", but he refused, saying that he hoped President Clinton "does not plan to give in to ideological extortion" and that "I wanted to send a message that I wanted to be captain of my ship [the nomination] even if it's going to bottom." Some speculated that attacking the more conservative Helms was a way to position him to pick up votes from fellow moderate Republicans in a potential run for president in 2000, but he rejected this, saying that "I've had a lot of people come up to me on the street and say, 'Give 'em hell. That's the Bill Weld we know and love.'"

Weld resigned the governorship on July 29, 1997, to devote his full attention to campaigning for the ambassadorship, even though few thought he would be successful; there was speculation that he was really resigning because he had become tired of serving as governor. A bipartisan majority of Senators signed letters demanding that Helms advance his nomination, but Helms refused. After an intensive six-week battle, Weld conceded defeat and withdrew his nomination on September 15, 1997. He commented, "I asked President Clinton to withdraw my name from the Senate so I can go back to New England, where no one has to approach the government on bended knee to ask it to do its duty."

== Later career ==
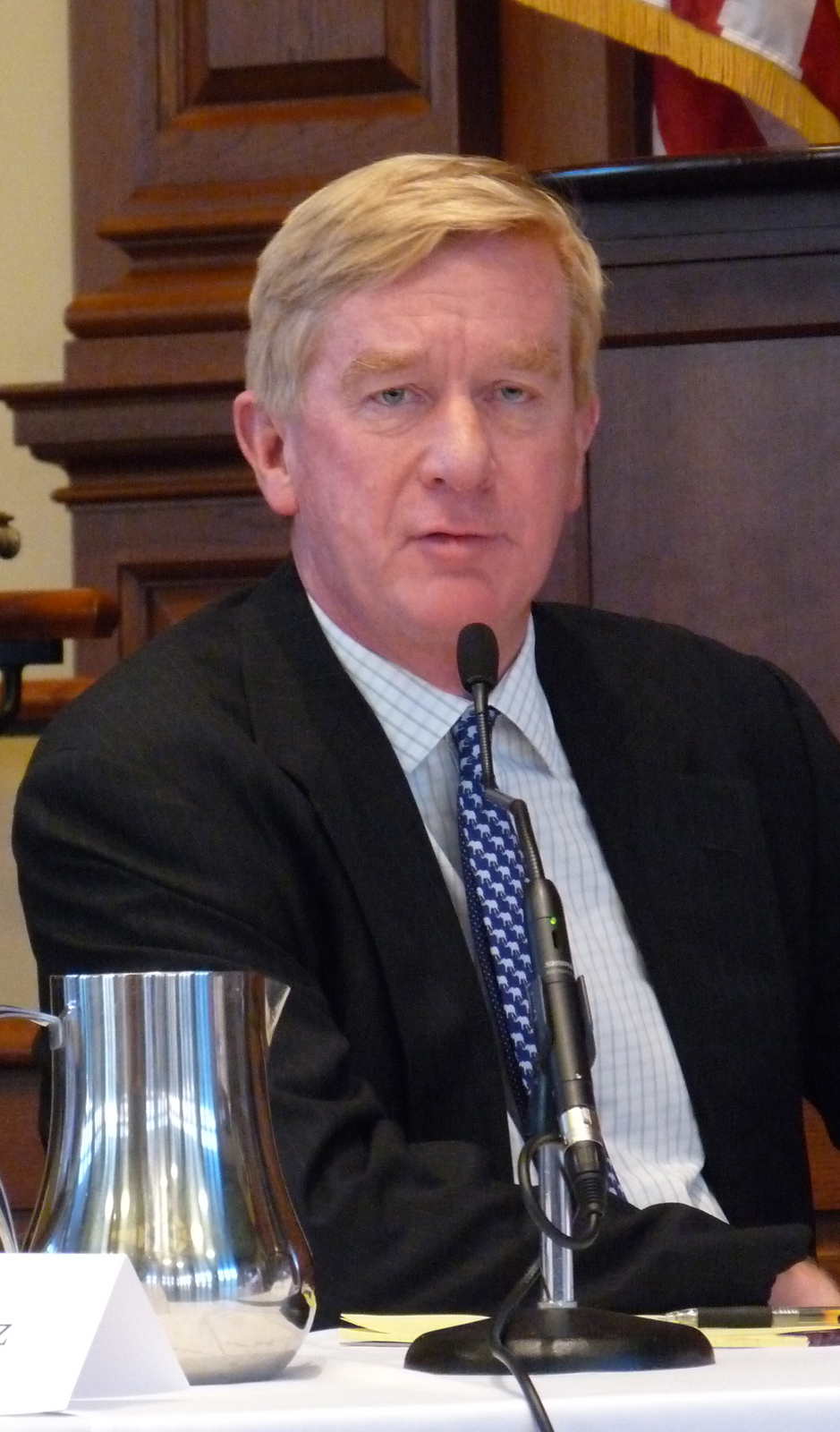
Weld speaking at Harvard Law School in 2008

=== Law firm, lobbyist, private equity partner, and 2004 election ===
Weld was a partner in the Boston and Manhattan offices of the international law firm McDermott Will & Emery from 1997 to 2001, and head of the New York office from 2000 to 2001. Weld was registered as a lobbyist for McDermott Will & Emery. Between 2007 and 2011, Weld was a lobbyist for defense contractor Raytheon, CNX Gas Corporation, Sony Electronics and shoemaker New Balance. In December 2000, the private equity firm Leeds Equity Partners announced that Weld would join the firm, to be renamed Leeds Weld & Co., as a general partner, effective on January 1, 2001. At the private equity firm, Weld later "reduced his role to a senior advisor while considering a run for New York governor" in 2005. Weld rejoined McDermott Will & Emery in 2006. Weld was admitted to the bar in New York in 2008. In 2012, Weld moved to the Boston law firm of Mintz, Levin, Cohn, Ferris, Glovsky, and Popeo, becoming a partner there and a principal with the firm's government relations affiliate, ML Strategies LLC.

During the re-election campaign of President George W. Bush, who was running against Weld's old foe John Kerry, Weld helped Bush to prepare for the debates.

=== Kentucky college management ===
From January to October 2005, Weld was chief executive of Decker College in Louisville, Kentucky. His term ended as the college was closing under bankruptcy protection following a disagreement with the U.S. Department of Education about accreditation of its construction-related courses and online instruction. This matter would follow Weld into the 2006 race for Governor of New York, with former U.S. senator from New York Alfonse D'Amato asserting that Weld was responsible and oversaw "multimillion dollar looting".

On March 27, 2016, The Wall Street Journal reported as part of an opinion article that "Bankruptcy trustee Robert Keats alleged [Ralph] LoBosco", a Department of Education employee, "was trying to exact revenge against Decker CEO William Weld". The article continued: "Education Department administrative law judge Robert Layton recently affirmed a 2012 bankruptcy court finding that the Council on Occupational Education had failed to tell the truth in stating that Decker's online programs were never accredited. The Council's 'factually erroneous' assertion caused the Education Department to withdraw federal student aid in 2005, which precipitated Decker's bankruptcy."

=== Candidacy for Governor of New York, 2005–06 ===
After being Governor of Massachusetts, Weld moved to New York in 2000. On April 24, 2005, it was reported that he was in talks with the New York Republicans to run for Governor of New York in 2006, against likely Democratic nominee Eliot Spitzer. Incumbent GOP Governor George Pataki announced on July 27 that he would not seek a fourth term. On August 19, 2005, Weld officially announced his candidacy for Governor of New York, seeking to become the second person after Sam Houston to serve as governor of two different U.S. states.

In December 2005, Weld received the backing of the Republican county chairs of New York State during a county chairs meeting. On April 29, 2006, Weld received the Libertarian Party's nomination for Governor Of New York. Weld reportedly offered his chief rival for the nomination, former Republican Assembly leader John Faso, the chance to join his ticket as a candidate for lieutenant governor, an offer Faso reportedly declined. Faso gained increasing support from party leaders in various counties, including Westchester and Suffolk, both of which had large delegate counts to the state convention.

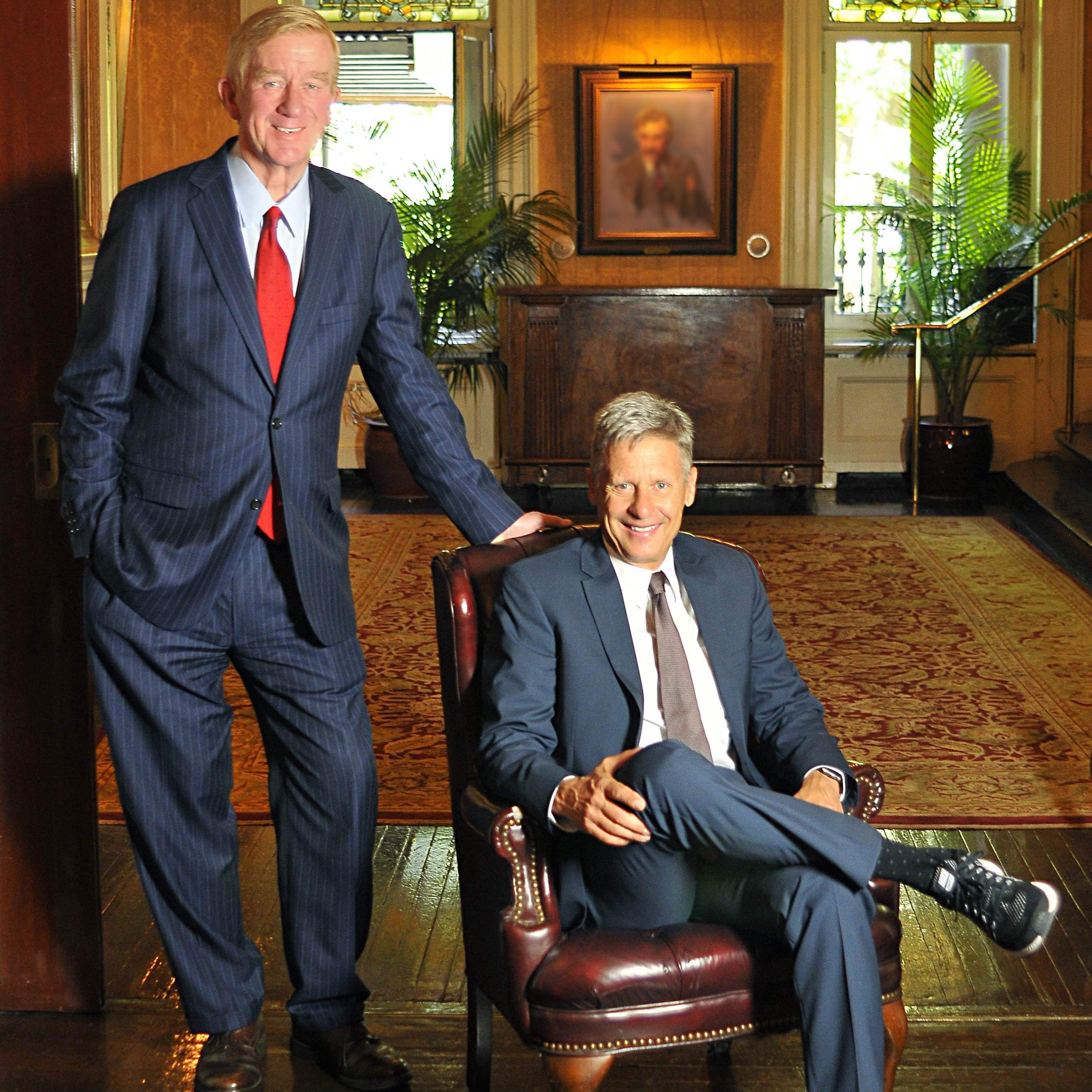
Bill Weld and Gary Johnson in June 2016

On June 1, 2006, the Republican State Convention voted 61% to 39% to endorse Faso over Weld. On June 5, Stephen J. Minarik (the chairman of the state Republican Party, and Weld's most prominent backer), called on Weld to withdraw from the race in the interest of party unity. Weld formally announced his withdrawal from the race the following day and returned to private life. Spitzer would go on to defeat Faso by the largest margin in New York gubernatorial history.

=== Later political involvement ===
Weld publicly endorsed former Massachusetts Governor Mitt Romney for the presidency on January 8, 2007; he was a co-chairman for Romney's campaign in New York State. On the same day that Weld endorsed Romney, Gov. and Mrs. Weld also raised $50,000 for Romney's exploratory committee. Weld personally made a donation of $2,100, the maximum allowed per person per election at the time. After the maximum allowed rose to $2,300, Weld donated another $200.

Weld was also active in campaigning for Romney in New Hampshire, where both governors have been known to travel together. Weld went on to endorse Barack Obama over John McCain in the general election. Weld endorsed Romney in the 2012 presidential election.

In February 2016, Weld endorsed Ohio Governor John Kasich for the Republican presidential nomination.

=== 2016 Libertarian vice presidential nomination ===
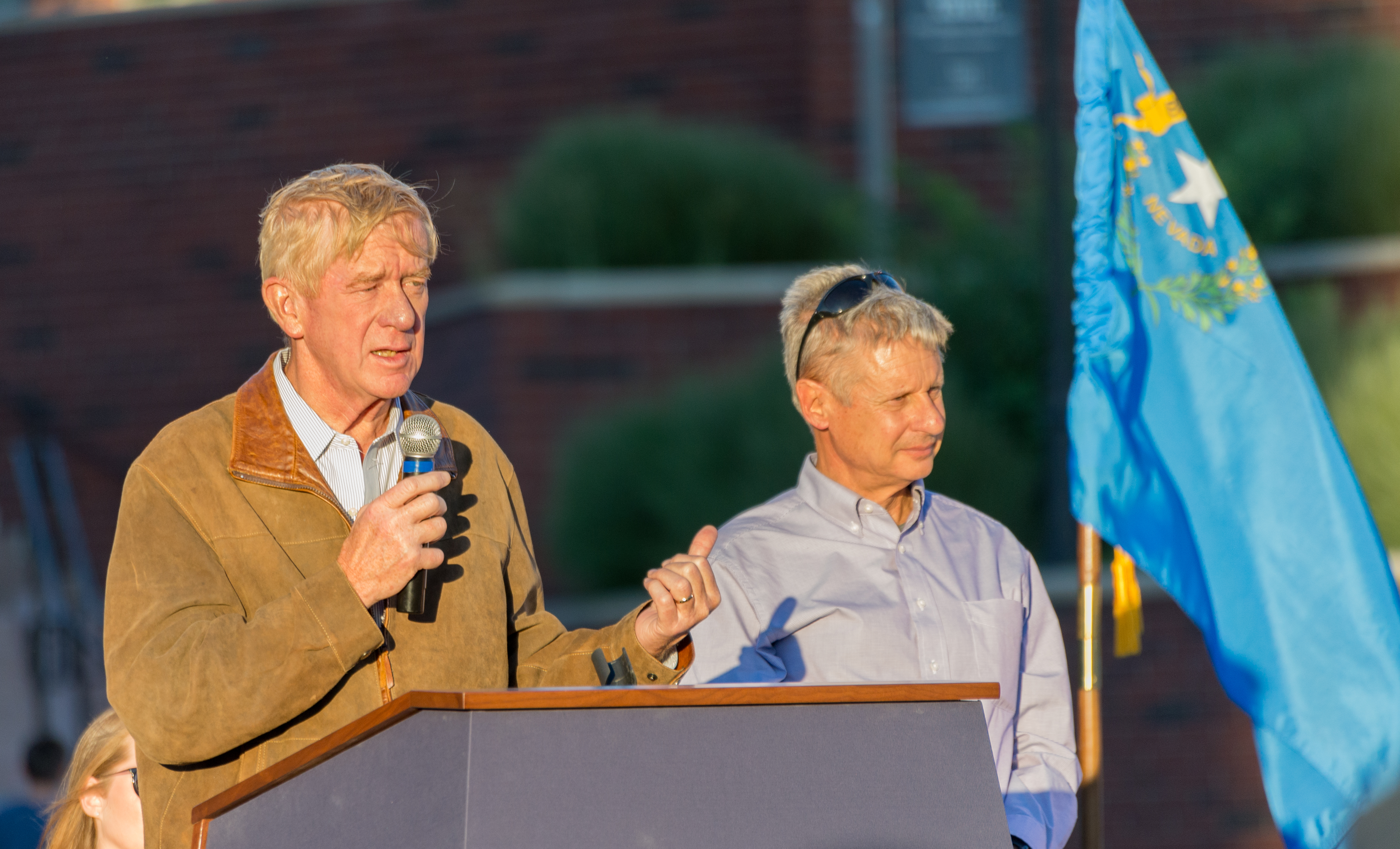
Weld campaigning with Johnson

On May 17, 2016, former New Mexico Governor Gary Johnson, the Libertarian Party's 2012 presidential nominee and the leading candidate for its 2016 nomination, announced his selection of Weld to be his choice for running mate. The vice-presidential candidate is formally nominated separately from and after the presidential candidate under the Libertarian Party's rules, although as the presidential nominee Johnson was first allowed to speak about his endorsement of Weld. Both candidates won their nominations on a second ballot after narrowly failing to attain an absolute majority on the first ballot. Weld accepted the Libertarian Party's nomination for vice president at the Libertarian National Convention in Orlando, Florida on May 29.

During the campaign, Weld took the lead on fundraising operations, as well as appearing on national television and at campaign rallies across the nation. Together, Johnson and Weld were the first presidential ticket to consist of two governors since the 1948 election when Thomas Dewey of New York ran as a Republican with Earl Warren of California and Strom Thurmond of South Carolina ran as a States' Rights Democrat with Fielding L. Wright of Mississippi. Despite polling higher than any third-party campaign since Ross Perot in 1992, Johnson and Weld were excluded from the debates controlled by the Commission on Presidential Debates and their poll numbers subsequently declined.

Nationwide, the Johnson/Weld ticket received 4,488,919 votes (3.3%), breaking the Libertarian Party's record for both absolute vote total (previously 1,275,923 for Johnson in 2012) and percentage (previously 1.1% for Ed Clark and David Koch in 1980).

=== 2020 presidential campaign ===
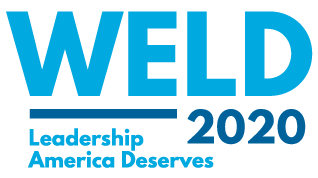
Weld's 2020 campaign logo

On January 17, 2019, Weld rejoined the Republican Party, increasing speculation that he would run for president. On February 14, 2019, Weld announced that he was launching a presidential exploratory committee for the 2020 Republican primary, against incumbent Republican president Donald Trump. Appearing on Bloomberg News, Weld suggested that he could beat Trump in 2020 with help from independent voters. He accused Trump on CNN the same weekend of having "showed contempt for the American people." Weld said Trump had made no effort to combat the effects of climate change: "We've got the polar ice cap that's going to melt with devastating consequences if we don't get carbon out of the atmosphere", Weld promised that he would plan ahead for an "environmental catastrophe."

On April 15, 2019, Weld formally announced his candidacy for President of the United States on The Lead with Jake Tapper. Weld received 1.3% of the vote in the Iowa caucuses and one pledged delegate on February 3, 2020.

Weld suspended his campaign on March 18, 2020.

After ending his campaign, Weld announced that he voted for Joe Biden and Kamala Harris.

=== Other activities ===
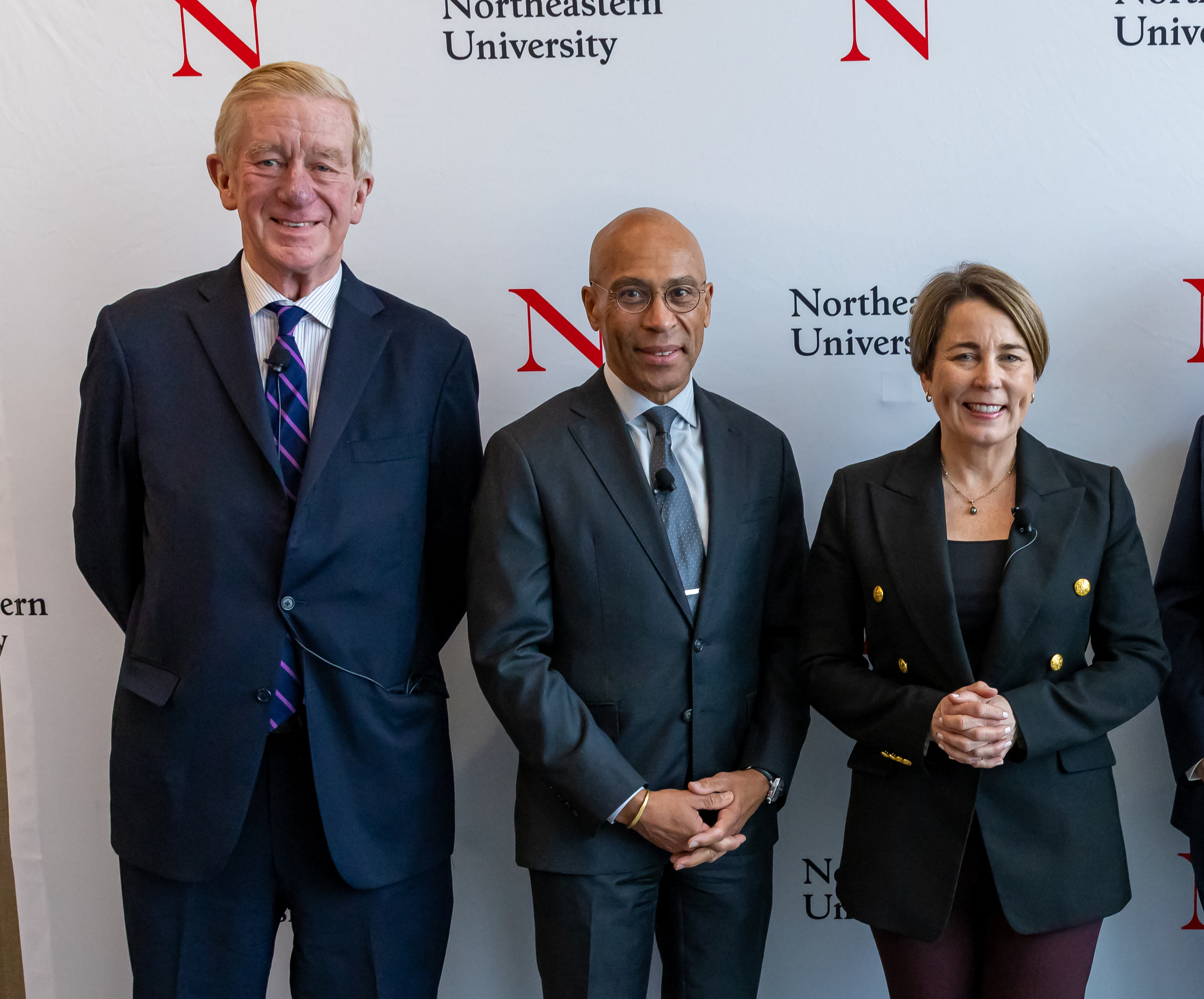
Weld (left) in 2024 with former Massachusetts Governor Deval Patrick and the incumbent governor Maura Healey

Weld is a member of the Council on Foreign Relations. He co-chaired its Independent Task Force on North America, which studied the liberalization of markets and free trade between the United States, Canada, and Mexico. He was a principal at Leeds, Weld & Co., which describes itself as the United States's largest private equity fund focused on investing in the education and training industry. Weld serves on the board of directors of Acreage Holdings.

After leaving the governorship, he turned to writing fiction, and published three novels: Mackerel by Moonlight (1998), Big Ugly (1999), both contemporary political satires, and Stillwater (2002), a historical work about the towns and farms flooded by the new Quabbin Reservoir in 1938.

In February 2013, Weld publicly supported legal recognition for same-sex marriage in an amicus brief submitted to the U.S. Supreme Court.

Weld joined Our America Initiative's 2016 Liberty Tour a number of times, speaking alongside other libertarian leaders and activists such as Law Enforcement Against Prohibition executive director and former Baltimore Police Chief Neill Franklin, Free the People's Matt Kibbe, Republican activists Ed Lopez and Liz Mair, Conscious Capitalism's Alex McCobin, Reason Foundation's David Nott, Foundation for Economic Education's Jeffrey Tucker, and the Libertarian Party's Carla Howell (as well as some speakers not ordinarily associated with libertarianism, such as author and journalist Naomi Wolf); the tour raised "awareness about third party inclusion in national presidential debates" and "spread the message of liberty and libertarian thought."

Throughout 2017 and 2018, Weld appeared at several state Libertarian Party conventions and endorsed various Libertarian candidates in the 2018 United States elections. In January 2019, Weld changed his party affiliation back to Republican, in preparation for his presidential run as a Republican.

Weld currently works as a lobbyist for ML Strategies. Weld's primary areas of focus as a lobbyist are helping c-level executives navigate competition, white collar investigation and litigation, and "dealing with government at all levels". Weld also specializes in ESG consulting at ML Strategies.

Weld also sits on the bipartisan advisory board of States United Democracy Center.

After President Joe Biden withdrew his bid for reelection, Weld announced that he would vote for Kamala Harris and Tim Walz in the 2024 election.

== Personal life ==
Weld married Susan Roosevelt, a great-granddaughter of Theodore Roosevelt, on June 7, 1975. Susan Roosevelt was a professor at Harvard University specializing in ancient Chinese civilization and law, and she later served as General Counsel to the Congressional-Executive Commission on China. The Welds had five children: David Minot (born 1976), a professor of physics at the University of California, Santa Barbara; Ethel Derby (born 1977), a physician; Mary Blake (born 1979), an attorney; Quentin Roosevelt (born 1981), an attorney; and Frances Wylie (born 1983), who has worked for the San Francisco Giants. The couple divorced in 2002.

Weld's second and present wife is writer Leslie Marshall. They live in Canton, Massachusetts.

Weld plays blindfold chess. He is a fan of the Grateful Dead, and following the death of Jerry Garcia said “More than any one song, it was just the consistently mellow approach they took to everything, life as well as music.”

Weld is an Episcopalian.

== Writings ==
Weld has written three mass market novels:

- Stillwater (2003) ISBN 0-15-602723-2
- Mackerel by Moonlight (1999) ISBN 0-671-03874-5
- Big Ugly (2002) ISBN 0-7434-1037-8

== Electoral history ==
2016 United States presidential election
Party	Candidate	Votes	%
Republican	Donald Trump / Mike Pence	62,985,153	45.9%
Democratic	Hillary Clinton / Tim Kaine	65,853,677	48.0
Libertarian	Gary Johnson / Bill Weld	4,489,359	3.27
Green	Jill Stein / Ajamu Baraka	1,457,288	1.1
Independent	Evan McMullin / Mindy Finn	732,409	0.5
Independent	Other third-party candidates	453,896	0.3
Write-in		1,171,436	0.9
Total votes		137,143,218	100.0

1996 United States Senate election in Massachusetts
Party	Candidate	Votes	%	±%
Democratic	John Kerry (incumbent)	1,334,345	52.7%	▼1.77
Republican	Bill Weld	1,142,837	45.2%	▲4.2
Conservative	Susan C. Gallagher	70,013	2.8%	N/A
Natural Law	Robert C. Stowe	7,176	0.3%	N/A
Write-in		1,515	0.1%	▼0.0
Total votes		2,555,886	100.0%	

1994 Massachusetts gubernatorial election
Party	Candidate	Votes	%
Republican	Bill Weld (incumbent)	1,533,390	70.9
Democratic	Mark Roosevelt	611,650	28.3
Total votes		2,145,040	100.0

1990 Massachusetts gubernatorial election
Party	Candidate	Votes	%	±%
Republican	Bill Weld	1,175,817	50.2	▲20.63
Democratic	John Silber	1,099,878	46.9	▼18.2
Independent	Leonard Umina	62,703	2.7	–
Independent	Dorothy Stevens (write-in)	872	0.0	–
Total votes		2,339,270	100.0	

1978 Massachusetts attorney general election
Party	Candidate	Votes	%
Democratic	Francis X. Bellotti (incumbent)	1,532,835	78.4
Republican	Bill Weld	421,417	21.6
Total votes		2,044,076	100.0

Legal offices
Preceded by Edward Harrington	United States Attorney for the District of Massachusetts; 1981–1986	Succeeded by Robert Mueller; Acting
Preceded by Stephen S. Trott	United States Assistant Attorney General for the Criminal Division; 1986–1988	Succeeded by Edward Dennis
Party political offices
Preceded by Josiah Spaulding	Republican nominee for Attorney General of Massachusetts; 1978	Succeeded by Richard Wainwright
Preceded by George Kariotis	Republican nominee for Governor of Massachusetts; 1990, 1994	Succeeded by Paul Cellucci
Preceded by Jim Rappaport	Republican nominee for U.S. Senator from Massachusetts (Class 2); 1996	Succeeded by Jeff Beatty (2008)
Preceded by Jim Gray	Libertarian nominee for Vice President of the United States; 2016	Succeeded by Spike Cohen
Political offices
Preceded by Michael Dukakis	Governor of Massachusetts; 1991–1997	Succeeded by Paul Cellucci
U.S. order of precedence (ceremonial)
Preceded by Michael Dukakis as Former Governor	Order of precedence of the United States	Succeeded by Deval Patrick as Former Governor
