= Samuel Rotondi =

American politician

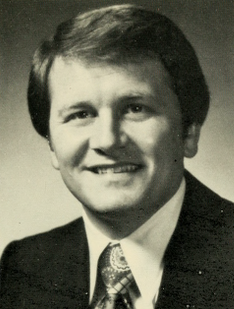

Member of the Massachusetts State Senate from the Fourth Middlesex District
- In office 1977–1983
- Preceded by: John W. Bullock
- Succeeded by: Dick Kraus

Personal details
- Born: April 22, 1946 (age 80) Stoneham, Massachusetts
- Party: Democratic
- Education: Brown University; Suffolk University Law School

Samuel Rotondi (born April 22, 1946, in Stoneham, Massachusetts) is an American attorney and politician who represented the Fourth Middlesex District in the Massachusetts Senate from 1977 to 1983. He was an unsuccessful candidate for Lieutenant Governor of Massachusetts in 1982 and the United States House of Representatives (7th congressional district) in 1984.
