= Lou Nickinello =

American politician

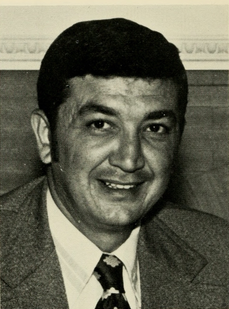
- Nickinello c. 1975

Executive Director of Massachusetts Port Authority
- In office January 10 – January 20, 1983
- Preceded by: David W. Davis
- Succeeded by: David W. Davis

Member of the Massachusetts House of Representatives
- In office 1971–1983
- Preceded by: Francis Keane
- Succeeded by: Joseph M. Connolly
- Constituency: 40th Middlesex (1971–1975); 55th Middlesex (1975–1979); 5th Middlesex (1979–1983)

Personal details
- Born: September 8, 1940 (age 86) East Boston, Massachusetts
- Party: Democratic
- Education: Bentley College

Louis R. "Lou" Nickinello (born September 8, 1940 in East Boston) is an American businessman and politician who served in the Massachusetts House of Representatives from 1971 to 1983. In 1982 he was an unsuccessful candidate for Lieutenant Governor of Massachusetts.

Nickinello was appointed Executive Director of the Massachusetts Port Authority by Governor Edward J. King on King's last day in office. He was fired two weeks later after three board members appointed by new governor Michael S. Dukakis voted in favor of dismissing him. He was later appointed by Dukakis to serve as Massachusetts' Deputy Secretary of Transportation for Special Projects.

After leaving politics, Nickinello served as President of Ackerley Communications' (later AK Media) business in Massachusetts, a billboard company. He was fired in 1997 after a federal investigation into his dealings with Congressman Bud Shuster.
