= John Lakian =

American businessman

John Lakian is a businessman and former gubernatorial candidate of Massachusetts. He has founded several businesses, and served on the board on many others. He had an unsuccessful run for governor that resulted in a high-profile lawsuit in 1982, and an unsuccessful bid for U.S. Senate in 1994. Lakian served in Vietnam and was awarded a Bronze Star.

== Businessman ==
Lakian is the founder and current board chairman of the Fort Hill Group, Inc., an investment banking and venture capital firm based in New York City. In 1986, he launched McKinley and Allsopp, a brokerage firm that provides investment-banking services. His financial service companies have served a number of high-profile Wall Street firms, including Paine Webber, Merrill Lynch, Deutsche Bank and Solomon Smith Barney.

In 1994, Lakian led a group that founded First New England Dental, a dental practice holding company in New England. The Company attempted a public offering in 1997, but was unsuccessful and filed for bankruptcy the following year.

Lakian is the current CEO of Living Independently Group, a company which develops monitoring system to assist in the care of senior citizens. He has served on the boards of Merchants Capital, Mr. Coffee, JoS. A. Bank Clothiers, Peoples Department Stores, Apparel Marketing Corporation, FNEDC, Sheffield Medical Technologies, The Molloy Group, and Standard Life of Indiana.

== Politician ==
In 1982, John Lakian ran for the Republican party nomination for governor. He was the early favorite after securing the party's endorsement. Lakian spent nearly $1 million on his failed bid. After a The Boston Globe story revealed that he had made several exaggerations about his background, he was forced to publicly confess and lost the nomination to John W. Sears. Supporters blamed the loss on The Globe, claiming it had unfairly defamed Lakian.

As a result, Lakian sued The Globe for libel, claiming $50 million in damages. The court case drew national media attention and eventually resulted in The Globe being cleared of all charges. The jury found that the article contained some false information, but awarded no judgment, stating that Lakian had failed to prove any actual harm. Lakian appealed and the case was finally resolved in 1987 when the Massachusetts Supreme Court rejected the appeal.

Lakian returned to politics in 1994 to challenge Mitt Romney for the Republican nomination for U.S. Senate. Lakian outspent his rival but was defeated by Romney who won the nomination.

== Legal issues ==
On Friday, February 5, 2016, John Lakian pleaded guilty to two counts of securities fraud for defrauding investors out of millions of dollars in two separate schemes. When sentenced, he faces a maximum sentence of 20 years' imprisonment on each count.

Between 2009 and 2013, John Lakian and his partner Diane Lamm were involved in two schemes to steal investors' money. In the first, the defendants obtained more than $11 million by promising Capital L investors that their money would be used to purchase, consolidate, and sell registered investment advisory businesses. Instead, Lakian and Lamm diverted more than $3 million of it to themselves and to entities they owned and controlled. In the second scheme, the defendants perpetrated their fraud through their management of the liquidation of Aegis Capital, a North Carolina–based investment fund. Instead of returning investment proceeds to investors, Lakian and Lamm diverted more than $2 million of investors' money to themselves and to restaurant businesses they controlled.

He has been charged with investment and bank fraud. According to Robert L. Capers, United States Attorney for the Eastern District of New York, "The defendants played a confidence game, stealing investors' hard-earned money through lies and deceit to use for their own purposes". "We remain steadfast in our commitment to the investigation and prosecution of those who prey on investors and enrich themselves by means of financial fraud."

== Personal life ==
John Lakian attended Boston University and served as a lieutenant in the United States Army during the Vietnam war. He was awarded a Bronze Star with a "V" for valor for his combat operations.
