= List of presidents of the New Hampshire Senate =

The position of President of the New Hampshire Senate was created when the New Hampshire Senate was founded in 1784.

Image	Name	Took office	Left office	Party	Residence
	Woodbury Langdon	1784	1785		Portsmouth, New Hampshire
	John McClary	1785	1787		Epsom, New Hampshire
	Joseph Gilman	1787	1788		Exeter, New Hampshire
	John Pickering	1788	1790		Portsmouth, New Hampshire
	Ebenezer Smith	1790	1791		Meredith, New Hampshire
	Moses Dow	1791	1792		Haverhill, New Hampshire
	Ebenezer Smith	1792	1793		Meredith, New Hampshire
	Abiel Foster	1793	1793	Federalist	Canterbury, New Hampshire
	Oliver Peabody	1794	1794		Exeter, New Hampshire
	Ebenezer Smith	1795	1796		Meredith, New Hampshire
	Amos Shepard	1797	1803		Alstead, New Hampshire
	Nicholas Gilman	1804	1804	Democratic-Republican	Exeter, New Hampshire
	Clement Storer	1805	1807	Democratic-Republican	Portsmouth, New Hampshire
	Samuel Bell	1807	1808	Democratic-Republican	Londonderry, New Hampshire
	Moses P. Payson	1809	1809		Bath, New Hampshire
	William Plumer	1810	1811	Democratic-Republican	Epping, New Hampshire
	Joshua Darling	1812	1812		Henniker, New Hampshire
	Oliver Peabody	1813	1813		Exeter, New Hampshire
	Moses P. Payson	1814	1815		Bath, New Hampshire
	William Badger	1816	1817		Gilmanton, New Hampshire
	Jonathan Harvey	1817	1822	Democratic-Republican	Sutton, New Hampshire
	David L. Morril	1823	1823	Democratic-Republican	Goffstown, New Hampshire
	Josiah Bartlet	1824	1825		Stratham, New Hampshire
	Mathew Harvey	1825	1828		Hopkinton, New Hampshire
	Nahum Parker	1828	1829		Fitzwilliam, New Hampshire
	Abner Greenleaf	1829	1829		Portsmouth, New Hampshire
	Samuel Cartland	1829	1829		Haverhill, New Hampshire
	Joseph M. Harper	1830	1830		Canterbury, New Hampshire
	Samuel Cartland	1831	1831		Haverhill, New Hampshire
	Benning M. Bean	1831	1832	Democratic-Republican	Moultonborough, New Hampshire
	Jared W. Williams	1833	1834		Lancaster, New Hampshire
	Charles F. Grove	1835	1835		Goffstown, New Hampshire
	James Clark	1836	1836		Franklin, New Hampshire
	John Woodbury	1837	1837		Salem, New Hampshire
	Samuel Jones	1838	1838		Bradford, New Hampshire
	James McK. Wilkins	1839	1839		Bedford, New Hampshire
	James B. Creighton	1840	1840		Newmarket, New Hampshire
	Josiah Quincy	1841	1842		Rumney, New Hampshire
	Titus Brown	1843	1843	National Republican	Francestown, New Hampshire
	Timothy Hoskins	1844	1844		Westmoreland, New Hampshire
	Asa P. Cate	1845	1845		Northfield, New Hampshire
	James U. Parker	1846	1846		Merrimack, New Hampshire
	Harry Hibbard	1847	1848	Democratic	Bath, New Hampshire
	William P. Weeks	1849	1849		Canaan, New Hampshire
	Richard Jenness	1850	1851		Portsmouth, New Hampshire
	John S. Wells	1851	1852	Democratic	Durham, New Hampshire
	James M. Rix	1853	1853	Democratic	Lancaster, New Hampshire
	J. Everett Sargent	1854	1855		Wentworth, New Hampshire
	William Haile	1855	1855		Hinsdale, New Hampshire
	Thomas J. Melvin	1856	1856		Chester, New Hampshire
	Moody Currier	1857	1857	Democratic	Manchester, New Hampshire
	Austin F. Pike	1858	1858	Republican	Hebron, New Hampshire
	Joseph A. Gilmore	1859	1859		Concord, New Hampshire
	George S. Towle	1860	1860		Lebanon, New Hampshire
	Herman Foster	1861	1861		Manchester, New Hampshire
	William H. Y. Hackett	1862	1862		Portsmouth, New Hampshire
	Onslow Stearns	1863	1863		Concord, New Hampshire
	Charles H. Bell	1864	1864	Republican	Exeter, New Hampshire
	Ezekiel A. Straw	1865	1866	Republican	Salisbury, New Hampshire
	Daniel Barnard	1866	1867		Franklin, New Hampshire
	William T. Parker	1867	1868		Merrimack, New Hampshire
	Ezra A. Stevens	1868	1869		Portsmouth, New Hampshire
	John Y. Mugridge	1869	1870		Concord, New Hampshire
	Nathanial Gordon	1870	1871		Exeter, New Hampshire
	George W. M. Pittman	1871	1872		Bartlett, New Hampshire
	Charles H. Campbell	1872	1873		Nashua, New Hampshire
	David A. Wade	1873	1874		Concord, New Hampshire
	William H. Grove	1874	1875		Weare, New Hampshire
	John W. Sanborn	1875	1876		Wakefield, New Hampshire
	Charles Holman	1876	1877		Nashua, New Hampshire
	Nathaniel Head	1877	1878		Hooksett, New Hampshire
	David H. Buffum	1878	1879		Somersworth, New Hampshire
	Jacob H. Gallinger	1879	1881	Republican	Concord, New Hampshire
	John Kimball	1881	1883	Republican	Concord, New Hampshire
	Charles H. Bartlett	1883	1885		Manchester, New Hampshire
	Chester Pike	1885	1887	Republican	Cornish, New Hampshire
	Frank Dunklee Currier	1887	1889	Republican	Canaan, New Hampshire
	David A. Taggart	1889	1891	Republican	Manchester, New Hampshire
	John McLane	1891	1895	Republican	Milford, New Hampshire
	Frank W. Rollins	1895	1897	Republican	Concord, New Hampshire
	Chester B. Jordan	1897	1899	Republican	Colebrook, New Hampshire
	Thomas N. Hastings	1899	1901	Republican	Walpole, New Hampshire
	Bertram Ellis	1901	1903	Republican	Keene, New Hampshire
	Charles W. Hoitt	January 7, 1903	1905	Republican	Nashua, New Hampshire
	George H. Adams	January 4, 1905	1907	Republican	Plymouth, New Hampshire
	John Scammon	January 2, 1907	1909	Republican	Exeter, New Hampshire
	Harry T. Lord	1909	1911	Republican	Manchester, New Hampshire
	William D. Swart	1911	1913	Republican	Nashua, New Hampshire
	Enos K. Sawyer	1913	1915	Democratic	Franklin, New Hampshire
	George I. Haselton	1915	1917	Republican	Manchester, New Hampshire
	Jesse M. Barton	1917	1919	Republican	Newport, New Hampshire
	Arthur P. Morrill	1919	1921	Republican	Concord, New Hampshire
	Leslie P. Snow	1921	1923	Republican	Rochester, New Hampshire
	Wesley Adams	1923	1925	Republican	Londonderry, New Hampshire
	Charles W. Tobey	1925	1927	Republican	Temple, New Hampshire
	Frank P. Tilton	1927	1929	Republican	Laconia, New Hampshire
	Harold K. Davison	1929	1931	Republican	Woodsville, New Hampshire
	Arthur R. Jones	1931	1933	Republican	Keene, New Hampshire
	George D. Cummings	1933	1935	Republican	Peterborough, New Hampshire
	Charles M. Dale	1935	1937	Republican	Portsmouth, New Hampshire
	Anson C. Alexander	1937	1939	Republican	Boscawen, New Hampshire
	Robert O. Blood	1939	1941	Republican	Concord, New Hampshire
	William M. Cole	1941	1943	Republican	Derry, New Hampshire
	Ansel N. Sanborn	1943	1945	Republican	Wakefield, New Hampshire
	Donald G. Matson	1945	1947	Republican	Concord, New Hampshire
	Charles H. Barnard	1947	1949	Republican	Manchester, New Hampshire
	Perkins Bass	1949	1951	Republican	Peterborough, New Hampshire
	Blaylock Atherton	1951	1953	Republican	Nashua, New Hampshire
	Lane Dwinell	1953	1955	Republican	Lebanon, New Hampshire
	Raymond K. Perkins	1955	1957	Republican	Concord, New Hampshire
	Eralsey C. Ferguson	1957	1959	Republican	Pittsfield, New Hampshire
	Norman A. Packard	1959	1961	Republican	Manchester, New Hampshire
	Samuel Green	1961	1963	Republican	Manchester, New Hampshire
	Phillip S. Dunlap	1963	1965	Republican	Hopkinton, New Hampshire
	Stewart Lamprey	1965	1969	Republican	Moultonborough, New Hampshire
	Arthur Tufts	1969	1970	Republican	Exeter, New Hampshire
	John R. Bradshaw	1971	1972	Republican	Nelson, New Hampshire
	David L. Nixon	1973	1974	Republican	New Boston, New Hampshire
	Alf E. Jacobson	1975	1979	Republican	New London, New Hampshire
	Robert B. Monier	1979	1982	Republican	Goffstown, New Hampshire
	Vesta M. Roy	1982	1986	Republican	Salem, New Hampshire
	William S. Bartlett, Jr.	1987	1990	Republican	Kingston, New Hampshire
	Edward C. Dupont, Jr.	1991	1993	Republican	Rochester, New Hampshire
	Ralph D. Hough	1993	1994	Republican	Lebanon, New Hampshire
	Joseph L. Delahunty	1995	1999	Republican	Salem, New Hampshire
	Clesson J. Blaisdell	1999	August 1999	Democratic	Keene, New Hampshire
	Beverly Hollingworth	August 1999	2000	Democratic	Hampton, New Hampshire
	Arthur P. Klemm, Jr.	December 6, 2000	2002	Republican	Windham, New Hampshire
	Thomas R. Eaton	2002	September 9, 2005	Republican	Keene, New Hampshire
	Theodore Gatsas	2005	2006	Republican	Manchester, New Hampshire
	Sylvia Larsen	2006	2010	Democratic	Concord, New Hampshire
	Peter Bragdon	2010	2013	Republican	Amherst, New Hampshire
	Chuck Morse	August 27, 2013	December 5, 2018	Republican	Salem, New Hampshire
	Donna Soucy	December 5, 2018	December 2, 2020	Democratic	Manchester, New Hampshire
	Chuck Morse	December 2, 2020	December 7, 2022	Republican	Salem, New Hampshire
	Jeb Bradley	December 7, 2022	December 4, 2024	Republican	Wolfeboro, New Hampshire
	Sharon Carson	December 4, 2024	present	Republican	

== See also ==
- List of New Hampshire General Courts
