= Senator Hastings (disambiguation) =

Daniel O. Hastings (1874–1966) was a U.S. Senator from Delaware from 1928 to 1937. Senator Hastings may also refer to:

- Clifford C. Hastings (1882–1946), New York State Senate
- David Hastings (politician) (2000s–2010s), Maine State Senate
- F. W. Hastings (1848–1935), Washington State Senate
- Fred W. Hastings (1882–1932), Washington State Senate
- Frederick H. Hastings (1818–1869, New York State Senate
- James F. Hastings (1926–2014), New York State Senate
- Jay Hastings (1878–1939), Nebraska State Senate
- John A. Hastings (1900–1964), New York State Senate
- Michael Hastings (politician) (born 1980), Illinois State Senate
- Seth Hastings (1762–1831), Massachusetts State Senate
- Thomas N. Hastings (1858–1907), New Hampshire Senate
- William Soden Hastings (1798–1842), Massachusetts State Senate
