= Thomas Eaton =

Thomas or Tom Eaton may refer to:

- Thomas M. Eaton (1896–1939), U.S. Representative from California
- Thomas Eaton (general) (1739–1809), military officer in the North Carolina militia
- Thomas R. Eaton, New Hampshire businessman and politician
- Tom Eaton (comedian), American prop comic
- Tom Eaton (musician), American multi-instrumentalist, composer, producer, and engineer
