= Gov. Frank West Rollins House =

Historic house in New Hampshire, United States

- U.S. National Register of Historic Places
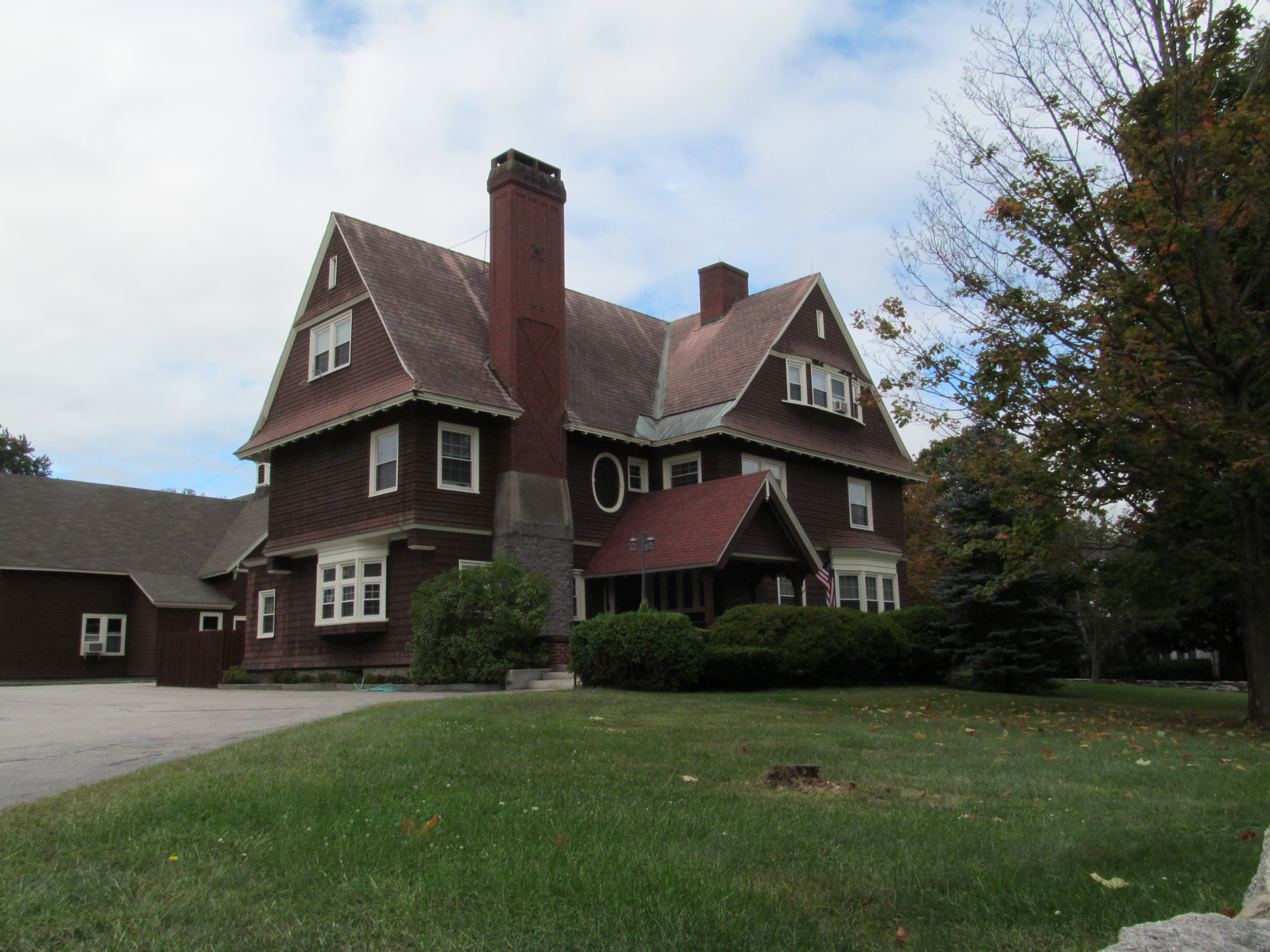

- Location within New Hampshire Location within the United States
- Location: 135 N. State St., Concord, New Hampshire
- Coordinates: 43°12′50″N 71°31′43″W
- Area: 0.5 acres (0.20 ha)
- Built: 1890
- Architect: Andrews, Jaques & Rantoul
- Architectural style: Shingle Style
- NRHP reference No.: 84003225
- Added to NRHP: March 15, 1984

The Gov. Frank West Rollins House is a historic house at 135 North State Street in Concord, New Hampshire, United States. The house was built in 1890 for Frank West Rollins, a politician and eventual governor of New Hampshire, by the Boston firm of Andrews, Jaques & Rantoul. It is one of the most elaborate area instances of Shingle style architecture. The house was listed on the National Register of Historic Places in 1984.

== Description and history ==
The Governor Frank West Rollins House is located north of downtown Concord, at the southwest corner of Church and North State Streets. It is set just north of the former St. Peter Catholic Church building, whose rectory it served as for many years. It is a 2 1/2-story wood-frame structure, with an L-shaped layout and a cross-gabled roof. The exterior is finished in wooden shingles. The gable ends project beyond the many body, with a flare at the base. Window bays project in several places, and the entrance is sheltered by a gabled porch. The interior is lavishly decorated in Colonial Revival woodwork. On the third floor is a bedroom that was designed to resemble a ship's cabin.

The house was built in 1890, and is one of the city's unparalleled examples of Shingle and Colonial Revival architecture. It was designed by the Boston firm of Andrews, Jaques & Rantoul, and was featured in New Hampshire Homes for its elegance and attention to detail. The "Ship Room" was designed by the naval architects Burgess and Packard, again with meticulous attention to detail. Frank Rollins, a native of Rollinsford, was a successful banker when he entered politics in 1894, and he was elected to a single term as Governor of New Hampshire, serving between 1899 and 1901.

In 2021, the property was renovated and rebranded as The Governors Center, which uses the historic house's rooms as office space and event venues.

== See also ==
- National Register of Historic Places listings in Merrimack County, New Hampshire
