= 1904 New Hampshire gubernatorial election =

- November 8, 1904
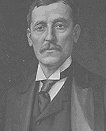

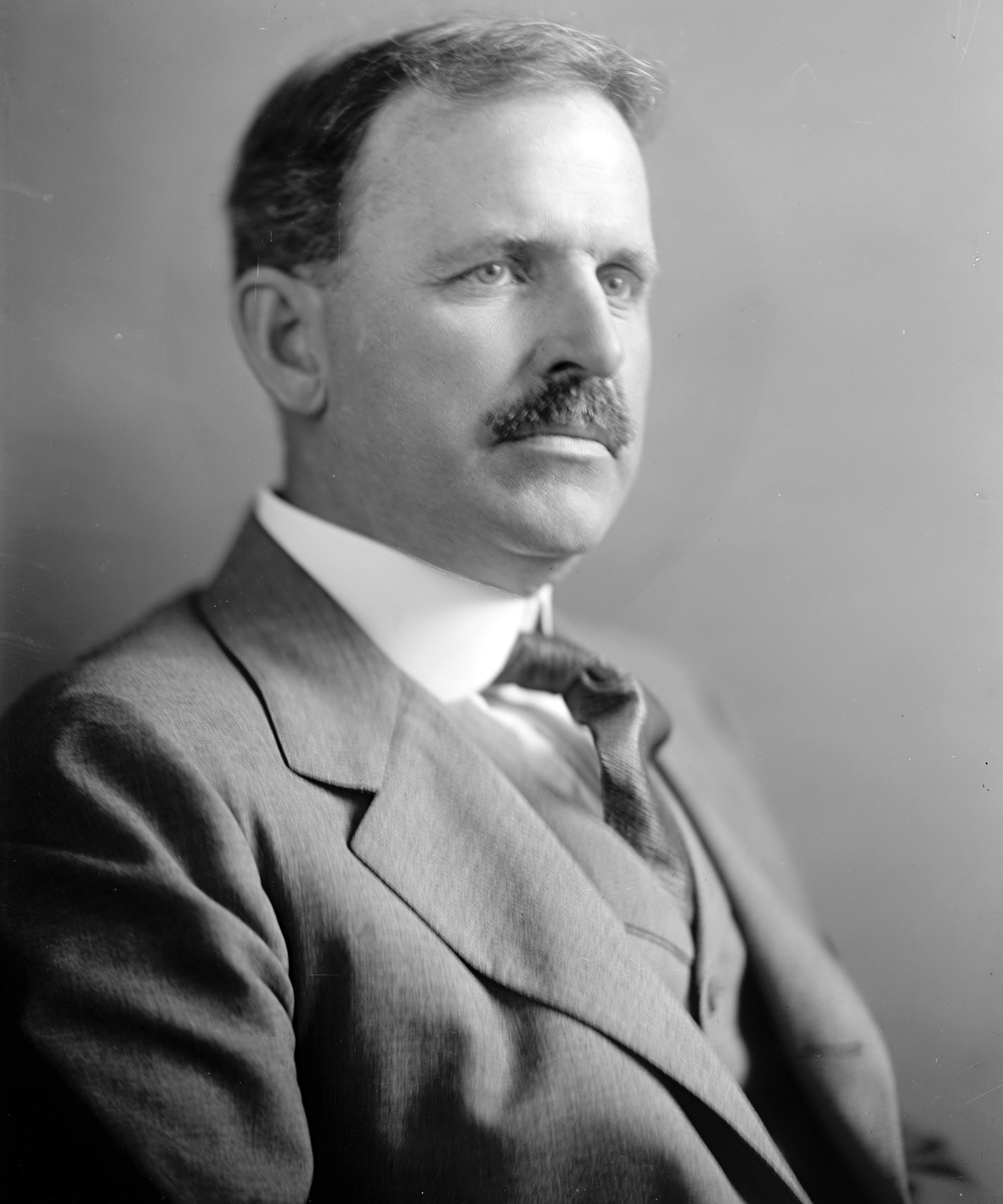
Nominee	John McLane	Henry F. Hollis
Party	Republican	Democratic
Popular vote	51,171	35,437
Percentage	57.83%	40.05%
- McLane: 40-50% 50–60% 60–70% 70–80% 80–90% >90% Hollis: 40-50% 50–60% 60–70% 70–80% 80–90% Tie: 50%
Governor before election
Nahum J. Bachelder
Republican
Elected Governor
John McLane
Republican

The 1904 New Hampshire gubernatorial election was held on November 8, 1904. Republican nominee John McLane defeated Democratic nominee Henry F. Hollis with 57.83% of the vote.

== General election ==
=== Candidates ===
Major party candidates

- John McLane, Republican
- Henry F. Hollis, Democratic

Other candidates

- Sumner F. Claflin, Socialist
- David Heald, Prohibition
- George Howie, People's

=== Results ===
1904 New Hampshire gubernatorial election
Party	Candidate	Votes	%	±%
Republican	John McLane	51,171	57.83%	
Democratic	Henry F. Hollis	35,437	40.05%	
Socialist	Sumner F. Claflin	943	1.07%	
Prohibition	David Heald	857	0.97%	
Populist	George Howie	58	0.07%	
Majority		15,734		
Turnout				
Republican hold		Swing		
