= Senator Blaisdell =

Senator Blaisdell may refer to:

- Clesson J. Blaisdell (1926–1999), New Hampshire State Senate
- Daniel Blaisdell (1762–1833), New Hampshire State Senate
