= Senator Charbonneau =

Senator Charbonneau may refer to:

- Ed Charbonneau (born 1943), Indiana State Senate
- Guy Charbonneau (1922–1998), Senate of Canada
- Rhona Charbonneau (1928–2017), New Hampshire State Senate
