= 1902 New Hampshire gubernatorial election =

- November 4, 1902
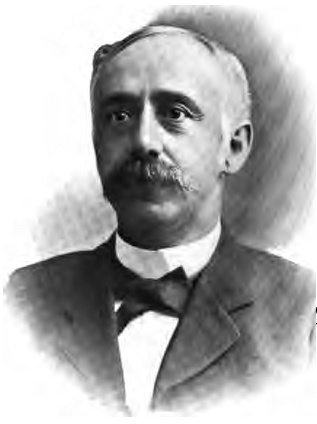

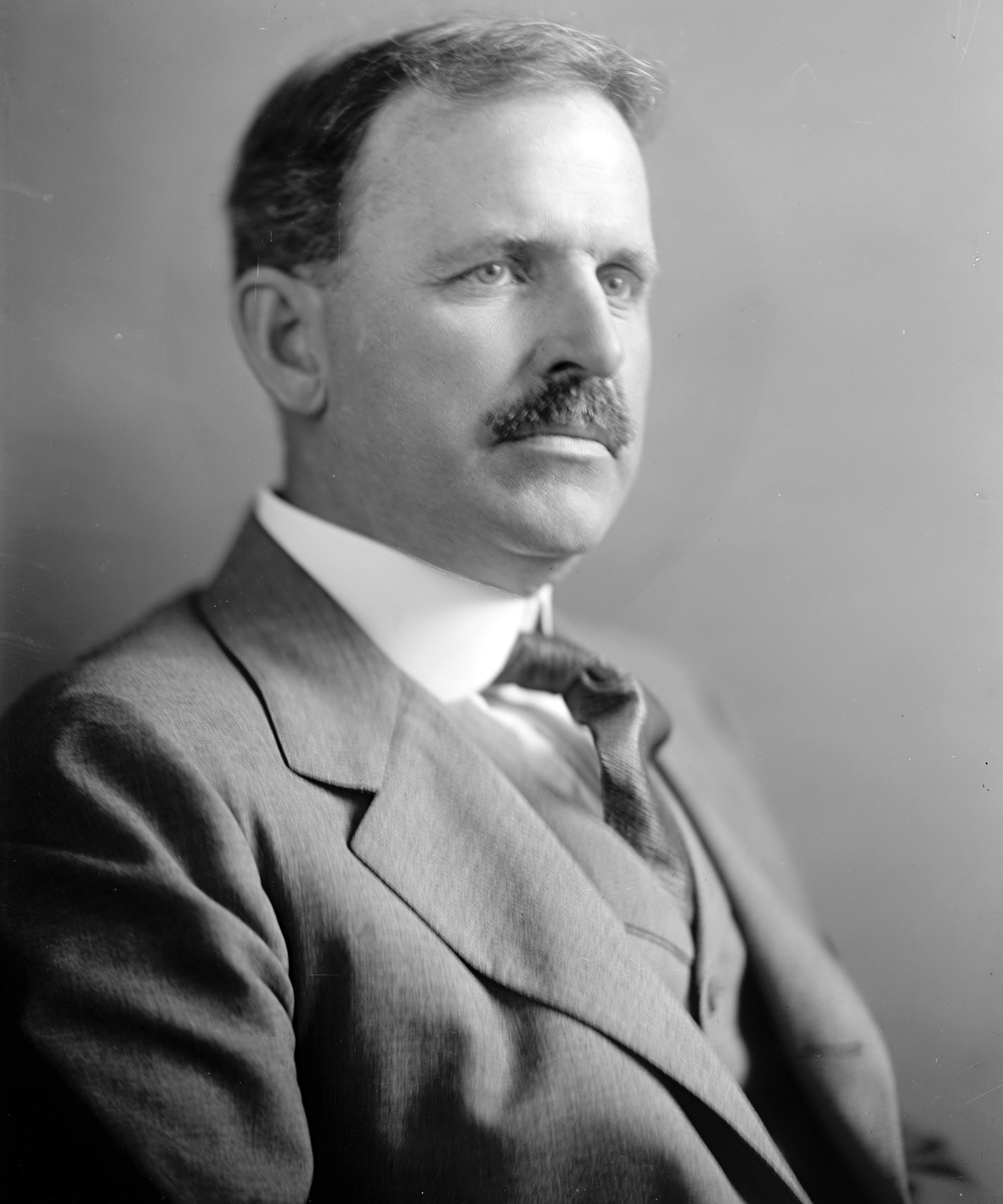
Nominee	Nahum J. Bachelder	Henry F. Hollis
Party	Republican	Democratic
Popular vote	42,115	33,844
Percentage	53.19%	42.75%
- Bachelder: 40-50% 50–60% 60–70% 70–80% 80–90% >90% Hollis: 40-50% 50–60% 60–70% 70–80% 80–90% Tie: 40-50%
Governor before election
Chester B. Jordan
Republican
Elected Governor
Nahum J. Bachelder
Republican

The 1902 New Hampshire gubernatorial election was held on November 4, 1902. Republican nominee Nahum J. Bachelder defeated Democratic nominee Henry F. Hollis with 53.19% of the vote.

== General election ==
=== Candidates ===
Major party candidates

- Nahum J. Bachelder, Republican
- Henry F. Hollis, Democratic

Other candidates

- John C. Berry, Prohibition
- Michael H. O'Neil, Socialist
- Alonzo Elliott, Independent
- George Howie, People's

=== Results ===
1902 New Hampshire gubernatorial election
Party	Candidate	Votes	%	±%
Republican	Nahum J. Bachelder	42,115	53.19%	
Democratic	Henry F. Hollis	33,844	42.75%	
Prohibition	John C. Berry	1,621	2.05%	
Socialist	Michael H. O'Neil	1,057	1.34%	
Independent	Alonzo Elliott	468	0.59%	
Populist	George Howie	57	0.07%	
Majority		8,271		
Turnout				
Republican hold		Swing		
