= Senator Eaton =

Senator Eaton may refer to:

== Members of the United States Senate ==
- John Eaton (politician) (1790–1856), U.S. Senator from Tennessee
- William W. Eaton (1816–1898), U.S. Senator from Connecticut

== United States state senate members ==
- Barney Augustus Eaton (1853–1936), Wisconsin State Senate
- Chris Eaton (politician) (born 1954), Minnesota State Senate
- Ernest T. Eaton (1877–1957), Montana State Senate
- Henry L. Eaton (1834–1890), Wisconsin State Senate
- Horace Eaton (1804–1855), Vermont State Senate
- Joe Oscar Eaton (1920–2008), Florida State Senate
- Lewis Eaton (1790–1857), New York State Senate
- Thomas R. Eaton (born c. 1949), New Hampshire State Senate
