= 1896 New Hampshire gubernatorial election =

- November 3, 1896
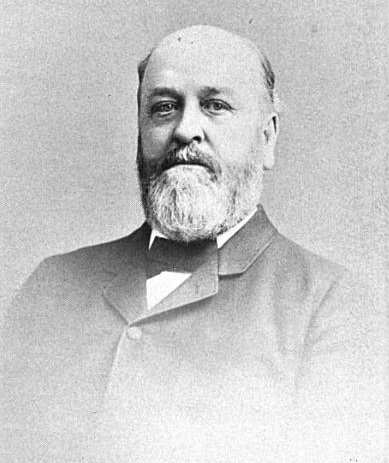

Nominee	George A. Ramsdell	Henry O. Kent
Party	Republican	Democratic
Popular vote	48,387	28,333
Percentage	61.41%	35.96%
- Ramsdell: 40-50% 50–60% 60–70% 70–80% 80–90% >90% Kent: 40-50% 50–60% 60–70% 70–80% >90% Tie: 40-50% 50%
Governor before election
Charles A. Busiel
Republican
Elected Governor
George A. Ramsdell
Republican

The 1896 New Hampshire gubernatorial election was held on November 3, 1896. Republican nominee George A. Ramsdell defeated Democratic nominee Henry O. Kent with 61.41% of the vote.

== General election ==
=== Candidates ===
Major party candidates

- George A. Ramsdell, Republican
- Henry O. Kent, Democratic

Other candidates

- John C. Berry, Prohibition
- Harry H. Acton, Socialist Labor
- Gardiner J. Greenleaf, People's
- George W. Barnard, Independent

=== Results ===
1896 New Hampshire gubernatorial election
Party	Candidate	Votes	%	±%
Republican	George A. Ramsdell	48,387	61.41%	
Democratic	Henry O. Kent	28,333	35.96%	
Prohibition	John C. Berry	1,057	1.34%	
Socialist Labor	Harry H. Acton	483	0.61%	
Populist	Gardiner J. Greenleaf	286	0.36%	
Independent	George W. Barnard	229	0.29%	
Majority		20,054		
Turnout				
Republican hold		Swing		
