= Senator Sawyer =

Senator Sawyer may refer to:

== Members of the United States Senate ==
- Frederick A. Sawyer (1822–1891), U.S. Senator from South Carolina
- Philetus Sawyer (1816–1900), U.S. Senator from Wisconsin from 1881 to 1893

== United States state senate members ==
- Enos K. Sawyer (1879–1933), New Hampshire State Senate
- Harry William Sawyer (1880–1962), Nevada State Senate
- Samuel Tredwell Sawyer (1800–1865), North Carolina State Senate
- Thomas C. Sawyer (born 1945), Ohio State Senate
- Timothy T. Sawyer (1817–1905), Massachusetts State Senate
- Tom Sawyer (Maine politician) (born 1949), Maine State Senate
- Vickie Sawyer (born 1970s), North Carolina State Senate
