= Senator Swart =

Senator Swart may refer to:

- Peter Swart (1752–1829), New York State Senate
- William D. Swart (1856–1936), New Hampshire State Senate
