= 1898 New Hampshire gubernatorial election =

- November 8, 1898
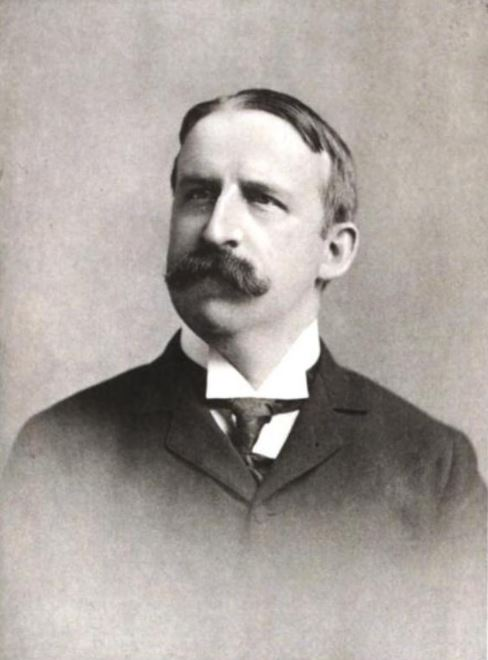

| Nominee | Frank W. Rollins | Charles F. Stone |
| Party | Republican | Democratic |
| Popular vote | 44,730 | 35,653 |
| Percentage | 54.24% | 43.23% |
- Rollins: 40-50% 50–60% 60–70% 70–80% 80–90% Stone: 40-50% 50–60% 60–70% 70–80% 80–90% Tie: 50%
Governor before election
George A. Ramsdell
Republican
Elected Governor
Frank W. Rollins
Republican

The 1898 New Hampshire gubernatorial election was held on November 8, 1898. Republican nominee Frank W. Rollins defeated Democratic nominee Charles F. Stone with 54.24% of the vote.

== General election ==
=== Candidates ===
Major party candidates

- Frank W. Rollins, Republican
- Charles F. Stone, Democratic

Other candidates

- Augustus G. Stevens, Prohibition
- Sumner F. Claflin, Social Democratic
- Benjamin T. Whitehouse, Socialist Labor
- Gardiner J. Greenleaf, People's

=== Results ===
1898 New Hampshire gubernatorial election
| Party | Candidate | Votes | % | ±% |
|---|---|---|---|---|
| Republican | Frank W. Rollins | 44,730 | 54.24% | |
| Democratic | Charles F. Stone | 35,653 | 43.23% | |
| Prohibition | Augustus G. Stevens | 1,333 | 1.62% | |
| Social Democratic | Sumner F. Claflin | 350 | 0.42% | |
| Socialist Labor | Benjamin T. Whitehouse | 263 | 0.32% | |
| Populist | Gardiner J. Greenleaf | 104 | 0.13% | |
| Majority | | 9,077 | | |
| Turnout | | | | |
| Republican hold | | Swing | | |
