= Governor McLane =

Governor McLane may refer to:

- John McLane (1852–1911), 50th Governor of New Hampshire
- Robert Milligan McLane (1815–1898), 39th Governor of Maryland
