= 2008 United States House of Representatives elections in New Hampshire =

- November 4, 2008

All 2 New Hampshire seats to the United States House of Representatives
	Majority party	Minority party
Party	Democratic	Republican
Last election	2	0
Seats won	2	0
Seat change	Steady	Steady
Popular vote	364,767	294,560
Percentage	54.08%	43.67%
Swing	▲2.07%	▼3.42%

Democratic
40–50%
50–60%
60–70%
70–80%
80–90%
90–100%
Republican
40–50%
50–60%
60–70%
70–80%
Tie
40–50%

The 2008 United States House of Representatives elections in New Hampshire were held on November 4, 2008, to determine who would represent the state of New Hampshire in the United States House of Representatives during the 111th Congress from January 3, 2009, until January 3, 2011. Both seats were held by Democratic incumbents before the election, which coincided with the 2008 presidential election, as well as the state's senatorial and gubernatorial elections.

The primary election was held on September 9, 2008. Republicans selected Former Representative Jeb Bradley and newspaper columnist and radio show host Jennifer Horn to challenge incumbent Representatives Carol Shea-Porter and Paul Hodes. Although CQ Politics had forecast the First Congressional District to be at risk for a change of party control, both incumbents were re-elected.

== Overview ==
United States House of Representatives elections in New Hampshire, 2008
Party	Votes	Percentage	Seats	+/–
Democratic	364,767	54.08%	2	-
Republican	294,560	43.67%	0	-
Libertarian	15,221	2.26%	0	-
Totals	674,548	100.00%	2	-

=== Match-up summary ===
District	Incumbent	2010 Status	Democratic	Republican	Libertarian
1	Carol Shea-Porter	Re-election	Carol Shea-Porter	Jeb Bradley	Robert Kingsbury
2	Paul Hodes	Re-election	Paul Hodes	Jennifer Horn	Chester L. Lapointe, II

== District 1 ==
2008 New Hampshire's 1st congressional district election
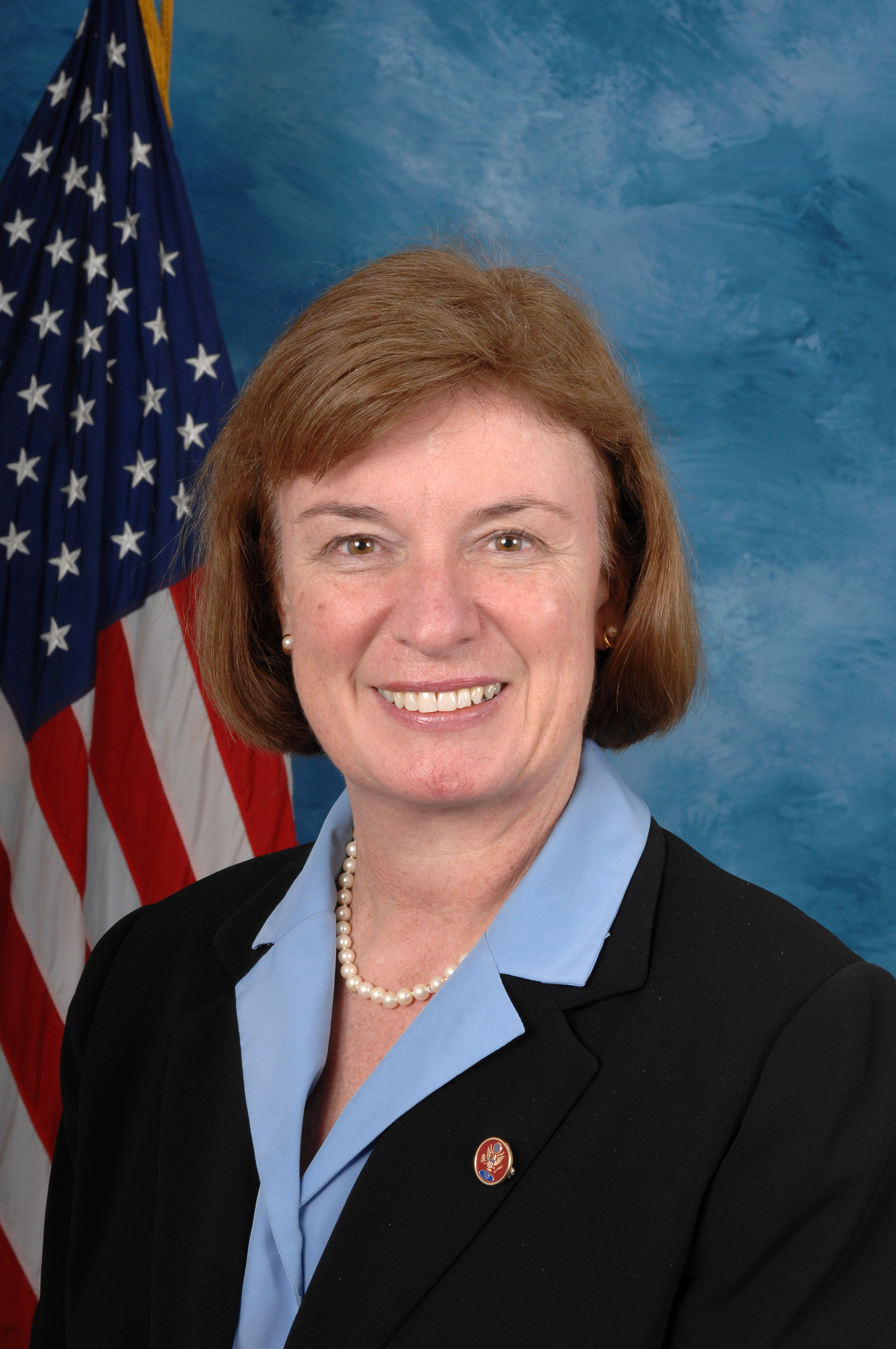

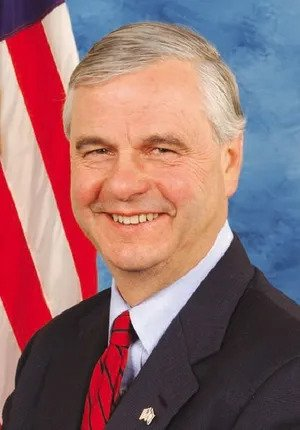
Nominee	Carol Shea-Porter	Jeb Bradley
Party	Democratic	Republican
Popular vote	176,435	156,338
Percentage	51.7%	45.8%
- County results Shea-Porter: 40–50% 50–60% Bradley: 40–50% 50–60%
U.S. Representative before election
Carol Shea-Porter
Democratic
Elected U.S. Representative
Carol Shea-Porter
Democratic

This district covers the southeastern and eastern portions of New Hampshire, consisting of three general areas: Greater Manchester, the Seacoast and the Lakes Region. It includes all of Carroll and Strafford counties, almost all of Rockingham county, a small portion of Hillsborough County, and one town in Merrimack County.

Democratic incumbent Carol Shea-Porter defeated Republican nominee Jeb Bradley and Libertarian Robert Kingsbury. CQ Politics forecasted the race as 'No Clear Favorite'; The Rothenberg Political Report ranked the race as 'Pure Toss-Up'; and The Cook Political Report listed the race as a 'Democratic Toss-Up'.

Shea-Porter squeaked into Congress by a 51% to 49% margin against incumbent Republican Bradley in one of the greatest upsets of the 2006 election cycle. In January 2007, Bradley announced his intent to seek a rematch in 2008. He faced and defeated Former Assistant Attorney General and Department of Health and Human Services commissioner John Stephen in a close Republican primary. Shea-Porter did not face a primary challenge. George W. Bush narrowly won this district with 51% to 49% for John Kerry in 2004 (CPVI=R+0).

=== Republican primary ===
2008 New Hampshire 1st Congressional District Republican primary election
Party	Candidate	Votes	%	±%
Republican	Jeb Bradley	18,559	51.04%	
Republican	John Stephen	16,766	46.11%	
Republican	Geoff Michael	534	1.47%	
Republican	Dave Jarvis	414	1.14%	
Independent	Other	89*	0.24%	
Turnout		36,362	100%	

- This includes 46 votes for incumbent Democratic Congresswoman Carol Shea-Porter.

=== General Election ===
==== Opinion Polling ====
Source	Date	Democrat: Carol Shea-Porter	Republican: Jeb Bradley	Undecided
Concord Monitor/Research 2000	September 22–24, 2008	44%	43%	
WMUR Granite State Poll	September 14–21, 2008	42%	45%	12%
Granite State Poll	July 11–20, 2008	40%	46%	14%
Granite State Poll	April 25–30, 2008	39%	45%	13%

The University of New Hampshire's Granite State Poll conducted in July found that incumbent Representative Carol Shea-Porter had a +3% net favorability rating in the district (35% favorable, 32% unfavorable, 9% neutral, and 24% did not know enough about her) while Former Representative Jeb Bradley had a net favorability rating of +21% (48% favorable, 27% unfavorable, 8% neutral, and 17% did not know enough about him). The majority of Republicans supported Bradley, Democrats supported Shea-Porter, and Independents were leaning toward Bradley (40% to 26%). Shea-Porter led among women (46% to 36%) and Bradley led among men (56% to 34%).

In September, the fall Granite State Poll found that Shea-Porter's net favorability had increased to +13% (44% favorable, 31% unfavorable, 5% neutral, and 20% did not know enough about her), while Bradley's favorability has fallen to +7% (36% favorable, 29% unfavorable, 14% neutral, and 21% did not know enough about him). The majority of Republicans supported Bradley, Democrats supported Shea-Porter, and Independents were leaning toward Bradley (44% to 38%). Shea-Porter continued to lead among women (50% to 39%) and Bradley maintained his lead among men (52% to 32%).

==== Predictions ====
Source	Ranking	As of
The Cook Political Report	Tossup	November 6, 2008
Rothenberg	Tilt D	November 2, 2008
Sabato's Crystal Ball	Lean D	November 6, 2008
Real Clear Politics	Tossup	November 7, 2008
CQ Politics	Tossup	November 6, 2008

==== Results ====
2008 New Hampshire 1st Congressional District General Election
Party	Candidate	Votes	%	±%
Democratic	Carol Shea-Porter (Incumbent)	176,435	51.73%	+0.4%
Republican	Jeb Bradley	156,338	45.84%	−2.76%
Libertarian	Robert Kingsbury	8,100	2.37%	+2.37%
Turnout		341,071	100.00%	
Democratic hold		Swing		

Current Candidate Websites

- Carol Shea-Porter (D) of Strafford - Incumbent (campaign website)
- Jeb Bradley (R) of Wolfeboro (campaign website)
- Bob Kingsbury (L) of Laconia (campaign website)

Former Candidate Websites

- John Stephen (R) of Manchester (campaign website)
- Geoff Michael (R) of Merrimack (campaign website)
- Dave Jarvis (R) of Hooksett (campaign website)
- Peter Bearse (I) of Fremont (campaign website)

== District 2 ==
2008 New Hampshire's 2nd congressional district election
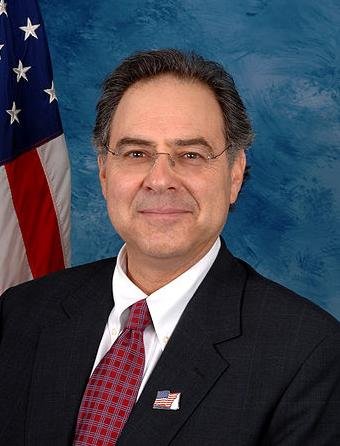

Nominee	Paul Hodes	Jennifer Horn
Party	Democratic	Republican
Popular vote	188,332	138,222
Percentage	56.4%	41.4%
- Municipality results Hodes: 40–50% 50–60% 60–70% 70–80% 80–90% >90% Horn: 40–50% 50–60% 60–70% 70–80% Tie: 40–50% No Votes
U.S. Representative before election
Paul Hodes
Democratic
Elected U.S. Representative
Paul Hodes
Democratic

This district consists of the western and northern portions of the state, including all of Cheshire, Coos, Grafton, and Sullivan counties as well as almost all of Merrimack and Hillsborough counties plus three towns in Rockingham county and two towns in Belknap County.

Democratic incumbent Paul Hodes defeated Republican nominee Jennifer Horn and Libertarian Chester L. Lapointe, II. CQ Politics forecasted the race as 'Democrat Favored'. In 2006, Democrat Hodes upended Republican incumbent Charlie Bass with a 53% to 45% victory. In 2008 Jennifer Horn, a radio talk show host, won the Republican primary against former Congressional Aide Grant Bosse, State Senator Bob Clegg, businessman Jim Steiner and Alfred L'Eplattenier. John Kerry narrowly won the district with 52% of the vote in 2004 (CPVI=D+3).

=== Republican primary ===
2008 New Hampshire 2nd Congressional District Republican primary election
Party	Candidate	Votes	%	±%
Republican	Jennifer Horn	12,667	40.29%	
Republican	Bob Clegg	10,731	34.13%	
Republican	Jim Steiner	4,561	14.51%	
Republican	Grant Bosse	2,944	9.36%	
Republican	Alfred L'Eplattenier	540	1.72%	
Turnout		31,443	100%	

- 97% of precincts reporting (9/10/08).

=== General Election ===
==== Predictions ====
Source	Ranking	As of
The Cook Political Report	Safe D	November 6, 2008
Rothenberg	Safe D	November 2, 2008
Sabato's Crystal Ball	Lean D	November 6, 2008
Real Clear Politics	Safe D	November 7, 2008
CQ Politics	Likely D	November 6, 2008

2008 New Hampshire 2nd Congressional District General Election
Party	Candidate	Votes	%	±%
Democratic	Paul Hodes (incumbent)	188,332	56.4%	+3.4%
Republican	Jennifer Horn	138,222	41.4%	−3.6%
Libertarian	Chester L. Lapointe, II	7,121	2.1%	+0.1%
Turnout		333,675	100.00%	
Democratic hold		Swing		

Current candidates

Paul Hodes (D) - Incumbent (campaign website)
Jennifer Horn (R) (campaign website)
Chester L. Lapointe, II (L) (campaign website)

Former candidates

Grant Bosse (R) (campaign website)
Robert Clegg, Jr. (R) (campaign website)
Jim Steiner (R) (campaign website)
Alfred L'Eplattenier (R) (campaign website)

- Race ranking and details from CQ Politics
- Campaign contributions from OpenSecrets
