= John P. Kacavas =

American lawyer and politician

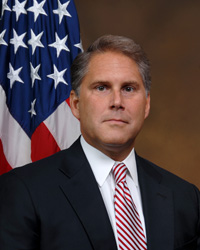

United States Attorney for the District of New Hampshire
- In office August 13, 2009 – April 17, 2015
- President: Barack Obama
- Preceded by: Thomas P. Colantuono
- Succeeded by: Donald Feith (acting)

Member of the New Hampshire House of Representatives from the Hillsborough 37th district
- In office December 6, 2000 – December 4, 2002
- Preceded by: multi-member district
- Succeeded by: multi-member district

Personal details
- Born: John Paul Kacavas; March 27, 1961 (age 65) Manchester, New Hampshire, U.S.
- Party: Democratic
- Spouse: Mindy
- Children: 3
- Education: Saint Michael's College (BA); American University (MA); Boston College (JD)
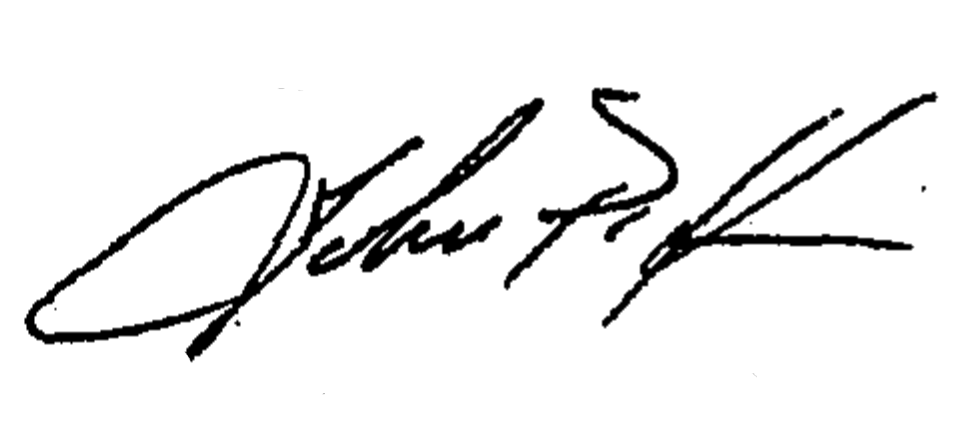
- Signature

John Paul Kacavas (born March 27, 1961) is an American lawyer and former politician who served as the United States Attorney for the District of New Hampshire from 2009 to 2015.

== Early life and education ==
He was born in Manchester, New Hampshire, to Nicholas and Betty Kacavas. His father was a pressman and worked for the Union Leader Corporation as a printer. He graduated from Manchester Central High School. While in high school, he was a starting guard on Central's state championship basketball team . He graduated from Saint Michael's College with a Bachelor of Arts degree in political science in 1983, American University School of International Service with a Master of Arts degree in international affairs in 1987, and Boston College Law School with a Juris Doctor in 1990.

== Legal career ==
From 1990 to 1993 he was in private practice in Manchester. From 1993 to 1999 he served as an assistant attorney general, senior assistant attorney General and chief of the homicide unit within the New Hampshire Attorney General's Office. From 1999 to 2000 he was a trial attorney with the United States Department of Justice Criminal Division. From 2000 to 2009 he was in private practice in Manchester. Since 2015 he has served as chief legal officer and general counsel at Dartmouth Health System.

=== U.S. Attorney ===
In May 2009 he was nominated by President Obama to serve as the United States Attorney for the District of New Hampshire. He was later confirmed by the United States Senate by voice vote on August 8, 2009, and was sworn in on August 13, 2009. He resigned on April 17, 2015.

== Political career ==
He served on the Manchester Board of School Committee. From 2000 to 2002 he served in the New Hampshire House of Representatives as a Democrat representing the 37th district of Hillsborough County, New Hampshire.

== Personal life ==
He and his wife Mindy have three children.
