= Nahum J. Bachelder =

American politician (1854–1934)

Nahum Josiah Bachelder
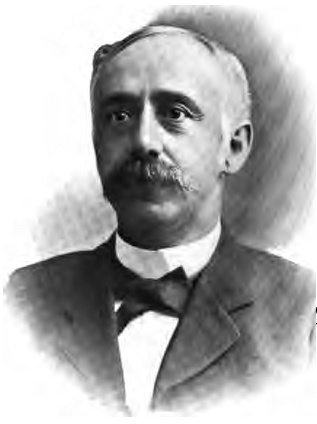

49th Governor of New Hampshire
- In office January 1, 1903 – January 5, 1905
- Preceded by: Chester B. Jordan
- Succeeded by: John McLane

Personal details
- Born: September 3, 1854 East Andover, New Hampshire, U.S.
- Died: April 22, 1934 (aged 79) East Andover, New Hampshire, U.S.
- Party: Republican
- Spouse: Mary A. Putney
- Children: 2

Nahum Josiah Bachelder (September 3, 1854 – April 22, 1934) was the 49th governor of New Hampshire from 1903 to 1905. He was a farmer and Republican politician from East Andover, New Hampshire, United States. Bachelder lived at and operated his family farm throughout his life, was a leader in the Grange, and served a single term as Governor of New Hampshire.

He became politically active when he joined the Grange, a farmers' advocacy group, in 1877. Bachelder became Master of the local Grange for Merrimack County. He was appointed to New Hampshire's State Board of Agriculture, and served from 1887 until 1913, remaining in this post even through his two years as governor.

Bachelder was elected as the Master of the State Grange in 1891 and held the post until he resigned to become governor in 1903. After his term as Governor of New Hampshire, he served as the Master of the National Grange. He died on his farm in East Andover in 1934 and is buried in the Proctor Cemetery in Andover.

== Biography ==
Bachelder was an eighth-generation descendant of the Rev. Stephen Bachiler, who settled at Hampton, New Hampshire in 1632. Nahum was the oldest child of William A. and Adeline (Shaw) Bachelder. His boyhood was passed upon the family farm in East Andover, and his early education was at Franklin Academy and the New Hampton Institute.

After a brief experience in teaching, Bachelder devoted himself to practical agriculture, gaining success as a market gardener and dairyman. In 1877 he joined Highland Grange at East Andover and later became its Master. In 1883 he was chosen secretary of the state Grange and filled that position for eight years, being then promoted to the office of Master.

Bachelder served for two terms as a member of the executive committee of the National Grange and was also a national lecturer and served on the legislative committee.

In 1887 Bachelder was elected as successor to James O. Adams as Secretary of the State Board of Agriculture. He was also responsible for the office of Commissioner of Immigration, which was established in 1889 and later merged into the State Board of Agriculture. He was an official of the state Cattle Commission since its organization, the work of which included keeping the livestock of the state free from contagious diseases. He was secretary of the Grange State Fair at Tilton and, later, of the state fair at Concord.

Bachelder assisted Governor Frank W. Rollins in the establishment of Old Home Weeks in New Hampshire.

Bachelder received the honorary degree of Master of Arts from Dartmouth College in 1891. He was a member of the University and Wonolancet clubs of Concord, the Derryfield Club of Manchester, and of the Kearsarge lodge, A. F. and A. M. He attended the Congregational Church.

He was married on June 30, 1887, to Mary A. Putney of Dunbarton. They had two children, Ruth, born May 22, 1891, and Henry, born March 17, 1895. In addition to their farm estate at East Andover they maintained a winter home in the city of Concord.

He was the author of Gems of the Granite State, a souvenir picture book of the summer resorts in New Hampshire.

Party political offices
Preceded by Chester B. Jordan	Republican nominee for Governor of New Hampshire; 1902	Succeeded by John McLane
Political offices
Preceded by Chester B. Jordan	Governor of New Hampshire; 1903–1905	Succeeded by John McLane
