= John Kimball (politician, born 1821) =

American engineer and politician

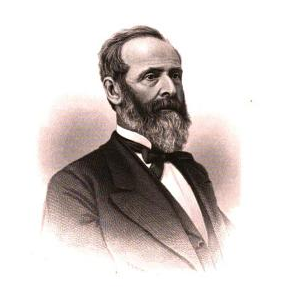

President of the New Hampshire Senate
- In office June 1881 – 1883
- Preceded by: Jacob H. Gallinger
- Succeeded by: Charles H. Bartlett

Member of the New Hampshire Senate District 10
- In office 1881–1883

Mayor of Concord, New Hampshire
- In office 1872–1875
- Preceded by: Abraham G. Jones
- Succeeded by: George A. Pillsbury

Delegate to the New Hampshire Constitutional Convention Representing Ward 5 of Concord, New Hampshire
- In office 1876–1876

President of the Concord, New Hampshire Common Council
- In office 1857–1857

Member of the Concord, New Hampshire Common Council
- In office 1856–1857

Personal details
- Born: April 13, 1821 Canterbury, New Hampshire
- Died: June 1, 1913 (aged 92) Concord, New Hampshire
- Party: Republican
- Spouse(s): Maria H. Phillips; m. May 27, 1846, died December 22, 1894; Charlotte Atkinson m. October 15, 1895.
- Children: Clara Maria Kimball
- Profession: Engineer

John Kimball (April 13, 1821 – June 1, 1913) was an American engineer and politician who served as the mayor of Concord, New Hampshire and as the President of the New Hampshire Senate.

== Early life ==
Kimball was born in Canterbury, New Hampshire to Benjamin and Ruth (Ames) Kimball on April 13, 1821. As a young child he moved with his family to Boscawen, New Hampshire where he was educated in the local public schools. Kimball then went to Concord Academy in Concord, New Hampshire for one year, after which he went to work as an apprentice for one of his relatives where he learned how to construct mills and machinery.

== Family life ==
On May 27, 1846, Kimball married Maria H. Phillips of Rupert, Vermont. They had one child, a daughter Clara Maria Kimball. Maria Kimball died on December 22, 1894, and Kimball married Charlotte Atkinson on October 15, 1895.

== Concord City Council ==
In 1856 Kimball was elected to the Common Council of Concord, New Hampshire. He was reelected and chosen President of that body the next year.

== State House of Representatives ==
In 1857 Kimball was elected to the New Hampshire House of Representatives, and he was reelected in 1859. In his second year in the legislature, Kimball served as the Chair on the committee on state prison.

== Mayor of Concord ==
Kimball was elected the Mayor of Concord, New Hampshire in 1872, and reelected in each of the next three years.

== State Senate ==
In November 1880 Kimball was elected to the New Hampshire Senate from District Number Ten, and when the legislature was organized he was chosen as President of the New Hampshire Senate.

== Death ==
Kimball died on June 1, 1912 at his home in Concord, New Hampshire.

== Notes ==
Political offices
Preceded by Jacob H. Gallinger	President of the New Hampshire Senate; 1881–1883	Succeeded by Charles H. Bartlett
Preceded by Abraham G. Jones	Mayor of Concord, New Hampshire; 1872–1875	Succeeded by George A. Pillsbury
Business positions
Preceded by Nathaniel White	President of the Concord Gas Light Company; 1880–	Succeeded by
