= Henry F. Hollis =

American politician

Henry French Hollis
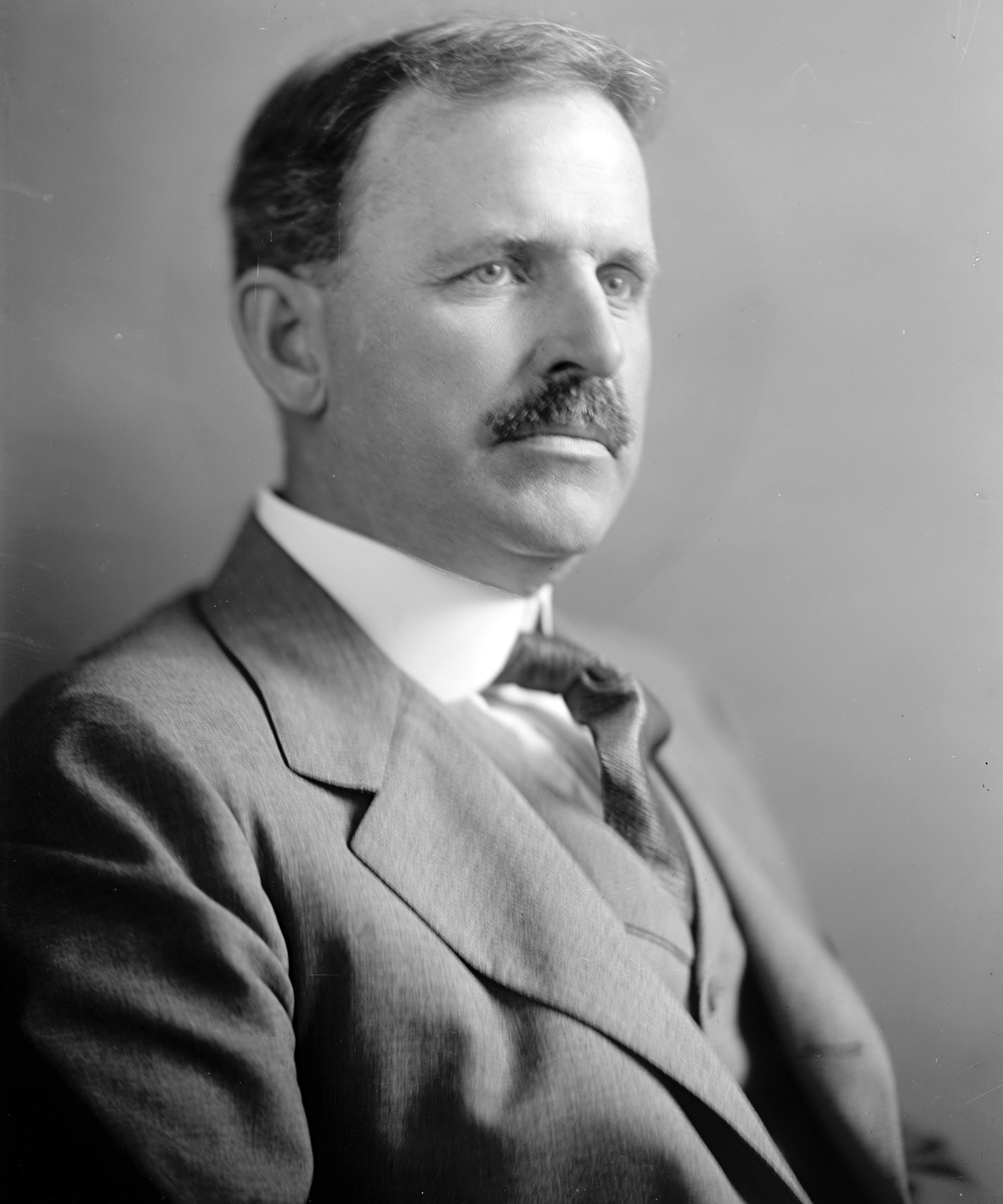

United States Senator from New Hampshire
- In office March 13, 1913 – March 3, 1919
- Preceded by: Henry E. Burnham
- Succeeded by: Henry W. Keyes

Personal details
- Born: August 30, 1869 Concord, New Hampshire, U.S.
- Died: July 7, 1949 (aged 79) Paris, France
- Party: Democratic
- Education: Harvard University (BA)

Henry French Hollis (August 30, 1869 – July 7, 1949) was a United States senator from New Hampshire, and regent of the Smithsonian Institution.

== Life ==
He attended public schools and studied under private tutors. He engaged in civil engineering for the Chicago, Burlington & Quincy Railroad in 1886 and 1887, and graduated from Harvard University in 1892. He studied law, was admitted to the bar in 1893 and commenced practice in Concord.

Hollis was an unsuccessful candidate for Congressional election in 1900 and an unsuccessful Democratic candidate for Governor of New Hampshire in 1902 and 1904. He was elected to the U.S. Senate for the term beginning March 4, 1913, and served from March 13, 1913, until March 3, 1919; he declined to be a candidate for renomination in 1918. While in the Senate he was chairman of the Committee on Enrolled Bills.

From 1914 to 1919, Hollis was a regent of the Smithsonian Institution, and in 1918 was United States representative to the Interallied War Finance Council. He was a member of the United States Liquidation Commission for France and England in 1919 and commenced the practice of international law that year. He was appointed to the International Bank of Bulgaria in 1922.

Hollis was the nephew of sculptor Daniel Chester French.

Hollis was interred in Blossom Hill Cemetery, Concord.

Party political offices
Preceded by Frederick E. Potter	Democratic nominee for Governor of New Hampshire; 1902, 1904	Succeeded by Nathan C. Jameson
U.S. Senate
Preceded by Henry E. Burnham	U.S. senator (Class 2) from New Hampshire; 1913–1919; Served alongside: Jacob H. Gallinger, George H. Moses	Succeeded by Henry W. Keyes
