= Joseph Delahunty =

American politician

Personal details
- Died: January 16, 2024 (aged 88)

Joseph L. Delahunty was an American politician from the Republican Party of New Hampshire. Delahunty served in the New Hampshire House of Representatives and the New Hampshire Senate, where he was president.
