= Charles W. Hoitt =

American politician (1847–1925)

Hon. Charles W. Hoitt

28th United States Attorney for the District of New Hampshire
- In office 1907–1914
- Appointed by: Theodore Roosevelt
- Preceded by: Charles J. Hamblett
- Succeeded by: Fred H. Brown

President of the New Hampshire Senate
- In office January 7, 1903 – April 2, 1903

Member of the New Hampshire Senate District 19
- In office 1903–1903

Member of the New Hampshire House of Representatives
- In office 1901–1901

Judge in the Municipal Court
- In office 1889–1907

Personal details
- Born: October 21, 1847 Newmarket, New Hampshire
- Died: April 2, 1925 (aged 77) Scituate, Massachusetts
- Education: Dartmouth College, 1871

Charles W. Hoitt (October 21, 1847 – April 2, 1925) was an American lawyer and politician from Nashua, New Hampshire who served in both houses of the New Hampshire legislature, as President of the New Hampshire Senate and as the United States Attorney for the District of New Hampshire.

Hoitt was born in Newmarket, New Hampshire on October 21, 1847

In 1871 Hoitt graduated from Dartmouth College.

Hoitt married Harriet Louisa Gilman daughter of Virgil C. Gilman.

Hoitt was admitted to the New Hampshire Bar, and practiced law in Nashua, New Hampshire.

Hoitt served in the New Hampshire House of Representatives in 1901.

Hoitt served as a judge in the Municipal Court from 1889 to 1907.

On February 11, 1907 Hoitt was appointed by Theodore Roosevelt to be the United States Attorney for the District of New Hampshire.

== Notes ==
Legal offices
Preceded by Charles J. Hamblett	28th United States Attorney for the District of New Hampshire; 1907–1914	Succeeded by Fred H. Brown
Political offices
Preceded by Bertram Ellis	President of the New Hampshire Senate; January 7, 1903 – April 2, 1903	Succeeded by George H. Adams
