= George H. Adams =

American politician and lawyer

George Herbert Adams

President of the New Hampshire Senate
- In office January 4, 1905 – 1907
- Preceded by: Charles W. Hoitt
- Succeeded by: John Scammon

Member of the New Hampshire Senate
- In office 1905–1907

Member of the New Hampshire Senate
- In office 1889–1889

Solicitor of Grafton County, New Hampshire
- In office April 1, 1895 – 1899

Member of the New Hampshire House of Representatives

Personal details
- Born: May 18, 1851 Campton, New Hampshire, U.S.
- Died: November 18, 1911 (aged 60) Plymouth, New Hampshire, U.S.
- Resting place: Trinity Cemetery, Holderness, New Hampshire
- Party: Republican
- Spouse: Sarah Katherine Smith (m. 1877)
- Children: 2

George Herbert Adams (May 18, 1851 – November 18, 1911) was an American Republican politician and lawyer who served as the President of the New Hampshire Senate.

Adams was born in Campton, New Hampshire, May 18, 1851, the only child of Isaac L. and Louisa C. (Blair) Adams.

After he graduated from Dartmouth College in 1873, Adams spent a year as the principal of the high school of Marlborough, Massachusetts. In January 1874, Adams entered the law office of Henry W. Blair in Plymouth, New Hampshire to study the law. Adams studied law until he was admitted to the Bar, during the September 1876 term of the New Hampshire Supreme Court at Grafton County, New Hampshire.

On January 14, 1877, Adams married Sarah Katherine Smith of Meredith, New Hampshire. They had two children, Walter Blair Adams born December 13, 1887, and George Herbert Adams, Jr., born April 12, 1890.

Adams was a delegate from Campton at the 1876 New Hampshire Constitutional Convention, and he was to elected to represent Plymouth in the New Hampshire House of Representatives in 1883, and to the New Hampshire Senate in 1889 and 1905, and in 1905 he was chosen the President of the New Hampshire Senate. Adams was twice elected the Solicitor of Grafton County, New Hampshire, serving for four years starting April 1, 1895.

Adams died in Plymouth, New Hampshire on November 18, 1911, aged 60. He is buried in Trinity Cemetery, Holderness, New Hampshire.

== Notes ==
Political offices
Preceded by Charles W. Hoitt	President of the New Hampshire Senate; January 4, 1905 – January 2, 1907	Succeeded by John Scammon
