= Gary Francoeur =

American politician

Majority Leader of the New Hampshire Senate
- In office December 6, 2000 – December 4, 2002
- Preceded by: Burton J. Cohen
- Succeeded by: Robert Clegg Jr.

Member of the New Hampshire Senate from the 14th district
- In office December 4, 1996 – December 4, 2002
- Preceded by: Thomas P. Colantuono
- Succeeded by: Robert Clegg Jr.

Member of the New Hampshire House of Representatives from the 23rd Hillsborough district
- In office December 7, 1994 – December 4, 1996
- Preceded by: Multi-member district
- Succeeded by: Multi-member district

Personal details
- Born: June 14, 1957 (age 69) Nashua, New Hampshire
- Party: Republican

Gary R. Francoeur (born June 14, 1957) is an American politician.

== Early life ==
On June 14, 1957, Francoeur was born in Nashua, New Hampshire.

== Education ==
In 1979, Francoeur earned a bachelor of science degree from the University of New Hampshire.

== Career ==
Francoeur served in the New Hampshire House of Representatives from 1994 to 1996 and in the New Hampshire Senate from the 14th district from 1996 to 2002. He also served as Majority Leader of the New Hampshire Senate.

== Personal life ==
Francoeur's first wife is Beatrice. They have five children. Krystal, Amanda, Jeffrey, Jenna, and Rebecca
