= 1894 New Hampshire gubernatorial election =

- November 6, 1894
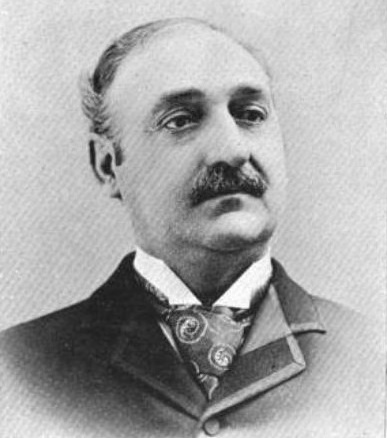

Nominee	Charles A. Busiel	Henry O. Kent
Party	Republican	Democratic
Popular vote	46,491	33,959
Percentage	55.98%	40.89%
- Busiel: 40-50% 50–60% 60–70% 70–80% 80–90% >90% Kent: 40-50% 50–60% 60–70% 70–80% 80–90% Tie: 40-50% 50%

The 1894 New Hampshire gubernatorial election was held on November 6, 1894. Republican nominee Charles A. Busiel defeated Democratic nominee Henry O. Kent with 55.98% of the vote.

== General election ==
=== Candidates ===
Major party candidates

- Charles A. Busiel, Republican
- Henry O. Kent, Democratic

Other candidates

- Daniel C. Knowles, Prohibition
- George D. Epps, People's

=== Results ===
1894 New Hampshire gubernatorial election
Party	Candidate	Votes	%	±%
Republican	Charles A. Busiel	46,491	55.98%	
Democratic	Henry O. Kent	33,959	40.89%	
Prohibition	Daniel C. Knowles	1,750	2.11%	
Populist	George D. Epps	832	1.00%	
Majority		12,532		
Turnout				
Republican hold		Swing		
