= New Hampshire's 14th State Senate district =

American legislative district

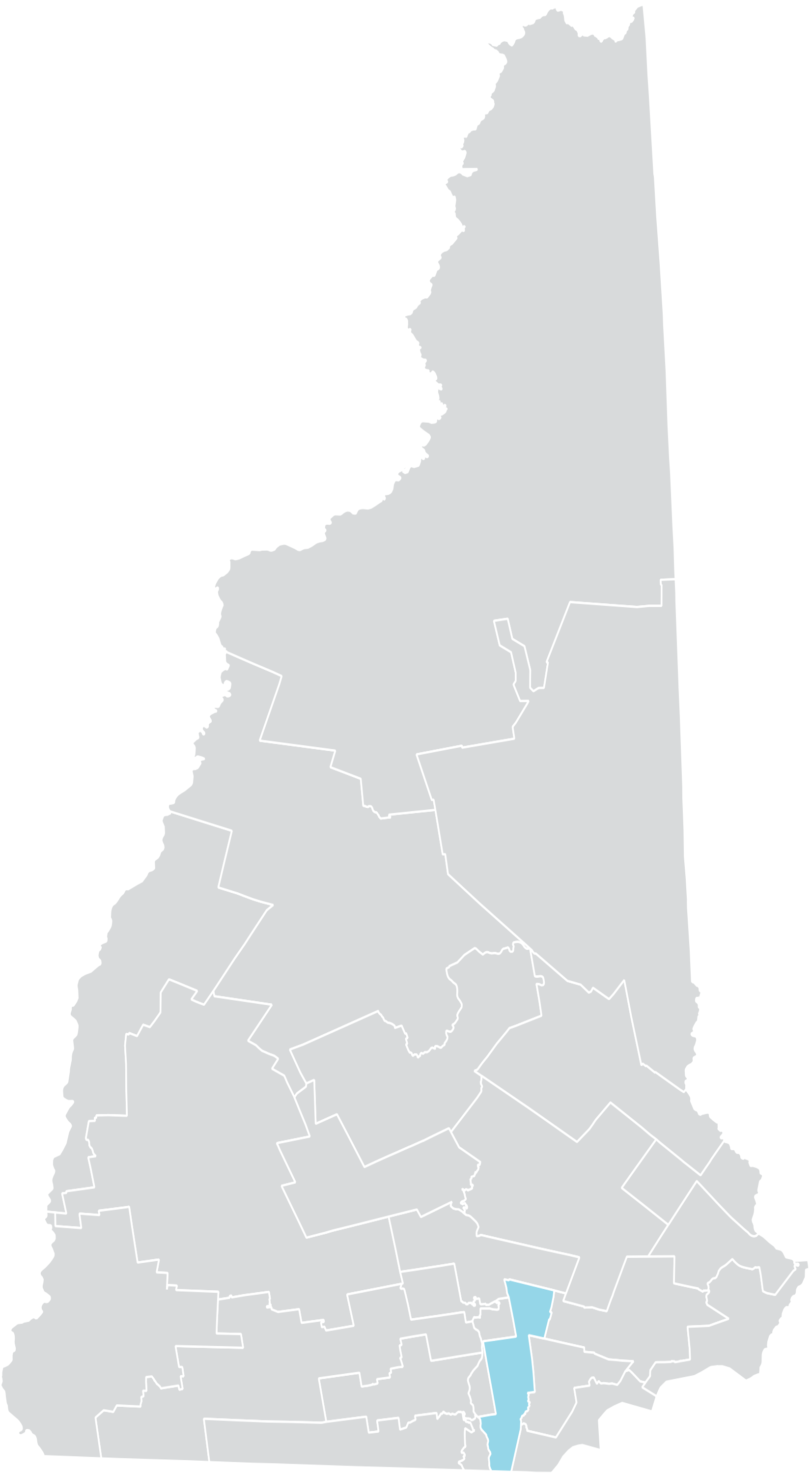
Senator
Sharon Carson; R–Londonderry
- Registration: 36.7% Republican; 28.7% Democratic; 34.5% No party preference
- Demographics: 93.2% White; 0.7% Black; 2.7% Hispanic; 2.0% Asian
- Population (2019) • Citizens of voting age: 56,729; 43,025

New Hampshire's 14th State Senate district is one of 24 districts in the New Hampshire Senate. It has been represented by Republican Sharon Carson since 2008.

== Senators ==
- Rhona Charbonneau (1984–1990)
- Thomas P. Colantuono (1990–1996)
- Gary Francoeur (1996–2002)
- Robert Clegg Jr. (2002–2008)
- Sharon Carson (since 2008)

== Geography ==
District 14 covers the towns of Auburn, Hudson, and Londonderry in Hillsborough and Rockingham Counties.

The district is split evenly between New Hampshire's 1st congressional district and New Hampshire's 2nd congressional district. It borders the state of Massachusetts.

== Recent election results ==
=== 2024 ===
2024 New Hampshire State Senate election, District 14
Party	Candidate	Votes	%
Republican	Sharon Carson (Incumbent)	19,429	58.76
Democratic	Kara Roy	13,611	41.17
Write-in		24	0.07
Total votes		33,064	100.0
Republican hold			

=== 2022 ===
2022 New Hampshire State Senate election, District 14
Party	Candidate	Votes	%
Republican	Sharon Carson (incumbent)	14,631	59.1
Democratic	John Robinson	10,133	40.9
Total votes		24,776	100.0

=== 2020 ===
2020 New Hampshire State Senate election, District 14
Party	Candidate	Votes	%
Republican	Sharon Carson (incumbent)	19,082	58.9
Democratic	Nancy Hendricks	13,330	41.1
Total votes		32,412	100
Republican hold			

=== 2018 ===
2018 New Hampshire State Senate election, District 14
Party	Candidate	Votes	%
Republican	Sharon Carson (incumbent)	12,823	57.6
Democratic	Tammy Siekmann	9,424	42.4
Total votes		22,247	100
Republican hold			

=== 2016 ===
2016 New Hampshire State Senate election, District 14
Primary election
Party	Candidate	Votes	%
Republican	Sharon Carson (incumbent)	3,139	72.3
Republican	Ludwig Haken	1,204	27.7
Total votes		4,343	100
General election
Republican	Sharon Carson (incumbent)	17,793	64.1
Democratic	Richard Leonard	9,989	35.9
Total votes		27,782	100
Republican hold			

=== 2014 ===
2014 New Hampshire State Senate election, District 14
Party	Candidate	Votes	%
Republican	Sharon Carson (incumbent)	11,742	63.7
Democratic	Kate Messner	6,689	36.3
Total votes		18,431	100
Republican hold			

=== 2012 ===
2012 New Hampshire State Senate election, District 14
Party	Candidate	Votes	%
Republican	Sharon Carson (incumbent)	13,701	53.5
Democratic	Kate Messner	10,466	40.8
Libertarian	Richard Kahn	1,466	5.7
Total votes		25,633	100
Republican hold			

=== Federal and statewide results ===
Year	Office	Results
2020	President	Trump 52.1 – 46.5%
2020	Senate	Shaheen 50.4 – 47.4%
2016	President	Trump 54.0 – 40.9%
2014	Senate	Brown 58.3 – 41.7%
2014	Governor	Havenstein 56.7 – 43.3%
2012	President	Romney 55.8 – 43.1%
2012	Governor	Lamontagne 50.0 – 47.1%
