= Robert Clegg Jr. =

American politician (1954–2023)

Bob Clegg

Member of the New Hampshire Senate from the 14th district
- In office December 4, 2002 – December 3, 2008
- Preceded by: Gary Francoeur
- Succeeded by: Sharon Carson

Personal details
- Born: April 27, 1954 Lowell, Massachusetts, U.S.
- Died: August 31, 2023 (aged 69)
- Party: Republican
- Spouse: Priscilla
- Profession: property management

Robert E. Clegg Jr. (April 27, 1954 – August 31, 2023) was an American politician, a Republican state senator from New Hampshire's 14th district, and who ran unsuccessfully for Congress in New Hampshire's 2nd congressional district in 2008.

== State legislator ==
Clegg was a member of the New Hampshire House of Representatives, where he served for four terms. He served in several leadership positions including Speaker Pro Tempore, Assistant Majority Leader and Majority Caucus Whip. He has been named Legislator of the Year by the National Republican Legislators Association, and by the Home Builders & Remodelers Association of New Hampshire. He is a past recipient of the Outstanding Legislator Award presented by Grange #327, the New Hampshire Fire Standards and Training Commission's Fire Academy Award, and the New Hampshire Health Care Association's Government Leadership Award.

The senator was a member of the Judiciary Committee, the Transportation and Interstate Cooperation Committee, and the Capital Budget Committee. He also was a member of the Capital Budget Overview Committee, Strategic Capital Plan Committee, Emergency Management System Joint Legislative Oversight Committee, Hazardous Material Transportation Advisory Board and the Telecommunications Oversight Committee. He also served as the Senate Majority Leader.

Clegg was active in the local community, contributing his time and talents to various organizations and causes. He served in many civic capacities in his hometown of Hudson, including as a town councilor, selectman, member of the Budget Committee, Building Board of Appeals, Economic Development Committee, and Charter Study Committee. He was also active in the Hudson Chamber of Commerce and was recognized as its Citizen of the Year. He was recognized by Hudson Post #48 for his work on behalf of veterans. He was a justice of the peace.

Clegg was a member of the United States Police Canine Association (USPCA) and a board member of the USPCA Foundation. He was past President of the Hudson Taxpayers Association, Chairman of the State Building Code Review Board and a member of the Hudson Masons.

== 2008 election ==
In 2008, Clegg gave up his Senate seat to run for the U.S. House of Representatives in New Hampshire's 2nd congressional district, but lost the Republican primary to talk radio host Jennifer Horn who in turn lost to incumbent Paul Hodes.

== 2010 election ==
In 2010, Clegg joined with Republican U.S. Senate candidate Bill Binnie to take on GOP front-runner Kelly Ayotte in a TV attack ad.

== Lobbying ==
Clegg was a lobbyist for Legislative Solutions in Concord, NH.

== Personal life and death ==
Clegg and his wife, Priscilla, resided in Hudson, New Hampshire, and had two children. He died on August 31, 2023, at the age of 69.
