= Charles H. Bartlett =

American lawyer and politician (1833–1900)

Honorable Charles H. Bartlett
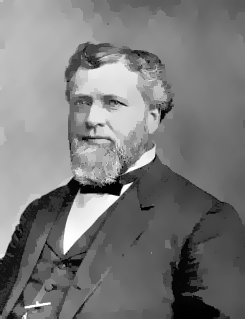

President of the New Hampshire Senate
- In office 1883–1885
- Preceded by: John Kimball
- Succeeded by: Chester Pike

Member of the New Hampshire Senate

20th Mayor of Manchester, New Hampshire
- In office 1872 – February 1873
- Preceded by: Person Colby Cheney
- Succeeded by: John P. Newell

Personal details
- Born: Charles Henry Bartlett; October 15, 1833 Sunapee, New Hampshire
- Died: January 25, 1900 (aged 66) Manchester, New Hampshire
- Spouse: Hannah M. Eastmen (1858–1890)
- Children: Clara Bell Bartlett, Charles Leslie Bartlett

Charles Henry Bartlett (October 15, 1833 – January 25, 1900) was an American lawyer and politician who served as Mayor of Manchester, New Hampshire, and as a member and President of the New Hampshire Senate.

Bartlett was born in Sunapee, New Hampshire, on October 15, 1833.

Bartlett married Hannah M. Eastmen of Croydon, New Hampshire, on December 8, 1858. Hannah Bartlett died on July 25, 1890. They had two children, a daughter, Clara Bell Bartlett, and a son, Charles Leslie Bartlett.

In June 1857, Bartlett was appointed clerk of the United States District Court for the District of New Hampshire.

Bartlett was elected mayor of Manchester, New Hampshire, in 1872. He resigned in February 1873 because of a federal government policy that barred officers from holding state or municipal offices.

Bartlett died in Manchester on January 25, 1900.

Political offices
Preceded by Person Colby Cheney	Mayor of Manchester, New Hampshire; 1872 – February 1873	Succeeded by John P. Newell
Preceded by John Kimball	President of the New Hampshire Senate; 1883–1885	Succeeded by Chester Pike
