= 1900 New Hampshire gubernatorial election =

- November 6, 1900
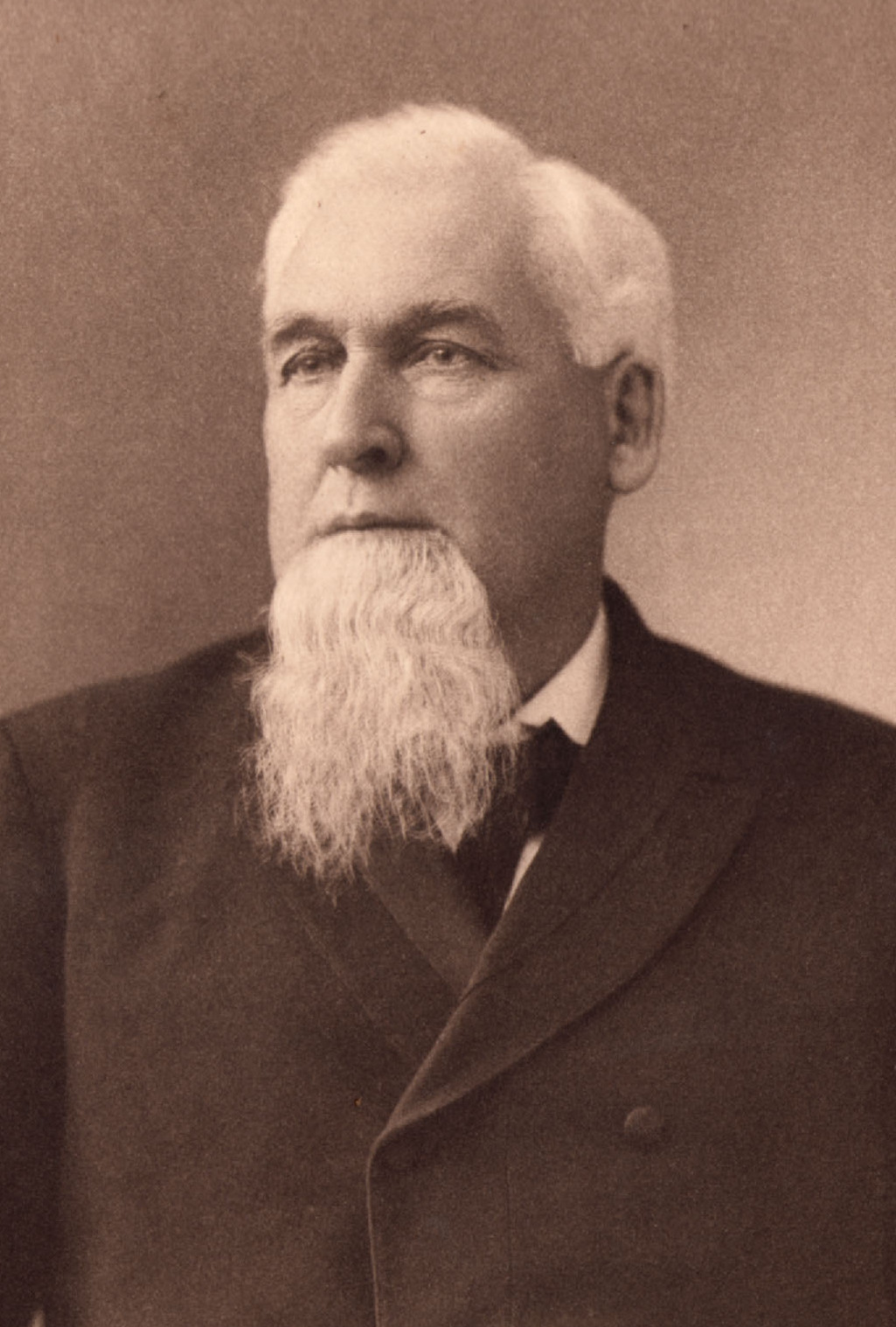

Nominee	Chester B. Jordan	Frederick E. Potter
Party	Republican	Democratic
Popular vote	53,891	34,956
Percentage	59.36%	38.50%
- Jordan: 40-50% 50–60% 60–70% 70–80% 80–90% >90% Potter: 50–60% 60–70% 70–80% >90% Tie: 40-50%
Governor before election
Frank W. Rollins
Republican
Elected Governor
Chester B. Jordan
Republican

The 1900 New Hampshire gubernatorial election was held on November 6, 1900. Republican nominee Chester B. Jordan defeated Democratic nominee Frederick E. Potter with 59.36% of the vote.

== General election ==
=== Candidates ===
Major party candidates

- Chester B. Jordan, Republican
- Frederick E. Potter, Democratic

Other candidates

- Josiah M. Fletcher, Prohibition
- Sumner F. Claflin, Social Democratic

=== Results ===
1900 New Hampshire gubernatorial election
Party	Candidate	Votes	%	±%
Republican	Chester B. Jordan	53,891	59.36%	
Democratic	Frederick E. Potter	34,956	38.50%	
Prohibition	Josiah M. Fletcher	1,182	1.30%	
Social Democratic	Sumner F. Claflin	757	0.83%	
Majority		18,935		
Turnout				
Republican hold		Swing		
