= Bertram Ellis =

American lawyer and politician

Hon. Bertram Ellis
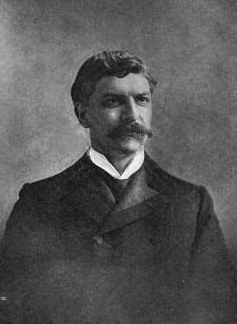

President of the New Hampshire Senate
- In office 1901–1903
- Preceded by: Thomas N. Hastings
- Succeeded by: Charles W. Hoitt

Member of the New Hampshire Senate District No. 13
- In office January 4, 1899 – 1903
- Majority: 631 (1898)

Speaker of the New Hampshire House of Representatives.
- In office January 2, 1907 – 1909
- Preceded by: Rufus N. Elwell
- Succeeded by: Walter W. Scott

Member of the New Hampshire House of Representatives
- In office January 1907 – 1909

Member of the New Hampshire House of Representatives Representing Ward 4 Keene, New Hampshire
- In office 1897–1897

Personal details
- Born: November 20, 1860 Boston, Massachusetts
- Died: January 4, 1920 (aged 59) Keene, New Hampshire
- Spouse(s): Margret Louis Wheeler, m. June 20, 1894
- Education: Harvard College, 1884, Harvard Law School, 1887

Bertram Ellis (November 20, 1860 – January 4, 1920) was an American lawyer and politician who served as a member and President of the New Hampshire Senate, and as a member and Speaker of the New Hampshire House of Representatives.

Ellis was born to Moses and Emily (Ferrin) Ellis in Boston, Massachusetts, on November 20, 1860.

Ellis graduated from Harvard College in 1884, and Harvard Law School in 1887.

After he graduated from Harvard Law School, Ellis moved to New York and went to work for the law firm of Evarts, Choate and Beaman. He was admitted to the New York Bar in 1888, but he soon moved to Denver, Colorado, and practiced law there for two years until 1890, when he moved back to New Hampshire after his father fell ill. and died.

In 1893 Ellis went to work as an editor of the Keene Evening Sentinel and the weekly New Hampshire Weekly Sentinel. Ellis continued to be the editor of the Sentinel until two years before his death.

On June 20, 1894 Ellis married Margret Louis Wheeler of Minneapolis, Minnesota.

In 1897 Ellis was elected to represent Ward Four of Keene, New Hampshire in the New Hampshire House of Representatives.

Ellis was elected to the New Hampshire Senate from District 12, with a majority of 631 votes.

On January 2, 1907, Ellis was chosen as the Speaker of the New Hampshire House of Representatives.

In 1910 Ellis ran for the Republican nomination for Governor of New Hampshire. In the first primary election ever held in the state, Ellis lost the primary to Robert P. Bass, who would go on to become governor.

Ellis died in Keene, New Hampshire on January 4, 1920.

== Notes ==
Political offices
Preceded by Thomas N. Hastings	President of the New Hampshire Senate; 1901–1903	Succeeded by Charles W. Hoitt
Preceded by Rufus N. Elwell	Speaker of the New Hampshire House of Representatives; January 2, 1907 – 1909	Succeeded by Walter W. Scott
