= Arthur P. Morrill =

American politician from New Hampshire

Speaker of the New Hampshire House of Representatives
- In office 1915–1919
- Preceded by: Edwin C. Bean
- Succeeded by: Charles W. Tobey

President of the New Hampshire Senate
- In office 1919–1921
- Preceded by: Jesse M. Barton
- Succeeded by: Leslie Perkins Snow

Personal details
- Born: March 15, 1876 Concord, New Hampshire
- Died: June 3, 1935 (aged 59) Concord, New Hampshire
- Party: Republican
- Education: Yale College (BA); Harvard Law School (LLB)

Arthur P. Morrill (March 15, 1876 – June 3, 1935) was an American politician who served as Speaker of the New Hampshire House of Representatives from 1915 and President of the New Hampshire Senate from 1919 to 1921.
