= Sharon Carson =

American politician (born 1957)

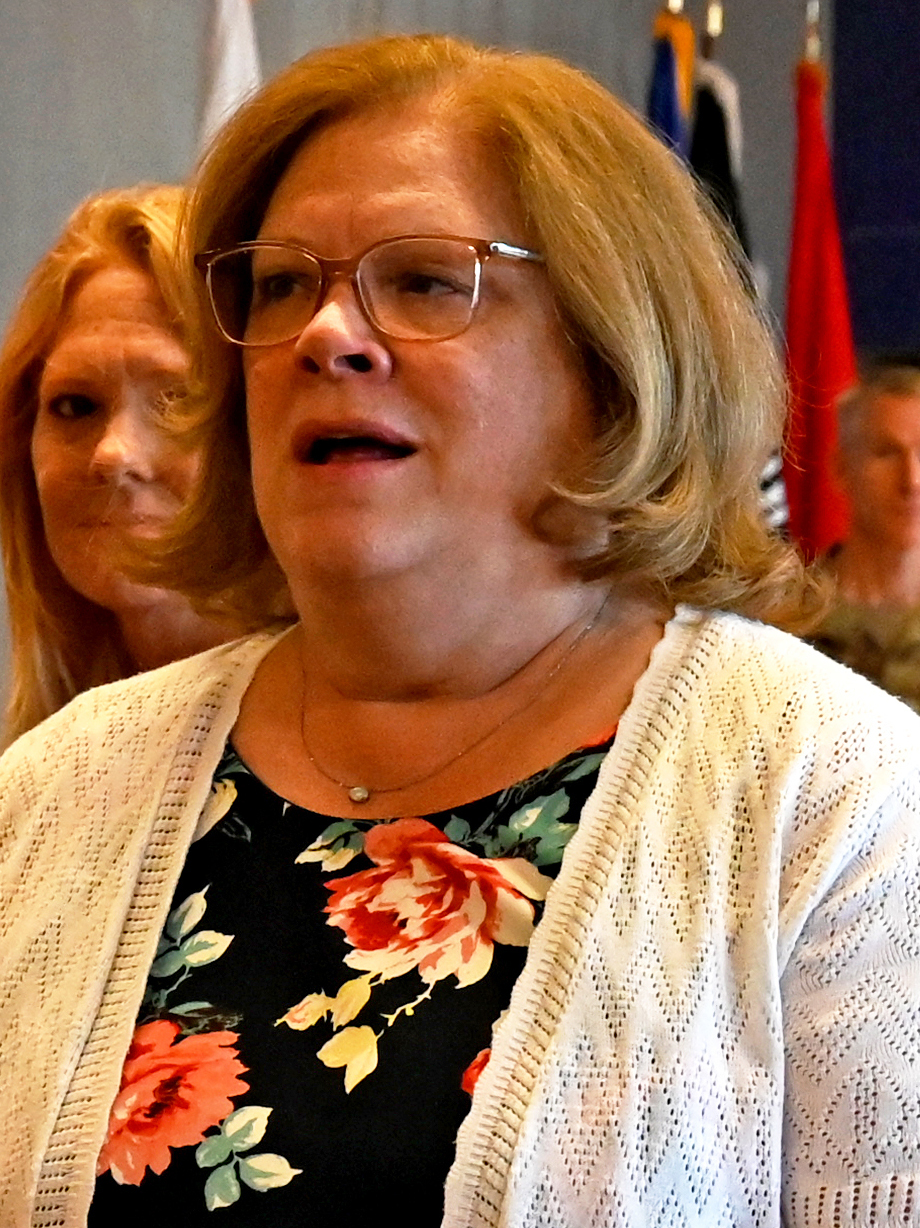

President of the New Hampshire Senate
- Incumbent
- Assumed office December 4, 2024
- Preceded by: Jeb Bradley

Majority Leader of the New Hampshire Senate
- In office December 7, 2022 – December 4, 2024
- Preceded by: Jeb Bradley
- Succeeded by: Regina Birdsell

President pro tempore of the New Hampshire Senate
- In office December 4, 2020 – December 7, 2022
- Preceded by: Martha Fuller Clark
- Succeeded by: Jim Gray
- In office December 5, 2014 – December 5, 2018
- Preceded by: Bob Odell
- Succeeded by: Martha Fuller Clark

Member of the New Hampshire Senate from the 14th district
- Incumbent
- Assumed office December 3, 2008
- Preceded by: Robert Clegg Jr.

Member of the New Hampshire House of Representatives from the Rockingham's 3rd district
- In office December 6, 2000 – December 3, 2008
- Preceded by: Multi-member district
- Succeeded by: Multi-member district

Personal details
- Born: November 11, 1957 (age 68) Limestone, Maine, U.S.
- Party: Republican
- Education: Mount Wachusett Community College (attended); University of New Hampshire, Durham (BA, MA)
- Website: Official website

Sharon Carson (born November 11, 1957) is an American politician who has served in the New Hampshire Senate from the 14th district since 2008. She served in the New Hampshire House of Representatives from Rockingham's 3rd district from 2000 to 2008.

She also serves as a professor at Nashua Community College for American Government and Politics.

Following the 2024 New Hampshire Senate elections, Carson was unanimously elected to serve as President of the New Hampshire Senate.

New Hampshire Senate
Preceded by Bob Odell	President pro tempore of the New Hampshire Senate; 2014–2018	Succeeded by Martha Fuller Clark
Preceded by Martha Fuller Clark	President pro tempore of the New Hampshire Senate; 2020–2022	Succeeded by Jim Gray
Preceded by Jeb Bradley	Majority Leader of the New Hampshire Senate; 2022–2024	Succeeded by Regina Birdsell
Political offices
Preceded by Jeb Bradley	President of the New Hampshire Senate; 2024–present	Incumbent
