= Prop comedy =

Comedy genre

Prop comedy is a comedy genre in which performers use humorous objects, or conventional objects in humorous ways. The stages and films term "prop", an abbreviation of "property", refers to any object an actor handles in the course of a performance. Though some form of prop comedy has likely existed as long as there have been comedians, the genre reached its zenith in the vaudeville era. The vaudeville team Olsen and Johnson used prop comedy extensively in their long running Broadway revue Hellzapoppin.

A prop comic is a comedian who uses prop comedy. Prop comics are sometimes looked down upon by other comedians, and the term is sometimes used derisively. However, some, such as Tommy Cooper, rose to critical acclaim as their props revolved around a gimmick (such as Cooper's magic) and the comedian's character around that gimmick.

== Types of props ==
Props are any items that the comedian or comic uses in an absurd way. These can be hand props, such as a book or slapstick, costume props (such as tearaway pants), and set props (such as a breakaway chair). Another example is the rubber chicken.

== Other occurrences ==
The TV comedy game show Whose Line Is It Anyway? has a round called Props in which two teams of comedians are each given a prop each and must improvise with them to humorous effect.

== Notable prop comics ==
The following performers are known for using props:

- Tommy Cooper
- Tom Eaton
- Gallagher
- Ernie Kovacs
- Rip Taylor
- Scott Christopher Thompson, better known as Carrot Top
