= Paul M. Gagnon =

American attorney

United States Attorney for the District of New Hampshire
- In office December 1993 – May 31, 2001
- President: Bill Clinton; George W. Bush
- Preceded by: Jeffrey R. Howard
- Succeeded by: Thomas P. Colantuono

Personal details
- Political party: Democratic

Paul M. Gagnon is an American attorney who served as the United States Attorney for the District of New Hampshire from 1993 to 2001. He was previously elected Hillsborough County Attorney in 1982 and 1984.
