= Thomas P. Colantuono =

Former United States Attorney for the District of New Hampshire

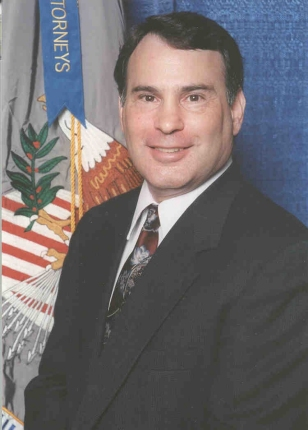

United States Attorney for the District of New Hampshire
- In office December 2001 – March 2009
- President: George W. Bush; Barack Obama
- Preceded by: Paul M. Gagnon
- Succeeded by: John P. Kacavas

Member of the New Hampshire Executive Council from the 4th district
- In office January 7, 1999 – December 2001
- Preceded by: James Normand
- Succeeded by: Raymond Wieczorek

Member of the New Hampshire Senate from the 14th district
- In office December 3, 1990 – December 3, 1996
- Preceded by: Rhona Charbonneau
- Succeeded by: Gary Francoeur

Personal details
- Born: October 4, 1951 (age 74)
- Party: Republican
- Education: Duke University (BA); Boston College (JD)

Thomas P. Colantuono (born October 4, 1951) is an American attorney who served as the United States Attorney for the District of New Hampshire from 2001 to 2009. He previously served in the New Hampshire Senate from the 14th district from 1990 to 1996 and on the New Hampshire Executive Council from the 4th district from 1999 to 2001. He ran for New Hampshire's 1st congressional district in the 1996 election. He lost the Republican primary to John E. Sununu.
