= John Scammon =

American politician and lawyer

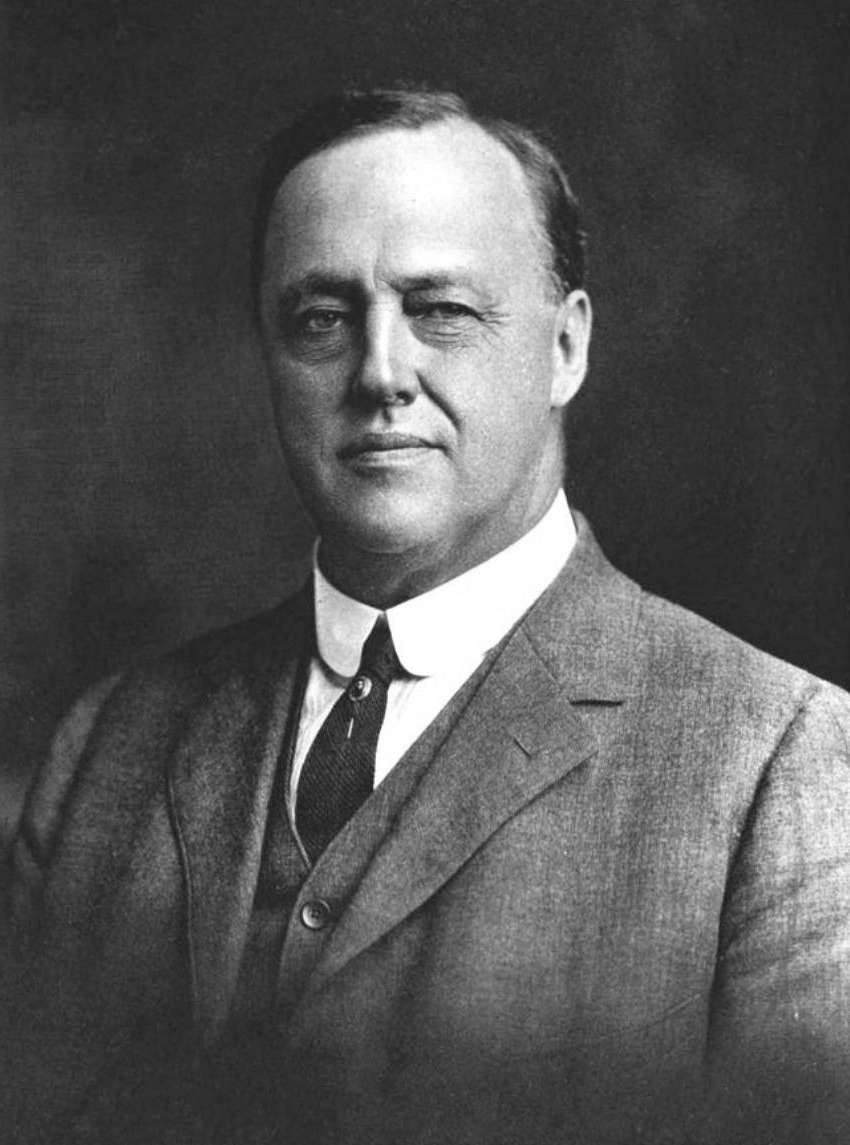

Associate Justice of the Superior Court
- In office November 1925 – 1936
- Preceded by: George H. Adams
- Succeeded by: Harry T. Lord

President of the New Hampshire Senate
- In office January 2, 1907 – April 5, 1907

Member of the New Hampshire Senate
- In office January 2, 1907 – April 5, 1907

Member of the New Hampshire House of Representatives
- In office 1913–1913

Member of the New Hampshire House of Representatives
- In office 1905–1905

Member of the New Hampshire House of Representatives
- In office 1903–1903

Personal details
- Born: September 30, 1865 Stratham, New Hampshire
- Died: April 8, 1940 (aged 74) Keene, New Hampshire
- Party: Republican

John Scammon (September 30, 1865 – April 8, 1940) was an American politician and lawyer who served as the President of the New Hampshire Senate and as an associate justice of the New Hampshire Superior Court.

== Biography ==
Scammon was born September 30, 1865, in Stratham, New Hampshire.

On January 2, 1907, Scammon was elected as the President of the New Hampshire Senate. In 1931, he was president of the New Hampshire Bar Association.

Scammon died on April 8, 1940, in Keene, New Hampshire.

== Notes ==
Legal offices
Preceded by	Associate Justice of the New Hampshire Superior Court; November, 1925–1936	Succeeded by
Political offices
Preceded by George H. Adams	President of the New Hampshire Senate; January 2, 1907 – April 5, 1907	Succeeded by Harry T. Lord
