= Harry T. Lord =

American politician and lawyer

Harry True Lord
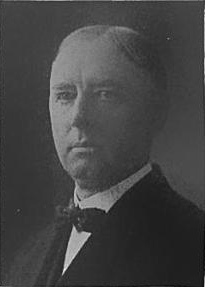

Member of the New Hampshire Executive Council Second District
- In office 1911–1912

President of the New Hampshire Senate
- In office 1909–1911

Member of the New Hampshire Senate Seventeenth District
- In office 1908–1911

Member of the New Hampshire House of Representatives Manchester, New Hampshire Ward 4
- In office 1920 – September 1, 1923
- Preceded by: James E. French

Member of the New Hampshire House of Representatives
- In office 1905–1908

Delegate to the New Hampshire Constitutional Convention Representing Manchester, New Hampshire Ward 4
- In office 1902–1902

President of the Manchester, New Hampshire Common Council
- In office 1899–1902

Member of the Manchester, New Hampshire Common Council Ward 4
- In office 1899–1902

Personal details
- Born: May 7, 1863 Manchester, New Hampshire
- Died: September 1, 1923 (aged 60) Manchester, New Hampshire
- Party: Republican
- Spouse(s): Flora J. Cooper; m. September 27, 1897; Florence M. Stanley m. October 16, 1912
- Children: Elizabeth Lord born July 13, 1899

Harry True Lord (May 7, 1863 – September 1, 1923) was an American politician and lawyer who served as a Republican member of the New Hampshire Executive Council, President of the New Hampshire Senate, as a Member of the New Hampshire House of Representatives and as a member of and the President of the Manchester, New Hampshire Common Council.

Lord was born May 7, 1863, to Harrison Dearborn and Julia (True) Lord in Manchester, New Hampshire.

Lord graduated from Dartmouth College in 1887. For several years after he graduated from Dartmouth Lord worked as a school teacher. His father encouraged him to study law and so he read for the law at the office of Hon. David Taggart and he was admitted to the New Hampshire Bar in 1894.

For several years after he graduated from Dartmouth Lord worked as a school teacher,

On September 27, 1897, Lord married Flora J. Cooper, and they had a daughter Elizabeth Lord born on July 13, 1899. After Flora died, Lord married Florence M. Stanley on October 16, 1912.

== Notes ==
Political offices
Preceded by John Scammon	President of the New Hampshire Senate; 1909–1911	Succeeded by William D. Swart
