= William D. Swart =

American politician

William Dumond Swart
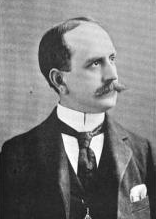

Member of the New Hampshire Executive Council
- In office 1917–1919

President of the New Hampshire Senate
- In office 1911–1912
- Preceded by: Harry T. Lord
- Succeeded by: Enos K. Sawyer

Member of the New Hampshire Senate District 19
- In office 1911–1912

Member of the New Hampshire House of Representatives
- In office 1909–1910

President of the Nashua, New Hampshire Common Council
- In office 1894–1895

Member of the Nashua, New Hampshire Common Council
- In office 1893–1895

Personal details
- Born: July 9, 1856 Margaretville, New York
- Died: 1936 (aged 79–80)
- Spouse: Lizzie A. Roby
- Children: Elizabeth Swart; William Roby Swart

William Dumond Swart (July 9, 1856 – 1936) was an American merchant, manufacturer and politician from Nashua, New Hampshire.

Swart was born on July 9, 1856 in Margaretville, New York to William R. and Eliza (Drumond) Swart.

On October 7, 1890 Swart married Lizzie A. Roby. They had two children, Elizabeth Swart and William Roby Swart.

Swart was a thirty-second degree mason.

Swart served as a member and President of the Nashua, New Hampshire Common Council, and in both houses of the New Hampshire legislature as President of the New Hampshire Senate and as a member of the New Hampshire Executive Council.

== Notes ==
Political offices
Preceded by Harry T. Lord	President of the New Hampshire Senate; 1911–1912	Succeeded by Enos K. Sawyer
