= Thomas N. Hastings =

American politician

Thomas Nelson Hastings
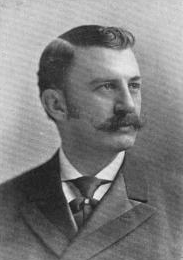

President of the New Hampshire Senate
- In office 1899–1901
- Preceded by: Chester B. Jordan
- Succeeded by: Bertram Ellis

Member of the New Hampshire Senate

Personal details
- Born: May 23, 1858 Cambridge, Massachusetts
- Died: May 15, 1907 (aged 48) Boston, Massachusetts
- Spouse: Amy Bridge
- Education: Massachusetts Institute of Technology

Thomas Nelson Hastings (May 23, 1858 – May 15, 1907) was an American politician and architect who served as the President of the New Hampshire Senate.

On January 4, 1899, Hastings was chosen as the President of the New Hampshire Senate.

Hastings died at the Parker House Hotel in Boston on May 15, 1907.

== Notes ==
Political offices
Preceded by Chester B. Jordan	President of the New Hampshire Senate; 1899-1901	Succeeded by Bertram Ellis
