= Chester B. Jordan =

American politician (1839–1914)

Chester Jordan
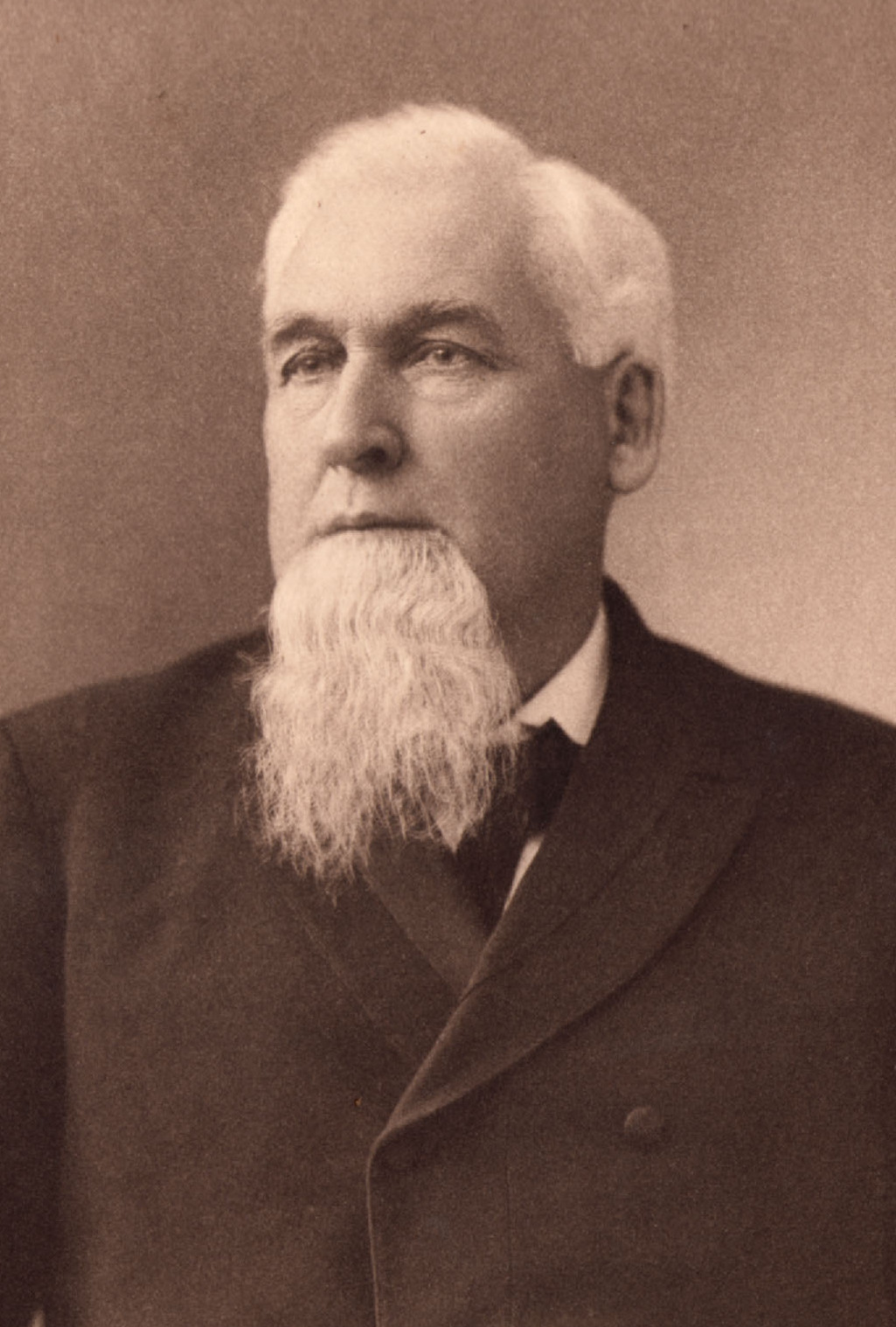

48th Governor of New Hampshire
- In office January 3, 1901 – January 1, 1903
- Preceded by: Frank W. Rollins
- Succeeded by: Nahum J. Bachelder

President of the New Hampshire Senate
- In office 1897–1899
- Preceded by: Frank W. Rollins
- Succeeded by: Thomas N. Hastings

Speaker of the New Hampshire House of Representatives
- In office 1881–1883
- Preceded by: Henry H. Huse
- Succeeded by: Samuel C. Eastman

Personal details
- Born: Chester Bradley Jordan; October 15, 1839 Colebrook, New Hampshire, U.S.
- Died: August 24, 1914 (aged 74) Lancaster, New Hampshire, U.S.
- Party: Republican
- Spouse: Ida R. Nutter (m. 1879)
- Children: 4
- Education: Kimball Union Academy
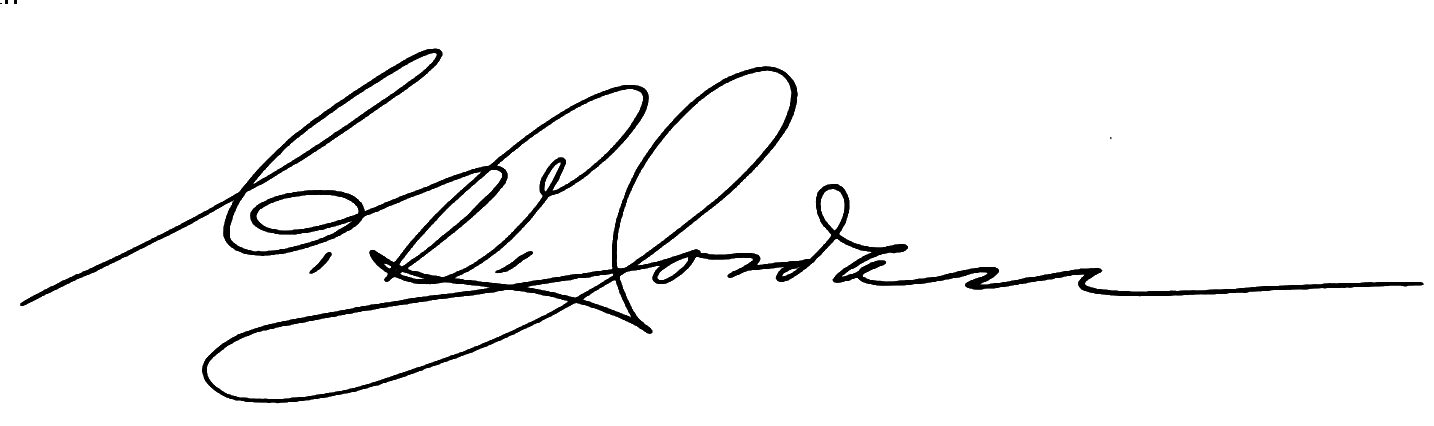
- Signature

Chester Bradley Jordan (October 15, 1839 – August 24, 1914) was an American teacher, lawyer, and Republican politician from Lancaster, New Hampshire. He was governor of New Hampshire from 1901 to 1903. Prior to becoming governor he was Speaker of the New Hampshire House of Representatives and President of the New Hampshire Senate.

== Biography ==
Jordan was born October 15, 1839, in Colebrook, New Hampshire, to Johnson and Minerva (Buel) Jordan,

In 1897, Jordan became the owner of the Coos Republican.

Jordan served in both houses of the New Hampshire legislature and had the dual honor of heading both. He was Speaker of the New Hampshire House of Representatives in 1881 and President of the New Hampshire Senate from 1896 to 1898.

He served as the 48th governor of New Hampshire from 1901 to 1903.

Jordan died in 1914 in Lancaster, New Hampshire, where he is buried in Summer Street Cemetery.

Party political offices
Preceded by Frank W. Rollins	Republican nominee for Governor of New Hampshire; 1900	Succeeded by Nahum J. Bachelder
Political offices
Preceded by Frank W. Rollins	Governor of New Hampshire; 1901–1903	Succeeded by Nahum J. Bachelder
Preceded by Frank W. Rollins	President of the New Hampshire Senate; 1897–1899	Succeeded by Thomas N. Hastings
Preceded by Henry H. Huse	Speaker of the New Hampshire House of Representatives; 1881–1883	Succeeded by Samuel C. Eastman
