= Tom Eaton (comedian) =

- Born: April 8, 1982 (age 43); Los Angeles, California, U.S.
- Occupation: Prop comic
- Notable work: Comedy Central Roast of Chevy Chase
- Height: 6 ft 1 in (185 cm)

Tom Eaton (born April 8, 1982) is a prop comic. Eaton has performed his comedy act in over three countries and on two continents. He tours nationally in the U.S. with his "trunk o' junk", the trademark of his prop comedy.

== Biography ==
=== Early life ===
Eaton was born in Orange County, California, on April 8, 1982. He is the son of Thomas Eaton Sr., a sandwich magnate from Wisconsin. He began performing in junior high school theater, playing the role of Sancho Panza in the Spiro Agnew Junior High School production of Man of La Mancha.

== Career ==
After briefly moving to Chicago, he was tapped as a presenter for the 2002 Comedy Central Roast of Chevy Chase

In 2004, Eaton was in early talks with ESPN2 to act as the sidekick for a late-night sports variety show hosted by Scottie Pippen called Just Inside the Arc. ESPN opted to fill the time slot with World Series of Poker reruns.

Eaton was awarded the Don Knotts Memorial Award by the Greater San Bernardino, California, Key Club for his contributions to their 2006 "Suds and Duds" car wash–clothing drive. He is the second recipient of this award.

Eaton is also the voice of Emilio the Llama in the web cartoon Two for Tacos, which was released on the web in fall 2009.

In the mid-2000s, Eaton was in talks to play a supporting role in the direct to video feature Hotel for Dogs 2: K9 Kruise, its follow up Hotel for Dogs 3: Puppies in Paradise, and the accompanying web series Hotel for Dogs: Viva Paws Vegas. None of these projects were ever completed.
