= Rhona Charbonneau =

American politician (1928–2017)

Member of the New Hampshire House of Representatives
- In office 1970s–1980s
- Constituency: District 38

Member of the New Hampshire Senate from the 14th district
- In office 1984–1990
- Succeeded by: Thomas P. Colantuono

Personal details
- Born: February 20, 1928
- Died: May 17, 2017 (aged 89)
- Party: Republican

Rhona Mae Charbonneau (née Shay; February 20, 1928 – May 17, 2017) was an American politician from New Hampshire. She was active in public life in the town of Hudson. She served as Hillsborough County commissioner. Charbonneau was Chair of the New Hampshire Republican State Committee from 1989 to 1993.

She served in the New Hampshire House of Representatives and the New Hampshire Senate. In May 2009, she was critically injured in a car crash.

Charbonneau endorsed the Rudy Giuliani 2008 presidential campaign and the Jeb Bush 2016 presidential campaign.
