= Charles A. Busiel =

American politician (1842–1901)

Charles Albert Busiel
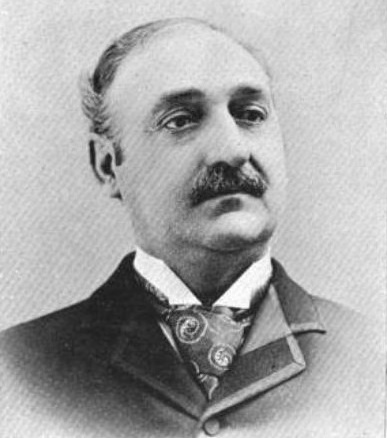

45th Governor of New Hampshire
- In office January 3, 1895 – January 7, 1897
- Preceded by: John B. Smith
- Succeeded by: George A. Ramsdell

Member of the New Hampshire Senate
- In office 1878

Personal details
- Born: November 24, 1842 Meredith, New Hampshire
- Died: August 29, 1901 (aged 58) Laconia, New Hampshire
- Party: Republican
- Spouse: Eunice Elizabeth Preston
- Children: Frances Evelyn Busiel
- Profession: Business executive Manufacturer; Politician

Charles Albert Busiel (November 24, 1842 – August 29, 1901) was an American manufacturer, politician, and the 45th governor of New Hampshire.

== Early life ==
Born at Meredith Village, New Hampshire, Busiel was educated at the public schools and Gilford Academy. He worked in the family hosiery mill training in all departments of the mill to learn the business.

== Career ==
In 1863, he purchased the Pitman Manufactory, which he ran for a few years then sold. He and two brothers continued in hosiery, and he also invested in railroads, then expanded into the banking and publishing industries.

Elected as a Democrat in 1878, Busiel was a representative in the New Hampshire House of Representatives. He became a Republican over the issue of tariffs and served several years as mayor of Laconia.

In 1894, Busiel was elected Governor of New Hampshire and served from January 3, 1895, to January 7, 1897. During his tenure, financial programs were initiated to boost the state's economy, electric trolley and railroad services were promoted. He was president of the Laconia National Bank and the City Savings Bank. He was president of Lake Shore Railroad and director of the Concord & Montreal Railroad. He was a delegate to Democratic National Convention from New Hampshire, 1880, and mayor of Laconia, New Hampshire, 1893-1895.

== Death ==
Busiel died August 29, 1901(age 58 years, 278 days), of coronary heart disease in Laconia. His death was less than two weeks after the death by drowning of his grandson and namesake, Charles Busiel Smith. He is interred in a mausoleum at the Union Cemetery in Laconia, New Hampshire.

== Family life ==
The son of John W. and Julia (Tilton) Busiel, Busiel married, on November 21, 1864, Eunice Elizabeth Preston, daughter of Worcester and Nancy (Evans) Preston, a native of Concord, New Hampshire. They had one child, Frances Evelyn Busiel, who later married Wilson Longstreth Smith of Germantown, Pennsylvania.

Party political offices
Preceded by John Butler Smith	Republican nominee for Governor of New Hampshire; 1894	Succeeded by George A. Ramsdell
Political offices
Preceded by John B. Smith	Governor of New Hampshire; 1895–1897	Succeeded by George A. Ramsdell
