= George A. Ramsdell =

American politician (1834–1900)

George Allen Ramsdell
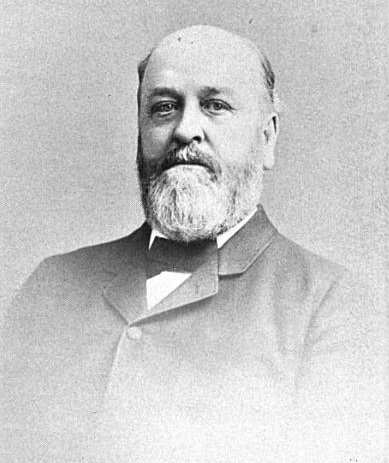

46th Governor of New Hampshire
- In office January 7, 1897 – January 5, 1899
- Preceded by: Charles A. Busiel
- Succeeded by: Frank W. Rollins

Member of the New Hampshire Senate

Member of the New Hampshire House of Representatives
- In office 1869–1872

Personal details
- Born: March 11, 1834 Milford, New Hampshire
- Died: November 16, 1900 (aged 66) Nashua, New Hampshire
- Party: Republican
- Spouse: Eliza D. Wilson
- Education: Amherst College
- Profession: Attorney

George Allen Ramsdell (March 11, 1834 – November 16, 1900) was an American lawyer, businessman, and Republican politician from Nashua, New Hampshire. He served as the 46th governor of New Hampshire from 1897 to 1899.

== Biography ==
George A. Ramsdell was born in Milford, New Hampshire on March 11, 1834. He graduated from the McCollom Institute in Mont Vernon and attended Amherst College for a year. Ramsdell then studied law, was admitted to the bar, and established a practice in Peterborough.

A Republican, Ramsdell served as treasurer of Hillsborough County from 1861 to 1862, and County Clerk from 1864 to 1887. In 1864 he moved to Amherst, and in 1866 he became a resident of Nashua. In addition to practicing law, Ramsdell was active in several businesses, including banks and railroads, and he served as president of Nashua's First National Bank. In 1871 he received an honorary Master of Arts degree from Dartmouth College.

Ramsdell served in the New Hampshire House of Representatives from 1869 to 1872, and was a delegate to the 1876 State Constitutional Convention. From 1891 to 1892 he was a member of the state Executive Council. In 1894 he ran for governor and lost the Republican nomination to Charles A. Busiel.

In 1896 Ramsdell was elected to a two-year term as governor, and he served from 1897 to 1899. His time in office was marked by creation of state board to oversee licensing of physicians and surgeons and mobilizing volunteers to serve in the Spanish–American War.

Ramsdell died in Nashua on November 16, 1900, and was buried in Nashua's Edgewood Cemetery.

Party political offices
Preceded by Charles A. Busiel	Republican nominee for Governor of New Hampshire; 1896	Succeeded by Frank W. Rollins
Political offices
Preceded by Charles A. Busiel	Governor of New Hampshire; 1897–1899	Succeeded by Frank W. Rollins
