= John McLane =

American politician

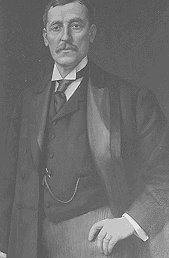

50th Governor of New Hampshire
- In office January 5, 1905 – January 3, 1907
- Preceded by: Nahum J. Bachelder
- Succeeded by: Charles M. Floyd

Member of the New Hampshire Senate
- In office 1891

Member of the New Hampshire House of Representatives
- In office 1885

Personal details
- Born: February 27, 1852 Lennoxtown, Scotland
- Died: April 13, 1911 (aged 59) Pinehurst, North Carolina, U.S.
- Resting place: West Street Cemetery, Milford
- Party: Republican
- Spouse: Ellen Luetta Tuck (m. 1880)
- Children: 4
- Profession: Manufacture of furniture
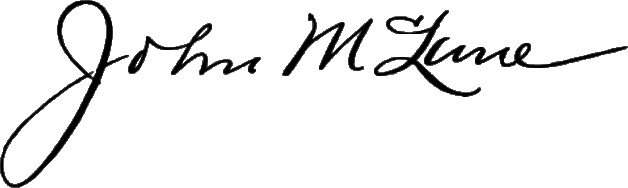
- Signature

John McLane (February 27, 1852 – April 13, 1911) was a Scottish-American furniture maker and politician who served as the 50th governor of New Hampshire from 1905 to 1907.

== Biography ==
McLane was born in Lennoxtown, Stirlingshire, in Scotland, the son of Mary, née Hay and Alexander McLane, and was brought to America with his family in 1853, when he was one year old. They settled in Manchester, and moved to Milford in 1869. On finishing school he became a cabinetmaker's apprentice, going on to open his own shop in 1876. The business's success as one of the largest manufacturers of post-office furniture in North America secured other business opportunities for him including becoming director of the Milford Granite Company, the Souheagan National Bank and the New Hampshire Fire Insurance Company.

On March 10, 1880 he married Ellen Luetta Tuck (1855–1927), and together they had four children, Clinton Averill McLane (born 1881), Hazel Ellen McLane (born 1885), John Roy McLane (born 1886), and Charles Malcolm McLane (born 1895). His great-granddaughter, Ann McLane Kuster, was the New Hampshire Representative in the 2nd District in the U. S. House of Representatives from 2013 to 2025, at which time she chose not to run again.

McLane was elected, as a Republican, to the New Hampshire House of Representatives in 1885, and to the New Hampshire Senate in 1891, representing the 16th District 1891-92 and the 15th District 1893-94. He was president of the senate during his two terms. He was a delegate to the Republican National Convention from New Hampshire in 1900, and was elected governor in 1904.

As governor, McLane was instrumental in securing funding for highway improvement, and welcomed delegates to the Russo-Japanese War Peace Conference, which was held in Portsmouth during his term in office.

He died in Pinehurst, Moore County, North Carolina, and was interred at the West Street Cemetery, Milford, New Hampshire.

== See also ==
- List of United States governors born outside the United States

Party political offices
Preceded by Nahum J. Bachelder	Republican nominee for Governor of New Hampshire; 1904	Succeeded by Charles M. Floyd
Political offices
Preceded by Nahum J. Bachelder	Governor of New Hampshire; 1905–1907	Succeeded by Charles M. Floyd
Preceded by David A. Taggart	President of the New Hampshire Senate; 1891–1895	Succeeded by Frank W. Rollins
