= F. W. Hastings =

American politician

Frank W. Hastings
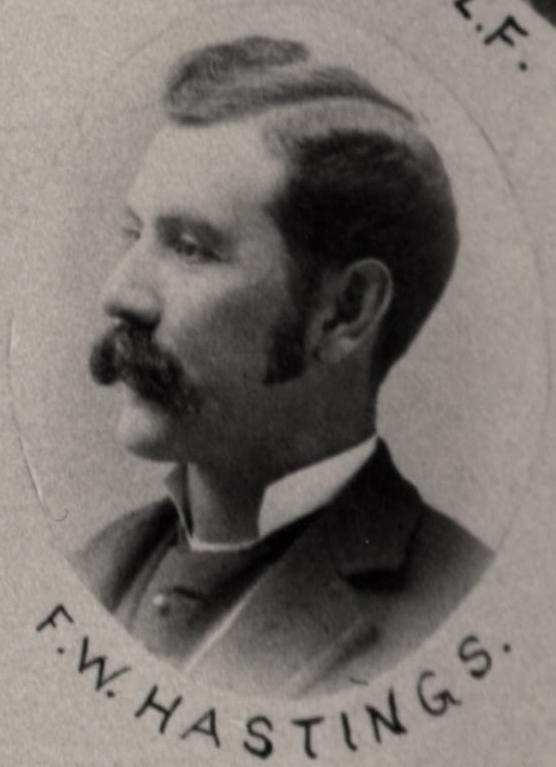
- Hastings in 1891

Member of the Washington State Senate for the 30th district
- In office 1891–1895

Personal details
- Born: November 12, 1848 Portland, Oregon, United States
- Died: February 9, 1935 (aged 86) Port Townsend, Washington, United States
- Party: Republican

Francis (Frank) W. Hastings (November 12, 1848 – February 9, 1935) was an American politician in the state of Washington. He served in the Washington State Senate from 1891 to 1895.
