= Enos K. Sawyer =

American politician (1879-1933)

Enos Kittredge Sawyer
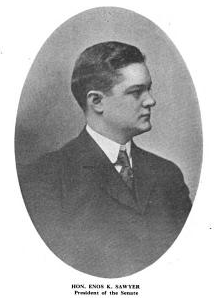

New Hampshire Secretary of State
- In office 1923–1925
- Governor: Fred H. Brown
- Preceded by: Edwin C. Bean
- Succeeded by: Hobart Pillsbury

President of the New Hampshire Senate
- Preceded by: William D. Swart
- Succeeded by: George I. Haselton

Member of the New Hampshire Senate District 6

Mayor of Franklin, New Hampshire
- In office 1909–1910
- Majority: 77 (1909)

Personal details
- Born: August 24, 1879 Franklin, New Hampshire
- Died: March 2, 1933 (aged 53) Franklin, New Hampshire
- Party: Democratic
- Spouse: Mabel E. White (m. 1911)
- Education: Phillips Academy; Dartmouth College
- Profession: Grocery business

Enos Kittredge Sawyer (August 24, 1879 – March 2, 1933) was an American politician who served as the mayor of Franklin, New Hampshire, President of the New Hampshire Senate and as the New Hampshire Secretary of State.

== Biography ==
Sawyer was born on August 24, 1879, in Franklin, New Hampshire, to George W. and Louise C. (Barnes) Sawyer.

Sawyer was educated in Franklin High School, Phillips Academy and Dartmouth College.

1n 1908 Sawyer was elected the Mayor of Franklin, New Hampshire, by 77 votes.

After he left Dartmouth College, Sawyer went to work in his father's meat, grocery, and provision business.

On February 28, 1911, Sawyer married Mabel E. White of Somerville, Massachusetts, who was a teacher in the Franklin schools.

In 1912 Sawyer was elected to the New Hampshire Senate from District 6. In 1913 Sawyer was chosen as the President of the New Hampshire Senate, Sawyer was the first Democrat elected as Senate President since 1876 and he was the last Democrat elected until 1999.

In 1918 Sawyer was appointed the Director of the United States Employment Service in New Hampshire and Vermont.

Sawyer died in Franklin, New Hampshire, on March 2, 1933.

== Notes ==
Political offices
Preceded by Edwin C. Bean	New Hampshire Secretary of State; 1923–1925	Succeeded by Hobart Pillsbury
Preceded by William D. Swart	President of the New Hampshire Senate; 1913–1915	Succeeded by George I. Haselton
