= Frank W. Rollins =

American politician (1860–1915)

Frank West Rollins
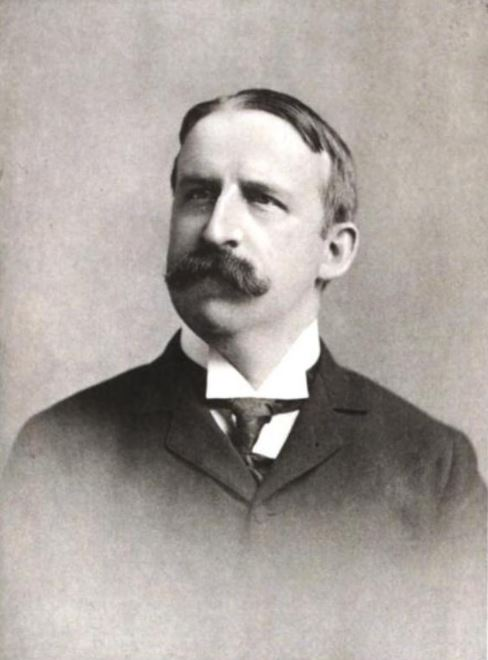

47th Governor of New Hampshire
- In office January 5, 1899 – January 3, 1901
- Preceded by: George A. Ramsdell
- Succeeded by: Chester B. Jordan

President of the New Hampshire Senate
- In office 1895–1897
- Preceded by: John McLane
- Succeeded by: Chester B. Jordan

Member of the New Hampshire Senate

Personal details
- Born: February 24, 1860 Concord, New Hampshire, U.S.
- Died: October 27, 1915 (aged 55) Boston, Massachusetts, U.S.
- Party: Republican
- Spouse: Katherine W. Pecker
- Education: Massachusetts Institute of Technology; Harvard University
- Profession: Attorney

Frank West Rollins (February 24, 1860 – October 27, 1915) was an American lawyer, banker, and Republican politician from Concord, New Hampshire. He served New Hampshire in the state's Senate (as its president in 1895) and as the 47th governor from 1899 to 1901. Rollins and others founded the Society for the Protection of New Hampshire Forests in 1901, a private organization to protect the forests now known as the "Forest Society." A shelter was built in his honor at Lost River in Kinsman Notch, New Hampshire in 1912, and remains there.

As governor of New Hampshire, he invented and founded "Old Home Week" intended to remind New Hampshiremen to return to their hometowns. This was in response to the large numbers of people moving to the Midwest (Minnesota in particular) because of the slow economy in the northeast at the time. He and his father started the investment banking firm of E.H. Rollins and Sons, which became one of the largest in the country by the crash of 1929. After the crash, it was very diminished and finally closed in the 1940s. New research shows that Rollins and Senator John Weeks collaborated on the founding of the National Forest Act of 1911, signed by the President William Howard Taft.

Frank W. Rollins died at the Hotel Somerset in Boston on October 27, 1915.

Rollins' 1890 mansion, the Gov. Frank West Rollins House on North State Street in Concord, is listed on the National Register of Historic Places. His father, Edward H. Rollins, represented New Hampshire in the United States Senate.

Party political offices
Preceded by George A. Ramsdell	Republican nominee for Governor of New Hampshire; 1898	Succeeded by Chester B. Jordan
Political offices
Preceded by George A. Ramsdell	Governor of New Hampshire; 1899–1901	Succeeded by Chester B. Jordan
Preceded by John McLane	President of the New Hampshire Senate; 1895–1896	Succeeded by Chester B. Jordan
