= Thomas R. Eaton =

American politician

124th President of the New Hampshire State Senate
- In office December 4, 2002 – September 9, 2005 (resigned)
- Preceded by: Arthur P. Klemm, Jr.
- Succeeded by: Theodore Gatsas

Member of the New Hampshire Senate from the 10th district
- In office November 1999 – 2006
- Preceded by: Clesson J. Blaisdell
- Succeeded by: Molly Kelly

Personal details
- Born: Keene, New Hampshire
- Party: Republican
- Profession: Mortician
- Nickname: Tom

Thomas R. Eaton (born c. 1949) is a New Hampshire businessman and politician who served as a member of and President of the New Hampshire Senate.

== Early life ==
Eaton was born in Keene and was raised in Stoddard, New Hampshire.

== Education ==
From first through eighth grades Eaton attended school in a one-room schoolhouse in Stoddard, New Hampshire. He then went on to Keene High School and to the New England Institute of Anatomy in Boston, Massachusetts. graduated with high honors

== Business career ==
At the age of seventeen Eaton went to work at the Fletcher Funeral Home in Keene. Over his 34-year career at the Home, Eaton went from being a driver to the Home's president and treasurer. In 2000, after being elected to the New Hampshire Senate, Eaton retired from the Home.

== State Senate ==
In November 1999 Eaton was elected in a special election for the tenth District of the New Hampshire Senate, to fill the vacancy caused by the death of Clesson Blaisdell. This is the same New Hampshire Senate district that Eaton's father Charles Eaton represented from 1959 to 1962. Senator Eaton was named by NH Business Magazine one of the 10 most influential people 3 years in a row.

Political offices
Preceded by Arthur P. Klemm, Jr.	124th President of the New Hampshire Senate; December 4, 2002–September 9, 2005	Succeeded by Theodore Gatsas
