= Leslie Perkins Snow =

American judge (1862–1934)

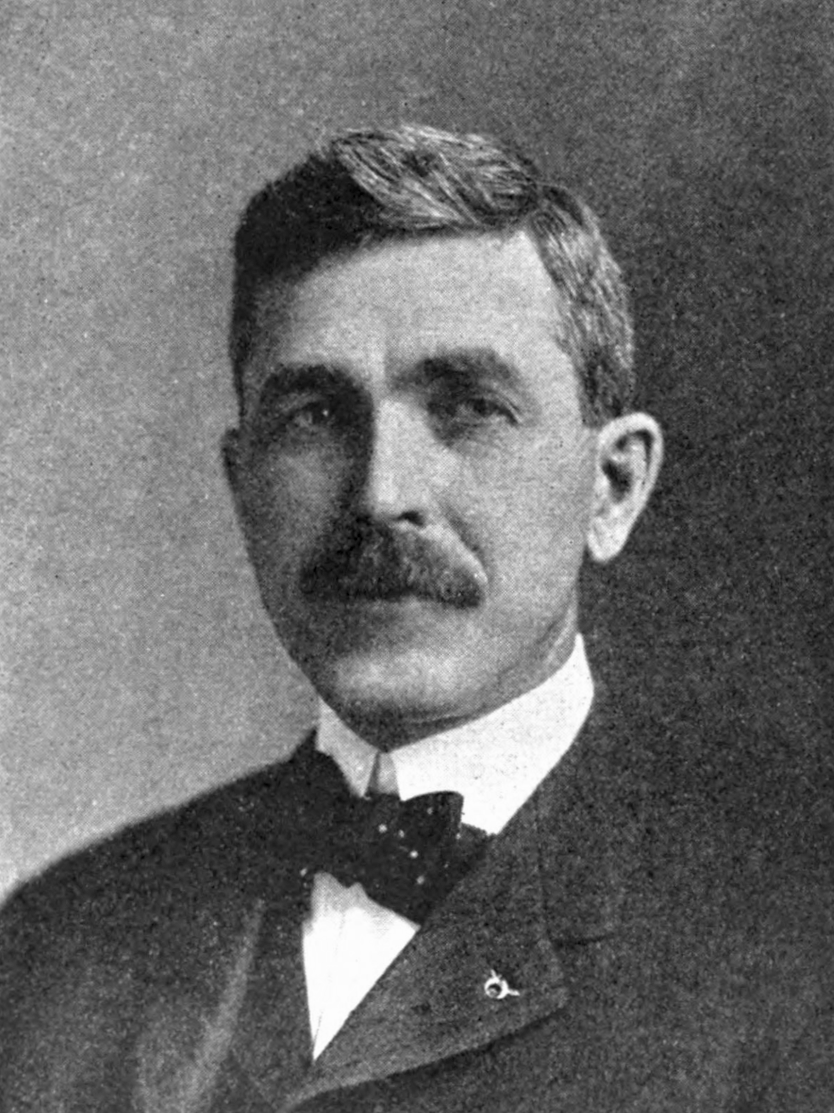

Associate Justice of the New Hampshire Supreme Court
- In office 1921–1932

President of the New Hampshire Senate
- In office 1921

Member of the New Hampshire House of Representatives
- In office 1887–1888

Personal details
- Born: October 19, 1862 Eaton, New Hampshire
- Died: March 16, 1934 (aged 71) Rochester, New Hampshire
- Party: Republican
- Spouses: Susan E. Currier (m. 1888; died 1892) Norma C. Currier (m. 1894)
- Education: Dartmouth College; George Washington University
- Occupation: Jurist
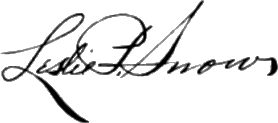
- Signature

Leslie Perkins Snow (October 19, 1862 – March 16, 1934) was a justice of the New Hampshire Supreme Court from 1921 to 1932.

== Biography ==
Leslie Perkins Snow was born in Eaton, New Hampshire on October 19, 1862. He became a schoolteacher by the age of 16. He received a BA from Dartmouth College and a law degree from George Washington University (then called Columbian College) in 1891. He gained admission to the bar in Maryland in 1891, and in New Hampshire the following year. He became prominent in law and business.

A Republican, Snow was a member of the New Hampshire House of Representatives from 1887 to 1888.

He married Susan E. Currier on November 28, 1888, and they had two children. She died on June 6, 1892, and he remarried to her sister Norma C. Currier on June 27, 1894.

In 1919, he was president of the New Hampshire Bar Association. Snow served in the New Hampshire Senate, becoming President of the Senate by 1921. On April 8, 1921, Governor Albert O. Brown announced Snow's nomination to the state supreme court.

Snow retired from the court in 1932 at the mandatory age of 70, and died at his home in Rochester from a heart attack on March 16, 1934.

Political offices
Preceded by Reuben E. Walker	Justice of the New Hampshire Supreme Court; 1921–1932	Succeeded by Peter Woodbury
