= Clesson J. Blaisdell =

American politician

122nd President of the New Hampshire State Senate
- Succeeded by: William Lynch

Member of the New Hampshire Senate from the 10th district
- Succeeded by: Thomas R. Eaton

Personal details
- Born: September 28, 1926 Keene, New Hampshire, U.S.
- Died: August 26, 1999 (aged 72) Lebanon, New Hampshire, U.S.
- Party: Democratic
- Profession: Merchant
- Nickname: Junie

Military service
- Branch/service: United States Navy
- Years of service: 1944–1946
- Battles/wars: World War II

Clesson J. Blaisdell (September 28, 1926 – August 26, 1999) was a New Hampshire businessman and politician who served as a member of and President of the New Hampshire Senate.

== Family life ==
Blaisdell had three children, Peter, Michael and Lucinda, with his wife, Beverly, known as Peggy.

== Early life ==
Blaisdell was born to Clesson Blaisdell on September 18, 1926.

== Education ==
Blaisdell graduated from Keene High School.

== Military service ==
From 1944 to 1946, during World War II, Blaisdell served in the United States Navy in the Asiatic/Pacific theater.

== State senate ==
Blaisdell was elected to the New Hampshire Senate fifteen times, and in his fifteenth term he was chosen as the 123rd President of that body. Blaisdell was the first Democrat to be elected President of the state senate since 1912.

== Business career ==
Blaisdell owned and operated a sporting goods store in Keene.

== Death ==
Blaisdell died at the Dartmouth–Hitchcock Medical Center in Lebanon, New Hampshire.

Political offices
Preceded by	122nd President of the New Hampshire Senate; 1999 – August 1999	Succeeded by William Lynch
