= 1916 New Hampshire gubernatorial election =

- November 7, 1916
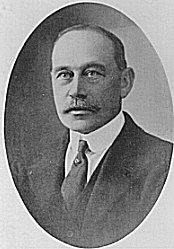

Nominee	Henry W. Keyes	John C. Hutchins
Party	Republican	Democratic
Popular vote	45,899	38,853
Percentage	53.22%	45.05%
- Keyes: 40-50% 50–60% 60–70% 70–80% 80–90% >90% Hutchins: 40-50% 50–60% 60–70% 70–80% 80–90% >90% Tie: 40-50% 50%
Governor before election
Rolland H. Spaulding
Republican
Elected Governor
Henry W. Keyes
Republican

The 1916 New Hampshire gubernatorial election was held on November 7, 1916. Incumbent Republican Governor Rolland H. Spaulding declined to seek re-election. Republican nominee Henry W. Keyes, the former chairman of the state Excise Commission, defeated former State Senator John C. Hutchins, the Democratic nominee, with 53 percent of the vote.

== Democratic primary ==
=== Candidates ===
- John C. Hutchins, former state senator, 1914 Democratic candidate for governor
- Albert W. Noone, former executive councilor, 1914 Democratic nominee for governor

=== Results ===
Democratic primary results
Party	Candidate	Votes	%
Democratic	John C. Hutchins	4,855	61.97%
Democratic	Albert W. Noone	2,979	38.03%
Total votes		7,834	100.00%

== Republican primary ==
=== Candidates ===
- Henry W. Keyes, former chairman of the New Hampshire State Excise Commission
- Rosecrans W. Pillsbury, former newspaper publisher and shoe manufacturer

=== Results ===
Republican primary results
Party	Candidate	Votes	%
Republican	Henry W. Keyes	12,724	56.79%
Republican	Huntley N. Spaulding	9,683	43.21%
Total votes		22,407	100.00%

== General election ==
=== Results ===
1916 New Hampshire gubernatorial election
Party	Candidate	Votes	%	±%
Republican	Henry W. Keyes	45,899	53.22%	−1.96%
Democratic	John C. Hutchins	38,853	45.05%	+5.01%
Socialist	William H. Wilkins	1,199	1.39%	−0.30%
Prohibition	Ralph E. Meras	288	0.33%	—
Write-in		3	0.00%	—
Majority		7,046	8.17%	−6.98%
Total votes		86,242	100.00%	
Republican hold				
