= 1930 United States Senate election in New Hampshire =

- November 4, 1930
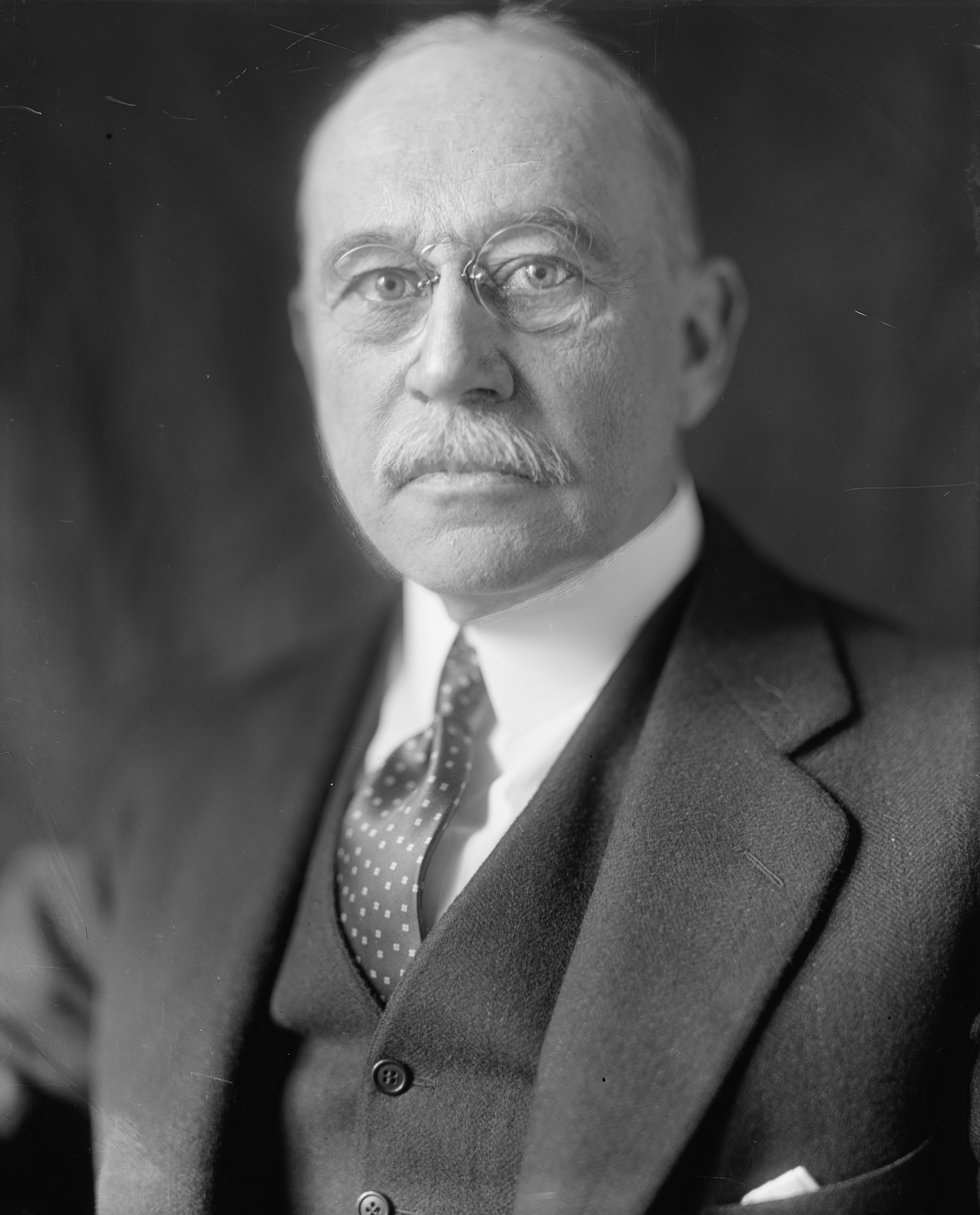

Nominee	Henry W. Keyes	Albert W. Noone
Party	Republican	Democratic
Popular vote	72,225	52,284
Percentage	57.88%	41.90%
- Keyes: 50–60% 60–70% 70–80% 80–90% >90% Noone: 50–60% 60–70% 70–80% Tie: 50%
Senator before election
Henry W. Keyes
Republican
Elected Senator
Henry W. Keyes
Republican

The 1930 United States Senate election in New Hampshire was held on November 4, 1930. Incumbent Republican Senator Henry W. Keyes ran for re-election to his third term. He was challenged in the general election by Albert W. Noone, the Democratic nominee. Noone, a manufacturer and former Executive Councilor who repeatedly sought statewide office, won the Democratic nominations for both Governor and U.S. Senate and refused to yield either, appearing on the general election ballot for both offices. Despite the poor national environment for Republicans, Keyes was re-elected to his third and final term in the Senate in a landslide.

== Democratic primary ==
=== Candidates ===
- Albert W. Noone, former Executive Councilor, 1914 Democratic nominee for Governor (also Democratic nominee for Governor)
- Amos N. Blandin, State Representative

=== Results ===
Democratic primary results
Party	Candidate	Votes	%
Democratic	Albert W. Noone	4,273	52.49%
Democratic	Amos N. Blandin	3,867	47.51%
Total votes		8,140	100.00%

== Republican primary ==
=== Candidates ===
- Henry W. Keyes, incumbent U.S. Senator

=== Results ===
Republican primary results
Party	Candidate	Votes	%
Republican	Henry W. Keyes (inc.)	31,373	100.00%
Total votes		31,373	100.00%

== General election ==
=== Results ===
1930 United States Senate election in New Hampshire
Party	Candidate	Votes	%	±%
Republican	Henry W. Keyes (inc.)	72,225	57.88%	−1.88%
Democratic	Albert W. Noone	52,284	41.90%	+1.65%
Communist	Henry C. Iram	282	0.23%	—
Majority		19,941	15.98%	−3.53%
Total votes		124,791	100.00%	
Republican hold				
