= Governor Spaulding =

Governor Spaulding may refer to:

- Huntley N. Spaulding (1869–1955), 61st Governor of New Hampshire
- Rolland H. Spaulding (1873–1942), 55th Governor of New Hampshire
