= 1918 New Hampshire gubernatorial election =

- November 5, 1918
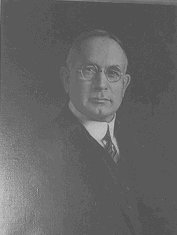

Nominee	John H. Bartlett	Nathaniel E. Martin
Party	Republican	Democratic
Popular vote	38,465	32,605
Percentage	54.12%	45.87%
- Bartlett: 50–60% 60–70% 70–80% 80–90% >90% Martin: 50–60% 60–70% 70–80% Tie: 50%
Governor before election
Henry W. Keyes
Republican
Elected Governor
John H. Bartlett
Republican

The 1918 New Hampshire gubernatorial election took place on November 5, 1918. Incumbent Republican Governor Henry W. Keyes opted to run for the U.S. Senate rather than seek re-election. Republican State Representative John H. Bartlett and Democratic State Representative Nathaniel E. Martin both won their party nominations unopposed and advanced to the general election. Bartlett ultimately defeated Martin by a wide margin, winning 54 percent of the vote to Martin's 46 percent.

== Democratic primary ==
=== Candidates ===
- Nathaniel E. Martin, State Senator

=== Results ===
Democratic primary results
Party	Candidate	Votes	%
Democratic	Nathaniel E. Martin	5,198	99.83%
Democratic	Write-ins	9	0.17%
Total votes		5,207	100.00%

== Republican primary ==
=== Candidates ===
- John H. Bartlett, State Representative

=== Results ===
Republican primary results
Party	Candidate	Votes	%
Republican	John H. Bartlett	16,463	99.79%
Republican	Write-ins	34	0.21%
Total votes		16,497	100.00%

== General election ==
=== Results ===
1916 New Hampshire gubernatorial election
Party	Candidate	Votes	%	±%
Republican	John H. Bartlett	38,465	54.12%	+0.90%
Democratic	Nathaniel E. Martin	32,605	45.87%	+0.82%
Write-in		7	0.01%	—
Majority		5,860	8.24%	+0.07%
Total votes		71,077	100.00%	
Republican hold				
