= 1922 New Hampshire gubernatorial election =

- November 7, 1922
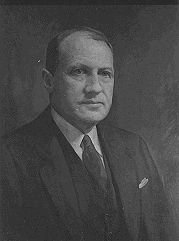

Nominee	Fred H. Brown	Windsor H. Goodnow
Party	Democratic	Republican
Popular vote	70,160	61,526
Percentage	53.28%	46.72%
- Brown: 40-50% 50–60% 60–70% 70–80% 80–90% Goodnow: 40-50% 50–60% 60–70% 70–80% 80–90% >90% Tie: 40-50% 50%
Governor before election
Albert O. Brown
Republican
Elected Governor
Fred H. Brown
Democratic

The 1922 New Hampshire gubernatorial election was held on November 7, 1922. Democratic nominee Fred H. Brown defeated Republican nominee Windsor H. Goodnow with 53.28% of the vote. Brown became the first Democrat elected Governor since 1912. This was the last time until 1962 that a Democrat was elected Governor of New Hampshire.

== General election ==
=== Candidates ===
- Fred H. Brown, Democratic
- Windsor H. Goodnow, Republican

=== Results ===
1922 New Hampshire gubernatorial election
Party	Candidate	Votes	%	±%
Democratic	Fred H. Brown	70,160	53.28%	
Republican	Windsor H. Goodnow	61,526	46.72%	
Majority		8,634		
Turnout				
Democratic gain from Republican		Swing		
