= 1920 New Hampshire gubernatorial election =

- November 2, 1920
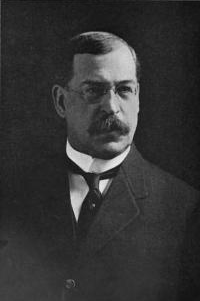

| Nominee | Albert O. Brown | Charles E. Tilton |
| Party | Republican | Democratic |
| Popular vote | 93,273 | 62,174 |
| Percentage | 59.59% | 39.72% |
- Brown: 40-50% 50–60% 60–70% 70–80% 80–90% >90% Tilton: 40-50% 50–60% 60–70% Tie: 50%
Governor before election
John H. Bartlett
Republican
Elected Governor
Albert O. Brown
Republican

The 1920 New Hampshire gubernatorial election was held on November 2, 1920. Republican nominee Albert O. Brown defeated Democratic nominee Charles E. Tilton with 59.59% of the vote.

== General election ==
=== Candidates ===
Major party candidates

- Albert O. Brown, Republican
- Charles E. Tilton, Democratic

Other candidates

- Frank T. Butler, Socialist

=== Results ===
1920 New Hampshire gubernatorial election
| Party | Candidate | Votes | % | ±% |
|---|---|---|---|---|
| Republican | Albert O. Brown | 93,273 | 59.59% | |
| Democratic | Charles E. Tilton | 62,174 | 39.72% | |
| Socialist | Frank T. Butler | 1,080 | 0.69% | |
| Majority | | 31,099 | | |
| Turnout | | | | |
| Republican hold | | Swing | | |
