= Governor Bartlett =

Governor Bartlett may refer to:

- Dewey F. Bartlett (1919–1979), 19th Governor of Oklahoma
- John H. Bartlett (1869–1952), 57th Governor of New Hampshire
- Josiah Bartlett (1729–1795), 4th Governor of New Hampshire
- Washington Bartlett (1824–1887), 16th Governor of California

== See also ==
- Josiah Bartlet, fictional former Governor of New Hampshire on the TV series, The West Wing
