= Chuck Grassie =

American politician

Member of the New Hampshire House of Representatives from the Strafford 8th district
- In office March 8, 2023 – December 4, 2024

Member of the New Hampshire House of Representatives from the Strafford 11th district
- In office 2015 – December 7, 2022

Personal details
- Party: Democratic

Chuck Grassie is an American politician. He serves as a Democratic member for the Strafford 8th of the New Hampshire House of Representatives.

Originally elected to represent Strafford's 11th district, Grassie ran for the 8th district in 2022 after redistricting but the election resulted in a tie. Grassie subsequently won a "redo" special election that was held on February 23, 2023.

Grassie lost reelection to Republican David Walker in 2024.

In 2025, Grassie was elected mayor of Rochester. Grassie received 38% of the vote in a four-way race.
