= 1926 New Hampshire gubernatorial election =

- November 2, 1926
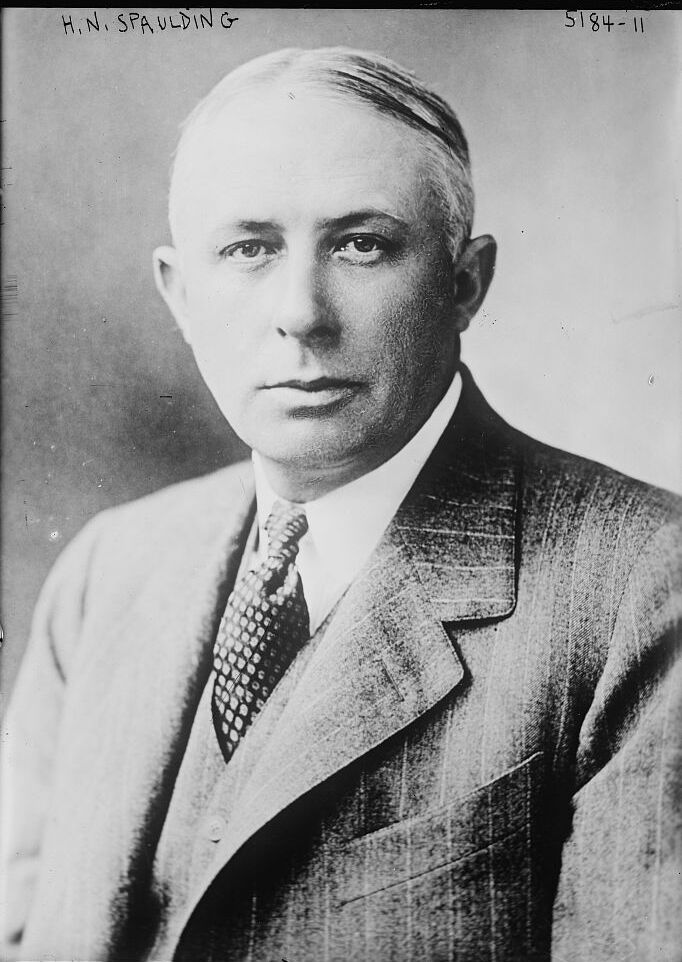

Nominee	Huntley N. Spaulding	Eaton D. Sargent
Party	Republican	Democratic
Popular vote	77,394	52,236
Percentage	59.70%	40.30%
- Spaulding: 50–60% 60–70% 70–80% 80–90% >90% Sargent: 50–60% 60–70% 70–80%
Governor before election
John Gilbert Winant
Republican
Elected Governor
Huntley N. Spaulding
Republican

The 1926 New Hampshire gubernatorial election was held on November 2, 1926. Republican nominee Huntley N. Spaulding defeated Democratic nominee Eaton D. Sargent with 59.70% of the vote.

== Primary elections ==
Primary elections were held on September 7, 1926.

=== Republican primary ===
==== Candidates ====
- Huntley N. Spaulding, President of the New Hampshire State Board of Education
- John Gilbert Winant, incumbent Governor

==== Results ====
Republican primary results
Party	Candidate	Votes	%
Republican	Huntley N. Spaulding	30,901	54.77
Republican	John Gilbert Winant (incumbent)	25,522	45.23
Total votes		56,423	100.00

== General election ==
=== Candidates ===
- Huntley N. Spaulding, Republican
- Eaton D. Sargent, Democratic

=== Results ===
1926 New Hampshire gubernatorial election
Party	Candidate	Votes	%	±%
Republican	Huntley N. Spaulding	77,394	59.70%	
Democratic	Eaton D. Sargent	52,236	40.30%	
Majority		25,158		
Turnout				
Republican hold		Swing		
