= 1924 United States Senate election in New Hampshire =

- November 4, 1924
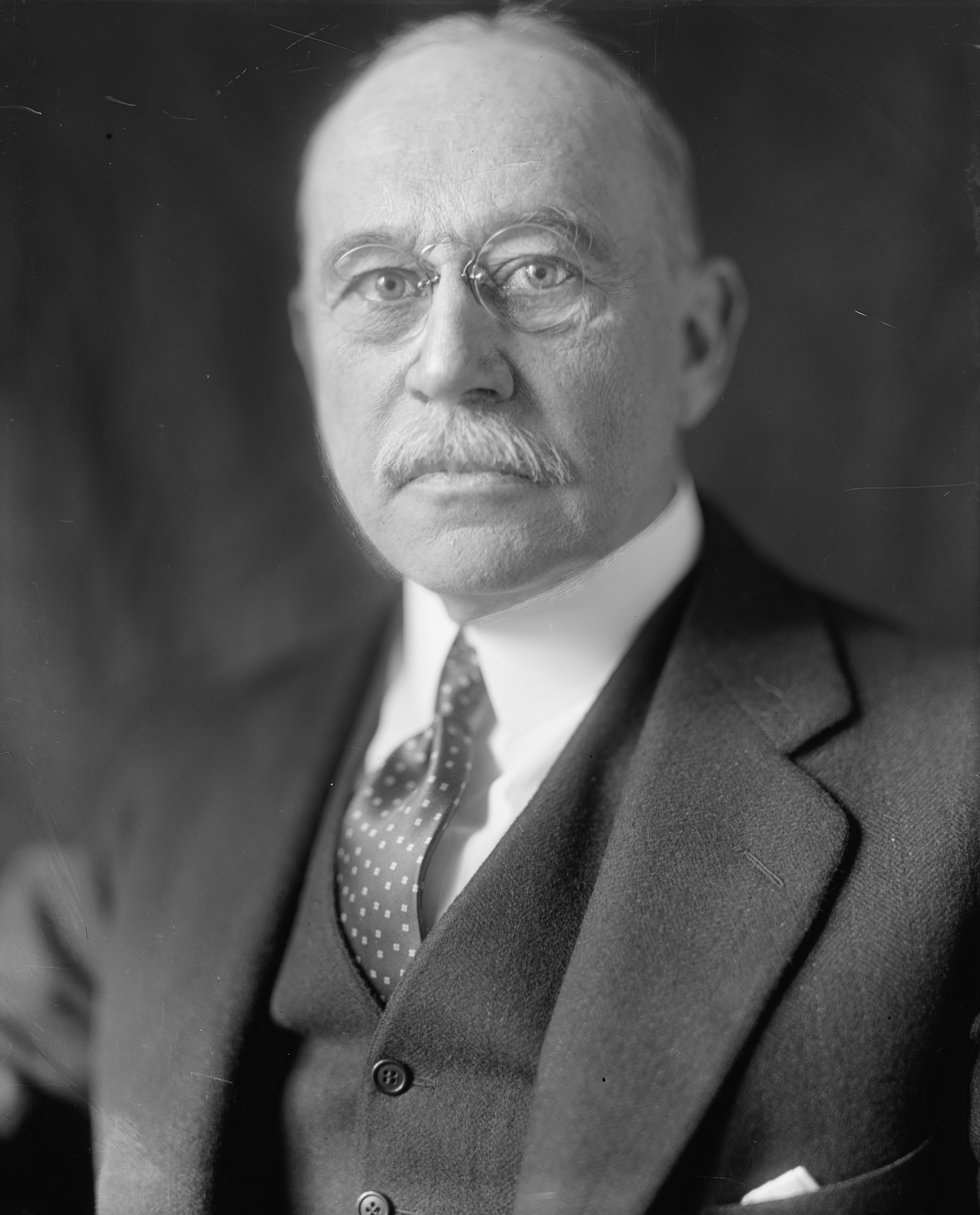

Nominee	Henry W. Keyes	George Farrand
Party	Republican	Democratic
Popular vote	94,432	63,596
Percentage	59.76%	40.24%
- Keyes: 50–60% 60–70% 70–80% 80–90% >90% Farrand: 50–60% 60–70% 70–80%
U.S. senator before election
Henry W. Keyes
Republican
Elected U.S. Senator
Henry W. Keyes
Republican

The 1924 United States Senate election in New Hampshire was held on November 4, 1924. Incumbent Republican Senator Henry W. Keyes ran for re-election to a second term. He faced no opposition in the primary, and was challenged by State Treasurer George Farrand, the Democratic nominee, in the general election. Keyes won re-election to his second term in a landslide as President Calvin Coolidge won the state convincingly in the presidential election.

== Democratic primary ==
=== Candidates ===
- George E. Farrand, State Treasurer

=== Results ===
Democratic primary results
Party	Candidate	Votes	%
Democratic	George E. Ferrand	8,282	100.00%
Total votes		8,282	100.00%

== Republican primary ==
=== Candidates ===
- Henry W. Keyes, incumbent U.S. Senator

=== Results ===
Republican primary results
Party	Candidate	Votes	%
Republican	Henry W. Keyes (inc.)	31,373	100.00%
Total votes		31,373	100.00%

== General election ==
=== Results ===
1924 United States Senate election in New Hampshire
Party	Candidate	Votes	%	±%
Republican	Henry W. Keyes (inc.)	94,432	59.76%	+6.20%
Democratic	George E. Ferrand	63,596	40.24%	−6.20%
Majority		30,836	19.51%	+12.40%
Total votes		158,028	100.00%	
Republican hold				
