= 1918 United States Senate election in New Hampshire =

- November 5, 1918
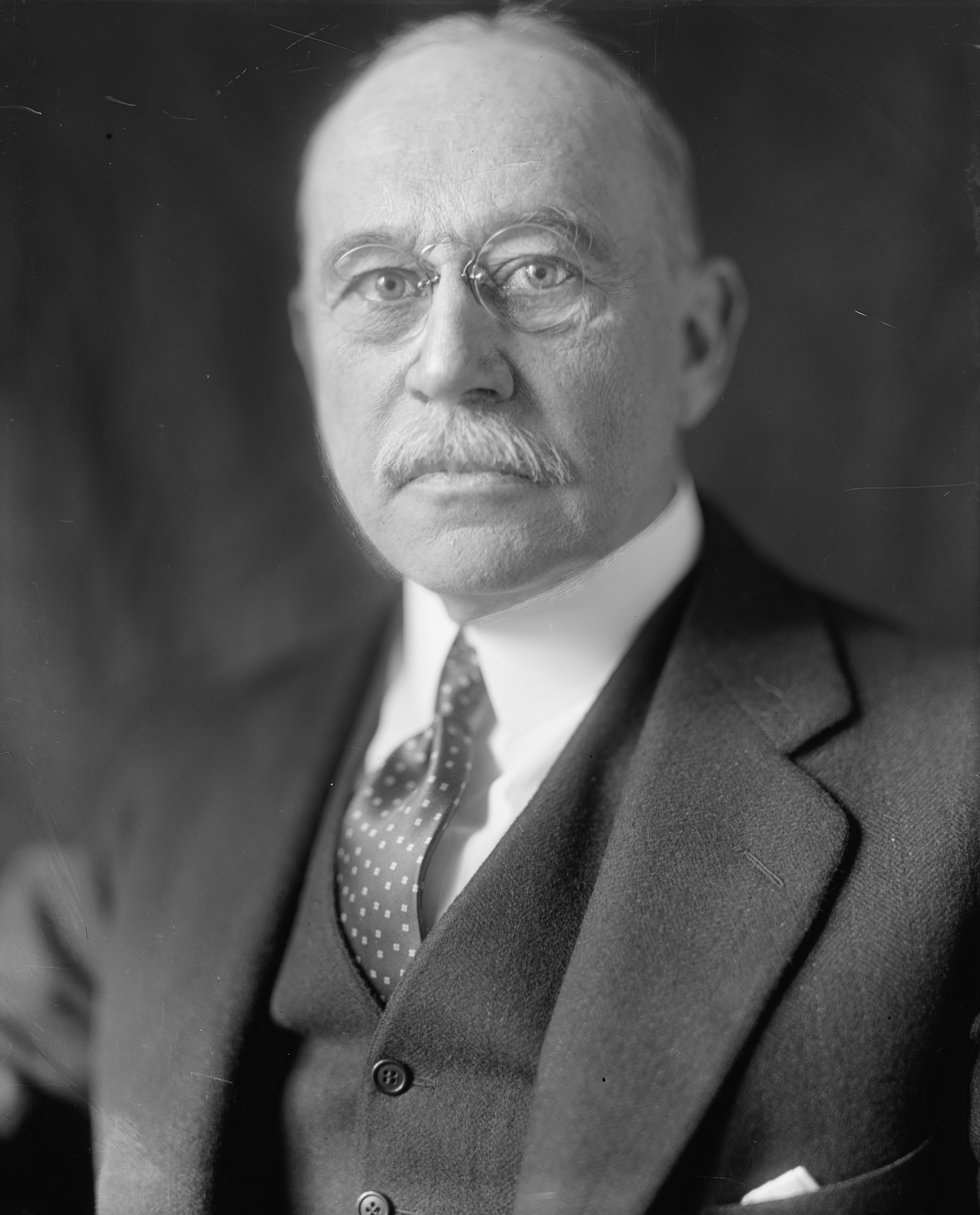

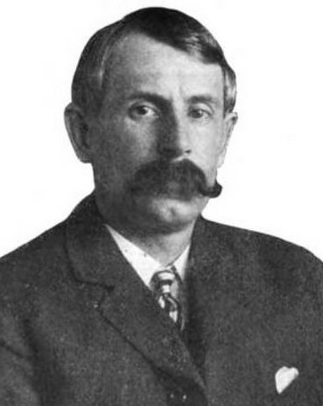
Nominee	Henry W. Keyes	Eugene E. Reed
Party	Republican	Democratic
Popular vote	37,783	32,783
Percentage	53.54%	46.46%
- Keyes: 50–60% 60–70% 70–80% 80–90% >90% Reed: 50–60% 60–70% 70–80% Tie: 50%
U.S. senator before election
Henry F. Hollis
Democratic
Elected U.S. senator
Henry W. Keyes
Republican

The 1918 United States Senate election in New Hampshire was held on November 5, 1918. Incumbent Democratic U.S. Senator Henry F. Hollis declined to run for re-election. Governor Henry W. Keyes narrowly won the Republican primary over former Governor Rolland H. Spaulding and faced former U.S. Representative Eugene E. Reed, the Democratic nominee, in the general election. Keyes ultimately defeated Reed, winning the first of his three terms in the U.S. Senate.

== Democratic primary ==
=== Candidates ===
- Eugene E. Reed, former U.S. Representative from New Hampshire's 1st congressional district
- Albert W. Noone, Peterborough manufacturer, 1914 Democratic nominee for Governor

=== Results ===
Democratic primary results
Party	Candidate	Votes	%
Democratic	Eugene E. Reed	3,518	66.09%
Democratic	Albert W. Noone	1,760	33.06%
Democratic	Write-ins	45	0.85%
Total votes		5,323	100.00%

== Republican primary ==
=== Candidates ===
- Henry W. Keyes, Governor of New Hampshire
- Rolland H. Spaulding, former Governor of New Hampshire
- Rosecrans W. Pillsbury, Manchester newspaper publisher

=== Results ===
Republican primary results
Party	Candidate	Votes	%
Republican	Henry W. Keyes	8,320	43.33%
Republican	Rolland H. Spaulding	8,028	41.81%
Republican	Rosecrans W. Pillsbury	2,845	14.82%
Republican	Write-ins	7	0.04%
Total votes		19,200	100.00%

== General election ==
=== Results ===
1918 United States Senate election in New Hampshire
Party	Candidate	Votes	%
Republican	Henry W. Keyes	37,783	53.55%
Democratic	Eugene E. Reed	32,763	46.44%
Write-in		5	0.01%
Total votes		70,551	100.00%
Republican gain from Democratic			
