= Elaine Lauterborn =

American politician

Member of New Hampshire House of Representatives
- In office 2008–2010

Personal details
- Party: Democratic

Elaine M. Lauterborn is an American politician. She was a member of the New Hampshire House of Representatives from 2008 to 2010. She was also deputy mayor and mayor of Rochester, New Hampshire. She was a long serving city councillor. In the 2018 New Hampshire House of Representatives election, she was a candidate in Strafford 9 but was defeated in the general election by Steven Beaudoin. She endorsed the Amy Klobuchar 2020 presidential campaign.

== See also ==
- List of mayors of Rochester, New Hampshire
