= 1962 New Hampshire gubernatorial election =

- November 6, 1962
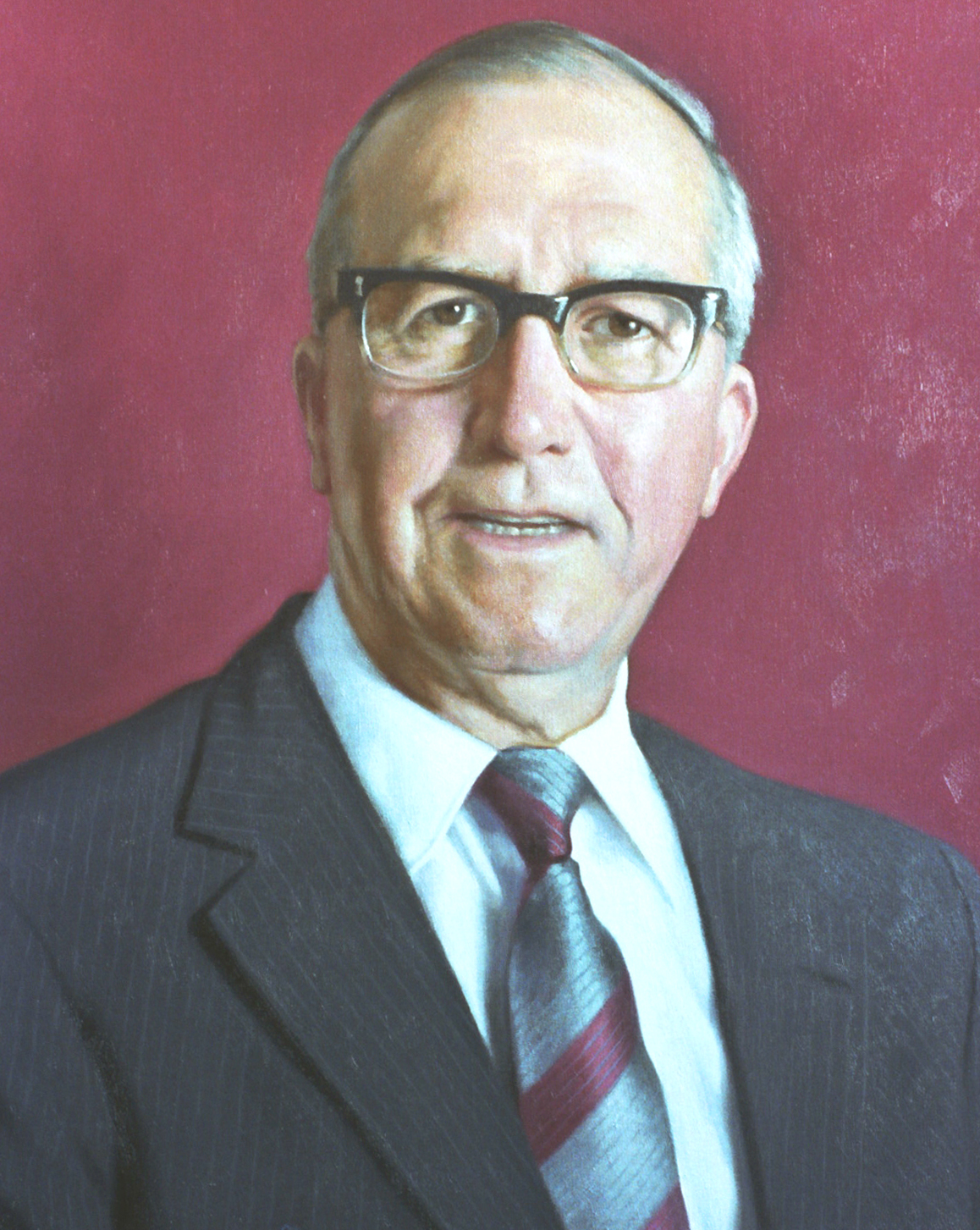

Nominee	John W. King	John Pillsbury
Party	Democratic	Republican
Popular vote	135,481	94,567
Percentage	58.89%	41.11%
- King: 50–60% 60–70% 70–80% 80–90% Pillsbury: 50–60% 60–70% 70–80% 80–90% >90% Tie: 50%
Governor before election
Wesley Powell
Republican
Elected Governor
John W. King
Democratic

The 1962 New Hampshire gubernatorial election was held on November 6, 1962. Democratic nominee John W. King defeated Republican nominee John Pillsbury with 58.89% of the vote. This was the first time since 1922 that a Democrat was elected Governor of New Hampshire.

== Primary elections ==
Primary elections were held on September 11, 1962.

=== Candidates ===
- John W. King, State Representative
- Elmer E. Bussey

=== Results ===
Democratic primary results
Party	Candidate	Votes	%
Democratic	John W. King	27,933	93.20
Democratic	Elmer E. Bussey	2,039	6.80
Total votes		29,972	100.00

=== Republican primary ===
==== Candidates ====
- John Pillsbury
- Wesley Powell, incumbent Governor
- Walter L. Koenig

==== Results ====
Republican primary results
Party	Candidate	Votes	%
Republican	John Pillsbury	55,784	56.39
Republican	Wesley Powell (incumbent)	42,005	42.46
Republican	Walter L. Koenig	1,145	1.16
Total votes		98,934	100.00

== General election ==
=== Candidates ===
- John W. King, Democratic
- John Pillsbury, Republican

=== Results ===
1962 New Hampshire gubernatorial election
Party	Candidate	Votes	%	±%
Democratic	John W. King	135,481	58.89%	
Republican	John Pillsbury	94,567	41.11%	
Majority		40,914		
Turnout		230,048		
Democratic gain from Republican		Swing		
