= Coe-Brown Northwood Academy =

Coordinates: 43°13′05″N 71°12′41″W

- Northwood, NH; USA

Information
- Type: Public Academy
- Motto: none
- Established: 1867
- Headmaster: David S. Smith
- Teaching staff: 60.00 (FTE)
- Enrollment: 666 (2023–2024)
- Student to teacher ratio: 11.10
- Campus: Open campus with five buildings, one tunnel, multiple playing fields, courts, track
- Colors: Red and white
- Athletics: 15 Interscholastic Sports; 24 Interscholastic Teams
- Mascot: Benny Bear
- Team name: Bears
- Website: www.coebrown.org

Coe-Brown Northwood Academy (CBNA) is a comprehensive secondary institution in Northwood, New Hampshire, United States. It serves all students from the towns of Strafford, Nottingham and Northwood.

== History ==
Coe-Brown Northwood Academy was founded in 1867 as a small private academy after veterans from the Civil War had pushed for the creation of a high school in Northwood. Shares were sold to 200 shareholders at $10.00. The shareholders originally owned the academy. Another high school in Northwood, the Northwood Seminary, was created in the same year. The first headmaster of Northwood Academy was the Reverend Eliot Cogswell.

The Board of Trustees of the academy was created in 1875 to manage the academy and take pressure off the shareholders. The academy was renamed Coe's Northwood Academy to honor the Coe family who donated land, money, houses, and woodlots to the academy and also paid to build a new office building.

In 1887 the school was given the deed to the Northwood Congregational Church (now located on campus) as well as another building and moved that building into what is now the teacher parking lot and named it Soper Hall. In 1901 the town of Northwood began paying tuition for students. In 1906 central heating and water systems were installed in the school. In 1926, electricity replaced the corroded gas lights.

Albert O. Brown (governor of New Hampshire from 1921 to 1923) was a great benefactor for the academy, and in 1939 the board of trustees renamed the academy Coe-Brown Northwood Academy in his honor. Since then, six additions and new buildings have been erected, Smith Hall and the Smith Hall Gymnasium (both across campus from the original building), Pinkham Hall, Wiggin Hall, the Gerrish Gym, and Soper Hall, which has since been demolished. Plans that were in place to build an arts center have recently been fulfilled (2021) and is located in close proximity to the “Science Building.” Fine arts including band and chorus take place in this new development. Extra parking was also acquired for teachers in the rear and side of the building. There will also be plans to build another field in the destroyed field next to Smith Hall and will probably be completed by 2017.

Coe-Brown Northwood Academy is now officially a "public academy" approved by the State of New Hampshire and accredited by New England Association of Schools & Colleges.

The National Center for Education Statistics classifies Coe-Brown Northwood as a public school.

== Characteristics ==
The school has characteristics of both a public and a private institution. Like a private school, it is run by an independent board of directors and paid for through student tuition. It is directed by a headmaster rather than a principal, and has somewhat of the campus feel common in private schools. Unlike most private schools, however, nearly all of the students are local, and most have their tuition paid and are accepted through contracts with local towns. The academic curriculum is also more on par with local public high schools. Coe-Brown Northwood Academy is officially recognized by the State of New Hampshire as a "public academy." This is a special identification given to two schools in the state.

== Admissions ==
Coe-Brown has contracts with Northwood and Strafford to be the high school for all residents of those two towns. Consequently, students who live in or move into those towns will automatically become Coe-Brown students, barring very unusual circumstances. Students who reside in Deerfield, Nottingham or Barrington may apply to come on a competitive basis, as may students from any other town within reasonable commuting distance. Nottingham and Barrington will pay the difference between CBNA's tuition and their local high school's tuition, whereas other towns which have their own high schools or contracts with area high schools would require a parent to pay private tuition to Coe-Brown. No transportation is provided by towns other than Northwood, Nottingham and Strafford.

== Clubs and sports ==
Coe-Brown Northwood Academy is home to a large variety of ever-changing sports and clubs. Some of the sports include:

- Boys' and girls' soccer
- Boys' and girls' lacrosse
- Boys' and girls' basketball
- Baseball
- Softball
- Bowling
- Volleyball
- Track & Field
- Cross Country
- Winter Track & Field
- Tennis
- Golf
- Lacrosse
- RECF Robotics Team
- E-sports Team

There is also a group of clubs that grows and changes every year, such as (but not limited to)

- Math Team
- Paragon (literary art magazine)
- Creative Writing Club
- Writing Center
- Pep Band
- National Honors Society
- National Art Honors Society
- Theatre
- Robotics
- Spanish Honors Society
- French Honors Society
- Latin Honors Society
- National English Honors Society
- Film Club

Former Clubs

- Juggling (end 2026 following the graduation of its sole member)

== Buildings ==
Coe-Brown's campus includes 5 buildings, which include:

- Main Building, a large building that includes English classes, as well as technology, world language and drama.
- Pinkham Hall, a small extension of the main building where the original one-room schoolhouse stood. It has the Headmaster's office, office, history classes and counseling.
- Science Building, a building where the science classes are held, as well as the cafeteria on the bottom floor.
- Wiggin Hall, a newly renovated building that has a variety of classes. It is connected to the music classes
- Smith Hall, another large building across the street. Math classes are held, along with gym, woodcraft, automotive, health, sports medicine and cooking classes.

Former building:

- Soper Hall, formerly a building on the far end of campus, by the church. It held some various classes, mainly study halls and special education. It also held the robotics training field before being abandoned, and then demolished in 2024

== Notable alumni ==
- Albert O. Brown, lawyer, banker, and Republican governor
- Ella Knowles Haskell, first woman to argue a case to the U.S. Supreme Court
- Sarah Stiles, singer and actress

== See also ==
- Pinkerton Academy - A privately incorporated, publicly funded school in New Hampshire

Connecticut private academies acting as public high schools:

- Gilbert School
- Norwich Free Academy
- Woodstock Academy

Private high schools in Maine which take students with public funds (from unorganized areas and/or with agreements with school districts):

- Foxcroft Academy
- Lee Academy
- Lincoln Academy
- George Stevens Academy
- Waynflete School
- Washington Academy
