= 1938 United States Senate election in New Hampshire =

- November 8, 1938
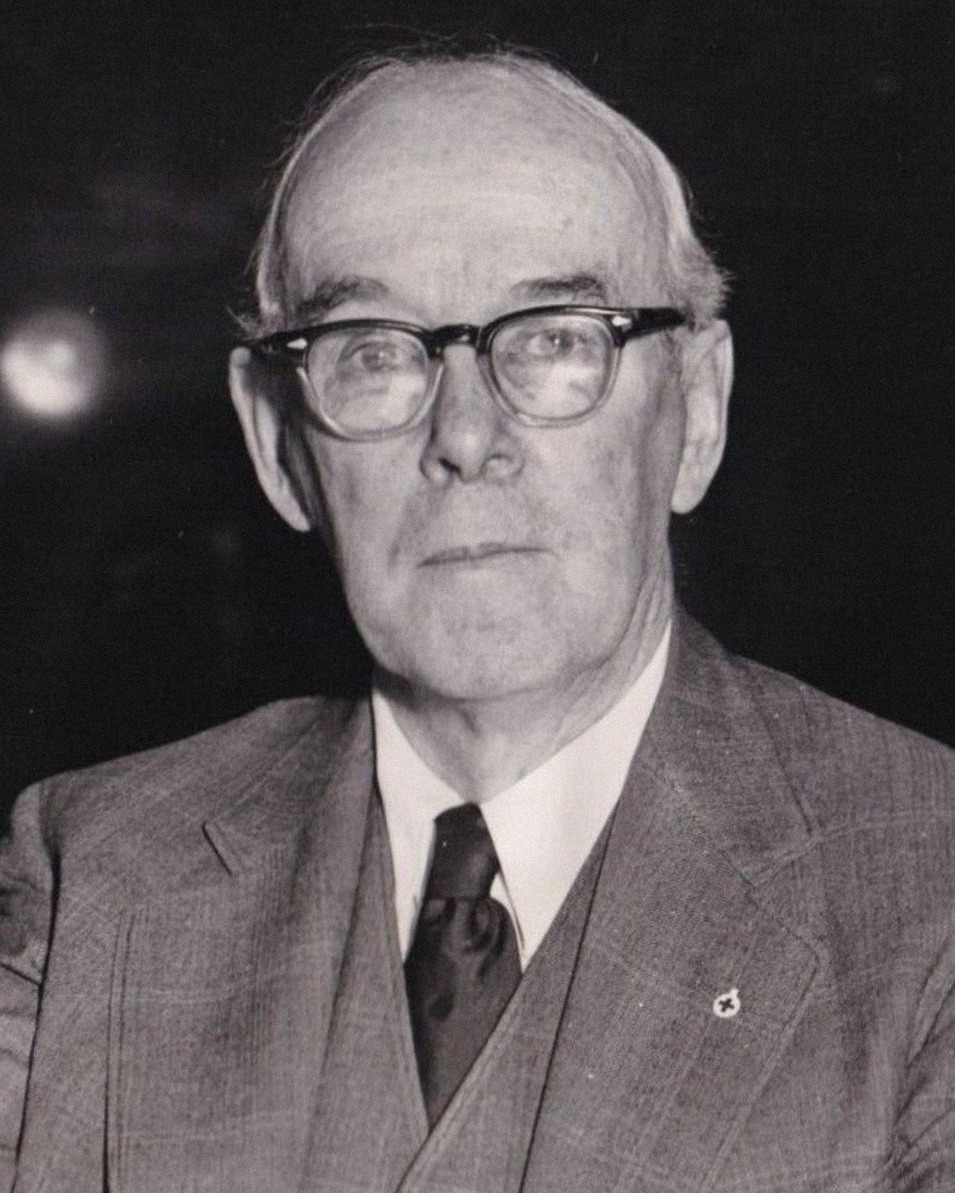

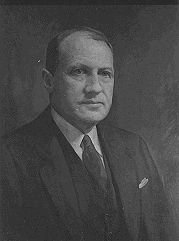
| Nominee | Charles W. Tobey | Fred H. Brown |
| Party | Republican | Democratic |
| Popular vote | 100,633 | 84,920 |
| Percentage | 54.23% | 45.77% |
- Tobey: 50–60% 60–70% 70–80% 80–90% >90% Brown: 50–60% 60–70% 80–90%
Senator before election
Fred H. Brown
Democratic
Elected Senator
Charles W. Tobey
Republican

The 1938 United States Senate election in New Hampshire took place on November 8, 1938. Incumbent Democratic Senator Fred H. Brown ran for re-election to a second term but was defeated by Republican U.S. Representative and former governor Charles W. Tobey.

== Background ==
Fred H. Brown was elected to the United States Senate in 1932 by narrowly unseating incumbent Republican George H. Moses. As Senator, Brown was an ardent and active supporter of the New Deal programs of President Franklin D. Roosevelt, serving on the Joint Committee on the Tennessee Valley Authority and voting to confirm Hugo Black to the United States Supreme Court.

== Democratic primary ==
=== Candidates ===
- Fred H. Brown, incumbent U.S. Senator since 1933

Senator Brown did not face an opponent for renomination.

== Republican primary ==
=== Candidates ===
- Charles W. Carroll, mayor of Laconia
- Eliot A. Carter, former State Senator from Nashua
- Charles W. Tobey, U.S. Representative from Manchester and former governor

=== Campaign ===
Tobey announced his campaign on April 12, joining a field which already included Laconia mayor Charles W. Carroll and Eliot A. Carter.

== General election ==
=== Candidates ===
- Fred H. Brown, incumbent Senator since 1933 (Democratic)
- Charles W. Tobey, U.S. Representative from Manchester and former governor (Republican)

=== Campaign ===
During the campaign, Tobey accused Brown of being a "Roosevelt yes-man", and Brown defended his support of the New Deal as in "the best interests" of New Hampshire.

As the campaign came to a close, both parties focused on Concord and the industrial cities of Manchester and Nashua.

=== Results ===
1938 U.S. Senate election in New Hampshire
| Party | Candidate | Votes | % | ±% |
|---|---|---|---|---|
| Republican | Charles W. Tobey | 100,633 | 54.23% | ▲4.96 |
| Democratic | Fred H. Brown (incumbent) | 84,920 | 45.77% | ▼4.58 |
| Total votes | | 217,057 | 100.00% | |
| Republican gain from Democratic | | Swing | | |

Following Brown's defeat and departure from office, President Roosevelt appointed him as the 2nd Comptroller General of the United States.
