= 1932 New Hampshire gubernatorial election =

- November 8, 1932
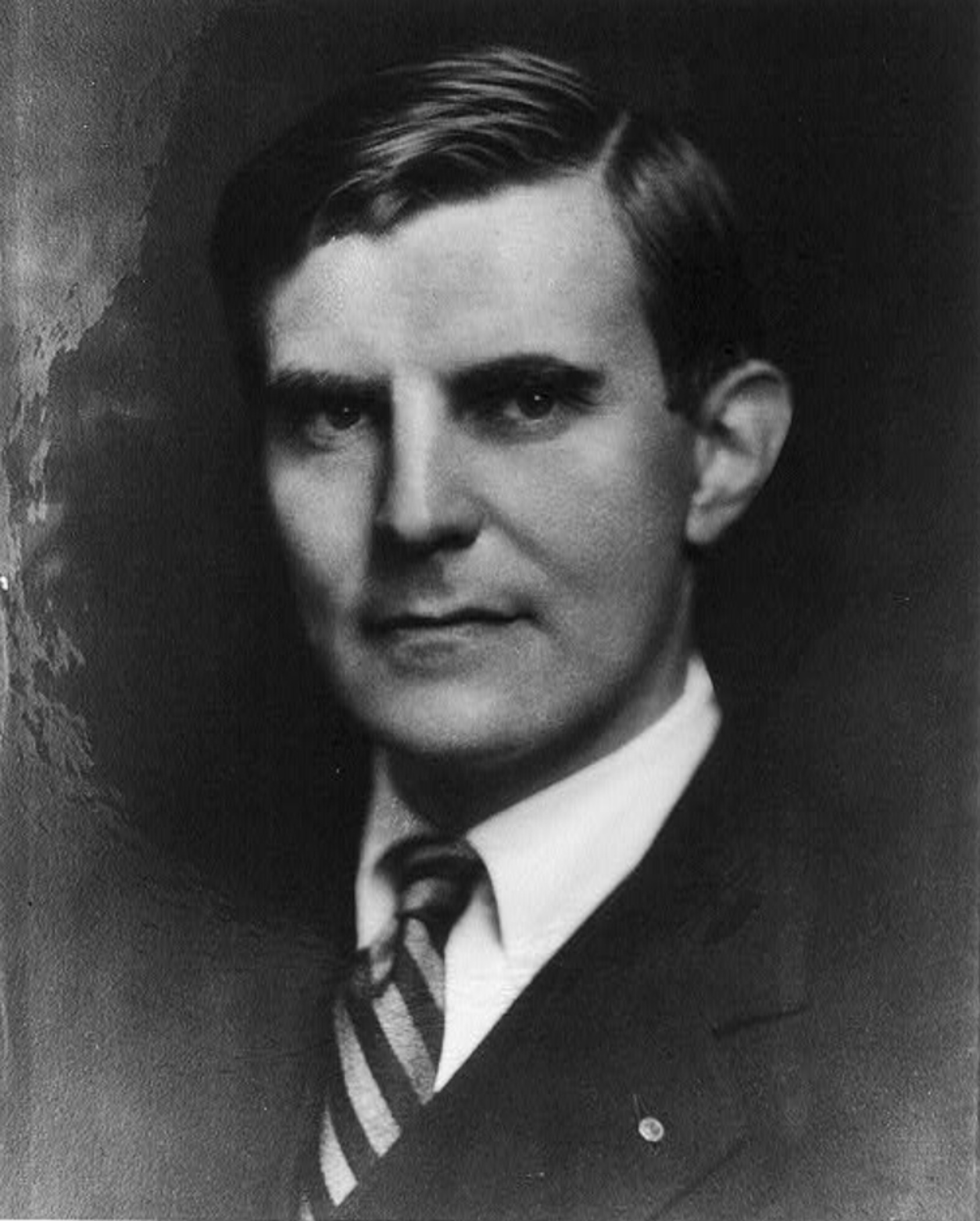

Nominee	John Gilbert Winant	Henri Ledoux
Party	Republican	Democratic
Popular vote	106,777	89,487
Percentage	54.20%	45.42%
- Winant: 40-50% 50–60% 60–70% 70–80% 80–90% >90% Ledoux: 50–60% 60–70% 70–80% 80–90% >90%
Governor before election
John Gilbert Winant
Republican
Elected Governor
John Gilbert Winant
Republican

The 1932 New Hampshire gubernatorial election was held on November 8, 1932. Incumbent Republican John Gilbert Winant defeated Democratic nominee Henri Ledoux with 54.20% of the vote.

== General election ==
=== Candidates ===
Major party candidates

- John Gilbert Winant, Republican
- Henri Ledoux, Democratic

Other candidates

- Frank T. Butler, Socialist
- William J. Wilgus Jr., Communist

=== Results ===
1932 New Hampshire gubernatorial election
Party	Candidate	Votes	%	±%
Republican	John Gilbert Winant (incumbent)	106,777	54.20%	
Democratic	Henri Ledoux	89,487	45.42%	
Socialist	Frank T. Butler	525	0.27%	
Communist	William J. Wilgus Jr.	235	0.12%	
Majority		17,290		
Turnout				
Republican hold		Swing		
