= Fred H. Brown =

American politician (1879–1955)

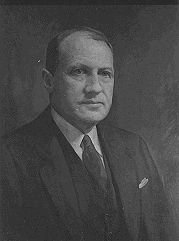

2nd Comptroller General of the United States
- In office April 11, 1939 – June 19, 1940
- President: Franklin D. Roosevelt
- Preceded by: John R. McCarl
- Succeeded by: Lindsay Carter Warren

United States Senator from New Hampshire
- In office March 4, 1933 – January 3, 1939
- Preceded by: George H. Moses
- Succeeded by: Charles W. Tobey

59th Governor of New Hampshire
- In office January 4, 1923 – January 1, 1925
- Preceded by: Albert O. Brown
- Succeeded by: John G. Winant

Personal details
- Born: April 12, 1879 Ossipee, New Hampshire, U.S.
- Died: February 3, 1955 (aged 75) Somersworth, New Hampshire, U.S.
- Party: Democratic
- Spouse: Edna McHarg
- Education: Dartmouth College; Boston University School of Law
- Baseball career
- Outfielder
- Batted: Right Threw: Right

MLB debut
- May 4, 1901, for the Boston Beaneaters

Last MLB appearance
- April 18, 1902, for the Boston Beaneaters

MLB statistics
- Batting average: .200
- Runs batted in: 2
- Stats at Baseball Reference

Teams
- Boston Beaneaters (1901–1902)

Fred Herbert Brown (April 12, 1879 – February 3, 1955) was an American lawyer, baseball player, and politician from New Hampshire. A member of the Democratic Party, Brown was the 59th governor of New Hampshire and a United States senator.

Brown attended Dartmouth College and played for the Boston Beaneaters of Major League Baseball’s National League in 1901 and 1902. He earned a law degree at Boston University and went into legal practice after he retired from baseball. Brown was elected mayor of Somersworth, New Hampshire, and appointed United States Attorney for the District of New Hampshire.

Brown was elected Governor in 1922, but was defeated for reelection in 1924. After serving on the Public Service Commission, he was elected to the Senate in 1932. He lost his reelection bid in 1938, and served as Comptroller General of the United States from 1939 to 1940, when he resigned due to poor health.

== Early life ==
Brown was born on April 12, 1879, to Dana and Nellie Brown in Ossipee, New Hampshire. He was an only child. Brown attended Dow Academy, and graduated in 1897. He played semi-professional baseball in Somersworth, New Hampshire, before he enrolled at Dartmouth College. He joined the Pi chapter of Delta Kappa Epsilon and played college baseball for the Dartmouth Big Green team as a catcher.

== Professional baseball career ==
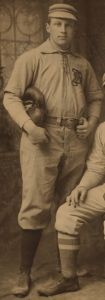
Fred Brown with the Boston Beaneaters

Frank Selee of the Boston Beaneaters, who played in the National League of Major League Baseball, signed Brown before the 1901 season. Brown made his major league debut on May 4, 1901, as a right fielder. He played in seven games for the Beaneaters in 1901, before he was demoted to the Providence Grays of the Class A Eastern League. He played in two games for the Beaneaters in 1902, and spent the majority of the 1902 season with Providence. He played nine games for the Beaneaters over the course of those two seasons, seven in the outfield, batting .200 (4-for-20) and not making an error in 10 chances in the field.

In 1903, Brown coached the Dartmouth Big Green, and played for Providence and the Jersey City Skeeters, also of the Eastern League. He played for the Haverhill Hustlers of the Class B New England League in 1904, and returned to Haverhill in 1905 and 1906. Brown suffered from pneumonia early in 1906, and was not at full strength even after he recovered. Haverhill released him during the season. Brown played baseball as a semi-professional in Somersworth in 1907.

== Political career ==
During his baseball career, Brown attended the Boston University School of Law in 1904 and 1905, earning a law degree. He moved to Somersworth in August 1906 to work in law for James A. Edgerly. He entered into a partnership with Edgerly, passed the bar examination in June 1907, and took over the practice after Edgerly's death. He served as city solicitor for Somersworth from 1908 to 1914. He was a presidential elector in the 1912 election and was elected mayor of Somersworth in March 1914. President Woodrow Wilson nominated Brown to be the United States Attorney for the District of New Hampshire in June 1914, and reappointed him in July 1918. Brown resigned in April 1922.

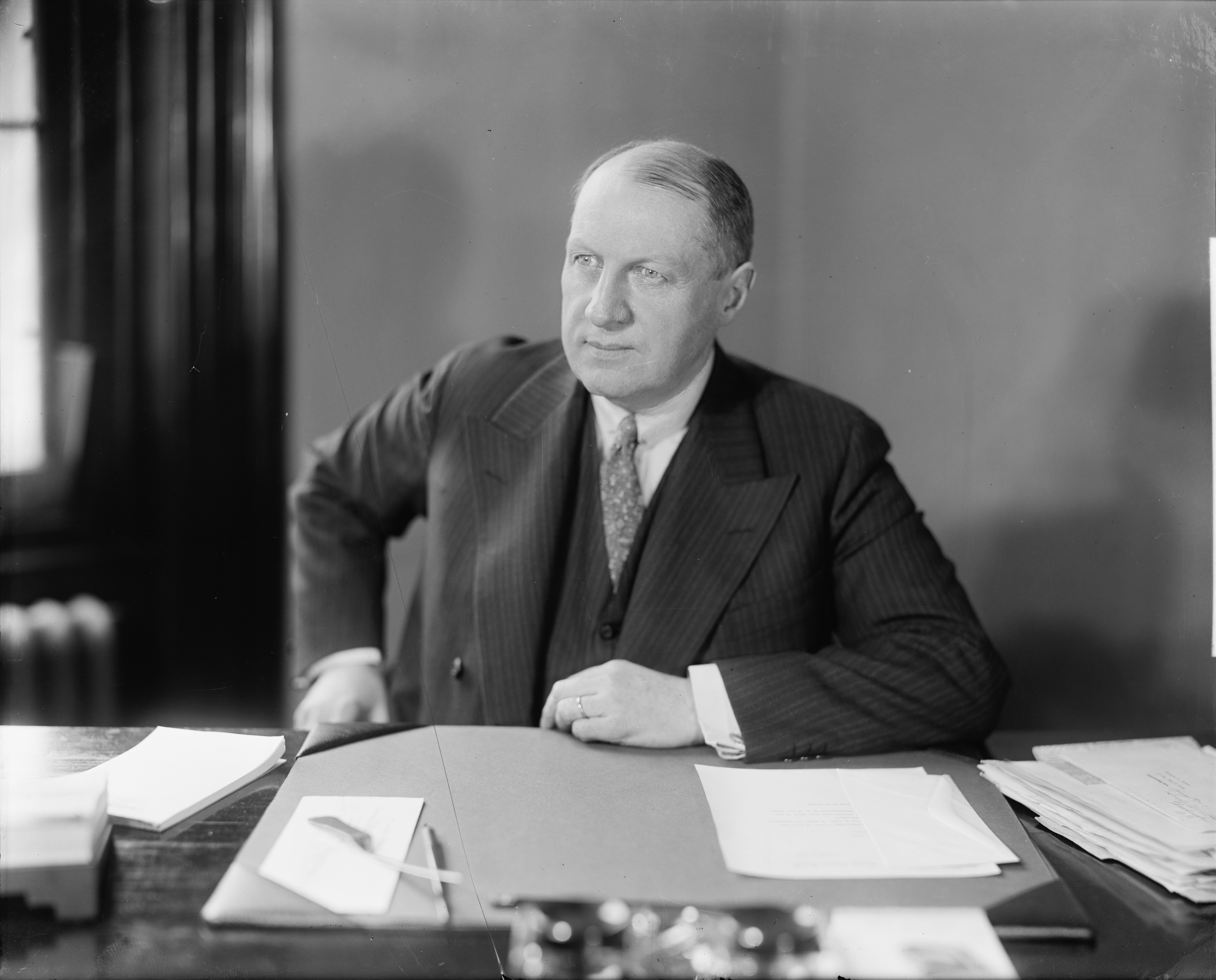
Brown as senator

=== Governor of New Hampshire 1923-1925 ===
Brown entered the 1922 election for Governor of New Hampshire. He faced two candidates in the Democratic Party primary election, and won. He defeated Republican Windsor H. Goodnow in the general election. As governor, he cut spending below the levels estimated by the New Hampshire Legislature and advocated for tax cuts. Brown was entered into nomination at the 1924 Democratic National Convention. He ran for reelection as governor in 1924, and he was renominated without opposition. He lost the general election to Republican John Gilbert Winant, while Republican Calvin Coolidge carried the state in the 1924 presidential election. After Winant took office in 1925, he nominated Brown for a six-year term on the New Hampshire Public Service Commission. He succeeded Thomas Worthen on the commission on June 1, 1925.

=== U. S. Senator from New Hampshire 1933-1939 ===
In January 1932, Democrats from Strafford County began to recruit Brown to enter the 1932 election for the United States Senate. He ran, facing two candidates in the Democratic primary election, and won. Brown defeated Republican incumbent George H. Moses in the general election, with the assistance of Franklin D. Roosevelt's landslide victory in the 1932 presidential election. In the Senate, Brown supported Roosevelt's New Deal, served on the joint committee that investigated the Tennessee Valley Authority, voted to confirm Hugo Black to the Supreme Court of the United States and chaired the Senate Commerce Committee's Subcommittee on Communications. Brown was not opposed when he ran for renomination in the 1938 election, but he lost in the general election to Republican Charles W. Tobey.

=== Comptroller General of the United States ===
Roosevelt appointed Brown to a 15-year term as Comptroller General of the United States in March 1939, and his nomination was approved in April. As comptroller general, he supported the decision to use marble from Vermont in the construction of the Jefferson Memorial and ruled that states could not collect taxes from the federal government. He also approved an $11 million contract ($254,605,263 in current dollar terms) for cement to use in the construction of the Shasta Dam.

Brown suffered a stroke in December 1939, and resigned as Comptroller General due to poor health in June 1940. The next month, Roosevelt nominated Brown to the United States Tariff Commission, and he was confirmed on August 1. He resigned the position in 1941. Brown remained in New Hampshire, where he met with President Harry S. Truman during his tour through New Hampshire during the 1952 presidential election.

== Personal life ==
Brown married Edna McHarg, who worked as a secretary in the New Hampshire State House, in May 1925. They did not have children.

Brown died from cardiac arrest in his home in Somersworth on February 3, 1955.

== See also ==
- List of American sportsperson-politicians

Legal offices
Preceded by Charles W. Hoitt	29th United States Attorney for the District of New Hampshire; 1914–1922	Succeeded by Raymond V. Smith
Party political offices
Preceded by Charles E. Tilton	Democratic nominee for Governor of New Hampshire; 1922, 1924	Succeeded by Eaton D. Sargent
Preceded by Robert C. Murchie	Democratic nominee for U.S. Senator from New Hampshire (Class 3); 1932, 1938	Succeeded by Joseph J. Betley
Political offices
Preceded by Albert O. Brown	Governor of New Hampshire; 1923–1925	Succeeded by John Winant
U.S. Senate
Preceded by George H. Moses	United States Senator (Class 3) from New Hampshire; 1933–1939	Succeeded by Charles W. Tobey
