= 1924 New Hampshire gubernatorial election =

- November 4, 1924
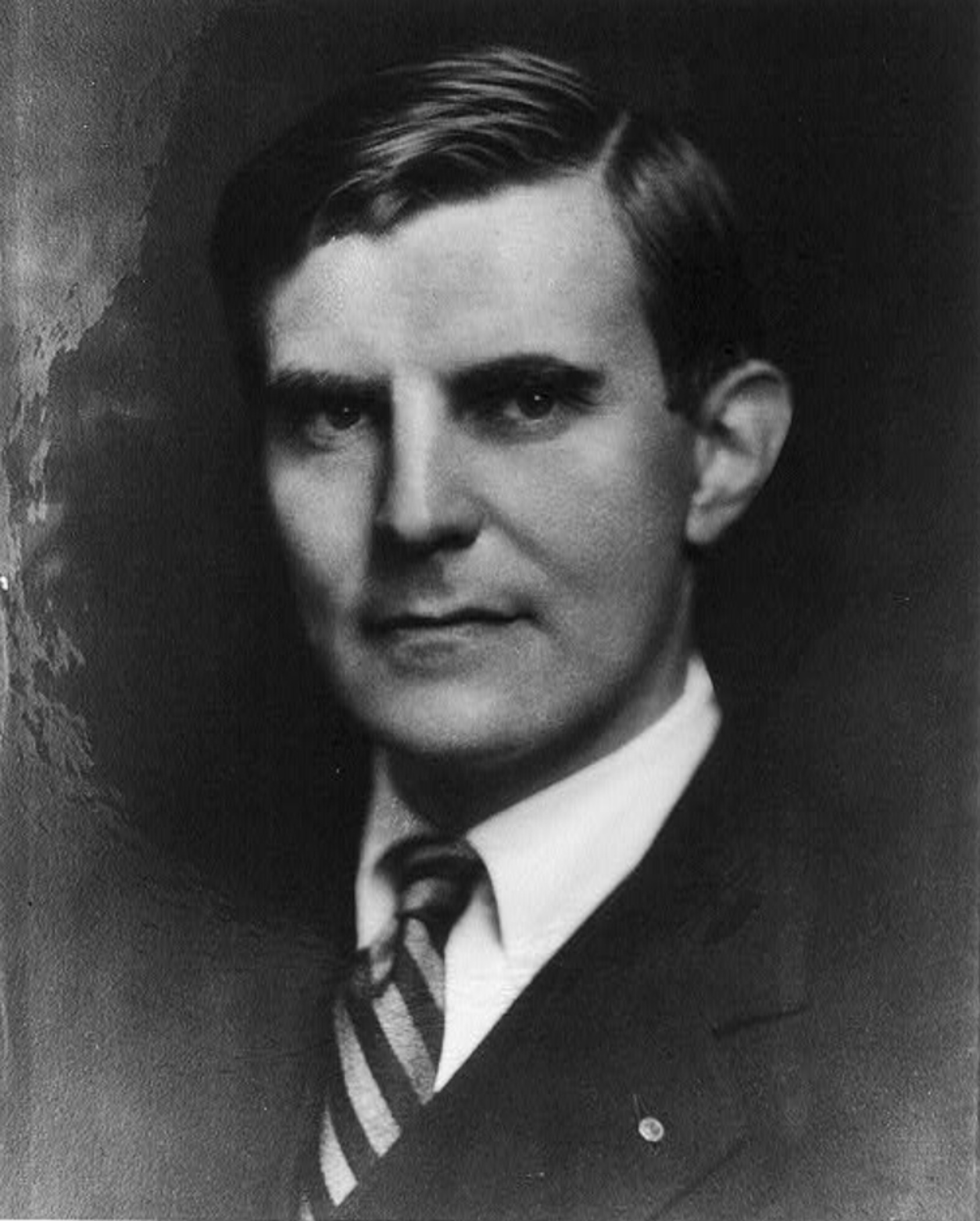

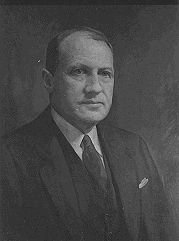
Nominee	John Gilbert Winant	Fred H. Brown
Party	Republican	Democratic
Popular vote	88,650	75,691
Percentage	53.94%	46.06%
- Winant: 50–60% 60–70% 70–80% 80–90% >90% Brown: 50–60% 60–70% 70–80% 80–90%
Governor before election
Fred H. Brown
Democratic
Elected Governor
John Gilbert Winant
Republican

The 1924 New Hampshire gubernatorial election was held on November 4, 1924. Republican nominee John Gilbert Winant defeated Democratic incumbent Fred H. Brown with 53.94% of the vote.

== General election ==
=== Candidates ===
- John Gilbert Winant, Republican
- Fred H. Brown, Democratic

=== Results ===
1924 New Hampshire gubernatorial election
Party	Candidate	Votes	%	±%
Republican	John Gilbert Winant	88,650	53.94%	
Democratic	Fred H. Brown (incumbent)	75,691	46.06%	
Majority		12,959		
Turnout				
Republican gain from Democratic		Swing		
