= Samuel D. Felker =

American politician (1859–1932)

Samuel Demeritt Felker
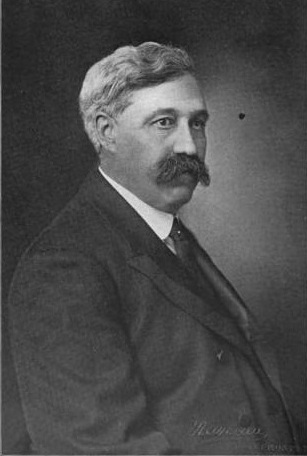

54th Governor of New Hampshire
- In office January 2, 1913 – January 1, 1915
- Preceded by: Robert P. Bass
- Succeeded by: Rolland H. Spaulding

Mayor of Rochester, New Hampshire
- In office 1896–1897

Member of the New Hampshire House of Representatives
- In office 1909–1911

Member of the New Hampshire Senate
- In office 1890–1892

Judge of the Rochester, N.H. Municipal Court
- In office July 20, 1915 – 1930

Personal details
- Born: April 16, 1859 Rochester, New Hampshire
- Died: November 14, 1932 (aged 73) Rochester, New Hampshire
- Party: Democratic
- Spouse: Mary J. Dudley (m. 1900)
- Education: Dartmouth College, 1882; Boston University School of Law, L.L.B., A.M., 1887
- Profession: Lawyer

Samuel Demeritt Felker (April 16, 1859 – November 14, 1932) was an American lawyer and Democratic politician from Rochester, New Hampshire.

== Family life ==
Felker was born to William H. and Deborah A. (Demeritt) Felker in Rochester, New Hampshire. Felker married Mary J. Dudley on June 26, 1900 in Buffalo, New York. Felker was a member of the Congregationalist Church.

== Education ==
Felker graduated from Dartmouth College in 1882. In 1888 Felker earned a A.M. and a L.L.B from the Boston University School of Law.

== Early political career ==
Felker was a member of the New Hampshire state constitutional convention of 1889, he served in the New Hampshire Senate from 1890 to 1892, as the mayor of Rochester, New Hampshire in 1896 and 1897, and from 1909 to 1911 in the New Hampshire House of Representatives.

== Governor of New Hampshire ==
In 1912, Felker, a political progressive, ran as a Democrat for governor of New Hampshire. Because no candidate received a majority of the vote, Felker was selected as governor by the New Hampshire legislature. He did not seek reelection in 1914 and, after deliberating, decided against a bid for the state's U.S. Senate seat.

== Judge of the Rochester Municipal Court ==
Felker's gubernatorial successor, Rolland H. Spaulding, appointed Felker as Judge of the Rochester Municipal Court, a position Felker held from July 20, 1915 until 1930.

== Death ==
Felker died at his home in Rochester on November 14, 1932.

== See also ==
- List of mayors of Rochester, New Hampshire

== Notes ==
Party political offices
Preceded by Clarence E. Carr	Democratic nominee for Governor of New Hampshire; 1912	Succeeded by Albert W. Noone
Political offices
Preceded by Robert P. Bass	Governor of New Hampshire; 1913–1915	Succeeded by Rolland H. Spaulding
