= Albert O. Brown =

American politician (1852–1937)

Albert Oscar Brown
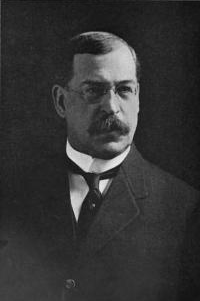

58th Governor of New Hampshire
- In office January 6, 1921 – January 4, 1923
- Preceded by: John H. Bartlett
- Succeeded by: Fred H. Brown

Personal details
- Born: July 18, 1852 Northwood, New Hampshire, U.S.
- Died: March 28, 1937 (aged 84) Manchester, New Hampshire, U.S.
- Party: Republican
- Spouse(s): Susie J. Clarke, m. December 30, 1888
- Profession: Lawyer

Albert Oscar Brown (July 18, 1852 – March 28, 1937) was an American lawyer, banker, and Republican politician from Manchester, New Hampshire.

== Biography ==
He was born on July 18, 1852, in Northwood, New Hampshire and graduated from Coe-Brown Northwood Academy in 1874. He graduated from Dartmouth College in 1878 and Boston University School of Law in 1884.

Brown married Susie J. Clarke in Ayer, Massachusetts, on December 30, 1888.

In 1905 Brown was elected the President of the Amoskeag Savings Bank to succeed Otis Barton.

In June 1911 Brown was elected by the alumni to be a trustee of Dartmouth College, serving until 1931.

Brown served a single term as Governor of New Hampshire from 1921 to 1923.

He died on March 28, 1937, in Manchester, New Hampshire.

== Corporate involvement ==
Brown was also a member of a number of corporate boards, including the Amoskeag Savings Bank.

Party political offices
Preceded by John H. Bartlett	Republican nominee for Governor of New Hampshire; 1920	Succeeded by Windsor H. Goodnow
Political offices
Preceded by John H. Bartlett	Governor of New Hampshire; 1921–1923	Succeeded by Fred H. Brown
Business positions
Preceded by Otis Barton	President of the Amoskeag Savings Bank; 1905–1912	Succeeded by Arthur M. Heard
