= List of mayors of Rochester, New Hampshire =

The following is a list of mayors of the city of Rochester, New Hampshire, USA.

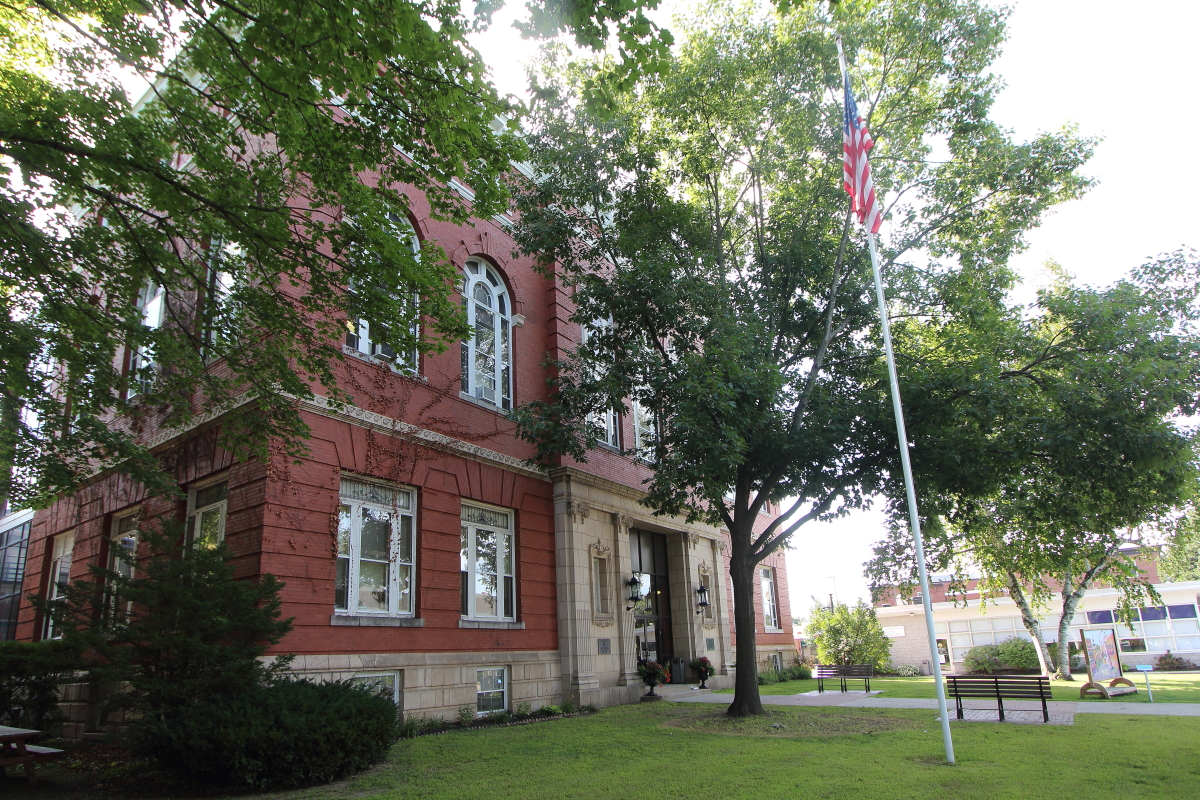
Rochester city hall building, New Hampshire, USA, in 2013

- Samuel D. Felker, 1896-1897
- W. G. Bradley, ca.1898-1901
- H.L. Worcester, ca.1901
- Charles W. Bickford, ca.1904
- Joseph Warren, ca.1909
- John Levi Meader, 1917
- James B. Young, ca.1917
- William K. Kimball, ca.1921
- Frederic E. Small, ca.1923
- William S. Davis, 1924
- Louis H. McDuffee, ca.1930
- John F. Conrad, ca.1937
- C. Wesley Lyons, ca.1947
- John Shaw, ca.1953-1954
- Royal H. Edgerly, ca.1966
- Douglas Lachance, 1998-2001
- David E. Walker, 2004-2005
- John Larochelle, 2006-2007
- T.J. Jean, ca.2011-2015
- Caroline McCarley, 2016-2021
- Elaine Lauterborn, 2021
- Paul Callaghan, 2022-2024

== See also ==
- Rochester history
