= 1912 New Hampshire gubernatorial election =

- November 5, 1912
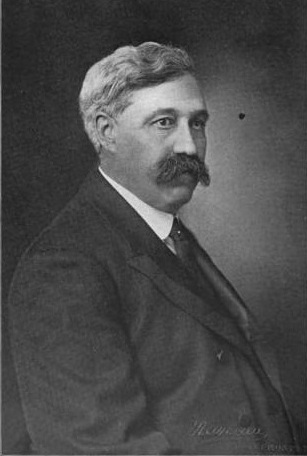

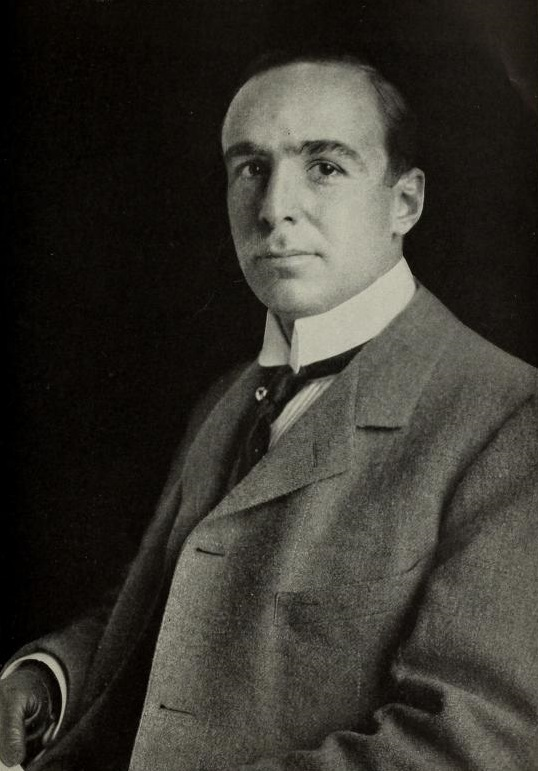
Nominee	Samuel D. Felker	Franklin Worcester	Winston Churchill
Party	Democratic	Republican	Progressive
Popular vote	34,203	32,504	14,401
Percentage	41.07%	39.03%	17.29%
- Felker: 30-40% 40-50% 50–60% 60–70% 70–80% 80–90% Worcester: 30-40% 40-50% 50–60% 60–70% 70–80% 80–90% Churchill: 30-40% 40-50% 50–60% 60–70% 70–80% Tie: 40-50% 50%
Governor before election
Robert P. Bass
Republican
Elected Governor
Samuel D. Felker
Democratic

The 1912 New Hampshire gubernatorial election was held on November 5, 1912. Democratic nominee Samuel D. Felker defeated Republican nominee Franklin Worcester with 41.07% of the vote.

Former president Theodore Roosevelt's Progressive Party did make a strong third-party showing and may have swung the election in disfavour of the Republican ticket. Notably, although not at the time, nominee Winston Churchill (a then-famous novelist) shared name with the British First Lord of the Admiralty, then a figure of national but not substantial international notoriety.

== General election ==
=== Candidates ===
Major party candidates

- Samuel D. Felker, Democratic
- Franklin Worcester, Republican

Other candidates

- Winston Churchill, Progressive
- William H. Wilkins, Socialist
- Alva H. Morrill, Prohibition

=== Results ===
1912 New Hampshire gubernatorial election
Party	Candidate	Votes	%	±%
Democratic	Samuel D. Felker	34,203	41.07%	
Republican	Franklin Worcester	32,504	39.03%	
Progressive	Winston Churchill	14,401	17.29%	
Socialist	William H. Wilkins	1,674	2.01%	
Prohibition	Alva H. Morrill	496	0.60%	
Majority		1,699		
Turnout				
Democratic gain from Republican		Swing		
