= 1930 New Hampshire gubernatorial election =

- November 4, 1930
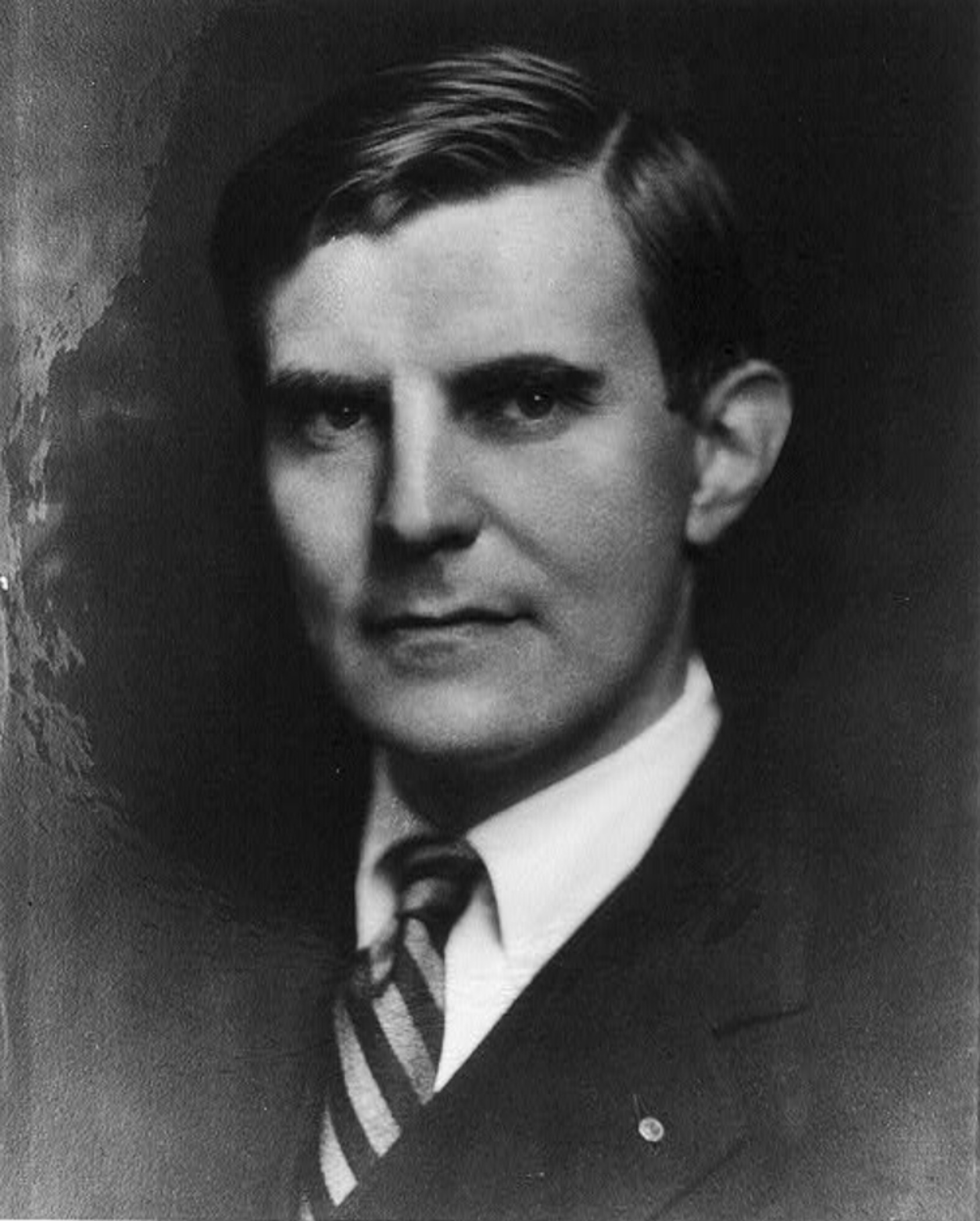

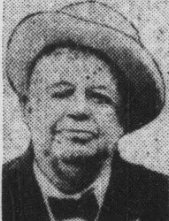
Nominee	John Gilbert Winant	Albert W. Noone
Party	Republican	Democratic
Popular vote	75,518	54,441
Percentage	57.98%	41.80%
- Winant: 50–60% 60–70% 70–80% 80–90% >90% Noone: 50–60% 60–70% 70–80% Tie: 50%
Governor before election
Charles W. Tobey
Republican
Elected Governor
John Gilbert Winant
Republican

The 1930 New Hampshire gubernatorial election was held on November 4, 1930. Republican nominee John Gilbert Winant defeated Democratic nominee Albert W. Noone with 57.98% of the vote.

== General election ==
=== Candidates ===
Major party candidates

- John Gilbert Winant, Republican
- Albert W. Noone, Democratic

Other candidates

- Fred B. Chase, Socialist

=== Results ===
1930 New Hampshire gubernatorial election
Party	Candidate	Votes	%	±%
Republican	John Gilbert Winant	75,518	57.98%	
Democratic	Albert W. Noone	54,441	41.80%	
Socialist	Fred B. Chase	288	0.22%	
Majority		21,077		
Turnout				
Republican hold		Swing		
