= Henry W. Keyes =

American politician (1863–1938)

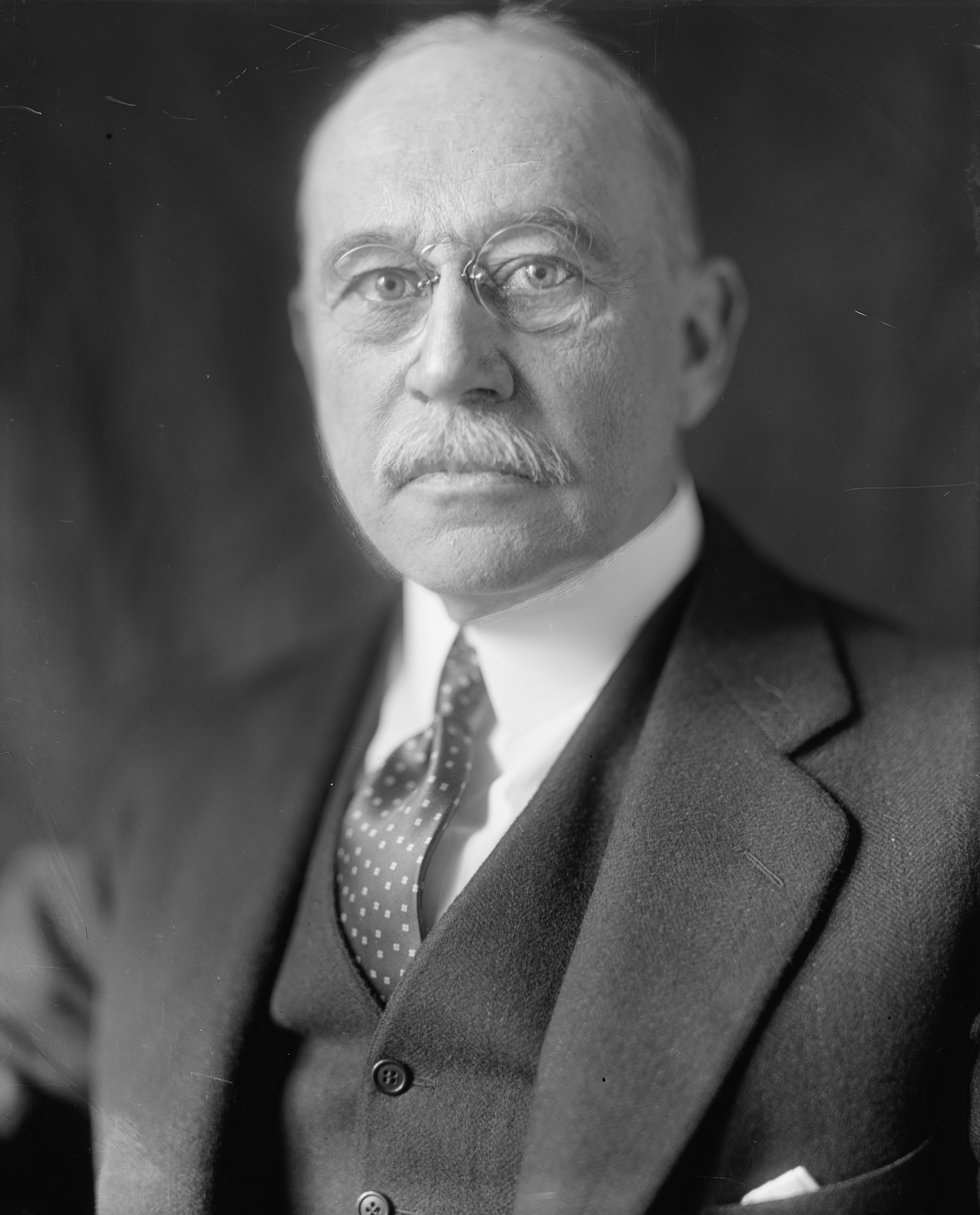
- Keyes in 1905

United States Senator from New Hampshire
- In office March 4, 1919 – January 3, 1937
- Preceded by: Henry F. Hollis
- Succeeded by: Styles Bridges

56th Governor of New Hampshire
- In office January 2, 1917 – January 6, 1919
- Preceded by: Rolland H. Spaulding
- Succeeded by: John H. Bartlett

Member of the New Hampshire Senate
- In office 1903–1905

Member of the New Hampshire House of Representatives
- In office 1891–1895; 1915–1917

Personal details
- Born: May 23, 1863 Newbury, Vermont, U.S.
- Died: June 19, 1938 (aged 75) Haverhill, New Hampshire, U.S.
- Party: Republican
- Education: Harvard University (BA)

Henry Wilder Keyes (/ˈkaɪz/; May 23, 1863 – June 19, 1938) was an American Republican politician from Haverhill, New Hampshire. He served as the 56th governor of New Hampshire from 1917 to 1919 and as a United States senator.

== Early life ==
Keyes was born in Newbury, Vermont on May 23, 1863. He was raised in New Hampshire, and his father was a prominent farmer, merchant, and railroad investor. Keyes graduated from Adams Academy and then attended Harvard University, from which he graduated in 1887.

He was the recipient of an honorary degree of Master of Arts from Dartmouth College and was also an honorary Bachelor of Science and LL.D. of the New Hampshire College of Agriculture and the Mechanic Arts (now the University of New Hampshire).

== Career ==
Keyes was a farmer and cattle breeder, and initiated raising of the Holstein-Friesian breed in the United States. He was also a founder of the Woodsville National Bank, and served as its president.

Keyes served in the New Hampshire House of Representatives from 1891 to 1895. He served in the New Hampshire State Senate from 1903 to 1905. He was treasurer of the State license commission from 1903 to 1915, and chairman of the State excise commission from 1915 to 1917. From 1915 to 1917 he served again in the state House of Representatives.

In 1916, he was elected Governor of New Hampshire, and he served one term, 1917 to 1919.

Keyes ran successfully for the United States Senate in 1918. He was reelected in 1924 and 1930 and served from March 4, 1919, to January 3, 1937. He did not seek another term in the 1936 election. As a senator, he was noted for not speaking on the floor, even nodding or shaking his head to vote "aye" or "nay." The one exception was his motion to adjourn during a long-winded speech by Senate Finance Committee Chairman Pat Harrison.

During his Senate career, Keyes served as chairman of: the Committee on Expenditures in the Post Office Department (Sixty-sixth Congress); Committee to Audit and Control the Contingent Expenses (Sixty-eighth and Sixty-ninth Congresses); and Committee on Public Buildings and Grounds (Seventieth through Seventy-second Congresses).

== Personal life ==
In 1904, Keyes married Frances Parkinson Wheeler, who, as Frances Parkinson Keyes, became a prolific author. He was forty, she was eighteen. They had three sons together—Henry Wilder Keyes, Jr., John Parkinson Keyes, and Francis Keyes.

Keyes died on June 19, 1938, in North Haverhill, New Hampshire, and is buried at the Oxbow Cemetery in Newbury, Vermont.

Party political offices
Preceded by Rolland H. Spaulding	Republican nominee for Governor of New Hampshire; 1916	Succeeded by John H. Bartlett
First	Republican nominee for U.S. Senator from New Hampshire (Class 2); 1918, 1924, 1930	Succeeded by Styles Bridges
Political offices
Preceded by Rolland H. Spaulding	Governor of New Hampshire; 1917–1919	Succeeded by John H. Bartlett
U.S. Senate
Preceded by Henry F. Hollis	United States Senator from New Hampshire; 1919–1937	Succeeded by H. Styles Bridges
