= Huntley N. Spaulding =

American politician (1869–1955)

Huntley Nowel Spaulding
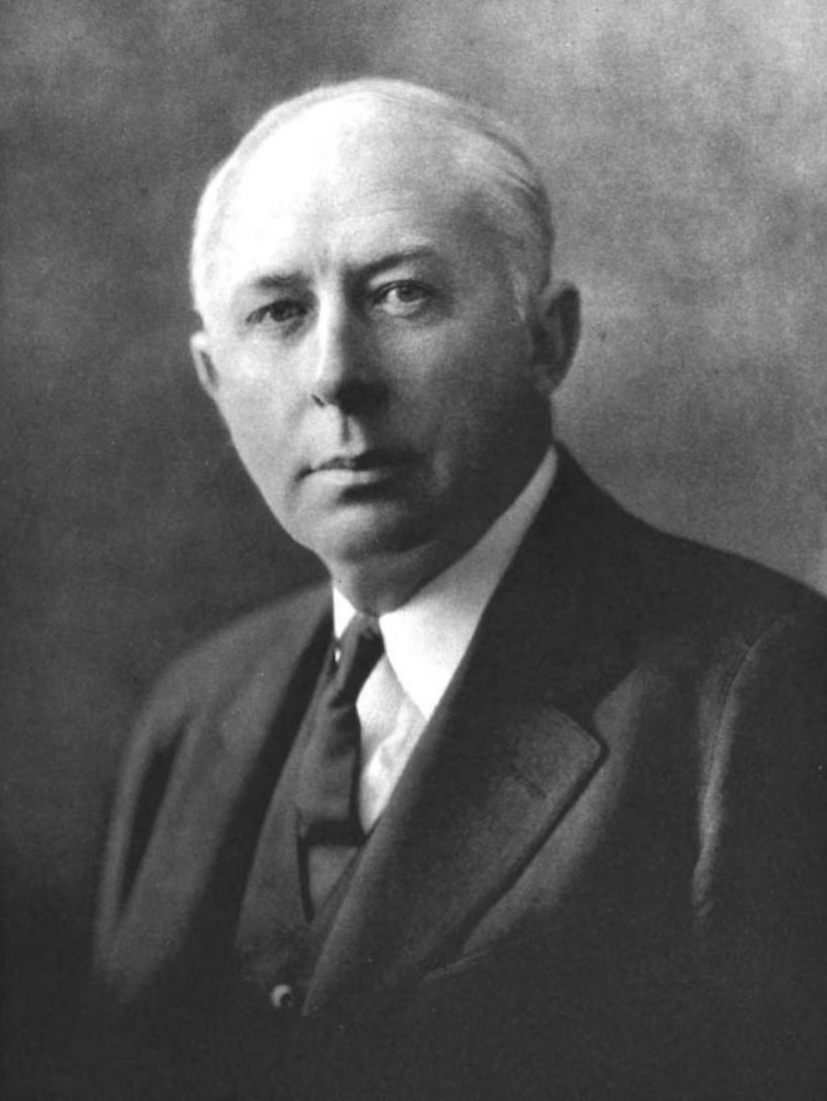

61st Governor of New Hampshire
- In office January 6, 1927 – January 3, 1929
- Preceded by: John Gilbert Winant
- Succeeded by: Charles W. Tobey

Personal details
- Born: October 30, 1869 Townsend, Massachusetts
- Died: November 14, 1955 (aged 86) Rochester, New Hampshire
- Party: Republican
- Spouse: Harriet Mason

Huntley Nowel Spaulding (October 30, 1869 – November 14, 1955) was an American manufacturer and Republican politician from Rochester, New Hampshire. He served as the 61st governor of New Hampshire from 1927 to 1929. In addition, he was notable for his philanthropy in health and education.

== Early life and education ==
Huntley Nowel Spaulding was born in Townsend Harbor, Massachusetts, in 1869, to Jonas Spaulding and his wife, Emeline Cummings. He was the second of three sons and a daughter Marion. His father and uncle, Waldo, had founded a leatherboard mill in the town, which was the start of their family-owned manufacturing business. The young Spaulding was educated at Lawrence Academy at Groton, class of 1885, and later Phillips Exeter Academy, class of 1889. The family later moved to North Rochester, New Hampshire, where their father Jonas opened another mill.

== Career ==
Spaulding and his two brothers, Leon and Rolland, worked into the family business of their father in J. Spaulding and Sons. They helped manage mills in New Hampshire, Massachusetts, and New York, but lived in New Hampshire all their lives.

Spaulding became active in the Republican Party in New Hampshire. He followed in the footsteps of his younger brother Roland, who had been elected governor in 1914. He was Chairman of the New Hampshire's Food Production Committee and New Hampshire's federal food administrator World War I. He also served as chairman of the European Relief Council, a private charity that worked with other charities and government agencies to raise millions of dollars to aid orphans and refugees following the war. From 1921 to 1926 he was President of the State Board of Education.

He was elected Governor of New Hampshire in 1926, and served one term, 1927 to 1929, before the Great Depression began.

The Spaulding Company was the major employer in Tonawanda, New York. After the death of their two brothers, Spaulding and his married sister Marion Potter designed a charitable trust for the Spaulding Company. It was to disburse all their assets within 15 years of the death of the last Spaulding sibling. Marion Spaulding Potter was the last survivor, living until 1957.

Huntley Spaulding was known for his philanthropy in the fields of health and education. He served as president of the boards of trustees of Lawrence Academy and Tufts University. He died at his home in Rochester, New Hampshire on November 14, 1955, and was buried at Mount Auburn Cemetery, Cambridge, Massachusetts.

== Legacy and honors ==
- 1944, the University of New Hampshire awarded Spaulding the Charles Holmes Pettee Memorial medal for distinguished service to his state and nation.
- The Spaulding Memorial School in Townsend was built in the 1920s in honor of the Spaulding brothers' parents.
- Spaulding Turnpike was named for Huntley N. Spaulding and his brother Rolland H. Spaulding. It connects their hometown of Rochester to I-95.
- The Spaulding brothers are featured on New Hampshire historical marker no. 42
- The competition arena for basketball and volleyball at Keene State College is named in his honor.

Party political offices
Preceded by John Gilbert Winant	Republican nominee for Governor of New Hampshire; 1926	Succeeded by Charles W. Tobey
Political offices
Preceded by John G. Winant	Governor of New Hampshire; 1927–1929	Succeeded by Charles W. Tobey
