= 1914 New Hampshire gubernatorial election =

- November 3, 1914
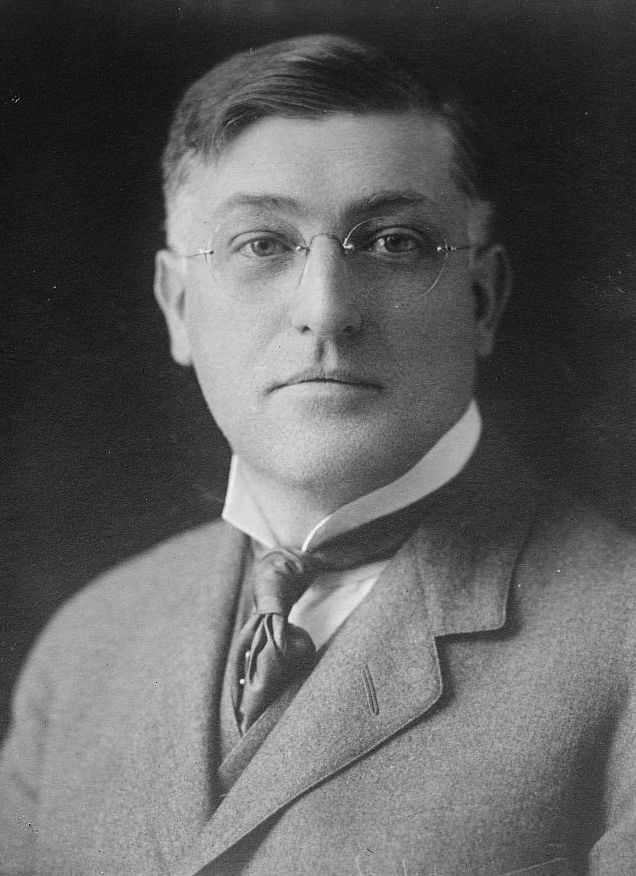

Nominee	Rolland H. Spaulding	Albert W. Noone
Party	Republican	Democratic
Popular vote	46,413	33,674
Percentage	55.18%	40.04%
- Spaulding: 40-50% 50–60% 60–70% 70–80% 80–90% >90% Noone: 40-50% 50–60% 60–70% 70–80% Tie: 50%
Governor before election
Samuel D. Felker
Democratic
Elected Governor
Rolland H. Spaulding
Republican

The 1914 New Hampshire gubernatorial election was held on November 3, 1914. Incumbent Democratic Governor Samuel D. Felker declined to seek re-election. Businessman Rolland H. Spaulding won the Republican primary and faced Executive Councilor Albert W. Noone, the Democratic nominee, in the general election. Spaulding defeated Noone in a landslide.

== Democratic primary ==
=== Candidates ===
- Albert W. Noone, Executive Councilor
- John C. Hutchins, State Senator

=== Results ===
Democratic primary results
Party	Candidate	Votes	%
Democratic	Albert W. Noone	5,356	50.01%
Democratic	John C. Hutchins	5,354	49.99%
Total votes		10,710	100.00%

== Republican primary ==
=== Candidates ===
- Rolland H. Spaulding, businessman
- Rosecrans W. Pillsbury, former publisher of the Manchester Daily Union

=== Results ===
Republican primary results
Party	Candidate	Votes	%
Republican	Rolland H. Spaulding	11,900	61.68%
Republican	Rosecrans W. Pillsbury	7,393	38.32%
Total votes		19,293	100.00%

== General election ==
=== Candidates ===
- Rolland H. Spaulding (Republican)
- Albert W. Noone (Democratic)
- Henry D. Allison (Progressive)
- John P. Burke (Socialist)

=== Results ===
1916 New Hampshire gubernatorial election
Party	Candidate	Votes	%	±%
Republican	Rolland H. Spaulding	46,413	55.18%	+16.15%
Democratic	Albert W. Noone	33,674	40.04%	−1.03%
Progressive	Henry D. Allison	2,572	3.06%	−14.23%
Socialist	John P. Burke	1,423	1.69%	−0.32%
Write-in		26	0.03%	—
Majority		12,739	15.15%	+13.11%
Total votes		84,108	100.00%	
Republican hold				
