= John Gilbert Winant =

American Republican politician and diplomat

John Winant OM
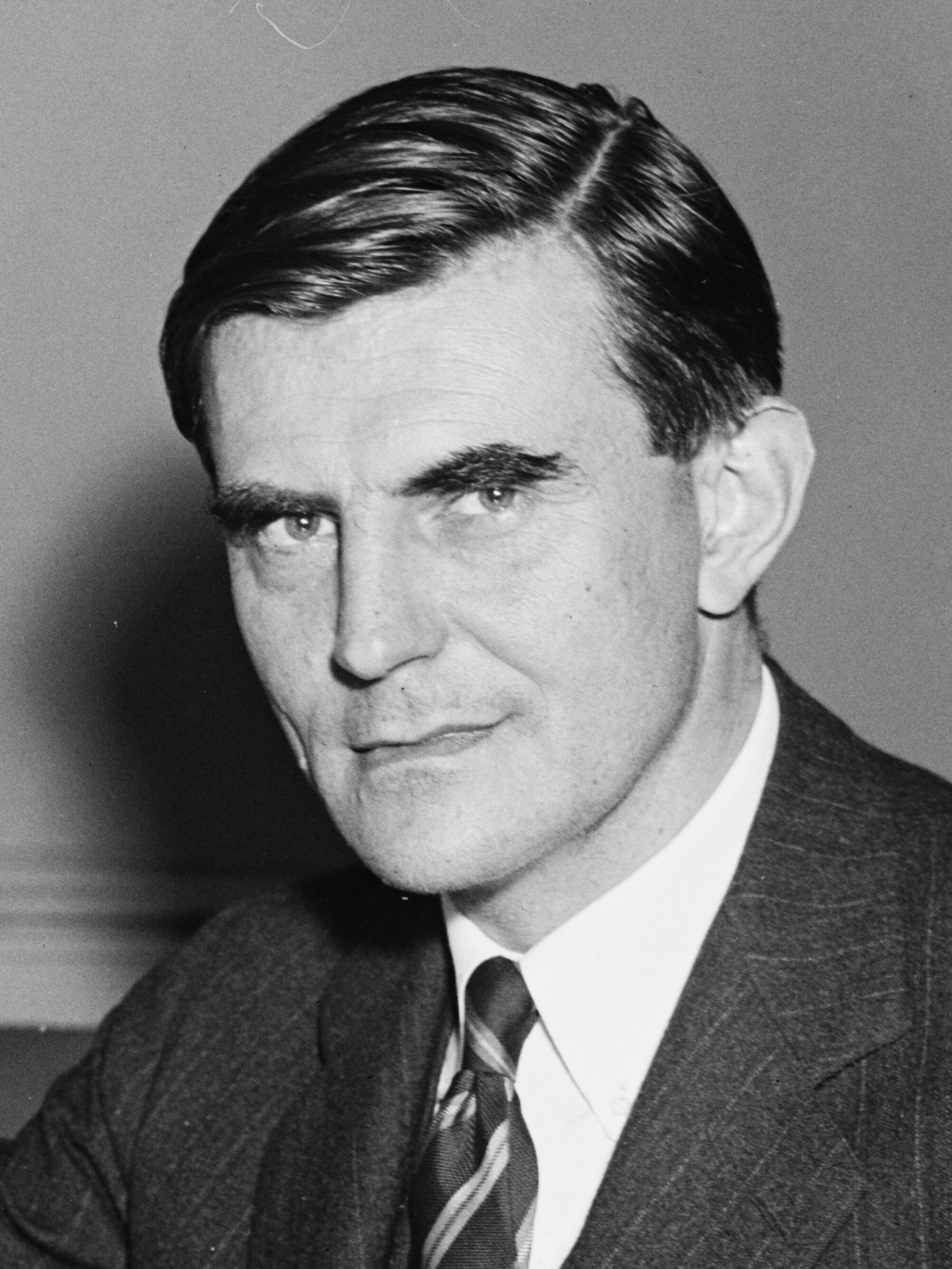
- Winant in 1935

45th United States Ambassador to the United Kingdom
- In office March 1, 1941 – April 10, 1946
- President: Franklin D. Roosevelt; Harry S. Truman
- Preceded by: Joseph P. Kennedy Sr.
- Succeeded by: Averell Harriman

Director-General of the International Labour Organization
- In office 1939–1941
- Preceded by: Harold Butler
- Succeeded by: Edward J. Phelan

Chair of the Social Security Board
- In office November 16, 1936 – February 19, 1937
- President: Franklin D. Roosevelt
- Preceded by: Arthur J. Altmeyer (acting)
- Succeeded by: Arthur J. Altmeyer
- In office August 23, 1935 – September 30, 1936
- President: Franklin D. Roosevelt
- Preceded by: Position established
- Succeeded by: Arthur J. Altmeyer (acting)

60th Governor of New Hampshire
- In office January 1, 1931 – January 3, 1935
- Preceded by: Charles W. Tobey
- Succeeded by: Styles Bridges
- In office January 1, 1925 – January 6, 1927
- Preceded by: Fred H. Brown
- Succeeded by: Huntley N. Spaulding

Personal details
- Born: February 23, 1889 New York City, New York, U.S.
- Died: November 3, 1947 (aged 58) Concord, New Hampshire, U.S.
- Party: Republican
- Spouse: Constance Rivington Russell (m. 1919)
- Children: 3
- Education: Princeton University (attended)

Military service
- Allegiance: United States
- Branch/service: United States Army
- Years of service: 1917–1919
- Rank: Captain
- Unit: United States Army Air Service
- Commands: 8th Aero Squadron
- Battles/wars: World War I; Western Front

John Gilbert Winant (February 23, 1889 – November 3, 1947) was an American diplomat and politician with the Republican party after a brief career as a teacher in Concord, New Hampshire. John Winant held positions in New Hampshire, national, and international politics. He was the 60th governor of New Hampshire from 1925 to 1927 and 1931 to 1935. Winant also served as U.S. Ambassador to the United Kingdom during most of World War II. Depressed by career disappointments, a failed marriage and heavy debt, he killed himself in 1947.

== Early life ==
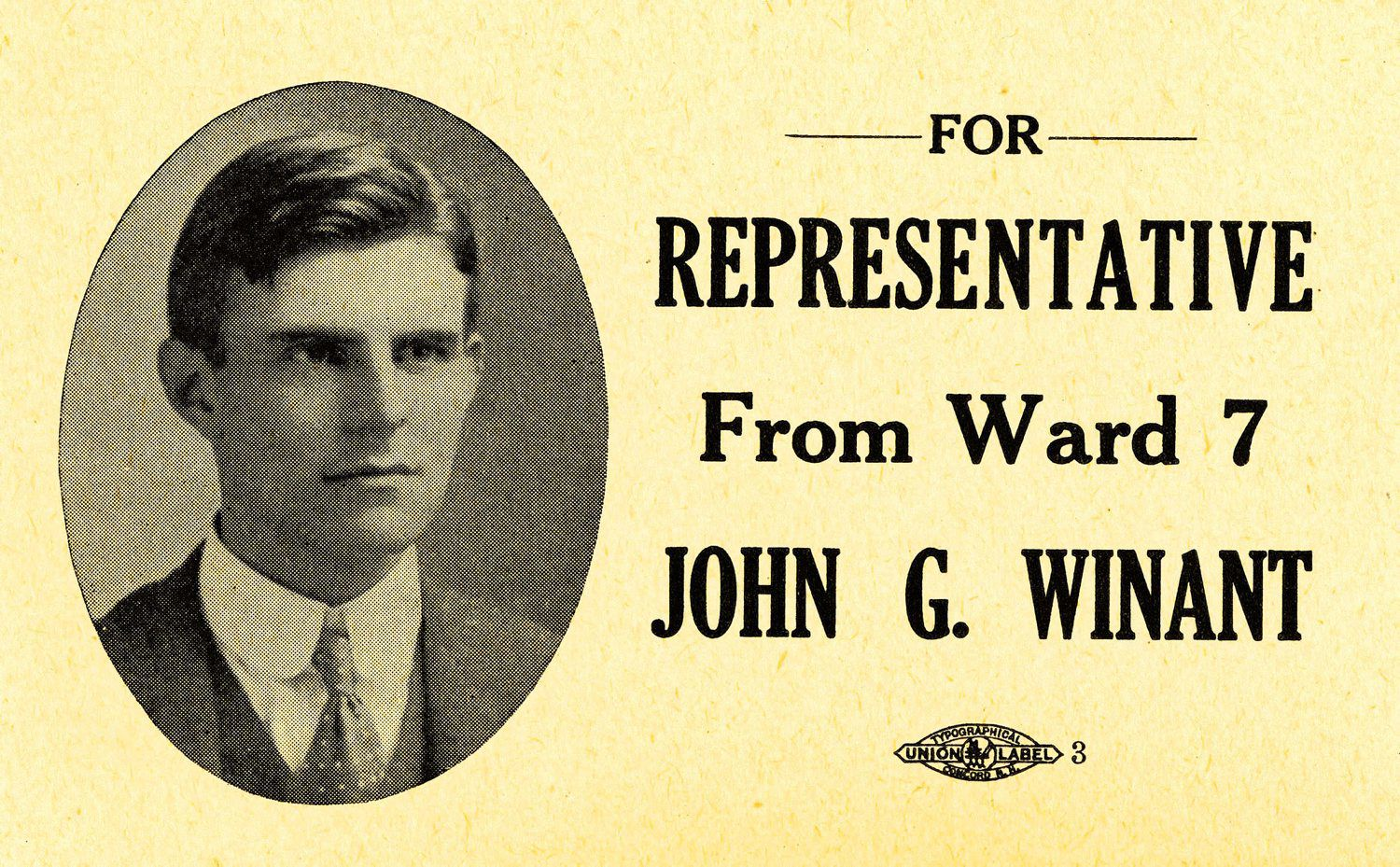
Campaign card, 1916

Winant was born on the East Side, New York City, the son of Frederick and Jeanette Winant. His father was a partner in a prosperous real estate company. Winant attended St. Paul's School in Concord and progressed to Princeton University, but he was a poor student and left without graduating. He was appointed an instructor in history at St. Paul's in 1913, remaining there until 1917. He was elected to the New Hampshire House of Representatives in 1916. In 1917, he joined the United States Army Air Service, trained as a pilot, and commanded the 8th Aero Squadron (Observation) in France, with the rank of captain.

== Public offices ==
Winant returned to his position at St. Paul's in 1919 after his military service, and was elected to the New Hampshire Senate in 1920. He lost money in oil stocks in 1929, which he had profited from through the 1920s.

=== Governor of New Hampshire ===
He twice served as Governor of New Hampshire: from 1925 to 1927, and from 1931 to 1935. He served his later term during the Great Depression and responded in several ways. He oversaw an emergency credit act which allowed the state to guarantee debts of municipalities so that local governments could continue. He pushed through a minimum wage act for women and children. During the Depression, Winant fought to keep improving the state's highways while reorganizing the state banking commission and pursuing more accurate accounting of state agencies' funds. Working closely with the federal government, Winant was the first governor whose state filled its enrollment quota in the Civilian Conservation Corps.

=== Social Security Board ===
Subsequently, President Franklin D. Roosevelt appointed Winant as first head of the Social Security Board in 1935, a position he held until 1937. At the time, it was rumored that Roosevelt appointed Winant to prevent him from running for President in 1936, but Winant never admitted to Presidential aspirations.

=== International Labour Organization ===
The next year, he was elected to head the International Labour Organization in Geneva, Switzerland, from January 1939. As Director-General, he was preceded by Harold Butler and succeeded by Edward J. Phelan.

=== Ambassador to the United Kingdom ===
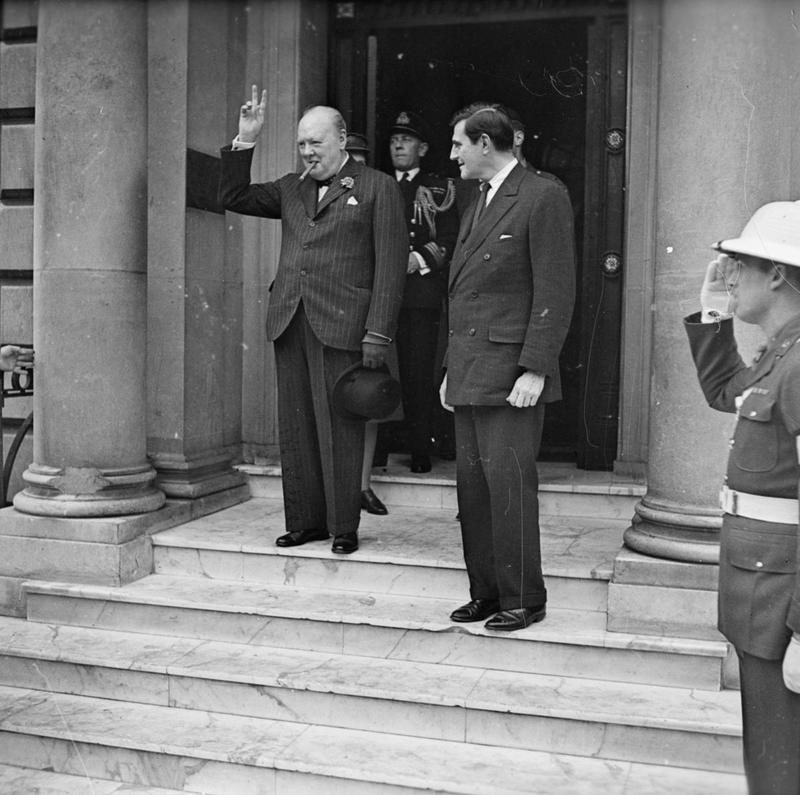
Winant with Winston Churchill during World War II

In 1941, Roosevelt appointed Winant ambassador to the Court of St. James's, and Winant remained in that post until he resigned in March 1946. Winant dramatically changed the U.S. stance towards Britain compared to his predecessor, Joseph P. Kennedy Sr. Upon landing at Bristol airport in March 1941, Winant announced "I'm very glad to be here. There is no place I'd rather be at this time than in England." The remark heartened a country that had come through the Battle of Britain and was in the midst of The Blitz, and it was featured dramatically on the front pages of most British newspapers the next day.

The new ambassador quickly developed close contacts with King George VI and Prime Minister Winston Churchill, even though the U.S. was only providing military aid and the Axis was not yet at war with the U.S. Winant had an affair with Churchill's second daughter Sarah Churchill during that time.

Winant was with Churchill when Churchill learned of the attack on Pearl Harbor.

=== Return to the US ===
President Harry S. Truman appointed Winant as the U.S. representative to UNESCO in 1946. But Winant soon retired to Concord shortly after to write his memoirs. However, he found himself unable to adjust to a quieter pace of life. "Everywhere Winant turned he saw the drama in which he had participated so significantly drawing to a close." Estranged from his socially ambitious wife and deeply in debt, he became profoundly depressed.

== Personal life ==
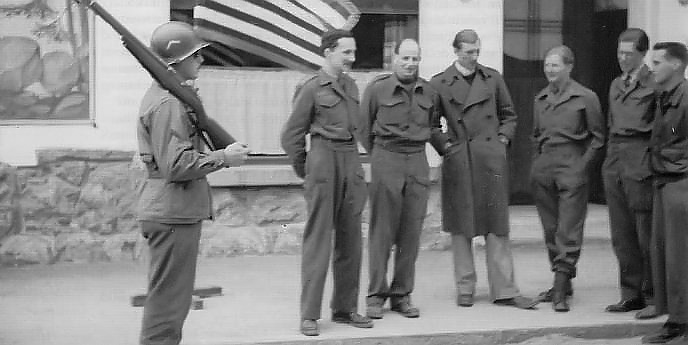
John Winant Jr. (far right) with other Prominente after their release.

Winant married Constance Rivington Russell (1899–1983) in 1919. They had a daughter, Constance Russell Winant (1921–1978), and two sons, John Gilbert Winant Jr. (1922–1993) and Rivington Russell Winant (1925–2011). The younger Constance married Carlos Valando, a Peruvian scientist, in 1941. John Winant Jr. served as a bomber pilot in World War II and was taken prisoner by the Germans. Sent to Colditz, he was removed in April 1945 as one of the Prominente to be used as a bargaining chip by Himmler and the SS as the end of the war approached; he was eventually released. Rivington Winant also served in World War II and later became treasurer at the United Nations.

Towards the end of Sarah Churchill's marriage to Vic Oliver, she began an affair with John Winant; it is believed the failure of the relationship contributed to the depression that led to Winant's suicide in 1947.

== Suicide ==
Winant shot himself in the head at his Concord home on November 3, 1947, the day his book Letter from Grosvenor Square was published. The book Citizens of London reports that after Roosevelt's death, with Winant distanced from his Republican Party base, "[h]e hoped that he was going to become secretary-general of the new UN... On top of that [disappointed hope], his affair with Sarah Churchill ended badly. 'He was an exhausted, sick man after the war'," author Olson continued in the interview on NPR.

Winston Churchill sent four dozen yellow roses to Winant's funeral, and the British king and queen sent their condolences by telegram.

Winant was buried at Blossom Hill Cemetery in Concord; his wish to be buried in St. Paul's School's consecrated cemetery was refused by the Episcopalian rector on the grounds that suicide was a sin. However, in the more secular culture of 1968, his casket was reinterred at St. Paul's. His epitaph was his 1946 quote:

Doing the day's work day by day, doing a little, adding a little, broadening our bases wanting not only for ourselves but for others also, a fairer chance for all people everywhere. Forever moving forward, always remembering that it is the things of the spirit that in the end prevail. That caring counts and that where there is no vision the people perish. That hope and faith count and that without charity, there can be nothing good. That having dared to live dangerously, and in believing in the inherent goodness of man, we can stride forward into the unknown with growing confidence.

== Honors ==
In 1947, Winant was only the second (and last) American citizen, after General Dwight Eisenhower, to be made an honorary member of the British Order of Merit. In 1943, he was awarded the Freedom of the City of Aberdeen.

== Legacy ==
In what amounted to a eulogy, The New York Times wrote of Winant two days after his death:

Here was a man who truly loved mankind and tried all his life to make the lot of his fellow-men better and happier... Governor Winant was a liberal Republican. When President Roosevelt summoned him to a larger field as head of the Social Security Board, his political opponents called him "a Republican New Dealer."

In 1948, the Winant Clayton Volunteers formed in honor of Winant and the Reverend Philip "Tubby" Clayton, organizer of the Toc H Christian charity in the First World War. Initially, American volunteers came to London to help British families rebuild churches and community centers damaged during World War II. In 1959 the exchange was reciprocated with Winant volunteers traveling from America to England while the Claytons go from England to work in the United States.

In 1982, The Carsey Institute at the University of New Hampshire established The John G. Winant Fellowship for students interested in working in non-profit or governmental organizations.

In 2009, Rivington Winant, with his wife Joan, donated 85 acres of land in Concord for the creation of Winant Park in honor of his late father and mother. The property sits on what was formerly the Winants' estate and offers the public biking, hiking and cross-country ski trails. Rivington Winant said his goal was to create "something that would be useful to the people of Concord, and something my father would like."

Two positions have been endowed in Winant's honor at the University of Oxford: the John G. Winant Lectureship in U.S. Foreign Policy and the John Gilbert Winant Visiting Professorship of American Government, which is held at Oxford's Rothermere American Institute.

On June 30, 2017, a statue of Winant was unveiled outside the New Hampshire State Library in Concord. The campaign to build the statue with private funds was led by Van McLeod, longtime Commissioner of New Hampshire's Department of Cultural Resources, and the former Speaker of the New Hampshire House, Steve Shurtleff.

== General bibliography ==
- Bellush, Bernard. He Walked Alone: A Biography of John Gilbert Winant. The Hague: Mouton, 1968.
- Winant, John Gilbert. A Letter from Grosvenor Square: An Account of a Stewardship. Hodder & Stoughton, 1947.

Party political offices
Preceded by Windsor Goodnow	Republican nominee for Governor of New Hampshire; 1924	Succeeded by Huntley N. Spaulding
Preceded by Charles W. Tobey	Republican nominee for Governor of New Hampshire; 1930, 1932	Succeeded by Styles Bridges
Political offices
Preceded by Fred H. Brown	Governor of New Hampshire; 1925–1927	Succeeded by Huntley N. Spaulding
Preceded by Charles W. Tobey	Governor of New Hampshire; 1931–1935	Succeeded by Styles Bridges
New office	Chair of the Social Security Board; 1935–1936	Succeeded by Arthur J. Altmeyer; Acting
Preceded by Arthur J. Altmeyer; Acting	Chair of the Social Security Board; 1936–1937	Succeeded by Arthur J. Altmeyer
Positions in intergovernmental organisations
Preceded by Harold Butler	Director-General of the International Labour Organization; 1939–1941	Succeeded by Edward J. Phelan
Diplomatic posts
Preceded by Joe Kennedy	United States Ambassador to the United Kingdom; 1941–1946	Succeeded by Averell Harriman
Non-profit organization positions
Preceded by Clarence A. Dykstra	President of the National Municipal League; 1940–1946	Succeeded by Charles Edison
