= Rolland H. Spaulding =

American politician (1873–1942)

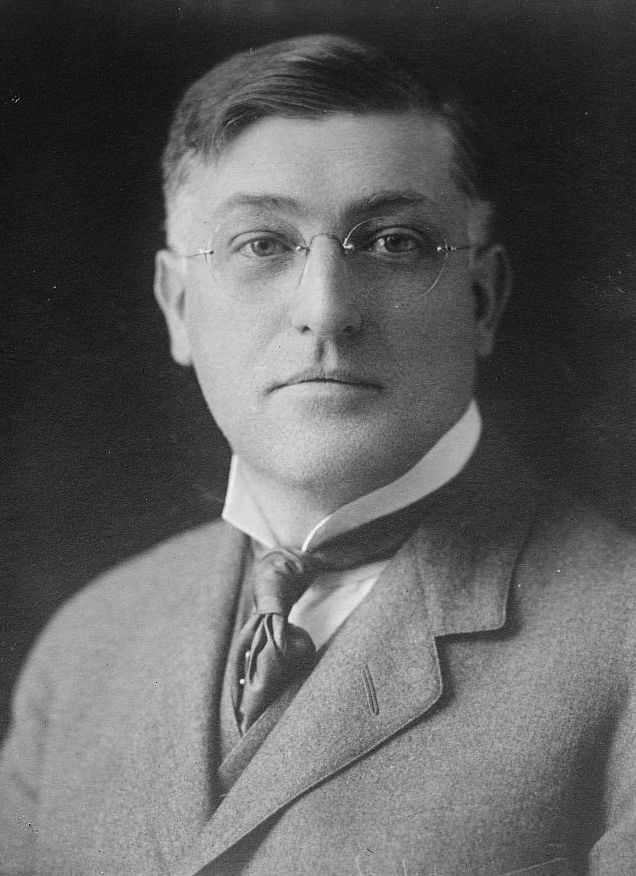
- Spaulding, c. 1910–1915

55th Governor of New Hampshire
- In office January 1, 1915 – January 2, 1917
- Preceded by: Samuel D. Felker
- Succeeded by: Henry W. Keyes

Personal details
- Born: March 15, 1873 Townsend, Massachusetts
- Died: March 14, 1942 (aged 68) Rochester, New Hampshire
- Party: Republican
- Spouse: Vera Going

Rolland Harty Spaulding (March 15, 1873 – March 14, 1942) was an American manufacturer and Republican politician. He was the 55th governor of New Hampshire from 1915 to 1917.

== Early life and education ==
Rolland Harty Spaulding was the third son of Jonas Spaulding and Emeline Cummings. He was born in 1873 in Townsend Harbor, Massachusetts, where his father and uncle had a fiberboard mill. His father founded a mill at Rochester, New Hampshire and moved his family there. The young Spaulding was educated at Phillips Academy, class of 1893.

== Career ==
With his two older brothers, Rolland Spaulding joined their father in the family business, renamed J. Spaulding and Sons, which ran mills to produce leatherboard (typically produced by pulping and compressing scrap leather and wood pulp). In addition to mills in Massachusetts and New Hampshire, that his father had founded, Rolland and his brothers Leon C. and Huntley N. Spaulding, built one in Tonawanda, New York, which became the largest.

Rolland Spaulding became a prominent businessman, working with his father and brothers in the family industry. Their family-owned company manufactured fiberboard, later adding a type of resin laminate named Spauldite® (to compete with Bakelite) and fiberglass tubing to their product lines.

Spaulding became active in Republican Party state politics. He was elected Governor in 1914, but declined to run for a second term. Spaulding sought the Republican nomination for the U.S. Senate in 1918, but narrowly lost the primary to his successor as Governor, Henry W. Keyes.

Like his brothers and sister Marion, Rolland became a philanthropist. He died the day before his 69th birthday, in Rochester, New Hampshire.

== Honors ==
- Spaulding Turnpike was named for Rolland and his brother Huntley N. Spaulding. It connects their hometown of Rochester to I-95.
- The Spaulding brothers are featured on New Hampshire historical marker no. 42

Party political offices
Preceded by Franklin Worcester	Republican nominee for Governor of New Hampshire; 1914	Succeeded by Henry W. Keyes
Political offices
Preceded by Samuel D. Felker	Governor of New Hampshire; 1915–1917	Succeeded by Henry W. Keyes
