= John H. Bartlett =

American politician (1869–1952)

John Henry Bartlett
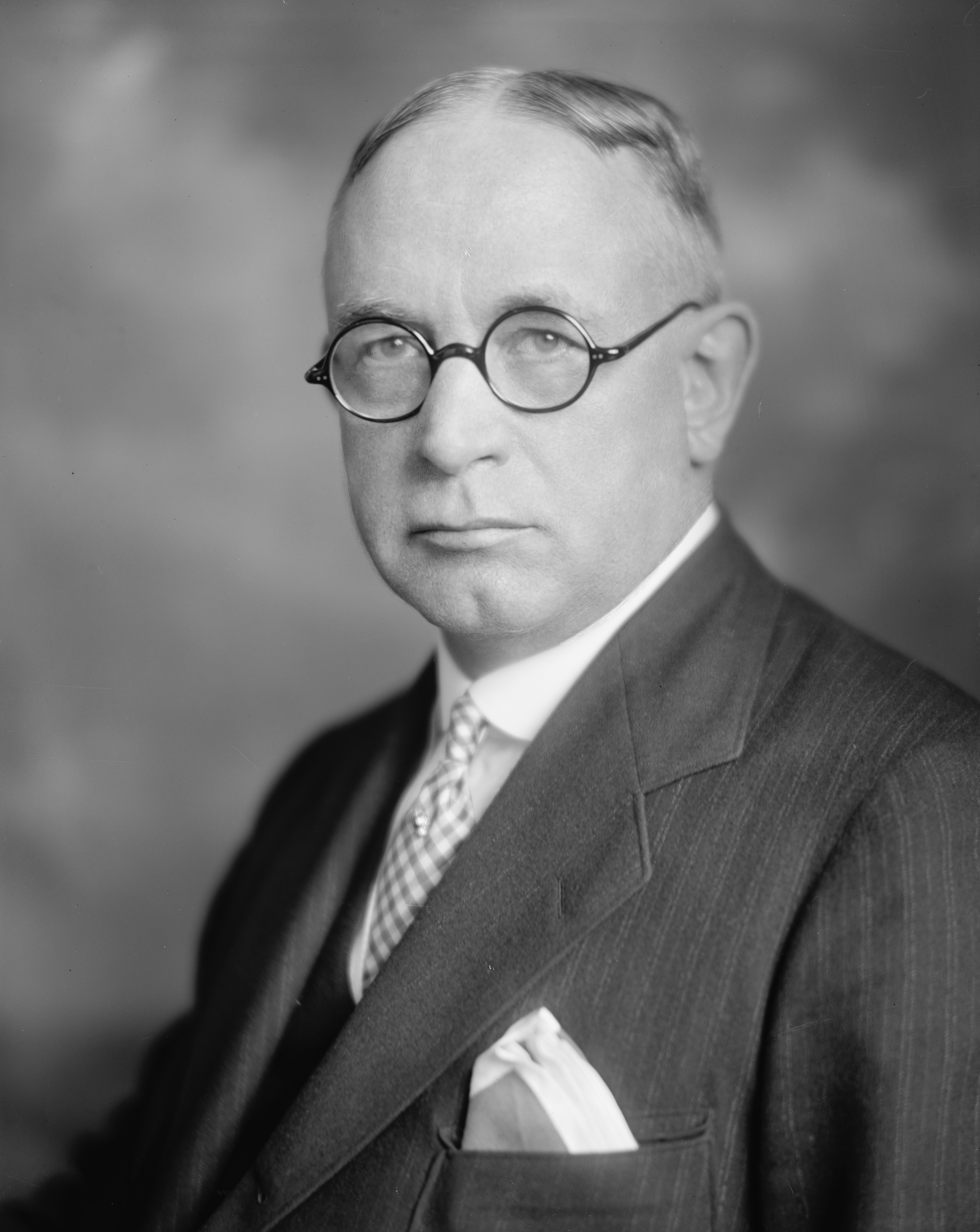
- Bartlett in 1905

57th Governor of New Hampshire
- In office January 6, 1919 – January 6, 1921
- Preceded by: Henry W. Keyes
- Succeeded by: Albert O. Brown

Personal details
- Born: March 15, 1869 Sunapee, New Hampshire, U.S.
- Died: March 19, 1952 (aged 83) Portsmouth, New Hampshire, U.S.
- Party: Republican until 1939 Democratic (1939–1952)
- Spouses: Agnes Page Bartlett (m. 1900; died 1944) Mildred C. Lawson (m. 1944)
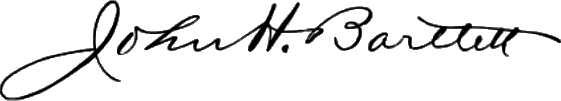
- Signature

John Henry Bartlett (March 15, 1869 – March 19, 1952) was a descendant of Josiah Bartlett, New Hampshire's first governor and a signatory of the United States Declaration of Independence. John H. Bartlett was an American teacher, high school principal, lawyer, author and Republican politician from Portsmouth, New Hampshire. He graduated from Dartmouth College in 1894 and served as the 57th governor of New Hampshire from 1919 to 1921.

Bartlett later served as president of the United States Civil Service Commission and was appointed as the first United States Assistant Postmaster General.

In 1929 he was appointed chairman of the United States section of the International Joint Commission for the United States and Canada, until his retirement in 1939.

== Education and personal life ==
John Henry Bartlett was born on March 15, 1869, in Sunapee, New Hampshire, as the second son and third child of John Z. and Sophronia (Sargent) Bartlett. Bartlett grew up in Sunapee and attended public school there through high school. Bartlett then attended Colby-Sawyer College in New London, New Hampshire, at the time called Colby Academy. From 1890 to 1894, Bartlett attended Dartmouth College. After graduation he became a teacher at the high school in Portsmouth, New Hampshire. Bartlett taught for four years, the last two years also serving as principal to the school.

Bartlett married Agnes Page, a daughter of Judge Calvin and Arabella J. (Moran) Page in June 1900. They had one son, Calvin Page Bartlett, born October 8, 1901. They stayed married until her death on April 25, 1944. Later that year, Bartlett remarried to Mildred C. Lawson.

Bartlett affiliated with the Unitarian Church and was a Knight Templar Mason of DeWitt Clinton Commandery of Portsmouth, New Hampshire, and a Knight of Pythias.

Throughout his life, he maintained an interest in education and his birthplace of Sunapee, New Hampshire. He was elected as a trustee of Colby-Sawyer College. In 1955, three years after his death, a yearly scholarship award was established for students from Sunapee called the Governor John H. Bartlett Fund. Bartlett also published several books on New England and political topics.

John Henry Bartlett died at the age of 83 on March 19, 1952, in Portsmouth, New Hampshire.

== Political career ==
While teaching in Portsmouth, New Hampshire, Bartlett studied law with Judge Calvin Page. He was admitted to the bar in 1898, becoming an associate of Judge Page. Bartlett's most successful and important case was William Turner vs. Cocheco Manufacturing Company, in which a state law was established to furnish adequate fire escapes.

Bartlett began to take an active part in political movements and allied with the Republican Party. He was elected postmaster of Portsmouth, New Hampshire on December 13, 1899, which he served until 1907. Bartlett left the position of postmaster to serve on former Governor John McLane's staff. As a member of McLane's staff, he was given the rank of colonel and became responsible for making preparations for the Russo-Japanese War peace conference that led to the signing of the Treaty of Portsmouth officially ending that war.

Former Governor Robert P. Bass appointed Bartlett as the representative of the state of New Hampshire at the sixth annual meeting of the American Academy of Political and Social Science, which was held at Philadelphia in March, 1912.

In 1916, Bartlett presided over the Republican State Convention. He served in the New Hampshire state House of Representatives before being elected governor in 1918. Declining to run for a second term, Bartlett served as president of the United States Civil Service Commission and was then appointed as the first United States Assistant Postmaster General in 1922, sponsoring the first transcontinental air mail service.

In 1929, he was appointed chairman of the United States section of the International Joint Commission for the United States and Canada, until his retirement in 1939.

Bartlett's New Deal sympathies caused him to switch to the Democratic Party, and he ran unsuccessfully as a Democrat for the United States Congress.

Throughout Bartlett's political career and after retirement, he spoke at events throughout New England and at graduation ceremonies.

=== Governorship ===
John Henry Bartlett ran for governor of New Hampshire in 1918 against Nathaniel E. Martin of Concord, New Hampshire. Bartlett won the election by over 6,000 votes and entered office on January 6, 1919, and served as the 65th Governor of New Hampshire until January 6, 1921.

During Bartlett's term, the state adopted an executive budget system and the state's employee liability law was revised. New Hampshire cities also secured the rights to acquire and operate interurban street railways.

Bartlett signed the purple lilac into law as the state flower of New Hampshire on March 28, 1919.

== Published works ==
=== Books ===
- Dartmouth Athletics: A Complete History of All Kinds of Sports at the College. 1893
- In Memoriam: Warren Gamaliel Harding 1923
- Spice for Speeches 1926
- Folks is Folks 1927
- The Legend of Ann Smith: A New England Story in Verse 1931
- The Bonus March and the New Deal 1937 OCLC 477820
- A Synoptic History of the Granite State 1939
- In Memoriam: Joseph Delmar Bartlett 1940
- The Story of Sunapee 1941
- Sketches From My Scrap Books and Diaries 1948

=== Addresses ===
- Message of His Excellency John H. Bartlett, Governor of New Hampshire, to the Two Branches of the Legislature January 2, 1919
- Address of John H. Bartlett: Before a Mass Meeting of the National Civil Service Reform League at Washington, D.C. April 27, 1922
- Each Political Party Will Be Judged by its Presidential Candidate April 14, 1928

Party political offices
Preceded by Henry W. Keyes	Republican nominee for Governor of New Hampshire; 1918	Succeeded by Albert O. Brown
Political offices
Preceded by Henry W. Keyes	Governor of New Hampshire; 1919–1921	Succeeded by Albert O. Brown
