= List of members of the Executive Council of New Hampshire =

This is a list of members of the Executive Council of New Hampshire. At present, this list is only complete from 1901 onward; people who served prior to 1901 may still be missing.

== A ==
- Joseph J. Acorace, 1969–71
- Albert Annett, 1909–11
- Arthur T. Appleton, 1939–41

== B ==
- Daniel W. Badger, 1913–15
- Walter Barefoote, 1683–85
- George W. Barnes, 1921–23
- Jesse M. Barton, 1925–27
- Cyprien J. Belanger, 1929–31
- Loring B. Bodwell, 1901–03
- C. Edward Bourassa, 1949–53
- Henry W. Boutwell, 1909–11
- John P. Bowler, 1963–65
- Charles H. Brackett, 1933–35
- Roger E. Brassard, 1957–63
- John F. Bridges, 1973–75
- Frank P. Brown, 1907–09
- John H. Brown, 1918–21
- Ora A. Brown, 1927–29
- Raymond S. Burton, 1977–79, 1981–2013

== C ==
- William P. Cahill, 1985–87
- Charles E. Carroll, 1933–35
- Edward H. Carroll, 1917–18
- Solon A. Carter, 1915–17
- John B. Cavanaugh, 1915–17
- Richard Chamberlain, 1683–86
- Robert N. Chamberlain, 1901–03
- Romeo J. Champagne, 1953–57
- John P.H. Chandler, Jr., 1953–59
- Guy E. Chesley, 1927–29
- Job Clement, 1680–1683
- Stephen W. Clow, 1919–21
- Thomas Colantuono, 1999–2001
- Oscar P. Cole, 1923–25
- Alfred A. Collins, 1903–05
- Thomas J. Conway, 1923–25
- Burt R. Cooper, 1935–37
- Michael J. Cryans, 2019–21
- Edward H. Cullen, 1967–69
- Lynn Cutler, 1935–37
- John Cutt, 1680–81, original member

== D ==
- Charles M. Dale, 1937–39
- Samuel Dalton, 1680–81
- Thomas Daniel, 1680–83
- Louis D'Allesandro, 1975–81
- William S. Davis, 1931–33
- Harold K. Davison, 1939–41
- Dudley W. Dudley, 1977–85
- Charles T. Durell, 1955–57

== E ==
- John A. Edgerly, 1925–27
- Royal H. Edgerly, 1967–69
- Robert Elliot, 1683
- Thomas Entwistle, 1911–13

== F ==
- Harold G. Fairbanks, 1941–45
- James C. Farmer, 1935–37
- Philip H. Faulkner, 1923–25
- James G. Fellows, 1909–11
- Franklin Flanders, 1947–49
- Howard R. Flanders, 1951–55
- Fred H. Fletcher, 1955–59, 1963–65, 1967–69
- Charles M. Floyd, 1905–07
- William H.C. Follansby, 1907–09
- Alonzo M. Foss, 1909–11
- Stephen A. Frost, 1923–25
- Nathaniel Fryer, 1683–1684

== G ==
- Ted Gatsas, 2019–present
- Louis Georgopoulos, 1981–87
- Frank L. Gerrish, 1927–29
- John M. Gile, 1911–13
- John Gilman, 1680–83, original member
- Lewis G. Gilman, 1913–15
- Paul J. Gingras, 1947–49
- Windsor H. Goodnow, 1919–21
- Herbert I. Goss, 1918–19
- Miles W. Gray, 1917–18
- Henry Francis Green 1899–1901
- Charles H. Greenleaf, 1905–07
- Benjamin F. Greer, 1911–13
- Judd Gregg, 1979–81
- Ruth L. Griffin, 1987–2007

== H ==
- Fred W. Hall, Jr., 1963–65
- John A. Hammond, 1925–27
- Bob Hayes, 1993–95
- James H. Hayes, 1959–77
- Philip C. Heald, 1943–45
- Oren V. Henderson, 1939–41
- Charles H. Hersey, 1901–03
- Lyle E. Hersom, 1971–77
- Karen Liot Hill, 2025–present
- John Hinckes, 1683
- Albert Hislop, 1921–23
- Paul W. Hobbs, 1947–49
- Beverly Hollingworth, 2007–2011
- Harry L. Holmes, 1929–31
- Harry D. Hopkins, 1929–31
- Joseph Woodbury Howard, 1905–07
- Charles B. Hoyt, 1931–33
- Albert H. Hunt, 1927–29
- Frank Huntress, 1915–17
- Christopher Hussey, 1680–82, original member

== J ==
- Andrew Jarvis, 1961–63
- Stephen S. Jewett, 1907–09

== K ==
- Frank E. Kaley, 1903–05
- Thomas H. Keenan, 1959–61
- A. Crosby Kennett, 1903–05
- Joseph Kenney, 2014–19; 2021–present
- George H. Keough, 1953–55

== L ==
- Edward G. Leach, 1905–07
- William H. Leith, 1929–31
- Thomas J. Leonard, 1935–37, 1945–47
- Harry T. Lord, 1911–13
- Samuel A. Lovejoy, 1925–27
- Alvin A. Lucier, 1937–39
- C. Wesley Lyons, 1953–55

== M ==
- James C. MacLeod, 1933–35, 1945–47
- Robert L. Mallat, Jr., 1965–67
- Albert R. Martineau, 1943–45
- Richard Martyn, 1680–83, original member
- Robert Tufton Mason, 1681–86
- Donald G. Matson, 1947–49
- Paul M. Mayette, 1979–81
- George W. McGregor, 1913–15
- William B. McInnis, 1931–33
- Malcolm McLane, 1977–83
- Harry Merrill, 1929–31
- Lyford A. Merrow, 1909–11
- Parker M. Merrow, 1955–57
- Charles M. Mills, 1949–51
- William A. Molloy, 1941–43
- Carl E. Morin, 1947–49
- Arthur E. Morneau, 1925–27
- Arthur P. Morrill, 1923–25
- Francis P. Murphy, 1933–35
- Thomas A. Murray, 1937–43

== N ==
- Albert W. Noone, 1913–15
- James A. Normand, 1997–99
- George T. Noyes, 1951–53
- Anthony Nutter, 1681–82

== O ==
- Daniel A. O'Brien, 1959–61

== P ==
- Chris Pappas, 2013–2019
- Jared Perkins, 1846–1848
- John W. Perkins, 1943–1945
- Debora Pignatelli, 2005–2011, 2013–2015, 2019–2021
- Peter R. Poirier, 1945–1947
- James J. Powers, 1931–1933
- Albert J. Precourt, 1927–1929
- Russell Prescott, 2017–2021

== Q ==
- Austin F. Quinney, 1965–67

== R ==
- Edward Randolph, 1683
- Seth M. Richards, 1903–05
- Earl A. Rinker III, 1987–97
- Fred S. Roberts, 1921–23
- George D. Roberts, 1941–43
- Philip A. Robertson, 1961–63, 1967–69
- George Hamilton Rolfe, 1937–41
- Alphonse Roy, 1933–37

== S ==
- George L. Sadler, 1921–23
- Daniel St. Hilaire, 2011–13
- Ansel N. Sanborn, 1941–43
- William H. Sawyer, 1913–15
- John Scammon, 1915–17
- James Frank Seavey, 1903–05
- John Shea, 2007–2011
- Emile Simard, 1963–67
- Scott C.W. Simpson, 1943–45
- Harry P. Smart, 1949–51
- J. Guy Smart, 1949–51
- Stephen W. Smith, 1969–71
- Peter Spaulding, 1995–2007
- Charles F. Stafford, 1949–53
- Elias Stileman, 1680–83
- Bernard A. Streeter, Jr., 1969–79, 1981–2001
- Joshua Studley, 1945–47
- William A. Styles, 1965–67
- Christopher Sununu, 2011–2017
- William D. Swart, 1917–19
- Janet L. Stevens, 2021-

== T ==
- James B. Tennant, 1901–03
- Renfrew A. Thomson, 1951–53, 1957–59
- Fred S. Towle, 1905–07
- George E. Trudel, 1921–23
- Edmund E. Truesdell, 1901–03
- George H. Turner, 1911–13

== U ==
- James Duncan Upham, 1907–09

== V ==
- Colin Van Ostern, 2013–17
- Charles W. Varney, 1917–19
- William Vaughan, 1680–84, original member
- Moise Verrette, 1917–19
- Herbert B. Viall, 1907–09
- Andru Volinsky, 2017–21

== W ==
- Fred T. Wadleigh, 1931–33
- Robert Wadleigh, 1684–1686
- Richard Waldron, 1680–83, 89, original member
- Richard Waldron Jr., 1681–82
- James B. Wallace, 1915–17
- John S. Walsh, 1971–73
- Harold Weeks, 1959–63
- John G. Welpley, 1919–21
- Robert E. Whalen, 1969–75
- David K. Wheeler, 2001–05, 2011–13, 2015–19, 2021–present
- Virgil D. White, 1937–39
- Arthur G. Whittemore, 1919–21
- Charles H. Whittier, 1957–59
- Raymond Wieczorek, 2002–13
- George Albert Wooster, 1945–47

== Y ==
- Leon G. Yeaton, 1975–77
