= Chris Christie 2016 presidential campaign =

Chris Christie for President, Inc.
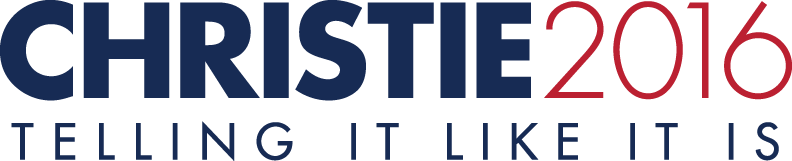
- Campaign: 2016 Republican Party presidential primaries
- Candidate: Chris Christie; Governor of New Jersey (2010–2018)
- Affiliation: Republican Party
- Status: Announced: June 30, 2015; Suspended: February 10, 2016
- Headquarters: P.O. Box 225; Colonia, New Jersey
- Receipts: US$7,159,328 (2015-12-31)
- Slogan: Telling it like it is

Website
- www.chrischristie.com

The 2016 presidential campaign of Chris Christie, the 55th Governor of New Jersey, began on June 30, 2015, at an event in his hometown of Livingston, New Jersey. Following a poor showing in the New Hampshire primary, the campaign was suspended on February 10, 2016. He endorsed Donald Trump on February 26, 2016.

== Background ==
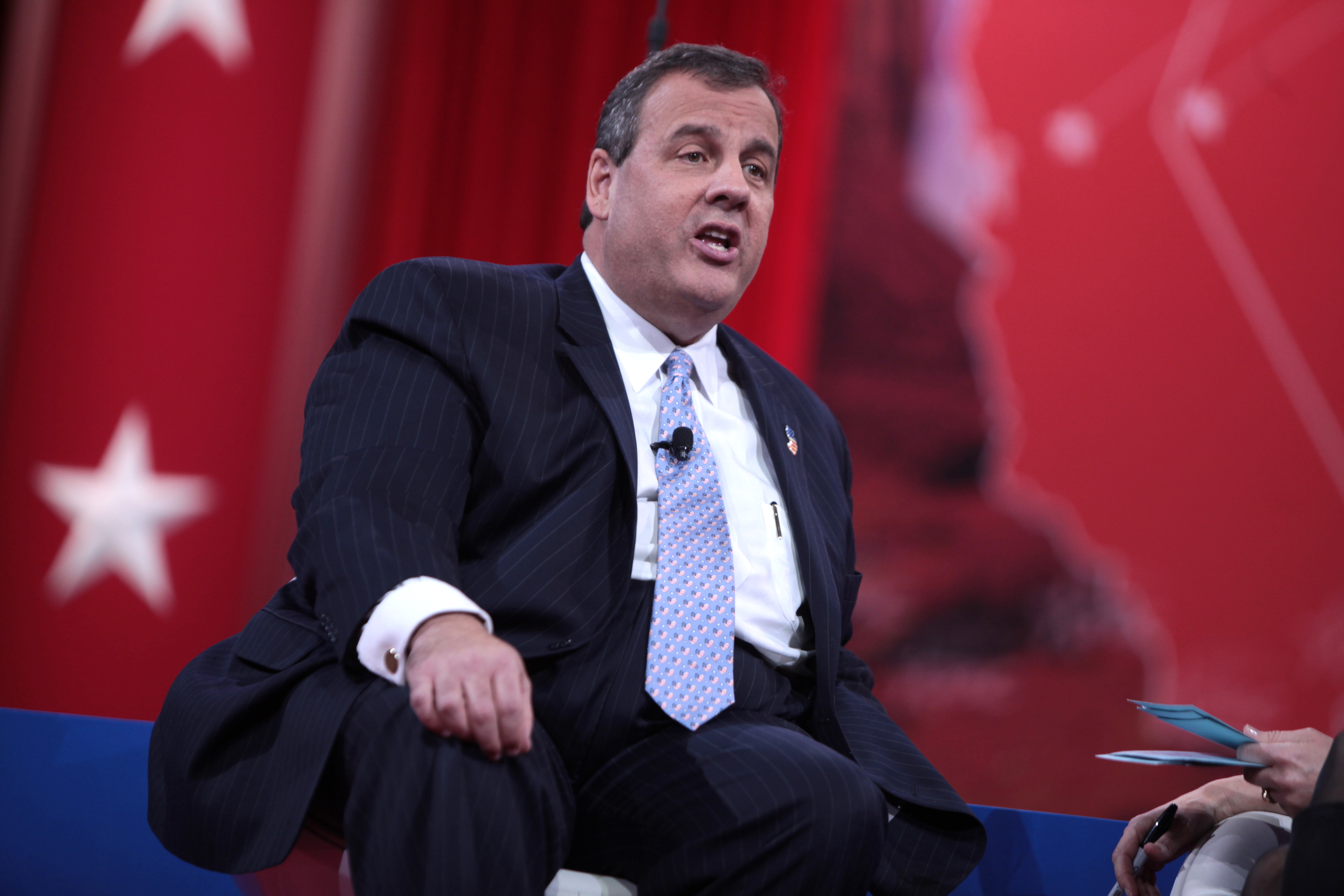
Chris Christie speaking at the Conservative Political Action Conference

Some political commentators viewed Christie as a leading contender for the Republican presidential nomination in 2016. According to polls conducted after the George Washington Bridge lane closure scandal, which began in September 2013, Christie sustained a substantial erosion in his political standing and his 2016 presidential campaign prospects, and polls showed him behind Hillary Clinton in general election polling.

In an interview on Fox News on March 31, 2014, Christie stated that he was still in "decision-making process" regarding a possible run in 2016, and forwarded the names of Jeb Bush, Scott Walker, and Paul Ryan as his top three GOP candidate choices.

=== 2012 presidential election ===
Christie contemplated running for president in the 2012 election, but ultimately declined to do so. He was vetted, but not chosen, by Mitt Romney as a potential vice-presidential candidate. The Romney campaign was reported to have asked him to resign his governorship if he became the vice-presidential nominee because "pay-to-play" laws restrict campaign contributions from financial corporation executives to governors running for federal office when the companies do business with the governor's state. A memo from the campaign attributed Romney's decision not to choose Christie as his running mate in part to unanswered questions during the vetting process regarding a defamation lawsuit following Christie's initial campaign for Morris County Freeholder, a Securities and Exchange Commission investigation of Christie's brother, as well as his weight. Christie gave the keynote address at the 2012 Republican National Convention.

=== Republican Governors Association ===
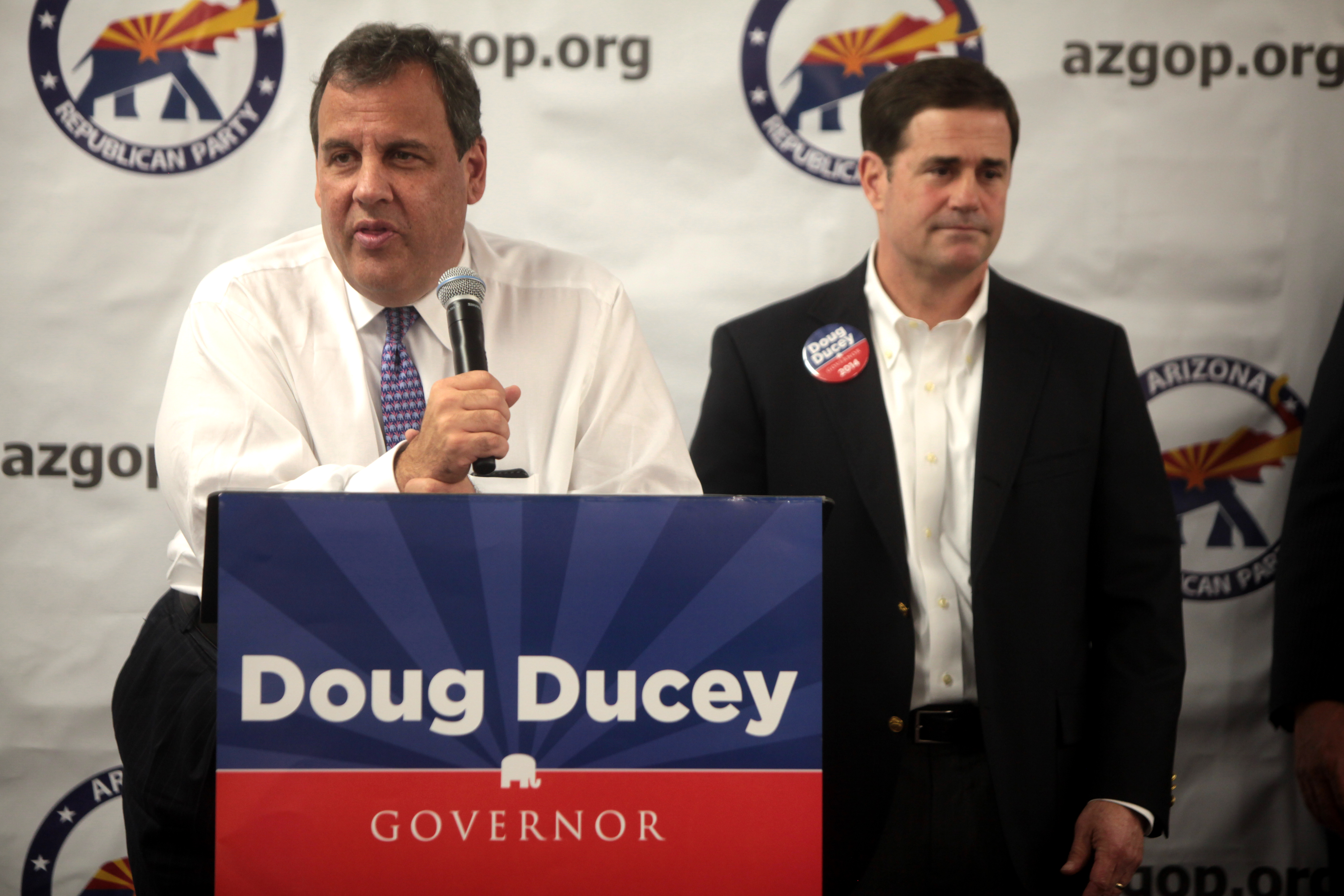
Governor Chris Christie campaigning with Gubernatorial candidate Doug Ducey in Arizona

On November 21, 2013, Christie was elected Chairman of the Republican Governors Association. Christie campaigned extensively on behalf of Republican governors who were running for reelection, and for Republican gubernatorial candidates seeking to defend open seats or flip Democratic-held ones. The association raised $117 million during his chairmanship. The largest donors were Koch industries and David H. Koch, which together gave $3.5 million, and Sheldon Adelson, who donated $3.5 million. Christie's tenure as chairman was seen as successful, as Republicans held all of their 22 seats aside from Alaska and Pennsylvania, while picking up governorships in Arkansas, Illinois, Maryland and Massachusetts that had been previously held by Democrats.

=== Political action committees ===
The political action committee Leadership Matters was launched January 25, 2015, in order to raise funds and set the groundwork for what Time magazine called "a likely 2016 presidential campaign". The America Leads super PAC, headed by Phil Cox, was registered with the Federal Election Commission on February 23, 2015. As of mid-July the latter had raised $11 million. As of December 2016 the organisation was still in operation. As of April 2017, the campaign still had outstanding debts.

=== Campaign launch ===
Christie formally launched his 2016 presidential campaign on June 30, 2015, at his high school in Livingston, New Jersey. He had already launched his campaign website on June 27. At the announcement he stated that both political parties had "failed our country", and called for more compromise in politics. "I am now ready to fight for the people", Christie said in his announcement speech. "I am proud to announce my candidacy for the Republican nomination for the presidency of the United States of America."

Christie began his campaign with a stop in Maine where he met with Maine Governor Paul LePage, who was the first sitting Republican governor to offer an endorsement for any of the party's 2016 presidential candidates. Calling LePage's endorsement an honor, Christie said, "To receive an endorsement from someone who knows what it's like to run a blue state, who knows what it's like to make tough decisions, who knows what it's like to engage in hand-to-hand combat to try to get things done for the people who elect you – to get an endorsement from Paul LePage today is an incredible honor."

Greg Brown, chairman and chief executive officer of Motorola Solutions, chair of the Federal Reserve Bank of Chicago, chair of the Rutgers board, and executive committee member of the Business Roundtable, was a member of the campaign's finance committee.

== New Jersey ==
=== State Police security detail ===
Christie has said that his campaign will not reimburse the state for the tax-payer funded New Jersey State Police security detail which travels with him on campaign trips.

Between 2010 and 2014, the state police billed the state $1 million. There have also been more than $800,000 in credit-card expenses related to political and private trips made by the governor, which the administration has refused to make public. Costs to taxpayers for the first quarter of 2015 were $185,000.

"We're going to continue to conduct this in the same way I've always conducted it", Christie said. New Jerseyeans are overwhelmingly opposed to paying for the Executive Protection Unit for Christie's campaign.

Christie regularly makes use of the state police helicopter for official and unofficial business, for which his campaign partially reimburses the state.

The New Jersey Senate was considering a bill which would require reimbursement of "expenses incurred for travel, food, lodging, security, or any other purposes not directly related to the Governor's regular and official duties as Governor" when traveling out of state to engage in political activities. Christie and his campaign are being sued by three advocacy organisations (New Jersey Citizen Action, New Jersey Families Alliance and BlueWaveNJ) as well as several New Jersey residents who cite his absenteeism from the governorship and misuse of funds.

After withdrawing from the race, Christie continued to travel to campaign for Trump. In the first quarter of 2016 travel costs for the security detail were $170,000, a considerable drop.

=== Absence from state ===
Christie was absent from New Jersey 261 days in 2015. Christie was highly criticized for first not planning to return to New Jersey and then staying only briefly for the January 2016 United States blizzard. When asked why he was campaigning in New Hampshire when parts of the Jersey Shore were flooded in sea water Christie said: "What do you want me to do, go down there with a mop?" Records show 190 full days and 71 partial days in 2015 cost NJ taxpayers about $614,000. The final quarter of 2015, when Christie spent 32 days out of state campaigning for the presidency, cost $193,890. The bills totaled cost $492,420 in 2014, $220,355 in 2013; $248,277 in 2012; $129,842 in 2011 and $64,975 in 2010, which did not include the cost of overtime for the State Police troopers in EPU, which according to state regulations is confidential. A lawsuit which claimed that Christie "inappropriately forced New Jersey taxpayers to cover the cost of the governor's security and other key expenses while pursuing the presidency" was dismissed.

=== Approval ratings ===
In December 2015/January 2016 Christie's approval ratings in New Jersey dropped to their lowest ever during his tenure to 31%.

== Debates ==
Polling had created uncertainty about Christie qualifying for participation in the jointly sponsored Fox News-Facebook Republican Party presidential debate, the first of the election cycle, on August 6, 2015, which allows for the 10 highest-polling politicians to participate. Christie claimed he would qualify. The methodology used for inclusion is not known. Christie placed ninth in the polls, qualifying for a place.

Christie's average standing in polls conducted after the debate raised questions as to whether he would be permitted to participate in the main stage CNN primetime debate in September. Christie ranked 10th in qualifying polls.

Christie did not have the necessary 2.5% standing to participate in the November main stage event, but with 1% qualified for the earlier undercard debate event.

A rapid improvement his poll numbers however saw him being propelled back to the main stage for the debate on December 15. Christie made debatable claims in the January 14, 2016, debate.

In the February 6, 2016, GOP debate, Christie attacked Marco Rubio, who was polling in third place nationally, criticizing him for repeating his "25 second speech" and not getting to the issues at hand on the campaign trail. His attacks, combined with a verbal gaffe by Rubio, were seen as a devastating blow to his campaign and contributed to his fifth-place finish in New Hampshire. Christie placed sixth.

== Iowa and New Hampshire ==
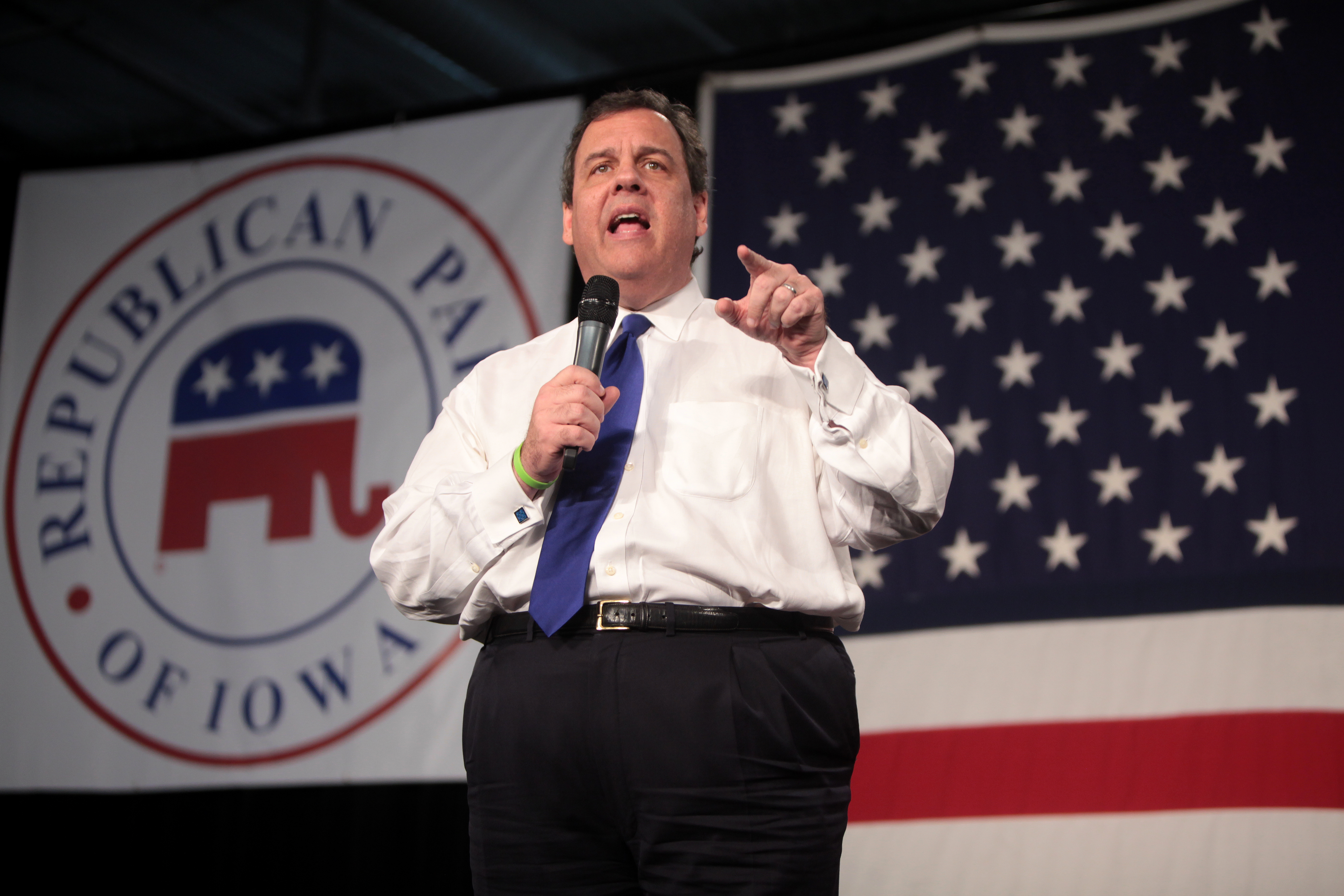
Christie speaking at an event hosted by the Iowa Republican Party in October 2015

He spent considerable time in Iowa in 2014 laying groundwork. He had little expectation to win. He placed 10th in a field of 12 candidates with 1.8% of the ballots cast. Having claimed he would be "number one" of the state governors running, he came in 4th.

Christie focused much of his campaign's effort in winning the New Hampshire Republican primary, for which a former Governor's Office staff member and political operative began working in winter 2014.

On January 4, 2016, at his campaign headquarters in New Hampshire Christie said "I'm going to be up here until Wednesday night. We'll take a short break, go back home, deliver the State of the State address the week after next in New Jersey, and then come back out on the road again".

Christie campaigned extensively using a town meeting format, but in polls before the primary he slipped and fell behind. He spent 70 days in the state.

In the New Hampshire debate he attacked candidate Marco Rubio. He placed sixth in a field of nine in the New Hampshire primary on February 9.

Christie got 57,637 votes or 0.18% during the whole 2016 Republican Party presidential primaries.

== Trump endorsement ==
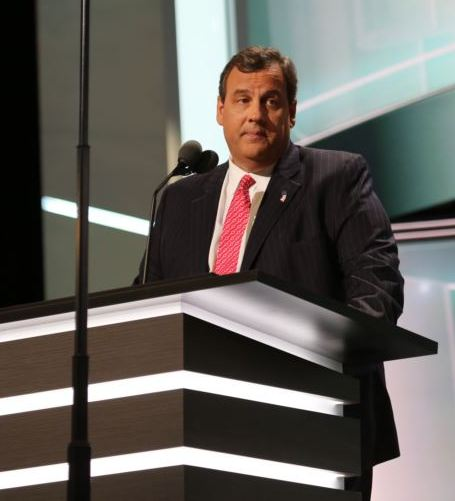
Christie campaigning for Trump and the 2016 Republican National Convention

Christie endorsed Donald Trump on February 26, 2016 and began campaigning for him.

Following the announcement, the publisher of the New Hampshire Union Leader, which had endorsed Christie, said that Christie had committed to him that he would never endorse Trump. A few days later the paper ran an editorial which stated that it had been wrong to endorse Christie. Hewlett-Packard chief executive Meg Whitman, a major contributor who served in the role of National Finance Co-chair for Christie's ill-fated campaign, called the endorsement "an astonishing display of political opportunism". The New York Times called the new relationship with Trump "a bully bromance".

Of the endorsement, Governor of Ohio John Kasich, the only governor left in the Republican presidential nominee field, said he was "a little bit surprised" and "it happens". Governor of South Carolina Nikki Haley said "Chris is a dear friend but none of us understands why he did this." Former GOP Governor of New Jersey Christine Todd Whitman said the endorsement would make her consider voting for Hillary Clinton. Governor of Massachusetts Charlie Baker, who had endorsed Christie, said he was surprised and "I don't believe that his endorsement of Donald Trump says much of anything of why I chose to endorse him."

On March 2, 2016, six New Jersey–based Gannett Company-owned newspaper called for Christie's resignation. The papers Asbury Park Press, Courier-News (Bridgewater), The Courier-Post (Cherry Hill), Home News Tribune (East Brunswick), Daily Record (Morristown), The Daily Journal, (Vineland) in a joint editorial said: "We're fed up with his long neglect of the state to pursue his own selfish agenda. We're disgusted with his endorsement of Donald Trump after he spent months on the campaign trail trashing him, calling him unqualified by temperament and experience to be president", the editorial read. "And we're fed up with his continuing travel out of state on New Jersey's dime, stumping for Trump, after finally abandoning his own presidential campaign." On March 3, 2016, the New Jersey Advance Media-owned The Star-Ledger called for Christie's resignation.

New Jersey GOP lawmakers Jennifer Beck (R-Monmouth), Amy Handlin (R-Monmouth), Jack Ciattarelli (R-Somerset) said that Christie could not continue to serve as governor if Christie went on the campaign trail for Trump.

Following the announcement Christie was severely mocked and ridiculed on social media.

== Positions ==
=== Immigration ===
In December 2013, Christie signed legislation allowing unauthorized immigrants who attend high school for at least three years in New Jersey and graduate to be eligible for the resident rates at state college and universities and community colleges.

=== Abortion ===
Early in his political career, Christie stated in an interview that "I would call myself … a kind of a non-thinking pro-choice person, kind of the default position". In 2009, Christie identified himself as anti-abortion, but stated that he would not use the governor's office to "force that down people's throats", while still expressing support for banning "partial-birth abortion", parental notification, and a 24-hour waiting period. He does support legal access to abortion in cases of rape, incest, or if the woman's life is in danger.

In 2014, campaigning in Alabama for incumbent governor Robert Bentley, Christie stated that he was the first "pro-life governor" elected in New Jersey since Roe v. Wade in 1973. He also stated that he had vetoed funding for Planned Parenthood five times as governor. In March 2015, Christie joined other potential 2016 Republican presidential candidates in endorsing a ban on abortions after 20 weeks of pregnancy.

=== LGBT rights ===
As governor, Christie opposed same-sex marriage but voiced support for New Jersey's civil union law, which extended to gay couples the same legal benefits of marriage with regards to state law. Christie indicated in 2009 that he would veto any bill legalizing same-sex marriage in the state, saying, "I also believe marriage should be exclusively between one man and one woman.... If a bill legalizing same sex marriage came to my desk as Governor, I would veto it." On February 17, 2012, Christie vetoed a bill that would have legalized same-sex marriage in New Jersey. The bill passed by wide but not veto-proof margins in both houses of the legislature. Christie instead proposed that the issue be presented to the voters in a statewide ballot referendum.

The issue was rendered moot shortly thereafter by a state court decision, in which the judge stated New Jersey was "... violating the mandate of Lewis and the New Jersey Constitution's equal protection guarantee". The Christie administration responded by asking the state Supreme Court to grant a stay of the decision pending appeal, which was denied on October 18, 2013, in a 7–0 decision of the court which stated that it could "find no public interest in depriving a group of New Jersey residents of their constitutional right to equal protection while the appeals process unfolds". Three days later Christie withdrew the state's appeal.

Christie believes that homosexuality is innate, having said, "If someone is born that way, it's very difficult to say then that that's a sin." On August 19, 2013, Christie signed a bill outlawing gay conversion therapy for children, making New Jersey the second state to institute such a law. The law was challenged in the courts, with Christie, in his official capacity as governor, named an appellee. In September 2014, a panel of the 3rd U.S. Circuit Court of Appeals upheld the law, saying it did not violate free speech or religious rights.

=== Social Security and Medicare ===
In a speech at the New Hampshire Institute of Politics on April 14, 2015, Christie proposed significant reforms to federal benefit programs. The proposals included reductions of Social Security benefits for high-income seniors, an expansion of means testing for Medicare recipients, and an increase in the eligibility age for Social Security and Medicare. Christie indicated that his proposals would not affect existing retirees or those close to retirement. Christie proposed comprehensive federal entitlement reforms, stating: "In the short term, it is growing the deficit and slowly but surely taking over all of government. In the long term, it will steal our children's future and bankrupt our nation." Christie's proposals would add means testing for Social Security benefits starting with those who make more than $80,000 per year in non-Social Security income and phasing out Social Security benefits entirely for those with more than $200,000 in other income annually. Similarly, Christie's proposals would increase the sliding scale of means testing for Medicare such that seniors with $85,000 in annual income would pay 40% of premium costs and those with more than $196,000 in annual income would pay 90% of premium costs. He also proposed raising the retirement age for Social Security benefits by two months each year starting in 2022, until the retirement age reaches 69. He would likewise raise the age for early retirement from 62 to 64. In addition, he proposed raising the eligibility age for Medicare by one month each year so that seniors would be eligible for benefits at 67 years of age in 2040 and 69 years of age in 2064. Christie also stated: "Here's what you'll learn about me. I have been talking about the growth of entitlements as a big problem, at both the state and federal levels, for a number of years. Not because it is politically popular, but because it is true."

=== Supreme Court justices ===
In 2009, Christie said of Sonia Sotomayor: "I support her appointment to the Supreme Court and urge the Senate to keep politics out of the process and confirm her nomination. Qualified appointees should be confirmed and deserve bi-partisan support. Chief Justice Roberts and Justice Alito deserved that support based on their work as Circuit Court Judges. So does Judge Sotomayor. As a result, I support her confirmation. This is a historic moment and her inspiring success story should not only make the Latino community proud, but all Americans."

In response to the 2015 Supreme Court rulings regarding the Affordable Health Care Act (King v. Burwell) and same-sex marriage in the United States (Obergefell v. Hodges), Christie said that the outcomes would have been different if the court had more Christie type judges on the bench. Christie also said "If you want to know the kind of justices to the Supreme Court that a President Christie would pick, you need to look at one seat on the Supreme Court, and that's the seat of judge Sam Alito."

=== Prison reform ===
Christie supported changes in the criminal justice system which address disparities in sentencing, particularly for non-violent and drug-related crimes. He acknowledges racial disparities in sentencing.

=== Israel–Palestine ===
In March 2014, Christie gave a foreign policy speech to the Republican Jewish Coalition also attended by other Republican presidential hopefuls. In it, Christie said that everyone he met in Israel during his visit, wanted America to be an "unblinking, unwavering unquestioning friend" but worried that this was no longer true. He said that he is in the business to win elections and not just arguments, saying "If we want to just have arguments and stand for nothing, we could just form a university." Christie said he was overwhelmed by displays of religious tolerance during his recent trip to Jerusalem and used the term "occupied territories" in reference to lands in dispute. Christie later apologized for the remark, which is rejected by some conservative Zionists and other supporters of Israel who see it as validating Palestinian views.

=== Planned Parenthood ===
As governor, In 2010 Christie vetoed $7.5 million in funding for family planning clinics, including Planned Parenthood, saying the money was duplicative and unaffordable. He vetoed the funding four more times in following years. Christie had repeatedly stated the decision was financial and not one based on his beliefs. In February 2015 he stated. "I'm pro-life, I ran as a pro-life candidate in 2009 unapologetically, spoke at the pro-life rally on the steps of the Statehouse -- the first governor to ever speak at a pro-life rally on the steps of the Statehouse -- and vetoed Planned Parenthood funding five times out of the New Jersey budget."

"I support Planned Parenthood privately with my personal contribution and that should be the goal of any such agency, to find private donations", Christie was quoted saying in The Star-Ledger on September 30, 1994. In 2016, Christie said: "Well I never donated to Planned Parenthood…", Christie claims he was misquoted.

=== NSA domestic surveillance and national security ===
Christie supported the collection of metadata of phone calls of American citizens and denizens by the National Security Agency. Christie had cited his tenure as federal prosecutor to gain credibility with fighting terrorism. as a centerpiece of his campaign for the Republican presidential nomination. "We prosecuted two of the biggest terrorism cases in the world and stopped Fort Dix from being attacked by six American radicalized Muslims from a mosque in New Jersey because we worked with the Muslim American community to get intelligence and we used the Patriot Act to get other intelligence to make sure we did those cases", Christie said. Those cases on his watch and his claims are a source of continuing controversy. with regard to the use of undercover sting operations and informants. National security experts say that other than in two cases, the U.S. Attorney's office in New Jersey under Christie had no apparent role in any high-level international terror investigation while he headed the office, stating, "When it comes to terrorism prosecutions, of the 320 total convictions since 9/11. Christie has prosecuted only a couple, and both were FBI informant cases—not international terrorist plots, or even the most serious cases we have see."

=== Firearms ===
In June 2015, Christie said; "I know there's a lot of perception about my view on gun rights because I'm from New Jersey and because the laws are the way they are, but these laws were being made long before I was governor and no new ones have been made since I've been governor. During his term as governor Christie has vetoed some proposed legislation, re-written others, and signed on bills regulating firearms. Christie was not invited to attend the NRA convention in April 2016. Christie has defined his changing positions on gun control as "evolving". The New York Times has called it pandering. On January 16, 2016, Christie said:

I don't support background checks for every gun sale.

=== Fiscal policy ===
As governor of New Jersey, Christie had received grades of B in 2012 and B in 2014 from the Cato Institute, a libertarian think tank, in their biennial Fiscal Policy Report Card on America's Governors.

=== Syrian refugees ===
On November 16, Christie was interviewed by conservative radio host Hugh Hewitt and stated that his state would not take in Syrian refugees, including orphaned toddlers. In October 2014, Christie said "I've said before that if there comes a time when the U.S. needs to take some refugees that we should.". In January 2016, he said, "I said right from the beginning we should take no Syrian Refugees of any kind."

== Endorsements ==
Chris Christie endorsements

U.S. governors (current and former)

- Donald DiFrancesco, New Jersey (acting governor: 2001–2002)
- Larry Hogan, Maryland
- Paul LePage, Maine
- Charlie Baker, Massachusetts

U.S. senators (former)

- David Karnes, Nebraska (former)
- Jeffrey Chiesa, New Jersey (former)

U.S. representatives (current and former)

- Susan Brooks, representative from Indiana
- Bill Zeliff, former representative from New Hampshire
- Jeb Bradley, former representative from New Hampshire
- Mike Ferguson, former representative from New Jersey
- Rodney Frelinghuysen, representative from New Jersey
- Pat Meehan, representative from Pennsylvania
- Leonard Lance, representative from New Jersey
- Frank LoBiondo, representative from New Jersey
- Tom MacArthur, representative from New Jersey
- Jon Runyan, former representative from New Jersey; also former NFL offensive tackle

U.S. ambassadors (current and former)

- Thomas C. Foley, to Ireland (2006–2009)
- John Langeloth Loeb Jr., to Denmark (1981–1983), also UN delegate in 1984

Republican National Committee members (current and former)

- Wayne MacDonald, chair of NH GOP (former)
- Sam Raia, chair of NJ GOP (2011+)
- Jay Webber, chair of NJ GOP (2009–2011), also elected to New Jersey General Assembly

Statewide officials

- Karyn Polito, lieutenant governor of Massachusetts
- Kim Guadagno, lieutenant governor of New Jersey
- Drew Wrigley, lieutenant governor of North Dakota
- J. B. Van Hollen, former Wisconsin attorney general

State legislators

- Georgia state representative: Matt Hatchett (majority caucus chairman)
- Eight Iowa state representatives: Kraig Paulsen (speaker), Norlin Mommsen, Jim Van Fossen (former), Chip Baltimore, Gary Carlson, Dave Deyoe, Jake Highfill, Bill Schickel (former)
- Two Iowa state senators: Jim Kersten (former), Stewart Iverson (former Senate majority leader)
- Pennsylvania state senator: Joseph B. Scarnati, (president pro tempore)
- Five New Hampshire state senators: Robert Letourneau (former), Jerry Little, Peter Bragdon (former Senate President), Patricia Krueger (former), Nancy Stiles
- Thirty-three New Hampshire state representatives: David Danielson, Susan Emerson, Bill Ohm, Don LeBrun, Jack Balcom, Betsy McKinney, Jim Devine, Richard Brothers (former), Karen Hutchinson (former), Dennis Reed (former), Robert Scott (former), Paul Simard (former), Elaine Swinford (former), Steve Schmidt, Russell Dumais, Herb Richardson, John Cebrowski (former), Ken Hawkins (former), Jim Grenier, Kelleigh Murphy, Dennis Fields, John Mullen Jr., Donna Sytek (former speaker), Bob Fesh, John Potucek, Joe Krasucki (former), Tony Maiola (former), Dick Hinch (majority leader), Sherman Packard (speaker pro tempore), D.J. Bettencourt (former House majority leader), Frank Byron, David Hess, Shawn Jasper (speaker)
- Fifteen New Jersey state senators: Dawn Marie Addiego, Diane Allen (also former Philadelphia news anchor), Richard Bagger (former, also former chief of staff to Christie, and senior VP of Celgene), Kip Bateman, Jennifer Beck, Anthony Bucco, Gerald Cardinale, Christopher J. Connors, James W. Holzapfel, Thomas Kean Jr. (minority leader, also ran for U.S. Senate in 2006) Steve Oroho, Kevin J. O'Toole, Joseph Pennacchio, Robert Singer, Sam Thompson (also GOP chair of Middlesex County)
- Twenty-seven New Jersey state representatives: Mary Pat Angelini, Robert Auth, Jon Bramnick (minority leader), Christopher J. Brown, Tony Bucco, Caroline Casagrande, Jack Ciattarelli, Robert D. Clifton, Ronald S. Dancer, BettyLou DeCroce, John DiMaio, Sam Fiocchi, DiAnne Gove, Sean T. Kean, Gregory P. McGuckin, Alison Littell McHose, Nancy Munoz, Declan O'Scanlon, Erik Peterson, Dave Rible, Maria Rodriguez-Gregg, Scott Rumana, Brian E. Rumpf, David C. Russo, Donna Simon, Parker Space, David W. Wolfe

Businesspeople

- August Busch III, former chairman of Anheuser-Busch
- Steven A. Cohen, founder of Point72 Asset Management
- Kenneth Langone, co-founder of The Home Depot
- Linda McMahon, former CEO of World Wrestling Entertainment
- David J. Pecker, CEO of American Media
- Finn Wentworth, owner and founding partner of Normandy Real Estate Partners and former co-owner of the New York Yankees and the New Jersey Nets
- Meg Whitman, CEO of Hewlett Packard, former CEO of eBay, and 2010 Republican candidate for governor of California
- Walt Havenstein, former CEO of BAE Systems, and 2014 Republican candidate for governor of New Hampshire
- New Jersey: Robert J. Hugin (CEO of Celgene)

Newspapers

- Boston Herald
- New Hampshire Union Leader rescinded March 1, 2016

Celebrities, commentators, and activists

- New Jersey: Bob Yudin (Bergen County GOP chair)

Organizations: New Jersey GOP

== See also ==
- Governorship of Chris Christie
- Chris Christie: The Inside Story of His Rise to Power
- American Governor: Chris Christie's Bridge to Redemption
- Michael DuHaime
