= Don LeBrun =

American politician (1935–2025)

Member of the New Hampshire House of Representatives from the Hillsborough 26th district
- In office December 2010 – December 2012 Serving with Kevin J. Brown, Joseph F. Krasucki, Bill Ohm, Barry Palmer, Michael Reed, David S. Robbins, Peter Silva, James Summers, Randall Whitehead

Member of the New Hampshire House of Representatives from the Hillsborough 32nd district
- In office December 2012 – December 2018 Serving with David Murotake (2012–2018), John Kelley (2012–2014), Barry Palmer (2014–2016), Steve Negron (2016–2018)

Personal details
- Born: October 26, 1935 Dundalk, Maryland, U.S.
- Died: January 30, 2025 (aged 89) Nashua, New Hampshire, U.S.
- Party: Republican
- Spouse: Marcia Kostoulakos
- Education: Essex Community College (attended)

Donald L. LeBrun (October 26, 1935 – January 30, 2025) was an American politician from the state of New Hampshire. He served as a Republican member of the New Hampshire House of Representatives from 2010 to 2018.

== Life and career ==
LeBrun was born on October 26, 1935, in Dundalk, Maryland. He was raised in the Baltimore area and attended Essex Community College. He relocated to Nashua, New Hampshire, in 2000, after meeting his wife, Marcia Kostoulakos. He served as an alderman for Nashua's ward 5.

In 2010, LeBrun won a write-in bid to be one of ten Republican candidates for the Hillsborough 26th district of the New Hampshire House of Representatives. He went on to win the general election, representing Nashua wards 5, 8, and 9. In 2012, redistricting allocated Nashua's 5th ward to its own district, the Hillsborough 32nd. He won re-election there in 2012, 2014, and 2016, retiring in 2018. In 2012, he sponsored legislation that would have required EBT cardholders to have photo identification, stating that he would like food stamp recipients to undergo random drug testing. The following year, he unsuccessfully sponsored legislation that would revived straight-ticket voting, and successfully sponsored legislation that mandated background checks for summer camp employees. In 2016, he proposed legislation that would have required reporters to wear nametags while covering the state legislature, a move opposed by the state press association. That year, LeBrun endorsed Chris Christie's presidential campaign, and begrudgingly backed Donald Trump's bid, calling his behavior "immature" and "very juvenile."

He died at the age of 89 on January 30, 2025, in Nashua.

== Electoral history ==
=== 2010 ===
==== Primary election ====
New Hampshire House of Representatives, Hillsborough 26th District, 2010 primary election * denotes incumbent Source:
Party	Candidate	Votes	%
Republican	Peter Silva *	1,368	12.9
Republican	Barry Palmer	1,207	11.4
Republican	Bill Ohm	1,192	11.3
Republican	Kevin J. Brown	1,191	11.3
Republican	Randall Whitehead	1,189	11.2
Republican	David S. Robbins	1,100	10.4
Republican	Michael Reed	1,079	10.2
Republican	Joseph F. Krasucki	1,077	10.2
Republican	James Summers	1,067	10.1
Republican	Donald L. LeBrun (write-in)	81	0.8
Republican	Conard (write-in)	25	0.2
Total votes		10,576	100

==== General election ====
New Hampshire House of Representatives, Hillsborough 26th District, 2010 general election * denotes incumbent Source:
Party	Candidate	Votes	%
Republican	Peter Silva *	4,554	6.5
Republican	Kevin J. Brown	4,238	6.0
Republican	Bill Ohm	4,152	5.9
Republican	Randall Whitehead	4,010	5.7
Republican	Barry Palmer	3,977	5.6
Republican	Donald L. LeBrun	3,920	5.6
Republican	David S. Robbins	3,758	5.3
Republican	Michael Reed	3,749	5.3
Republican	James Summers	3,637	5.2
Republican	Joseph F. Krasucki	3,601	5.1
Democratic	Angeline Kopka *	3,531	5.0
Democratic	Brian Poznanski *	3,384	4.8
Democratic	Michael O'Brien *	3,266	4.6
Democratic	John Kelley *	3,193	4.5
Democratic	Carolyn M. Lisle *	2,968	4.2
Democratic	Tom Finnerty	2,943	4.2
Democratic	Arthur Douzanis	2,936	4.2
Democratic	Roland H. Laplante	2,911	4.1
Democratic	Linda C. Harriott-Gathright	2,868	4.1
Democratic	Richard Thompson	2,696	3.8
Write-in		110	0.2
Total votes		70,402	100

=== 2012 ===
==== Primary election ====
New Hampshire House of Representatives, Hillsborough 32nd District, 2012 primary election * denotes incumbent Source:
Party	Candidate	Votes	%
Republican	David Murotake	433	31.9
Republican	Donald L. LeBrun *	391	28.8
Republican	James Summers *	192	14.1
Republican	Barry Palmer *	184	13.5
Republican	Anthony G. DuBois	157	11.6
Write-in		2	0.1
Total votes		1,359	100

==== General election ====
New Hampshire House of Representatives, Hillsborough 32nd District, 2012 general election * denotes incumbent Source:
Party	Candidate	Votes	%
Republican	David Murotake	2,332	17.8
Republican	Donald L. LeBrun *	2,301	17.6
Democratic	John Kelley	2,300	17.5
Democratic	Michael Pedersen	2,226	17.0
Democratic	Rita Gail MacAuslan	2,094	16.0
Republican	James Summers *	1,853	14.1
Total votes		13,106	100

=== 2014 ===
==== Primary election ====
New Hampshire House of Representatives, Hillsborough 32nd District, 2014 primary election * denotes incumbent Source:
Party	Candidate	Votes	%
Republican	Donald L. LeBrun *	547	32.9
Republican	David Murotake *	520	31.3
Republican	Barry Palmer	323	19.4
Republican	James Summers	263	15.8
Republican	Michael Pedersen	1	0.1
Write-in		7	0.4
Total votes		1,661	100

==== General election ====
New Hampshire House of Representatives, Hillsborough 32nd District, 2014 general election * denotes incumbent Source:
Party	Candidate	Votes	%
Republican	David Murotake *	1,933	19.7
Republican	Donald L. LeBrun *	1,900	19.4
Republican	Barry Palmer	1,652	16.9
Democratic	Michael Pedersen	1,533	15.6
Democratic	Raymond P. Labrecque	1,473	15.0
Democratic	Rita Gail MacAuslan	1,298	13.2
Write-in		14	0.1
Total votes		9,803	100

=== 2016 ===
==== Primary election ====
New Hampshire House of Representatives, Hillsborough 32nd District, 2016 primary election * denotes incumbent Source:
Party	Candidate	Votes	%
Republican	Donald L. LeBrun *	466	34.6
Republican	David Murotake *	462	34.3
Republican	Steve Negron	409	30.4
Republican	Raymond P. Labrecque	1	0.1
Write-in		7	0.5
Total votes		1,345	100

==== General election ====
New Hampshire House of Representatives, Hillsborough 32nd District, 2016 general election * denotes incumbent Source:
Party	Candidate	Votes	%
Republican	Donald L. LeBrun *	2,462	18.0
Republican	David Murotake *	2,360	17.2
Republican	Steve Negron	2,346	17.1
Democratic	John Kelley	2,312	16.9
Democratic	Raymond P. Labrecque	2,286	16.7
Democratic	Marcus Hermansen	1,928	14.1
Write-in		9	0.1
Total votes		13,703	100
