= John Mullen =

John Mullen may refer to:

- John Mullen (catcher) (1856–1909), baseball player
- John Mullen (baseball executive) (1924–1991), baseball executive
- John Mullen (Australian executive) (born 1955), Australian corporate executive
- John J. Mullen (American football), American football coach
- John J. Mullen (mayor) (1876–1952), American politician
- John Joseph Mullen (1829–1897), member of the Queensland Legislative Council
- John Kernan Mullen (1847–1929), Irish-American businessman, philanthropist
- John A. Mullen (?–1929), American judge
- John Mullen (politician), American politician

== See also ==
- Jack Mullens (1896–1978), Australian politician
- John McMullen (disambiguation)
