= David Murotake =

American politician

Member of the New Hampshire House of Representatives from the 32nd Hillsborough district
- In office December 5, 2012 – December 5, 2018 Serving with Don LeBrun (2012–2018), John Kelley (2012–2014), Barry Palmer (2014–2016), Steve Negron (2016–2018)
- Preceded by: Constituency established
- Succeeded by: Dan Toomey; Allison Nutting-Wong; Michael Pedersen

Personal details
- Party: Republican

David Murotake is an American politician. He served as a Republican member for the Hillsborough 32nd district of the New Hampshire House of Representatives. He was first elected in 2012. He did not run for reelection in 2018.
