= James Summers =

James Summers may refer to:

- James Summers (educator) (1828–1891), British scholar of English literature, hired by the Japanese government to establish an English language curriculum
- James Woolley Summers (1849–1913), British politician
- James C. Summers (1838–1927), United States Army soldier and Medal of Honor recipient
- James Summers (American politician), member of the New Hampshire House of Representatives

== See also ==
- James Forrester (politician) (James Summers Forrester, 1937–2011), member of the North Carolina General Assembly
