= Steve Negron =

American politician

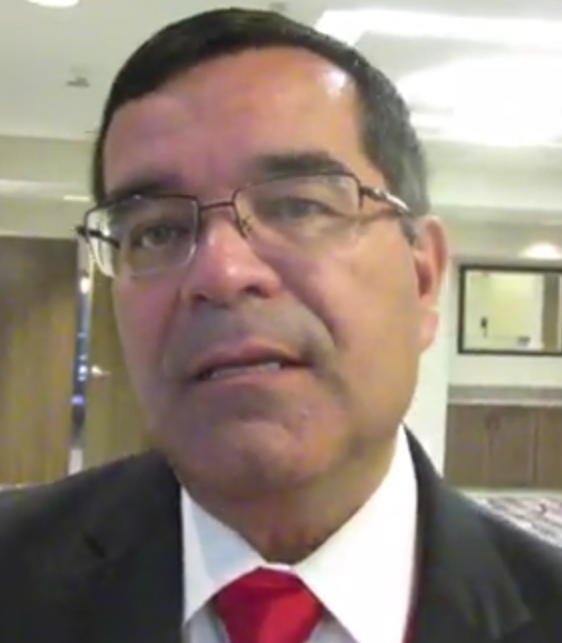

Member of the New Hampshire House of Representatives from the Hillsborough 32nd district
- In office December 7, 2016 – December 7, 2018 Serving with Don LeBrun, David Murotake
- Preceded by: Barry Palmer
- Succeeded by: Michael Pedersen

Personal details
- Party: Republican
- Spouse: Terry Negron
- Education: Texas Christian University (BS); Western New England University (MBA)
- Website: Campaign website

Military service
- Allegiance: United States
- Branch/service: United States Air Force
- Years of service: 1983–1998
- Rank: Major

Steve Negron is an American politician from Nashua, New Hampshire who served in the New Hampshire House of Representatives. He was the Republican nominee for the United States Congress in New Hampshire's 2nd congressional district in 2018 and 2020, losing both times to Democratic incumbent Annie Kuster.

== Early life ==
Negron received his bachelor's degree in criminal justice from Texas Christian University in 1983. Later, he received his Masters in Business Administration from Western New England College.

Negron served in the United States Air Force for fifteen years, joining shortly after college and serving until 1998. While in the Air Force, he worked as an intercontinental ballistic missile combat crew member in Missouri and at Air Force Space Command in Colorado Springs, Colorado. At the time of his retirement in 1998 he was the director of requirements with the Air Force Space Command.

After retiring from the military, Negron worked for defense contractors Lockheed Martin and General Dynamics before founding his own contracting firm Integron LLC in 2005.

== Politics ==
He was first elected as a Republican to the New Hampshire House of Representatives in November 2016 to represent District Hillsborough 32 for a two-year term. He came in third in the three-member district with 2,346 votes equal to 17.13% of the popular vote. Upon his election, he was named to the Election Law Committee in the legislature. in 2016 he hosted a house party for Carly Fiorina and was endorsed by her top supporters. Since being elected to the state legislature, Negron has not sponsored any legislation. According to other sources, he has served as a cosponsor on other pieces of legislation, but these bills were largely vetoed or died in committee. The one successful piece of legislation sponsored by Negron involved removing the limitation on a charter schools incurring long term debt.*^a

=== Congressional run ===
Midway into his first term in the state legislature, Negron announced a 2018 run as a Republican candidate for Congress in New Hampshire's 2nd congressional district. As of February 8, 2018, Negron was one of five remaining Republican candidates vying for their party's nomination.

His campaign raised just over $12,000, but he loaned his campaign an additional $130,000. As of 16 October 2017 He had given his campaign $21,000 and loaned it an additional $95,000.

In 2020, Negron gained the Republican nomination and in a rematch ran against Democratic representative Ann McLane Kuster.

== Personal life ==
Negron lives in Nashua with his wife Theresa (Terry). They have three children. He remains active in the community as well as his local Catholic Church. He is of Mexican and Puerto Rican ancestries.
