= Annie Kuster =

American politician (born 1956)

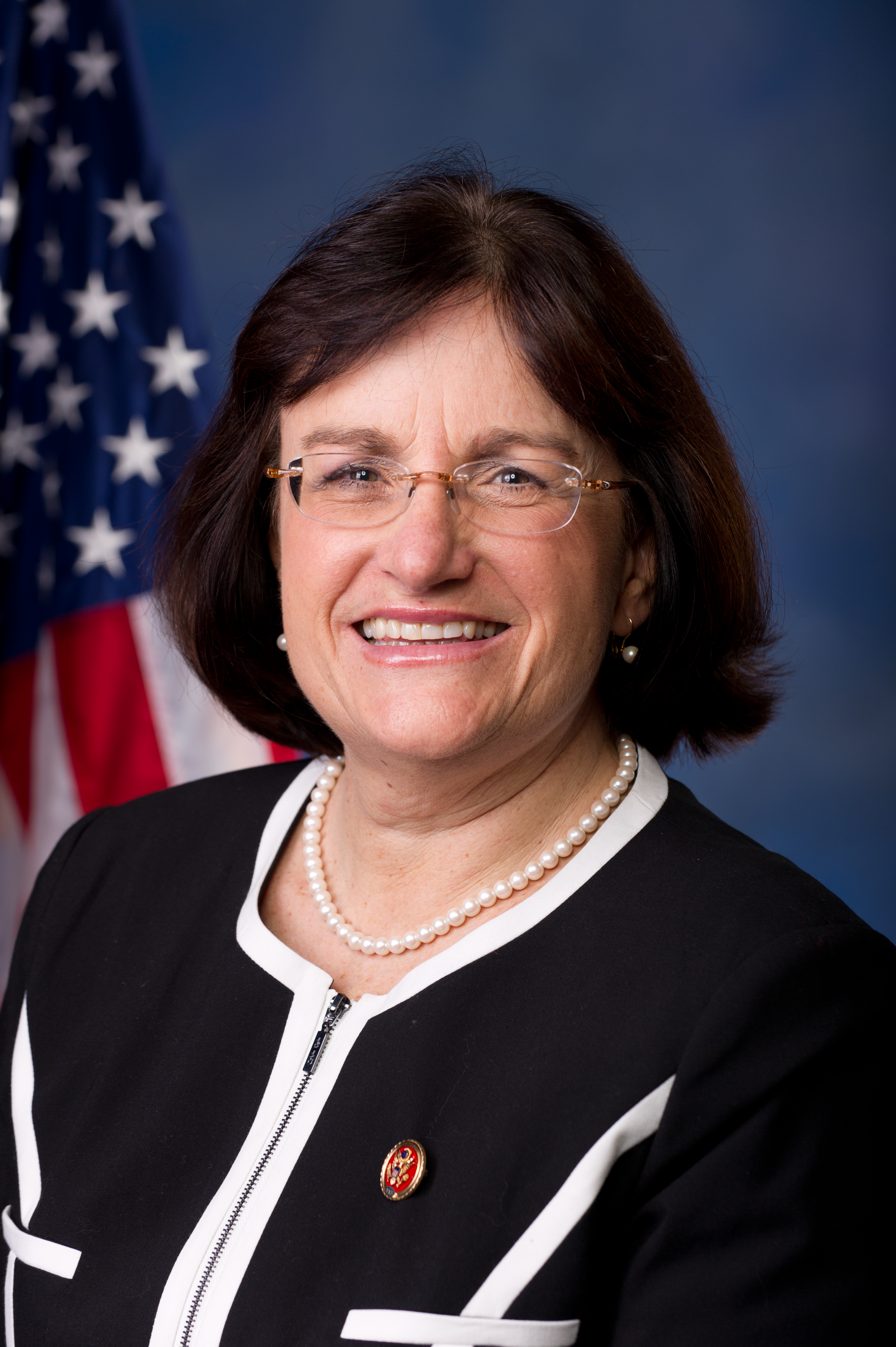
- Official portrait, 2013

Chair of the New Democrat Coalition
- In office January 3, 2023 – January 3, 2025
- Preceded by: Suzan DelBene
- Succeeded by: Brad Schneider

Member of the U.S. House of Representatives from New Hampshire's 2nd district
- In office January 3, 2013 – January 3, 2025
- Preceded by: Charles Bass
- Succeeded by: Maggie Goodlander

Personal details
- Born: Anne McLane; September 5, 1956 (age 70) Concord, New Hampshire, U.S.
- Party: Democratic
- Spouse: Brad Kuster
- Children: 2
- Relatives: Malcolm McLane (father); Susan Neidlinger (mother)
- Education: Dartmouth College (BA); Georgetown University (JD)
- Kuster's voice Kuster on New Hampshire's abortion restrictions. Recorded March 29, 2022

Ann L. McLane Kuster (born September 5, 1956) is an American lawyer and politician who served as the U.S. representative for New Hampshire's 2nd congressional district from 2013 to 2025. A member of the Democratic Party, she previously worked as a lobbyist.

Kuster chaired the New Democrat Coalition, a centrist caucus among House Democrats. On March 27, 2024, she announced that she would not seek re-election to a seventh term in office.

== Early life and education ==
Kuster was born in Concord, New Hampshire, on September 5, 1956. Both her parents were politicians. Her father, Malcolm McLane, was mayor of Concord, a member of the New Hampshire Executive Council, and an owner of Wildcat Mountain Ski Area. In 1972, he ran for governor of New Hampshire as an independent. He received 20% of the vote in an election that Republican Mel Thomson won with a plurality of 40%.

Kuster's mother, Susan McLane, was elected to the New Hampshire Senate as a Republican. In 1980, she ran for New Hampshire's 2nd congressional district, coming in second in the crowded Republican primary, with 25% of the vote. Judd Gregg won with 34% of the vote, while Charles Bass (whom Kuster defeated in 2012) came in third with 22%. Kuster's maternal great grandfather, John McLane, was governor of New Hampshire from 1905 to 1907. He was elected as a Republican in 1904 with 58% of the vote, defeating Democrat Henry Hollis.

Kuster graduated from Dartmouth College in 1978 with a degree in environmental policy. She received a J.D. from Georgetown University Law Center in 1984.

== Legal career ==
After college, Kuster became the director of Concord law firm Rath, Young and Pignatelli's education and nonprofit law practice group.

Kuster was a consultant and owner of Newfound Strategies LLC, a consulting firm.

Kuster also worked as an "of-counsel" partner at Rath, Young and Pignatelli. Her legal practice focused on education, nonprofit, and health care policy. Kuster has also worked as an adoption attorney.

Kuster has served as chair and board member of the Capitol Center for the Arts and as a founder and vice chair of the Women's Fund of New Hampshire. She has also served on the boards of the New Hampshire Charitable Foundation, New Hampshire Public Radio, Child and Family Services of New Hampshire, the Alumni Council and Tucker Foundation at Dartmouth College, and Womankind Counseling Center.

== Lobbying career ==
From 1989 to 2009, Kuster worked as a lobbyist in New Hampshire, earning more than $1.3 million in fees from various businesses and nonprofits. $460,000 of that money came from ambulatory surgical centers, $150,000 from investment companies, and $145,000 from pharmaceutical manufacturers and their association. In an editorial, the Union Leader wrote, "she's also a career lobbyist, not in dreaded Washington, but in Concord. But she's refused to use that word." Rather, Kuster called herself a "public policy advocate".

Kuster's career has also involved many years of lobbying on behalf of clients such as Merck Vaccines; the Pharmaceutical Research and Manufacturers of America (PhRMA), with which she helped created the NH Medication Bridge program, a public-private partnership that provides free prescriptions to patients in need; Fidelity Investments, with which she helped create the NH UNIQUE College Savings Plan to help families save money for college tax-free; Dartmouth College and Medical School; NARAL Pro-Choice New Hampshire; Bedford Ambulatory Surgical Center; and the New Hampshire College & University Council.

According to OpenSecrets, Kuster took $192,553 in contributions from lawyers and lobbyists during the 2010 election cycle.

=== Rohypnol ===
In 1998, while working on behalf of the pharmaceutical manufacturer Hoffman-LaRoche, Inc., Kuster lobbied against HB 1553. The bill would have reclassified three drugs, including Rohypnol, linked to date rapes, assaults, robberies, and driving offenses, as Schedule 1 Controlled Substances, making them illegal to possess. The University of New Hampshire Sexual Harassment and Rape Prevention Program's coordinator called the rescheduling of Rohypnol an "imperative", as the drug "poses an imminent and serious threat to public health and safety".

== Presidential campaigns ==
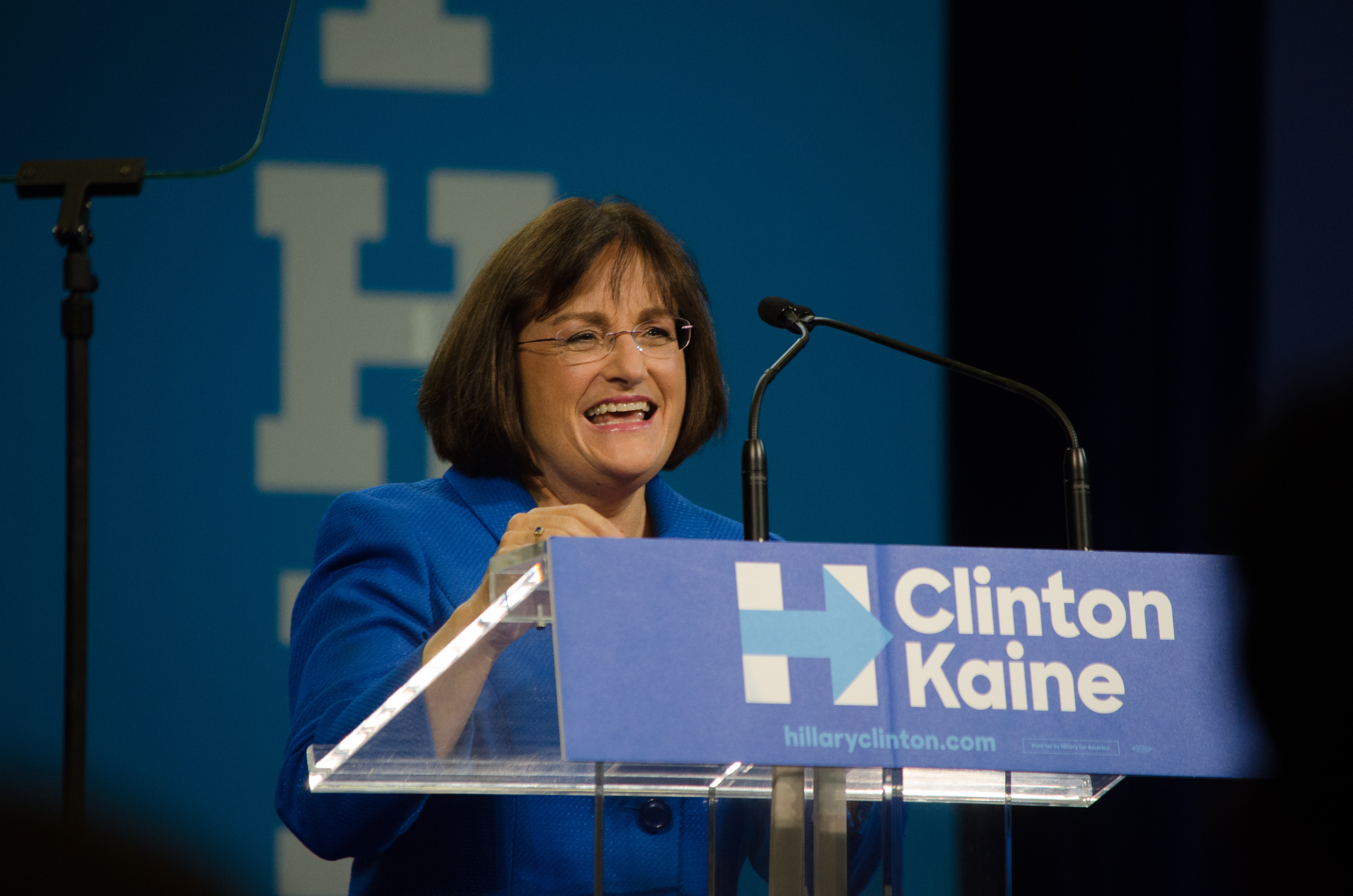
Kuster speaks at a Hillary Clinton presidential rally at Southern New Hampshire University in 2016.

Kuster served on the New Hampshire steering committees of the presidential campaigns of Barack Obama in 2007–08 and John Kerry in 2003–04. She and Peggo Hodes (the wife of Representative Paul Hodes) also co-chaired New Hampshire Women for Obama. Kuster was a 2008 delegate for Obama at the Democratic National Convention in Denver and a member of the 2004 New Hampshire Delegation in Boston. In 2020, Kuster endorsed Pete Buttigieg for president, which broke her streak of endorsing the candidate who became the Democratic nominee.

== U.S. House of Representatives ==
=== Elections ===
2010

In 2010, Kuster ran for New Hampshire's 2nd congressional district against Republican nominee Charles Bass, Libertarian nominee Howard Wilson, and Independent candidate Tim vanBlommesteyn. It was an open seat as Democratic incumbent Paul Hodes was running for the U.S. Senate.

Bass defeated Kuster 48%–47%, a margin of 3,550 votes.

2012

Kuster ran against Bass again in the 2012 election. She received the endorsement of Democracy for America, and was selected as one of its Dean Dozen.

On November 6, 2012, Kuster defeated Bass, 50%–45%. In doing so, she became a part of the nation's first all-female congressional delegation. It included Senator Jeanne Shaheen, Senator Kelly Ayotte, and Representative Carol Shea-Porter.

2014

Kuster ran for reelection in 2014 against Republican State Representative Marilinda Garcia. Kuster beat Garcia 55-45%. She was a member of the Democratic Congressional Campaign Committee Frontline Program, designed to help protect vulnerable Democratic incumbents in the 2014 elections. The primary election took place on September 9, and the general election on November 4. Republicans who ran in Kuster's district included Garcia and former State Senator Gary Lambert. Former U.N. ambassador John Bolton and his super PAC spent $30,000 on a two-week television ad buy opposing Kuster and her response to the 2012 attack in Benghazi, Libya.

2016

Kuster was reelected in 2016, defeating the Republican nominee, former State Representative Jim Lawrence, 50-45%.

2018

On June 12, Kuster announced she would seek a fourth term in Congress. She ran unopposed in the primary. Four Republicans, Robert Burns, Stewart Levenson, Jay Mercer, and Steve Negron, vied to run against her in the general election, while Tom Alciere filed as a Libertarian candidate. Levenson, reported the Associated Press, "was one of the doctors behind a 2017 whistleblower complaint about care" at the Manchester Veterans Affairs Medical Center, and had "accused Kuster, whom he approached about the issue, of being slow to act on it". Negron won the Republican primary with 27% of the vote. Kuster was reelected.

2020

Kuster ran for reelection to a fifth term. She defeated Joseph Mirzoeff, her sole Democratic challenger, in the primary. In the general election, she faced a rematch with Negron which she won with 53.91% of the vote.

=== Committee assignments ===
- Committee on Agriculture
  - Subcommittee on Conservation, Energy, and Forestry
  - Subcommittee on Horticulture, Research, Biotechnology, and Foreign Agriculture
- Committee on Small Business
  - Subcommittee on Investigations, Oversight and Regulations
- Committee on Veterans' Affairs
  - Subcommittee on Health
  - Subcommittee on Oversight and Investigations

=== Caucus memberships ===
Kuster was selected as the chair of the New Democrat Coalition for the 118th Congress. She was previously a vice chair of the caucus and a longstanding member of the moderate caucus.

- Congressional Arts Caucus
- Veterinary Medicine Caucus
- Climate Solutions Caucus
- Blue Collar Caucus
- Congressional Coalition on Adoption
- Congressional Caucus on Turkey and Turkish Americans
- Congressional Equality Caucus
- Congressional Ukraine Caucus

== Post-congressional career ==
In 2026, Kuster joined the advisory board of Mercury Public Affairs.

== Political positions ==
Kuster voted with President Joe Biden's stated position 100% of the time in the 117th Congress, according to a FiveThirtyEight analysis.

=== Libya ===
At a November 2013 Manchester town hall meeting, Kuster fielded questions about the Middle East. After reading a written question regarding establishing a select committee to investigate the terrorist attack in Benghazi, Kuster indicated that the questions "should stay focused on the Middle East". Audience members replied that Libya is in the "Middle East". Libya is generally not included in definitions of the Middle East, but it is part of the Arab world and the Arab Maghreb. The video quickly went viral online, gaining more than 260,000 views in less than 48 hours.

=== Health care ===
Kuster supported the Patient Protection and Affordable Care Act (PPACA). In a joint presentation in July 2017, she and Representative Peter Welch asserted the need to overcome partisan disagreement on Obamacare and to "find common ground in fixing Obamacare" by focusing on "individual markets".

=== Intelligence agencies and privacy ===
In November 2013, Kuster charged the National Security Agency, which had secretly tapped into data centers operated by Google and Yahoo, with violating privacy. "It just went way beyond what most people's expectations for privacy are in this country, and I think, despite people's best efforts to protect privacy, things had developed to a place where the American people now want to have a debate and have a conversation", she said. "It's a balancing act between privacy and safety and security of our country....But my point of view is we don't want to lose our liberty in the course of trying to protect our safety." This statement came days after she supported the USA Freedom Act, which would overhaul the NSA and curb its "worst excesses".

== Electoral history ==
New Hampshire's 2nd congressional district: Results 2012–2022
Year	Democratic	Votes	Pct	Republican	Votes	Pct	3rd Party	Party	Votes	Pct	
2010	Ann McLane Kuster	105,060	46.8%	Charles Bass	108,610	48.3%	Tim vanBlommesteyn	Independent	6,197	2.8%	*
2012	Ann McLane Kuster	169,275	50.2%	Charles Bass (incumbent)	152,977	45.3%	Hardy Macia	Libertarian	14,936	4.4%	*
2014	Ann McLane Kuster	130,700	54.9%	Marilinda Garcia	106,871	44.9%					*
2016	Ann McLane Kuster	174,495	49.7%	Jim Lawrence	158,973	45.3%	John Babiarz	Independent	17,088	4.9%	*
2018	Ann McLane Kuster	155,358	55.5%	Steve Negron	117,990	42.2%	Justin O'Donnell	Libertarian	6,206	2.2%	*
2020	Ann McLane Kuster	207,863	53.9%	Steve Negron	168,491	43.7%	Andrew Olding	Libertarian	9,093	2.4%	*
2022	Ann McLane Kuster	171,636	55.8%	Bob Burns	135,579	44.0%					

* Write-in and minor candidate notes: In 2010, Libertarian candidate Howard L. Wilson received 4,796 votes. In 2012, write-ins received 206 votes. In 2014, write-ins received 613 votes. In 2016, write-ins received 236 votes. In 2018, write-ins received 151 votes. In 2020, write-ins received 147 votes.

== Honors and awards ==
In 2000, Kuster received the Eleanor Roosevelt Award for "dedicated service to the Democratic Party at the local, state and national levels".

== Personal life ==
Kuster is married to Brad Kuster, a fellow lawyer. They reside in Hopkinton and have two sons.

Kuster and her mother, State Senator Susan McLane, coauthored a book, The Last Dance: Facing Alzheimer's with Love and Laughter. After her mother's death, Kuster and her father, Malcolm McLane, toured New Hampshire speaking publicly about aging and Alzheimer's disease and the resulting burdens on families and caregivers.

In February 2013, WMUR-TV reported that Kuster had been late paying property taxes on a home in Hopkinton starting in 2010 and had failed to pay two tax bills for a property in Jackson in 2012. After the report, Kuster said the bills were being paid. Kuster, whose assets have been estimated at $1.8 million, was reported to have been late on taxes six separate times since 2010, totaling $40,000 in back taxes. Kuster ultimately paid the taxes. When asked why she was consistently late, Kuster said, "Life is expensive."

On June 21, 2016, Kuster announced from the floor of the House that she had been sexually assaulted as a college student. She also said that when she was 23 and working as an aide on Capitol Hill, her boss took her to dinner with a "distinguished guest of the United States Congress" (South African heart surgeon Christiaan Barnard) who, under the table, put his hand under her skirt. Not long after, she was assaulted and mugged on a Washington street. She had never previously told anyone about these incidents. She said she had been motivated to come forward by a sexual assault case at Stanford University.

In Washington, Kuster lived with her close friend House Minority Whip Katherine Clark and other members.

== See also ==
- Women in the United States House of Representatives

U.S. House of Representatives
Preceded by Charles Bass	Member of the U.S. House of Representatives from New Hampshire's 2nd congressional district 2013–2025	Succeeded by Maggie Goodlander
Party political offices
Preceded by Suzan DelBene	Chair of the New Democrat Coalition; 2023–2025	Succeeded by Brad Schneider
U.S. order of precedence (ceremonial)
Preceded by Bob Inglis as Former U.S. Representative	Order of precedence of the United States as Former U.S. Representative	Succeeded by Tom Davis as Former U.S. Representative
