= Thomas Fitzpatrick (pilot) =

American aviator

- Born: Thomas Edward Fitzpatrick; April 24, 1930; Washington Heights, Manhattan, New York, U.S.
- Died: September 14, 2009 (aged 79); Westwood, New Jersey, U.S.
- Known for: Two intoxicated flights from New Jersey landing in New York City.
- Spouse: Helen Fitzpatrick
- Children: Thomas E. Fitzpatrick Jr, Daniel F. Fitzpatrick, and Stephen P. Fitzpatrick
- Awards: Purple Heart
- Aviation career
- Famous flights: "Late Night Flight"

Thomas Edward Fitzpatrick (April 24, 1930 – September 14, 2009), nicknamed Tommy Fitz, was an American pilot known for two intoxicated flights where he flew from New Jersey and landed on the streets of New York City.

In 1956, Fitzpatrick, age 26, first stole a single-engine Cessna 140, on a dare made at the local tavern. The plane was found in the middle of St. Nicholas Ave and 191st Street. Fitzpatrick was brought to Felony Court on suspicion of grand larceny and violation of the city's administrative code. Two years later, he stole another plane, a Cessna 120, and landed it a few blocks away, at Amsterdam Avenue and 187th Street. Multiple witnesses saw Fitzpatrick land the second plane. He was then charged for the same crimes again.

== Flights ==
While intoxicated, Fitzpatrick, a resident of Emerson, New Jersey, stole a single-engine plane from the Teterboro School of Aeronautics at Teterboro Airport in New Jersey at approximately 3 a.m. on September 30, 1956. He flew without lights or radio before landing on St. Nicholas Avenue near 191st Street, in front of a New York City bar where he had earlier been drinking, after having made an intoxicated barroom bet that he could travel from New Jersey to New York City in 15 minutes. It was reported that Fitzpatrick's goal may have been to land on the field of George Washington High School, but the lack of lighting there forced a change in landing.

The New York Times called the flight a "feat of aeronautics" and a "fine landing". For his illegal flight, he was fined $100 (equivalent to $1,180 in 2025) after the plane's owner refused to press charges.

On October 4, 1958, just before 1 a.m., Fitzpatrick, again intoxicated, stole another plane from the same airfield, and landed on Amsterdam Avenue and 187th Street in front of a Yeshiva University building, after another bar patron disbelieved his first feat. For his second stolen flight, Judge John A. Mullen sentenced him to six months in prison, stating, "Had you been properly jolted then, it's possible this would not have occurred a second time." Fitzpatrick said "it's the lousy drink" that caused him to attempt the stunt.

== Personal life ==
Fitzpatrick worked as a steamfitter with the Enterprise association of steamfitters Local 638 of New York City & Long Island for 51 years. According to Fitzpatrick's brother, Fitzpatrick lied about his age in order to serve in World War II and joined the US Marine Corps at the age of 15, fighting in China. Before being discharged from the Marines two years after World War II, Fitzpatrick learned to fly a reconnaissance aircraft. He then joined the US Army and was stationed in Japan. He was scheduled to return home when the Korean War began. Fitzpatrick became the first person from New York City to be wounded in Korea. According to one report, "he was wounded while driving an ammunition truck to rescue some American soldiers trapped by Communist fire". He received a Purple Heart for his service. He was a member of the Township of Washington Golden Seniors, Our Lady of Good Counsel Men's Group, VFW Post # 6192 of Washington Township and the China-Marines Organization.

== Death ==
A resident of Washington Township, Bergen County, New Jersey, Fitzpatrick died of cancer on September 14, 2009, at the age of 79. He was survived by his three sons, Thomas E. Jr, Daniel F., and Stephen P. Fitzpatrick, and his wife of 51 years, Helen (Fratinardo) Fitzpatrick.

== Legacy ==
Fitzpatrick has a mixed drink named after him for his feat called the "Late Night Flight" which is supposed to create a layered representation of NYC's nighttime sky.
