= John J. Mullen =

John J. Mullen can refer to:

- John J. Mullen (American football), American football coach
- John J. Mullen (mayor), American politician
