= William Fowler (New Hampshire politician) =

American politician

Member of the New Hampshire House of Representatives from the 20th Rockingham district
- In office December 5, 2018 – December 2020

Personal details
- Born: Seabrook, New Hampshire
- Party: Republican
- Education: McIntosh College (AA)

Military service
- Branch/service: United States Army
- Rank: Sergeant

William Fowler (born) is an American politician serving as a member of the New Hampshire House of Representatives from the 20th Rockingham district.

== Early life and education ==
Fowler was born and raised in Seabrook, New Hampshire. He joined the Army National Guard in 1987 and retired with the rank of staff sergeant. He earned an associate degree in criminal justice from McIntosh College. He later earned a certificate in microcomputer technology from Southern New Hampshire University and another in forensic science and crime scene investigation from Kaplan University.

== Career ==
Prior to entering politics, Fowler worked in private security for 25 years.

A member of the Republican Party, Fowler assumed office on December 5, 2018. Fowler was a candidate for New Hampshire's 1st congressional district in the 2020 election, but withdrew and endorsed Republican candidate Matt Mowers.
