= Chris Christie presidential campaign =

Chris Christie has unsuccessfully run for president two times; it may refer to:

- Chris Christie 2016 presidential campaign
- Chris Christie 2024 presidential campaign
