= John McMullen =

John McMullen may refer to:

- John McMullen (bishop) (1832–1883), first bishop of Davenport, Iowa
- John McMullen (broadcaster), American radio and internet broadcaster
- John McMullen (engineer) (1918–2005), engineer and owner of two sports teams
- John McMullen (politician) (1843–1922), Wisconsin state senator
- John K. McMullen, USAF officer
- John A. McMullen (born 1941), Vermont businessman and political candidate

== See also ==
- John Mullen (disambiguation)
- John J. McMullen & Associates, a naval architecture firm in the United States
- Jack McMullen (born 1991), actor
