= Samantha O'Loughlin =

American politician

Member-elect of the New Hampshire House of Representatives from the Hillsborough 10th district
- Assuming office December 2026
- Succeeding: Bill Ohm

Personal details
- Party: Democratic

Samantha O'Loughlin is an American politician. A member of the Democratic Party, she is the member-elect for the Hillsborough 10th district of the New Hampshire House of Representatives.
