= 2020 United States House of Representatives elections in New Hampshire =

- November 3, 2020

All 2 New Hampshire seats to the United States House of Representatives
	Majority party	Minority party
Party	Democratic	Republican
Last election	2	0
Seats won	2	0
Seat change	Steady	Steady
Popular vote	413,469	353,650
Percentage	52.59%	44.98%
Swing	▼1.94%	▲1.36%

Democratic
40–50%
50–60%
60–70%
70–80%
80–90%
90–100%
Republican
40–50%
50–60%
60–70%
70–80%

The 2020 United States House of Representatives elections in New Hampshire were held on November 3, 2020, to elect the two U.S. representatives from the state of New Hampshire, one from each of the state's two congressional districts. The elections coincided with the 2020 U.S. presidential election, as well as other elections to the House of Representatives, elections to the United States Senate and various state and local elections.

== Overview ==
District	Democratic		Republican		Others		Total		Result
District	Votes	%	Votes	%	Votes	%	Votes	%	Result
District 1	205,606	51.32%	185,159	46.21%	9,896	2.47%	400,661	100.0%	Democratic hold
District 2	208,289	53.91%	168,886	43.70%	9,266	2.40%	386,441	100.0%	Democratic hold
Total	413,469	52.59%	353,650	44.98%	19,136	2.43%	787,102	100.0%	

Popular vote
Democratic	52.59%
Republican	44.98%
Other	2.43%

House seats
Democratic	100.00%

== District 1 ==
2020 New Hampshire's 1st congressional district election
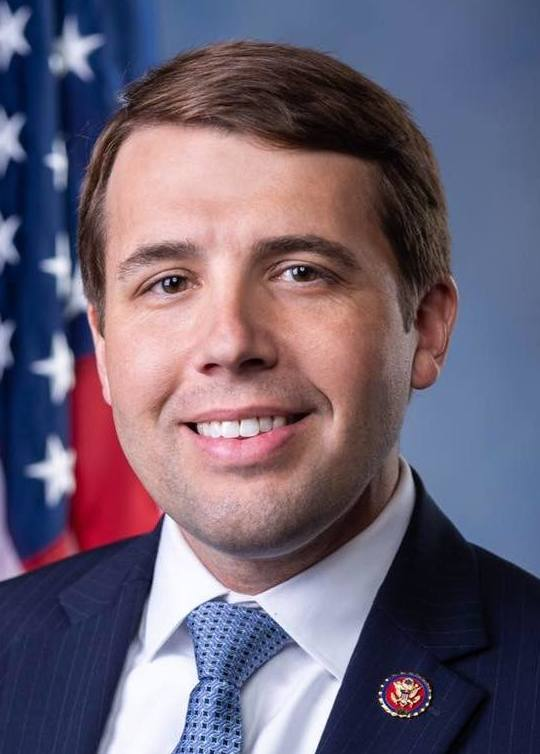

Nominee	Chris Pappas	Matt Mowers
Party	Democratic	Republican
Popular vote	205,606	185,159
Percentage	51.3%	46.2%
- Municipality results Pappas: 50–60% 60–70% 70–80% Mowers: 50–60% 60–70% 70–80%
U.S. Representative before election
Chris Pappas
Democratic
Elected U.S. Representative
Chris Pappas
Democratic

The 1st district is based in southeastern New Hampshire, and includes Greater Manchester, the Seacoast and the Lakes Region. The incumbent was Democrat Chris Pappas, who was elected with 53.6% of the vote in 2018.

=== Democratic primary ===
==== Candidates ====
===== Nominee =====
- Chris Pappas, incumbent U.S. Representative

===== Endorsements =====
Chris Pappas

U.S. presidents

- Barack Obama, 44th president of the United States (2009–2017), U.S. senator from Illinois (2005–2008)

Organizations

- League of Conservation Voters Action Fund
- LGBTQ Victory Fund
- Sierra Club

==== Primary results ====
Democratic primary results
Party	Candidate	Votes	%
Democratic	Chris Pappas (incumbent)	70,643	100.0
Total votes		70,643	100.0

=== Republican primary ===
==== Candidates ====
===== Nominee =====
- Matt Mowers, former executive director of the New Hampshire Republican Party and former U.S. State Department staffer

===== Eliminated in primary =====
- Michael Callis
- Jeff Denaro
- Matt Mayberry, U.S. Air Force veteran and former Dover city councilor
- Kevin Rondeau

===== Withdrawn =====
- William Fowler, state representative (endorsed Mowers)

===== Declined =====
- Eddie Edwards, former police chief of South Hampton, former chief of the New Hampshire State Division of Liquor Enforcement, and nominee for New Hampshire's 1st congressional district in 2018

==== Endorsements ====
Matt Mayberry

Federal officials

- Jeb Bradley, former U.S. representative from this district (2003–2007)

State officials

- Craig Benson, former governor of New Hampshire (2003–2005)
- Ruth Griffin, former member of the Executive Council of New Hampshire (1987–2007)
- Tom Rath, former Attorney General of New Hampshire (1978–1980)

State legislators

- Keith Ammon, former state representative from the Hillsborough 40th district (2014–2018)
- David Boutin, former state senator (2010–2016)
- Sharon Carson, state senator from the 14th district
- Bob Clegg, former state senator (2002–2008)
- Harold French, state senator from the 7th district
- Dennis Green, state representative
- Bob Giuda, state senator from the 2nd district
- Dan Innis, former state senator (2016–2018)
- Sean Morrison, former state representative (2016–2019)
- Chuck Morse, Minority Leader of the New Hampshire Senate
- Jason Osborne, state representative from the Rockingham 4th district
- John Reagan, state senator from the 17th district
- Ruth Ward, state senator from the 8th district
- Ken Weyler, state representative from the Rockingham 13th district
Matt Mowers

Federal officials

- Kevin McCarthy, House Minority Leader and Representative for California's 23rd congressional district
- Donald Trump, 45th president of the United States

State officials

- Chris Sununu, Governor of New Hampshire (2017–present)

Organizations

- Tea Party Express, conservative PAC

==== Polling ====
Poll source	Date(s) administered	Sample size (Note: Key: A – all adults RV – registered voters LV – likely voters V – unclear)	Margin of error	Matt Mayberry	Matt Mowers	Other	Undecided
University of New Hampshire	August 28 – September 1, 2020	323 (LV)	–	17%	48%	0% (Note: "Another candidate" with 0%)	34%
Saint Anselm College	August 15–17, 2020	261 (RV)	± 6.1%	12%	23%	8% (Note: "Someone else" with 8%)	57%

==== Debate ====
2020 New Hampshire's 1st congressional district republican primary debate
No.	Date	Host	Moderator	Link	Republican	Republican
Key: P Participant A Absent N Not invited I Invited W Withdrawn						
Key: P Participant A Absent N Not invited I Invited W Withdrawn					Matt Mayberry	Matt Mowers
1	Sep. 2, 2020	New Hampshire Institute of Politics; WMUR	Adam Sexton		P	P

==== Primary results ====
Republican primary results
Party	Candidate	Votes	%
Republican	Matt Mowers	41,100	59.4
Republican	Matt Mayberry	18,479	26.7
Republican	Kevin Rondeau	4,203	6.1
Republican	Jeff Denaro	2,723	3.9
Republican	Michael Callis	2,703	3.9
Total votes		69,208	100.0

=== Libertarian primary ===
==== Candidates ====
===== Declared =====
- Zachary Dumont, Newmarket town councilor

=== General election ===
==== Debates ====
2020 New Hampshire's 1st congressional district debates
No.	Date	Host	Moderator	Link	Democratic	Republican	Libertarian
Key: P Participant A Absent N Not invited I Invited W Withdrawn							
Key: P Participant A Absent N Not invited I Invited W Withdrawn					Chris Pappas	Matt Mowers	Zachary Dumont
1	October 7, 2020	NHPR; New Hampshire PBS	Peter Biello; Laura Knoy		P	P	N
1	October 21, 2020	New Hampshire Institute of Politics; WMUR			P	P	N

==== Predictions ====
Source	Ranking	As of
The Cook Political Report	Likely D	August 14, 2020
Inside Elections	Likely D	August 7, 2020
Sabato's Crystal Ball	Likely D	October 8, 2020
Politico	Lean D	July 6, 2020
Daily Kos	Likely D	October 26, 2020
RCP	Lean D	June 9, 2020
Niskanen	Safe D	July 26, 2020

==== Polling ====
View source data.

Poll source	Date(s) administered	Sample size	Margin of error	Chris Pappas (D)	Matt Mowers (R)	Other	Undecided
University of New Hampshire	October 24–28, 2020	451 (LV)	± 4.6%	48%	50%	2% (Note: Dumont (L) with 2%; "Other" with no voters)	0%
Saint Anselm College	October 23–26, 2020	560 (LV)	± 4.1%	49%	44%	2% (Note: Dumont (L) and "Someone else" with 1%)	5%
University of New Hampshire	October 9–12, 2020	477 (LV)	± 4.5%	53%	43%	1% (Note: Dumont (L) with 1%; "Another Candidate" with no voters)	3%
Saint Anselm College	October 1–4, 2020	595 (LV)	± 4%	49%	41%	3% (Note: Olding (L) with 2%; "Someone else" with 1%)	7%
University of New Hampshire	September 24–28, 2020	504 (LV)	± 4.4%	56%	38%	2% (Note: Dumont (L) with 2%; "Another Candidate" with no voters)	4%
University of New Hampshire	August 28 – September 1, 2020	925 (LV)	–	52%	34%	2% (Note: Dumont (L) with 1%; "Another candidate" with 1%)	12%

Hypothetical polling

with Matt Mayberry

Poll source	Date(s) administered	Sample size	Margin of error	Chris Pappas (D)	Matt Mayberry (R)	Other	Undecided
University of New Hampshire	August 28 – September 1, 2020	926 (LV)	–	52%	34%	2%	12%

Generic Democrat vs Generic Republican

Poll source	Date(s) administered	Sample size	Margin of error	Generic Democrat	Generic Republican	Other	Undecided
Saint Anselm College	June 13–16, 2020	567 (RV)	± 4.1%	48%	42%	2%	8%
Saint Anselm College	April 23–27, 2020	442 (RV)	± 4.7%	49%	43%	1%	6%

==== Results ====
New Hampshire's 1st congressional district, 2020
Party	Candidate	Votes	%
Democratic	Chris Pappas (incumbent)	205,606	51.3
Republican	Matt Mowers	185,159	46.2
Libertarian	Zachary Dumont	9,747	2.4
N/A	Scatter	149	0.0
Total votes		400,661	100.0
Democratic hold			

== District 2 ==
2020 New Hampshire's 2nd congressional district election
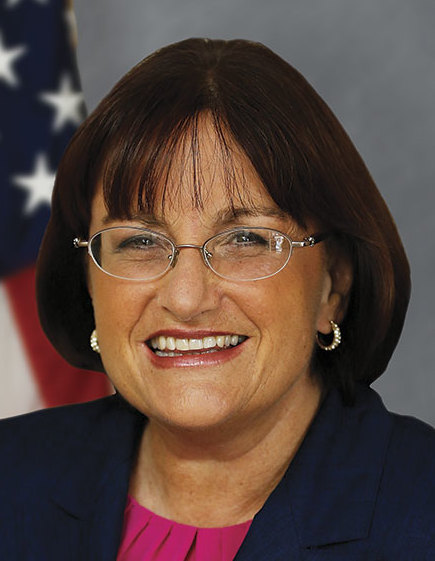

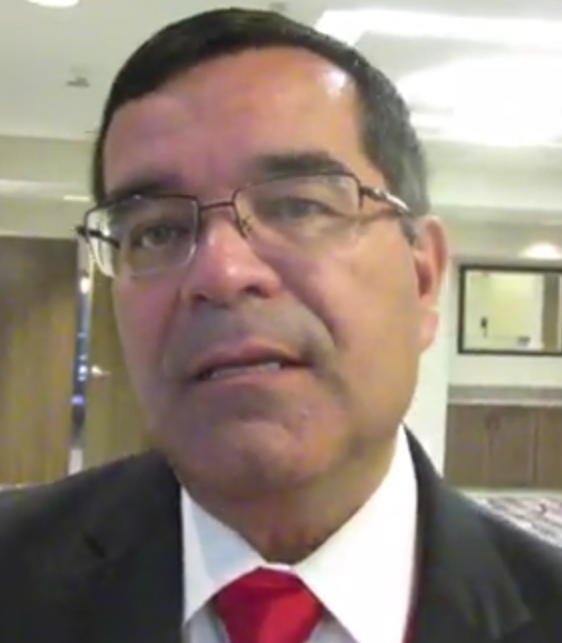
Nominee	Annie Kuster	Steve Negron
Party	Democratic	Republican
Popular vote	207,863	168,491
Percentage	53.9%	43.7%
- Municipality results Kuster: 40–50% 50–60% 60–70% 70–80% 80–90% 90–100% Negron: 40–50% 50–60% 60–70% 70–80%
U.S. Representative before election
Annie Kuster
Democratic
Elected U.S. Representative
Annie Kuster
Democratic

The 2nd district encompasses western and northern New Hampshire, and includes the cities of Nashua and Concord. The incumbent was Democrat Annie Kuster, who was re-elected with 55.3% of the vote in 2018.

=== Democratic primary ===
==== Candidates ====
===== Nominee =====
- Annie Kuster, incumbent U.S. representative

===== Eliminated in primary =====
- Joseph Mirzoeff

==== Primary results ====
Democratic primary results
Party	Candidate	Votes	%
Democratic	Annie Kuster (incumbent)	71,358	92.8
Democratic	Joseph Mirzoeff	5,500	7.2
Total votes		76,858	100.0

=== Republican primary ===
==== Candidates ====
===== Nominee =====
- Steve Negron, former state representative and nominee for this seat in 2018

===== Eliminated in primary =====
- Matthew Bjelobrk, Haverhill town selectman
- Lynne Blankenbeker, former state representative and candidate for this district in 2018
- Eli Clemmer, school media specialist

==== Polling ====
Poll source	Date(s) administered	Sample size	Margin of error	Lynn Blankenbeker	Steve Negron	Other	Undecided
University of New Hampshire	August 28 – September 1, 2020	367 (LV)	–	20%	50%	1% (Note: "Another candidate" with 1%)	29%
Saint Anselm College	August 15–17, 2020	216 (RV)	± 6.7%	15%	37%	4% (Note: "Someone else" with 4%)	44%

==== Primary results ====
Republican primary results
Party	Candidate	Votes	%
Republican	Steve Negron	30,503	48.3
Republican	Lynne Blankenbeker	24,464	38.7
Republican	Matthew Bjelobrk	4,381	6.9
Republican	Eli Clemmer	3,850	6.1
Total votes		63,198	100.0

==== Endorsements ====
Annie Kuster (D)

U.S. presidents

- Barack Obama, 44th president of the United States (2009–2017), U.S. senator from Illinois (2005–2008)

Local officials

- Pete Buttigieg, former mayor of South Bend, Indiana (2012–2020), and former candidate for 2020 Democratic presidential nomination

Organizations

- J Street PAC
- League of Conservation Voters Action Fund
- Planned Parenthood Action Fund
- Sierra Club
Steve Negron (R)

U.S. presidents

- Donald Trump, 45th president of the United States

Organizations

- Maggie's List

=== Libertarian primary ===
==== Candidates ====
===== Declared =====
- Andrew Olding

=== General election ===
==== Debate ====
2022 New Hampshire's 2nd congressional district debate
No.	Date	Host	Moderator	Link	Democratic	Republican	Libertarian
Key: P Participant A Absent N Not invited I Invited W Withdrawn							
Key: P Participant A Absent N Not invited I Invited W Withdrawn					Annie Kuster	Steve Negron	Andrew Olding
1	October 22, 2020	New Hampshire Institute of Politics; WMUR			P	P	N

==== Predictions ====
Source	Ranking	As of
The Cook Political Report	Safe D	August 5, 2020
Inside Elections	Safe D	August 7, 2020
Sabato's Crystal Ball	Likely D	July 23, 2020
Politico	Likely D	July 6, 2020
Daily Kos	Safe D	July 21, 2020
RCP	Lean D	October 24, 2020
Niskanen	Safe D	July 26, 2020

==== Polling ====
View source data.

Poll source	Date(s) administered	Sample size	Margin of error	Annie Kuster (D)	Steve Negron (R)	Andrew Olding (L)	Other	Undecided
University of New Hampshire	October 24–28, 2020	451 (LV)	± 4.6%	51%	41%	7%	0% (Note: "Other" with no voters)	1%
Saint Anselm College	October 23–26, 2020	458 (LV)	± 4.6%	54%	39%	3%	1% (Note: "Someone else" with 1%)	3%
University of New Hampshire	October 9–12, 2020	410 (LV)	± 4.8%	49%	45%	2%	0%	3%
Saint Anselm College	October 1–4, 2020	552 (LV)	± 4.1%	52%	38%	4%	2% (Note: "Someone else" with 2%)	5%
University of New Hampshire	September 24–28, 2020	463 (LV)	± 4.5%	48%	42%	5%	0%	5%
University of New Hampshire	August 28 – September 1, 2020	917 (LV)	–	52%	40%	2%	3% (Note: "Another candidate" with 3%)	4%

Hypothetical polling

with Lynne Blankenbeker

Poll source	Date(s) administered	Sample size	Margin of error	Annie Kuster (D)	Lynne Blankenbeker (R)	Other	Undecided
University of New Hampshire	August 28 – September 1, 2020	920 (LV)	–	52%	39%	5% (Note: "Another candidate" with 3%; Olding (L) with 2%)	5%

Generic Democrat vs Generic Republican

Poll source	Date(s) administered	Sample size	Margin of error	Generic Democrat	Generic Republican	Other	Undecided
Saint Anselm College	Jun 13–16, 2020	505 (RV)	± 4.4%	44%	44%	3%	9%
Saint Anselm College	Apr 23–27, 2020	378 (RV)	± 5%	47%	41%	5%	7%

==== Results ====
New Hampshire's 2nd congressional district, 2020
Party	Candidate	Votes	%
Democratic	Annie Kuster (incumbent)	208,289	53.9
Republican	Steve Negron	168,886	43.7
Libertarian	Andrew Olding	9,119	2.4
N/A	Scatter	147	0.0
Total votes		386,441	100.0
Democratic hold			

== See also ==
- 2020 New Hampshire elections
