= Malcolm McLane =

American politician

Member of the New Hampshire Executive Council from the 2nd district
- In office 1977–1982
- Preceded by: James Hayes
- Succeeded by: Peter Spaulding

Mayor of Concord, New Hampshire
- In office 1970–1976
- Preceded by: William Gove
- Succeeded by: Martin Gross

Personal details
- Born: October 3, 1924 Manchester, New Hampshire, U.S.
- Died: February 2, 2008 (aged 83) Hanover, New Hampshire, U.S.
- Spouse: Susan Neidlinger
- Education: Dartmouth College; Harvard University

Military service
- Allegiance: United States
- Branch/service: United States Army: Army Air Forces
- Battles/wars: World War II

Malcolm McLane (October 3, 1924 – February 2, 2008) was an American businessman, politician, and lawyer.

Born in Manchester, New Hampshire, McLane served as a pilot in the United States Army Air Forces during World War II. He spent the last months of World War II in a German prisoner of war camp after his plane was shot down during the Battle of the Bulge in December 1944. He graduated from Dartmouth College and Harvard Law School. McLane was a Rhodes Scholar. He then practiced law in Concord, New Hampshire. He helped start the Wildcat Mountain Ski Area in Pinkham Notch, New Hampshire. McLane served on the Concord City Council. In 1972, McLane ran for Governor of New Hampshire as an Independent. Then, from 1970 to 1976, McLane served as mayor of Concord. McLane served on the New Hampshire Executive Council from 1977 to 1982. John McLane, Governor of New Hampshire, was his grandfather. His wife Susan McLane served in the New Hampshire General Court, and their daughter Ann McLane Kuster is the former representative from New Hampshire's 2nd congressional district. McLane died at his home in Hanover, New Hampshire.

== See also ==
- List of mayors of Concord, New Hampshire
