= Lynne Blankenbeker =

American politician (born 1964)

Member of the New Hampshire House of Representatives from the Merrimack 11th district
- In office December 7, 2009 – December 7, 2012
- Preceded by: Tara Reardon
- Succeeded by: Steve Shurtleff

Personal details
- Born: March 3, 1964 (age 62)
- Party: Republican
- Education: Troy University (BS); Franklin Pierce Law Center (JD)

Lynne Ferrari Blankenbeker is an American politician and United States Navy captain.

Blankenbeker ran for the New Hampshire House of Representatives in 2008, but finished in seventh for the five positions. She ran in a special election for the New Hampshire House in 2009 after Tara Reardon resigned her seat, and won. She did not run for reelection in 2012 after she was recalled for duty in the U.S. Navy.

In the 2018 elections, Blankenbeker ran unsuccessfully for a seat in the U.S. House of Representatives for New Hampshire's 2nd congressional district. She is running again in the 2020 elections.

During the COVID-19 pandemic, she was deployed to the USNS Comfort.
