= Chris Christie: The Inside Story of His Rise to Power =

Political profile by Bob Ingle and Michael G. Symons

First edition (publ. St. Martin's Press)

Chris Christie: The Inside Story of His Rise to Power is a political profile of New Jersey Governor Chris Christie by Bob Ingle and Michael G. Symons, two experienced journalists.

== United States Attorney ==
Christie was told that President Bush had decided to nominate him for appointment to his first political job, United States Attorney for New Jersey, on September 10, 2001. Ingle and Symons write that the appointee might have faced a political battle, but that the September 11 attacks made New Jersey's Democratic senators, Jon Corzine and Robert Toricelli decide to give President Bush the personnel he wanted as the Bush administration worked to respond to Islamist terrorism.

Christie used his position as United States Attorney for New Jersey not only to prosecute terrorism cases, but to uncover and prosecute political corruption. Each year he held the Office, his staff prosecuted more cases than it had done the year before. According to Ingle and Symons, Christie left office not only as the longest serving, but as arguably the "most successful U.S. attorney in New Jersey history."

== Alleged Planned Parenthood donation ==
Ingle and Symons report that in the mid-90s, when Christie opposed county funding for Planned Parenthood on budgetary grounds, he stated that he supported it ideologically. By their account, Christie stated that “I support Planned Parenthood privately with my personal contribution.” However, in 2016, a Christie spokeswoman stated: “The governor didn’t donate to Planned Parenthood.”

According to The Wall Street Journal, early in his career Christie described himself as pro-choice; he later became pro-life.

== See also ==
- American Governor: Chris Christie's Bridge to Redemption
- Double Down: Game Change 2012
