= Susan McLane =

American politician

Member of the New Hampshire Senate
- In office 1981–1995

Member of the New Hampshire House of Representatives
- In office 1969–1981

Personal details
- Born: Susan Neidlinger; September 28, 1929 Boston, Massachusetts, U.S.
- Died: February 13, 2005 (aged 75) Concord, New Hampshire, U.S.
- Party: Democratic
- Spouse: Malcolm McLane
- Relations: Ann McLane Kuster (daughter)
- Parent: Lloyd Neidlinger
- Education: Mount Holyoke College; Harvard University

Susan McLane (née Neidlinger) (September 28, 1929 – February 13, 2005) was an American politician.

== Early life and education ==
Born in Boston, Massachusetts in 1929 McLane graduated from Hanover High School in Hanover, New Hampshire in 1947. She then attended Mount Holyoke College In 1981, McLane returned to school and studied at the John F. Kennedy School of Government.

== Career ==
From 1969 to 1981, McLane served in the New Hampshire House of Representatives. In 1980, McLane unsuccessfully ran for United States Congress, competing in the Republican primary against Charles Bass and Judd Gregg. Gregg eventually won the election, and Bass was elected to congress in 1995. In 2010, Bass was defeated by McLane's daughter, Ann.

From 1981 to 1995, McLane served in the New Hampshire Senate. Originally a Republican, McLane later became an independent and a Democrat.

== Political beliefs ==
McLane was described as a liberal Republican who supported abortion rights and income tax.

== Personal life ==
She married Malcolm McLane, a businessman and politician, and lived Concord, New Hampshire from 1952 until her death from Alzheimer's disease in 2005. McLane's daughter is Ann McLane Kuster, a congresswoman who represented New Hampshire's 2nd congressional district from 2013 to 2025.

== Notes ==
- Appearances on C-SPAN
