= McIntosh College =

Educational institution

Coordinates: 43°11′06″N 70°53′0″W

- Type: Private, For Profit
- Active: 1896–2009
- Location: Dover, New Hampshire, United States
- Website: www.mcintoshcollege.edu

McIntosh College, founded in 1896, was an educational institution located in Dover, New Hampshire. It granted Associate's degrees and Bachelor's degrees in a variety of vocational areas, including business management, criminal justice, culinary arts, graphic design and massage therapy. The college closed in 2009.

== History ==
McIntosh College was founded by A.D. Bliss in 1896 under the name of Dover Business College. David McIntosh, CPA, purchased the school in 1902 and renamed it.

In 1967, McIntosh was authorized by the State of New Hampshire with the approval of the Post-Secondary Education Commission to offer graduates degrees in Business Science. In 1988 the College became accredited by the New England Association of Schools and Colleges.

Starting in 1999, it was operated by the Career Education Corporation, a for-profit post-secondary education provider.

=== Closure ===
Career Education Corporation announced on November 15, 2006, that it was going to sell several colleges that it owned, including McIntosh College. On February 15, 2008, CEC announced a plan to let current students complete programs. The college was closed in 2009.

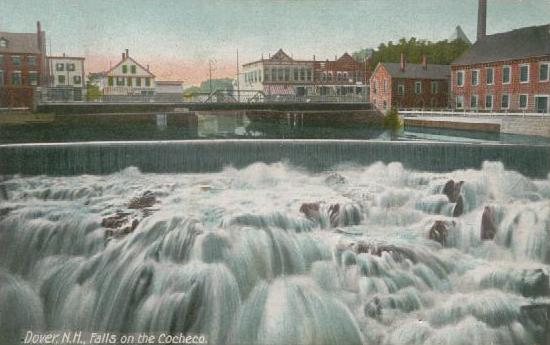
Falls on the Cocheco River in Dover, New Hampshire

== Campus ==
The McIntosh campus comprised several buildings spread out over 11 acres (45,000 m^{2}) in a residential area of Dover. Most programs, including the library and administrative offices, were housed in the central building. The library also housed art exhibitions, guest speakers and cultural events. The Academy of Design and Technology and the Culinary Arts Academy had their own facilities located in outlying buildings.

The dorm building was a converted hotel housing generally four to six students per room, depending on room size. The smallest rooms housed two students. The dorm building also served as the college's financial aid building, with the largest rooms used as their office space. It was situated next to the culinary arts building.

The buildings containing the admissions office and the massage school have been put up for sale by CEC. As of 2009, three of the campus buildings belong to one-time college president Robert DeColfmacker, and there is an outstanding lease running until 2016. There have been local efforts to interest another New Hampshire college in setting up a branch campus or otherwise redevelop the property.
