= Herbert Richardson (politician) =

American politician

Member of New Hampshire House of Representatives for Coos 4
- In office 2008–2018

Member of New Hampshire House of Representatives for Coos 2
- In office 2002–2006

Personal details
- Born: 1951
- Died: March 7, 2023 (aged 72)
- Party: Democratic (after 2018)
- Other political affiliations: Republican (until 2018)

Herbert "Herb" Douglas Richardson (1951 – March 7, 2023) was an American politician. He was a member of the New Hampshire House of Representatives representing Coos County. He served on local school boards and as a selectman. In May 2018, Richardson changed his affiliation from the Republican Party to the Democratic Party.
