= Jerry Little =

American serial killer (1956–1994)

- Born: Jerry Lee Little, Jr. 1956; Marks, Mississippi, U.S.
- Died: February 18, 1994 (aged 37–38); Centerfield, Utah, U.S.
- Convictions: First degree murder (3 counts); Second degree murder Forcible rape (2 counts); Robbery (2 counts); Attempted rape
- Penalty: Life imprisonment

Details
- Victims: 4
- Span of crimes: 1985–1988
- Country: United States
- State: Missouri
- Date apprehended: August 4, 1988

Jerry Lee Little Jr. (1956 – February 18, 1994) was an American serial killer who killed four women in St. Louis, Missouri between 1985 and 1988. At the time of his arrest, the 32-year-old was an avid recidivist who had spent more than 17 years of his life behind bars. In 1990, he was sentenced to life imprisonment.

== Biography ==
Jerry Little was born in 1956 in Marks, Mississippi, into a family of six total children. Four years after his birth, his family moved to St. Louis, Missouri, where his father soon died. He was brought up by his mother. In the late 1960s, due to chronic absences and poor academic performance, Little dropped out of school after graduating from the 6th grade and thereafter began leading a criminal lifestyle. In 1971, he was arrested on rape charges, convicted and sentenced to five years imprisonment by the juvenile court. He was paroled in 1974. A few weeks after his release, Little took part in a robbery and gang rape, for which he was again convicted and sentenced to 20 years imprisonment at the Missouri Eastern Correctional Center. In early 1984, he was paroled again, and Jerry married a girl he had met during his imprisonment. Although he found himself a job and got a house, due to his lack of education, he was forced to engage in low-skilled labor for the next two years. In 1986, he moved to Kansas City, where he was soon arrested for possession of marijuana. Since this was a violation of his parole, he was returned to prison. He was released once again in August 1987, after which he returned to St. Louis, found work at a car wash, and entered a night school for secondary education.

== Exposure ==
At the end of July 1988, Little was among the suspects considered in the murders of 28-year-old Imogen Jackson and the 50-year-old Catholic nun Patricia Ann Kelly, who lived in the same apartment building where Little had been living with his wife since 1987. Kelly was raped and strangled on September 27, 1987, in the office of Missouri EnergyCare Inc., a crisis center for the elderly. During the investigation, it turned out that Little was familiar with the victim and appeared at the office shortly before the murder, with circumstantial evidence being that there was no signs of forced entry in the office. Jackson was raped and killed on March 10, 1988, in the apartment building. On August 4, Jerry Little was detained for interrogation. By then, he was also considered a possible suspect for the murder of 60-year-old Rose Jackson, who was strangled on December 19, 1985. Little knew her because Rose was a follower of the Baptist Church, and in the early 1980s, served as an assistant prison chaplain at the institution where he was serving his sentence. Shortly before her murder, Jerry was spotted entering her apartment, but since there was no conclusive evidence found at the crime scene, he was cleared of suspicion. During his interrogation, Little unexpectedly confessed to the murders of the three women, as well as the murder of 48-year-old Doris Orly Hayes, whom he met via night school classes and eventually killed on April 10, 1988. His entire testimony was recorded on video, after which, he was charged.

== Trial ==
The trial began in September 1990. In order to avoid the death penalty, Little and his defense team filed a motion to jointly examine all charges in a single trial, which was upheld. The only evidence that ensured Little's guilt was his own testimony, and during the trial, his lawyers stated that their client had given false testimony under pressure and that he was insane. They requested a forensic examination, but Little refused to pretend being mentally ill during the trial and pleaded guilty, on the basis of which his lawyers' request was rejected. Little's wife, a number of his relatives and acquaintances testified in court as witnesses for the defense. However, in October 1990, Jerry Little was found guilty by jury verdict of the four murders involving rape, and received nine sentences of life imprisonment.

== Later events ==
In 1993, Little appealed for the annulment of the sentence and the appointment of a new trial, which was rejected. Due to the increase in recidivism among paroled offenders, the state of Missouri passed a law in 1994, on the basis of which criminals sentenced to long terms of imprisonment must serve 85% of the total sentence before being eligible for parole. Little died in 1994 at Central Utah Correctional Facility, Centerfield, Utah.
