= Bob Fesh =

American politician

Member of the New Hampshire House of Representatives from the Rockingham 6 district
- In office 1987–2018

Personal details
- Born: June 7, 1937 Danbury, Connecticut, U.S.
- Died: December 30, 2022 (aged 85) Manchester, New Hampshire, U.S.
- Party: Republican
- Education: Danbury State College
- Occupation: restaurateur

Robert Fesh (June 7, 1937 – December 20, 2022) was an American politician in the state of New Hampshire. He is a former member of the New Hampshire House of Representatives, sitting as a Republican from the Rockingham 6 district, having been first elected in 1987.
