= New Hampshire Charitable Foundation =

The New Hampshire Charitable Foundation was established in 1962 as a community foundation and tax-exempt 501(c)(3) public charity. It is one of the United States' largest community foundations and was formed to build social capital by making grants that advance charitable activities. Its extended purpose is to further identify current and emerging social issues, track trends and needs in the area of philanthropy and stimulate economic and social growth in the regions of New Hampshire. Funds are managed professionally and used to support local nonprofit organizations across the state that support its mission "to improve the quality of life in New Hampshire". The NHCF current president is Richard Ober.

== Notable donors ==
- Dan and Blythe Brown
