= James C. Summers =

James Calvin Summers
- Born: February 14, 1838; Elk River, 6 miles upriver from Charleston, West Virginia
- Died: May 9, 1927 (aged 89); Elkview, West Virginia
- Burial place: Donel C. Kinnard Memorial State Veterans Cemetery, Dunbar, West Virginia
- Military career
- Allegiance: United States (Union)
- Branch: Army
- Service years: 1861-1864
- Rank: Private
- Units: Company H, 4th West Virginia Infantry
- Conflicts: Vicksburg, Mississippi
- Awards: Medal of Honor

James Calvin Summers (14 February 1838 – 9 May 1927) was a private in the United States Army who was awarded the Presidential Medal of Honor for gallantry during the American Civil War. Summers was awarded the medal on 25 February 1895 for actions performed at the Siege of Vicksburg in Mississippi on 22 May 1863.

== Personal life ==
Summers was born on the Elk River approximately 6 miles upriver from Charleston, West Virginia. He married Laverna C. Stump and fathered 5 children. After the war, he worked as a farmer and a wagon driver. He died on 9 May 1927 in Elkview, West Virginia and was buried in Summers Cemetery in Elkview. He was reinterred in the Donel C. Kinnard Memorial State Veterans Cemetery in Dunbar, West Virginia on 31 October 2019.

== Military service ==
Summers enlisted in the Army on 18 August 1861 at Point Pleasant, West Virginia. He was assigned to Company H of the 4th West Virginia Infantry. On 22 May 1863, at the Siege of Vicksburg, he volunteered to join a storming party of 150 men whose mission it was to build a temporary bridge over a Confederate moat east of Vicksburg, Mississippi in anticipation of a Union offensive later that day. Approximately 85 percent of the men were killed or wounded during the charge.

Summers' Medal of Honor citation reads:

The President of the United States of America, in the name of Congress, takes pleasure in presenting the Medal of Honor to Private James Calvin Summers, United States Army, for gallantry in charge of the volunteer storming party on 22 May 1863, while serving with Company H, 4th West Virginia Infantry, in action at Vicksburg, Mississippi.

— D. S. Lamont, Secretary of War

Summers was mustered out of the Army on 26 August 1864.
