= Patricia Krueger =

Canadian classical pianist, organist and percussionist

Patricia Krueger (born 1946) is a Canadian classical pianist, organist and percussionist. In 2016 she became a member of the Toronto Symphony Orchestra (TSO).

== Early life ==
Krueger was born Patricia Perrin in Toronto. She attended the University of Toronto and played in the National Youth Orchestra.

== Career ==
Krueger worked as a high school music teacher. She began performing occasionally on percussion and piano with the Toronto Symphony Orchestra (TSO), and later became their house pianist; she was a member of the group for 40 years.

Krueger performed with the Nagano Winter Orchestra at the 1998 Olympics in Japan. She later formed her own orchestra, which performed at the Chiang Kai-Shek Memorial Hall in Taipei.

Krueger performed the piece "Victor's Piano Solo" in the 2005 film Corpse Bride.

In 2011 she toured with the TSO in the United States.
