= John Mullen (politician) =

American politician

Member of the New Hampshire House of Representatives from the 1st Strafford district
- In office December 5, 2012 – December 5, 2018 Serving with Robbie L. Parsons (2012–2015), Robert V. Graham, Jr (2015–2018)
- Preceded by: Multi-member district
- Succeeded by: Peter T. Hayward; Abigail Rooney

Personal details
- Party: Republican

John A. Mullen, Jr is an American politician. He served as a Republican member for the Strafford 1st district of the New Hampshire House of Representatives. He was first elected in 2012. He left office in 2018.
