= Bill Ohm =

American politician

Member of the New Hampshire House of Representatives from the Hillsborough 10th district
- Incumbent
- Assumed office December 2024
- Preceded by: Michael O'Brien
- Succeeded by: Samantha O'Loughlin (elect)

Member of the New Hampshire House of Representatives from the Hillsborough 36th district
- In office 2010–2018

Personal details
- Party: Republican
- Education: Massachusetts Institute of Technology (BA); Harvard Business School (MBA)

William Ohm is an American politician. A member of the Republican Party, he has served in the New Hampshire House of Representatives since 2024, and he previously served from 2010 to 2018.
