= John J. Mullen (American football) =

American football coach

Coaching career (HC unless noted)
- 1899: Fordham

Head coaching record
- Overall: 3–4

John J. Mullen was an American college football coach. He served as the head football coach at Fordham University for one season in 1899. He compiled a record of 3–4.

== Head coaching record ==
Year	Team	Overall	Conference	Standing	Bowl/playoffs
Fordham (Independent) (1899)
1899	Fordham	3–4			
Fordham:		3–4			
Total:		3–4			
