= James Summers (American politician) =

American politician

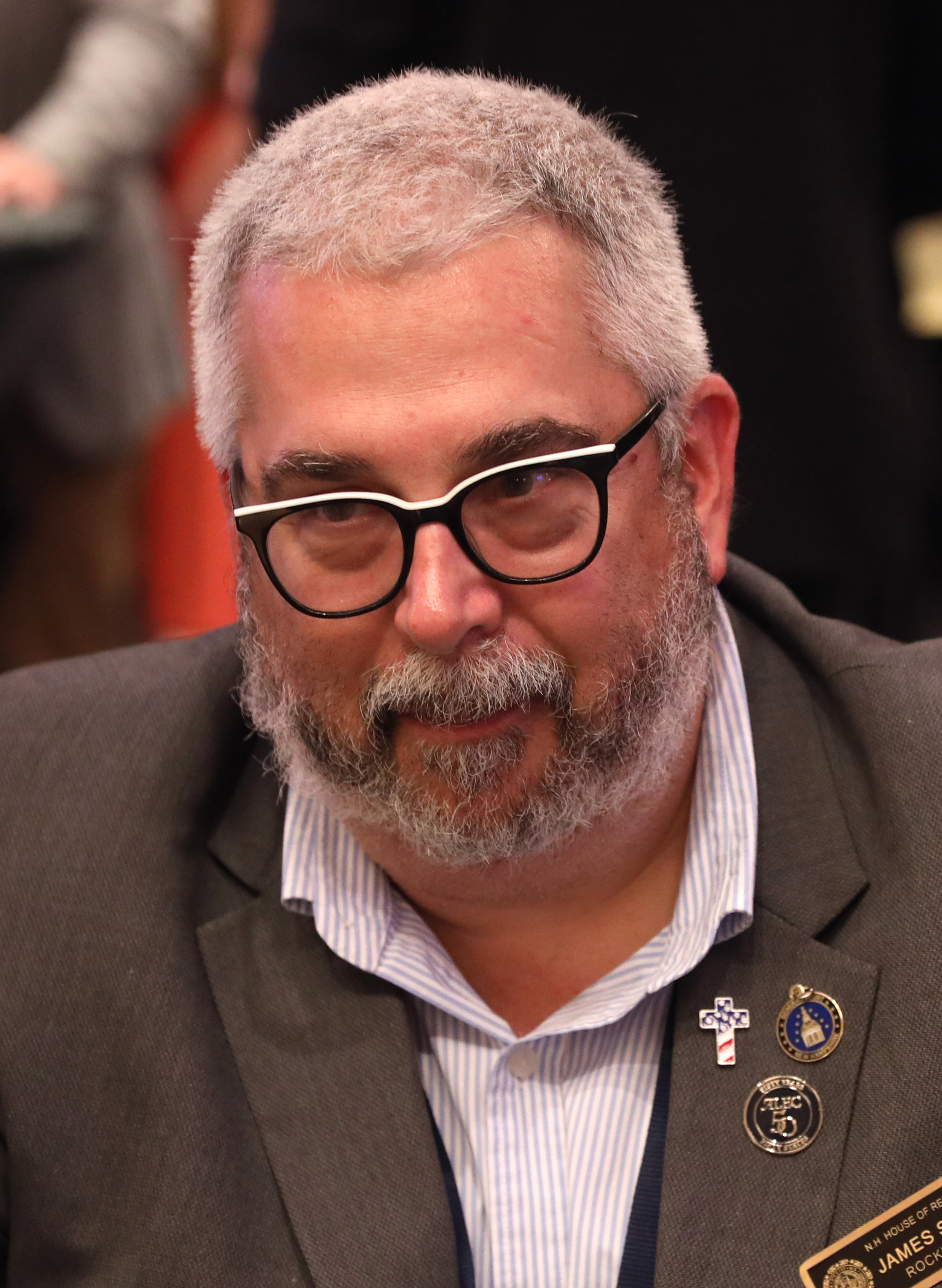

Member of the New Hampshire House of Representatives from the Rockingham 20th district
- Incumbent
- Assumed office December 7, 2022

Personal details
- Party: Republican

James Summers (Dr. James (Jim) Summers) is an American politician, business owner, professor, and Navy veteran. He served 2010-2012 for the Hillsborough 26th district and currently serves as a Republican member for the Rockingham 20th district of the New Hampshire House of Representatives.

After high school, Summers joined the United States Navy, where he served from 1990 to 1995. He graduated from Southern New Hampshire University, Penn State University, and Liberty University with his Doctorate in Business Administration and Juris Master law degree in American Legal Studies.
