= Matt Katz =

American journalist

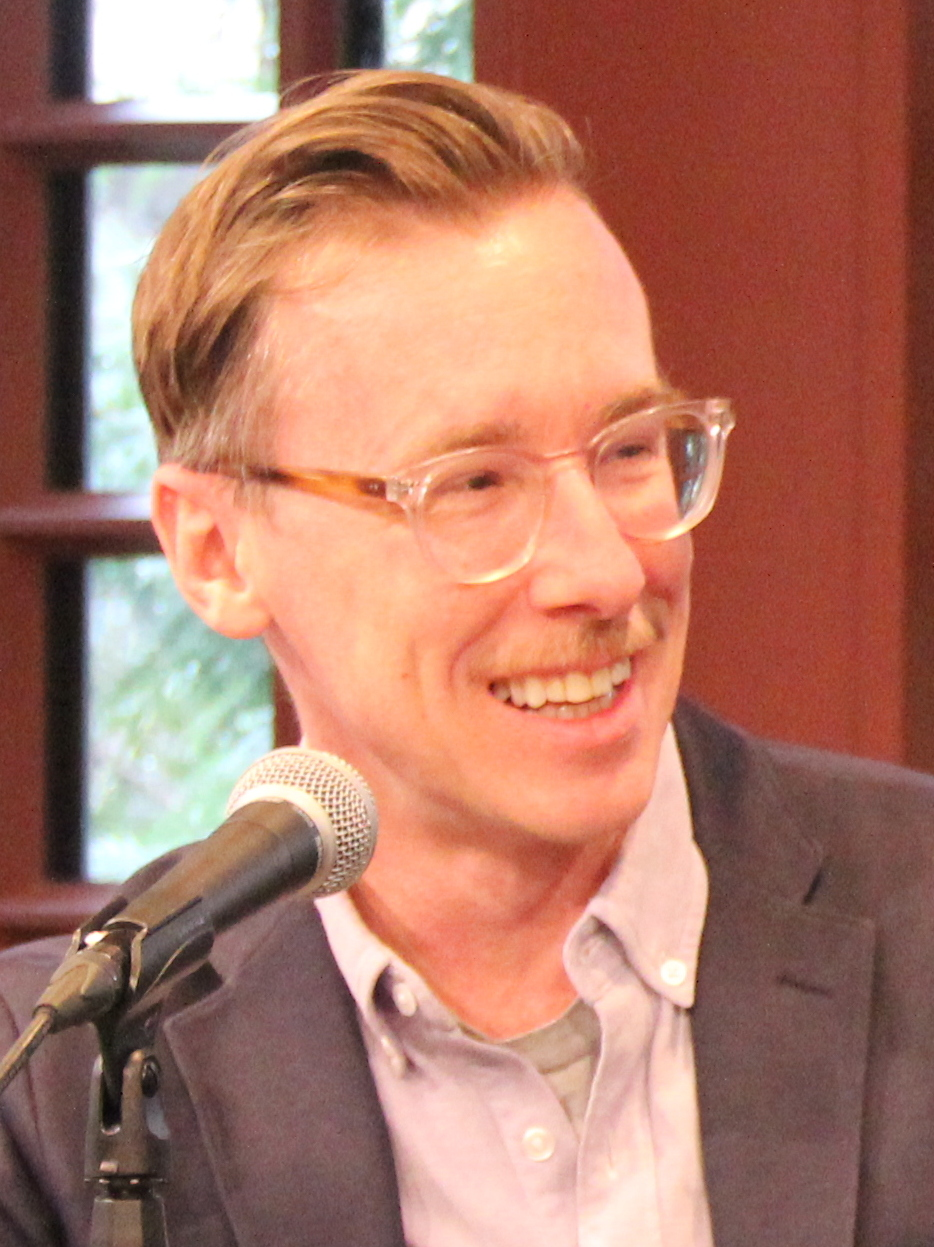
- Katz in 2025
- Born: July 4, 1978 (age 48)
- Occupation: Journalist

Matt Katz (born July 4, 1978) is an American journalist.

== Career and works ==
Katz currently works for University of Pennsylvania and City Cast podcasting network. He was previously a reporter at WNYC and New Jersey Public Radio, and has written for Gothamist, Politico, The New York Times, The Washington Post, The New Republic, The Philadelphia Inquirer, the Courier-Post and the Daily Record.

He won the Livingston Award for International Reporting for a series on reconstruction efforts in Afghanistan.

In 2022, Katz won the October Sidney Award for obtaining and publishing never-before-seen images of the squalid and lethal conditions at Rikers Island. The story was published on WNYC and its sister digital outlet, Gothamist.

Prior to becoming a political journalist, Katz was known as South Jersey's Carrie Bradshaw when he wrote a dating column.

He is Jewish and asserts that he suffered anti-semitic harassment as a result of reporting critically on U.S. presidential candidate Donald Trump.

In 2024, Matt Katz wrote and hosted an eight-episode podcast series, Inconceivable Truth, about his search for his biological father and his investigation into the unusual way in which he was conceived in 1970s Manhattan. The Irish Times called Katz a "crackling storyteller". Vogue named it one of the "best podcasts of 2024 so far".

=== Covering Chris Christie ===
Katz is known for his coverage of New Jersey Governor Chris Christie. He ran The Christie Tracker for New Jersey Public Radio. and he was also a member of the WNYC team that won a 2015 Peabody Award for its "Chris Christie, White House Ambitions and the Abuse of Power."

Katz is the author of American Governor: Chris Christie's Bridge to Redemption, a political profile of Chris Christie published on January 19, 2016, by Simon & Schuster.

== Background and education ==
Katz is the son of Roberta and Richard Katz of Roslyn, New York. He married Deborah Anne Hurwitz in 2008.

Katz has an undergraduate degree in Political Communication from George Washington University. He is member of Kappa Sigma fraternity.
