= John A. Mullen =

American judge

John A. Mullen (died 1972) was an American judge who served as a justice on the New York Supreme Court.
