= Michael Pedersen (politician) =

American politician

Member of the New Hampshire House of Representatives from the Hillsborough 32nd district
- Incumbent
- Assumed office December 5, 2018

Personal details
- Party: Democratic
- Education: Wentworth Institute of Technology

Michael Pedersen is a New Hampshire politician.

== Education ==
Pedersen earned a B.S in electronic engineering technology from the Wentworth Institute of Technology.

== Career ==
On November 6, 2018, Pedersen was elected to the New Hampshire House of Representatives where he represents the Hillsborough 32 district. Pedersen assumed office on December 5, 2018. Pedersen is a Democrat. Pedersen endorsed Amy Klobuchar in the 2020 Democratic Party presidential primaries.

== Personal life ==
Pedersen resides in Nashua, New Hampshire. Pedersen is widowed and has three children.
