= Barry Palmer (politician) =

American politician (1939–2023)

Member of the New Hampshire House of Representatives from the Hillsborough 26th district
- In office 2010–2012

Member of the New Hampshire House of Representatives from the Hillsborough 32nd district
- In office 2014–2016

Personal details
- Born: December 19, 1939
- Died: September 21, 2023 (aged 83)
- Party: Republican
- Education: Notre Dame College

Barry Palmer (December 19, 1939 – September 21, 2023) was an American politician. He served as a Republican member for the Hillsborough 26th and 32nd district of the New Hampshire House of Representatives.

== Life and career ==
Barry Palmer attended Notre Dame College.

Palmer served in the New Hampshire House of Representatives from 2010 to 2012 and again from 2014 to 2016.

Barry Palmer died of cancer on September 21, 2023, at the age of 83.
