= List of elections in 1918 =

The following elections occurred in the year 1918. Many of these were disrupted by the 1918 Influenza Pandemic, and the First World War.

== Europe ==
- 1918 Czechoslovak presidential election
- 1918 Danish Folketing election
- 1918 Danish Landsting election
- 1918 Dutch general election
- 1918 Faroese general election
- 1918 Icelandic sovereignty referendum
- 1918 Liechtenstein general election
- 1918 Liechtenstein local elections
- 1918 Luxembourg Constitutional Assembly election
- 1918 Monegasque general election
- 1918 Norwegian parliamentary election
- 1918 Portuguese general election
- 1918 Portuguese presidential election
- 1918 Romanian general election
- 1918 Romanian National Assembly election
- 1918 San Marino general election
- 1918 Spanish general election
- 1918 Ukrainian Constituent Assembly election

=== United Kingdom ===
- 1918 Banbury by-election
- 1918 Clapham by-election
- 1918 Elgin Burghs by-election
- 1918 Finsbury East by-election
- 1918 United Kingdom general election
  - England: 1918 United Kingdom general election in England
  - Ireland: 1918 United Kingdom general election in Ireland
  - Scotland: 1918 United Kingdom general election in Scotland
  - Wales: 1918 United Kingdom general election in Wales
  - List of MPs elected in the 1918 United Kingdom general election
- 1918 Manchester North East by-election
- 1918 Newcastle-upon-Tyne by-election
- January 1918 Prestwich by-election
- October 1918 Prestwich by-election
- 1918 South Armagh by-election
- 1918 South Shields by-election
- 1918 St George's, Hanover Square by-election
- 1918 Tullamore by-election
- 1918 Wansbeck by-election
- 1918 Waterford by-election
- 1918 Wilton by-election

== Americas ==
- 1918 Argentine legislative election
- 1918 Bolivian legislative election
- 1918 Brazilian general election
- 1918 Chilean parliamentary election
- 1918 Colombian presidential election
- 1918 Nicaraguan parliamentary election

=== Canada ===
- 1918 Edmonton municipal election
- 1918 Toronto municipal election

=== United States ===
- 1918 New York state election
- 1918 United States elections

==== United States lieutenant gubernatorial ====
- 1918 California lieutenant gubernatorial election
- 1918 Connecticut lieutenant gubernatorial election
- 1918 Minnesota lieutenant gubernatorial election
- 1918 Nebraska lieutenant gubernatorial election
- 1918 Texas lieutenant gubernatorial election
- 1918 Wisconsin lieutenant gubernatorial election

==== United States gubernatorial ====
- 1918 Alabama gubernatorial election
- 1918 Arkansas gubernatorial election
- 1918 California gubernatorial election
- 1918 Colorado gubernatorial election
- 1918 Connecticut gubernatorial election
- 1918 Georgia gubernatorial election
- 1918 Idaho gubernatorial election
- 1918 Iowa gubernatorial election
- 1918 Kansas gubernatorial election
- 1918 Maine gubernatorial election
- 1918 Massachusetts gubernatorial election
- 1918 Michigan gubernatorial election
- 1918 Minnesota gubernatorial election
- 1918 Nebraska gubernatorial election
- 1918 Nevada gubernatorial election
- 1918 New Hampshire gubernatorial election
- 1918 New Mexico gubernatorial election
- 1918 New York gubernatorial election
- 1918 North Dakota gubernatorial election
- 1918 Ohio gubernatorial election
- 1918 Oklahoma gubernatorial election
- 1918 Oregon gubernatorial election
- 1918 Pennsylvania gubernatorial election
- 1918 Rhode Island gubernatorial election
- 1918 South Carolina gubernatorial election
- 1918 South Dakota gubernatorial election
- 1918 Tennessee gubernatorial election
- 1918 Texas gubernatorial election
- 1918 United States gubernatorial elections
- 1918 Vermont gubernatorial election
- 1918 Wisconsin gubernatorial election
- 1918 Wyoming gubernatorial election

==== United States House of Representatives ====
- 1918 United States House of Representatives elections
- 1918 United States House of Representatives election in Arizona
- 1918 United States House of Representatives elections in California
- 1918 United States House of Representatives elections in Maryland
- 1918 United States House of Representatives elections in South Carolina

==== United States Senate ====
- 1918 United States Senate elections
- 1918 United States Senate election in Colorado
- 1918 United States Senate election in Idaho
- 1918 United States Senate special election in Idaho
- 1918 United States Senate election in Illinois
- 1918 United States Senate election in Iowa
- 1918 United States Senate election in Kansas
- 1918 United States Senate election in Kentucky
- 1918 United States Senate election in Maine
- 1918 United States Senate election in Massachusetts
- 1918 United States Senate election in Michigan
- 1918 United States Senate election in Minnesota
- 1918 United States Senate election in Mississippi
- 1918 United States Senate special election in Missouri
- 1918 United States Senate election in Montana
- 1918 United States Senate election in Nebraska
- 1918 United States Senate election in New Hampshire
- 1918 United States Senate special election in New Hampshire
- 1918 United States Senate election in New Jersey
- 1918 United States Senate election in Oklahoma
- 1918 United States Senate election in South Carolina
- 1918 United States Senate special election in South Carolina
- 1918 United States Senate election in South Dakota
- 1918 United States Senate election in Tennessee
- 1918 United States Senate election in Texas
- 1918 United States Senate special election in Wisconsin
- 1918 United States Senate election in Wyoming

=== Panama ===
- 1918 Panamanian parliamentary election
- 1918 Panamanian presidential election

== Oceania ==
=== Australia ===
- 1918 South Australian state election
- 1918 Cobar state by-election
- 1918 Corangamite by-election
- 1918 Flinders by-election
- 1918 Monaro state by-election
- 1918 Swan by-election
- 1918 Queensland state election
- 1918 Upper Hunter state by-election

=== New Zealand ===
- 1918 Grey by-election
- 1918 Palmerston by-election
- 1918 Taranaki by-election
- 1918 Wellington Central by-election
- 1918 Wellington North by-election
- 1918 Wellington South by-election

== See also ==
- Category:1918 elections
