= 1928 United States presidential election in California =

- November 6, 1928
- Turnout: 79.78% (of registered voters) ▲6.44 pp 56.98% (of eligible voters) ▲8.45 pp

Nominee	Herbert Hoover	Al Smith
Party	Republican	Democratic
Alliance	Prohibition
Home state	California	New York
Running mate	Charles Curtis	Joseph T. Robinson
Electoral vote	13	0
Popular vote	1,162,323	614,365
Percentage	64.69%	34.19%
County results
Hoover
40–50%
50–60%
60–70%
70–80%
90–100%
Smith
40–50%
50–60%
President before election
Calvin Coolidge
Republican
Elected President
Herbert Hoover
Republican

The 1928 United States presidential election in California took place on November 6, 1928, as part of the 1928 United States presidential election. State voters chose 13 representatives, or electors, to the Electoral College, who voted for president and vice president.

California voted for the Republican nominee, former Commerce Secretary Herbert Hoover, in a landslide over the Democratic nominee, New York Governor Al Smith. This was also the first election in California where the winning candidate received over 1 million votes. This also remains the last time that a Republican got more than 60% of the vote in California.

This was the last time until 1952 that a Republican presidential nominee carried California. After this election, no Republican candidate would win Plumas County again until 1980, and no Republican would carry Fresno County, Kings County, Lassen County, Madera County, and Solano County again until 1972.

Smith won in a few unionized mining/logging counties in the Sierras, and the substantially Catholic (Irish and Italian) city of San Francisco. Hoover’s largest victories in California were scored in Southern California (largely settled from the white, Protestant Lower Midwest).

== Results ==
General Election Results
Party	Pledged to	Elector	Votes
Republican Party & Prohibition Party	Herbert Hoover	Harriet W. Works	1,162,323
Republican Party & Prohibition Party	Herbert Hoover	Rolfe L. Thompson	1,160,780
Republican Party & Prohibition Party	Herbert Hoover	Ben R. Meyer	1,160,770
Republican Party & Prohibition Party	Herbert Hoover	John A. O'Connell	1,160,539
Republican Party & Prohibition Party	Herbert Hoover	Harry K. Wolff	1,160,536
Republican Party & Prohibition Party	Herbert Hoover	Aurelia H. Reinhardt	1,160,490
Republican Party & Prohibition Party	Herbert Hoover	Marshall DeMotte	1,160,488
Republican Party & Prohibition Party	Herbert Hoover	James F. Collins	1,160,443
Republican Party & Prohibition Party	Herbert Hoover	C. P. Rendon	1,160,407
Republican Party & Prohibition Party	Herbert Hoover	A. W. McPherson	1,160,332
Republican Party & Prohibition Party	Herbert Hoover	L. L. Dennett	1,160,308
Republican Party & Prohibition Party	Herbert Hoover	Fred H. Schauer	1,160,296
Republican Party & Prohibition Party	Herbert Hoover	R. Y. Williams	1,160,126
Democratic Party	Al Smith	James D. Phelan	614,365
Democratic Party	Al Smith	Clara Hellman Heller	611,430
Democratic Party	Al Smith	John H. Young	611,348
Democratic Party	Al Smith	R. M. Fitzgerald	611,321
Democratic Party	Al Smith	Ross W. Pool	611,316
Democratic Party	Al Smith	Justus S. Wardell	611,279
Democratic Party	Al Smith	A. L. Conrad	611,236
Democratic Party	Al Smith	Estill Stephens Bartell	611,220
Democratic Party	Al Smith	Milton K. Young	611,156
Democratic Party	Al Smith	Julia Babcock	611,143
Democratic Party	Al Smith	C. M. Brown Jr.	611,083
Democratic Party	Al Smith	Phil Dodson	611,004
Democratic Party	Al Smith	Curtis Hillyer	610,680
Socialist Party	Norman Thomas	Upton Sinclair	19,595
Socialist Party	Norman Thomas	Addie M. Benedict	19,240
Socialist Party	Norman Thomas	E. Backus	19,170
Socialist Party	Norman Thomas	Mary M. Morgan	19,168
Socialist Party	Norman Thomas	Agnes H. Downing	19,157
Socialist Party	Norman Thomas	N. A. Richardson	19,154
Socialist Party	Norman Thomas	W. H. Eastman	19,153
Socialist Party	Norman Thomas	Allen K. Clifford	19,152
Socialist Party	Norman Thomas	Philip Bernstein	19,150
Socialist Party	Norman Thomas	Walter E. Walker	19,144
Socialist Party	Norman Thomas	Julius Levitt	19,135
Socialist Party	Norman Thomas	W. T. Tipton	19,091
Socialist Party	Norman Thomas	F. L. Neustein	19,082
Write-in		William Z. Foster (Note: Since California voted for electors directly, these votes were for Foster specifically and not the Communist ticket, which was not on the ballot in the state)	112
Write-in		Benjamin Gitlow	104
Write-in		H. Morgan	6
Write-in		Scattering	151
Votes cast (Note: Based on totals for highest elector on each ticket)			1,796,656

=== Results by county ===
County	Herbert Hoover Republican/Prohibition		Al Smith Democratic		Norman Thomas Socialist		William Z. Foster Communist		Scattering Write-in		Margin		Total votes cast (Note: Based on the highest elector on each ticket)
County	#	%	#	%	#	%	#	%	#	%	#	%	Total votes cast
Alameda	118,539	65.42%	60,875	33.60%	1,717	0.95%	0	0.00%	63	0.03%	57,664	31.82%	181,194
Alpine	49	94.23%	3	5.77%	0	0.00%	0	0.00%	0	0.00%	46	88.46%	52
Amador	990	44.12%	1,246	55.53%	8	0.36%	0	0.00%	0	0.00%	-256	-11.41%	2,244
Butte	6,306	60.45%	3,946	37.83%	180	1.73%	0	0.00%	0	0.00%	2,360	22.62%	10,432
Calaveras	1,262	53.79%	1,066	45.44%	18	0.77%	0	0.00%	0	0.00%	196	8.35%	2,346
Colusa	1,752	56.30%	1,338	42.99%	22	0.71%	0	0.00%	0	0.00%	414	13.30%	3,112
Contra Costa	13,495	60.38%	8,573	38.36%	281	1.26%	0	0.00%	0	0.00%	4,922	22.02%	22,349
Del Norte	771	55.87%	599	43.41%	10	0.72%	0	0.00%	0	0.00%	172	12.46%	1,380
El Dorado	1,228	44.25%	1,516	54.63%	31	1.12%	0	0.00%	0	0.00%	-288	-10.38%	2,775
Fresno	20,687	54.30%	16,884	44.32%	527	1.38%	0	0.00%	0	0.00%	3,803	9.98%	38,098
Glenn	2,466	65.03%	1,297	34.20%	29	0.76%	0	0.00%	0	0.00%	1,169	30.83%	3,792
Humboldt	9,162	69.75%	3,726	28.37%	247	1.88%	0	0.00%	0	0.00%	5,436	41.39%	13,135
Imperial	5,417	67.61%	2,486	31.03%	109	1.36%	0	0.00%	0	0.00%	2,931	36.58%	8,012
Inyo	1,206	57.37%	861	40.96%	35	1.67%	0	0.00%	0	0.00%	345	16.41%	2,102
Kern	14,692	62.67%	8,541	36.43%	212	0.90%	0	0.00%	0	0.00%	6,151	26.24%	23,445
Kings	2,947	51.51%	2,701	47.21%	73	1.28%	0	0.00%	0	0.00%	246	4.30%	5,721
Lake	1,820	65.37%	926	33.26%	38	1.36%	0	0.00%	0	0.00%	894	32.11%	2,784
Lassen	2,111	56.73%	1,597	42.92%	13	0.35%	0	0.00%	0	0.00%	514	13.81%	3,721
Los Angeles	513,526	70.22%	209,945	28.71%	7,589	1.04%	78	0.01%	163	0.02%	303,581	41.51%	731,301
Madera	2,354	54.88%	1,896	44.21%	37	0.86%	1	0.02%	1	0.02%	458	10.68%	4,289
Marin	7,862	57.44%	5,686	41.54%	140	1.02%	0	0.00%	0	0.00%	2,176	15.90%	13,688
Mariposa	656	55.03%	517	43.37%	19	1.59%	0	0.00%	0	0.00%	139	11.66%	1,192
Mendocino	4,810	63.39%	2,628	34.63%	150	1.98%	0	0.00%	0	0.00%	2,182	28.76%	7,588
Merced	4,644	60.17%	2,970	38.48%	104	1.35%	0	0.00%	0	0.00%	1,674	21.69%	7,718
Modoc	942	56.75%	711	42.83%	7	0.42%	0	0.00%	0	0.00%	231	13.92%	1,660
Mono	220	61.80%	127	35.67%	9	2.53%	0	0.00%	0	0.00%	93	26.12%	356
Monterey	7,228	63.12%	4,138	36.13%	86	0.75%	0	0.00%	0	0.00%	3,090	26.98%	11,452
Napa	4,699	57.48%	3,422	41.86%	54	0.66%	0	0.00%	0	0.00%	1,277	15.62%	8,175
Nevada	2,173	52.00%	1,959	46.88%	47	1.12%	0	0.00%	0	0.00%	214	5.12%	4,179
Orange	30,572	79.35%	7,611	19.75%	344	0.89%	0	0.00%	0	0.00%	22,961	59.60%	38,527
Placer	3,669	49.25%	3,685	49.46%	96	1.29%	0	0.00%	0	0.00%	-16	-0.21%	7,450
Plumas	947	45.64%	1,079	52.00%	49	2.36%	0	0.00%	0	0.00%	-132	-6.36%	2,075
Riverside	17,600	77.94%	4,769	21.12%	212	0.94%	0	0.00%	0	0.00%	12,831	56.82%	22,581
Sacramento	20,762	50.83%	19,684	48.19%	403	0.99%	0	0.00%	0	0.00%	1,078	2.64%	40,849
San Benito	1,971	58.87%	1,366	40.80%	11	0.33%	0	0.00%	0	0.00%	605	18.07%	3,348
San Bernardino	29,229	74.73%	9,436	24.13%	447	1.14%	0	0.00%	0	0.00%	19,793	50.61%	39,112
San Diego	47,769	67.14%	22,749	31.97%	633	0.89%	0	0.00%	0	0.00%	25,020	35.16%	71,151
San Francisco	95,987	49.11%	96,632	49.44%	2,799	1.43%	24	0.01%	26	0.01%	-645	-0.33%	195,468
San Joaquin	16,695	61.10%	10,343	37.85%	288	1.05%	0	0.00%	0	0.00%	6,352	23.25%	27,326
San Luis Obispo	5,425	60.82%	3,336	37.40%	159	1.78%	0	0.00%	0	0.00%	2,089	23.42%	8,920
San Mateo	14,360	58.87%	9,755	39.99%	267	1.09%	5	0.02%	5	0.02%	4,605	18.88%	24,392
Santa Barbara	11,666	69.44%	4,954	29.49%	179	1.07%	0	0.00%	0	0.00%	6,712	23.25%	16,799
Santa Clara	31,710	63.81%	17,589	35.39%	388	0.78%	4	0.01%	3	0.01%	14,121	28.42%	49,694
Santa Cruz	8,275	68.53%	3,688	30.54%	112	0.93%	0	0.00%	0	0.00%	4,587	37.99%	12,075
Shasta	2,301	52.20%	2,025	45.94%	82	1.86%	0	0.00%	0	0.00%	276	6.26%	4,408
Sierra	457	51.52%	420	47.35%	10	1.13%	0	0.00%	0	0.00%	37	4.17%	887
Siskiyou	3,758	55.49%	2,916	43.06%	98	1.45%	0	0.00%	0	0.00%	842	12.43%	6,772
Solano	7,061	52.32%	6,278	46.51%	158	1.17%	0	0.00%	0	0.00%	783	5.80%	13,497
Sonoma	12,891	59.71%	8,506	39.40%	194	0.90%	0	0.00%	0	0.00%	4,385	20.31%	21,591
Stanislaus	10,753	67.13%	5,063	31.61%	203	1.27%	0	0.00%	0	0.00%	5,690	35.52%	16,019
Sutter	2,239	53.98%	1,875	45.20%	34	0.82%	0	0.00%	0	0.00%	364	8.78%	4,148
Tehama	3,393	65.58%	1,650	31.89%	131	2.53%	0	0.00%	0	0.00%	1,743	33.69%	5,174
Trinity	447	48.85%	433	47.32%	35	3.83%	0	0.00%	0	0.00%	14	1.53%	915
Tulare	12,057	63.76%	6,635	35.09%	218	1.15%	0	0.00%	0	0.00%	5,422	28.67%	18,910
Tuolumne	1,731	54.80%	1,360	43.05%	68	2.15%	0	0.00%	0	0.00%	371	11.74%	3,159
Ventura	9,017	70.17%	3,717	28.92%	117	0.91%	0	0.00%	0	0.00%	5,300	41.24%	12,851
Yolo	3,545	56.96%	2,641	42.43%	38	0.61%	0	0.00%	0	0.00%	904	14.52%	6,224
Yuba	2,022	50.02%	1,990	49.23%	30	0.74%	0	0.00%	0	0.00%	32	0.79%	4,042
Total	1,162,323	64.69%	614,365	34.19%	19,595	1.09%	112	0.01%	261	0.01%	547,958	30.50%	1,796,656

==== Counties that flipped from Socialist to Republican ====
- Butte
- Calaveras
- Lassen
- Nevada
- Sacramento
- Shasta
- Sierra
- Siskiyou
- Trinity
- Tuolumne

==== Counties that flipped from Socialist to Democratic ====
- Amador
- El Dorado
- Plumas
- Placer

==== Counties that flipped from Republican to Democratic ====
- San Francisco
