= 1922 California lieutenant gubernatorial election =

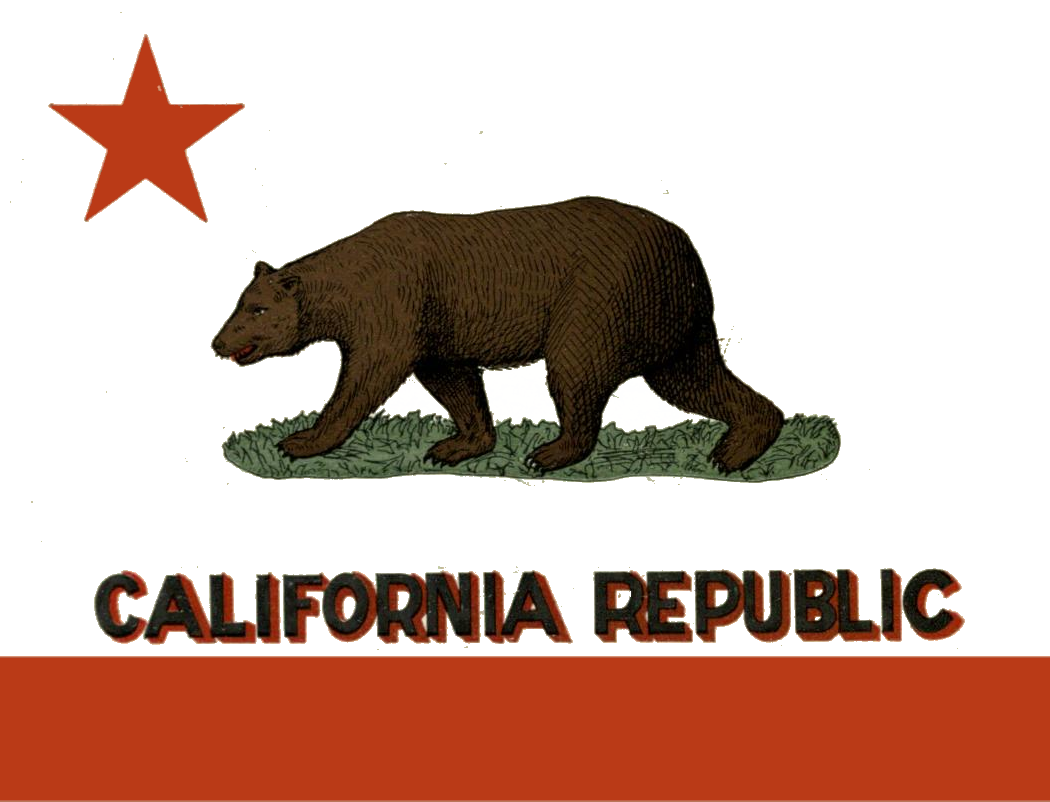
- November 7, 1922
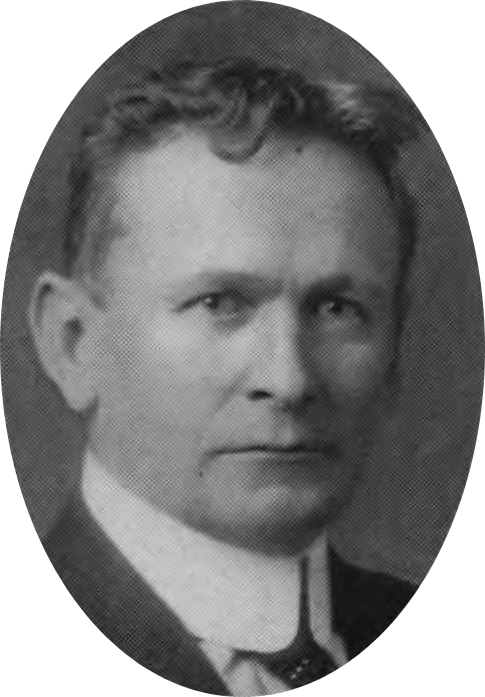

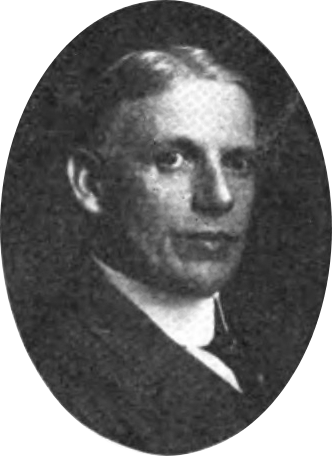

Nominee	C. C. Young	William B. Shearer	Isabel C. King
Party	Republican	Democratic	Socialist
Popular vote	597,349	232,366	58,088
Percentage	67.28%	26.17%	6.54%
- County results Young: 50–60% 60–70% 70–80% 80–90%
Lieutenant Governor before election
C. C. Young
Republican
Elected Lieutenant Governor
C. C. Young
Republican

The 1922 California lieutenant gubernatorial election was held on November 7, 1922. Incumbent Republican Lieutenant Governor C. C. Young defeated Democratic State Senator William B. Shearer with 67.28% of the vote.

== General election ==
=== Candidates ===
- C. C. Young, Republican
- William B. Shearer, Democratic
- Isabel C. King, Socialist

=== Results ===
1922 California lieutenant gubernatorial election
Party	Candidate	Votes	%	±%
Republican	C. C. Young (incumbent)	597,349	67.28%	
Democratic	William B. Shearer	232,366	26.17%	
Socialist	Isabel C. King	58,088	6.54%	
Majority		887,803		
Turnout				
Republican hold		Swing		
