= 1926 California gubernatorial election =

- November 2, 1926
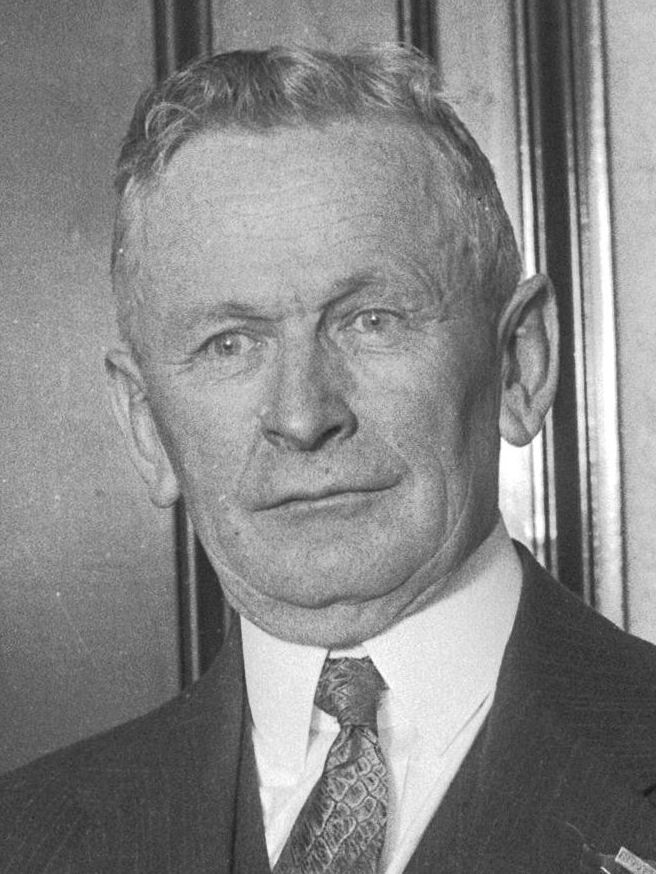

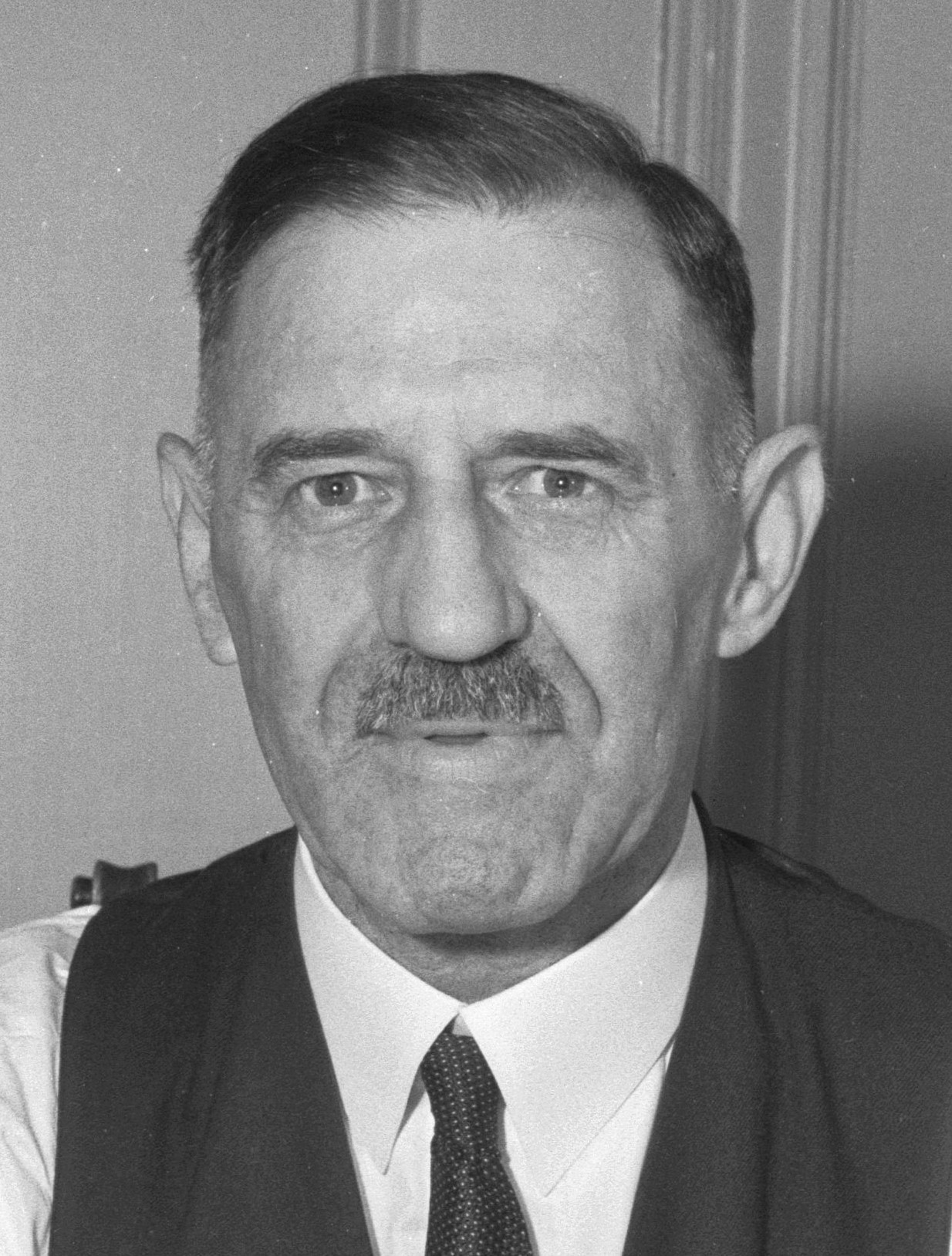
Nominee	C. C. Young	Justus S. Wardell
Party	Republican	Democratic
Popular vote	814,815	282,451
Percentage	71.22%	24.69%
- County results Young: 50–60% 60–70% 70–80% 80–90%
Governor before election
Friend Richardson
Republican
Elected Governor
C. C. Young
Republican

The 1926 California gubernatorial election was held on November 2, 1926. Republican lieutenant governor C. C. Young defeated Justus S. Wardell in a landslide.

In the Republican primary, incumbent governor Friend Richardson was challenged by C. C. Young and Rex B. Goodell. Young, a progressive ally of U.S. senator and former governor Hiram Johnson, narrowly defeated Richardson by just over 15,000 votes. Although Richardson won the Prohibition Party primary, he was unable to accept the nomination under the Hawson amendment because he had lost his own party's primary. This was the second of three consecutive elections in which the incumbent lost the Republican primary. In the Democratic primary, Justus S. Wardell narrowly defeated Carl A. Johnson.

In the general election, Young won a record landslide with over 71 percent of the vote and a majority of more than 630,000 votes over Wardell, the largest percentage of the vote and margin in California history. He was the first candidate in California history to sweep every county in the state in a gubernatorial election.

== Primary election results ==
Lieutenant Governor C. C. Young challenged incumbent governor Friend William Richardson for the Republican nomination. Young was aligned with former governor and sitting United States Senator Hiram Johnson and the latter's Progressive wing of the Republican party in California. Young narrowly defeated Richardson in the Republican primary. Richardson won the Prohibition Party primary but state law prevented him from running on the Prohibition ticket due to his losing his own party's primary.

Republican primary results
Party	Candidate	Votes	%
Republican	C. C. Young	327,596	42.71%
Republican	Friend William Richardson (incumbent)	312,324	40.72%
Republican	Rex B. Goodell	105,489	13.75%
Republican	R. F. McClellan	8,486	1.11%
Republican	W. D. Mitchell	7,858	1.02%
Republican	Mayo Thomas	5,269	0.69%
Total votes		767,022	100.00%

Democratic primary results
Party	Candidate	Votes	%
Democratic	Justus S. Wardell	67,875	52.94%
Democratic	Carl Alexander Johnson	60,329	47.06%
Total votes		128,204	100.00%

Socialist primary results
Party	Candidate	Votes	%
Socialist	Upton Sinclair	5,099	100.00%
Total votes		5,099	100.00%

Prohibition primary results
Party	Candidate	Votes	%
Prohibition	Friend William Richardson (write-in)	2,999	73.22%
Prohibition	C. C. Young (write-in)	1,097	26.78%
Total votes		4,096	100.00%

== General election results ==
1926 California gubernatorial election
Party	Candidate	Votes	%	±%
Republican	C. C. Young	814,815	71.22%	+11.53%
Democratic	Justus S. Wardell	282,451	24.69%	−11.29%
Socialist	Upton Sinclair	45,972	4.02%	−0.27%
	Scattering	874	0.08%	
Majority		532,364	46.53%	
Total votes		1,144,112	100.00%	
Republican hold		Swing	+22.83%	

=== Results by county ===
County	C. C. Young Republican		Justus S. Wardell Democratic		Upton Sinclair Socialist		Scattering Write-in		Margin		Total votes cast
County	#	%	#	%	#	%	#	%	#	%	Total votes cast
Alameda	85,412	69.26%	32,686	26.51%	5,221	4.23%	0	0.00%	52,726	42.76%	123,319
Alpine	52	85.25%	9	14.75%	0	0.00%	0	0.00%	43	70.49%	61
Amador	991	54.81%	771	42.64%	45	2.49%	1	0.06%	220	12.17%	1,808
Butte	7,129	68.02%	2,925	27.91%	426	4.06%	0	0.00%	4,204	40.11%	10,480
Calaveras	1,528	73.11%	471	22.54%	91	4.35%	0	0.00%	1,057	50.57%	2,090
Colusa	1,681	54.74%	1,336	43.50%	54	1.76%	0	0.00%	345	11.23%	3,071
Contra Costa	11,257	67.56%	4,668	28.02%	736	4.42%	0	0.00%	6,589	39.55%	16,661
Del Norte	941	74.33%	293	23.14%	32	2.53%	0	0.00%	648	51.18%	1,266
El Dorado	1,660	53.22%	1,355	43.44%	104	3.33%	0	0.00%	305	9.78%	3,119
Fresno	24,469	72.43%	8,181	24.22%	1,132	3.35%	0	0.00%	16,288	48.22%	33,782
Glenn	2,326	66.63%	1,057	30.28%	96	2.75%	12	0.34%	1,269	36.35%	3,491
Humboldt	9,566	72.09%	3,170	23.89%	533	4.02%	0	0.00%	6,396	48.20%	13,269
Imperial	6,303	82.51%	1,116	14.61%	220	2.88%	0	0.00%	5,187	67.90%	7,639
Inyo	1,651	71.60%	487	21.12%	168	7.29%	0	0.00%	1,164	50.48%	2,306
Kern	9,724	52.42%	8,026	43.26%	776	4.18%	25	0.13%	1,698	9.15%	18,551
Kings	3,456	64.26%	1,755	32.63%	162	3.01%	5	0.09%	1,701	31.63%	5,378
Lake	1,572	61.60%	864	33.86%	112	4.39%	4	0.16%	708	27.74%	2,552
Lassen	2,198	73.81%	687	23.07%	93	3.12%	0	0.00%	1,511	50.74%	2,978
Los Angeles	291,368	77.89%	64,281	17.18%	17,924	4.79%	483	0.13%	227,087	60.71%	374,056
Madera	2,876	69.49%	1,083	26.17%	180	4.35%	0	0.00%	1,793	43.32%	4,139
Marin	6,370	63.31%	3,369	33.48%	323	3.21%	0	0.00%	3,001	29.83%	10,062
Mariposa	587	61.66%	326	34.24%	39	4.10%	0	0.00%	261	27.42%	952
Mendocino	4,339	65.39%	2,065	31.12%	232	3.50%	0	0.00%	2,274	34.27%	6,636
Merced	4,952	69.60%	1,876	26.37%	287	4.03%	0	0.00%	3,076	43.23%	7,115
Modoc	1,022	64.56%	517	32.66%	44	2.78%	0	0.00%	505	31.90%	1,583
Mono	236	81.66%	38	13.15%	15	5.19%	0	0.00%	198	68.51%	289
Monterey	6,121	71.85%	2,140	25.12%	258	3.03%	0	0.00%	3,981	46.73%	8,519
Napa	4,105	54.40%	3,279	43.45%	156	2.07%	6	0.08%	826	10.95%	7,546
Nevada	2,515	67.08%	1,044	27.85%	190	5.07%	0	0.00%	1,471	39.24%	3,749
Orange	19,110	78.29%	4,466	18.30%	794	3.25%	40	0.16%	14,644	59.99%	24,410
Placer	4,263	71.42%	1,501	25.15%	198	3.32%	7	0.12%	2,762	46.27%	5,969
Plumas	1,297	75.10%	334	19.34%	96	5.56%	0	0.00%	963	55.76%	1,727
Riverside	10,306	79.61%	2,235	17.27%	404	3.12%	0	0.00%	8,071	62.35%	12,945
Sacramento	20,679	66.39%	9,675	31.06%	756	2.43%	37	0.12%	11,004	35.33%	31,147
San Benito	1,828	68.67%	780	29.30%	54	2.03%	0	0.00%	1,048	39.37%	2,662
San Bernardino	17,561	75.82%	4,666	20.15%	902	3.89%	32	0.14%	12,895	55.68%	23,161
San Diego	29,994	78.53%	6,441	16.86%	1,759	4.61%	0	0.00%	23,553	61.67%	38,194
San Francisco	73,012	58.27%	47,757	38.11%	4,532	3.62%	0	0.00%	25,255	20.16%	125,301
San Joaquin	16,586	70.22%	6,349	26.88%	670	2.84%	15	0.06%	10,237	43.34%	23,620
San Luis Obispo	5,432	67.37%	2,221	27.55%	410	5.08%	0	0.00%	3,211	39.82%	8,063
San Mateo	11,679	71.82%	3,964	24.38%	607	3.73%	12	0.07%	7,715	47.44%	16,262
Santa Barbara	6,762	71.85%	2,274	24.16%	344	3.66%	31	0.33%	4,488	47.69%	9,411
Santa Clara	25,837	77.45%	6,592	19.76%	905	2.71%	24	0.07%	19,245	57.69%	33,358
Santa Cruz	6,986	69.40%	2,658	26.40%	396	3.93%	27	0.27%	4,328	42.99%	10,067
Shasta	2,811	64.25%	1,373	31.38%	189	4.32%	2	0.05%	1,438	32.87%	4,375
Sierra	668	72.14%	217	23.43%	38	4.10%	3	0.32%	451	48.70%	926
Siskiyou	4,394	69.04%	1,708	26.84%	262	4.12%	0	0.00%	2,686	42.21%	6,364
Solano	7,144	64.44%	3,565	32.16%	377	3.40%	0	0.00%	3,579	32.28%	11,086
Sonoma	11,639	58.71%	7,577	38.22%	590	2.98%	18	0.09%	4,062	20.49%	19,824
Stanislaus	9,133	69.08%	3,489	26.39%	547	4.14%	52	0.39%	5,644	42.69%	13,221
Sutter	2,678	69.92%	1,067	27.86%	85	2.22%	0	0.00%	1,611	42.06%	3,830
Tehama	2,974	64.43%	1,406	30.46%	236	5.11%	0	0.00%	1,568	33.97%	4,616
Trinity	749	70.39%	253	23.78%	62	5.83%	0	0.00%	496	46.62%	1,064
Tulare	10,754	65.28%	5,101	30.96%	589	3.58%	30	0.18%	5,653	34.31%	16,474
Tuolumne	1,818	67.31%	732	27.10%	151	5.59%	0	0.00%	1,086	40.21%	2,701
Ventura	6,125	80.07%	1,336	17.46%	185	2.42%	4	0.05%	4,789	62.60%	7,650
Yolo	3,509	64.90%	1,797	33.23%	97	1.79%	4	0.07%	1,712	31.66%	5,407
Yuba	2,680	70.34%	1,042	27.35%	88	2.31%	0	0.00%	1,638	42.99%	3,810
Total	814,815	71.22%	282,451	24.69%	45,972	4.02%	874	0.08%	532,364	46.53%	1,144,112

==== Counties that flipped from Democratic to Republican ====
- El Dorado
- Mariposa
- San Francisco
- Solano
