= C. C. Young =

American politician

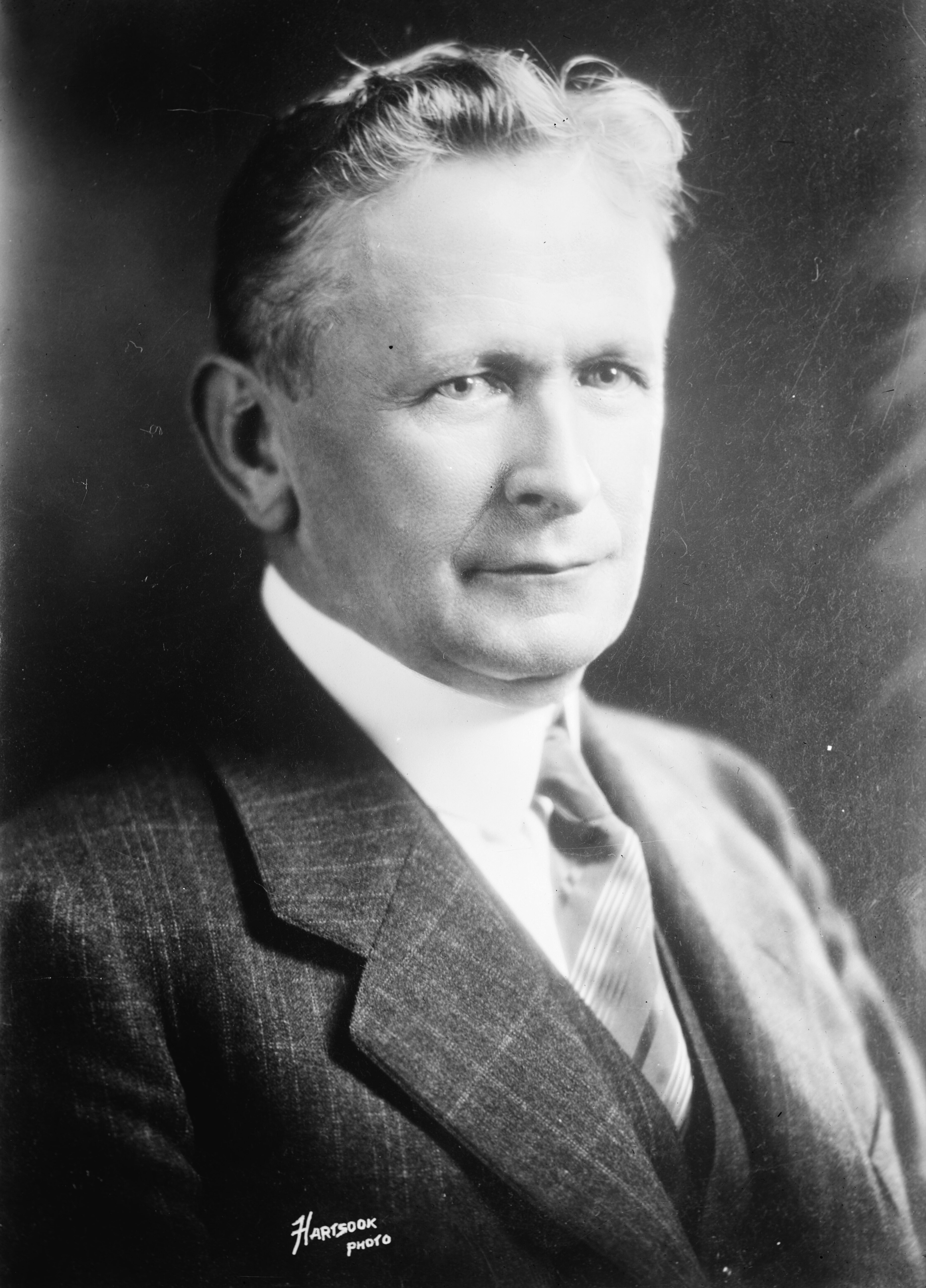
- Portrait by Fred Hartsook c. 1926

26th Governor of California
- In office January 4, 1927 – January 6, 1931
- Lieutenant: Buron Fitts; H. L. Carnahan
- Preceded by: Friend Richardson
- Succeeded by: James Rolph

28th Lieutenant Governor of California
- In office January 6, 1919 – January 4, 1927
- Governor: William Stephens; Friend Richardson
- Preceded by: William Stephens
- Succeeded by: Buron Fitts

39th Speaker of the California State Assembly
- In office January 6, 1913 – April 27, 1917
- Preceded by: Arthur Hathaway Hewitt
- Succeeded by: Henry W. Wright

Member of the California State Assembly
- In office January 4, 1909 – January 6, 1919
- Preceded by: John Morton Eshleman
- Succeeded by: Anna L. Saylor
- Constituency: 52nd district (1909–1913); 41st district (1913–1919)

Personal details
- Born: Clement Calhoun Young; April 28, 1869 Lisbon, New Hampshire, U.S.
- Died: December 24, 1947 (aged 78) Berkeley, California, U.S.
- Party: Republican (before 1914, after 1916); Progressive (1914–1916)
- Spouse: Lyla Jeannette Vincent
- Children: 2
- Profession: Teacher; Politician

Clement Calhoun Young (April 28, 1869 – December 24, 1947) was an American educator and politician who was affiliated with the original Progressive Party and later the Republican Party. He was elected to five consecutive terms in the California State Assembly, serving from 1909 to 1919, then as the 28th lieutenant governor of California, holding that office from 1919 to 1927. In the 1926 general election, he was elected in a landslide victory as the 26th governor of California and served from 1927 to 1931. Young is considered to have been one of the last governors from the Progressive movement.

== Biography ==
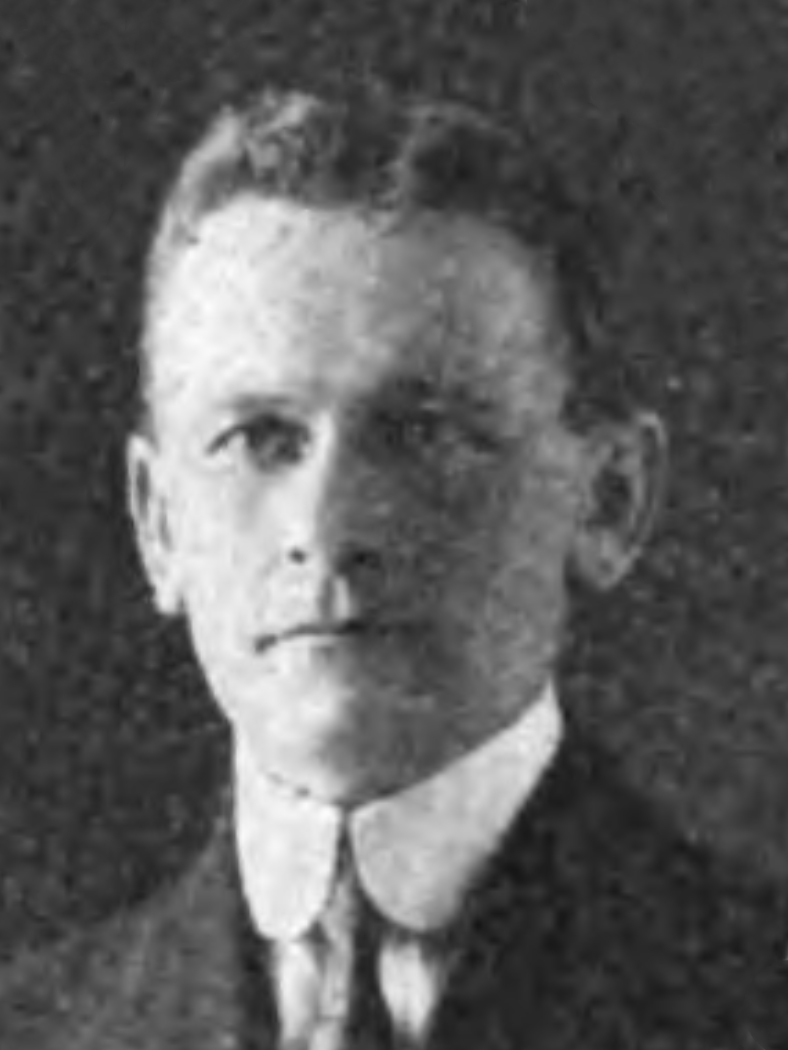
Young as a State Assemblymember in 1911.

Born in Lisbon, New Hampshire, Young moved to California at an early age, and graduated from the University of California, Berkeley in 1892. After his graduation, Young embarked on a career as a high school teacher, teaching in Santa Rosa from 1892 to 1893 and then at Lowell High School in San Francisco from 1893 to 1906, heading the school's English department. While at Lowell, Young actively participated in the National Education Association, attending and speaking at its conferences, including giving a speech entitled "The Use of a Library" at the association's conference in Los Angeles in 1899, arguing for greater cooperation between public schools and public libraries. Students at Lowell popularly nicknamed Young "C-Square," due to his initializing of his first and middle names, Clement Calhoun. In 1904, Young, along with Charles Mills Gayley, published The Principles and Progress of English Poetry. published and distributed by the Macmillan Company.

While teaching, he established his home in Berkeley, where he lived until his death, except for the years he served as governor.

Young was a close friend of realtor and conservationist Duncan McDuffie, and worked for Mason-McDuffie, a real estate general partnership based in Berkeley. Young would work or consult for Mason-McDuffie until 1944. He also helped McDuffie, who had served as president of the Save the Redwoods League and Sierra Club, establish the State Parks system upon his election as governor.

After his departure from Lowell in 1906, Young became involved in state politics. In 1908, he was elected to the California State Assembly for the district that included Berkeley. In the Assembly, Young became a political ally of governor Hiram Johnson and quickly rose through the chamber's ranks. In 1911 he worked with State Senator Albert E. Boynton on the Boynton-Young bill, which abolished "party line" ballots and introduced uniform secret ballots for all elections in the state of California. Young became Assembly Speaker in 1913. In the following year's legislative elections, Young was elected as a member of the Progressive Party. His flirtation with the party lasted for a single term before its dissolution in 1916 and he quickly returned to Republican ranks, though he remained sympathetic to the Progressive movement for much of the rest of his political career.

In the 1918 general elections, Young won the race for Lieutenant Governor of California, a position to which he was re-elected in 1922. In the 1920 U.S. presidential election, Young was a member of the Electoral College.

By 1926, frustration within inner Republican ranks with the fiscally conservative governorship of Friend Richardson had reached its zenith. In the gubernatorial primary election, Progressive Republicans overcame conservative and corporate opposition to win the nomination for Young, knocking Richardson out of the general election. In the 1926 general election campaign, Young earned vocal support from former governor Hiram Johnson and prominent banker Amadeo Giannini. Young won in a landslide, garnering 71.3 percent of the vote and crushing his rivals, who included Democrat Justus S. Wardell and Socialist author Upton Sinclair.

== Governor ==
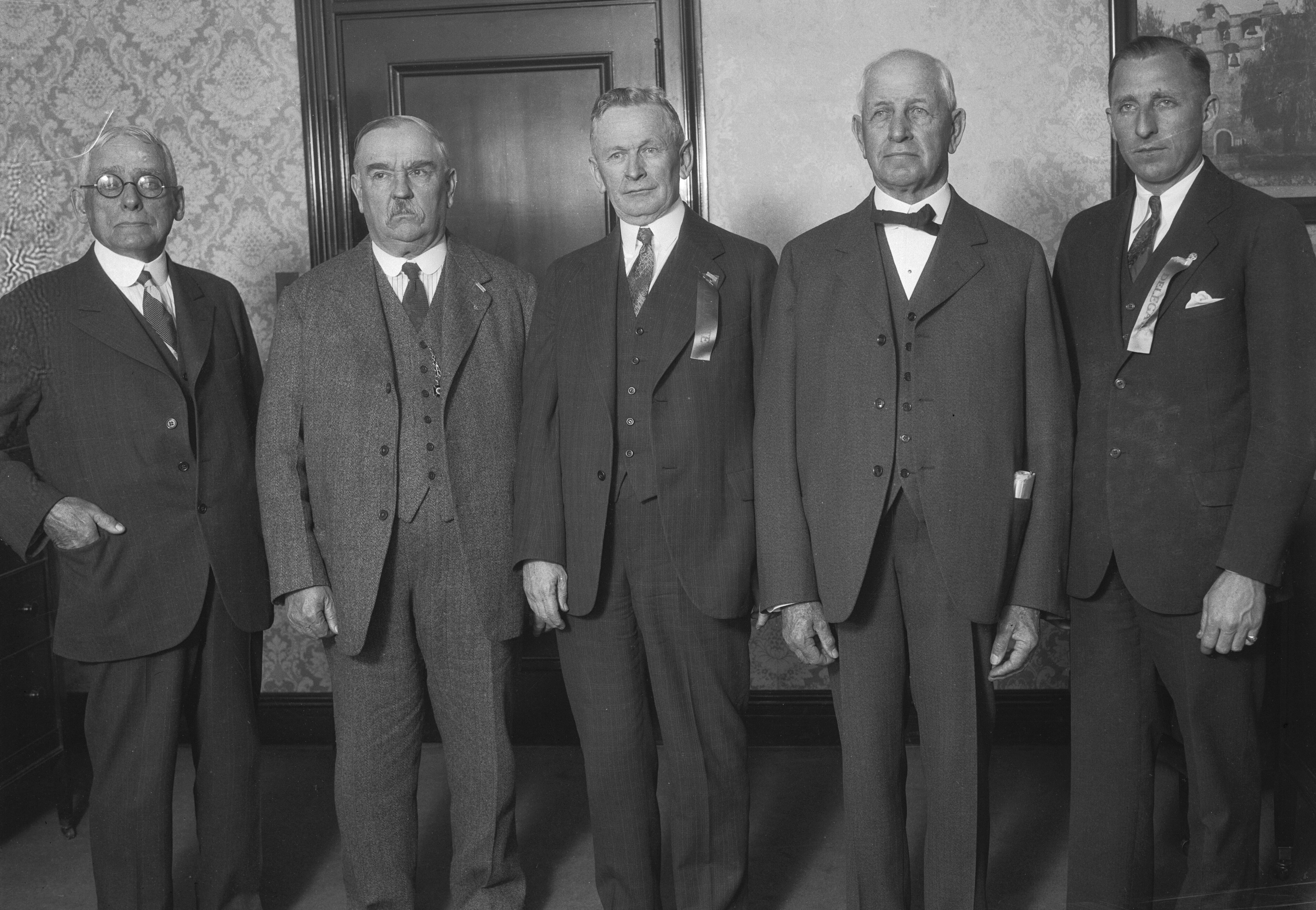
Current and former governors and lieutenant governors of California at a Herbert Hoover rally in Los Angeles, April 4, 1928. (L-R): Albert Joseph Wallace, Friend Richardson, C. C. Young, William Stephens, Buron Fitts

Beginning his governorship on January 4, 1927, Young's agenda included reorganizing the state's various commissions and departments into his cabinet to better coordinate state governmental affairs. "Some system like this would, I believe, be far more businesslike and effective than such haphazard and infrequent consultations as must otherwise normally take place between a Governor and our numerous unrelated boards and commissions," Young said.

Among his other priorities were: the financing of the state highway system through a fuel tax rather than by state bonds; more clearly defined roles for the State Board of Education and the California State Superintendent of Public Instruction to eliminate conflicting duties; upholding the direct primary; and the creation of penal facilities specifically for convicted females, believing that "San Quentin is no place for our women prisoners."

In his first year of office, Young signed a bill passed by the California State Legislature authorizing the creation of a California State Parks Commission. Headed by Frederick Law Olmsted Jr., the survey commission investigated lands across the state suitable for state protection and developed plans for their future financing. A year later in a voter initiative supported by Young, state voters approved the creation of the California State Park system.

In late June 1927, Young personally intervened for Charlotte Anita Whitney, a member of the Communist Party of the United States, who had been convicted under the 1919 Criminal Syndicalism Act passed under Governor William Stephens. In 1919, Whitney had been arrested in Oakland after defying civic authorities in making a speech in behalf of John McHugh, a member of the Industrial Workers of the World. The anti-syndicalism law used to prosecute her had recently been upheld by the U.S. Supreme Court which held that threats of violence against the state and individuals did not constitute free speech and was not protected by the First Amendment. Following the high court's decision, Young granted Whitney an unconditional pardon, believing that putting her into a cell was "unthinkable." Young added that the law under which she was convicted was undoubtedly constitutional, but that "abnormal conditions attending the trial" greatly influenced the jury and that "under ordinary circumstances" the case never would have been prosecuted.

On November 23, 1927, inmates at Folsom Prison rioted, taking control of a majority of the interior facilities, and took several prison guards as hostages. Young responded by mobilizing the California Army National Guard, ordering commanders to encircle the prison with their units, supported by heavy machine guns and two tanks shipped by train from Salinas. The heavy show of military force in full view of the rioters forced the revolting prisoners to capitulate peacefully.

In 1928, starring alongside British actor Ronald Colman, Young appeared in the film short Governor C.C. Young Hails Greater Talkie Season, appealing to early talking picture audiences to attend family-friendly movies and to ignore films that depicted negative images of society.

In 1929, Young signed the law creating the California Highway Patrol.

In October 1929, Young, along with President Herbert Hoover, established the Hoover-Young San Francisco Bay Bridge Commission to investigate the feasibility of a bridge linking the East Bay to San Francisco, supported by his Director of Public Works, Bert Meek, an engineer and surveyor. The commission submitted its report in August 1930, concluding that not only was the bridge necessary to the development of the area, but that it was "entirely feasible from economic and construction viewpoints." The San Francisco–Oakland Bay Bridge eventually was completed and opened to traffic in late 1936.

Following a strike by Mexican agricultural laborers in the Imperial Valley in 1928, Young commissioned an investigation on the status of working conditions for Mexicans. The investigation's findings, presented to Young in 1930, concluded that Mexican immigrants made up a majority of farm labor, had supplanted other immigrant groups and were now doing the work white European Americans would not do. The report also outlined that many labor contracting practices, including the withholding of 25 percent of immigrant farm labor salaries, were likely to be illegal.

Despite Young's Progressive credentials, Progressive attitudes towards the governor soured in 1929 after Young's appointee as state Superintendent of Banks, Will C. Wood, approved the merger between Amadeo Giannini's Bank of Italy with Orra E. Monnette's Bank of America. While Young denied that Giannini's support of his gubernatorial candidacy in 1926 was the reason for his support of the merger, his decision did not sit well with Progressives, who viewed economic conglomerations with suspicion. In 1930, constitutional restrictions on corporations were repealed.

The loss of support for Young among Progressives, along with the beginning of the Great Depression, severely hurt his chances of being re-nominated for a second term as governor. Despite campaign slogans that included "Re-Elect C.C. Young - He Left $31 Million in the Treasury," Young was defeated by James Rolph, the charismatic Mayor of San Francisco, in the Republican party's primary election in 1930.

Following Rolph's death shortly before the 1934 gubernatorial election, Young again sought the Republican nomination, but lost the primary election to Rolph's successor, Frank Merriam.

== Post-governorship ==
Young attended the 1932 Summer Olympics in Los Angeles, where he met and congratulated several of the athletes. Following his 1934 defeat, Young retired from politics. He served as the president of the Commonwealth Club of California between 1939 and 1940, and returned to writing, publishing The Legislature of California, a study of California legislative politics, in 1943. Until 1944, he devoted much of his working time to Mason-McDuffie, serving as its vice president.

He died on Christmas Eve (December 24), 1947 in Berkeley at the age of 78. His remains are interred at Sunset View Cemetery in El Cerrito.

== Family ==
Young was married to Lyla Jeannette Vincent and had two daughters.

Party political offices
Preceded by Friend Richardson	Republican nominee for Governor of California; 1926	Succeeded by James Rolph
Political offices
Preceded by William Stephens	Lieutenant Governor of California; 1919–1927	Succeeded by Buron Fitts
Preceded by William Stephens	Governor of California; 1927–1931	Succeeded by James Rolph
