= Bert Meek =

American engineer

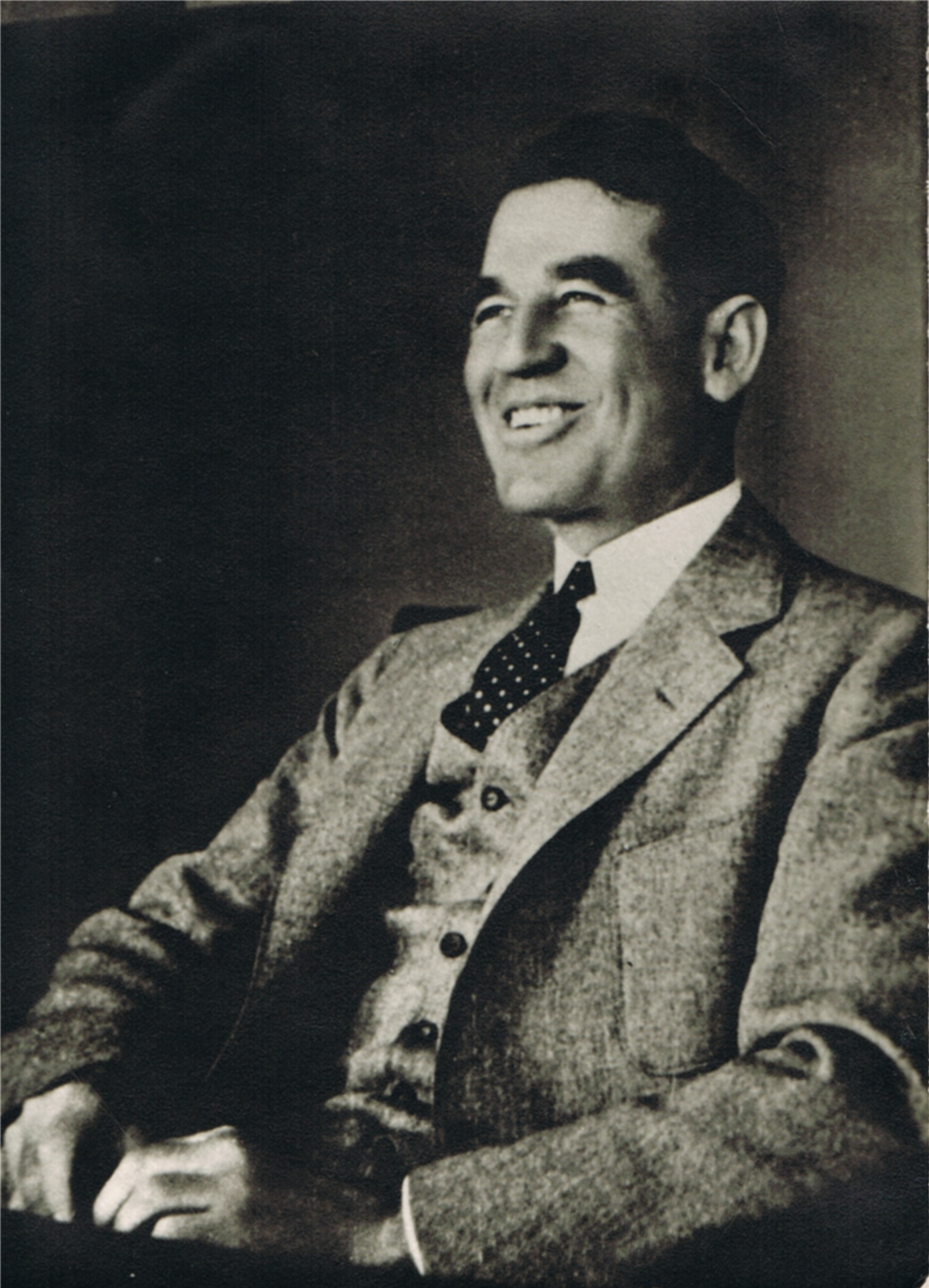
Bert B. Meek

Bert Bookham Meek (September 2, 1883 - September 28, 1937) was a California engineer, agricultural entrepreneur, and public official. He is credited with the careful planning and expansion of California's water management and transportation infrastructure while serving as the state's Director of Public Works from 1927 to 1931.

== Early career ==
After completing high school in Redlands, CA, Meek studied civil engineering at University of California, Berkeley, interrupting his studies several times with survey work to pay for his education. He joined a team with the Western Pacific Survey. He then worked with the Edison Electric Company in Los Angeles, the North California Mining Company in Butte and Plumas Counties, and the Gigante Mining Co. in El Salvador. From 1908 to 1910, he was the assistant engineer for the Feather River Canal Company.

== Agricultural enterprises ==
After researching the potential for olive cultivation and commercialization, Meek built up a holding at the foot of Table Mountain in Northern California, where he planted 1000 acres of olives. With business partners Judge John Carleton Gray and Orville C. Perry, he organized the Olive Products Company, with Meek serving as president and general manager. The plant crushed olives for oil and also canned pickled olives which were sold under the brand name Mt. Ida. A third generation farmer, he was active in studying and promoting methods to improve productivity. His contributions to the farming sector included serving as Vice President of the Butte County Farm Bureau. He was also an enthusiastic proponent of 4H clubs, and presided over the State Junior Livestock Show in 1934.

== Public service and legacy ==
In 1914, Meek was elected a member of the State Assembly for Butte County. He initiated legislation for the abatement of mosquitos causing malaria, and for the convict labor bill, which provided for paid employment of convicts to build public roads. He was a commissioner on the state board of prison directors from 1916 to 1927.

Meek was appointed as state Director of Public Works in 1927 under Governor C. C. Young. In this post, he implemented reforms including: competitive bidding on highways and bridges; a system of preparing detailed itemized budgets for roadways; introduction of long-term planning and engineering studies for the orderly development of California's state highway system; and, requirements for roadside beautification including recreation areas and restrictions on billboard permitting. He was involved with obtaining federal approval and funding for the California Water Conservation Act in 1929, and oversaw the completion of an in-depth State Water Plan in 1930. The completion of the Feather River Gateway Bridge was a milestone under his administration. Meek was a strong advocate for dedicating full resources to construction of the Oakland Bay Bridge, which opened in November, 1936.

== Business career ==
In 1931, Meek served as president of the California Lands Inc, the subsidiary of the Bank of America set up to liquidate farm holdings of borrowers who were unable to pay their mortgages. Then in 1932 until his death, Meek was executive vice president of the Hearst Corporation.

== Personal life ==
Meek was the son of Richard B. Meek, a native of Missouri, and Anna Susan Wilshire of Salt Lake City. In 1921, he married Laura Hanlon in Berkeley, CA; they had five children, and resided in Oroville, Sacramento, Stanford, and then in Atherton, CA.
