= Florrie O'Donoghue =

Irish revolutionary and historian (1894–1967)

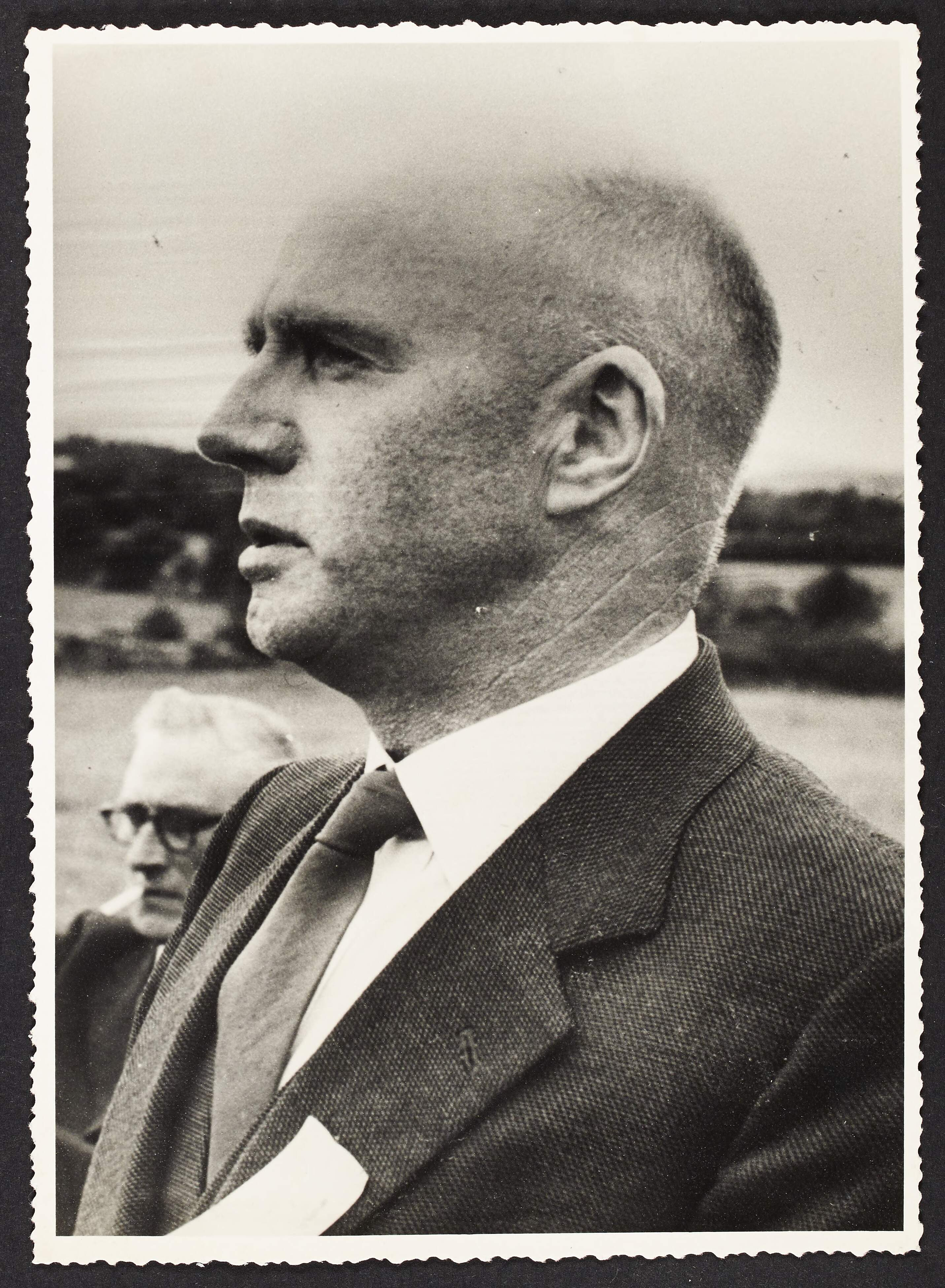
- O'Donoghue in 1957
- Born: Florence O'Donoghue; 22 July 1894; Rathmore, County Kerry
- Died: 18 December 1967 (aged 73); Cork
- Spouse(s): Mary Josephine Brown, 27 April 1921
- Children: 6
- Military career
- Branch: Irish Volunteers; Irish Republican Army (1919–1922); Anti-Treaty IRA; Defence Forces
- Rank: Commandant general (IRA), major (Defence Forces)
- Conflicts: Irish War of Independence

Florence O'Donoghue (22 July 1894–18 December 1967), usually known as "Florrie", was an Irish revolutionary who served as head of intelligence of the Cork No. 1 Brigade of the Irish Republican Army during the Irish War of Independence. While opposed to the Anglo-Irish Treaty, he did not take sides in the Irish Civil War but was prominent in the "Neutral IRA" that urged reconciliation on either side of the treaty debate. Later he became a historian of the Irish revolutionary period.

== Early life ==
O'Donoghue was born in Rathmore, County Kerry, on 22 July 1894, the only son of six children of Timothy O'Donoghue, a farmer of Gortdromakerry, and Julia O'Donoghue (née Murphy). He moved to Cork in 1910, where he worked as an apprentice in the drapery trade.

== Military life ==
The 1916 Easter Rising was a watershed in O'Donoghue's life. In December 1916, he joined the Cork branch of the Irish Volunteers. In early 1917, he was elected unanimously 1st lieutenant of the cyclist company and, as result, devoted all his spare time to Volunteer work. He began writing weekly for two years for the Irish World newspaper. By May 1917, he was sworn into the Irish Republican Brotherhood and, in October, Tomás Mac Curtain appointed O'Donoghue as communication officer of the Cork Brigade. He replaced Pat Higgins as brigade adjutant in February 1917. O'Donoghue was a key organiser in the jail-break of Captain Donnchadh Mac Niallghuis on Armistice Day 1918 and took personal responsibility for his protection.

O'Donoghue built up an intelligence network and agents which included his future wife, Josephine Marchment. She was head female clerk at the 6th Division headquarters at Victoria Barracks, Cork, and passed on secret British Army correspondence to him. O'Donoghue recruited people to open letters, tap phone lines and intercept telegrams. The IRA had 2,000 active members in Cork which were also used for intelligence gathering. By March 1920, after killing an RIC inspector, O'Donoghue was on the run and serving full-time in the IRA.

=== Irish Civil War ===
After two and a half years of fighting, a truce was agreed on 11 July 1921. When the Dáil approved the Anglo-Irish Treaty in January 1922, the IRA split into pro- and anti-treaty camps. Although O'Donoghue joined the Anti-Treaty IRA and was elected onto their army’s executive as adjutant-general, he warned of the dangers of civil war. In June 1922, he resigned from the Anti-Treaty national executive and a month later, on 3 July 1922, from their army. Civil war did break out on 28 June 1922 between pro and anti-treaty factions, much to O'Donoghue's dismay.

During the civil war, O'Donoghue remained neutral and tried to organise a truce to end the fighting. In December 1922, he formed a group called the Neutral IRA, along with Sean O'Hegarty, composed of pro-truce IRA men. O'Donoghue claimed he had 20,000 members in this group. He campaigned for a month's truce between the two sides, so that a political compromise could be reached. However, his efforts came to nothing and in March 1923, he wound up the "Neutral IRA", judging that its objectives could not be achieved. The civil war ended on 24 May 1923.

=== World War II ===
Following the outbreak of World War II, O'Donoghue enlisted in the Defence Forces as a private in June 1940 and quickly rose through the ranks, achieving the position of major. Serving as the intelligence officer for the 1st Division, Southern Command, from April 1943 to October 1945, he was tasked with the establishment and operation of the Supplementary Intelligence Service (SIS). Initially created to counter a potential invasion of Ireland's south coast, the SIS shifted its focus to intelligence-gathering once the invasion threat had subsided. Notably, he played a key role in preventing the escape of German agent Hermann Görtz and in the recapture of former Special Branch member Jim Crofton. O'Donoghue's ability to navigate political divisions, owing to his standing with individuals on both sides of the treaty split, enabled him to recruit several IRA veterans into the SIS. Additionally, from March 1943 to October 1945, he served as the editor of the army journal An Cosantóir and the 1st Division's An Barr Buadh.

== Later years ==
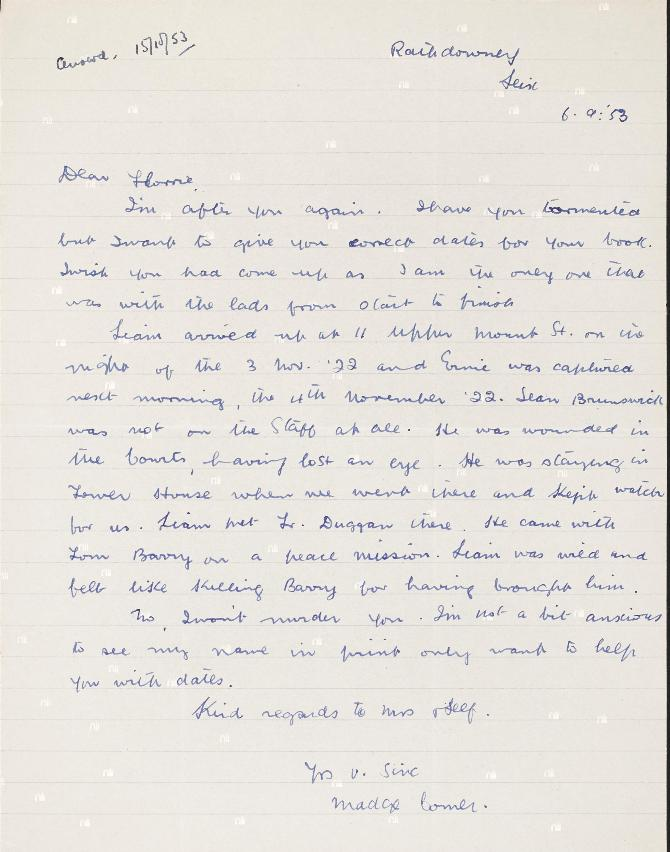
A handwritten letter of September 1953 from Madge Clifford to O'Donoghue regarding November 1922

In later years he became a historian and, while in the army, was editor of An Cosantóir, the Irish Army's magazine. He convinced Éamon de Valera to establish the Bureau of Military History which would record personal accounts from the Irish War of Independence. From December 1946 to May 1948, O'Donoghue served as a member of the advisory committee for the Bureau of Military History. A member of both the Irish Historical Society and the Military History Society, during the 1950s and 1960s he wrote extensively on the history of the Irish Revolution. His major publications include No Other Law (1954), which was a biography of Liam Lynch. He also wrote biographies of Diarmuid Lynch (1957) and Tomás MacCurtain (1958). He also wrote The IRB and the 1916 Insurrection (1957) and contributed to Karl Spindler's The Mystery of the Casement Ship (1965), as well as contributed numerous articles to the Capuchin Annual, An Cosantóir, University Review, and the Cork Historical and Archaeological Society Journal. Additionally, he was involved in the Cork Tostal council, the finance committee of the Cork Film Festival, and the Cork International Choral Festival.

== Personal life ==
He married Josephine Brown, née Marchment, in April 1921 and had four children. The couple also adopted Josephine's two children from her first marriage. He became a rates collector and remained outside politics.

O'Donoghue died on 18 December 1967 and Tom Barry gave the graveside oration.
