= 1918 Connecticut lieutenant gubernatorial election =

- November 5, 1918
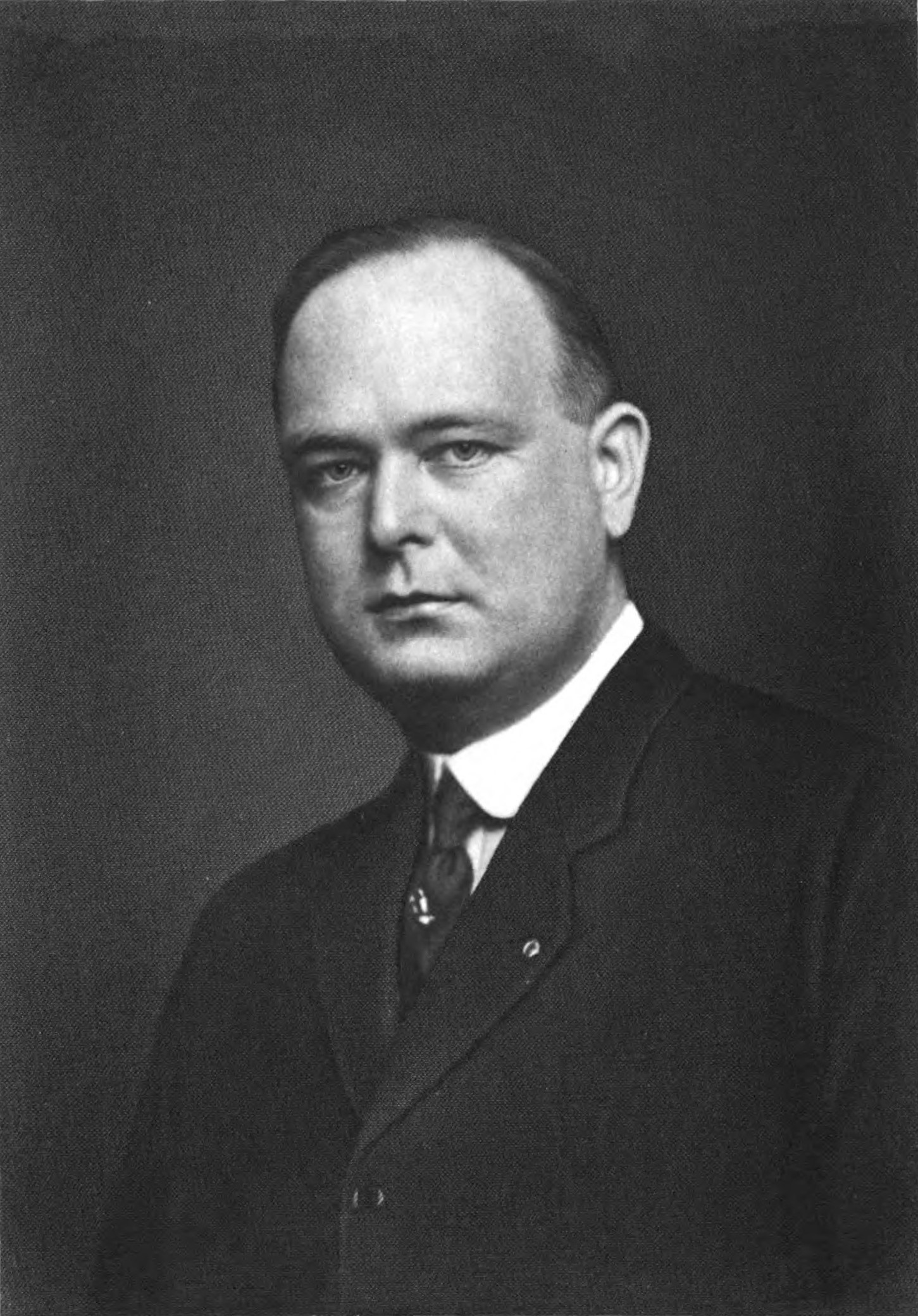

Nominee	Clifford B. Wilson	Charles D. Lockwood
Party	Republican	Democratic
Popular vote	84,467	76,447
Percentage	52.50%	47.50%
Lieutenant Governor before election
Clifford B. Wilson
Republican
Elected Lieutenant Governor
Clifford B. Wilson
Republican

The 1918 Connecticut lieutenant gubernatorial election was held on November 5, 1918, to elect the lieutenant governor of Connecticut. Incumbent Republican lieutenant governor Clifford B. Wilson won re-election against Democratic nominee and former member of the Connecticut House of Representatives Charles D. Lockwood.

== General election ==
On election day, November 5, 1918, incumbent Republican lieutenant governor Clifford B. Wilson won re-election with 52.50% of the vote, thereby retaining Republican control over the office of lieutenant governor. Wilson was sworn in for his third term on January 1, 1919.

=== Results ===
Connecticut lieutenant gubernatorial election, 1918
Party	Candidate	Votes	%
Republican	Clifford B. Wilson (incumbent)	84,467	52.50
Democratic	Charles D. Lockwood	76,447	47.50
Total votes		160,913	100.00
Republican hold			
