= 1918 Texas lieutenant gubernatorial election =

- November 5, 1918
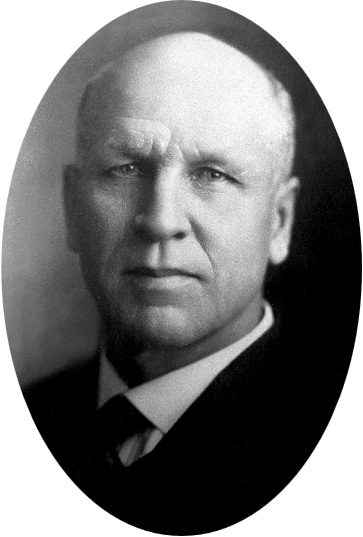

Nominee	Willard Arnold Johnson	John C. Scott
Party	Democratic	Republican
Popular vote	152,835	22,909
Percentage	86.16%	12.91%
Lieutenant Governor before election
Vacant
Elected Lieutenant Governor
Willard Arnold Johnson
Democratic

The 1918 Texas lieutenant gubernatorial election was held on November 5, 1918, in order to elect the lieutenant governor of Texas. Democratic nominee and incumbent member of the Texas Senate Willard Arnold Johnson defeated Republican nominee John C. Scott and Socialist nominee T. L. Hurlburt.

== General election ==
On election day, November 5, 1918, Democratic nominee Willard Arnold Johnson won the election by a margin of 129,926 votes against his foremost opponent Republican nominee John C. Scott, thereby retaining Democratic control over the office of lieutenant governor. Johnson was sworn in as the 25th lieutenant governor of Texas on January 21, 1919.

=== Results ===
Texas lieutenant gubernatorial election, 1918
Party	Candidate	Votes	%
Democratic	Willard Arnold Johnson	152,835	86.16
Republican	John C. Scott	22,909	12.91
Socialist	T. L. Hurlburt	1,640	0.93
Total votes		177,384	100.00
Democratic hold			
