= 1918 Panamanian parliamentary election =

Parliamentary elections were held in Panama on 7 July 1918, electing both a new National Assembly.

After an election held under American supervision, preliminary returns gave the opposition 20 seats in the Assembly to the government's 13. The way thus seemed clear for an opposition candidate to be selected as president, most likely Ricardo Arias Feraud.

The government contested a number of decisions and requested that the American electoral commission decide the disputes. The final judgment was that the government had won a majority of the National Assembly.

== Results ==
Party	Seats
Supporters of Belisario Porras Barahona	20
Supporters of Rodolfo Chiari	13
Total	33
