= 1918 Nicaraguan parliamentary election =

Parliamentary elections were held in Nicaragua in November 1918 for half of the Deputies and a third of the Senators of the National Congress.
