= 1918 Argentine legislative election =

- 3 March 1918
- 64 of the 120 seats in the Chamber of Deputies
- Turnout: 58.48%
| Party | Vote % | Seats | +/– |
|---|---|---|---|
| Radical Civic Union | 46.92 | 36 | +10 |
| Conservative Parties | 22.50 | 18 | −3 |
| Socialist Party | 8.74 | 3 | 0 |
| Dissident Radical Civic Union | 8.43 | 4 | 0 |
| Democratic Progressive Party | 7.76 | 1 | −6 |
This lists parties that won seats. See the complete results below.
Results by province

Legislative elections were held in Argentina on 3 March 1918. Voters chose their legislators and numerous governors, and with a turnout of 58%.

== Background ==
President Hipólito Yrigoyen, elected in 1916 in the nation's first, free elections, responded (like numerous other administrations before his) to opposition with less than democratic means: the placing of provincial governments under federal intervention. His first target, Marcelino Ugarte, was the Conservative Governor of Buenos Aires Province (home to over one in three Argentines, and to most of the source of the nation's growing wealth, the Pampas); Ugarte's removal on April 24, 1917, would be followed by six others by the time the first Yrigoyen-era mid-term elections arrived a year later.

The President's lack of support in Congress for these moves (which, on the Ugarte issue, lost a floor vote by 36 to 53), extended to other areas, including foreign policy. Congress rejected Yrigoyen's policy of neutrality, and approved a series of measures in support of the Allied Powers; indeed, the only significant presidential bill supported by Congress during the 1916–18 term was a modest, 5 percent export tariff enacted to finance needed rural public works. Rifts developed within the UCR, itself - notably in the important Santa Fe Province, where Governor Rodolfo Lehmann formed the Dissident UCR in protest over the President's policy over removing governors.

Focused on the crucial Buenos Aires Province gubernatorial race, the UCR nominated one of their most prominent supporters from among the landed gentry, José Camilo Crotto. Crotto, a UCR activist from its earliest days in the 1890s, was a reformist who shared Yrigoyen's support for public works, farm credit, and de-monopolization of the province's vast rail network. The economy, burdened by a shortage of capital and imported goods as a result of World War I, had begun to recover strongly by late 1917. This improvement took place despite an extensive strike in the critical rail transport sector, and turned the electoral tide in Yrigoyen's favor ahead of the March 1918 polls.

Ultimately, the UCR repeated its performance in the 1916 legislative races, winning nearly half the vote, and gaining 12 seats. The results left them 5 short of an absolute majority; but made temporary alliances feasible, and thus guaranteed the President's legislative agenda. Buenos Aires Province, the bulwark of conservative opposition, would have its first elected UCR governor with Crotto's defeat of Conservative candidate Alfredo Echagüe by 114,000 to 68,000, as well as an ample majority in the provincial legislature. The UCR won in nearly every province in which elections were held in 1918, as well as in the City of Buenos Aires, where the formerly dominant Socialists (saddled by a break in party ranks) secured but 3 of the 9 seats at stake. Yrigoyen's most glaring defeat, in turn, came from Santa Fe, where Governor Lehmann's Dissident UCR won 4 of the 6 seats at stake.

Elections to the Senate, held in April, 1919, significantly enhanced the UCR's presence in the body, where opposition to Yrigoyen's populist agenda had been strongest. The party won 7 of the 10 seats at stake, including the crucial City of Buenos Aires seat (the only one not elected by provincial legislatures, until 2001), where Congressman Vicente Gallo, a veteran of the UCR's struggle for universal (male) suffrage from the 1890s, defeated the Socialists; Gallo, a founding member of the right-wing Argentine Patriotic League, benefited from a Red Scare that developed in the city during January's "Tragic Week" riots. Five of these new Senators, however, including three from the UCR itself, and both San Luis Province Senators, were barred from taking their seats by President Yrigoyen's intervention decrees. They joined the numerous Governors so removed, and portended a deep schism in the party.

== Results ==
| Party or alliance | | Votes | % | Seats | |
| Party or alliance | | Votes | % | Won | Total |
|---|---|---|---|---|---|
| Radical Civic Union | | 349,622 | 46.92 | 36 | 59 |
| Conservative Parties | Conservative Party | 68,195 | 9.15 | 5 | – |
| Conservative Parties | Popular Concentration | 35,879 | 4.82 | 7 | – |
| Conservative Parties | Liberal Party of Corrientes | 14,769 | 1.98 | 3 | – |
| Conservative Parties | Liberal Party of Tucumán | 14,054 | 1.89 | 1 | – |
| Conservative Parties | Democratic Union | 9,220 | 1.24 | 0 | – |
| Conservative Parties | Autonomist Party of Corrientes | 8,821 | 1.18 | 0 | – |
| Conservative Parties | Provincial Union | 8,646 | 1.16 | 2 | – |
| Conservative Parties | Catamarca Concentration | 8,089 | 1.09 | 0 | – |
| Conservative Parties | Total | 167,673 | 22.50 | 18 | 37 |
| Socialist Party | | 65,099 | 8.74 | 3 | 6 |
| Dissident Radical Civic Union | | 62,791 | 8.43 | 4 | 8 |
| Democratic Progressive Party | | 57,826 | 7.76 | 1 | 8 |
| Argentine Socialist Party | | 35,309 | 4.74 | 0 | 0 |
| International Socialist Party | | 2,753 | 0.37 | 0 | 0 |
| Unitarian Party | | 1,242 | 0.17 | 0 | 0 |
| For the National Intervention | | 690 | 0.09 | 0 | 0 |
| Independent Youth | | 416 | 0.06 | 0 | 0 |
| Others | | 1,652 | 0.22 | 0 | 0 |
| Vacant | | | | 2 | 2 |
| Total | | 745,073 | 100.00 | 64 | 120 |
| Valid votes | | 745,073 | 97.74 | | |
| Invalid/blank votes | | 17,226 | 2.26 | | |
| Total votes | | 762,299 | 100.00 | | |
| Registered voters/turnout | | 1,303,446 | 58.48 | | |
Source: Cantón, Chamber of Deputies
