= Justus S. Wardell =

American politician

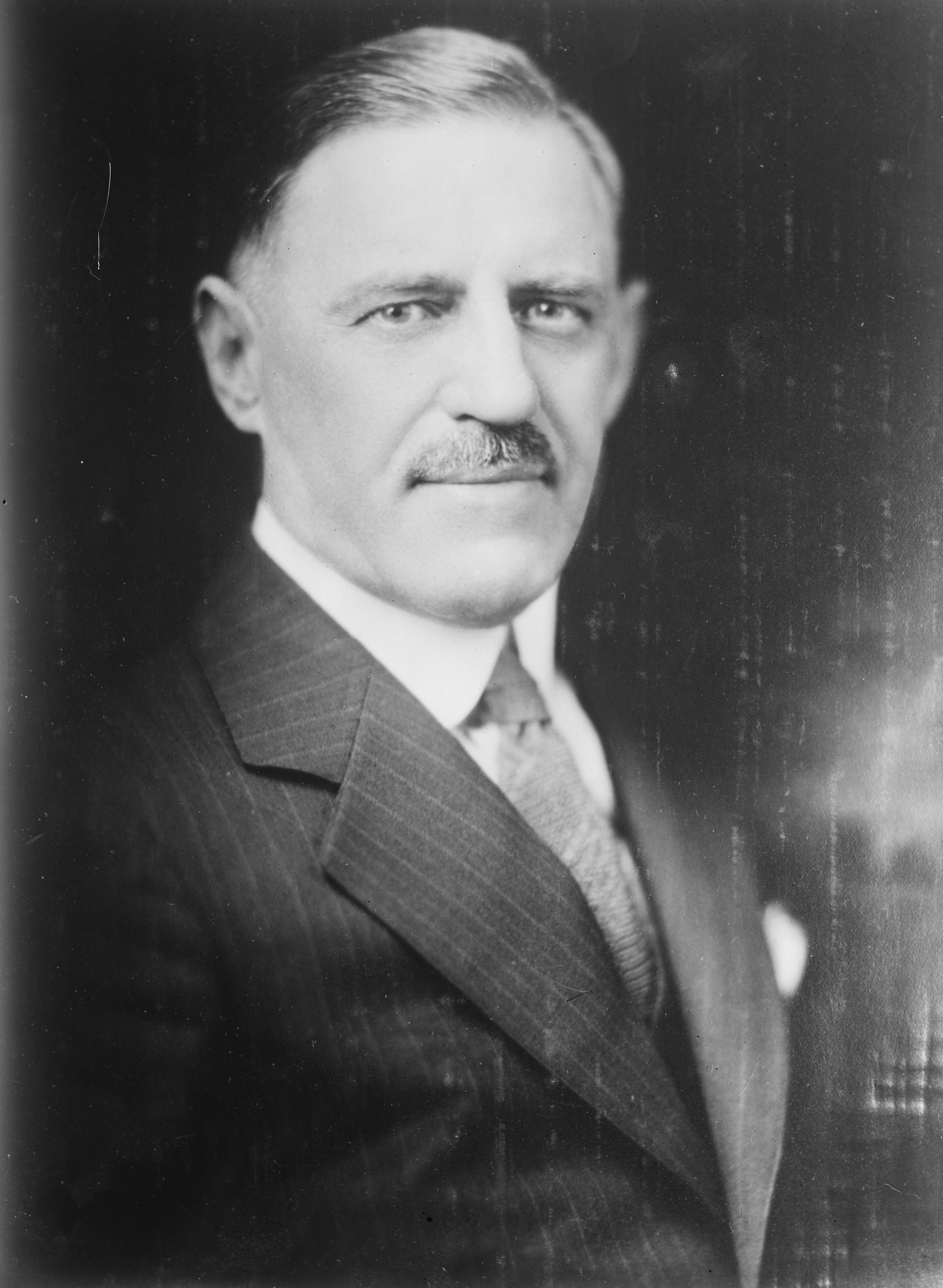
- Wardell in 1916

Chairman of the California Democratic Party
- In office July 1931 – September 1932
- Preceded by: Zachary T. Malaby
- Succeeded by: Maurice Harrison

Member of the California State Assembly from the 39th district
- In office January 2, 1899 – January 1, 1901
- Preceded by: Leon E. Jones
- Succeeded by: Frank D. MacBeth

Personal details
- Born: Justus Struver Wardell; June 30, 1872 San Francisco, California, U.S.
- Died: September 24, 1945 (aged 73) San Francisco, California, U.S.
- Resting place: Woodlawn Memorial Park
- Party: Democratic
- Spouse: Clara Louise Kellogg (m. 1895)
- Children: Benjamin; Virginia
- Occupation: Journalist, businessman, politician

Justus Struver Wardell (June 30, 1872 – September 24, 1945) was an American journalist, businessman and politician who served one term in the California State Assembly from 1899 to 1901. He also served as Surveyor of Customs for the Port of San Francisco from 1913 to 1917, Collector of Internal Revenue in San Francisco from 1917 to 1920, and Chairman of the California Democratic Party from 1931 to 1932.

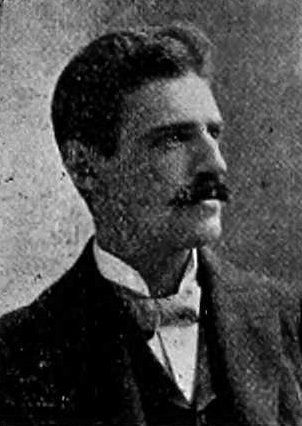
Wardell c. 1896

Wardell made several failed bids for higher office. He ran for Sheriff of San Francisco in 1901, losing to incumbent John Lackmann. He was the Democratic candidate for Governor of California in 1926, losing to Republican C. C. Young. In 1932 he ran for U.S. Senate and in 1934 he again ran for Governor, losing both primaries.

He died at St. Luke's Hospital in San Francisco on September 24, 1945, and was buried at Woodlawn Memorial Park in Colma.
