= 1918 California lieutenant gubernatorial election =

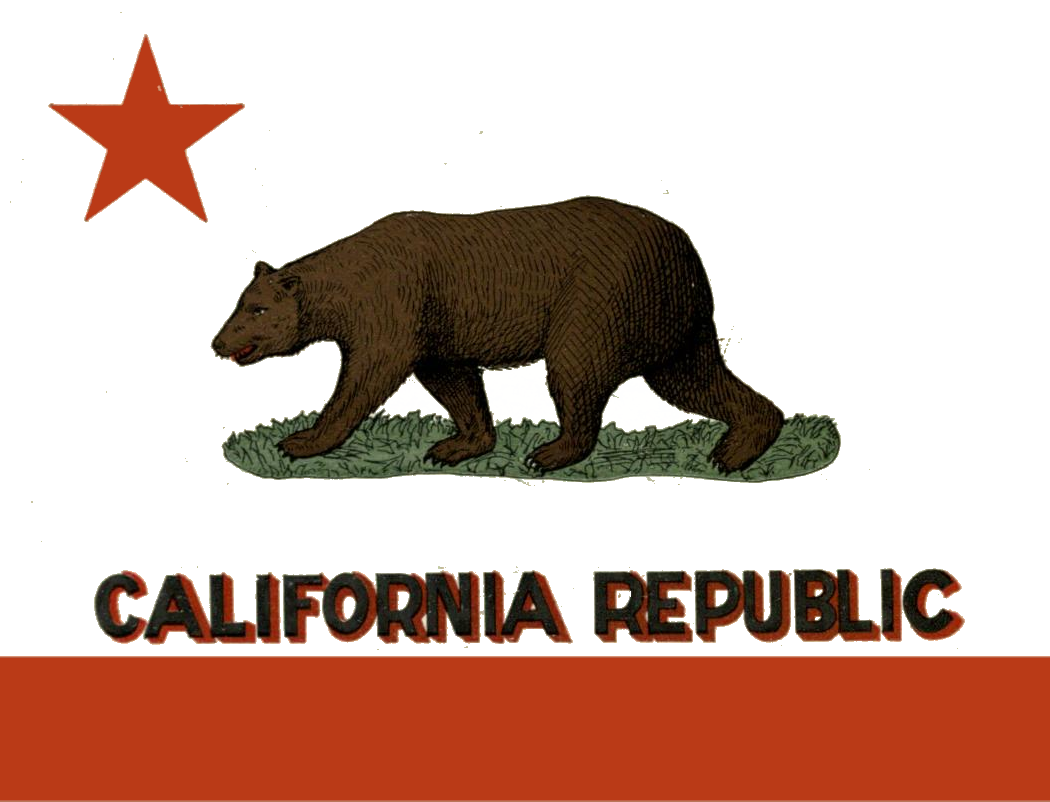
- November 5, 1918
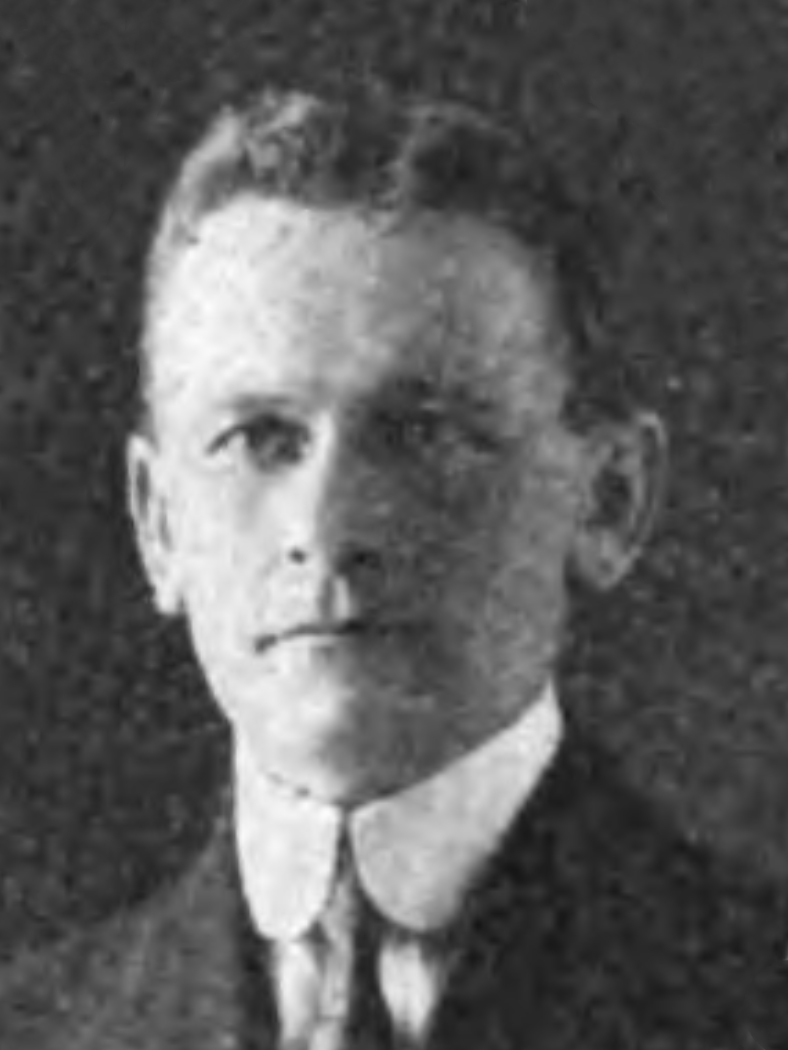

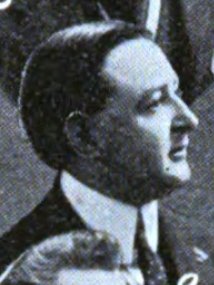

Nominee	C. C. Young	Jo V. Snyder	Elvina S. Beals
Party	Republican	Democratic	Socialist
Popular vote	355,247	259,415	42,161
Percentage	54.09%	39.50%	6.42%
- County results Young: 40–50% 50–60% 60–70% 70–80% Snyder: 40–50% 50–60% 60–70%
Lieutenant Governor before election
Arthur H. Breed Sr.
Republican
Elected Lieutenant Governor
C. C. Young
Republican

The 1918 California lieutenant gubernatorial election was held on November 5, 1918. Republican State Assemblyman C. C. Young defeated Democratic State Assemblyman Jo V. Snyder with 67.28% of the vote.

== General election ==
=== Candidates ===
- C. C. Young, Republican
- Jo V. Snyder, Democratic
- Elvina S. Beals, Socialist

=== Results ===
1918 California lieutenant gubernatorial election
Party	Candidate	Votes	%	±%
Republican	C. C. Young	355,247	54.09%	
Democratic	Jo V. Snyder	259,415	39.50%	
Socialist	Elvina S. Beals	42,161	6.42%	
Majority		887,803		
Turnout				
Republican hold		Swing		
