= 1918 Bolivian legislative election =

Parliamentary elections were held in Bolivia in May 1918 to elect half the seats of the Chamber Deputies and one-third of the Senate.

== Results ==
Party	Votes	%	Seats					
Party	Votes	%	Chamber			Senate		
Party	Votes	%	Elected	Total	+/–	Elected	Total	+/–
Liberal Party			16	51	–18	6	16	0
Republican Party			19	19	New	0	0	New
Total			35	70	0	6	16	0
Source: Cáceres

=== Elected members ===
The new senators were:

- Juan María Zalles, PL (La Paz)
- Felipe Peredo, PL (Santa Cruz)
- Adolfo Trigo Achá, PL (Tarija)
- Ismael Arteaga, PL (Beni)
- Néstor Suárez, PL (Beni)
- Clodoveo Urioste, PL (Chuquisaca)
